= Kerala backwaters =

Lagoon network in Kerala, India

Coordinates: 9.86348°N 76.3594°E

Designations

Ramsar Wetland
- Official name: Ashtamudi Wetland
- Designated: 19 August 2002
- Reference no.: 1204

Ramsar Wetland
- Official name: Vembanad-Kol Wetland
- Designated: 19 August 2002
- Reference no.: 1214

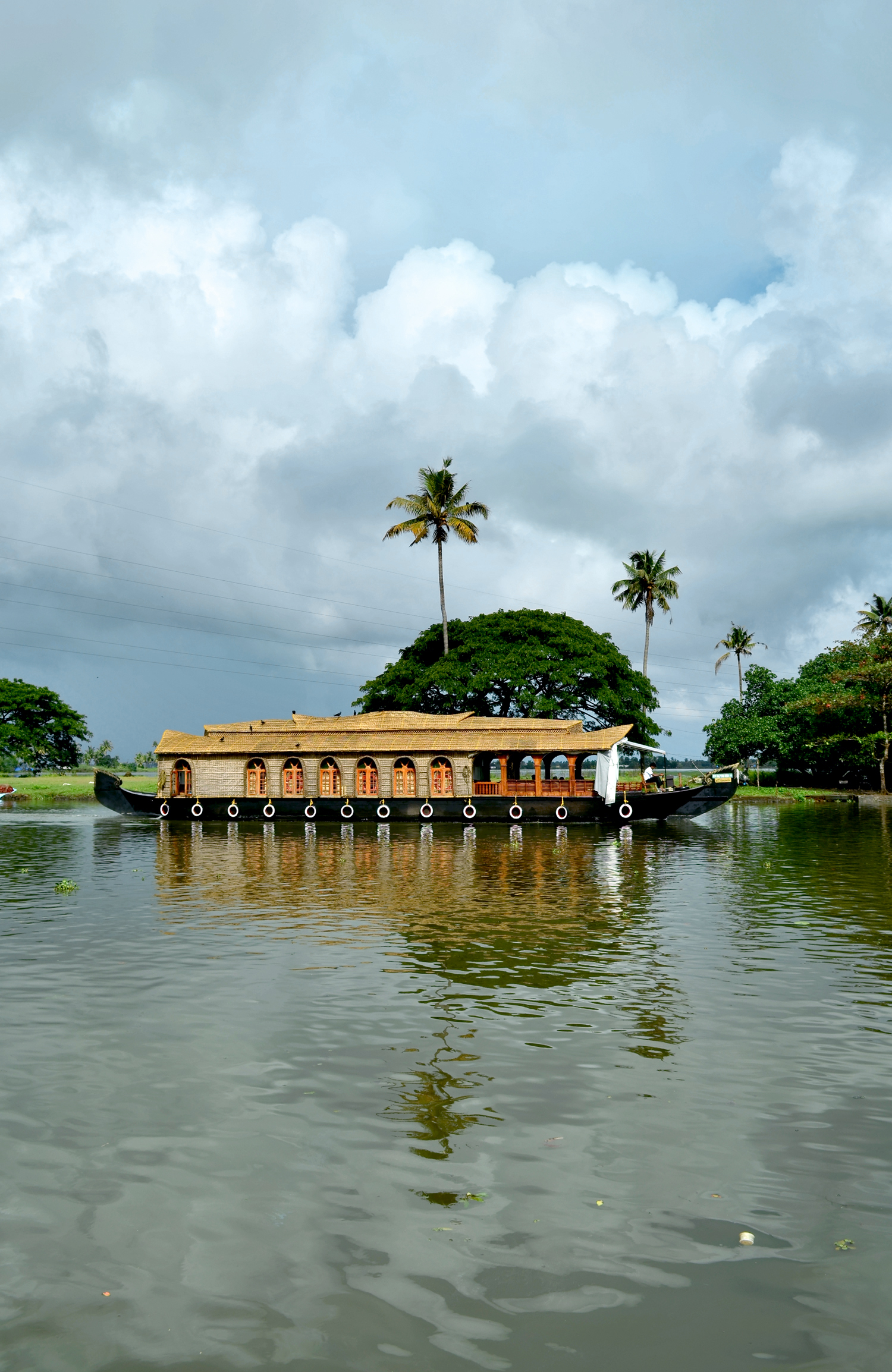
A houseboat view from Vembanad Lake

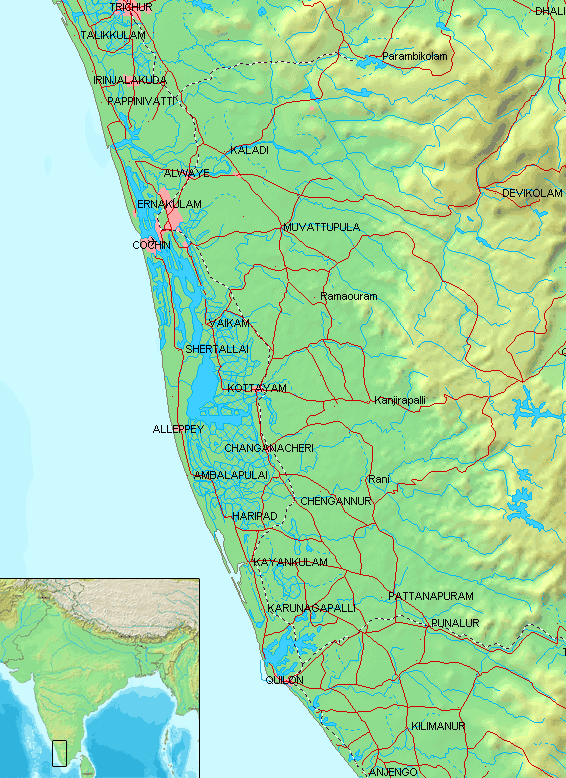
Map of the backwaters in Kerala

The Kerala backwaters are a network of brackish lagoons and canals running parallel to the Arabian Sea along the Malabar Coast of Kerala, India. It also includes interconnected lakes, rivers, and inlets, a labyrinthine system formed by more than 900 km (560 mi) of waterways, and is sometimes compared to bayous. The network includes five large lakes linked by canals, both artificial and natural, fed by 38 rivers, and extending virtually half the length of the Kerala state. The backwaters were formed by the action of waves and shore currents, creating low barrier islands across the mouths of the many rivers flowing down from the Western Ghats range. In the midst of this landscape, there are a number of towns and cities, which serve as the start and end points of backwater cruises. There are 34 backwaters in Kerala. Of these, 27 are located either closer to the Arabian Sea or parallel to the sea. The remaining 7 are inland navigation routes.

The backwaters have a unique ecosystem: Freshwater from the rivers meets the seawater from the Arabian Sea. A barrage has been built near Thanneermukkom, so saltwater from the sea is prevented from entering deep inside, keeping the freshwater intact. Such freshwater is extensively used for irrigation purposes. Many unique species of aquatic life including crabs, frogs and mudskippers, water birds such as terns, kingfishers, darters and cormorants, and animals such as otters and turtles live in and along the backwaters. Palm trees, pandanus shrubs, various leafy plants, and bushes grow alongside the backwaters, providing a green hue to the surrounding landscape.

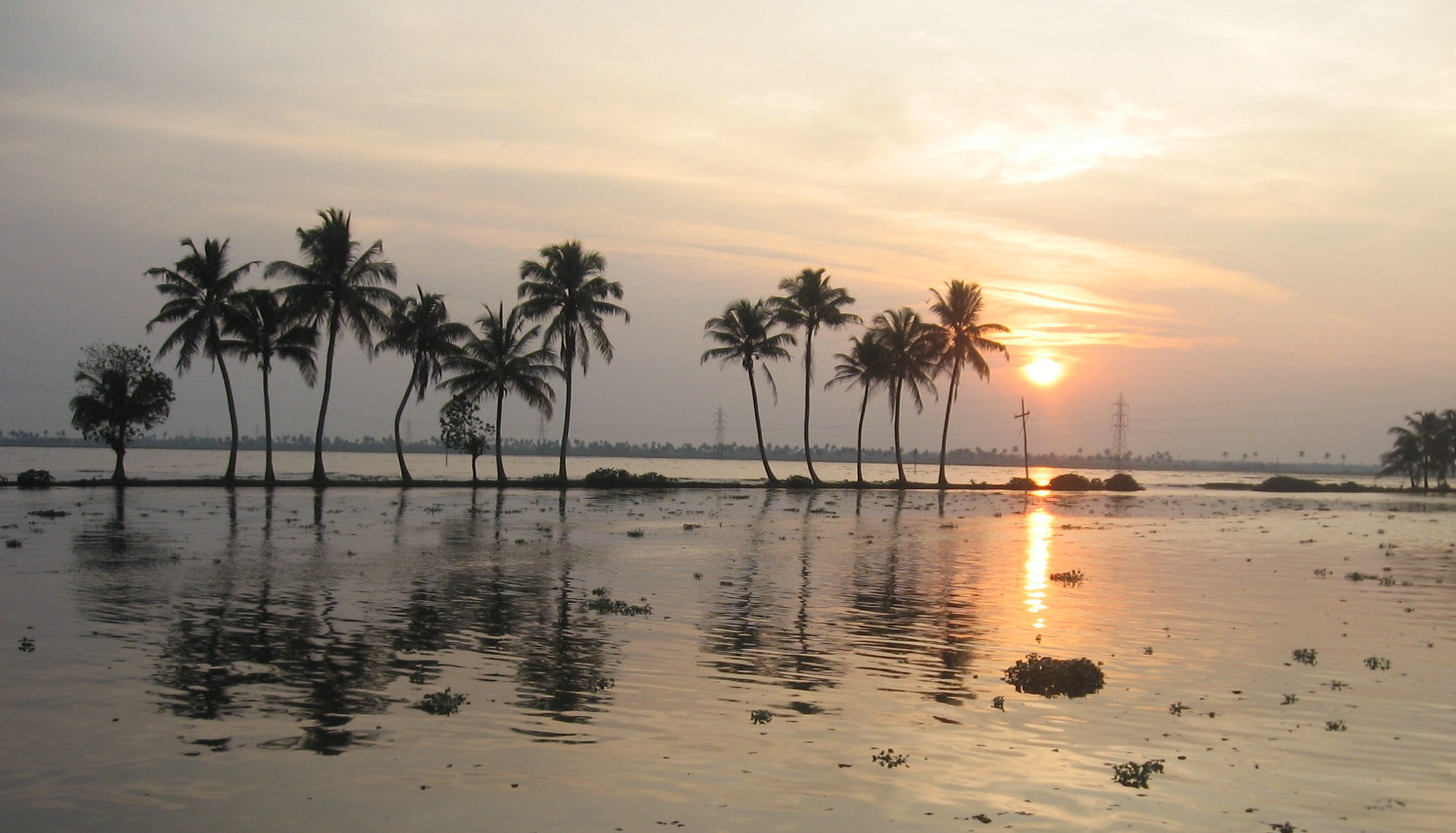
Sunset in the backwaters

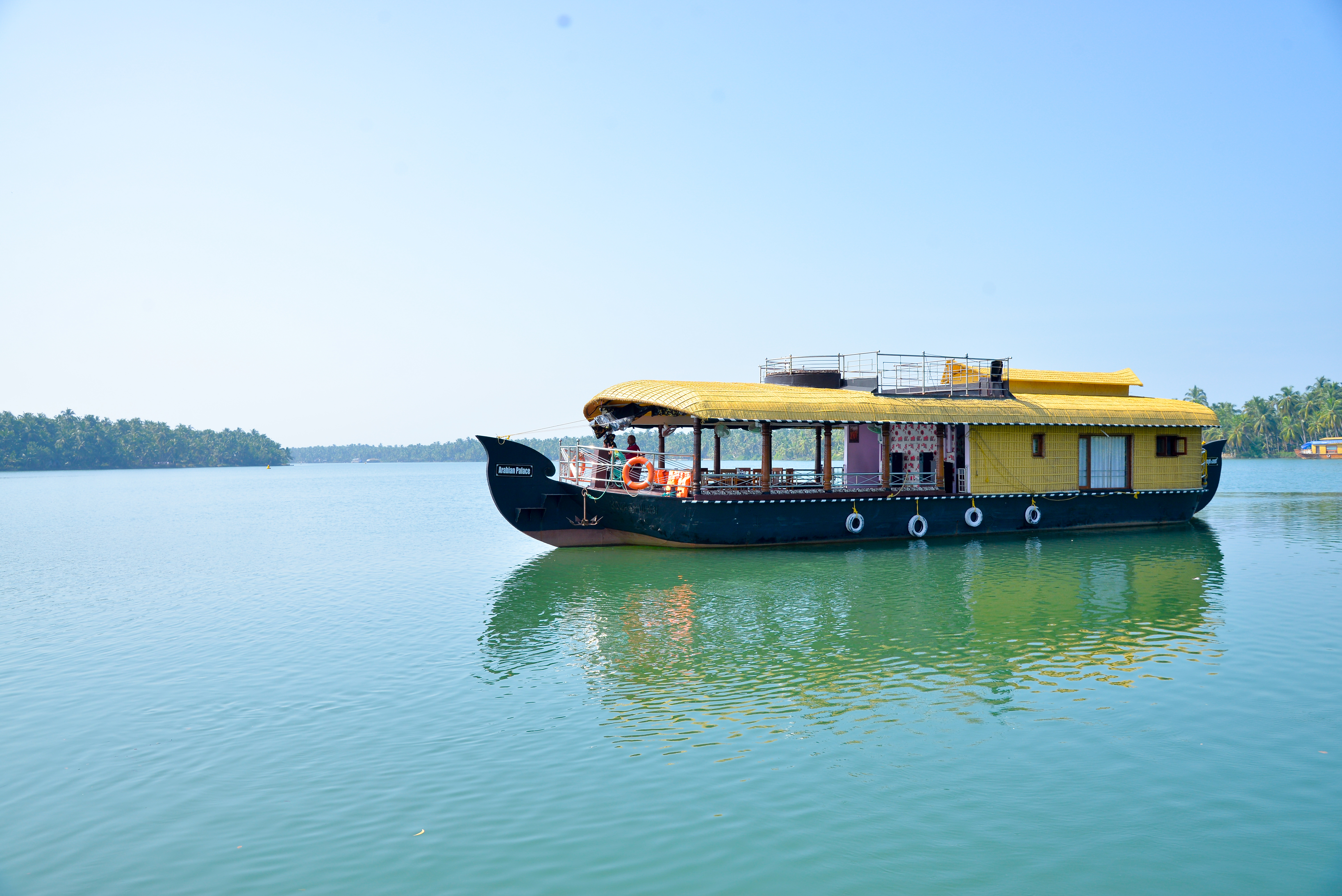
Kavvayi Backwaters in Nileshwaram, Kasaragod

== Hydrography ==
National Waterway 3 from Kollam to Kottappuram covers a distance of 205 km (127 mi) and runs almost parallel to the coastline of southern Kerala, facilitating both cargo movement and backwater tourism. Vembanad, covering an area of 2,033 km^{2} (785 sq mi), is Kerala's largest lake. The lake has a large network of canals that meander through the region of Kuttanad. The important rivers from north to south are the Valapattanam 110 km (68 mi), Chaliyar 169 km (105 mi), Kadalundipuzha 130 km (81 mi), Bharathappuzha 209 km (130 mi), Chalakudy 130 km (81 mi), Periyar 244 km (152 mi), Pamba 176 km (109 mi), Achankovil 128 km (80 mi), Meenachil 75 km (47 mi), and Kalladayar 121 km (75 mi). Other than these, there are 35 more small rivers and rivulets flowing down from the Ghats. Most of these rivers are navigable up to the midland region, in country craft.

Vembanad Lake is the longest backwater in Kerala, as well as the longest lake in India. The Kochi city, Kuttanad, Kumarakom, and Pathiramanal Island are located in this long backwater. The Vellayani Lake, the Pookode Lake, and the Sasthamcotta Lake are the freshwater lakes in Kerala. Sasthamcotta is the largest among them. The Kerala backwaters host three of the world’s Ramsar Convention-listed wetlands: Ashtamudi Lake, Sasthamkotta Lake, and the Vembanad-Kol wetlands are noted as being wetlands of international importance.

== Tourism ==
=== Houseboats ===
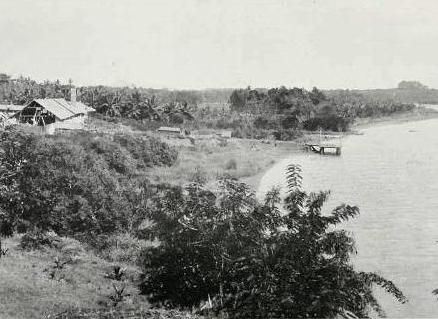
A backwater in the Kollam region, c. 1913

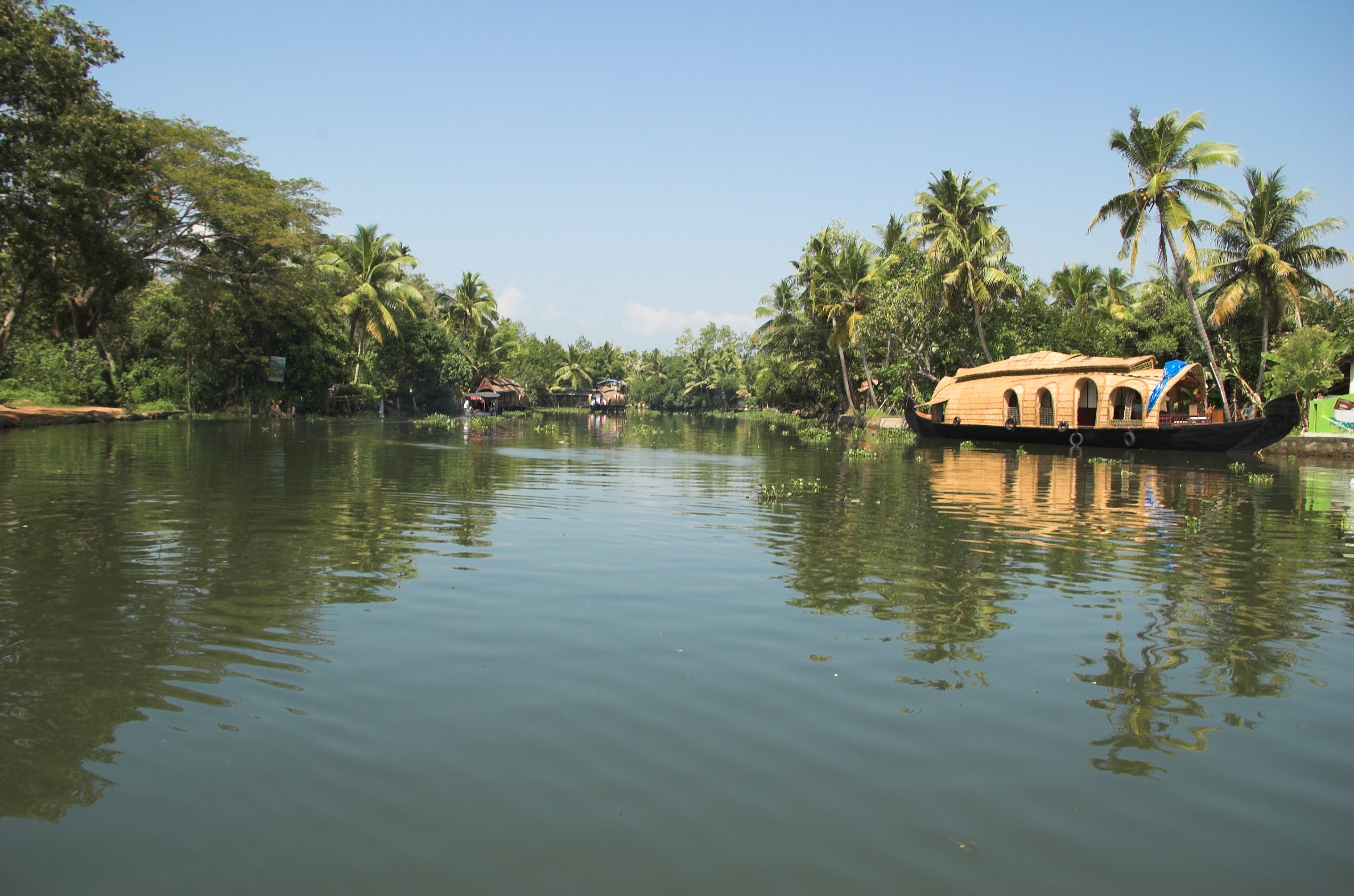
Houseboat on Vembanad lake

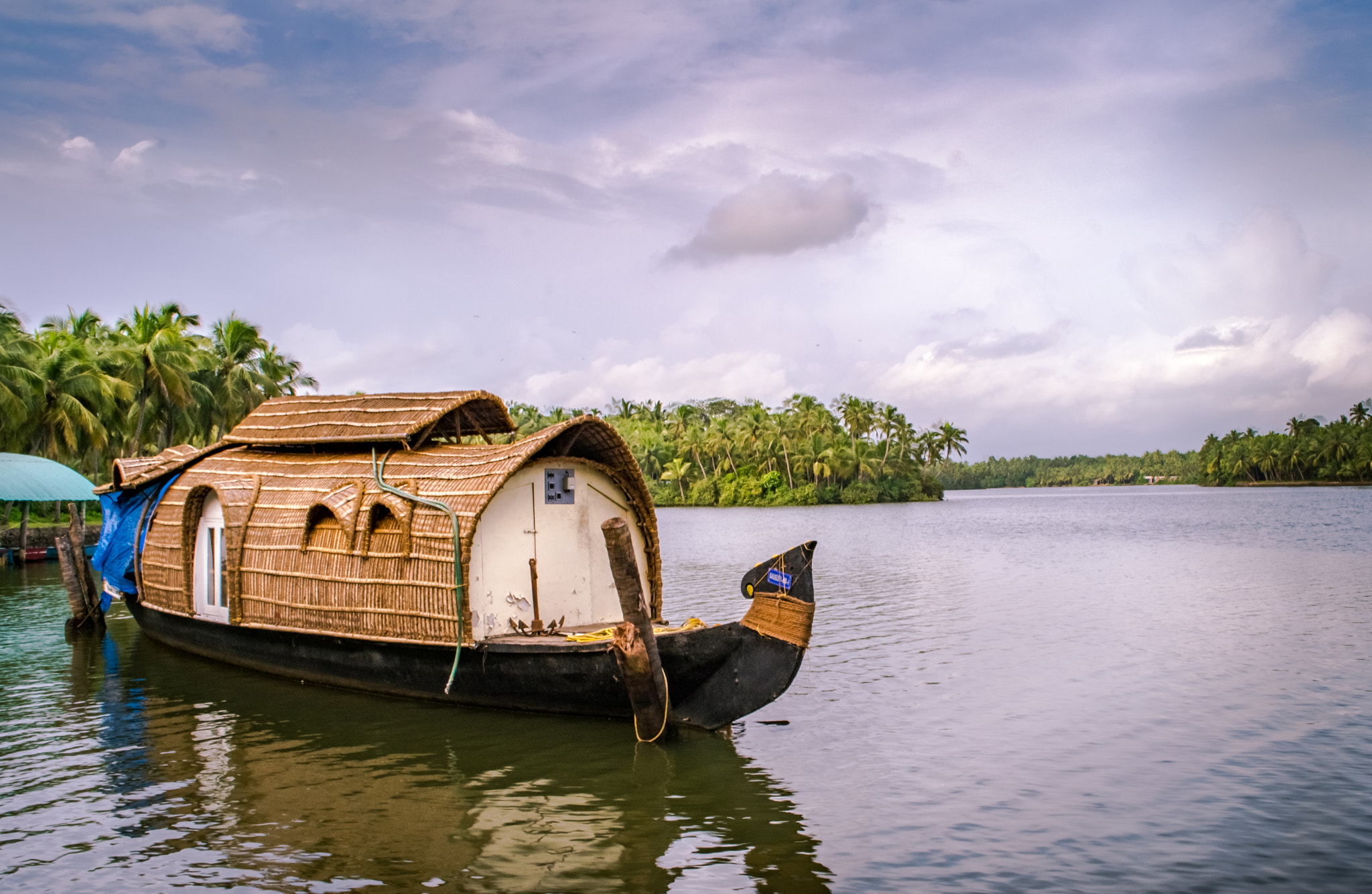
A houseboat at Biyyam backwater, Ponnani, Malappuram

Kettuvallam (Kerala houseboats) in the backwaters are one of the prominent tourist attractions in Kerala. More than 2,000 of these ply the waterways. The Kerala government has classified the tourist houseboats as platinum, gold, and silver.

The Kettuvallam were traditionally used as grain barges to transport the rice harvested in the fertile fields alongside the backwaters. Thatched roof covers over wooden hulls, 100 ft (30 m) in length, protecting them from the elements. At some point in time, the boats were used as living quarters by the royalty. Converted to accommodate tourists, the houseboats have become floating cottages with a sleeping area, western-style toilets, a dining area, and a sit-out on the deck. Most tourists spend the night on a houseboat. Food is cooked on board by the accompanying staff, mostly with a flavour of Kerala. The houseboats are of various patterns and can be hired as per the size of the family or visiting group. The living-dining room is usually open on at least three sides, providing a grand view of the surroundings, including other boats, throughout the day when it is on the move. It is brought to a standstill at times to take food and at night. After sunset, the boat crew provides burning coils to drive away mosquitoes. Ketuvallam are motorised but generally proceed at a slow speed for smooth travel. All Ketuvallam have a generator and most bedrooms are air-conditioned. At times, as per the demand of customers, electricity is switched off, and lanterns are provided to create a rural setting

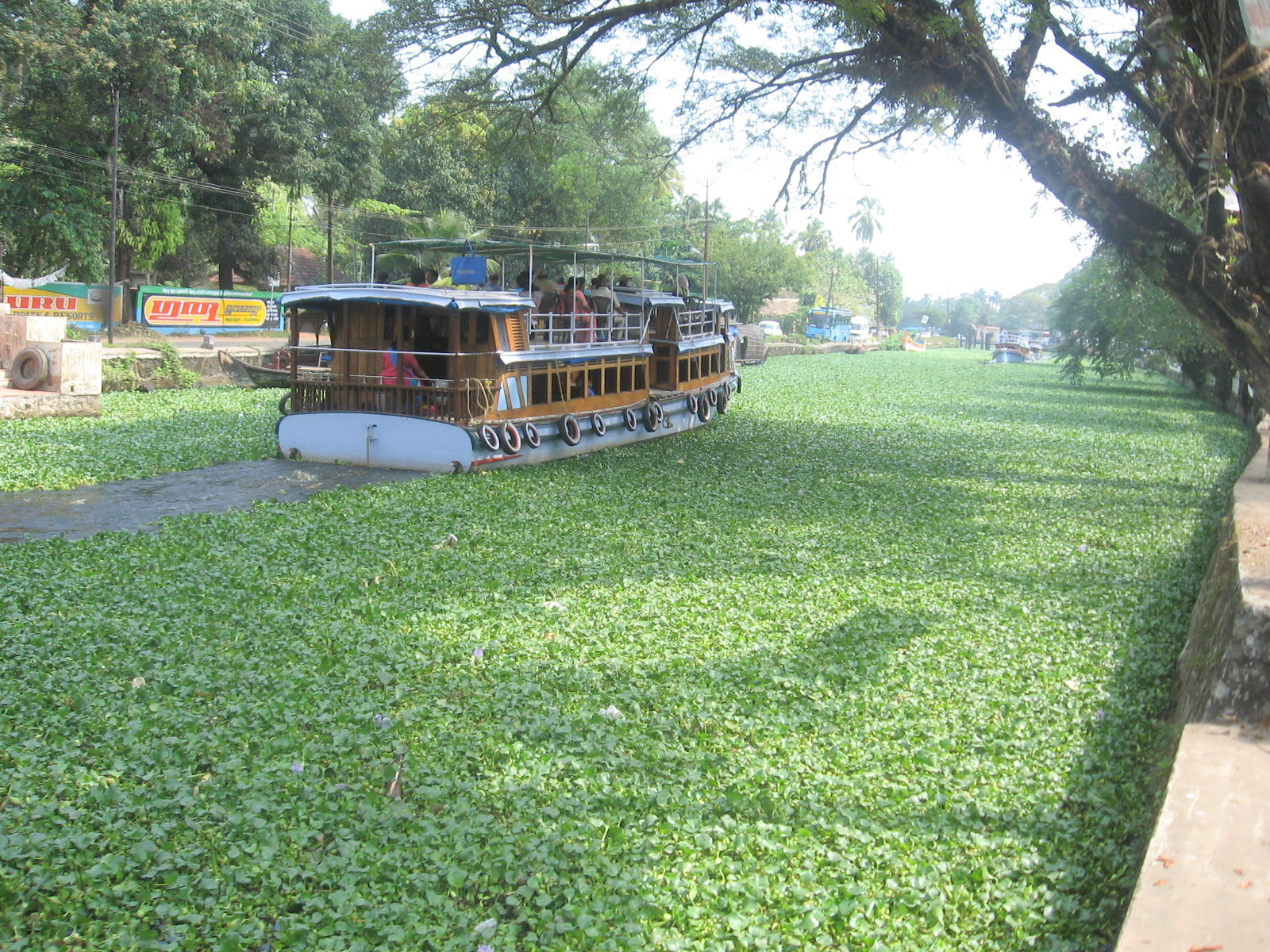
A launch wades through water hyacinth in a canal in Alappuzha district

Beypore, located 10 km (6.2 mi) south of Kozhikode at the mouth of the Chaliyar River, is a famous fishing harbour, port, and boatbuilding centre. Beypore has a 1,500-year tradition of boatbuilding. The skills of the local shipwrights and boatbuilders are widely sought after.

=== Ferry services ===
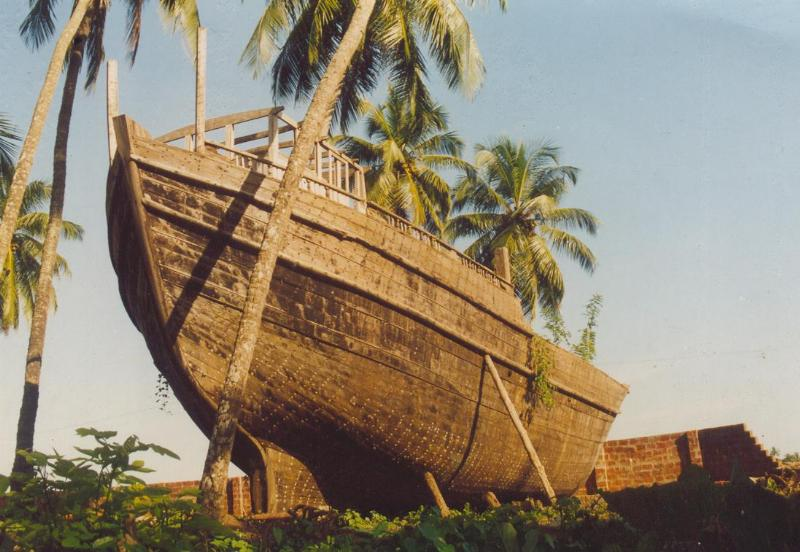
An Uru built at Beypore, Calicut, which is situated at the mouth of the River Chaliyar

Regular ferry services connect most locations on both banks of the backwaters. The Kerala State Water Transport Department operates ferries for passengers as well as tourists. It is the cheapest mode of transport through the backwaters.

=== Resorts ===
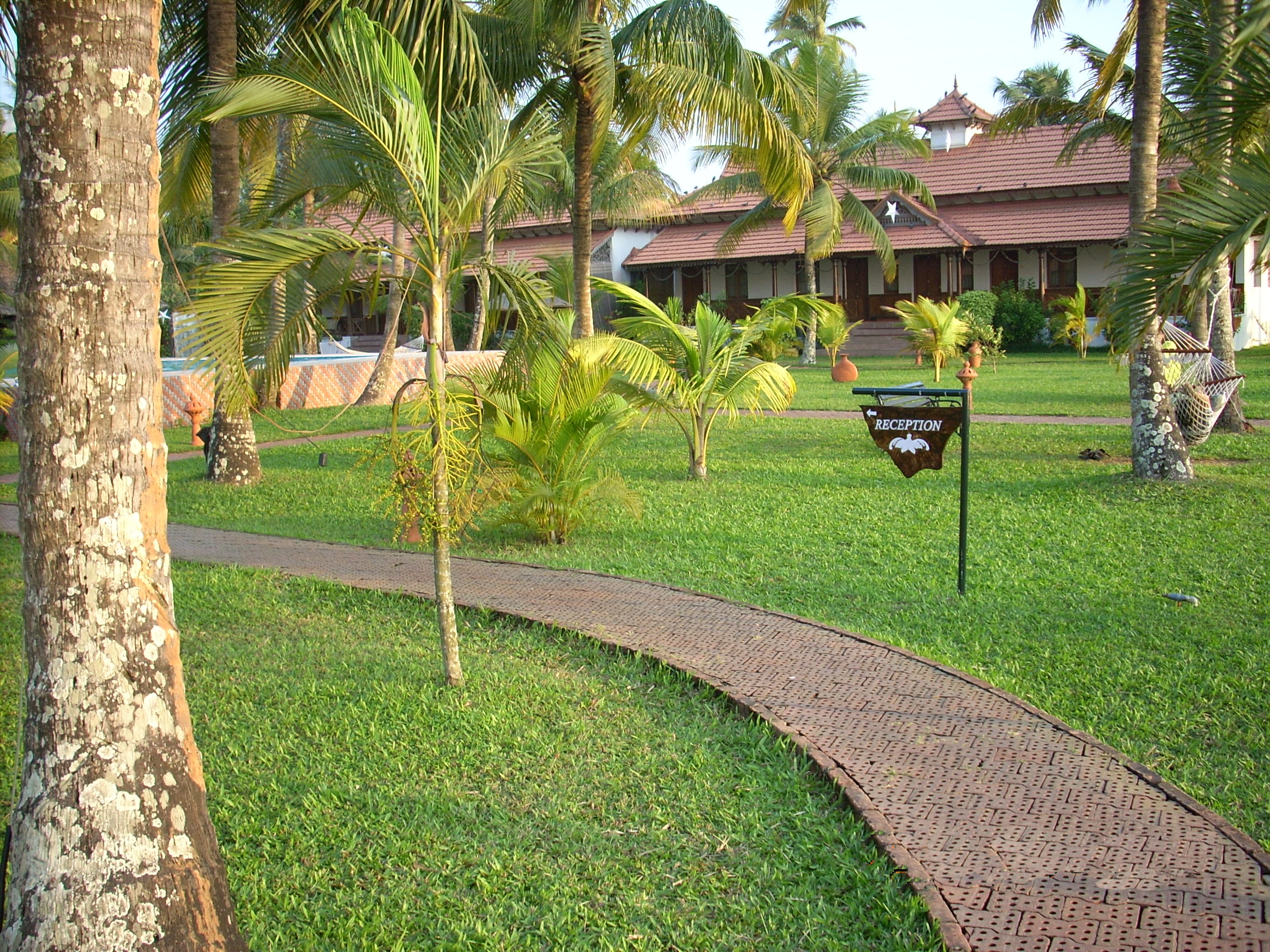
Resort at Kumarakom

Ashtamudi Lake, which was a sleepy destination for years, has been transformed into a busy tourist destination with plush resorts around the Lake and the backwaters. Under the "Jeevananu Ashtamudi, Jeevikkanam Ashtamudi" initiative, Kollam Corporation has introduced upgrades like musical fountains, floating gardens, electric boats, and biodiversity circuits, enriching the backwater tourism experience while reducing environmental impact.

=== Impact on ecosystem ===
The unregulated proliferation of motorised houseboats in the lakes and backwaters has raised concerns regarding the adverse impact of pollution from diesel engines and outboard motors on the fragile ecosystem.

== Economic significance ==
Connected by artificial canals, the backwaters form an economic means of transport, and a large local trade is carried on by inland navigation. Fishing, along with fish curing, is an important industry.

Kerala backwaters have been used for centuries by the local people for transportation, fishing, and agriculture. The region has supported the efforts of the local people to earn a livelihood. In more recent times, agricultural efforts have been strengthened with the reclamation of some backwater lands for rice growing, particularly in the Kuttanad area. Boat-making has been a traditional craft, and so has been the coir industry.

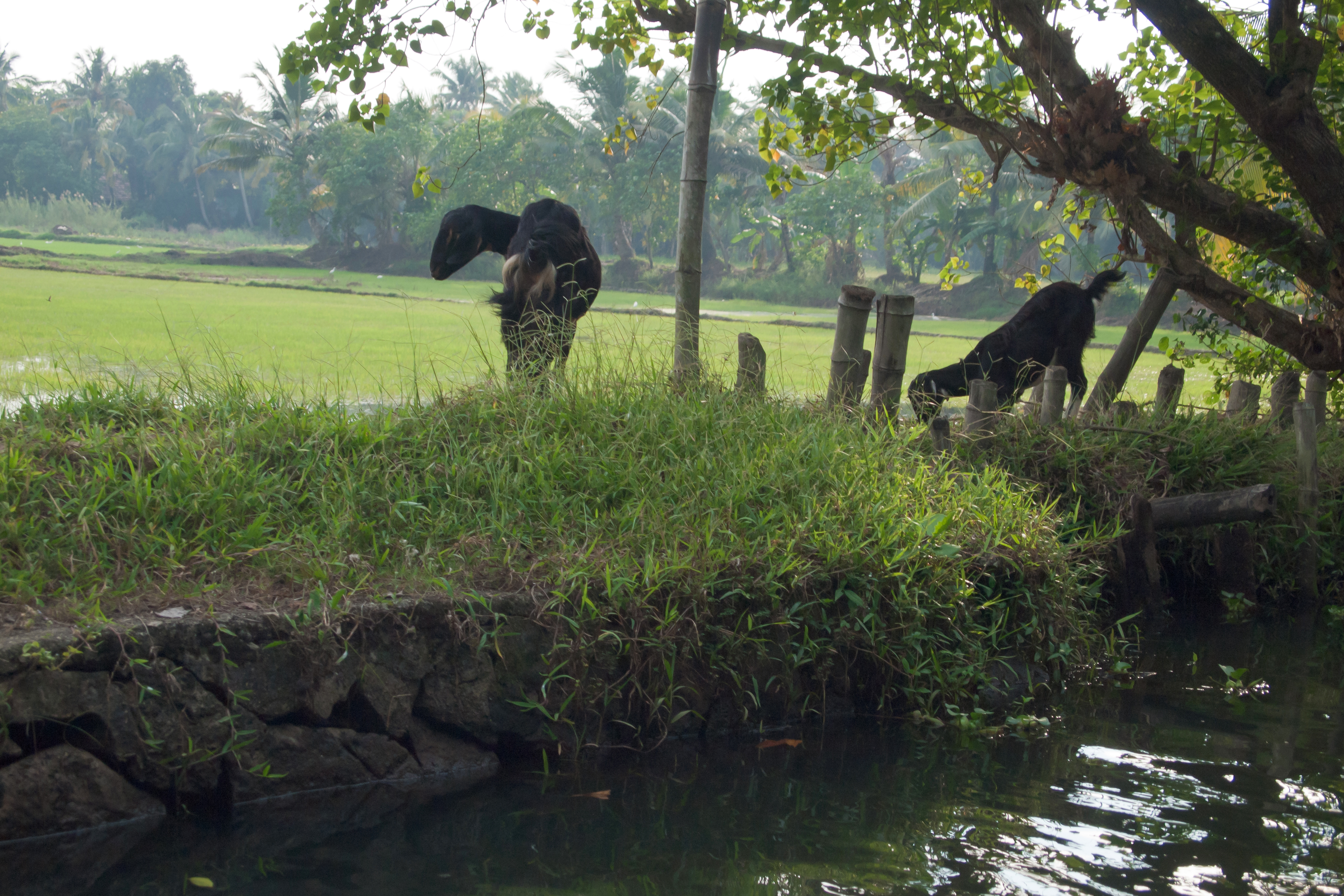
Paddy fields in the Kuttanad region

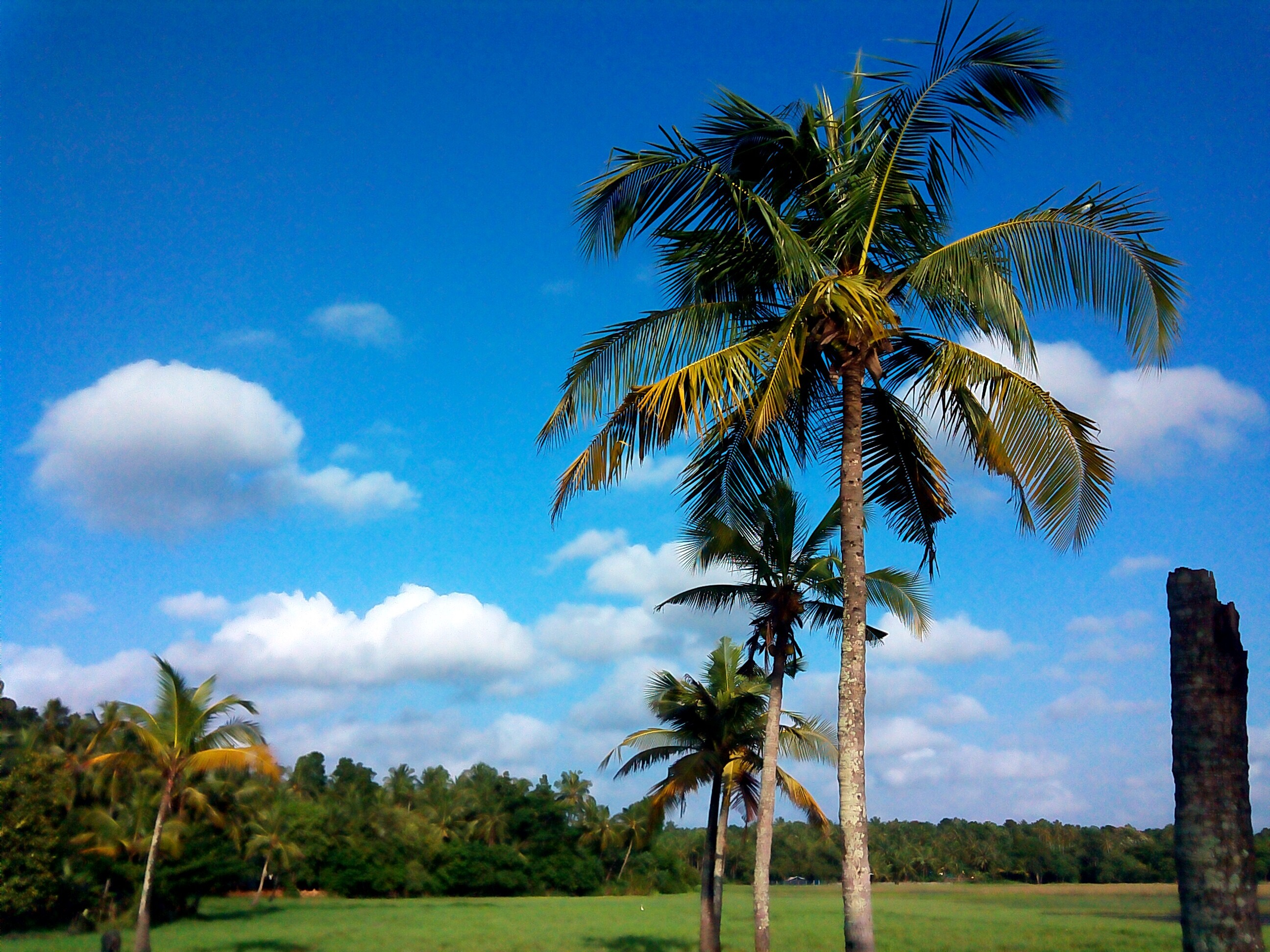
Paddy field at Edappal, on the bank of Biyyam backwater, Ponnani

Kuttanad region is crisscrossed with waterways that run alongside extensive paddy fields, as well as fields of cassava, banana, and yam. The crops are grown on the low-lying ground and irrigated with fresh water from the canal and waterways connected to Vembanad Lake. Palakkad, the granary of Kerala, lies on the banks of the Bharathappuzha River. Thrissur-Ponnani Kole Wetlands are fertile. Ponnani Kole Wetlands lie on the banks of the Biyyam backwater. The area is similar to the dikes of the Netherlands, where land has been reclaimed from the sea, and crops are grown.

== Ecological significance ==
Vembanad Wetland is included in the list of wetlands of international importance, as defined by the Ramsar Convention for the conservation and sustainable use of wetlands.

== Boat races ==
Chundan vallams or snake boats are narrowboats over 100 feet (30 m) long, with a raised prow that stands 10 feet (3.0 m) above water and resembles the hood of a snake. Traditionally, these were used by local rulers to transport soldiers during waterfront wars. In modern times, it has spawned a new sport – the Vallam Kali (boat race). Each Chandan vallam accommodates about a hundred muscular rowers.

Boat races are occasions of great excitement and entertainment, with thousands gathered on the banks to watch and cheer. Most of these races are held in the Kuttanad Region

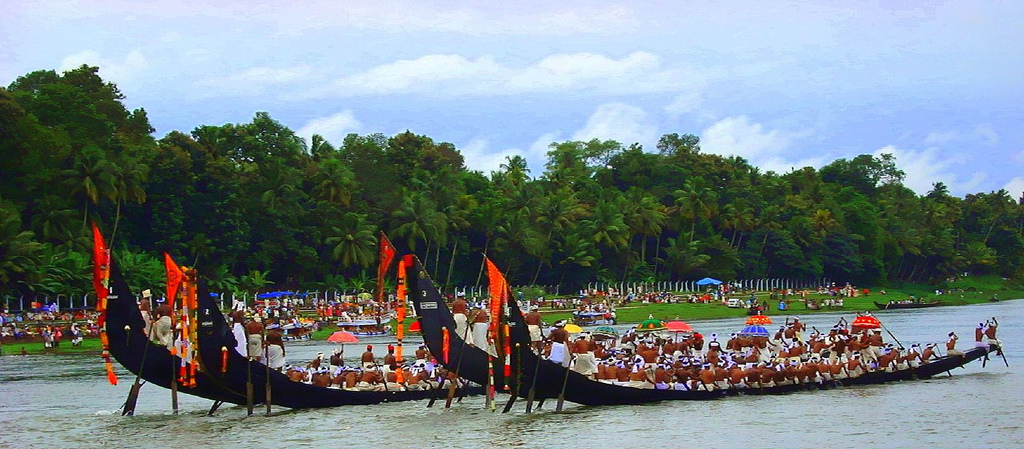
Aranmula Uthrattadi Vallamkali

The boat races start with the Champakulam Moolam Boat Race, which is held on the Pamba River in the village of Champakulam on Moolam day (according to the Malayalam Era, M.E.) of the Malayalam month Midhunam, the day of the installation of the deity at the Ambalappuzha Sree Krishna Temple.

When Jawaharlal Nehru visited Kerala in 1952, four traditional Chundan valloms went to receive him. A snake boat race was organized for him. He was so impressed that when he went back to Delhi, he sent back a gleaming silver trophy for a boat race. Even today, the 1.5 km Nehru Trophy Boat Race is the most prestigious.

The Thazhathangadi boat race, held every year on the Meenachil River at Thazhathangadi, Kottayam, is one of the oldest and most popular boat races in the state. In 1956, the emperor of Ethiopia, Haile Selassie, visited Thazhathangadi during his imperial tour of India and witnessed the boat race. Subsequently, the winners of the race were given the Haile Selassie Ever Rolling Trophy.

Other renowned boat races are: Indira Gandhi Boat Race, Champakulam Moolam Boat Race, Aranmula Uthrattadi Vallamkali, Payippad Jalotsavam, Kallada Boat Race, and Kumarakom Boat Race.

== Backwater regions ==
=== Kuttanad ===
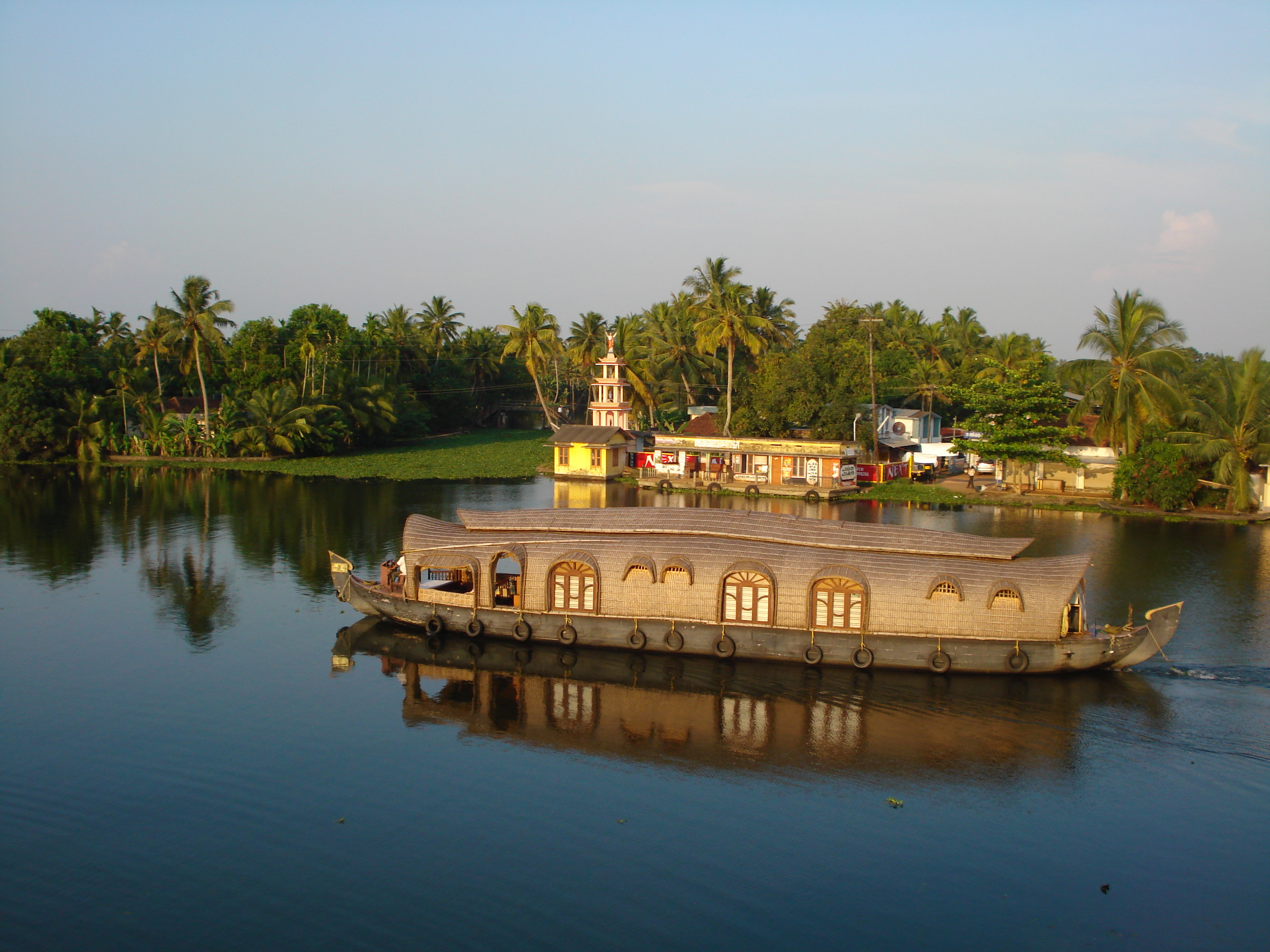
A houseboat - Scene from Nedumudi, Kuttanad

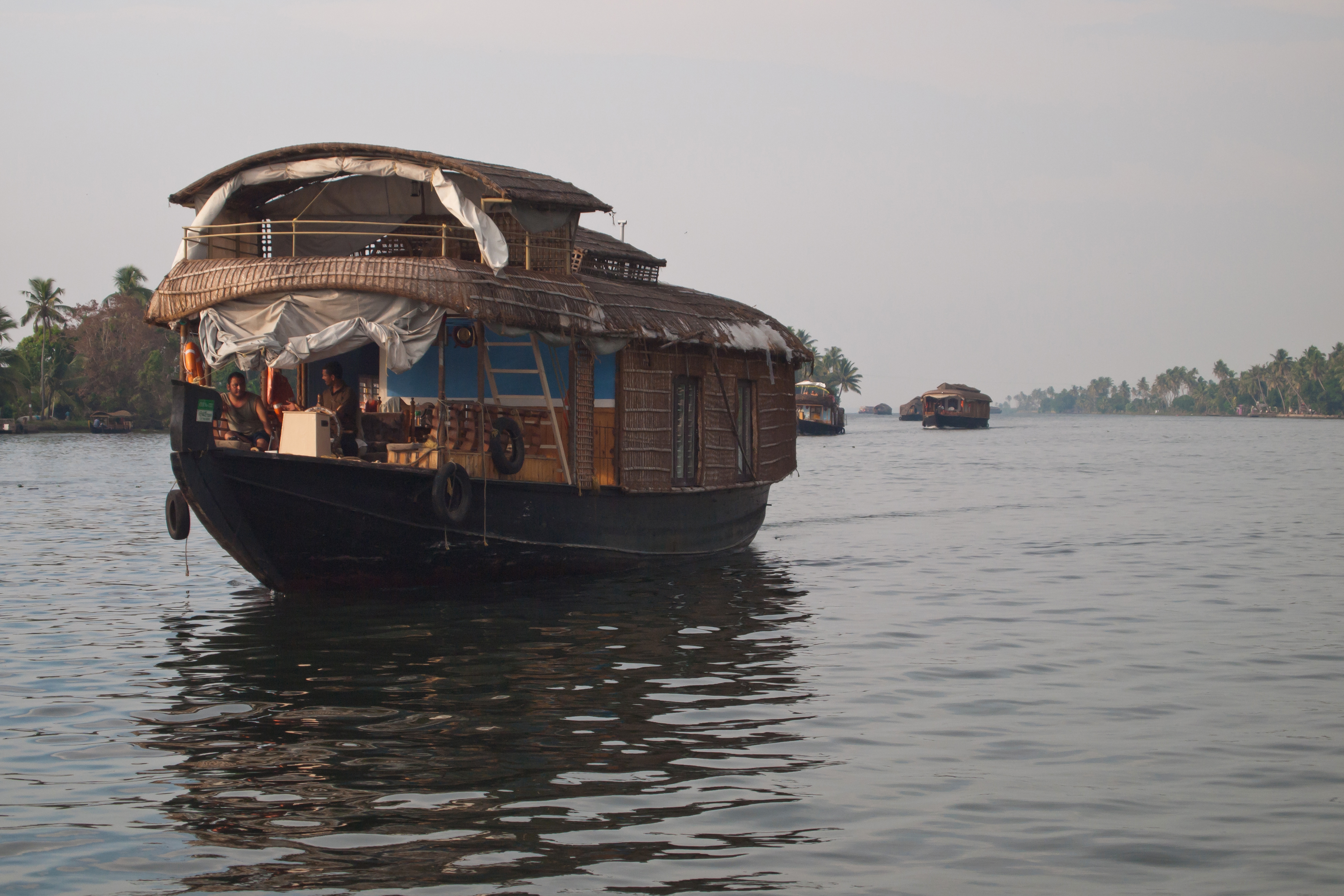
Houseboat on the lake

Important in the ancient history of South India, Kuttanadu is a region spanning the Alappuzha and Kottayam districts; it is well known for its vast paddy fields and geographical peculiarities. The region is the lowest-lying of any in India and is one of the few places in the world where farming is carried out around 1.2 to 3.0 meters (4 to 10 ft) below sea level. Four of Kerala's major rivers—the Pamba, Meenachil, Achankovil, and Manimala—flow into the region, and it is well known for its boat races.

Vembanad Lake, the largest lake in Kerala, is at the heart of Backwater tourism, with hundreds of kettuvallams plying it and numerous resorts on its banks. The Kumarakom Bird Sanctuary is located on the east coast of the lake.

The major occupation in Kuttanadu is farming, with rice the most important agricultural product; it is the major rice producer in the state. This activity gives the area its moniker of "The Rice Bowl of Kerala". Large farming areas near Vembanad Lake were reclaimed from the lake. In 2013, the Food and Agriculture Organization (FAO) of the United Nations formally declared the below-sea-level farming system in Kuttanad as Globally Important Agricultural Heritage Systems (GIAHS).

=== Kollam ===
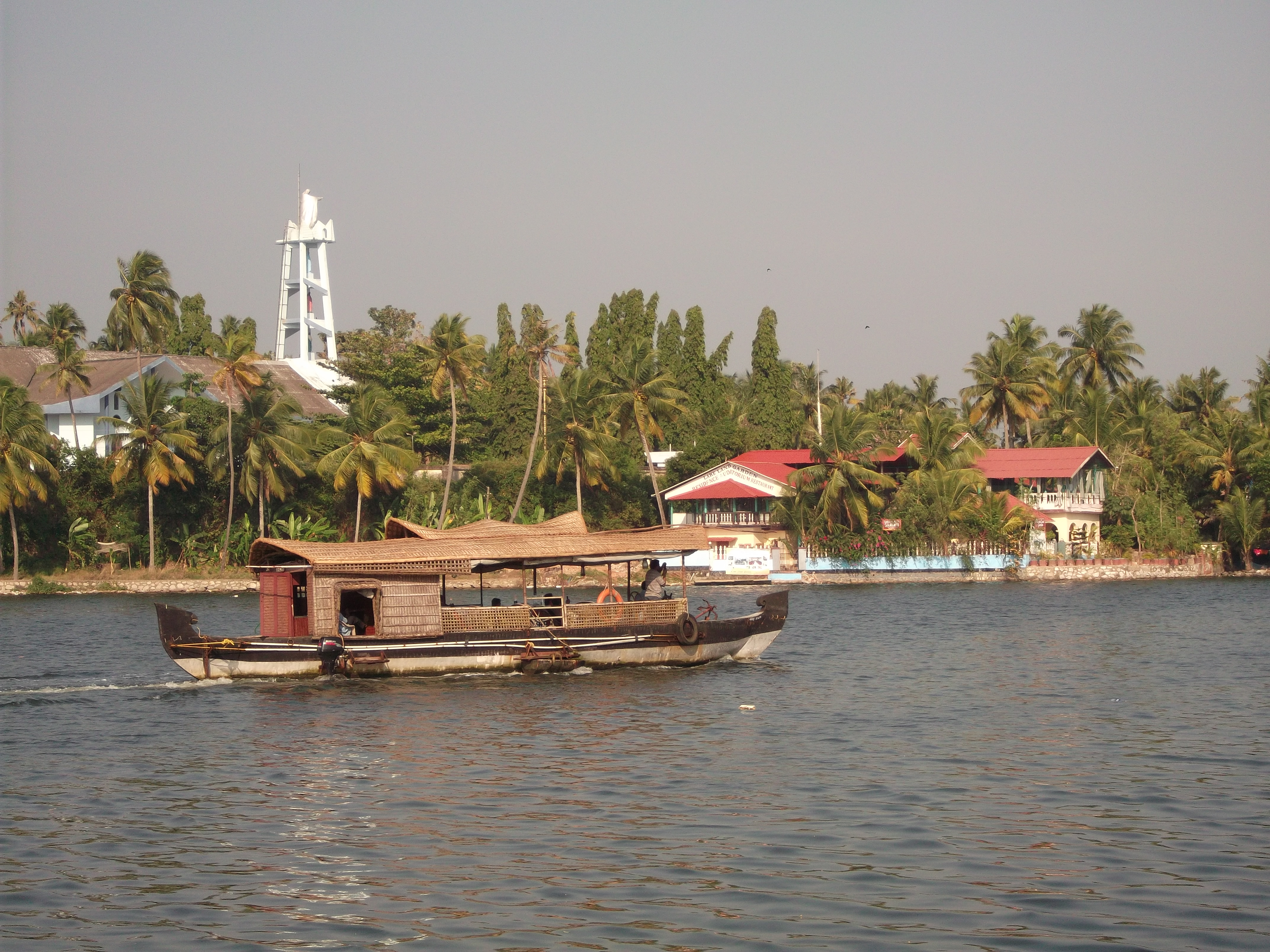
A houseboat - Scene from Trevally, Kollam

Kollam (earlier known as Quilon) was one of the leading trade centres of the ancient world, eulogised by travellers such as Ibn Battuta and Marco Polo. It is also the starting point of the backwater waterways. The Ashtamudi Kayal, known as the gateway to the backwaters, covers about 30 percent of Kollam. Sasthamcotta Kayal, the large freshwater lake, is 28.5 km from Kollam city.

==== Islands of Kollam ====
The islands are some of the most eye‑catching and beautiful features of Lake Ashtamudi, Kollam. Most of these islands are potential tourism spots in the state. The Indian Railways is also planning to develop one of the islands in Kollam for a tourism project. There are both large and small islands, some inhabited and others uninhabited. There are more than 15 islands in Ashtamudi Lake. The important islands in Kollam are:

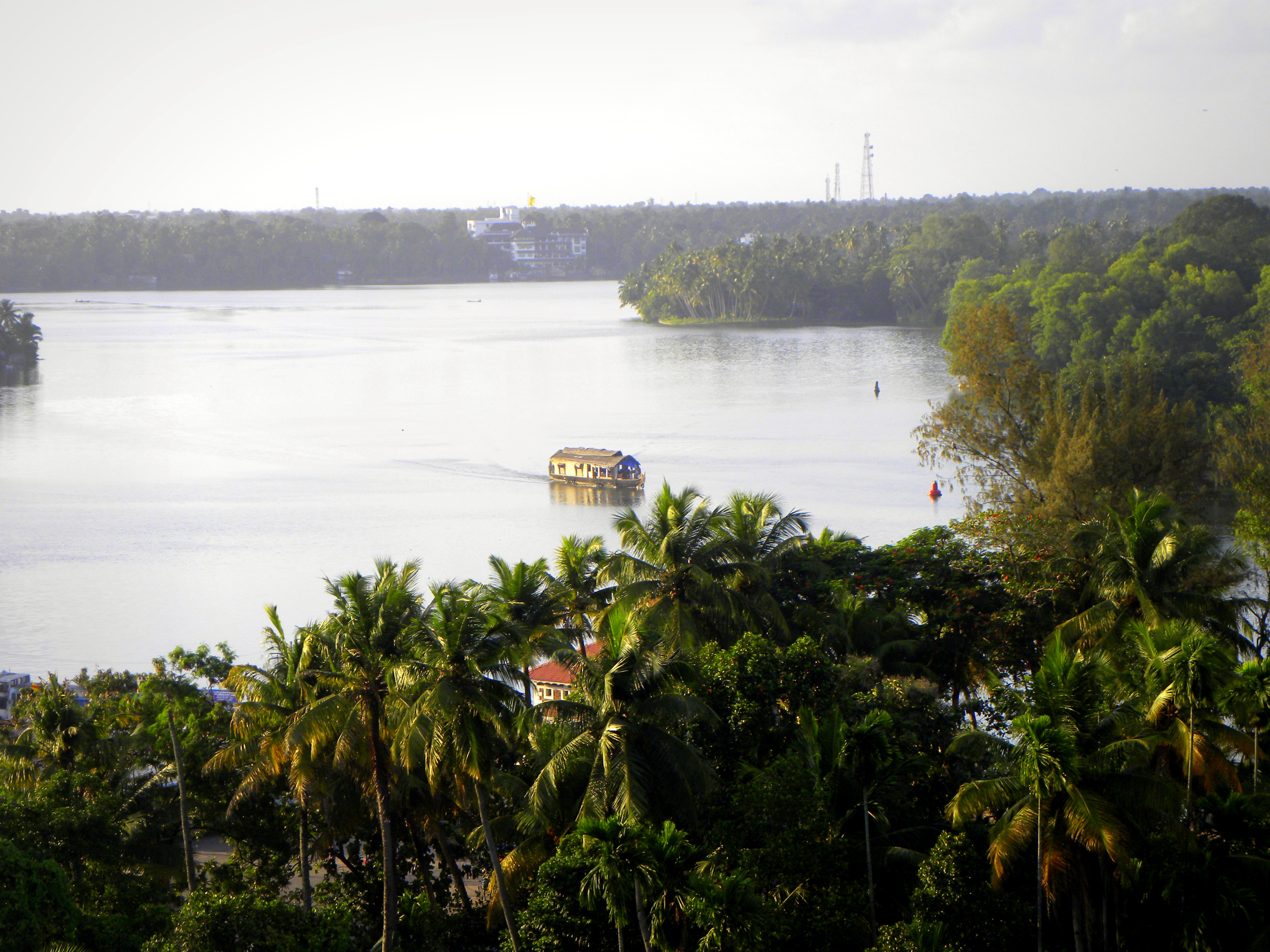
Aerial view of Ashtamudi backwaters

- Munroe Island
- Chavara Thekkumbhagom
- Perungalam
- St. Sebastian Island
- San Thome Island
- Pezhumthuruth
- Kakkathuruth
- Pattamthuruth
- Paliyanthuruthu (Palliyamthuruthu)
- Neettum thuruth
- Puthenthuruth
- Poothuruth
- Pannaykkathuruth
- Veluthuruth
- Neeleswaram Thuruth

==== Estuaries of Paravur ====
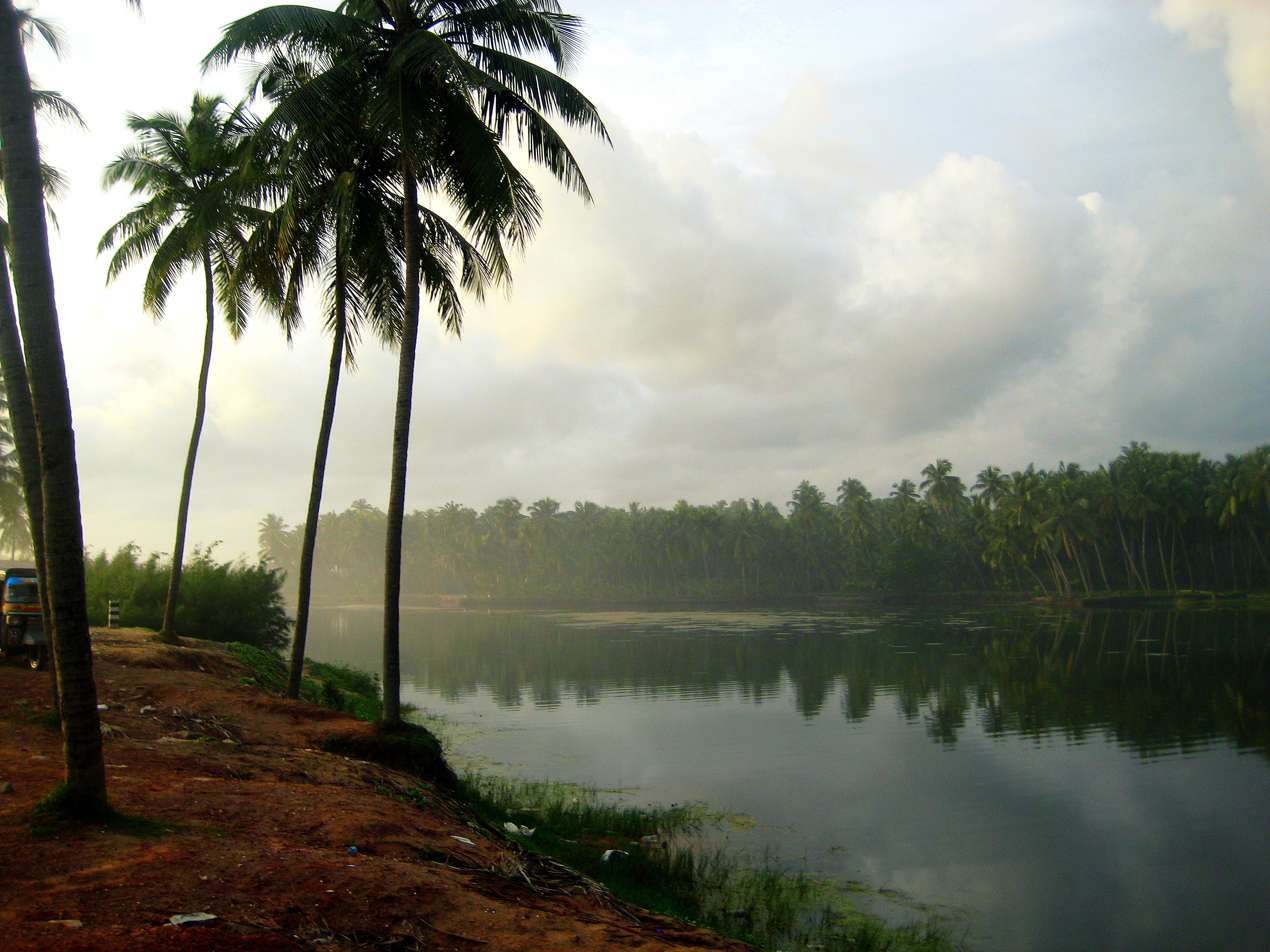
Estuary at Paravur Thekkumbhagam

Paravur Estuaries lie near to the south-western coast of Kollam. It is world-famous for its natural beauty, backwater locations, white-sand beaches and concentration of temples in every square kilometer. The peninsula of Paravur is one of the most visited in Kollam district. Both the north and south tips of Paravur town have a peninsula and an estuary. Pozhikara is north and Thekkumbhagam is south of Paravur. Another estuary mouth in Pozhikara, located very close to the Pozhikara Devi Temple, was breached in 2014 under the supervision of the Water Resources Department (WRD), after a gap of 14 years.

=== Munroe Island ===
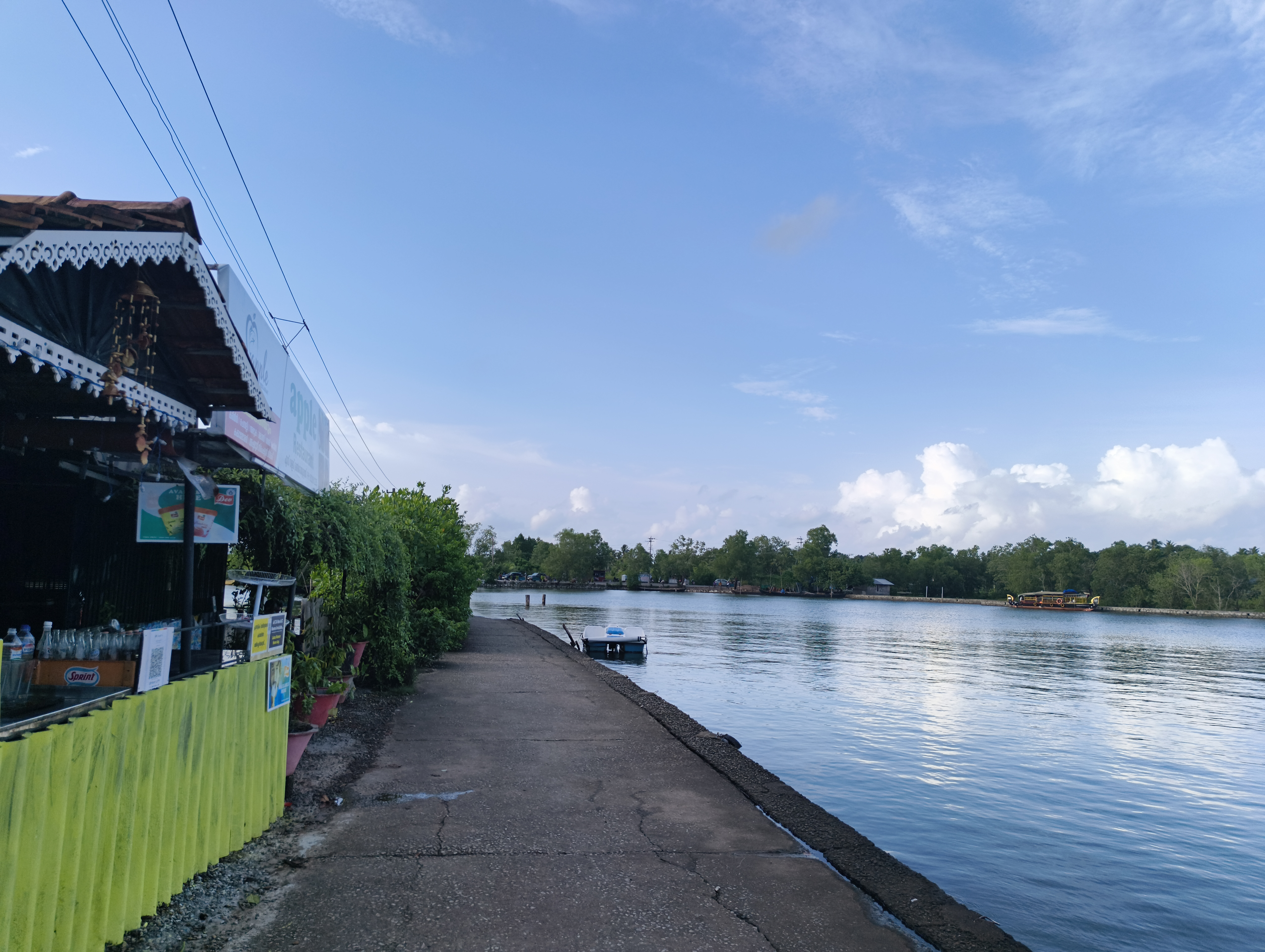
Street View of Mundro Island

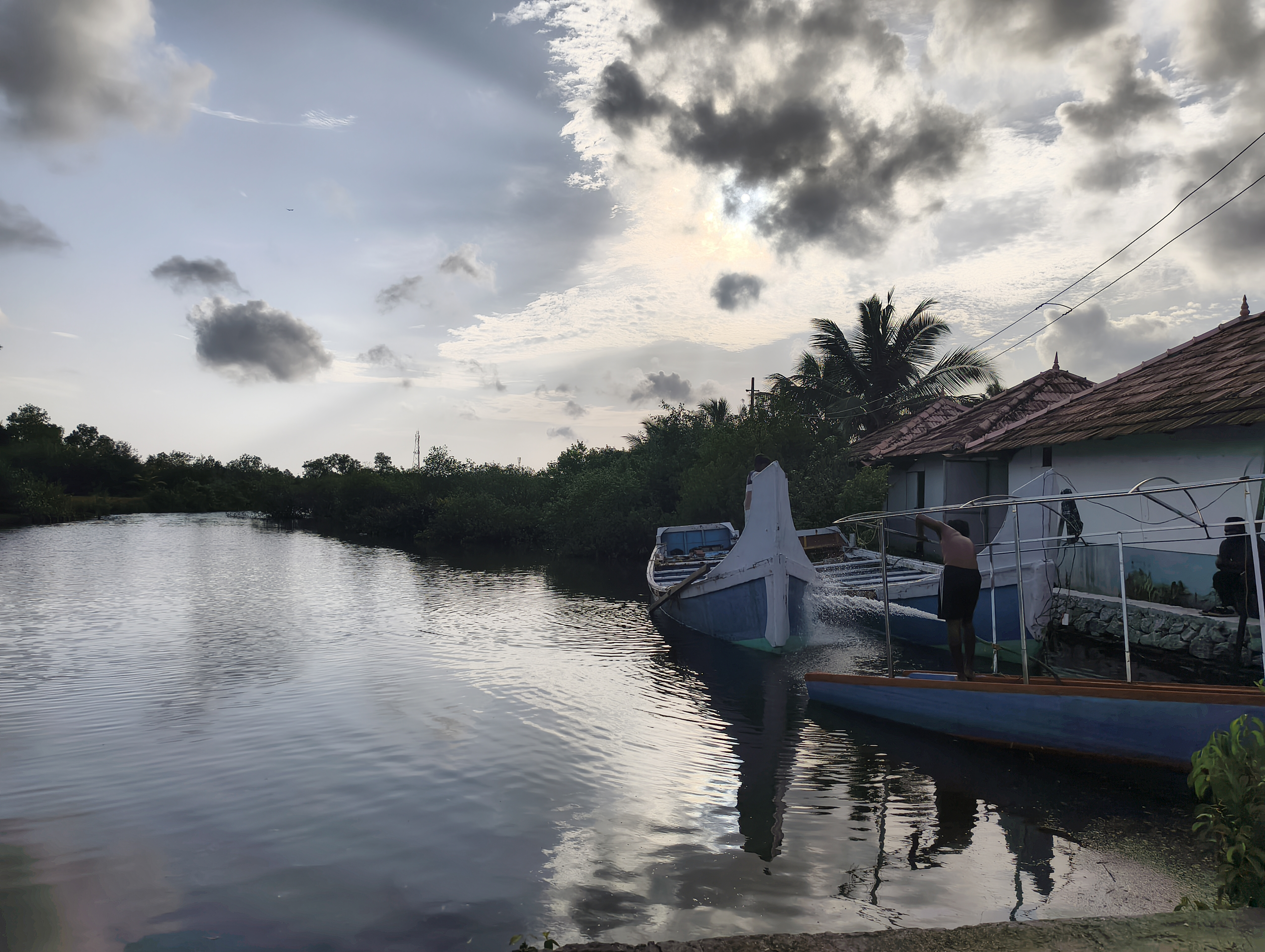
Boat view from Mundro Island

Munroethuruth or Munroe Island is a place surrounded by the Kallada River, Ashtamudi Lake, and Sasthamkotta Lake in Kollam district. Munroe Island is a cluster of eight tiny islands. Blessed with a number of crisscrossing canals and zigzag water channels, this island is a host to migratory birds from various countries. You can watch birds such as kingfishers, woodpeckers, egrets, bee-eaters, Crow pheasant, and Paddy Birds. There is a chance to see the traditional Indian spice plants such as Pepper, Nutmeg, and Cloves. ()

The first community tourism program in the State will start functioning from the Munroe-Thuruthu islands. Coir making is a home industry for almost all the villagers. It is interesting to watch the coir making by the village ladies with the help of weaving Wheels. They make the coir ropes by hand. In addition to this, on the way, you can see the process of extracting coconut oil from the "copra" [dried coconut]. Among the routine traditional engagements, duck, poultry farming, and prawn breeding are common in all houses.

=== Thiruvananthapuram ===
==== Vellayani Lake ====
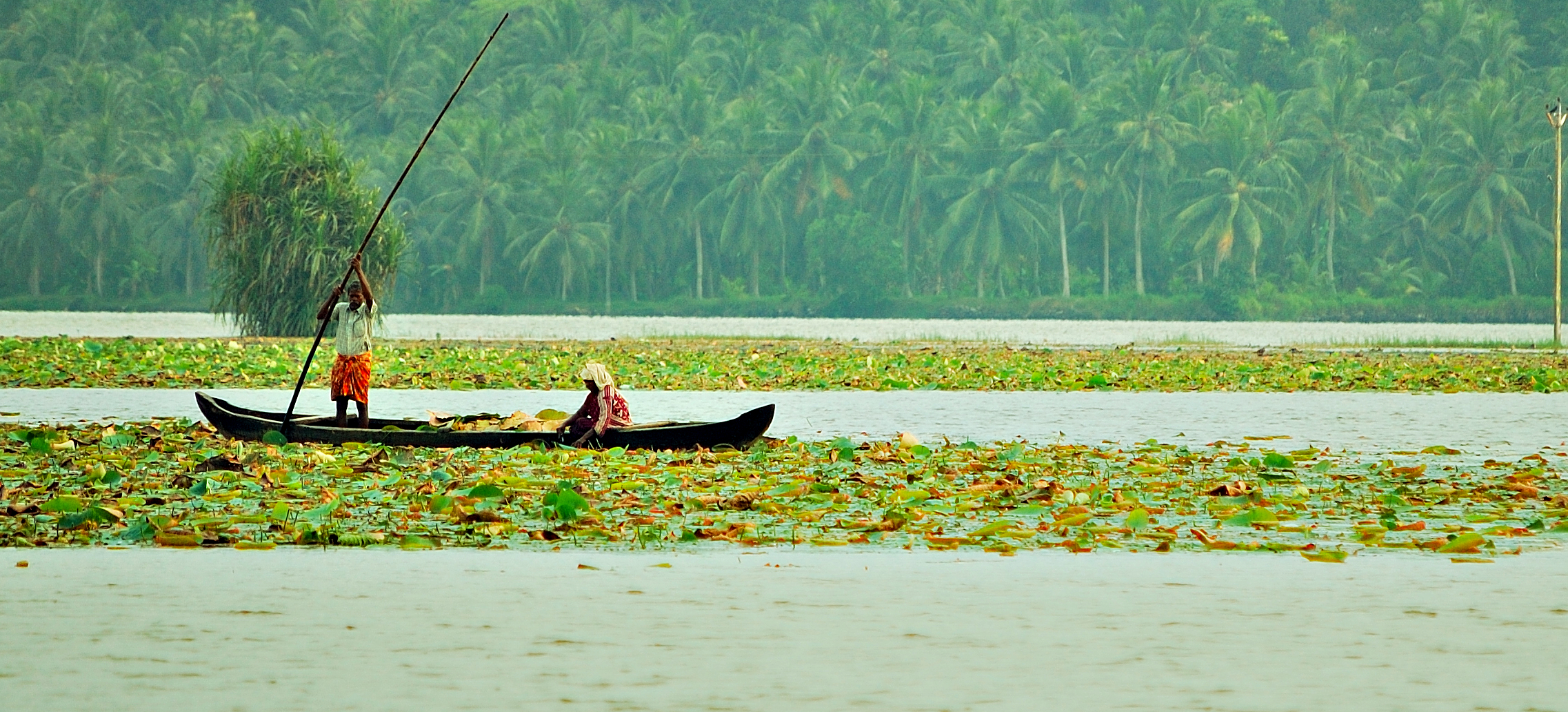
Vellayani Lake

It is one of the freshwater lakes in Kerala. It is located in the city of Thiruvananthapuram, which is also Kerala's administrative headquarters. It is located nearer to Kovalam beach.

==== Thiruvallam ====
Thiruvallam backwaters are just 6 km from Thiruvananthapuram, the state capital. Known for its canoe rides, Thiruvallam is becoming increasingly popular with tourists. Two rivers, the Killi and the Karamana, come together at Thiruvallam. Not far from Thiruvallam is the Veli Lagoon, where there are facilities for water sports, a waterfront park, and a floating bridge. The Akkulam Boat Club, which offers boating cruises on Akkulam Lake and a park for children, is also a popular tourist attraction near Thiruvallam.

=== Wayanad ===
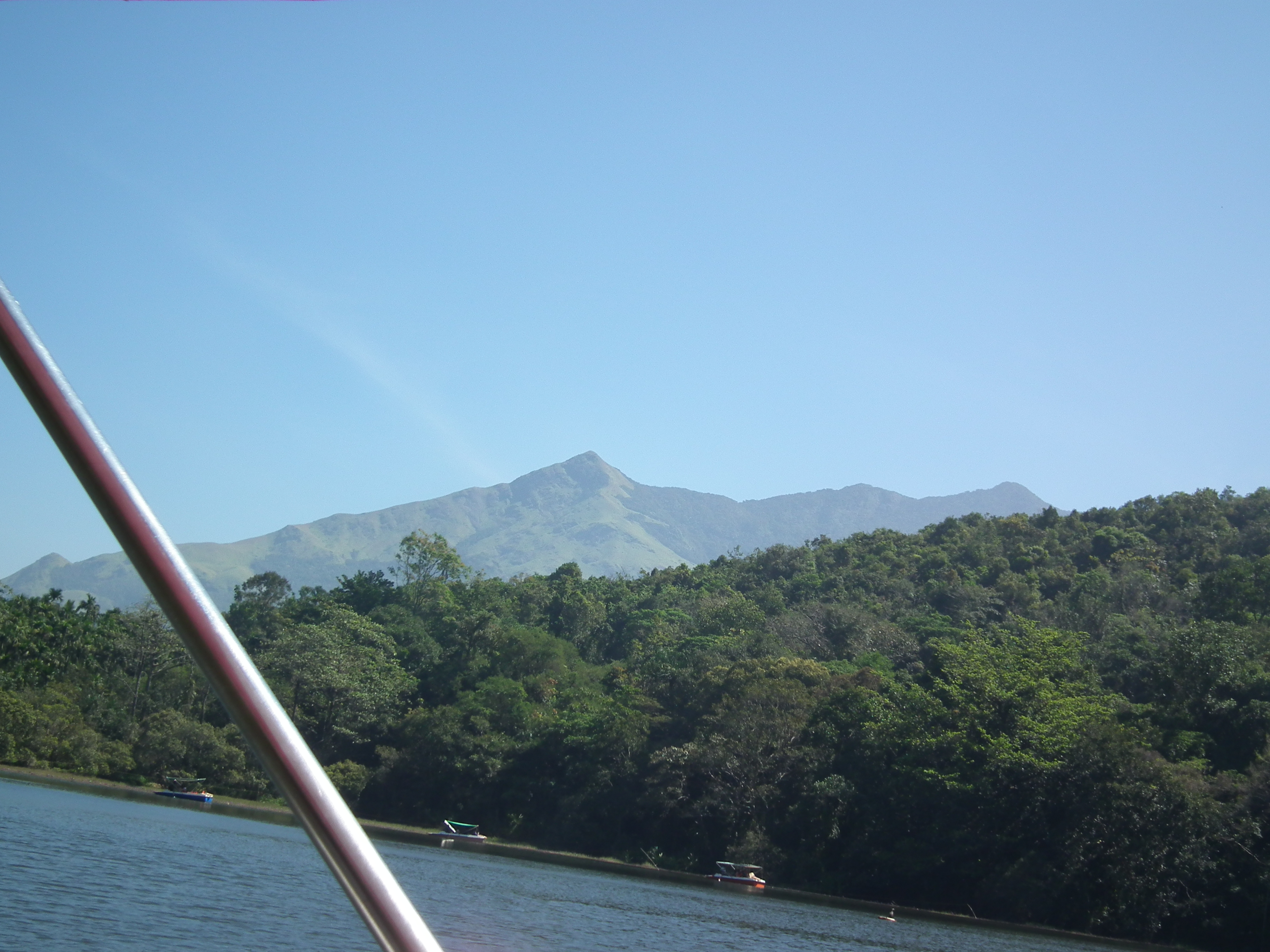
Pookode Lake, one of the seven inland backwaters in Kerala.

==== Pookode Lake ====
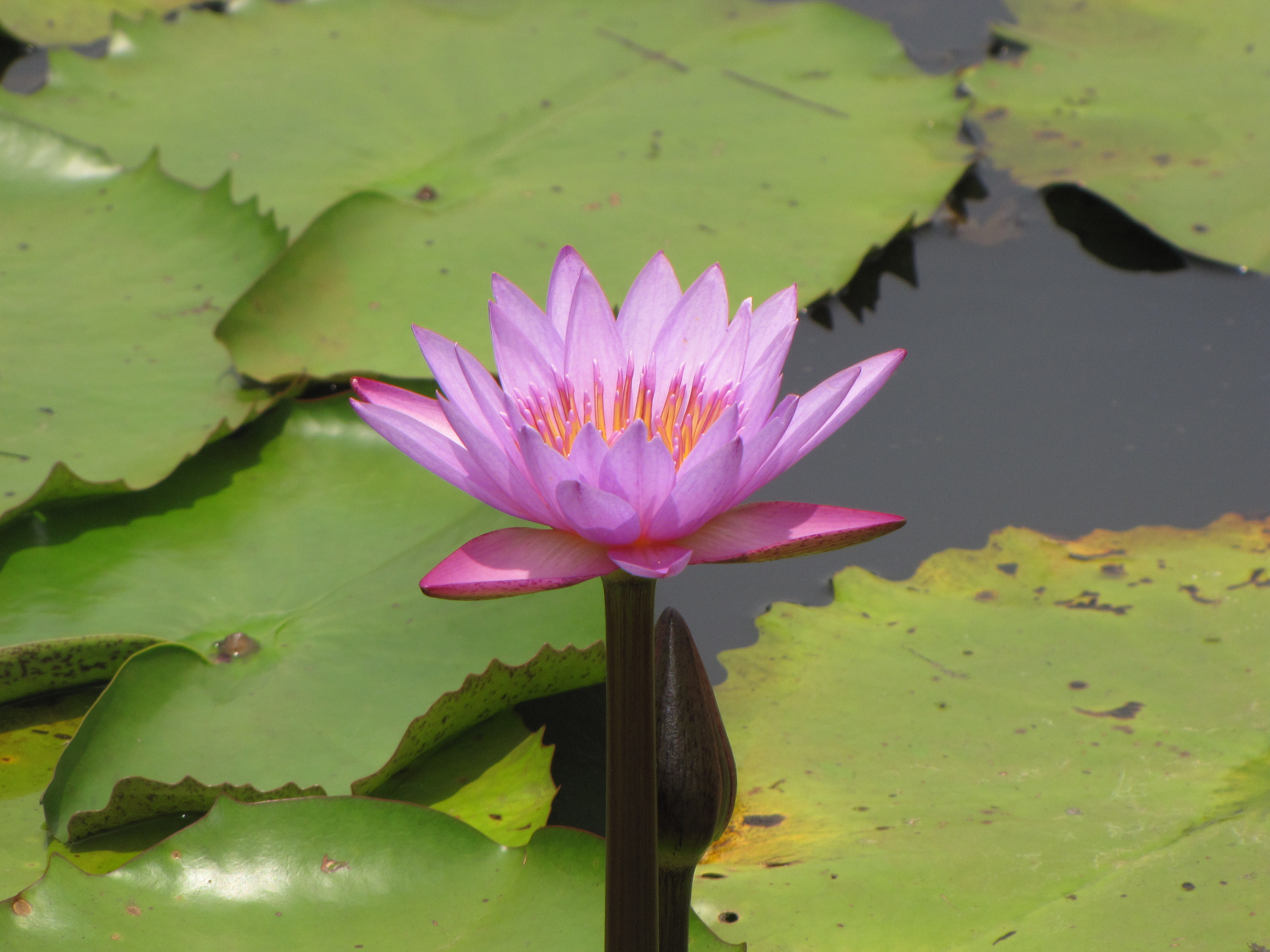
Nelumbo nucifera in Pookode Lake

Wayanad is home to one of the state's freshwater lakes, Pookode Lake. It is also one of the 7 inland navigation backwaters in Kerala. Panamaram, the rivulet which ultimately becomes Kabani River, originates from the Pookode lake. It is spread across an area of 8.5 hectares and has a maximum depth of 6.5 meters.

=== Kannur ===
Kavvayi backwater is a backwater near Payyannur in the district of Kannur. Kavvayi Backwaters form the biggest wetland in north Kerala and is used for recreation. Five rivers, Kavvayi River and its tributaries- Kankol, Vannathichal, Kuppithodu, and Kuniyan – flow together to form the Kavvayi kayal, and there are many small islands.

=== Kasargod ===
Kasargod in north Kerala is a backwater destination, known for rice cultivation, coir processing, and lovely landscape. It has the sea to the west and the Western Ghats to the north and east. Cruise options are Chandragiri and Valiyaparamba near Kavvayi Backwater. Chandragiri is situated 4 km to the southeast of Kasargod town and takes tourists to the historic Chandragiri fort. Valiyaparamba is a scenic backwater stretch near Kasargod. Four rivers flow into the backwaters near Kasargod, and there are many small islands along these backwater stretches, where birds can be seen.

=== Kozhikode ===
Kozhikode has backwaters which are largely unexplored by tourist hordes. Elathur, the Canoly Canal and the Kallayi River are favourite haunts for boating and cruising. Korapuzha, the venue of the Korapuzha Jalotsavam, is a popular water sports destination.

=== Malappuram ===
The coastal region of Malappuram contains backwaters like Biyyam, Manoor, Veliyankode, Kodinhi, etc. Biyyam backwater, which lies south of the Bharathappuzha River (which is also the second-longest river in Kerala), is the largest among them. Biyyam backwater and Conolly Canal together empty into the Arabian Sea near the Puthuponnani promontory.

== Literature ==
Two prominent writers in the region are Thakazhi Sivasankara Pillai and Arundhati Roy.

Thakazhi Sivasankara Pillai (1912–1999), the Padmabhusan and Jnanpith and Sahitya Akademi award-winning writer, was born in Thakazhi village in Alappuzha district. He wrote in Malayalam. His novel Chemmeen has been translated into most Indian languages and several foreign languages.

Arundhati Roy (born 1961) was brought up in Ayemenem near Kottayam, and her Booker Prize–winning The God of Small Things is set in Kerala.

== Movies ==
A number of movies were filmed in the backwaters around Alleppey and other parts of the state.

- Numerous Malayalam movies

Some other major movies include

- Most scenes of Tamil movie Autograph and Kannada movie My Autograph
- Crucial scenes in Tamil movie Vinnaithaandi Varuvaayaa and its remakes in Hindi Ekk Deewana Tha, Telugu Ye Maaya Chesave
- Song "Jiya jale" and Scenes in the Hindi movie Dil Se..
- Hindi movie Tashan
- Hindi film Alone
- Tamil movie Kuselan

== Photo gallery ==
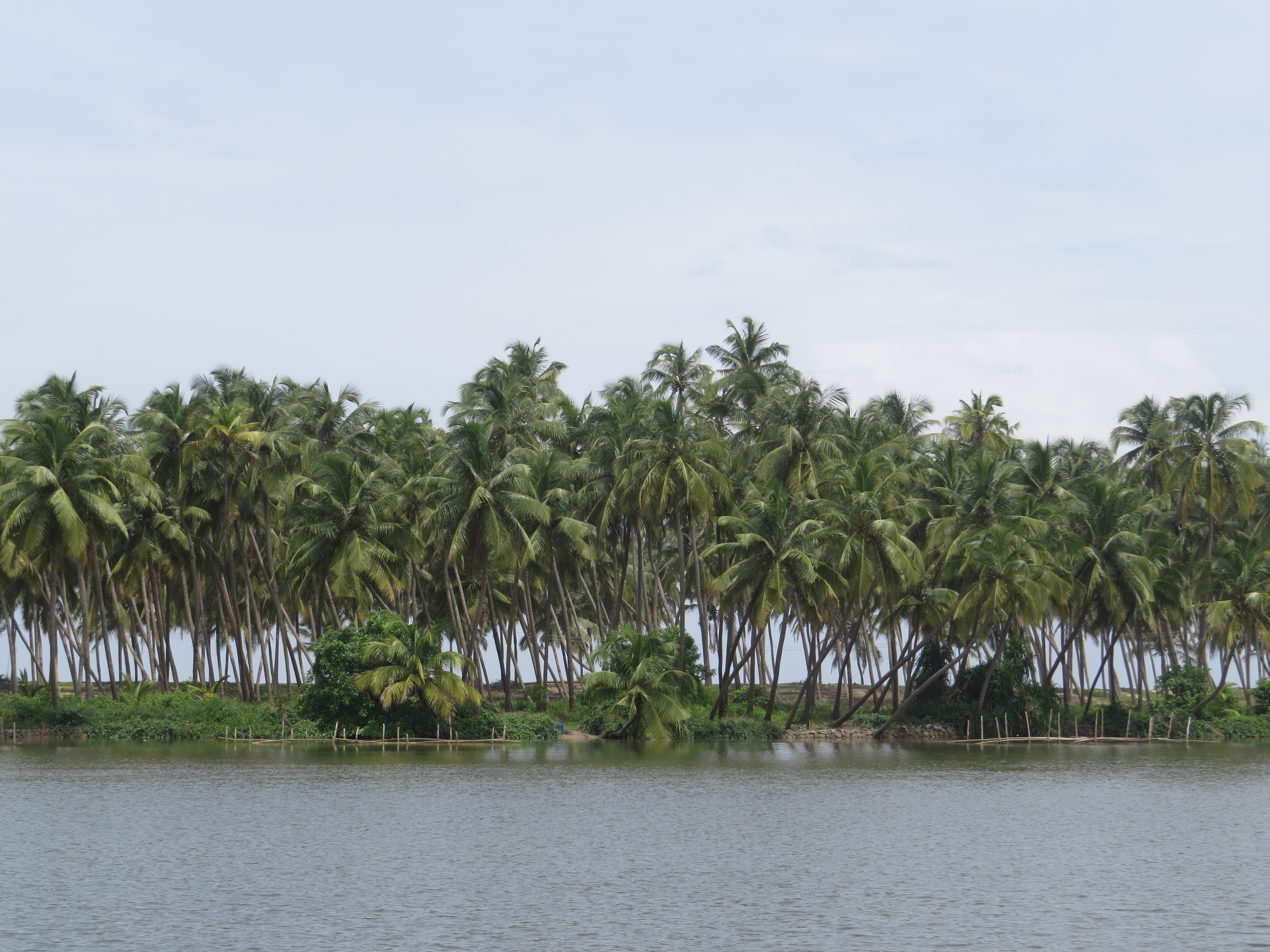
Kavvayi Backwaters, Kannur

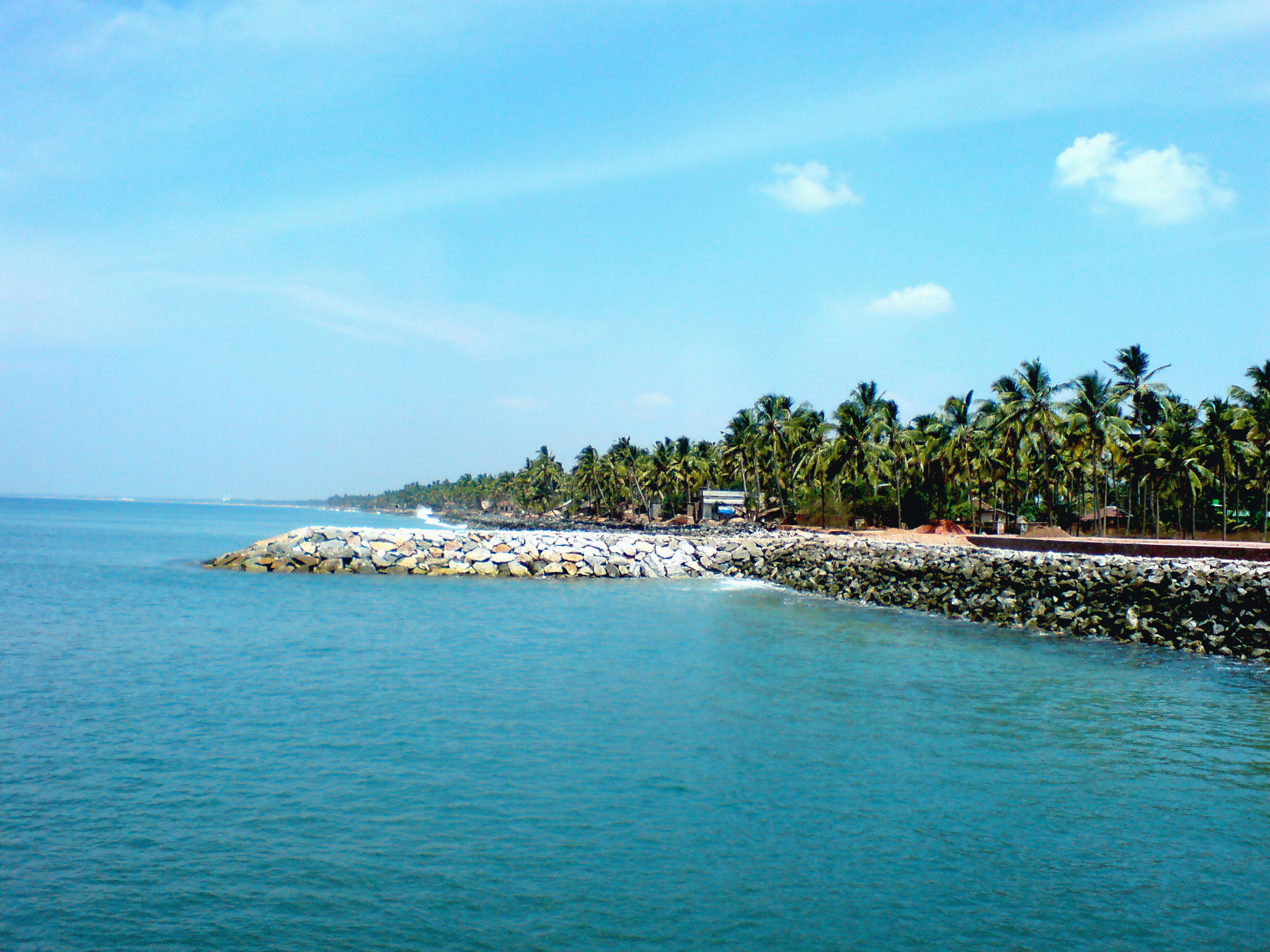
Estuary in Paravur

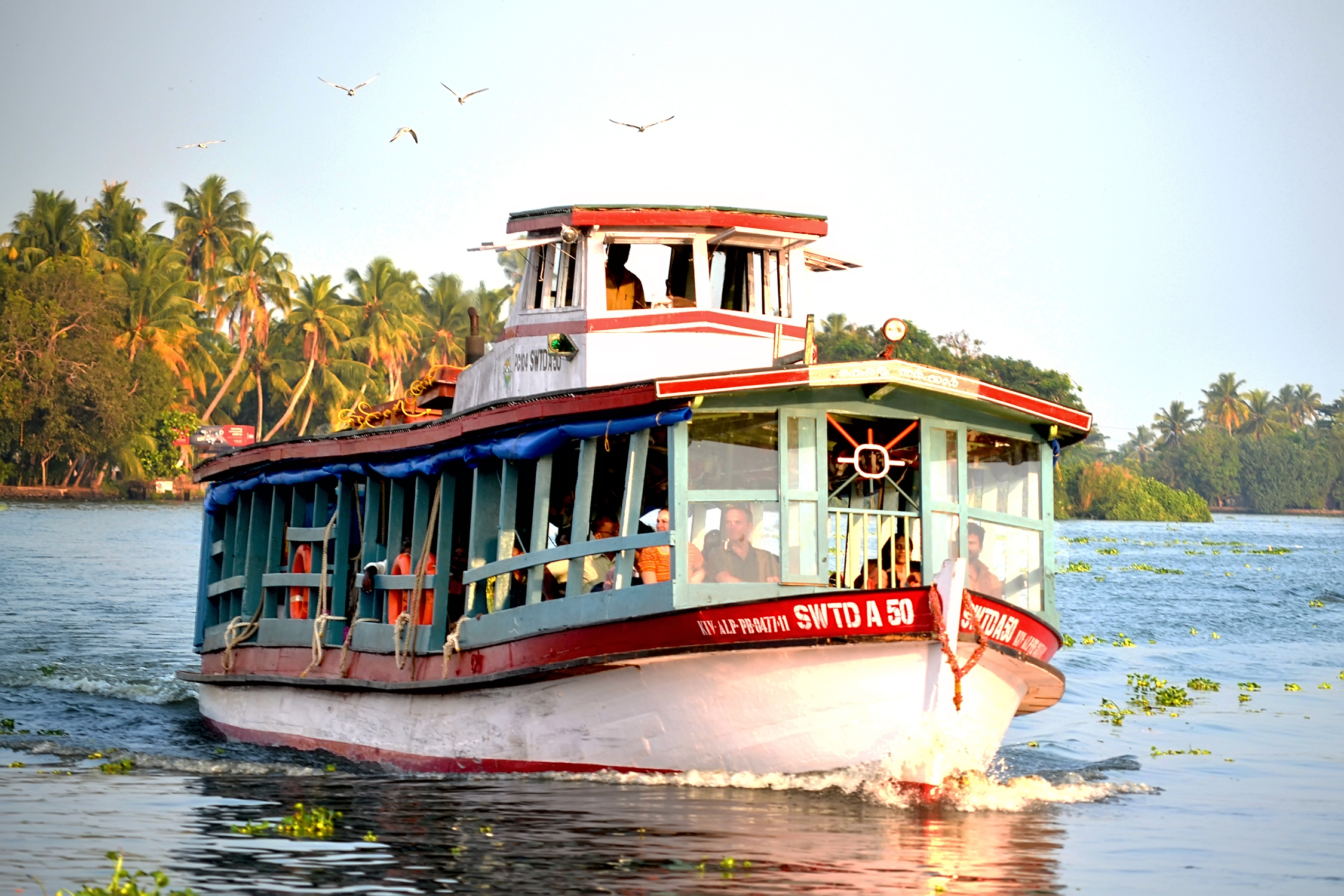
Public transport boat service in Kerala

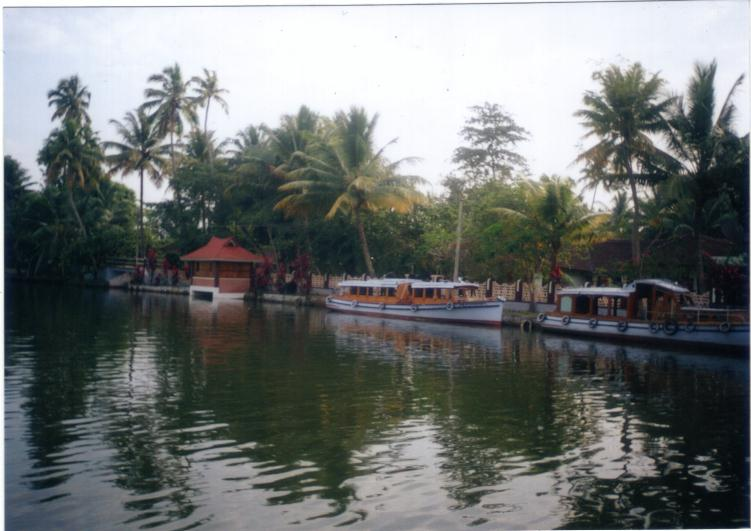
Kerala Backwaters

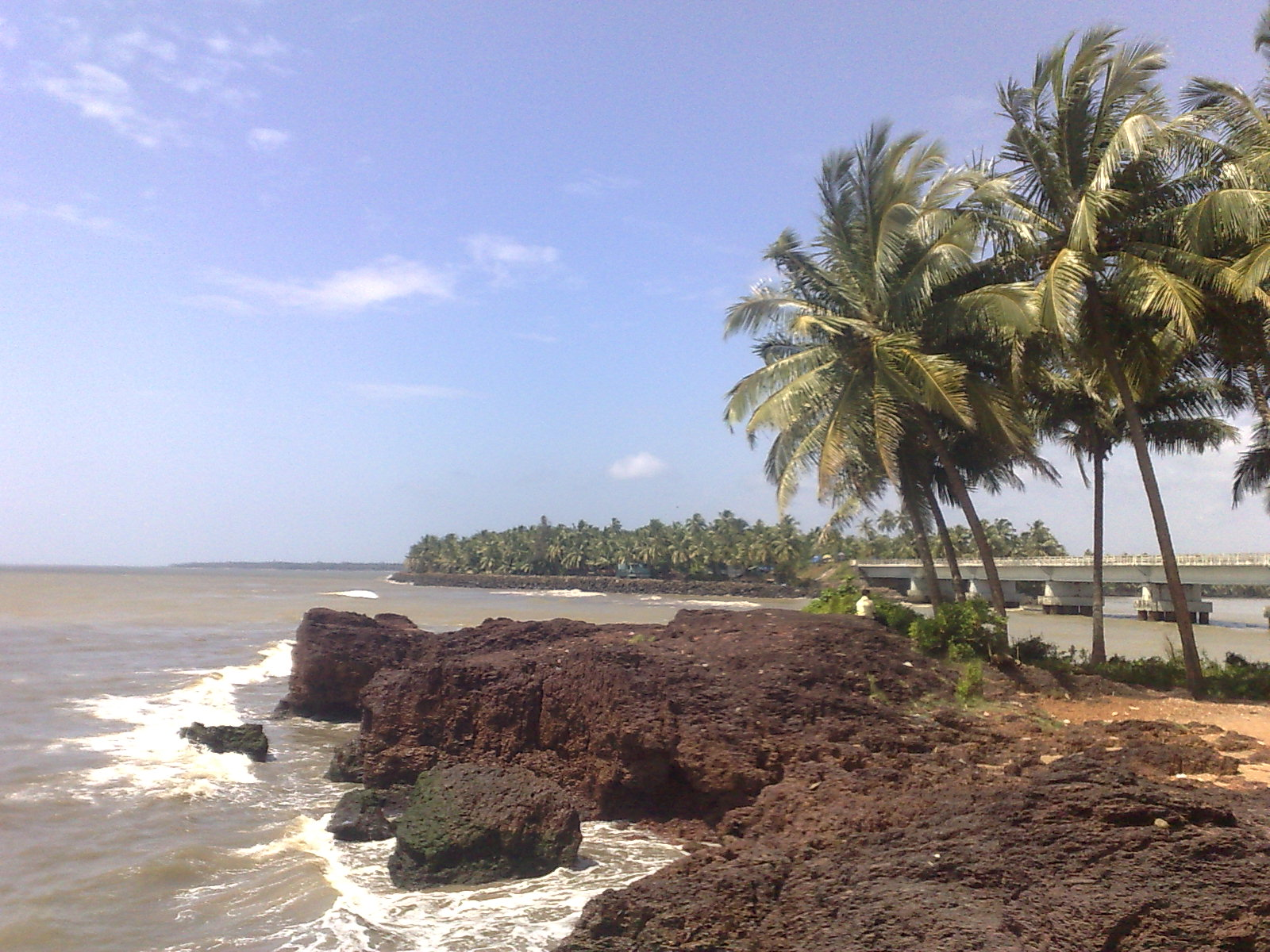
Estuary in Kadalundi-Vallikkunnu border

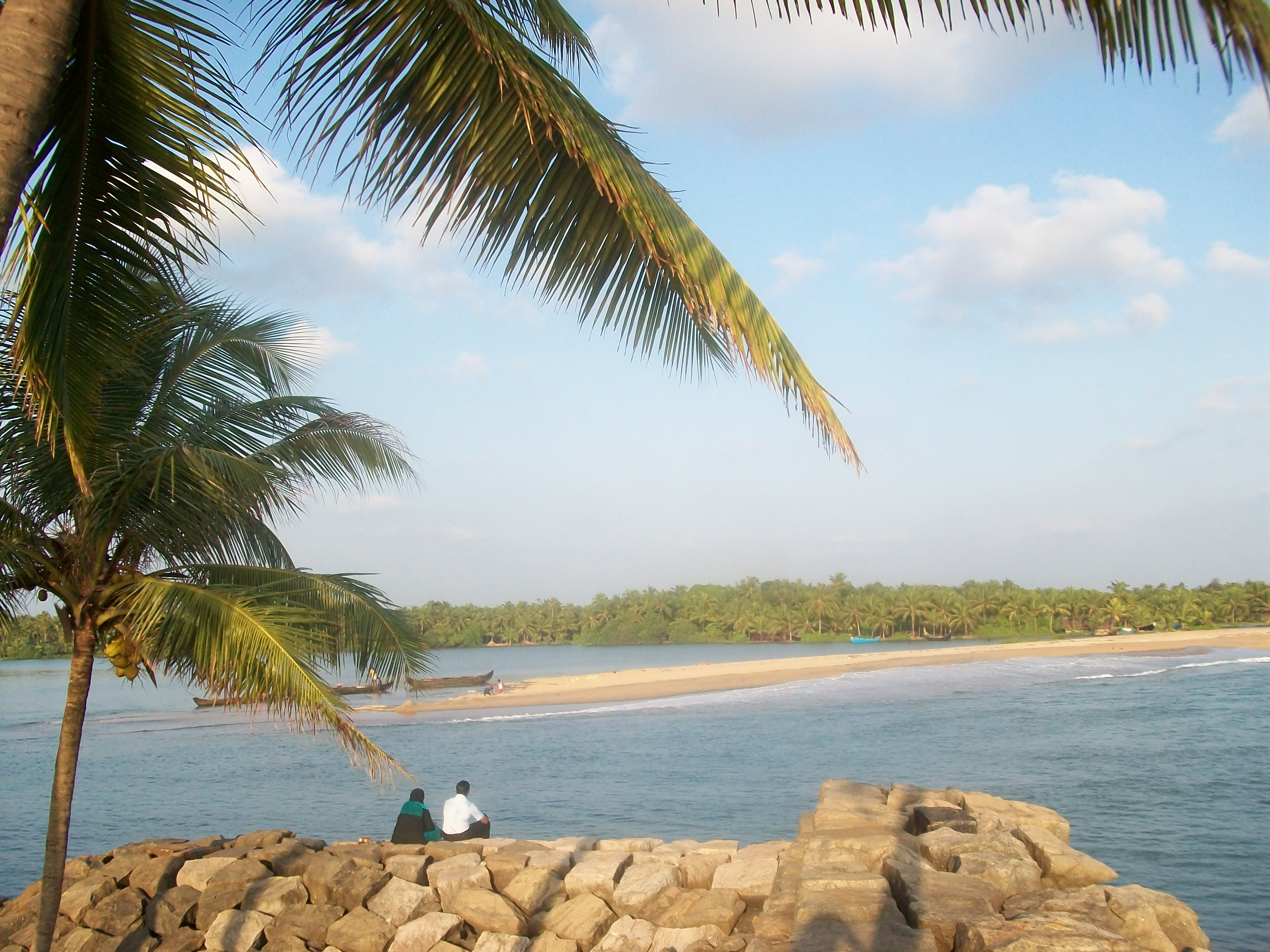
Puthuponnani promontory

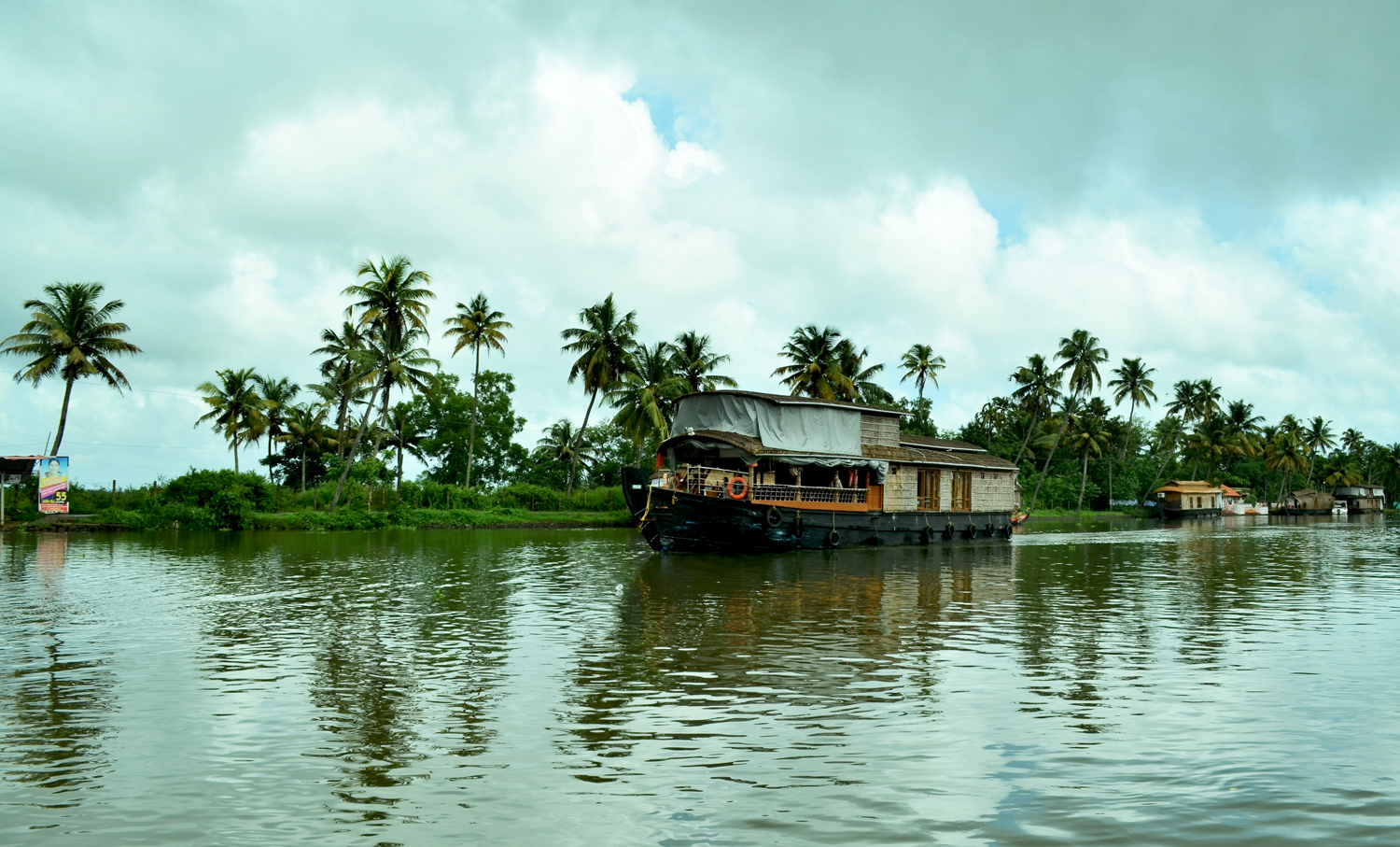
Houseboats on Kerala water-ways

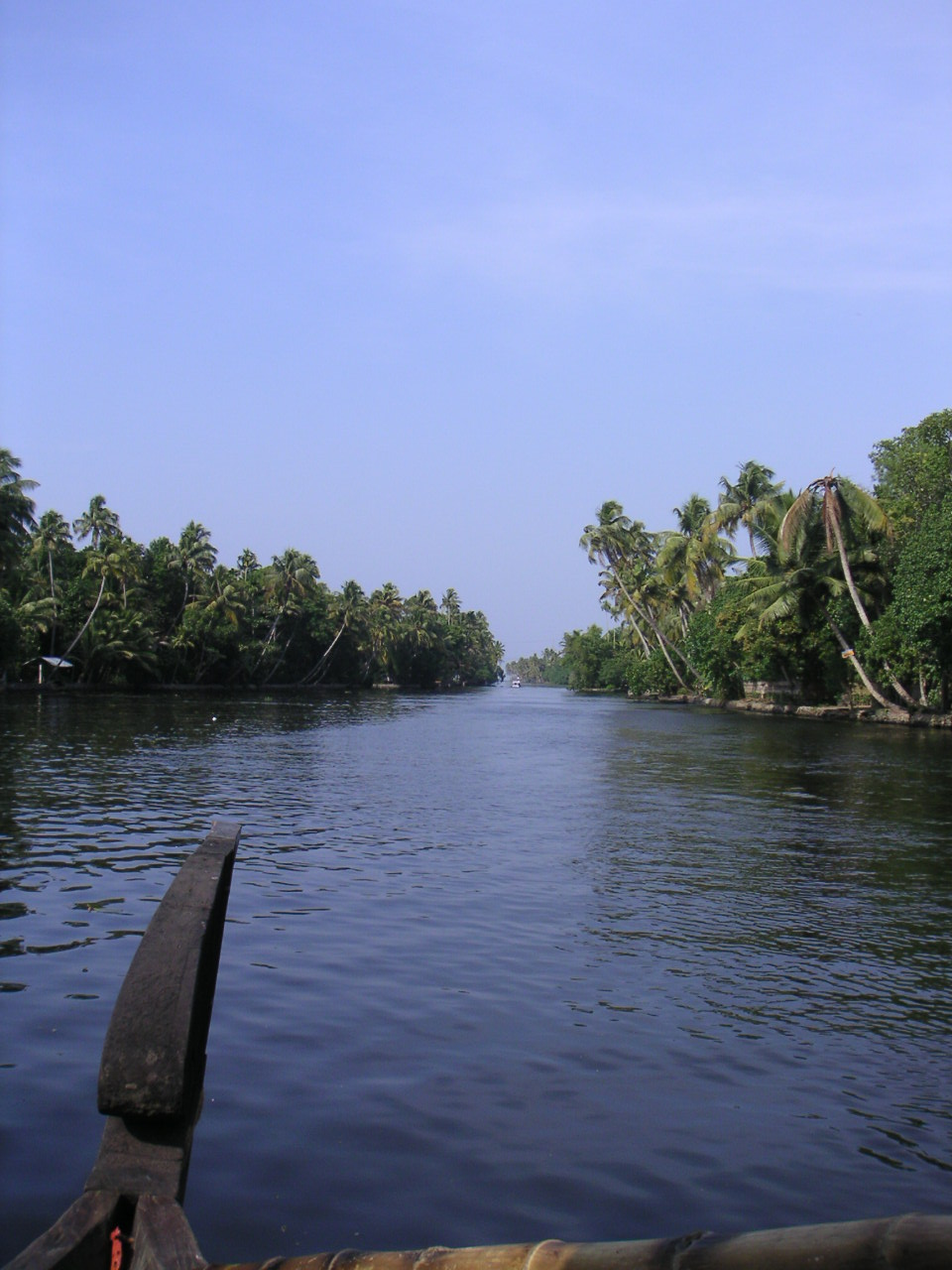
Kerala Backwaters

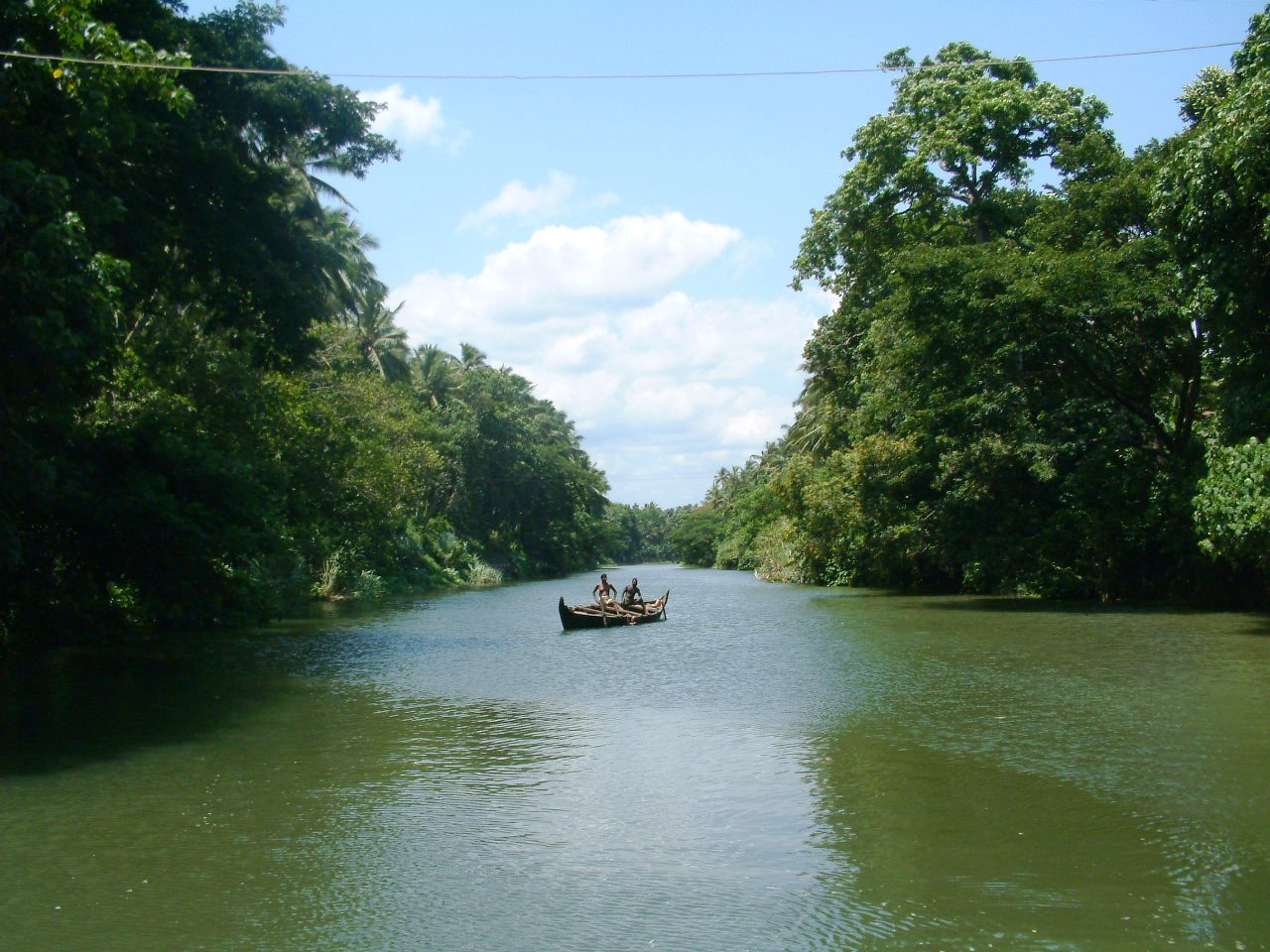
Lagoon at Veli - Akkulam stretch, Trivandrum

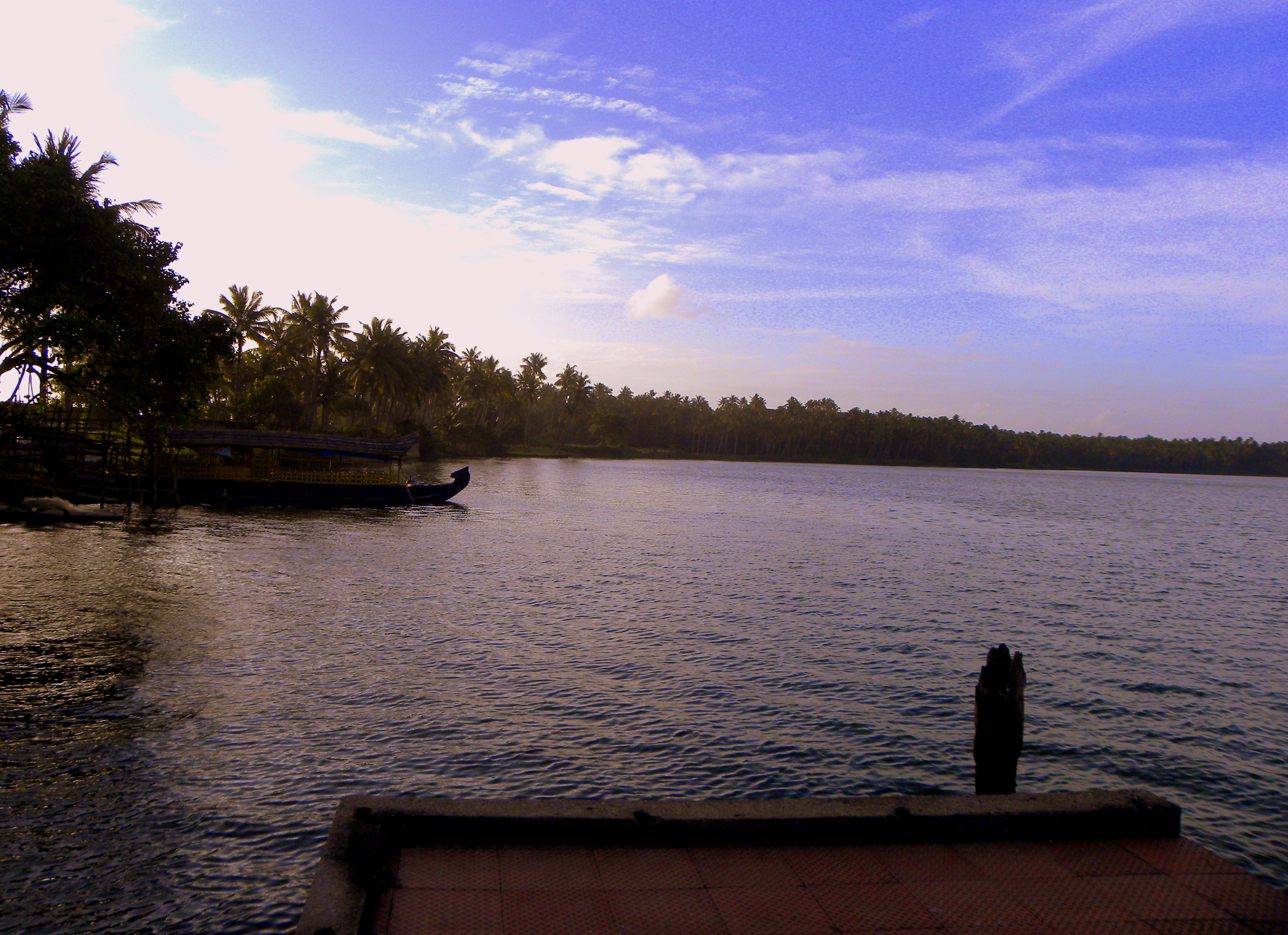
An evening view of Paravur Lake, City of Kollam

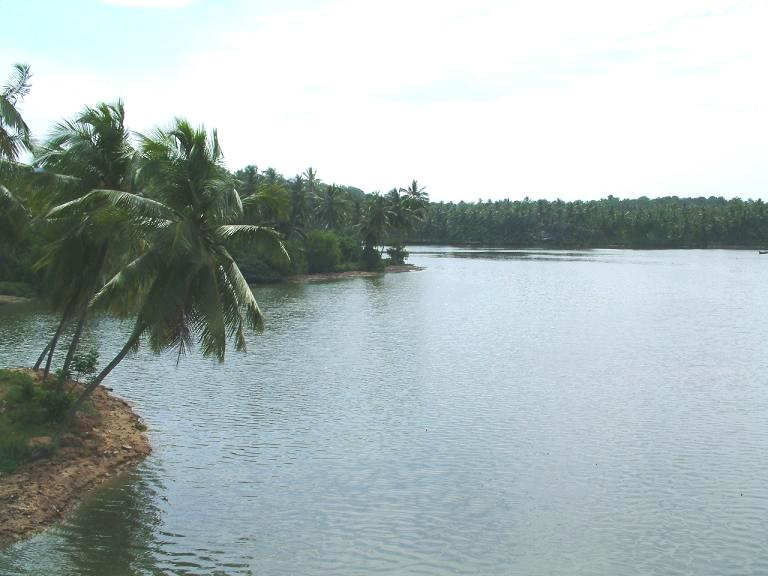
Veli Lake and Backwaters, Trivandrum

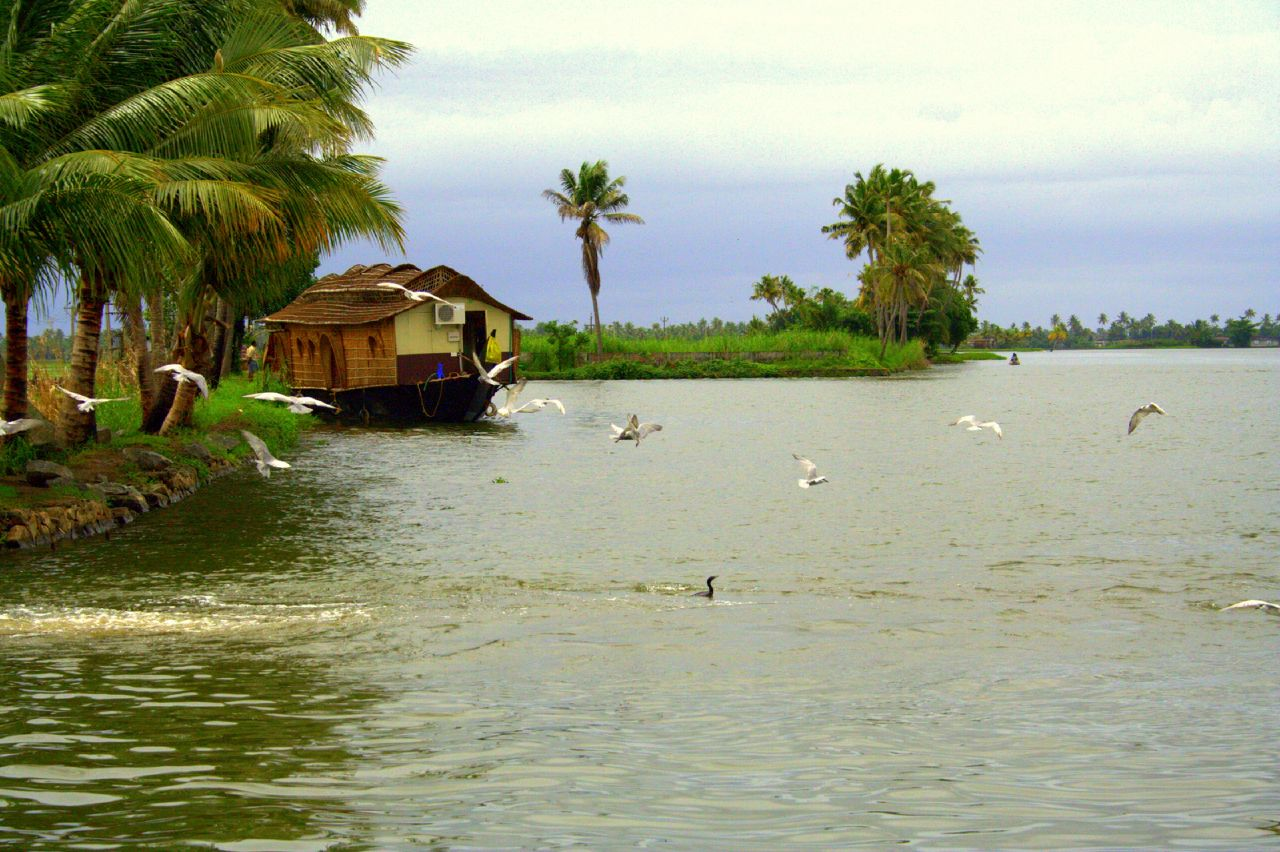
Backwater in Ashamudi Lake

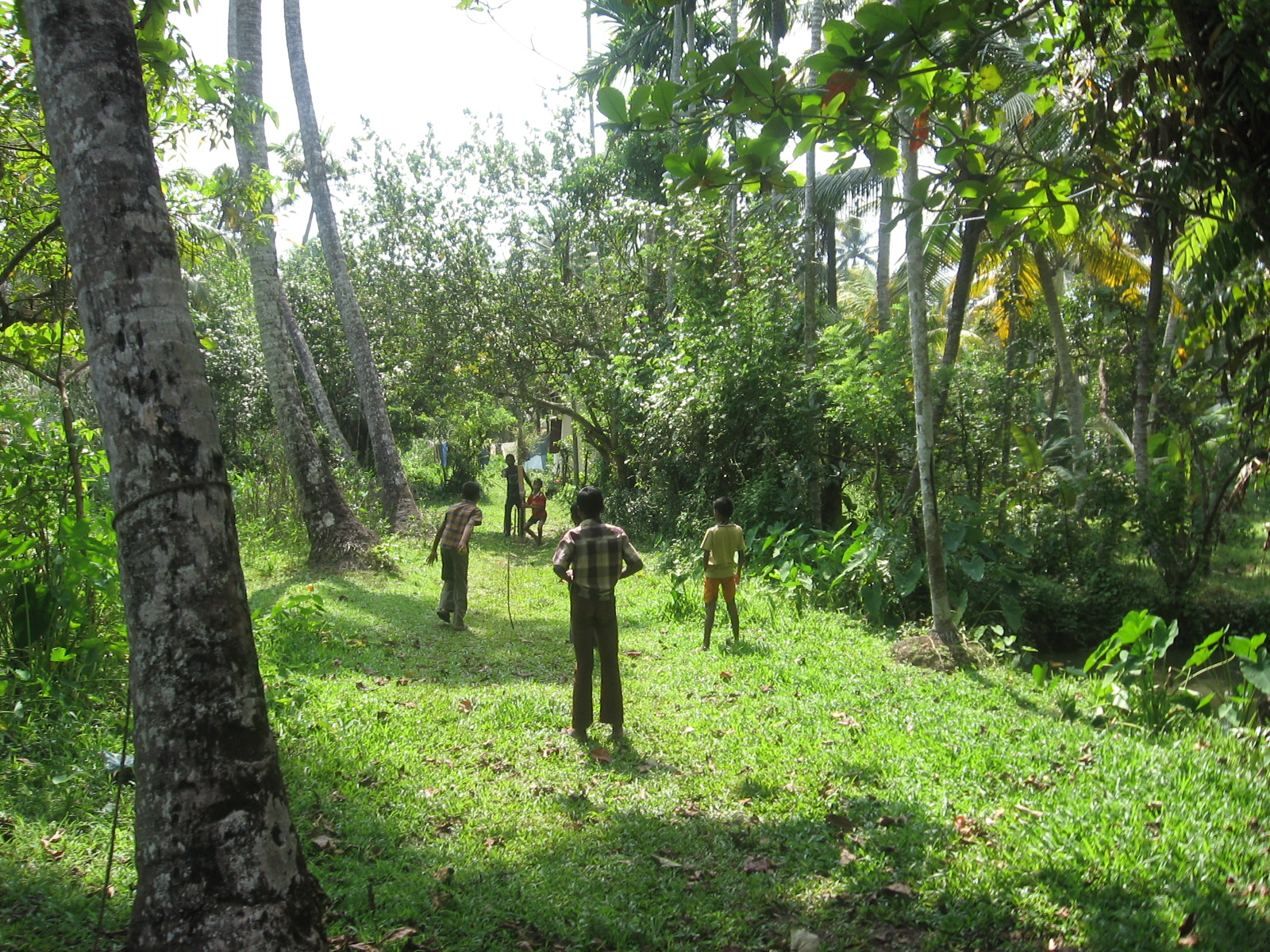
Children play cricket in a narrow stretch along the backwaters

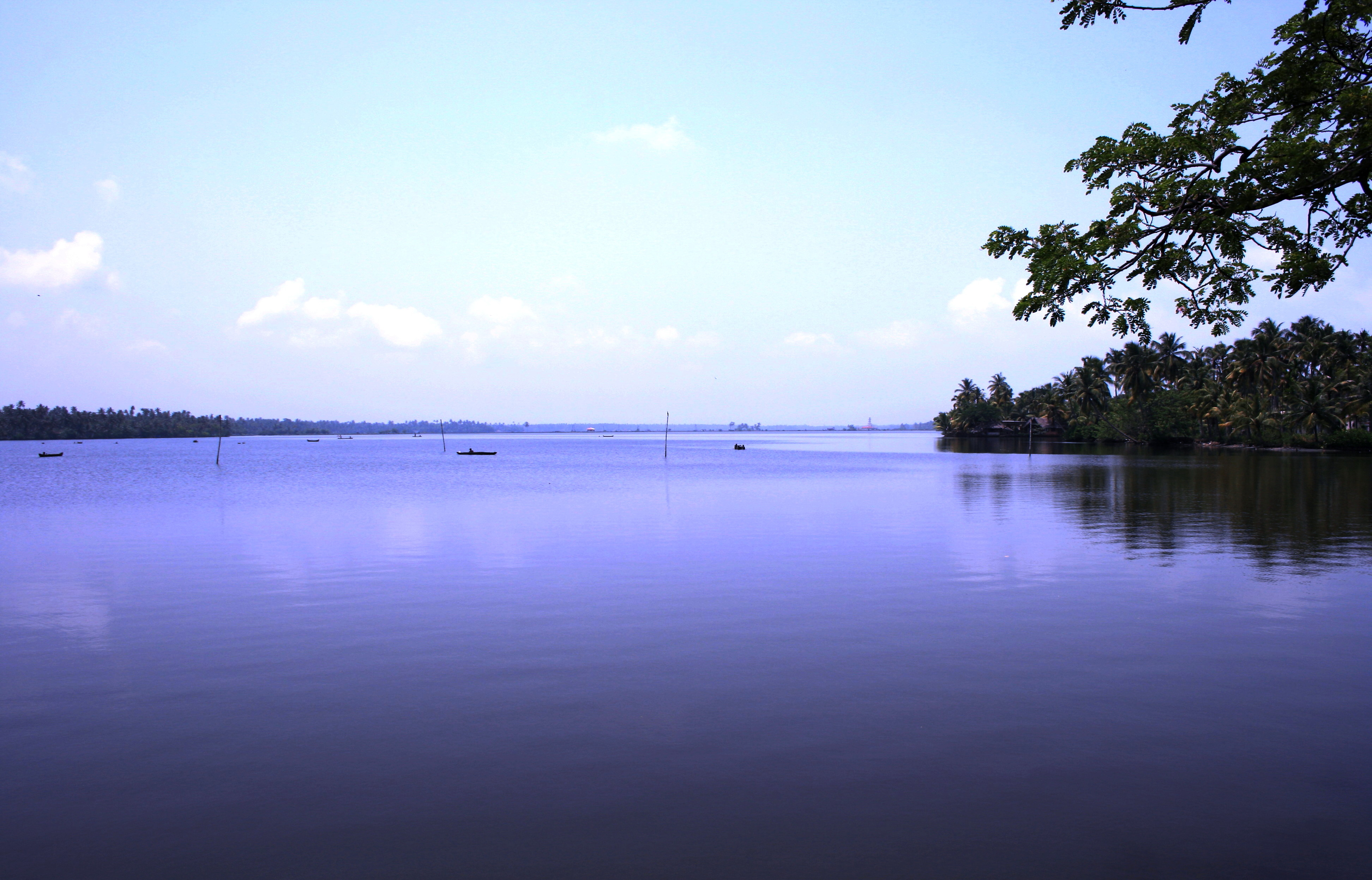
Lagoon near the Cherai Beach in Ernakulam

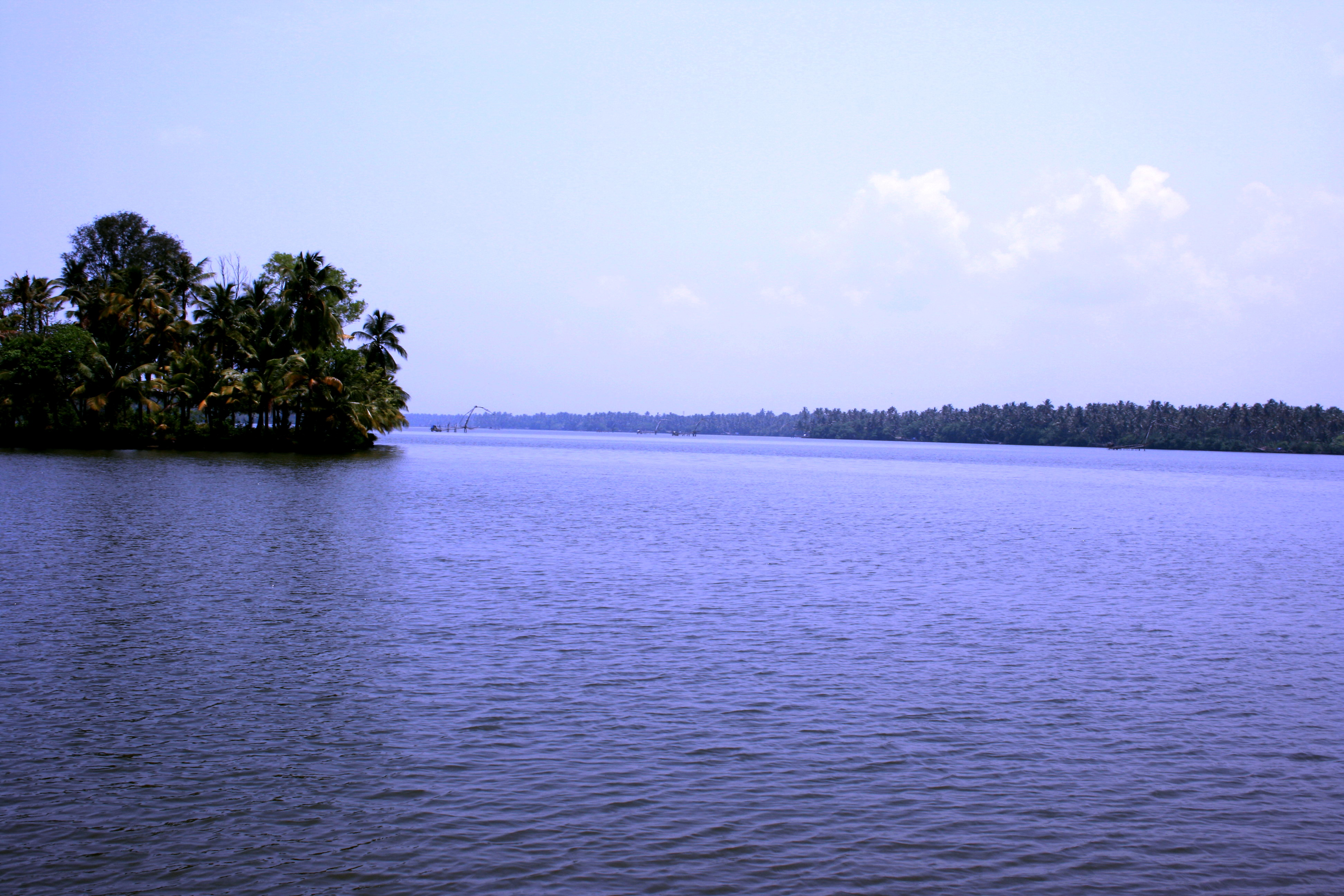
Lagoon near the Cherai Beach in Ernakulam

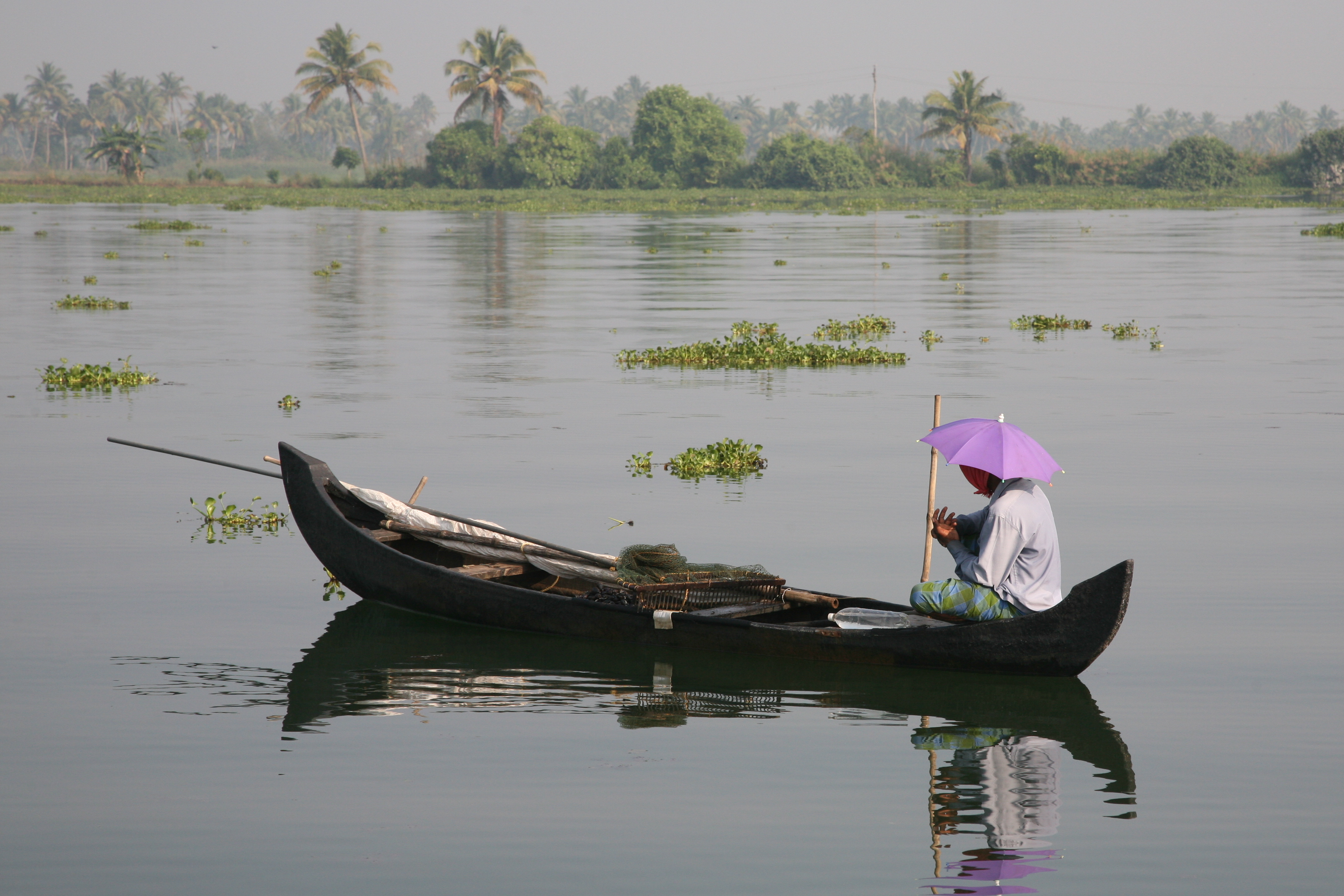
A boat in a canal near Vembanad lake

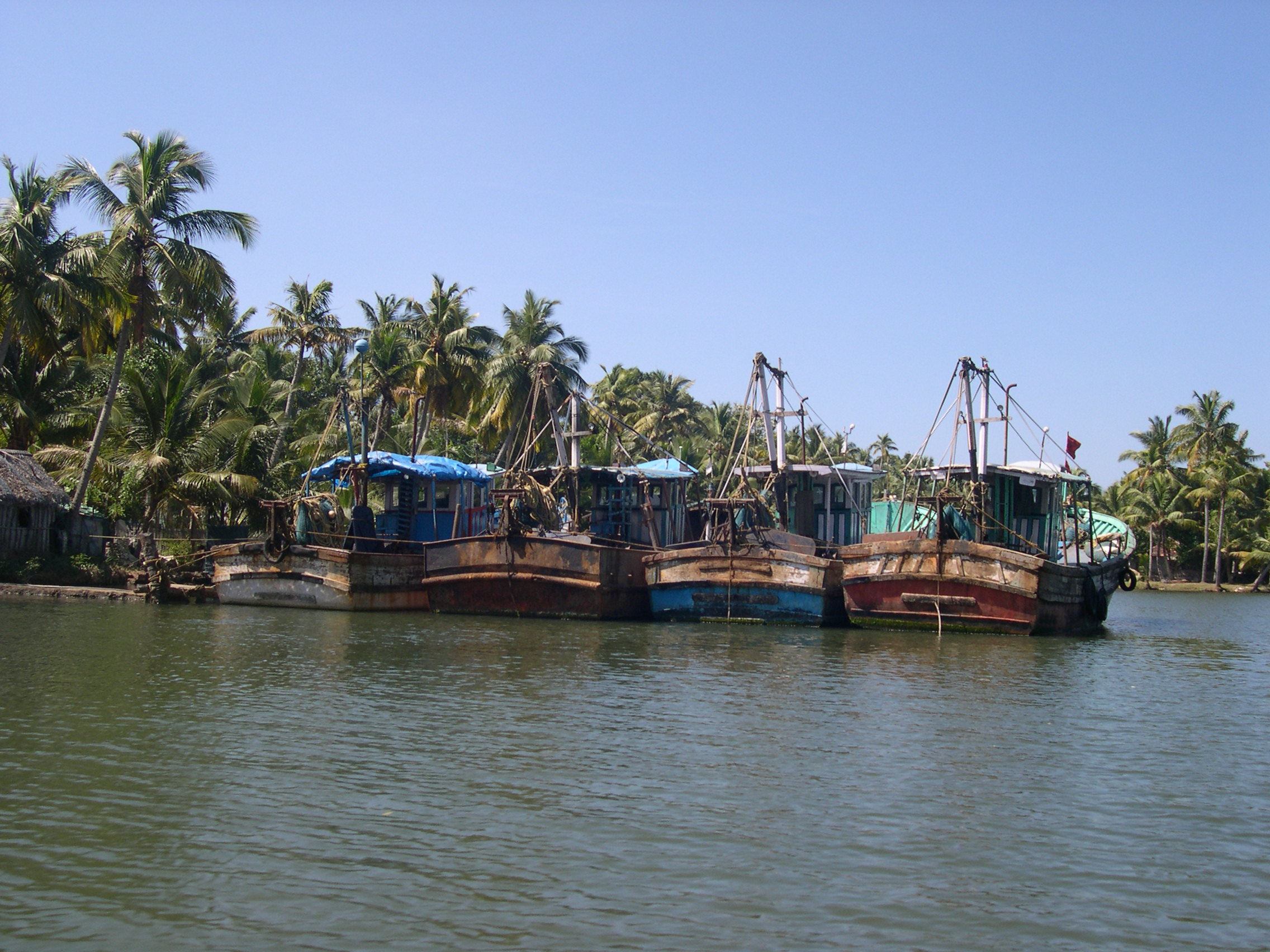
Boats

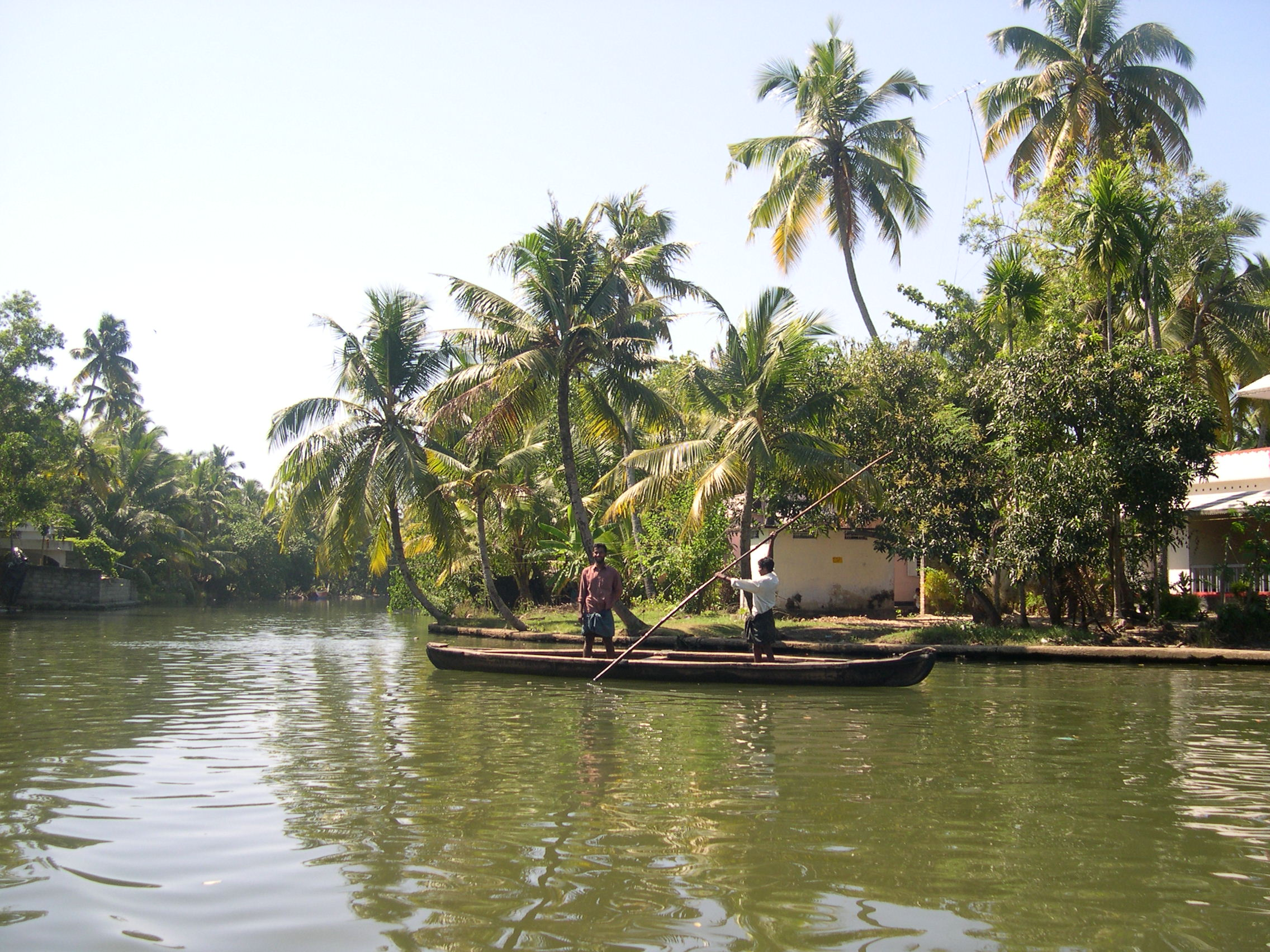
Local villagers

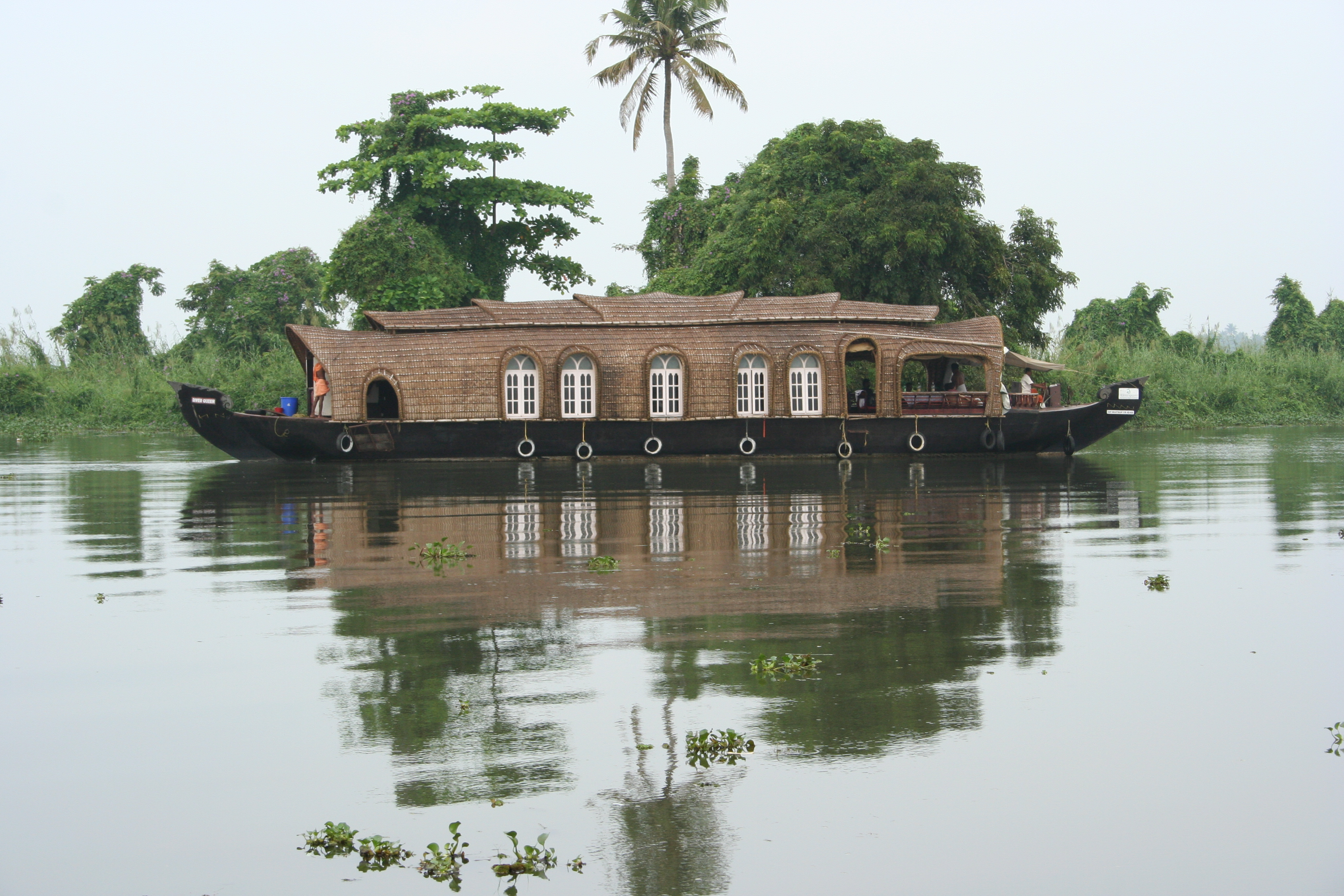
A Houseboat in Backwaters of Kerala

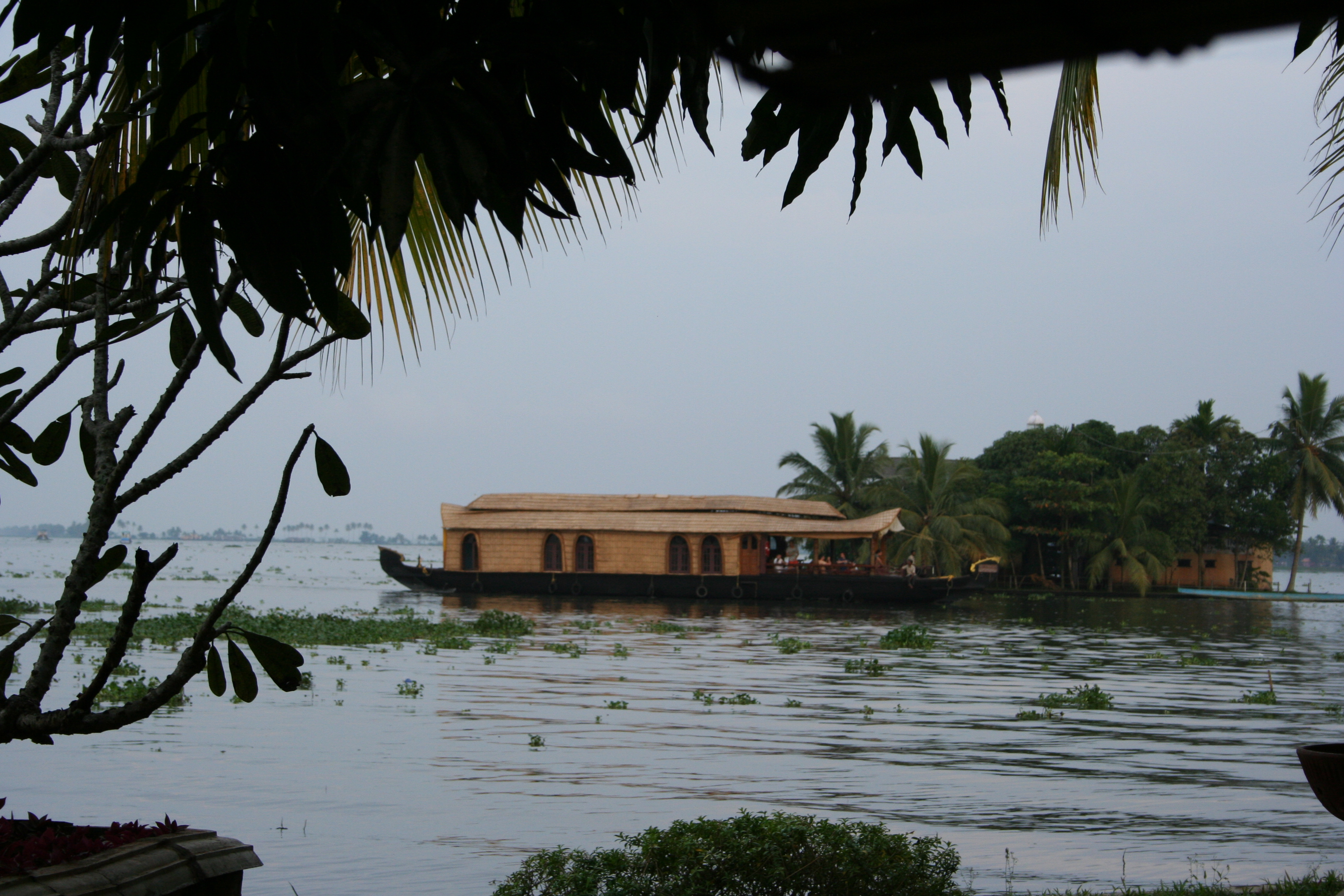
A Houseboat In Kerala Backwaters

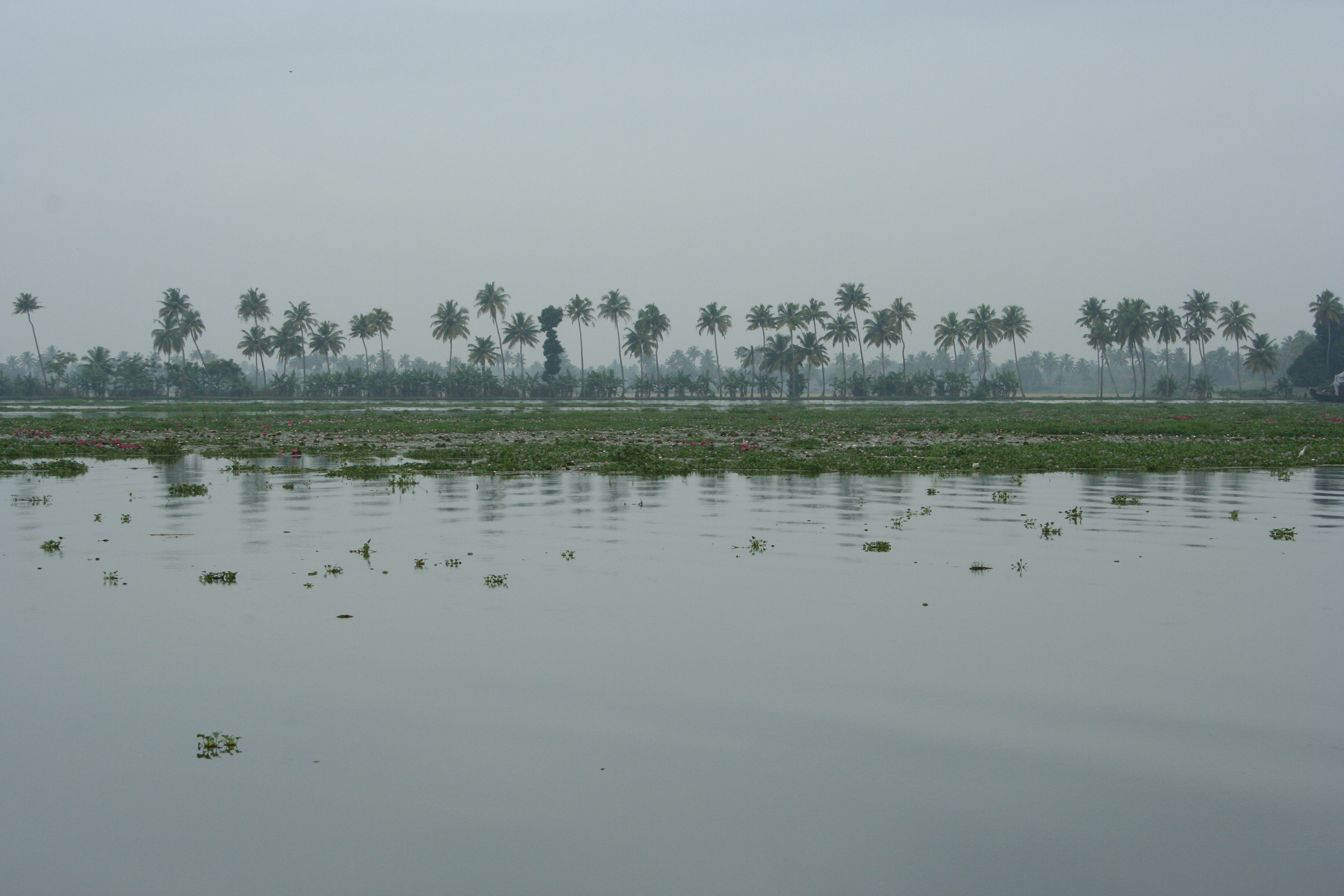
Kerala Backwaters at Dawn

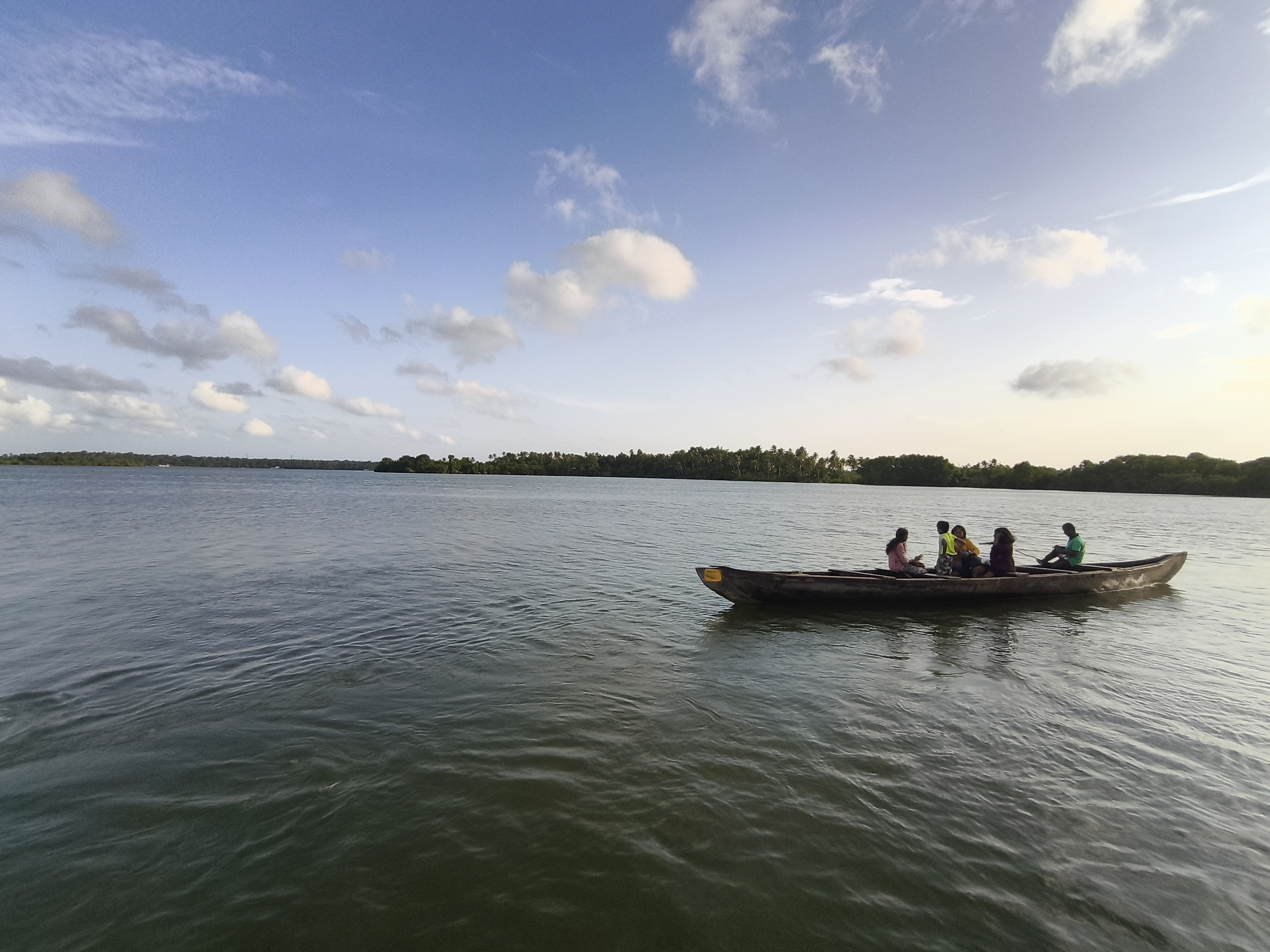
Boat Service in Munroe Island

== See also ==
- List of dams and reservoirs in Kerala
- List of mountains in Kerala
- List of rivers of Kerala

== Notes ==
- Chandran, VP (2018). Mathrubhumi Yearbook Plus - 2019 (Malayalam ed.). Kozhikode: P. V. Chandran, Managing Editor, Mathrubhumi Printing & Publishing Company Limited, Kozhikode.
