= Malayalis =

Dravidian ethnic group

Malayāḷikal
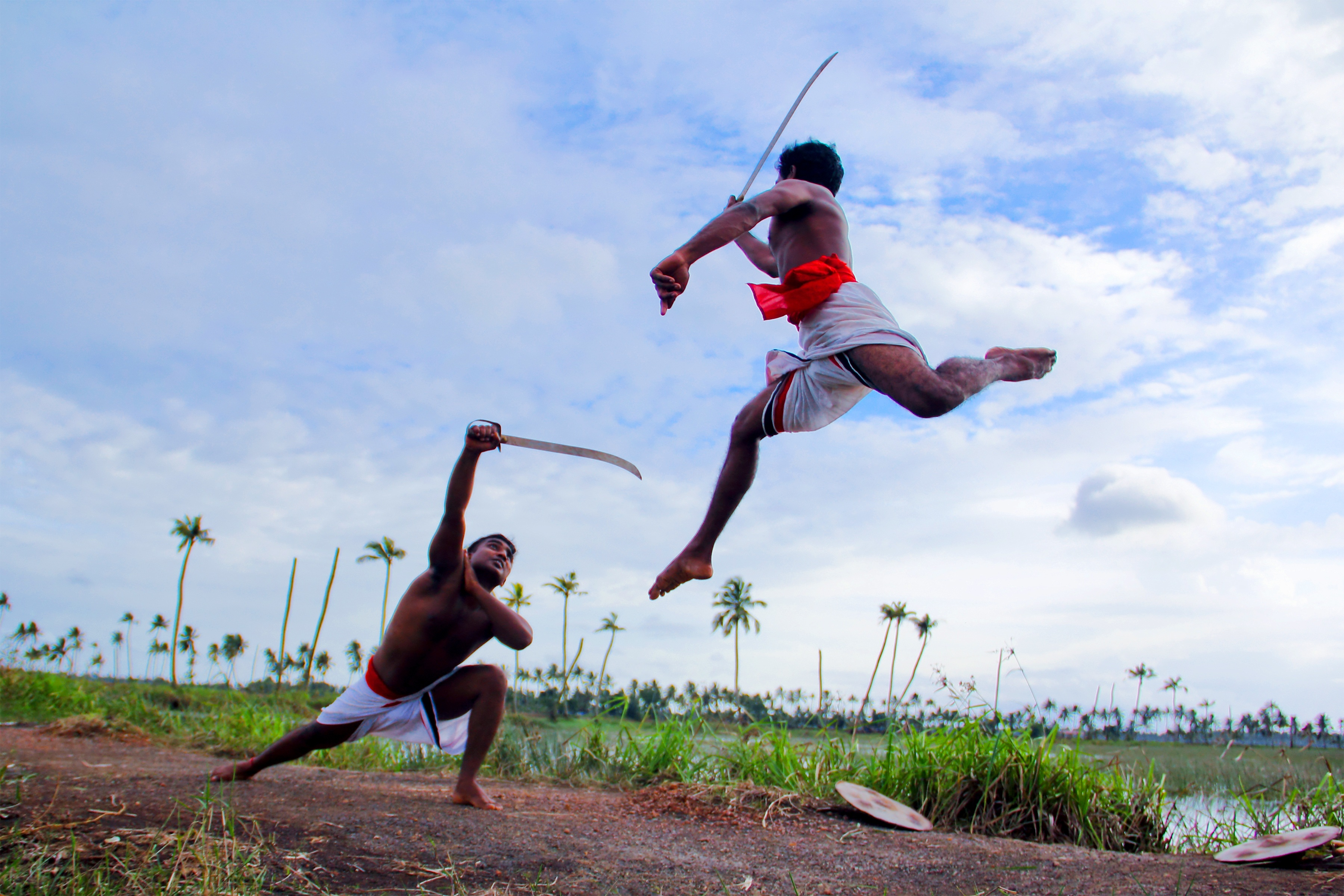
- Malayali men performing the Kerala native martial art, Kalaripayattu

Total population
- c. 40 million

Regions with significant populations
- India 34,838,819; Kerala 32,413,213; Lakshadweep 54,267; Rest of India 2,371,339
- Significant Malayali diaspora in
- United Arab Emirates: 1,014,000
- Qatar: 745,000
- Kuwait: 634,728
- Saudi Arabia: 595,000
- Malaysia: 369,000
- United States: 300,000
- Oman: 195,300
- Bahrain: 101,556
- Australia: 78,738
- Canada: 77,910
- United Kingdom: 45,264
- Germany: 25,000–45,000
- Singapore: 26,000
- Ireland: 24,674
- New Zealand: 14,604
- Pakistan: 6,000
- France: 5,000
- Switzerland: 5,000
- Indonesia: 4,000
- Poland: 7,122
- Austria: 3,785
- Finland: 633
- Japan: 500

Languages
- Malayalam

Religion
- Majority; Hinduism; Minority: Islam; Christianity (Indian Orthodox)

മലയാളം (Malayalam)
- Person: മലയാളി Malayāḷi
- People: മലയാളികൾ Malayāḷikaḷ
- Language: മലയാളം Malayāḷam
- Country: മലയാള രാജ്യം Malayāḷa Rājyam

The Malayalis (Malayalam: [mɐlɐjaːɭi]; also spelt Malayalees and sometimes known by the demonym Keralites) are a Dravidian ethnic group native to the southern Indian state of Kerala and the union territory of Lakshadweep. They are predominantly native speakers of the Malayalam language, one of the eleven classical languages of India. The state of Kerala was created in 1956 through the States Reorganisation Act. Prior to that, since the 1800s existed the Kingdom of Cochin, the Travancore, Malabar District, and South Canara of the British Raj. The Malabar District was annexed by the British Indians through the Third Mysore War (1790–92) from Tipu Sultan. Before that, the Malabar District was under various kingdoms including the Zamorins of Calicut, Kingdom of Tanur, Arakkal kingdom, Kolathunadu, Valluvanad and Palakkad Rajas.

According to the Indian census of 2011, there are approximately 33 million Malayalis in Kerala, making up 97% of the total population of the state. Malayali minorities are also found in the neighboring state of Tamil Nadu, mainly in Kanyakumari district and Nilgiri district and Dakshina Kannada and Kodagu districts of Karnataka and also in other metropolitan areas of India. Over the course of the later half of the 20th century, significant Malayali communities have emerged in Persian Gulf countries, including the United Arab Emirates, Bahrain, Saudi Arabia, Oman, Qatar and Kuwait and to a lesser extent, other developed nations with a primarily immigrant background such as Malaysia, Singapore, the United States, the United Kingdom, Australia, New Zealand and Canada. As of 2013, there were an estimated 1.6 million ethnic Malayali expatriates worldwide. The estimated population of Malayalees in Malaysia in year 2020 is approximately 348,000, which makes up 12.5% of the total number of Indian population in Malaysia that makes them the second biggest Indian ethnic group in Malaysia, after the Tamils. Most of the Malayalee population in Malaysia aged 18 to 30 are known to be either the third, fourth, or fifth generation living as a Malaysian citizen. According to A. R. Raja Raja Varma, Malayalam was the name of the place, before it became the name of the language spoken by the people.

== Etymology ==
Malayāḷi is derived from the Malayalam terms mala "mountain", āḷi "person/ruler". Another term used for Malayalis historically was Malabārī/Malabarese which comes from a combination of the Malyalam word mala (hill), the Persian/Arabic word barr (country/continent) and the suffix -ī "person". The words Malayali and Malabari are synonymous to each other. The Skanda Purana mentions the ecclesiastical office of the Thachudaya Kaimal who is referred to as Māṇikkam Kēraḷar (The Ruby King of Kerala), synonymous with the deity of the Koodalmanikyam temple.

== Geographic distribution and population ==
Malayalam is a language spoken by the native people of southwestern India (from Mangalore to Kanyakumari) and the islands of Lakshadweep in Arabian Sea. According to the Indian census of 2001, there were 30,803,747 speakers of Malayalam in Kerala, making up 93.2% of the total number of Malayalam speakers in India, and 96.7% of the total population of the state. There were a further 701,673 (2.1% of the total number) in Tamil Nadu, 557,705 (1.7%) in Karnataka and 406,358 (1.2%) in Maharashtra. The number of Malayalam speakers in Lakshadweep is 51,100, which is only 0.15% of the total number, but is as much as about 84% of the population of Lakshadweep. In all, Malayalis made up 3.22% of the total Indian population in 2001. Of the total 33,066,392 Malayalam speakers in India in 2001, 33,015,420 spoke the standard dialects, 19,643 spoke the Yerava dialect and 31,329 spoke non-standard regional variations like Eranadan. As per the 1991 census data, 28.85% of all Malayalam speakers in India spoke a second language and 19.64% of the total knew three or more languages. Malayalam was the most spoken language in erstwhile Gudalur taluk (now Gudalur and Panthalur taluks) of Nilgiris district in Tamil Nadu which accounts for 48.8% population and it was the second most spoken language in Mangalore and Puttur taluks of South Canara accounting for 21.2% and 15.4% respectively according to 1951 census report. 25.57% of the total population in the Kodagu district of Karnataka are Malayalis, in which Malayalis form the largest linguistic group in Virajpet Taluk. Around one-third of the Malayalis in Kodagu district speak the Yerava dialect according to the 2011 census, which is native to Kodagu and Wayanad. Around one-third of population in Kanyakumari district are also Malayalis. As of 2011 India census, Mahé district of Union Territory of Puducherry had a population of 41,816, predominantly Malayalis.

Just before independence, Malaya attracted many Malayalis. Large numbers of Malayalis have settled in Chennai (Madras), Delhi, Bangalore, Mangalore, Coimbatore, Hyderabad, Mumbai (Bombay), Ahmedabad and Chandigarh. Many Malayalis have also emigrated to the Middle East, the United States, Canada, Australia, New Zealand and Europe. As of 2009–2013, there were approximately 146,000 people with Malayali heritage in the United States, with an estimated 40,000 living in the New York tri-state area. There were 7,093 Malayalam speakers in Australia in 2006. The 2001 Canadian census reported 7,070 people who listed Malayalam as their mother tongue, mostly in the Greater Toronto Area and Southern Ontario. In 2010, the Census of Population of Singapore reported that there were 26,348 Malayalees in Singapore. The 2006 New Zealand census reported 2,139 speakers. 134 Malayalam speaking households were reported in 1956 in Fiji. There is also a considerable Malayali population in the Persian Gulf regions, especially in Bahrain, Oman, Qatar, UAE, Kuwait and European region mainly in London. The city of Chennai has the highest population of Malayalis in a metropolitan area outside Kerala, followed by Bangalore.

Malayalee citizens in Malaysia are estimated to be 229,800 in the year 2020 whereas the population of the Malayalee expatriates is approximately 2,000. They make up around 10 percent of the total number of Indians in Malaysia.

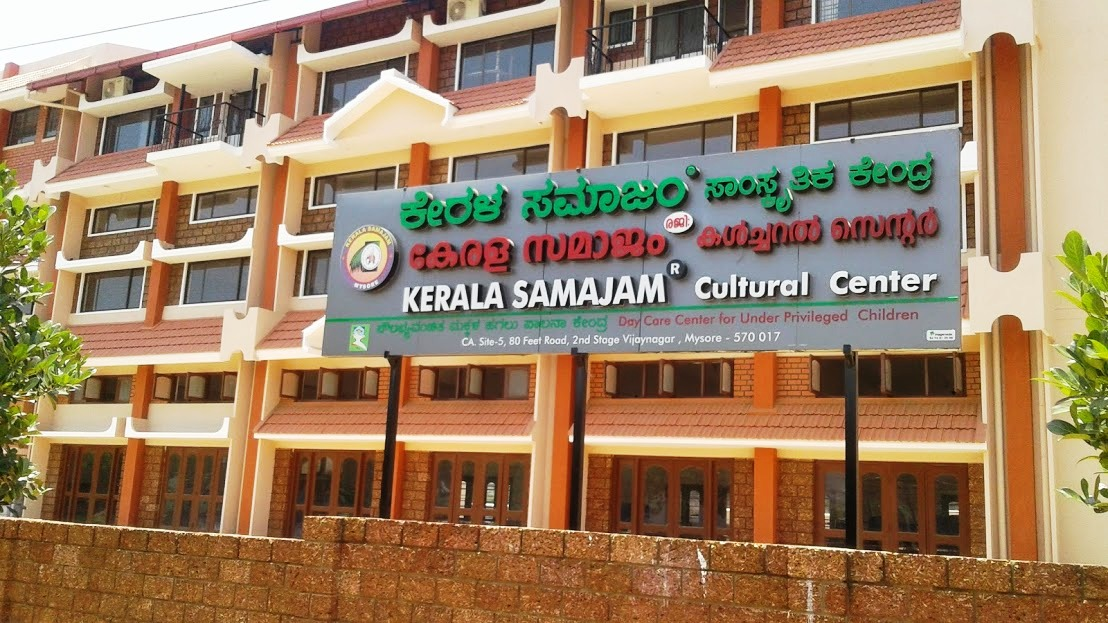
Kerala Samajam, Mysore

== History and culture ==
During the ancient period, the people of present-day Kerala were ruled by the Chera dynasty of Tamilakam, with their capital at Vanchi.

The Malayalis live in a historic area known as the Malabar coast, which for thousands of years has been a major center of the international spice trade, operating at least from the Roman era with Ptolemy documenting it on his map of the world in 150 AD. For that reason, a highly distinct culture was created among the Malayali due to centuries of contact with foreign cultures through the spice trade. The arrival of the Cochin Jews, the rise of Saint Thomas Christians, and the growth of Mappila Muslim community, in particular, were very significant in shaping modern-day Malayali culture. Later, Portuguese Latin Christians, Dutch Malabar, French Mahe, and British English, which arrived after 1498 left their mark through colonialism and pillaging their resources.

In 2017, a detailed study of the evolution of the Singapore Malayalee community over a period of more than 100 years was published as a book: From Kerala to Singapore: Voices of the Singapore Malayalee Community. It is believed to be the first in-depth study of the presence of a NRI Malayalee community outside of Kerala.

=== Language and literature ===
The word Malayāḷalipi (Meaning: Malayalam script) written in the Malayalam script

Although disputed, the widely held view consider the Malayalam language to be descended from a dialect of early middle Tamil language spoken on the Malabar coast, and largely arose because of its geographical isolation from the rest of the Tamil speaking areas, though the spoken dialect likely also preserved certain archaisms suggesting that spoken dialects already started diverging to an extent in the prehistoric period itself. The Sangam literature can be considered as the ancient predecessor of Malayalam. Malayalam literature is ancient in origin, and includes such figures as the 14th century Niranam poets (Madhava Panikkar, Sankara Panikkar and Rama Panikkar), whose works mark the dawn of both modern Malayalam language and indigenous Keralite poetry. Some linguists claim that an inscription found from Edakkal Caves, Wayanad, which belongs to 3rd century CE (approximately 1,800 years old), is the oldest available inscription in Malayalam, as they contain two modern Malayalam words, Ee (This) and Pazhama (Old), those are not found in literary Tamil. Although this has been disputed by scholars who regard it as a regional dialect of Old Tamil. The use of the pronoun ī and the lack of the literary Tamil -ai ending are archaisms from Proto-Dravidian rather than unique innovations of Malayalam. (Note: "*aH and *iH are demonstrative adjectives reconstructed for Proto-Dravidian, as they show variation in vowel length. When they occur in isolation they occur as ā, and ī but when they are followed by a consonant initial word then they appear as a- and i- as in Ta. appoẓutu 'that time'., : Te. appuḍu id. and Ta. ippoẓutu 'that time'., : Te.ippuḍu id. However, Modern Tamil has replaced ā, and ī with anda and inda but most Dravidian languages have preserved it.") The origin of Malayalam calendar dates back to year 825 CE. It is generally agreed that the Quilon Syrian copper plates of 849/850 CE is the available oldest inscription written in Old Malayalam. For the first 600 years of Malayalam calendar, the literature mainly consisted of the oral ballads such as Vadakkan Pattukal (Northern Songs) in North Malabar and Thekkan Pattukal (Southern songs) in Southern Travancore. The earliest known literary works in Malayalam are Ramacharitam and Thirunizhalmala, two epic poems written in Old Malayalam. Malayalam literature has been presented with 6 Jnanapith awards, the second-most for any Dravidian language and the third-highest for any Indian language.

Designated a "Classical Language in India" in 2013, it developed into the current form mainly by the influence of the poets Cherusseri Namboothiri (born near Kannur), Thunchaththu Ezhuthachan (born near Tirur), and Poonthanam Nambudiri (Born near Perinthalmanna), in the 15th and the 16th centuries CE. Kunchan Nambiar, a Palakkad-based poet also influenced a lot in the growth of modern Malayalam literature in its pre-mature form, through a new literary branch called Thullal. The prose literature, criticism, and Malayalam journalism, began following the latter half of 18th century CE. The first travelogue in any Indian language is the Malayalam Varthamanappusthakam, written by Paremmakkal Thoma Kathanar in 1785.

The triumvirate of poets (Kavithrayam: Kumaran Asan, Vallathol Narayana Menon and Ulloor S. Parameswara Iyer) are recognized for moving Keralite poetry away from archaic sophistry and metaphysics and towards a more lyrical mode. In the 19th century Kuriakose Elias Chavara, the founder of the Carmelites of Mary Immaculate and the Congregation of Mother of Carmel congregations, contributed to different streams in the Malayalam Literature. All his works are written between 1829 and 1870. Chavara's contribution to Malayalam literature includes chronicles, poems – athmanuthapam (compunction of the soul), Maranaveettil Paduvanulla Pana (Poem to sing in the bereaved house) and Anasthasiayude Rakthasakshyam – and other literary works. Contemporary Malayalam literature deals with social, political, and economic life context. The tendency of the modern poetry is often towards political radicalism. The writers like Kavalam Narayana Panicker have contributed much to Malayalam drama. In the second half of the 20th century, Jnanpith winning poets and writers like G. Sankara Kurup, S. K. Pottekkatt, Thakazhi Sivasankara Pillai, M. T. Vasudevan Nair, O. N. V. Kurup, and Akkitham Achuthan Namboothiri, had made valuable contributions to the modern Malayalam literature. Later, writers like O. V. Vijayan, Kamaladas, M. Mukundan, Arundhati Roy, and Vaikom Muhammed Basheer, have gained international recognition.

Arabi Malayalam (also called Mappila Malayalam and Moplah Malayalam) was the traditional Dravidian language of the Mappila Muslim community in Malabar Coast. The poets like Moyinkutty Vaidyar and Pulikkottil Hyder have made notable contributions to the Mappila songs, which is a genre of the Arabi Malayalam literature. The Arabi Malayalam script, otherwise known as the Ponnani script, is a writing system – a variant form of the Arabic script with special orthographic features – which was developed during the early medieval period and used to write Arabi Malayalam until the early 20th century CE. Though the script originated and developed in Kerala, today it is predominantly used in Malaysia and Singapore by the migrant Muslim community.

Suriyani Malayalam, also known as Karshoni, Syro-Malabarica or Syriac Malayalam, is a dialect of Malayalam written in a variant form of the Syriac alphabet which was popular among the Saint Thomas Christians (also known as Syrian Christians or Nasranis) of Kerala in India. It uses Malayalam grammar, the Maḏnḥāyā or "Eastern" Syriac script with special orthographic features, and vocabulary from Malayalam and East Syriac. This originated in the South Indian region of the Malabar Coast (modern-day Kerala). Until the 19th century, the script was widely used by Syrian Christians in Kerala.Vedatharkam written by Kariattil Mar Ousep is one of the famous books written in Suriyani Malayalam. Large number of documents written in Suriyani Malayalam are found among the Saint Thomas Christians or Nasranis of Kerala. These documents include an alternate set of the Canons of the Synod of Diamper. At present the dialect is not in popular usage. However it survives in historical literature of the Saint Thomas Christian denominations. Thomas Koonammakkal is one of the most notable experts in Garshuni Malayalam studies.

The modern Malayalam grammar is based on the book Kerala Panineeyam written by A. R. Raja Raja Varma in late 19th century CE. World Malayali Council with its sister organisation, International Institute for Scientific and Academic Collaboration (IISAC) has come out with a comprehensive book on Kerala titled Introduction to Kerala Studies, specially intended for the Malayali diaspora across the globe. J.V. Vilanilam, former Vice-Chancellor of the University of Kerala; Sunny Luke, medical scientist and former professor of Medical Biotechnology at Adelphi University, New York; and Antony Palackal, professor of sociology at the Loyola College of Social Sciences in Thiruvananthapuram, have edited the book, besides making other contributions to it.

=== Tharavadu ===
Tharavad, also spelled as Tharavadu is the ancestral home of aristocratic families in Kerala, which usually served as the common house for the matrilineal joint family system practiced in the state. Each Tharavadu has a unique name. The Tharavadu was administered by the Karanavar, the oldest male member of the family. He would be the eldest maternal uncle of the family as well. The members of the Tharavadu consisted of mother, daughters, sons, sisters and brothers. The fathers and husbands had a very minimal role to play in the affairs of the Tharavadu. It was a true matrilineal affair. The Karanavar took all major decisions. He was usually autocratic. However, the consent of the eldest female member of the family was taken before implementing the decisions. This eldest female member would be his maternal grandmother, own mother, mother's sister, his own sister or a sister through his maternal lineage. Since the lineage was through the female members, the birth of a daughter was always welcomed. Each Tharavadu also has a Para Devatha (clan deity) revered by those in the particular Tharavadu. Temples were built to honour these deities.

Certain Hindu communities such as the Nairs, Muslims around Kannur, Some parts of Kozhikode district and Ponnani in Malappuram, and Varkala and Edava in Thiruvananthapuram used to follow a traditional matrilineal system known as marumakkathayam which has in the recent years (post-Indian independence) ceased to exist.

=== Architecture ===
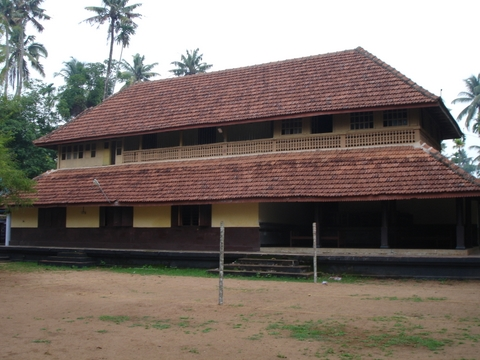
A typical Nalukettu structure.

Kerala, the ancestral land of the Malayali people, has a tropical climate with excessive rains and intensive solar radiation. The architecture of this region has evolved to meet these climatic conditions by having the form of buildings with low walls, sloping roof and projecting caves. The setting of the building in the open garden plot was again necessitated by the requirement of wind for giving comfort in the humid climate.

Timber is the prime structural material abundantly available in many varieties in Kerala. Perhaps the skillful choice of timber, accurate joinery, artful assembly, and delicate carving of the woodwork for columns, walls and roofs frames are the unique characteristics of Malayali architecture. From the limitations of the materials, a mixed-mode of construction was evolved in Malayali architecture. The stonework was restricted to the plinth even in important buildings such as temples. Laterite was used for walls. The roof structure in timber was covered with palm leaf thatching for most buildings and rarely with tiles for palaces or temples. The 'Kerala murals' are paintings with vegetable dyes on wet walls in subdued shades of brown. The indigenous adoption of the available raw materials and their transformation as enduring media for architectural expression thus became the dominant feature of the Malayali style of architecture.

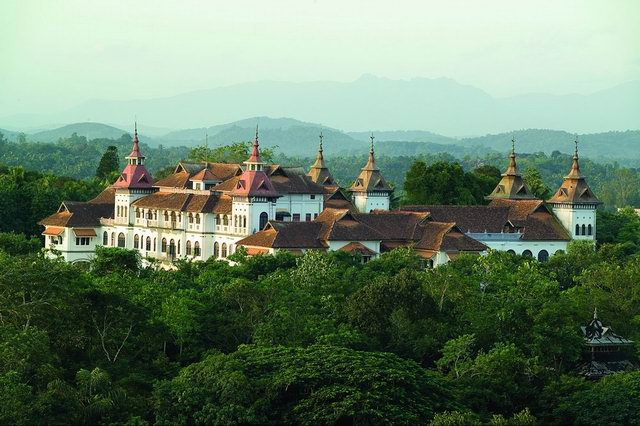
The Kowdiar Palace, the palace of the Maharajah of Travancore, was built with a traditional Malayali architecture style with a slight influence of early modern European elements

==== Nalukettu ====
Nalukettu was a housing style in Kerala. Nalukettu is a quadrangular building constructed after following the Tachu Sastra (Science of Carpentry). It was a typical house that was flanked by out-houses and utility structures. The large house-Nalukettu is constructed within a large compound. It was called Nalukettu because it consisted of four wings around a central courtyard called Nadumuttom. The house has a quadrangle in the center. The quadrangle is in every way the center of life in the house and very useful for the performance of rituals. The layout of these homes was simple, and catered to the dwelling of numerous people, usually part of a tharavadu. Ettukettu (eight halls with two central courtyards) or Pathinarukettu (sixteen halls with four central courtyards) are the more elaborate forms of the same architecture.

An example of a Nalukettu structure is Mattancherry Palace.

=== Performing arts and music ===
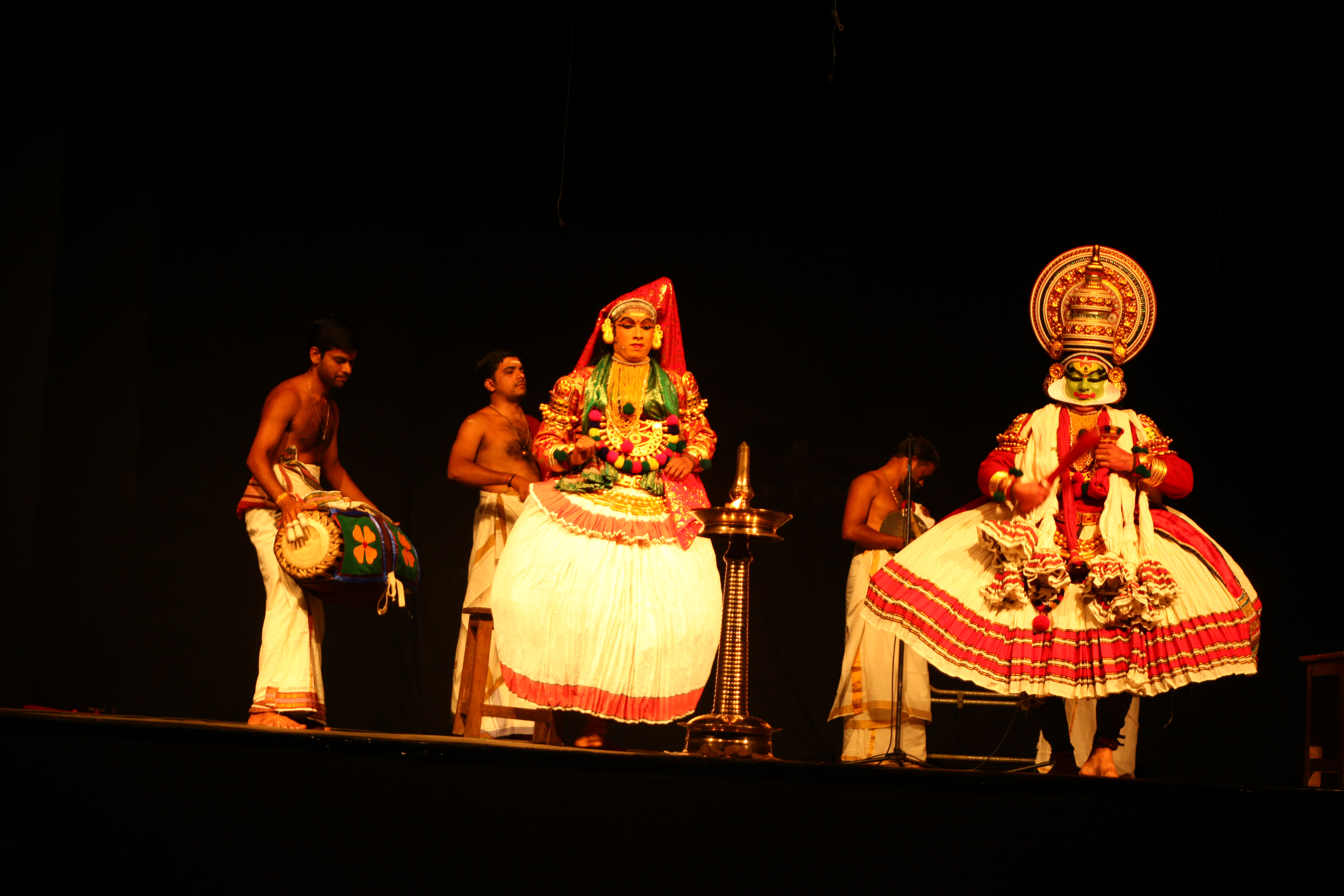
Kathakali

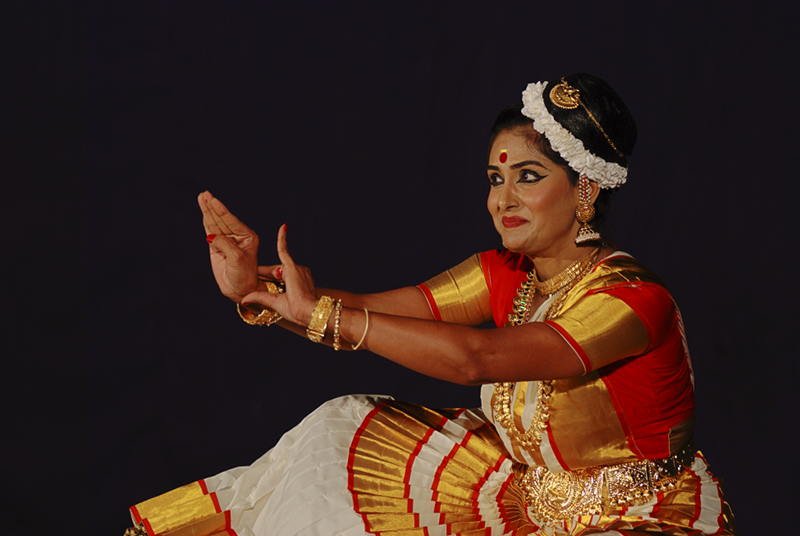
Mohiniyattam

Margamkali performed during a Syro-Malabar Nasrani wedding.

Malayalis use two words to denote dance, which is attom and thullal. The art forms of Malayalis are classified into three types: religious, such as Theyyam and Bhagavatipattu; semi religious, like Sanghakali and Krishnanattom; and secular, such as Kathakali, Mohiniyattam, and Thullal. Kathakali and Mohiniyattam are the two classical dance forms from Kerala. Kathakali is actually a dance-drama. Mohiniyattam is a very sensual and graceful dance form that is performed both solo and in a group by women. Kutiyattam is a traditional performing art form from Kerala, which is recognised by UNESCO and given the status Masterpieces of Oral and Intangible Heritage of Humanity. Ottamthullal is another performing art, which is also known as the poor man's Kathakali, which was created by the poet Kunchan Nambiar as an alternative to Chakiarkooth (another performing art), which was open only for higher castes to see. Theyyam is a ritualistic art form of Malayalis, which is thought to predate Hinduism and to have developed from folk dances performed in conjunction with harvest celebrations. Theyyam is performed as an offering to gods so as to get rid of poverty and illness. Velakali is another ritualistic art form, mainly performed at temples in the festival time. Kolkali is a folk art in which dance performers move in a circle, striking small sticks and keeping rhythm with special steps.

Many ancient Malayali family houses in Kerala have special snake shrines called Kavu. Sarpam Thullal is usually performed in the courtyard of houses having snake shrines. This is a votive offering for family wealth and happiness. Kerala Natanam (കേരള നടനം) (Kerala dance) is a new style of dance that is now recognized as a distinct classical art form evolved from Kathakali. The Indian dancer Guru Gopinath (ഗുരു ഗോപിനാഥ്‌) a well-trained Kathakali artist and his wife Thankamani Gopinath developed this unique form of dance.

Performing arts in Kerala is not limited to a single religion of the Malayali society. Muslim Mappilas, Nasranis Mappilas and Latin Christians have their own unique performing art forms. Duff Muttu, also known as Dubh Muttu/Aravanamuttu is a performing art form prevalent among the Muslim community. It is a group performance, staged as a social event during festivals and nuptial ceremonies.

Oppana is a popular form of social entertainment among the Muslim community.

Margamkali is a performing art which is popular among the Nasrani Mappilas. It combines both devotion and entertainment, and was performed by men in groups. Since the 1980s women also have found groups. The dancers themselves sing the margamkali songs in unison call and response form. Parichamuttukali is another performing art which is popular among Nasranis. This is an artistic adaptation of the martial art of Kerala, Kalaripayattu. Chavittu nadakom is a theatrical art form observed mainly by Kerala Latin Christians, dating back to the second half of the 16th century.

However, many of these native art forms largely play to tourists or at youth festivals, and are not as popular among ordinary Keralites. Thus, more contemporary forms – including those heavily based on the use of often risqué and politically incorrect mimicry and parody – have gained considerable mass appeal in recent years. Indeed, contemporary artists often use such modes to mock socioeconomic elites. Since 1930 when the first Malayalam film Vigathakumaran was released and over the following decade or two, Malayalam Cinema had grown to become one of the popular means of expression for both works of fiction and social issues, and it remains so.

Music formed a major part of early Malayalam literature, which is believed to have started developing by 9th century CE. The significance of music in the culture of Kerala can be established just by the fact that in Malayalam language, musical poetry was developed long before prose. Kerala is musically known for Sopanam. Sopanam is religious in nature, and developed through singing invocatory songs at the Kalam of Kali, and later inside temples. Sopanam came to prominence in the wake of the increasing popularity of Jayadeva's Gita Govinda or Ashtapadis. Sopana sangeetham (music), as the very name suggests, is sung by the side of the holy steps (sopanam) leading to the sanctum sanctorum of a shrine. It is sung, typically employing plain notes, to the accompaniment of the small, hourglass-shaped ethnic drum called idakka, besides the chengila or the handy metallic gong to sound the beats.

Sopanam is traditionally sung by men of the Maarar and Pothuval community, who are Ambalavasi (semi-Brahmin) castes engaged to do it as their hereditary profession. Kerala is also home of Carnatic music. Swati Tirunal, Shadkala Govinda Maarar, Sangitha Vidwan Gopala Pillai Bhagavathar, Chertala Gopalan Nair, M. D. Ramanathan, T.V.Gopalakrishnan, M.S. Gopalakrishnan, L. Subramaniam T.N. Krishnan and K. J. Yesudas are Malayali musicians. Also among the younger generations with wide acclaim is violinist L. Athira Krishna etc.

Kerala also has a significant presence of Hindustani music as well. The king of Travancore, Swathi Thirunal patronaged and contributed much to the Hindustani music. The pulluvar of Kerala are closely connected to the serpent worship. One group among these people consider the snake gods as their presiding deity and performs certain sacrifices and sing songs. This is called Pulluvan Pattu. The song conducted by the pulluvar in serpent temples and snake groves is called Sarppapaattu, Naagam Paattu, Sarpam Thullal, Sarppolsavam, Paambum Thullal or Paambum Kalam. Mappila Paattukal or Mappila Songs are folklore Muslim devotional songs in the Malayalam language. Mappila songs are composed in colloquial Malayalam and are sung in a distinctive tune. They are composed in a mixture of Malayalam and Arabic.

Film music, which refers to playback singing in the context of Indian music, forms the most important canon of popular music in India. Film music of Kerala in particular is the most popular form of music in the state.

=== Vallam Kali ===
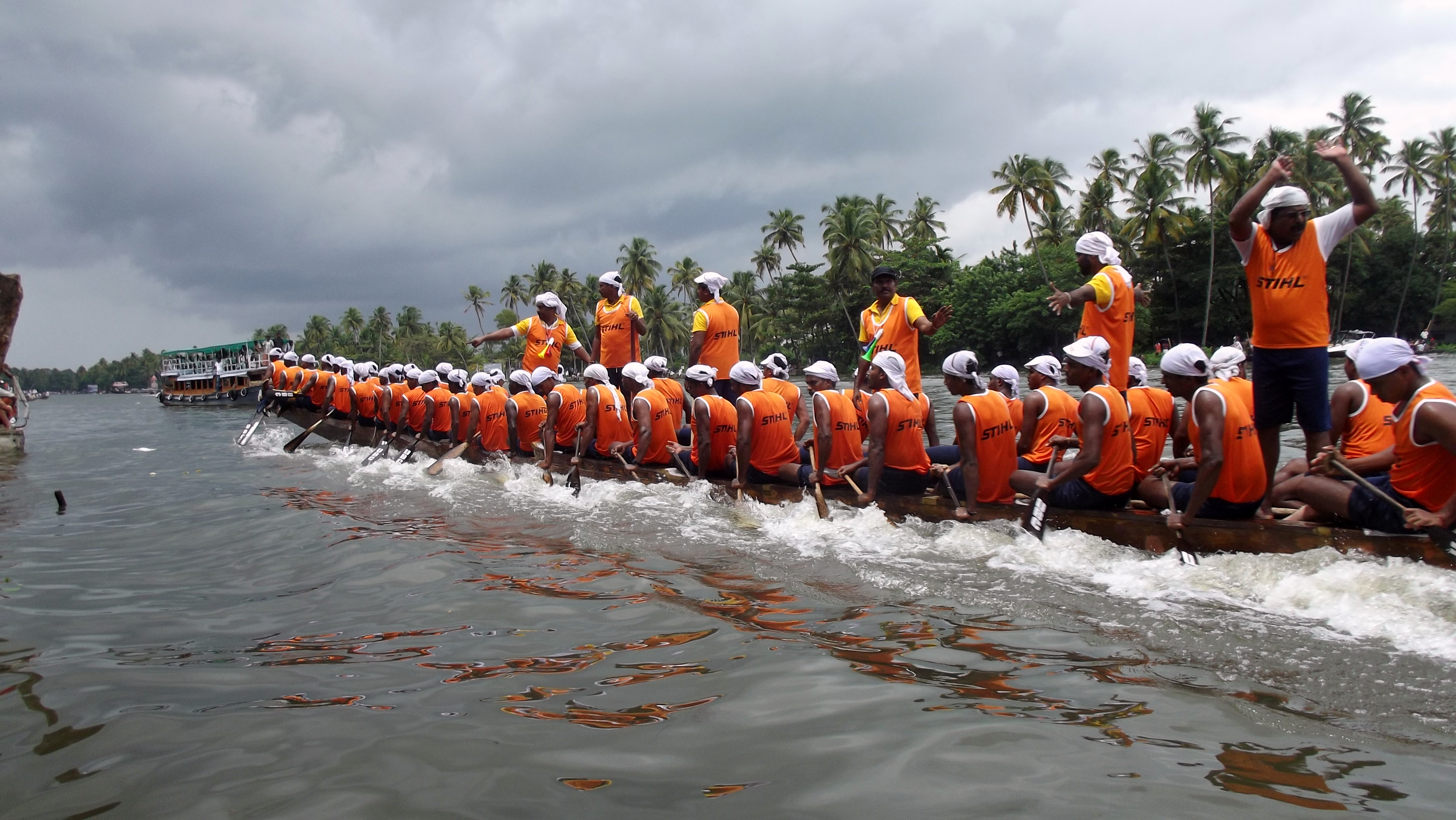
Vallamkali-Nehru Trophy Boat Race

Vallam Kali is the race of country-made boats. It is mainly conducted during the season of the harvest festival Onam in autumn. Vallam Kali include races of many kinds of traditional boats of Kerala. The race of Chundan Vallam (snake boat) is the major item. Hence Vallam Kali is also known in English as Snake Boat Race and a major tourist attraction. Other types of boats which do participate in various events in the race are Churulan Vallam, Iruttukuthy Vallam, Odi Vallam, Veppu Vallam (Vaipu Vallam), Vadakkanody Vallam, and Kochu Vallam. Nehru Trophy Boat Race is one of the famous Vallam Kali held in Punnamada Lake in Alappuzha district of Kerala. Champakulam Moolam Boat Race is the oldest and most popular Vallam Kali in Kerala. The race is held on river Pamba on the moolam day (according to the Malayalam Era) of the Malayalam month Midhunam, the day of the installation of the deity at the Ambalappuzha Sree Krishna Temple. The Aranmula Boat Race takes place at Aranmula, near a temple dedicated to Lord Krishna and Arjuna. The President's Trophy Boat Race is a popular event conducted in Ashtamudi Lake in Kollam.

Thousands of people gather on the banks of the river Pamba to watch the snake boat races. Nearly 50 snake boats or chundan vallams participate in the festival. Payippad Jalotsavam is a three-day water festival. It is conducted in Payippad Lake which is 35 km from Alappuzha district of Kerala state. There is a close relation between this Payippad boat race and Subramanya Swamy Temple in Haripad. Indira Gandhi Boat Race is a boat race festival celebrated in the last week of December in the backwaters of Kochi, a city in Kerala. This boat race is one of the most popular Vallam Kali in Kerala. This festival is conducted to promote Kerala tourism.

=== Festivals ===
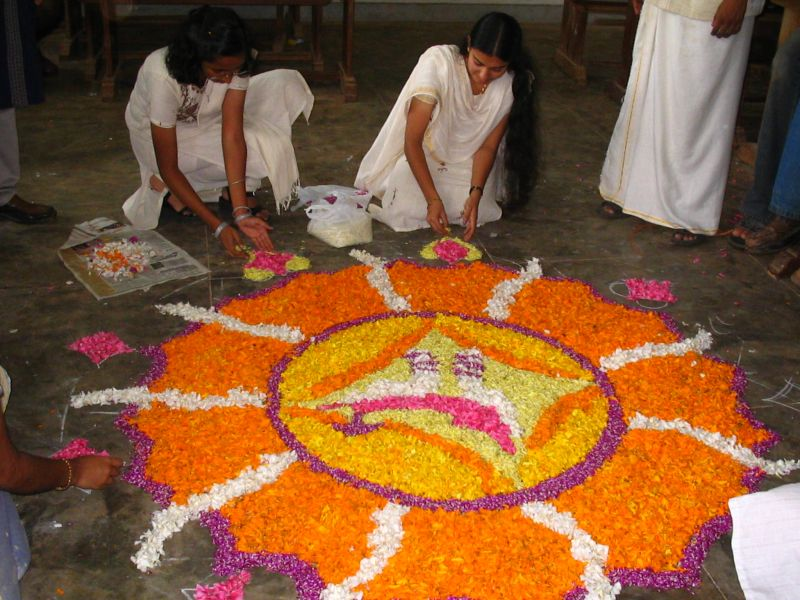
Onam pookkalam/floral carpet

Malayalis celebrate a variety of festivals, namely Onam, Vishu, Deepavali, and Christmas.

=== Cuisine ===
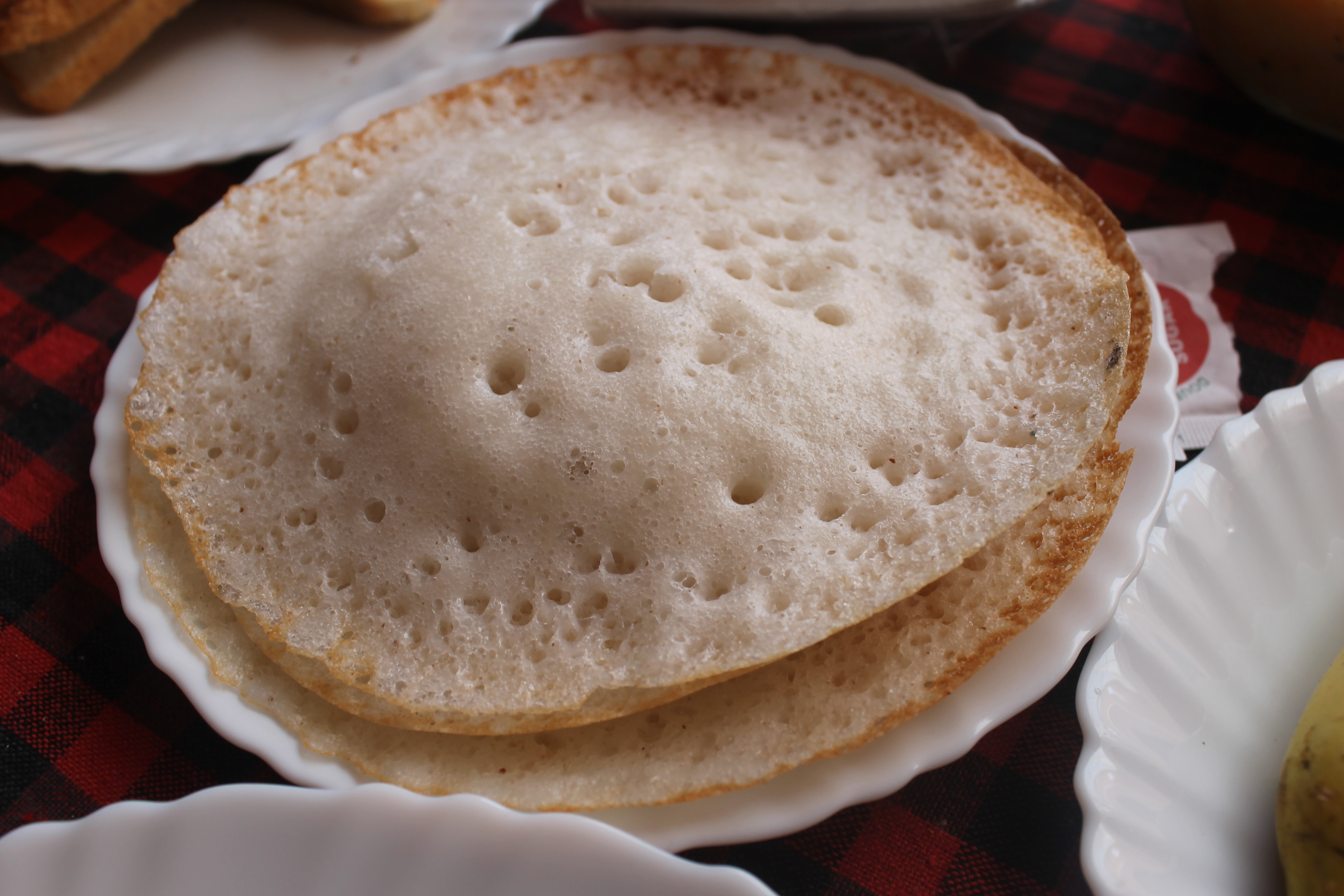
Kerala – style appam dish.

Malayali cuisine is not homogeneous and regional variations are visible throughout. Spices form an important ingredient in almost all curries. Kerala is known for its traditional sadhyas, a vegetarian meal served with boiled rice and a host of side-dishes. The sadhya is complemented by payasam, a sweet milk dessert native to Kerala. The sadhya is, as per custom, served on a banana leaf. Traditional dishes include sambar, aviyal, kaalan, theeyal, thoran, injipully, pulisherry, appam, kappa (tapioca), puttu (steamed rice powder), and puzhukku. Coconut is an essential ingredient in most of the food items and is liberally used.

Puttu is a culinary specialty in Kerala. It is a steamed rice cake which is a favorite breakfast of most Malayalis. It is served with either brown chickpeas cooked in a spicy gravy, papadams and boiled small green lentils, or tiny ripe yellow Kerala plantains. In the highlands there is also a variety of puttu served with paani (the boiled-down syrup from sweet palm toddy) and sweet boiled bananas. to steam the puttu, there is a special utensil called a puttu kutti. It consists of two sections. The lower bulkier portion is where the water for steaming is stored. The upper detachable leaner portion is separated from the lower portion by perforated lids so as to allow the steam to pass through and bake the rice powder.

Appam is a pancake made of fermented batter. The batter is made of rice flour and fermented using either yeast or toddy, the local spirit. It is fried using a special frying pan called appa-chatti and is served with egg curry, chicken curry, mutton stew, vegetable curry and chickpea curry.

Muslim cuisine or Mappila cuisine is a blend of traditional Kerala, Persian, Yemenese and Arab food culture. This confluence of culinary cultures is best seen in the preparation of most dishes. Kallummakkaya (mussels) curry, Erachi Puttu (Erachi means meat), parottas (soft flatbread), Pathiri (a type of rice pancake) and ghee rice are some of the other specialties. The characteristic use of spices is the hallmark of Mappila cuisine. spices like black pepper, cardamom and clove are used profusely. The Kerala Biryani, is also prepared by the community.

The snacks include Unnakkaya (deep-fried, boiled ripe banana paste covering a mixture of cashew, raisins and sugar), pazham nirachathu (ripe banana filled with coconut grating, molasses or sugar), Muttamala made of eggs, Chattipathiri, a dessert made of flour, like baked, layered Chapatis with rich filling, Arikkadukka and so on.

=== Martial arts ===
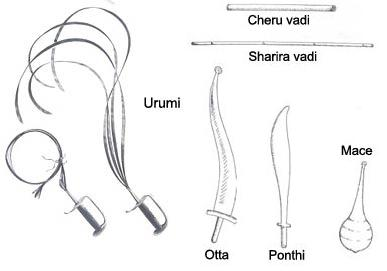
Common weapons used as part of Kalaripayatt

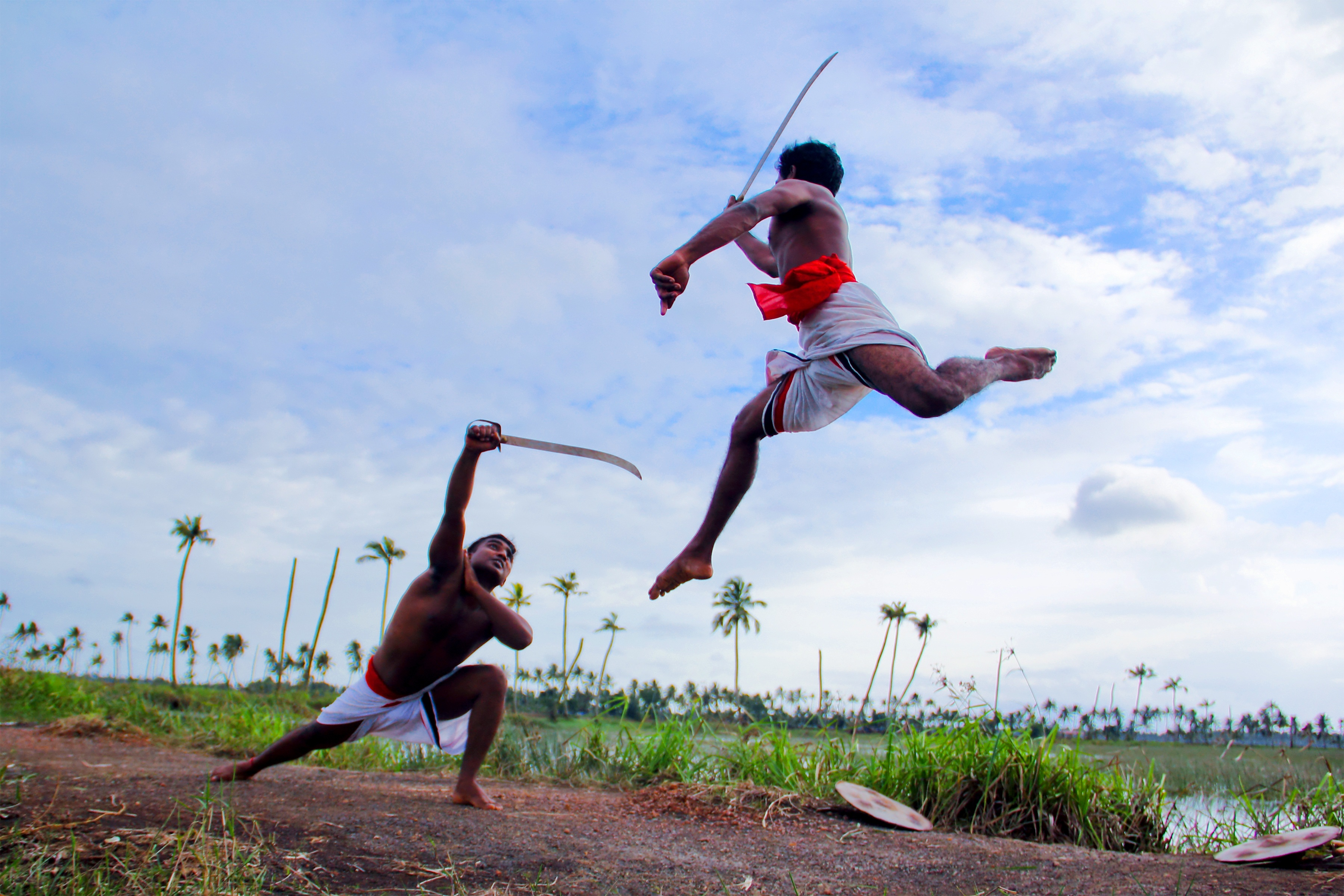
Kalaripayattu demonstration

Malayalis have their own form of martial arts called Kalaripayattu. This type of martial arts was used as a defensive mechanism against intruders. In ancient times, disputes between nobles (naaduvazhis or Vazhunors) were also settled by the outcome of a Kalaripayattu tournament. This ancient martial art is claimed as the mother of all martial arts. The word "kalari" can be traced to ancient Sangam literature.

Anthropologists estimate that Kalarippayattu dates back to at least the 12th century CE. The historian Elamkulam Kunjan Pillai attributes the birth of Kalaripayattu to an extended period of warfare between the Cheras and the Cholas in the 11th century CE. What eventually crystallized into this style is thought to have been a product of existing South Indian styles of combat, combined with techniques brought by other cultures. Kalaripayattu may be one of the oldest martial arts in existence. The oldest western reference to Kalaripayattu is a 16th-century travelogue of Duarte Barbosa, a Portuguese explorer. The southern style, which stresses the importance of hand-to-hand combat, is slightly different than Kalari in the north.

=== Recent developments (2024–2025) ===
In 2024–2025, Malayali migration trends showed increasing movement towards Europe, Australia, and Canada for higher education and skilled employment, while migration to Gulf countries continued at a comparatively slower pace than in previous decades.

Malayali diaspora organisations across the United Arab Emirates, the United Kingdom, and North America expanded cultural and welfare activities during this period. Several regions reported record participation in community events, including large-scale Onam celebrations and youth development programmes.

Consumption of Malayalam digital media continued to grow globally, with regional OTT platforms and online content creators reporting increased engagement from non-resident Malayalis. Malayalam films and literary works also received national and international recognition in 2024–2025, contributing to the community's cultural visibility.

== See also ==
- Ethnic groups in Kerala
- Garshom International Awards
- Kerala Gulf diaspora
- Malabars
- Malayalam literature
- Malayalam movie
- Malayalam script
- Malayali Australian
- Malayali cartoonists
- Malaysian Malayali
- Migrant labourers in Kerala
- Non Resident Keralites Affairs
