= Vallam kali =

Traditional boat race in Kerala

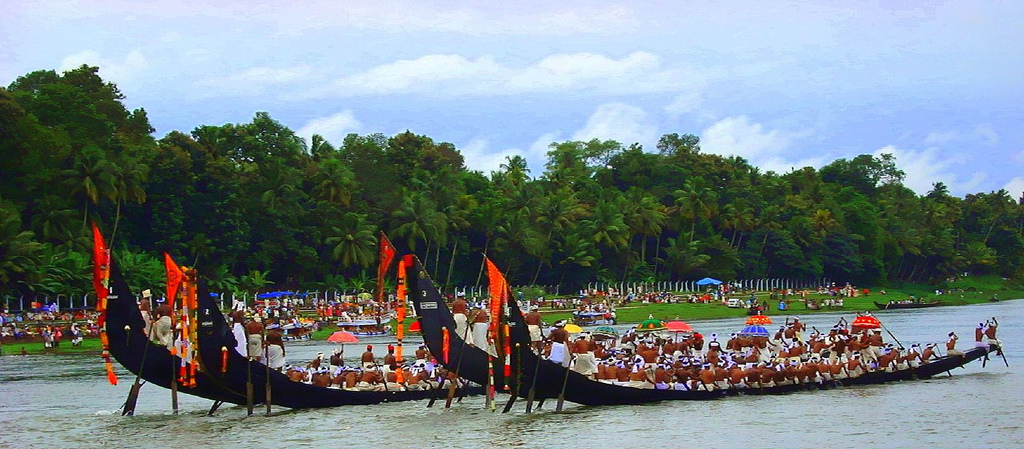
Aranmula Boat in Uthrattathi Boat Race

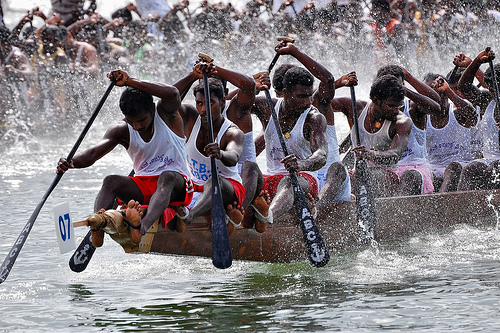
Chundan Vallam

Nehru Trophy Boat Race 2024 at Punnamada Lake, Alappuzha

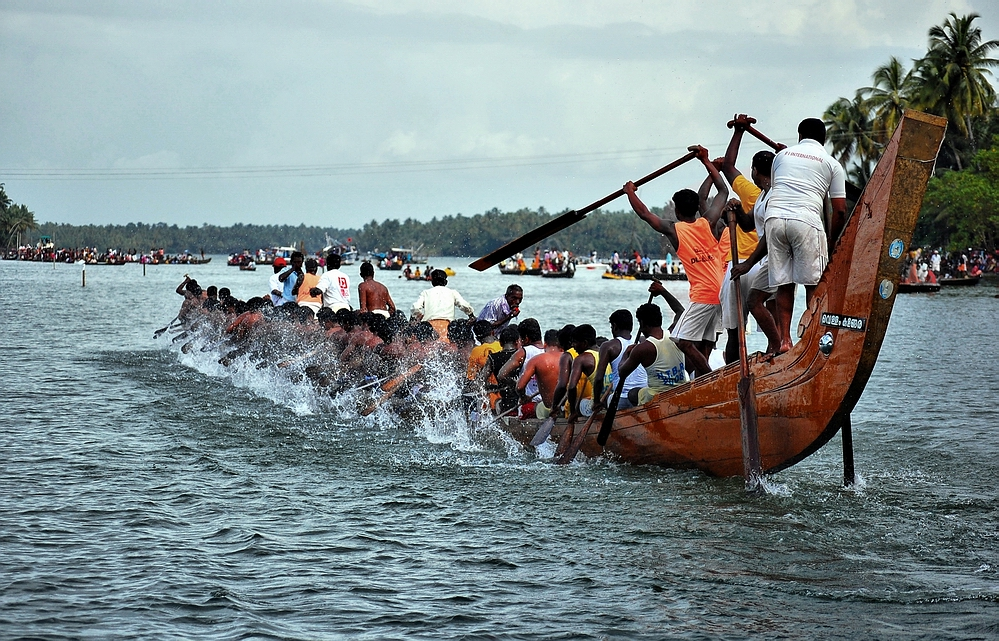
Vallam Kulangara - Snake boats

Vallam kali (vaḷḷaṃ kaḷi, literally: "boat game"), also known as snake boat race, is a traditional boat race held in the Punnamada Lake of Kerala, India. It is a form of canoe racing and uses paddled war canoes. These races typically take place during the monsoon season, from July to September, and are closely associated with the Onam festival.

== History ==
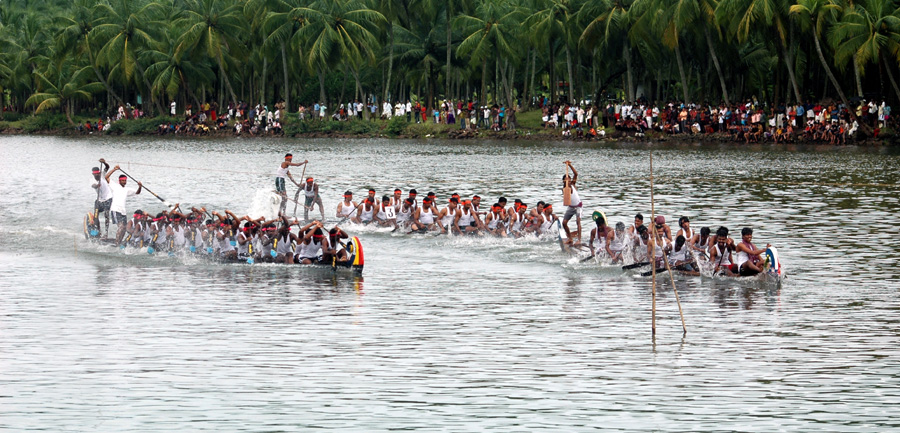
Vallam Kali

In Kerala, during an early 13th-century war between the feudal kingdoms of Kayamkulam and Chembakassery, King Devanarayana of Chembakassery commissioned the construction of a war boat named Chundan Vallam and tasked a famous carpenter of the day with the responsibility of creating it. Hence, the technical methods for creating these snake boats are around 8 centuries old. Of the snake boats still in use today, the Parthasarathi Chundan is the oldest model. For the past 400 years, the chundan vallam and other boat types started being used for vallam kali, held along many of the lakes of Kerala.

Vallam Kali was performed as a religious ritual to honor past Hindu kings and gods that dwell among the coastal temples. For example, the Aranmula Uthrattathi Boat Race, which is celebrated as a ritual to honor Lord Parthasarathy, is connected to the Aranmula Parthasarathy Temple. Due to their synchronicity with the Onam festival, they are also used to honor the legendary King Mahabali. But in the modern era, the transition from a local tradition to a state-recognized sport began in 1952, when former Prime Minister of India Jawaharlal Nehru visited Kerala and witnessed a boat race at the Punnamada Lake near Alappuzha. Captivated by the boats and the races, he decided to jump on one of the boats himself, avoiding his security. Later on that year, he decided to donate a silver trophy, which in turn became the prize for the Nehru Trophy Boat Race, one of the most famous vallam kali competitions.

=== Globalization ===
In 2019, Kerala tourism minister Kadakampally Surendran announced the establishment of a special purpose vehicle (SPV) to telecast the IPL-inspired Champions Boat League as an annual event globally, with the intention of generating revenue and tourist attraction through advertisements and sponsorships. Today, these races draw thousands of spectators from across Kerala, the rest of India, and abroad. Due to its connection with Onam, local schools often close, allowing children to join in the celebrations and watch the competitions. Not all vallam kali is competition-oriented however, with other races, like the Aranmula Uthrattathi Boat Race, still retaining their ritual aspects.

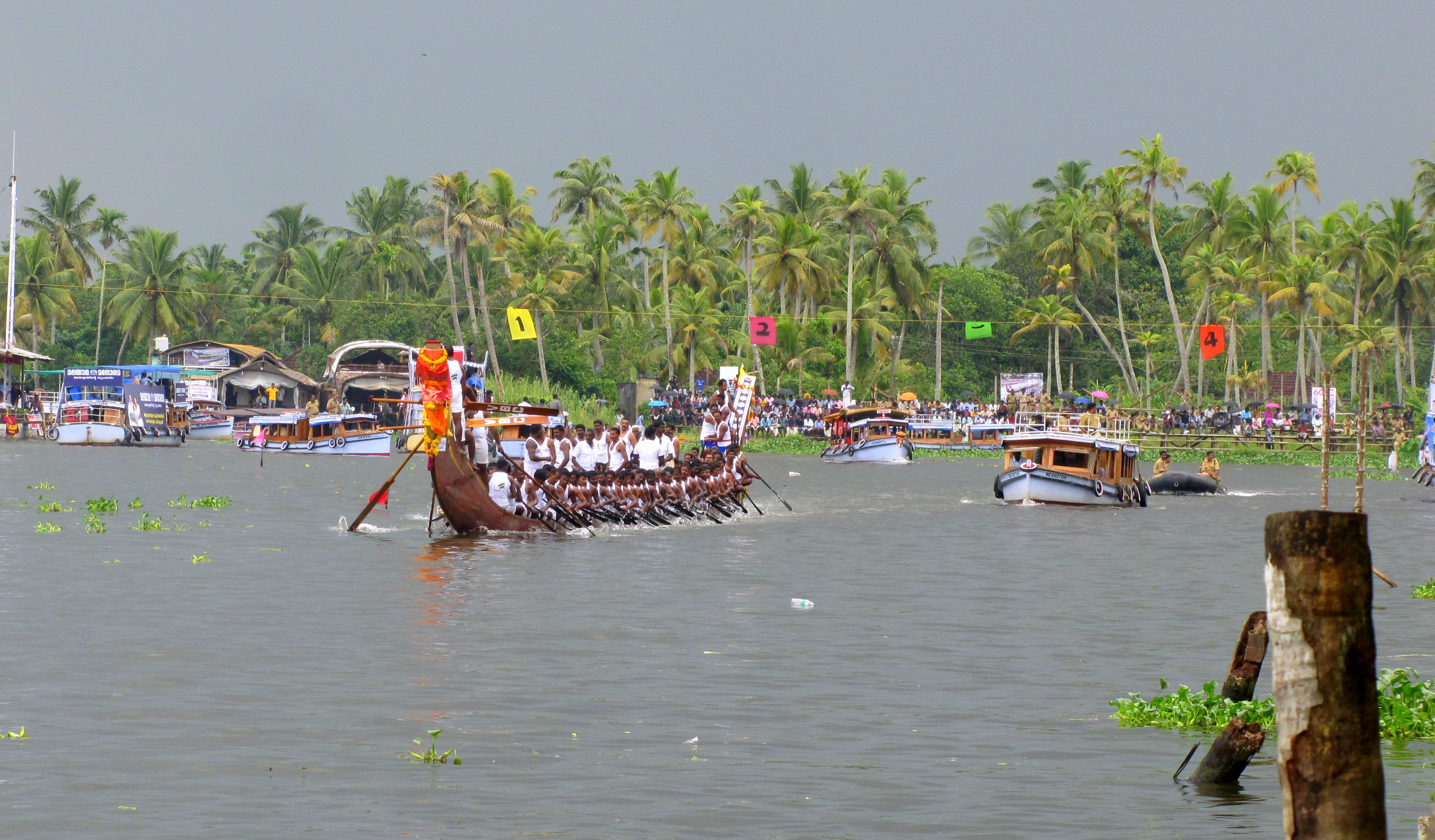
Nehru Trophy Boat Race

=== Vanchippattu ===
Vanchippattu (lit. '"boatsong"') is a form of poetry in the Malayalam language that is commonly used during vallam kali and related festivals. During Aranmula Uthrattadi Vallamkali, the vanchipattu is performed by the participants for its significance in the rituals. Ramapurathu Warrier is considered to be the pioneer of the vanchippattu.

== Types of boats ==
Vallam kali boats are designed in the style of traditional paddled war canoes. The most popular type of boat used during vallam kali is called the chundan vallam ("snake boat"). Other common types of boats used in vallam kali are listed below:

Boat Type	Description	Crew Size	Common Use
Chundan Vallam	The classic "snake boat." 100–120 feet long, it holds the record as the largest water vessel used for competitive sport. It is recognizable by its iconic raised prow, which represents the snake's hood.	64-128	Major races (e.g. Nehru Trophy)
Churulan Vallam	Smaller, more agile version, the "curly boat". It is recognizable by its symmetry and curvature; both sides of the boat – the prow and stern – rise upward, giving it a curved appearance. Exact dimensions vary by region and race.	30-40	More local races
Veppu Vallam	Known as the "cooking boat," this support boat is smaller in size and was traditionally used for provisions to soldiers during naval wars.	25-30	Short races
Odi Vallam	The "running boat." Historically used to protect cargo vessels by chasing pirates and sea robbers, this type of boat is lightweight and fast in nature, typically used for races for shorter sprints. Sometimes called iruttukuthi vallam ("dark cutted boat") since "its speed challenges darkness."	Varies	Local and community races
Vadakkanody Vallam	The "northern running boat." One of the more traditional boats, used for local races.	Varies	Community events
Kochu Vallam	Literally known as the "small boat," it is recognized for its compact size and lighter build.	Varies	Minor races

== Rules ==
Though rules mostly vary by region and type of event, standardized rules are enforced among more competitive races, in which a violation can lead to a penalty or disqualification from the race.

Each team, which represents a village or a club, is required to register their boats and display their boat name. Captains are expected to identify themselves for the duration of the race, and all rowers, with a minimum required for each boat category, are expected to be in their attire.

Major races are typically longer, with the Nehru Trophy Boat Race spanning 1.4 km in length. Before the race starts, all boats must participate in the processional period, often called the mass drill, where boats are presented and displayed. People must be lined up in two lanes to row the boat. When the race starts, the goal of each boat is to cross the finish line in the fastest time possible while staying on the allotted track. An individual timing system is placed to accurately mark the finish times of each boat down to millisecond precision. The winning team is given prize money; though amounts vary with the type and level of competition, prizes are typically over ₹1 lakh. If multiple teams finish the race within the same time, however, some competitions allow teams to share the trophy for 6 months each; the order of which team keeps the trophy first is determined by a draw. When the race concludes, each boat must immediately exit the finishing area.

== Training and preparation ==
To ensure success in the race, both the boat and its participants need to undergo months of rigorous training. As each boat represents either a village or a club, community spirit is prioritized and a key feature in vallam kali. Additionally, to preserve its religious purpose, certain rituals need to be done in participation.

The best oarsmen, typically about 150, are selected from each village. Physical conditioning is a major aspect of training, focusing on synchronizing strokes with vanchippattu. Physical training is guided by senior oarsmen, and the vanchippattu is often led by the karanaadan (captain) and four adanayampu (rudder oarsmen) of the boat. Endurance is also often needed, requiring 80-100 strokes per minute from each rower to ensure the best chance of success. Participants of each boat engage in strict abstinence and diets, limiting their nutrition to the Valla Sadhya.

Boats themselves also need to undergo strict maintenance and decoration, sometimes even year-round. A mixture of fish oil, coconut shell, and ash is used to oil the boats and keep the wood and hull strong. These repair measures are often carried out by the village carpenter and are most prioritized before and after each race. Decoration is then added, most often including cultural ornaments such as silk umbrellas and brass lamps.

Men's and women's events take place separately. Attire is less strict, but participants are often barefoot and adorn a white mundu and turban. On the day of the race, rituals and blessings are given towards the boats. In the Aranmula Parthasarathy Temple, for example, the men offer paddy, tobacco, and betel leaves to Parthasarathy and circumambulate the temple, chanting in Vanchipattu. Then boats are led to the water in the mass drill right before the race with traditional music and dance in the background, paying homage to its cultural part.

== List of periodical vallam kali events ==
Major Boat Races in Kerala (Grouped by District)
District	Race	Venue / Waterbody
Alappuzha	Champakulam Moolam Boat Race	Pamba River, Champakulam
Alappuzha	Nehru Trophy Boat Race	Punnamada Lake
Alappuzha	Pampa Boat Race	Pamba River, Neerattupuram
Alappuzha	Payippad Jalotsavam	Payippad Lake
Kollam	Kallada Boat Race	Kallada River
Kollam	Sree Narayana Boat Race	Karunagappally
Kollam	President's Trophy Boat Race	Ashtamudi Lake
Ernakulam	Gothuruth Boat Race	Periyar, Gothuruth
Ernakulam	Piravom Boat Race	Muvattupuzha River, Piravom
Ernakulam	Thuruthippuram Boat Race	Periyar, Thuruthippuram
Kottayam	Kumarakom Boat Race	Vembanad Lake, Kumarakom
Kottayam	Thazhathangadi Boat Race	Meenachil River, Thazhathangadi
Pathanamthitta	Aranmula Uthrattathi Vallamkali	Aranmula
Thrissur	Kandassankadavu Boat Race	Kandassankadavu
Thrissur	Triprayar Boat Race	Conolly Canal, Triprayar

=== Minor events ===
- Paravur Jalothsavam & Boat Race in Paravur Thekkumbhagam, Kollam district
- ATDC Boat Race, Alappuzha district
- Rajiv Gandhi Trophy Boat Race, Pulinkunnu
- Neerettupuram Pampa Boat Race
- Karuvatta Boat Race
- Kavanattinkara Boat Race
- Kumarakom Arpookara Vanitha Jalamela, Kumarakom
- Mahatma Boat Race, Mannar, Alappuzha
- Kottapuram Boat Race, Kottappuram
- Kodungallur and Kumaranasan Smaraka Jalotsavam, Pallana
- Indira Gandhi Boat Race, in Kochi Lake, Ernakulam district
- Kaithappuzhakkayal Boat Race, in Kaithappuzha Lake, Ernakulam district
- Biyyam Kaayal Boat Race, Ponnani
- Uthara Malabar Boat Race, Thejaswini Lake, Kasaragod district
- E. K. Nayanar Trophy - Malabar Jalolsavam, Mangalassery, Kuppam River, Kannur district
- Kuppam Boat Race, Kuppam River, Kannur district
- Kattampally Boat Race, Kannur district
- Madayi Boat Race, Pazhayangadi River, Pazhayangadi, Kannur district

== See also ==
- Sport in India - overview of Sports in India.
- Chundan Vallam
- Aranmula Kottaram
- Kerala backwaters
- Pacu Jalur - a traditional Indonesian boat race
