= Kallada Boat Race =

Kallada Jalotsavam കല്ലട ജലോത്സവം
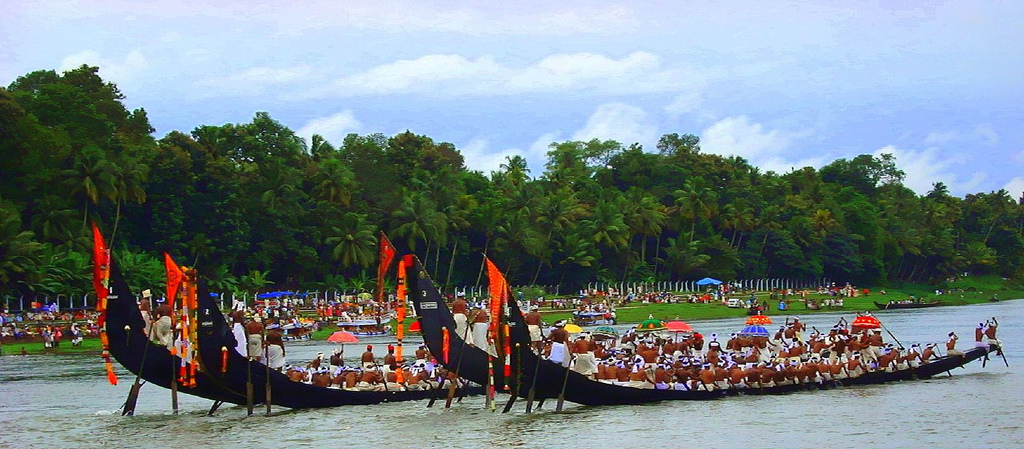
- Founded: 1969
- Region: Kollam, east kallada mandrothuruth India
- Teams: 12
- Current champions: Karichal Chundan
- Broadcaster: DD Malayalam

The Kallada Jalotsavam (കല്ലട ജലോത്സവം)is a popular Vallam Kali (boat race) held on the Kallada River at Munroe Thuruthu on 28 days after Onam (28 aam Onam) in Indian state of Kerala. The boat race is conducted along the straight portion (nettayam) of Kallada River. Famous achievers in various fields are honoured during the event.

The boat race can be conveniently viewed from Munroe Island (Munroethuruthu in vernacular). Munroe Island holds an important place in the tourist map of Kerala. The country boat sightseeing across Munroe Island conducted by the Kollam district tourist promotion council is the best of its kind in the country. Munroe Island can be reached from Kollam railway station by road (28 km), 12 km from Kundara and 24 km from Karunagapally at North. Kollam is 71 km away by road from the Trivandrum airport.

The competitions will be preceded by a colourful sail-past and mass drill by the boats competing in the race.

== About the event ==
The boat race is an annual event which happens 28 days after Onam (28 aam Onam).

== Boats ==
12 Snake boats including 5 Iruttukuthi A grade boats and vepp a b boats will participate.

== Trophies and prize money ==
The winners will be awarded Kallada rolling trophy and ₹100,000, ₹50,000, ₹25,000 and ₹15,000 respectively as first to fourth places, and ₹50,000 will be given to each team as bonus.

== Winners ==
| Year | Winners | Club |
|---|---|---|
| 2007 | Karichal Chundan | Jesus Boat Club |
| 2008 | Karichal Chundan | Jesus Boat Club |
| 2009 | Payippad Chudan | Kannetti Sangam Boat Club |
| 2010 | Karichal Chundan | Jesus Boat Club |
| 2011 | Sree Ganesh Chundan | St Francis Boat Club |
| 2012 | Sree Ganesh Chundan | St Francis Boat Club |
| 2013 | Sree Ganesh Chundan | St Francis Boat club |
| 2014 | Sree Ganesh Chundan | St Francis Boat club |
| 2015 | Mahadevikad Kattil Thekkathil Chundan | St Francis Boat club |
| 2016 | Ayaparamb Pandi | UBC Kainakari |
| 2017 | St Pious 10th Mankomp | Venad Boat Club, Kallada (SFBC) |
| 2018 | Not Conducted |
| 2019 | Nadubhagam | Pallathuruthi Boat Club(PBC) |
| 2020 | Not Conducted |
| 2021 | Not Conducted |
| 2022 | Mahadevikad Kattil Thekkathil Chundan | Pallathuruthi Boat Club(PBC) |
| 2023 | Veeyapuram | Pallathuruthi Boat Club(PBC) |
| 2024 | Not Conducted |
| 2023 | Veeyapuram | Village Boat Club Kainakari(VBC) |

== Other renowned boat races in Kerala ==
- President's Trophy Boat Race
- Nehru Trophy Boat Race
- Champakulam Moolam Boat Race
- Aranmula Uthrattadi Vallamkali
- Payippad Jalotsavam
- Kumarakom Boat Race
- Indira Gandhi Boat Race
- Gothuruth Boat Race since 1938, Ernakullam www.gothuruthboatrace.com
