= Triprayar Boat Race =

Triprayar Boat Race തൃപ്രയാര്‍ ജലോത്സവം
- Region: Triprayar, Thrissur District, Kerala, India
- Teams: 20
- Current champions: New Pallavy Boat Club, Palazhy

The Triprayar Boat Race (Malayalam: തൃപ്രയാര്‍ ജലോത്സവം) is a popular Vallam Kali held in the Conolly Canal in Triprayar of Thrissur District, Kerala, India. The boat race is conducted by the Thriprayar Arts and Sports Club in front of the Shree Rama Temple. The race is for 3 kilometre from Vennakkadavu to Triprayar.

== Winners ==
Year	Club	Winners
2004	Jiji Group	Sree Guruvayurappan
2010	Kuzupullikara Golden Rover	Valliya Pandithan
2011	Padur Yuvyagana Kala Samithi Boat Club	Hanuman No 1
2012	Padur Yuvyagana Kala Samithi Boat Club	Hanuman
2013	Thanthonithruth TBC	Thaniyan
2014	Padur Yuvajana Kala Samithi Boat Club	St Sebastin
2022	New Pallavy Boat club, Palazhy	Thaniyan

== Other races in Kerala ==
- Kumarakom Boat Race
- Nehru Trophy Boat Race
- Kandassankadavu Boat Race
- President's Trophy Boat Race
- Aranmula Uthrattadi Vallamkali
