= Nehru Trophy Boat Race =

Annual boat race in Kerala

- First played: 1952

Characteristics
- Team members: 64 or 128 paddlers aboard per side
- Type: Vallam Kali
- Equipment: Snake boat, Iruttukuthy Boat, Veppu Boat, Thekkanodi Boat
- Venue: Punnamada Lake

Presence
- Country or region: India

The Nehru Trophy Boat Race is an annual vallam kali held in the Punnamada Lake near Alappuzha in Kerala. Vallam Kali or Vallamkali literally means boat play or game, but is translated to boat race in English. The most popular event of the race is the competition of Chundan Vallams, meaning snake boats. Hence the race is also known as Snake Boat Race. Other categories of boats participating in various race events are Churulan Vallam, Iruttukuthy Vallam, Odi Vallam, Veppu Vallam (Vaipu Vallam), Vadakkanody Vallam and Kochu Vallam.

== History ==
This boat race has its origin in the Kerala district Alappuzha and was inaugurated in 1952 by Prime Minister Jawaharlal Nehru. The winner was awarded a trophy in the name of Jawaharlal Nehru.

Nehru visited Alappuzha on 22 December 1952 and travelled through the Kuttanad backwaters, where the people of the region received him with a fleet of snake boats. An impromptu race of nine boats was rowed in his honour and the Nadubhagam Chundan won; Nehru then climbed onto the winning boat and rode it to Alappuzha.

After returning to Delhi, Nehru sent a silver trophy shaped like a snake boat, bearing his signature and the words "To the winners of the boat race which is a unique feature of the community life of Travancore Cochin". The award was first called the Prime Minister's Trophy and later became known as the Nehru Trophy. The first formal race for the trophy was held in 1954 at the Kainakary backwaters, and it was later moved to a course on Punnamada Lake at Alappuzha, where it has been held since.

In 2019, Nehru Trophy Boat Race was also made a part of the newly constituted CBL - Champions Boat League and Star Sports Network became its television broadcasting partner.

The 2020 and 2021 seasons of the league were dropped due to the COVID-19 pandemic.

In 2024 the edition was postponed due to Wayanad landslides and held on September 28.

Nehru Trophy Boat Race 2024

== Course and format ==
The race is traditionally held on the second Saturday of August. The main event is rowed on Punnamada Lake over a course of about 1.4 kilometres (0.87 mi), divided into parallel tracks marked with bamboo poles, with several snake boats racing at a time. A chundan vallam (snake boat) is more than 100 feet (30 m) long and is paddled by a large crew.

Nehru Trophy Boat Race 2024

== Winners ==
As a Club United Boat club Kainakary(UBC Kainakary) won the most number of trophies in Nehru Trophy boat Race With 2 hattrick. Karichal chundan has the most number of Nehru trophies, a total of 16. The current hat-trick title for continuously winning 5 times in a row is held by Pallathuruthy boat club . The fastest Snake boat was won by Karichal chundan rowed by Pallathuruthy Boat Club in the 2024 Boat Race with a time of 4.14.35

Year	Club	Winners	Captain	Reference
1952	Nadubhagam Boat club	Nadubhagam Chundan	Chacko Mappila Maathu Mappila	
1954	Kavalam team	Kavalam Chundan	Thomman Joseph	
1955	Nedumudi NSS Karayogam	Paarthasarathi Chundan	KG Raghavan Nair	
1956	Kavalam team	Kavaalam Chundan	Thomman Joseph	
1957	Ponga Boat club	Nepoleon Chundan	Joseph Cheriyan	
1958	Ponga Boat club Kavalam Boat Club	Nepoleon Chundan Kavalam Chundan	Cheriyan Joseph TJ Job	
1959	Ponga Boat club	Nepoleon Chundan	Cheriyan Varghese	
1960	Kavalam boat club	Kavalam Chundan	Maathachan	
1961	Ponga Boat club	Nepoleon Chundan	Cheriyan Varghese	
1962	Kavalam boat club	Kavaalam Chundan	TJ Job	
1963	U.B.C Kainakary	Kainakary Chundan	PK Thankachan	
1964	U.B.C Kainakary	St. George Chundan	PK Thankachan	
1965	U.B.C Kainakary	Parthasarathi Chundan	PK Thankachan	
1966	Pulinkunnu boat club	Pulinkunnu Chundan	Thommichan	
1967	Pulinkunnu boat club	Pulinkunnu Chundan	Thommichan	
1968	U.B.C Kainakary	Parthasarathi Chundan	PK Thankachan	
1969	Pulinkunnu boat club	Pulinkunnu Chundan	CC Chakko	
1970	U.B.C Kainakary	Kallooparamban Chundan	Varghese Antony	
1971	Kumarakam boat club Champakulam boat club	Kallooparamban chundan Pulinkunnu Chundan	Nellanickal Pappachan Chakkamma Kannotuthara	
1972	Kumarakam boat club	Kallooparamban Chundan	Nellanickal Pappachan	
1973	Kumarakam boat club	Kallooparamban Chundan	Nellanickal Pappachan	
1974	Friends boat club	Karichal chundan	PC Joseph	
1975	Friends boat club	Karichal chundan	PC Joseph	
1976	UBC Kainakary	Karichal chundan	PK Thankachan	
1977	Thayankari boat club	Jawahar Thayankari Chundan	KS Varghese	
1978	Thayankari boat club	Jawahar Thayankari Chundan	KS Varghese	
1979	UBC Kainakary	Aayaparambu Valiya Diwanji Chundan	Ravi Prakash	
1980	Pullangady boat club	Karichal chundan	Ramachandran	
1981	No Winners			
1982	Kumarakam boat club	Karichal chundan	Nellanickal Pappachan	
1983	Kumarakam boat club	Karichal chundan	Nellanickal Pappachan	
1984	Kumarakam boat club	Karichal chundan	Nellanickal Pappachan	
1985	Friends boat club	Jawahar Thayankari Chundan	PC Joseph	
1986	Village Boat Club, Kainakary	Karichal chundan	Sanni Akkarakkalam	
1987	Village Boat Club, Kainakary	Karichal chundan	Sanni Akkarakkalam	
1988	Pallathurathi boat club	Vellamkulangara Chundan	TP Rajbhavan	
1989	UBC Kainakary	Champakulam Chundan	AK Lalasan	
1990	UBC Kainakary	Champakulam Chundan	AK Lalasan	
1991	UBC Kainakary	Champakulam Chundan	AK Lalasan	
1992	Sreelakshmana boat club	Kallooparamban Chundan	VN Velayudhan	
1993	UBC Kainakary	Kallooparamban Chundan	C G Vijayan Mampalathuchira	
1994	Jet Airways	Champakulam Chundan	Antony Akkarakkalam	
1995	Alappuzha boat club	Champakulam Chundan	Jos Jhon	
1996	Alappuzha boat club	Champakulam Chundan	Anil Madhavan	
1997	Navajeevan club	Alappat Chundan	KP Poul	
1998	Pallathuruthi boat club	Champakulam Chundan	Domanic Kuzhimattom	
1999	Kumarakam town boat club	Alappat Chundan	Sampath Kaniyamparampil	
2000	Alappuzha boat club	Karichal chundan	Bency Moonnuthickal	
2001	Friends boat club	Karichal chundan	Tobin Chandy	
2002	Kumarakam boat club	Vellamkulangara Chundan	Sanny Jakob	
2003	Navajeevan boat club	Karichal chundan	Thampi Podippara	
2004	Kumarakam Town boat club	Cheruthana Chundan	Raju Vadakkath	
2005	Kumarakam Town boat club	Payippad Chundan	Raju Vadakkath	
2006	Kumarakam Town boat club	Payippad Chundan	Raju Vadakkath	
2007	Kumarakam Town boat club	Payippad Chundan	Kunjumon Meluvallil	
2008	Kollam Jesus Boat Club	Karichal chundan	JiJi Jacob Pollayil	
2009	Kollam Jesus Boat Club	Champakulam chundan	JiJi Jacob Pollayil	
2010	Kumarakam Town Boat Club	Jawahar Thayankari Chundan	Joseph Philip	
2011	Freedom boat Club	Karichal chundan	Jiji Jacob Pollayil	
2012	Freedom boat Club	Sri Ganesh Chundan	JiJi Jacob Pollayil	
2013	Harippadu Star Boat Club	Sri Ganesh Chundan	Arun Kumar	
2014	United Boat Club Kainakary	Chambakulam Chundan	George Thomas	
2015	Kumarakam Vembanad Boat Club	Jawahar Thayankari Chundan	Jameskutty Jacob	
2016	Kumarakam Vembanad Boat Club	Karichal chundan	Jameskutty Jacob	
2017	Thuruthippuram Boat Club	Gabriel Chundan	Ummen Jacob	
2018	Pallathuruthi Boat Club	Payippadan Chundan	James Kutty Jacob	
2019	Pallathuruthi Boat Club	Nadubhagam Chundan	Narayanankutty N Udayan	
2022	Pallathuruthi Boat Club	Mahadevikadu Kattil Thekkathil	Santhosh Chacko	
2023	Pallathuruthi Boat Club	Veeyapuram Chundan	Alan Moonnuthickal	
2024	Pallathuruthi Boat Club	Karichal chundan	Alan Moonnuthickal	
2025	Village Boat Club, Kainakary	Veeyapuram Chundan	Biffy Varghese	
2026	Aroma Boat Club	Aroma-1 Chundan	Ranjith Sajeev	

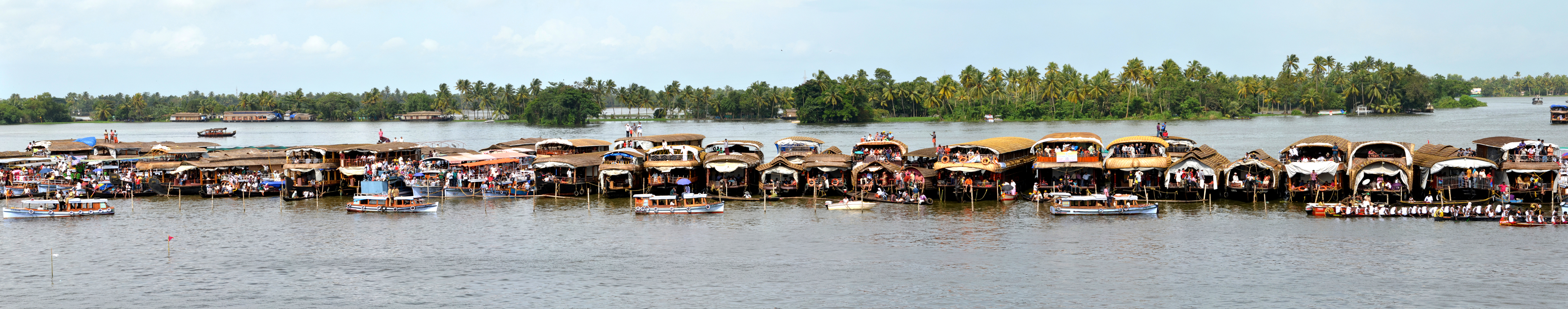
People watching Nehru Trophy Boat Race, 2013

== See also ==
- President's Trophy Boat Race
- Kumarakom Boat Race
- Triprayar Boat Race
- Kandassankadavu Boat Race
- Kallada Boat Race
- Champakulam Moolam Boat Race
- Aranmula Uthrattadi Vallamkali
- Payippad Jalotsavam
