= Champions Boat League =

Boat race in Kerala, India

The Champions Boat League also known as CBL is an IPL style professional snake boat regatta held in Kerala, India.

Teams participate in a series of 12 established traditional boat races to compete for the top spots. The first season of CBL was held in 2019, inaugurated by Sachin Tendulkar. It started with the Nehru Trophy on 10 August and ended with the President's Trophy on 1November. Around 1.8 crore people watched the first edition on eight television channels in India and abroad, and 22 lakh people watched the races online. The first season was originally planned for 2018 but it was postponed owing to the floods in the state. The boat league was also cancelled in 2020 and 2021 due to the COVID-19 pandemic.

The event is an attempt to promote traditional festivals in Kerala, so the Government allocates funds for holding the event.

== Teams ==
The first event saw nine clubs participating, rising to twelve clubs in 2022.

=== Current teams ===
Boat Club	Team Name
Pallathuruthi Boat Club, Alappuzha	Tropical Titans
Police Boat Club	Raging Rowers
United Boat Club, Kuttamangalam, Kainakary	Coast Dominators
NCDC/Kumarakom	Mighty Oars
Village Boat Club Edathua	Backwater Knights
KBC/SFBC, Kumarakom	Thunder Oars
Vembanad Boat Club, Kumarakom	Pride Chasers
Town Boat Club, Kumarakom	Backwater Warriors
Brothers Boat Club, Edathua	Backwater Ninjas
