= Karichal chundan =

Notable snakeboat in Kerala

Karichal Chundan is a famous Chundan vallam (snake boat) that belongs to a village called Karichal which is located at the south of Veeyapuram Panchayat near to Haripad in Karthikappally taluk, Alappuzha, Kerala. Karichal Chundan has won the most number of trophies in Nehru Trophy Boat Race and also won many trophies in different boat races(Vallam kali).Karichal Chundan is known as the Emperor of snake boat races and alos known as Kari.The boat has participated in the Nehru Trophy Boat Race final 33 times.

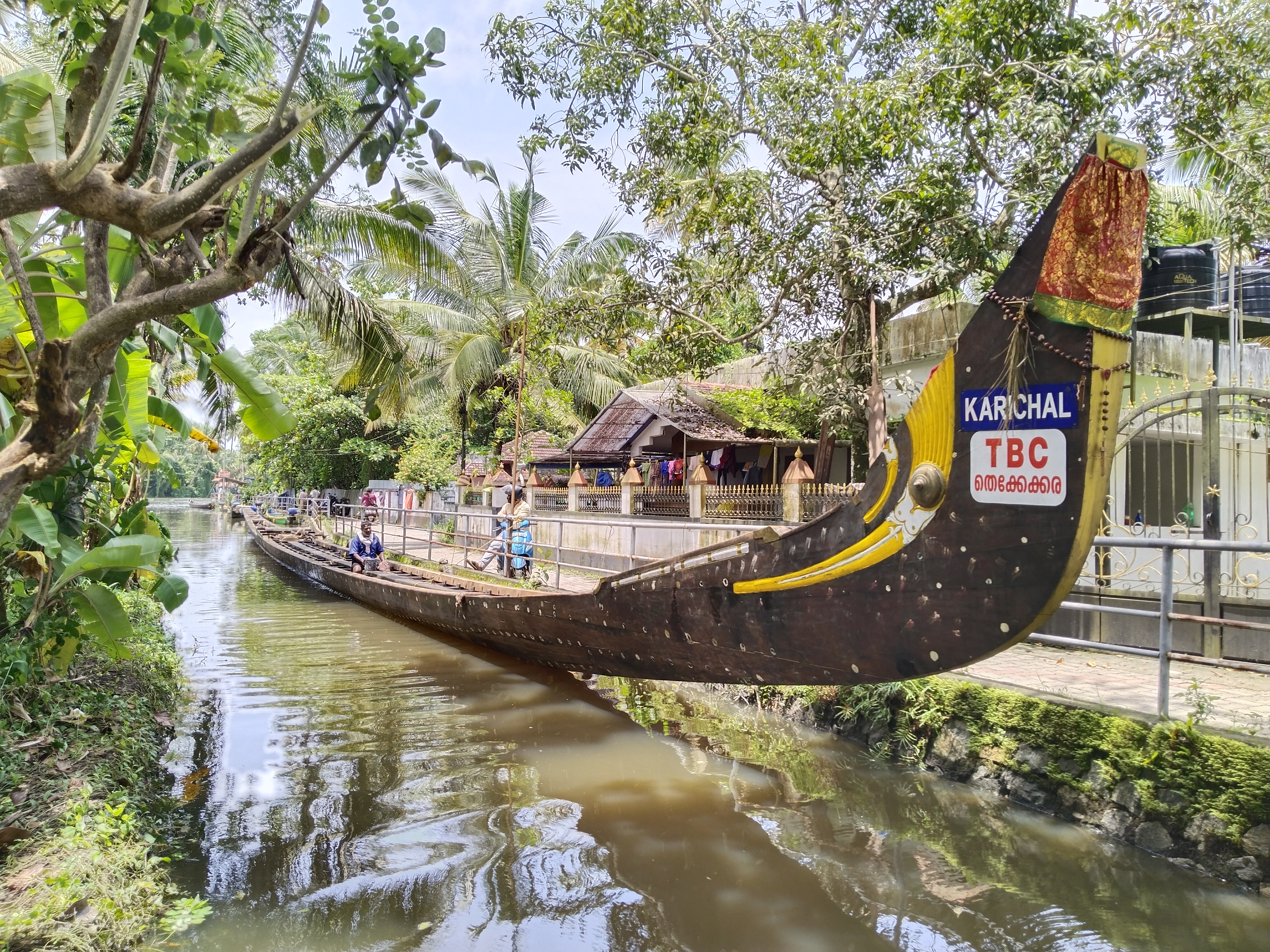
The Karichal Chundan famous snake boat of Kerala

The people of Karichal area owned this snake boat, this chundan vallam was launched on 8 September 1970. It is 53.25 koal long and 51 angulam in breadth. It was constructed by a team led by Kozhimukku Narayanan Achari.

== Winning List of Nehru Trophy Boat Race ==
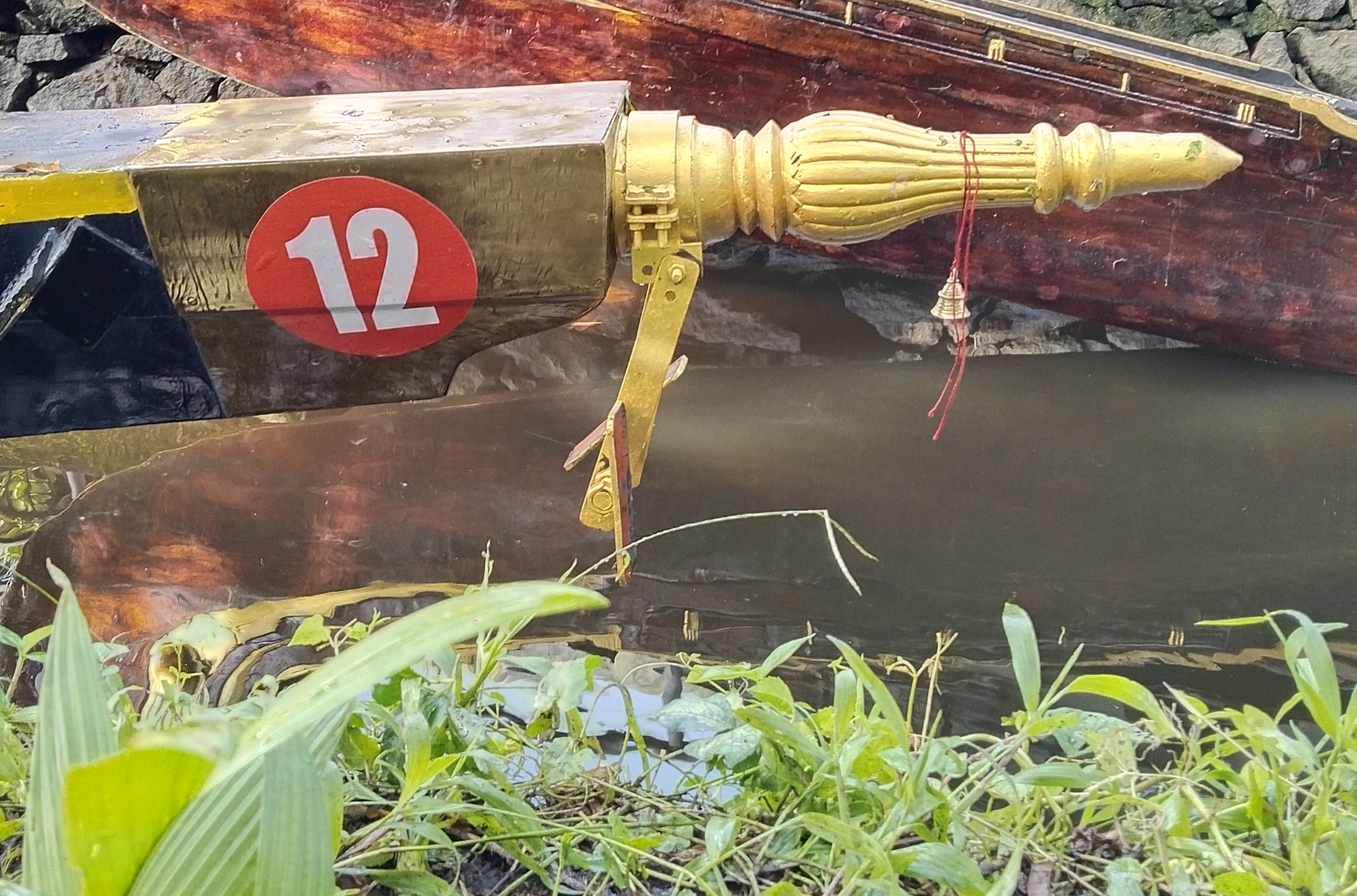
The koomb of Karichal Chundan

Year	Club	Captain
1974	Friends boat club	PC Joseph
1975	Friends boat club	PC Joseph
1976	UBC Kainakary	PK Thankachan
1980	Pullangady boat club	Ramachandran
1982	Kumarakam boat club	Nellanickal Pappachan
1983	Kumarakam boat club	Nellanickal Pappachan
1984	Kumarakam boat club	Nellanickal Pappachan
1986	Village boat club, Kainakary	Sanni Akkarakkalam
1987	Village boat club, Kainakary	Sanni Akkarakkalam
2000	Alappuzha boat club	Bency Randuthikkal
2001	Friends boat club	Tobin Chandy
2003	Navajeevan boat club	Thampi Podippara
2008	Kollam Jesus Boat Club	JiJiJacob Pollayil
2011 (As per the court order, declared as winner in 2022)	Freedom Boat Club	JiJiJacob Pollayil
2016	Kumarakam Vembanad Boat Club	Jameskutty Jacob
2024	Pallathurthi Boat Club	Alan Moonnuthickal
