= Kandassankadavu Boat Race =

Kandassankadavu Boat Race കണ്ടശ്ശാംകടവ് ജലോത്സവം
- Founded: 1956
- Region: Kandassankadavu, Thrissur District, Kerala, India
- Current champions: Mahadevan Chundan

The Kandassankadavu Boat Race (Malayalam: കണ്ടശ്ശാംകടവ് ജലോത്സവം) is a popular Vallam Kali held in the Enamakkal Lake and Conolly Canal in Kandassankadavu of Thrissur District, Kerala, India. The race is conducted on the Thiruvonam day of the Onam festival followed by a 10-day festival. The trophy is known as Chief Minister's Ever-Rolling Trophy. Competitions were held for the Iruttukuthi and Churulan boats category.

== History ==
The race was started in 1955 when the Kerala state was formed. Due to financial problems the boat race was stopped by the organisers for a long time. In 2011, with the support of Government of Kerala, Thrissur District Tourist Promotion and Manaloor Grama Panchayat the race was restarted.

== Winners ==
Year	Club	Winners
2011	Chengannur Edakulam Junior CBS	Vadeka Attpuram Chundan
2012	Al Reyami Group	Chambakkulam Chundan
2013	Manappuram Group	Mahadevan Chundan
2014	Thayankari Boat club	Pulinkunnu Chundan

== Other races in Kerala ==
- Triprayar Boat Race
- Kumarakom Boat Race
- Nehru Trophy Boat Race
- President's Trophy Boat Race
- Aranmula Uthrattadi Vallamkali
