= Kottathur =

- village
- Location in Kerala, India Kottathur (India)
- Coordinates: 9.356944°N 76.747500°E
- Country: India
- State: Kerala
- District: Pathanamthitta

Languages
  - Official: Malayalam, English
- Time zone: UTC+5:30 (IST)
- PIN: 689614
- Telephone code: 04735-23
- Vehicle registration: KL3-

Kottathur is a prominent ward in Ayroor Panchayat situated on the eastern part of Ayroor, in Pathanamthitta district of Kerala state, India.

There are no authentic records of the origin of the name Kottathur. Its believed that Ayroor was under the Kovillan rule during the12th century AD. It is also believed that Pattalathara a three acre level land was the parade ground of the soldiers of the Kovillans and later converted to agricultural land.

The Pamba River flows by the southern side of the settlement, providing fertile soil. Silt from the pumpa river used to spread a kilo meter width during the floods in Pumpa river. Thus sugarcane was widely cultivated in the silt land adjacent to the river. The Kottathur wet land starting from Pattalathara purayidam and reaching Kuzhimoottil and valiya thodu starting from Thekumkal pattalathara flows around 5 km and drains to the Pumpa river. The wetland was used to cultivate rice two times a year. Another wetland named Attathodu padam originated from Attathottu parambil and reaching the Ranni Cherukolpuzha Rosd.

Kottathur is in the parliamentary constituency of Pathanamthitta.

The ward has hundred percent literacy. Hindus and Christian population live harmoniously. There are 4 churches, a Puthiyakavu temple, a SNDP Guru mandiram, a NSS mandiram and a high school in the ward.

== Geography ==
The Pamba river and the surrounding hills and valleys make Kottathur one of the most picturesque places in Ayrioor. Residents of Kottathur cultivate coconut, rubber, tapioca, plantains, peppers, arackanut, cashews, nutmeg, rice, and many different types of fruits and vegetables.

== Economy ==
One of the specialties is the vibrant NRI community in Kottathur whose remittance resulted in a change in the economy during the past 30 years. (Gulf-American-Malaya) in Ayroor.

== Demographics ==
Various sections of Christianity and Hinduism co-exist harmoniously. Followers of St. Thomas Christians, the Syrian Mar Thoma, the Syrian Orthodox churches, pentecostal churches form the predominant Churches in Kottathur.

== Religion ==
=== Churches ===
Churches in the area include: St. Thomas Orthodox Syrian Church Mathapara, Salem Marthoma Church Ayroor, St. Thomas Evanjalical Church, and Orthodox Church Udumbinmala.

== Temples ==
Main Hindu temple- Ayroor Puthiyakavu Devi temple is on the bank of river Pampa. Makara Bharani festival is one of the festivals celebrated in the temple.

== Boat races ==
Kottathur Palliyodam won awards in the Aranmula Boat Race on several occasions.

== Shree Narayana Group ==
SNDP (Sree Narayana Dharma Paripalanam) is a landmark building on the Puthiakavu - Thekumkal road with a statue of Sri Narayana Guru, a reformist and Guru highly respected by the people of Kerala especially the Ezhava community. The building was built in 1949-50. The birth day of Sri Narayana Guru is celebrated with a procession, fire work and pancha vadyam on the 'Chathayam'day of the Malayalam month Chingam.

== Nair Community ==
NSS (Nair Service Society) building on Vettikadu is a landmark building.

== Post Office ==
Kottathur post office is situated at Mathappara.
