= Champakulam Moolam Boat Race =

Annual boat race in Kerala, India

Champakulam Moolam Boat Race

The Champakulam Moolam Boat Race is one of the oldest vallam kali (snake boat race) (after the Aranmula Boat Race) in Kerala state of south India. The race is held on the River Pamba on Moolam day (according to the Malayalam Era M.E) of the Malayalam month Midhunam, the day of the installation of the deity at the Ambalappuzha Sree Krishna Swamy Temple.

== The legend ==
It is said that the Raja of Chempakasseri, Pooradam Thirunal Devanarayanan, built a temple at Ambalappuzha as suggested by the royal astrologers, but just before the installation of the deity (Lord Krishna) he was informed that the idol was not auspicious.

It was important to install a suitable idol immediately. Accordingly, the priests identified another idol of Lord Krishna, kept at the Karinkulam temple in Kurichi. This idol was believed to have been given to Arjuna by Lord Krishna himself, and was therefore considered very sacred. After getting the idol from Karinkulam temple, the Raja's men set forth by boat for the return journey. While returning to Ambalappuzha, night set in, and, as instructed by the Raja, they took shelter at a local Hindu household. There is some contradictry story around christian household in Kerala at that time which is unlikely as christian missionaries made their way into India during colonial era which is much later.

The local family received the men and the idol with great honour. The next day, the Raja and his entourage turned up at Mappilassery, accompanied by a huge mass of people. Pujas were offered to the deity and the family and village men also travelled with the flotilla to Ambalapuzha where the idol was duly consecrated and installed with great fanfare.

These events took place in 1545 A.D. The Raja, declared that henceforth, to commemorate these events, a great water carnival would be held at Champakulam every year, on Moolam day - the birth nakshtra of Lord Krishna - in the Malayalam month of Mithunam. Thus began the Champakulam Snake Boat Race and related functions, which continue to this day.

In 1613 A.D., sixty-three years after the idol was given shelter at Mappilassery, the old house was being demolished and a new one being built. Raja Devanarayanan's successor heard the news and immediately sent word to Itty Thommen's son, Kunhi Thommen that the area where the idol was kept, which was considered a devasthanam or sacred place, was to be specially demarcated and used only as a place of worship. Also, in keeping with Hindu practices, no menstruating women were to enter the room. A special lamp, made of rare metals, was given to the family, to be kept in this holy place, and perpetually burning, as an eternal flame. Special privileges were also conferred on the family, including the grant of lands and coconut groves to supply the oil for the lamp.

Even today, these practices continue. The lamp is kept perpetually burning. Every year priests and other delegates from the temple call at the house on Moolam day, with gifts and prasadam for the karanavar or head of the house. This ceremony is known as the Moolakazcha. It is believed that on Moolam Day, Lord Krishna resides not at the Temple, but at Mappilassery House! Reverentially, on unshod feet, the Temple delegates enter the prayer room, where along with Christian icons like the cross, and statues of Jesus and Mary, the lamp, known as the Vazhakoombu Vilakku is given a place of prominence. The temple representatives then venerate the lamp, and are treated by the family to a sumptuous feast. It is only after all these ceremonies, that the famous Champakulam Snake Boat Race commences.

== Other renowned boat races in Kerala ==
- Aranmula Uthrattadi Vallamkali
- Nehru Trophy Boat Race
- President's Trophy Boat Race
- Payippad Jalotsavam
- Kumarakom Boat Race
- Kallada Boat Race
