= Kuttandan Punchayile =

"Kuttandan Punchayile" is a boat race vanchipattu popular in Kerala. The lyrics of the song are from the 1967 film Kavalam Chundan.
