= Sree Narayana Jayanthi Boat Race =

Annual Keralite boat race

Sree Narayana Jayanthi Boat Race

The Sree Narayana Jayanthi Vallam Kali or Boat Race, at Kumarakom, Kerala, India is held in September every year during Onam festival.

== See also ==
- Aranmula Uthrattadi Vallamkali
- Champakulam Moolam Boat Race
- Kallada Boat Race
- Kandassankadavu Boat Race
- Nehru Trophy Boat Race
- President's Trophy Boat Race
- Triprayar Boat Race
- Vallam Kali
