= Malayali cartoonists =

Malayali cartoonists are those Malayalees who draw cartoons in Malayalam language and English.

- K. Shankar Pillai
- O. V. Vijayan
- Abu Abraham
- Ravi shankar
- Yesudasan
- Jitheshji
- Gopikrishnan
- P. K. Manthri
- Malayatoor Ramakrishnan
- E. P. Unni
