= Kuchelavritham Vanchippattu =

Poem in Malayalam

Kuchelavritham Vanchippattu or Sudamavritham Vanchippattu is a famous Vanchippattu written by Ramapurathu Warrier in Malayalam. It was based on the story of Sudama also known as Kuchela in Bhagavata. It was written as per a suggestion of Marthanda Varma, the king of Travancore. It has great popularity in Malayalam literature and culture.

== Period ==
It is not known exactly when the Kuchelavritham was written. The historians noted that it was written during the reign of Marthanda Varma. According to K. R. Krishnapillai, a historian it was written during 1745-1750 AD. There is also an opinion that it was written during 1756 AD.

== Structure and content ==
Kuchelavritham was written in the metre Nathonnatha. The poem contains 698 lines. Warrior uses 96 lines for praising Marthanda Varma and Padmanabhaswamy Temple and 132 lines for describing the Krishna. Others are dealing with the story of Kuchela.9
