= Cantor =

Person who leads people in singing

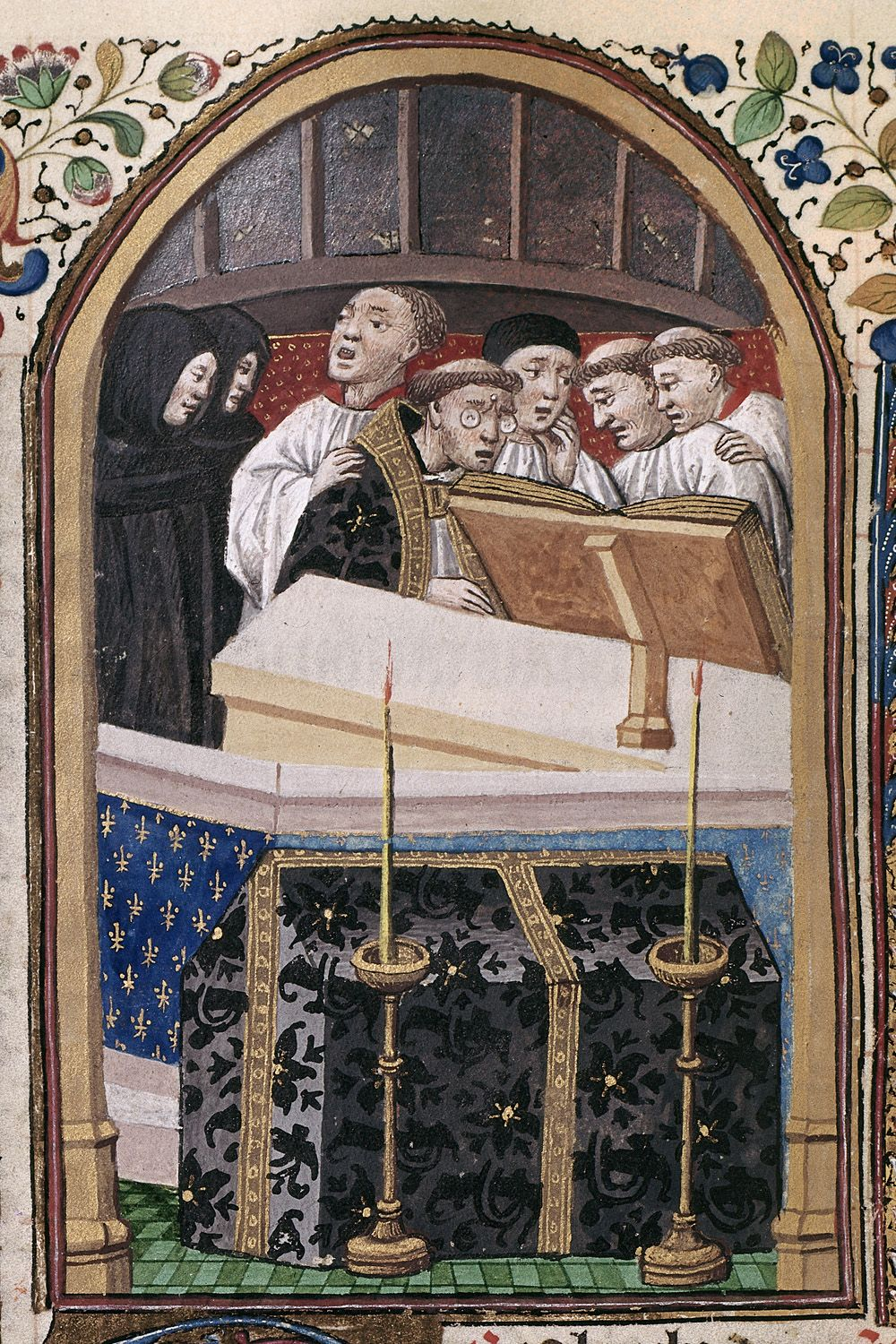

A cantor or chanter is a person who leads people in singing or sometimes in prayer. Cantor as a profession generally refers to those leading a Jewish congregation, although it also applies to the lead singer or choir director in Christian contexts. In formal Jewish worship, a cantor is a person who sings solo verses or passages to which the choir or congregation responds.

== Overview ==
The term itself is derived from the Latin for "singer", though it is frequently used to translate a range of equivalent terms in other languages such as for the leader of singing on a traditional chundan vallam or snake boat of Kerala.

== Role of the cantor ==
=== Judaism ===
In Judaism, a cantor sings and leads congregants in prayer in religious services. They are also sometimes called a hazzan or sheliah tzibur, which are the Hebrew terms for the role. They often come from a long line of cantors in their family; born with a natural gift of singing with extensive vocal range.

The role of professional cantor is especially central in Reform and Conservative Judaism, where they serve as clergy in their congregations. Reform Judaism and Conservative Judaism ordain cantors from seminaries. A cantor goes through years of extensive religious education, similar to that of a rabbi, in order to become officially recognized as such.

Orthodox Judaism only allows men to be cantors, though professional cantors are less common in Orthodox Judaism. Members of the congregation are usually given the honour of leading the congregation in prayer, without any formal training. Professional cantors are usually seen only in particularly large congregations or on special occasions, such as the High Holy Days.

Cantors in Sephardic communities are often called paytan, and they are increasingly hired for their role within Sephardi synagogues, rather than being a member of the community who takes on the role.

=== Islam ===
In Islam, the role of cantor is fulfilled by an ordained muezzin, who calls the adhan in Islam for prayer, that serves as clergy in their congregations and perform all ministerial rites as imams.

=== Christianity ===
A cantor in Christianity is an ecclesiastical officer that leads liturgical music. In some branches of Christianity, the lead cantor is called the precentor, and is assisted by a succentor. In the Lutheran Church, the Kantor is the chief musician in a particular parish or city, one notable example being Johann Sebastian Bach.

In the Greek Orthodox Church, the Protopsaltis is the cantor of the right choir, and the Lampadarios is the cantor of the left choir. Both must be familiar with Byzantine musical notation.

== See also ==
- Cantor in Reform Judaism
- Chant
- Jewish prayer
