= Kothukumukku railway bridge =

Disused bridge in Kerala, India

Coordinates: 9°01′39″N 76°32′12″E

Kothukumukku railway bridge is a disused bridge, formerly part of the defunct Karunagappaly - KMML Chavara railway line. The bridge, which has a single broad-gauge track, has now become a local tourist attraction. This bridge crosses Kannetty backwater.
