= Kannetty =

Kannetty കന്നേറ്റി
- Village
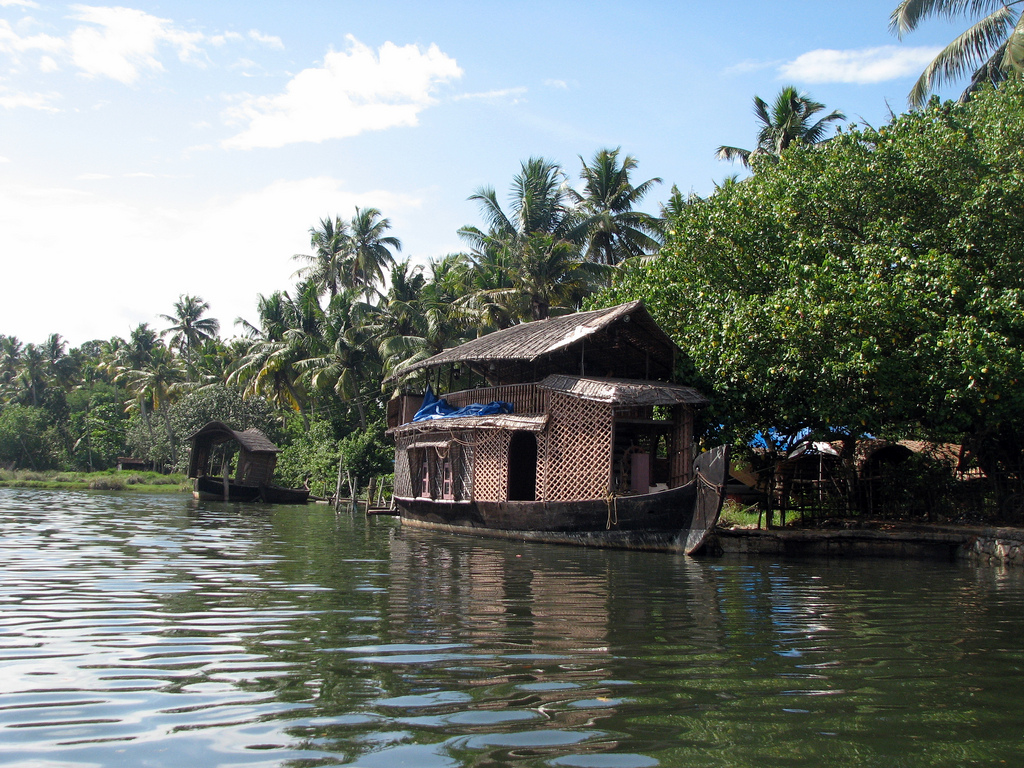
- Kannetty kayal

- Location in Kerala, India
- Coordinates: 9°3′16″N 76°32′7″E
- Country: India
- State: Kerala
- District: Kollam

Languages
  - Official: Malayalam, English
- Time zone: UTC+5:30 (IST)
- PIN: 690518
- Telephone code: +91 (0)4762
- ISO 3166 code: IN-KL
- Vehicle registration: KL-23
- Nearest city: Kollam (27 km) Karunagappally
- Sex ratio: 999 ♂/♀
- Literacy: 94.26%
- Climate: Am/Aw (Köppen)
- Avg. annual temperature: 27.2 °C (81.0 °F)
- Avg. summer temperature: 35 °C (95 °F)
- Avg. winter temperature: 24.4 °C (75.9 °F)

Kannetty is a village situated on the outskirts of Karunagappally, Kollam district, Kerala, India. Kannetty is famous for the Vallam kalis conducted in the backwater of the same name. Old Kothukumukku bridge is situated in Kannetty.

== Geography ==
The main geographic feature of the village is the backwater named Kannetty kayal. It is linked to National Waterway 3 by feeder canal. Several Vallam kalis are conducting in this backwater.

== Vallam kali ==
Sree Narayana trophy vallamkali is conducting in the Kannetty-kayal.

=== Sree Narayana Trophy Vallam kali ===
Sree Narayana Trophy Vallamkali is one of the main Vallam kali in Kerala is conducting annually on Chathayam day of Onam.

== Politics ==
Kannetty is a part of chavara legislative assembly and Kollam (Lok sabha constituency). Currently N.K Premachandran is serving as the Member of parliament of Kollam.

== Demographics ==
Malayalam is the native language of Parakode.

== See also ==
- Vallam Kali
- Kerala backwaters
- Astamudi lake
