= Ramapurathu Warrier =

Malayalam poet (1703–1753)

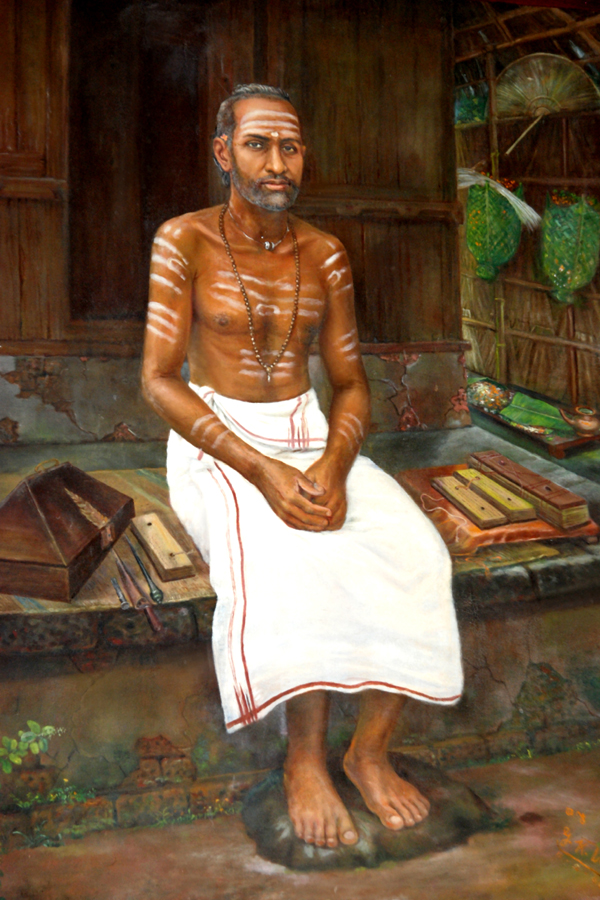
- Born: c. 1703; Ramapuram, Meenachil Thaluk, Kottayam district (now)
- Died: c. 1753; Ramapuram
- Writing career
- Language: Malayalam

Ramapurathu Warrier (1703–1753) is considered to be the pioneer of the "Vanchippattu" or Boat song form of poetry in Malayalam language. Vanchippattu is a poetic form of folk origin composed entirely in the Dravidian metre nathonnata. He was born in the year 1703 at Kottayam District, Kerala.

He was born in Ramapuram, near Palai, in Meenachil Taluk, Kottayam District (which was then ruled over by the Poonjar dynasty), Kerala. His real name was Sankaran. He was a courtier of two successive Kings of Travancore, viz. Marthanda Varma and Dharma Raja.

The most celebrated work of Ramapurathu Warrier is Kuchelavritham Vanchippattu, which depicts the story of Kuchela, a devotee and an old classmate of Krishna, going to Dwaraka to meet with him. Also he wrote the Kuchelavritham Vanchippattu in "Nathonatha" The poem was apparently composed and recited during one of the King Marthanda Varma's boat journeys in which Warrier was also present. While describing with great poignance the poverty of Kuchela and the benevolence of Krishna, Warrier was indirectly presenting his miseries before the King seeking the King's help. It was only when he returned home that he realized that instead of his ruined house another large house had been built on the instructions of Maharaja Marthanda Varma.

Although composed more than two centuries ago, the poem is still one of the most popular poems in the Malayalam language. An annotated edition was published by DC Books.
