= Indira Gandhi Boat Race =

Annual boat race in Kerala, India

The Indira Gandhi Boat Race takes place as a water-sports festival held every year. It is held in the backwaters of Cochin city of Kerala during the last week of December.

The trophy of this race was started in memory of Indira Gandhi, the late Prime Minister of India. What makes the race so unique is the sporting spirit of the contestants. Around 150, each of them representing a different village, vowed to follow strict rules during the game. Feeding them during practice sessions and on festival days is the responsibility of villagers or well-to-do people, who often, vow to bear the entire expense. Preparations for the Indira Gandhi Boat Race begin several weeks in advance.

Thousands of people crowd along the waters to cheer the participants of the boat race. Most of the races organized in Kerala have interesting legends behind how they originated. The snake boats are smeared with sardine oil for a smooth passage through the water. Usually, a snake boat is crewed by four helmsmen, 25 singers and 100 to 125 oarsmen, who row in unison to the fast rhythm of the Vanchipattu or the song of the boatman.
