= Chundan vallam =

Type of boat in Kerala, India

Chundan vallam ('beaked boat'), known outside Kerala as Kerala snake boats, are one of the icons of Kerala culture used in the Vallamkali or boat race.

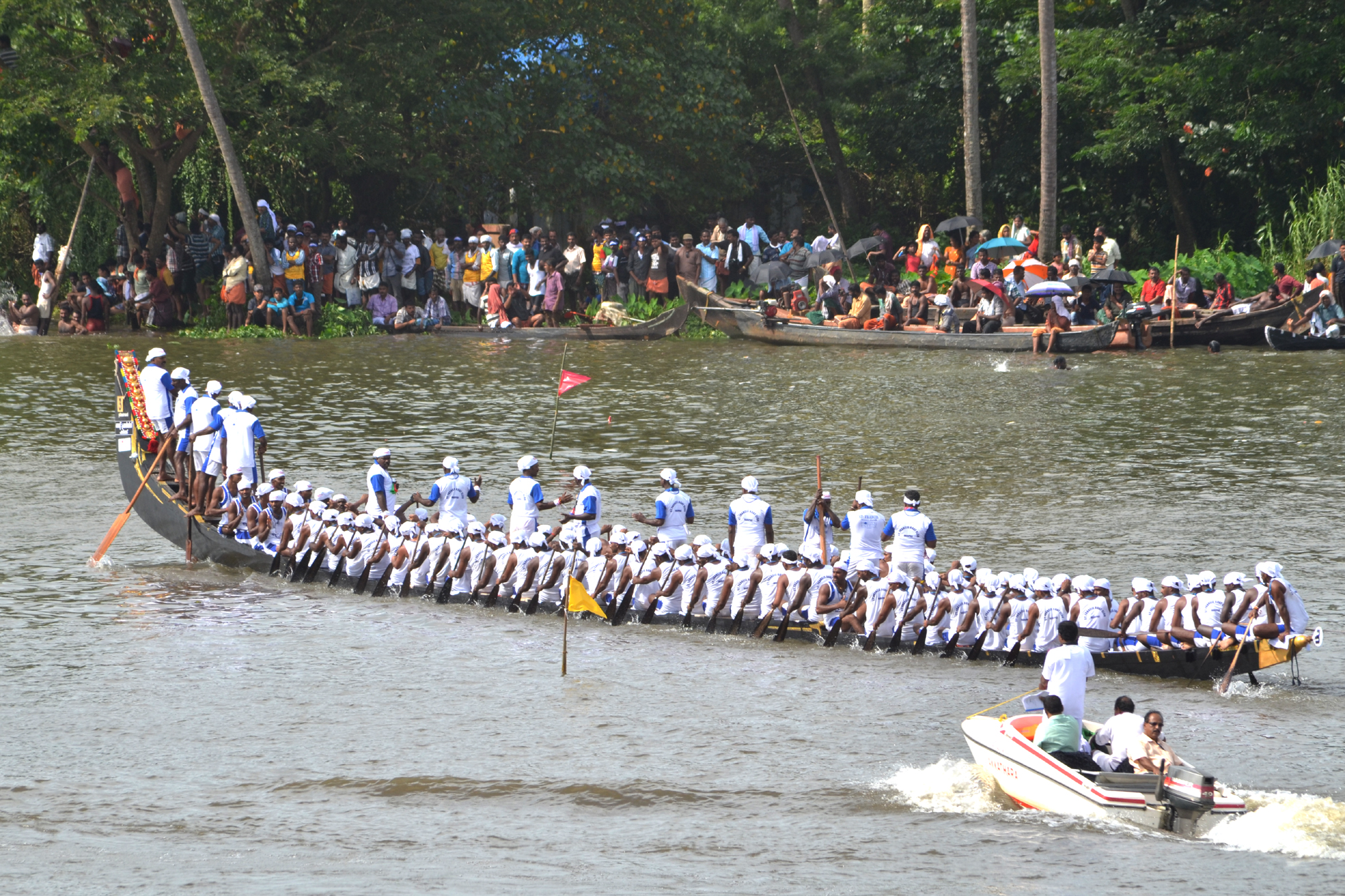
Snake boats during the Punnamada Nehru Trophy Boat Race

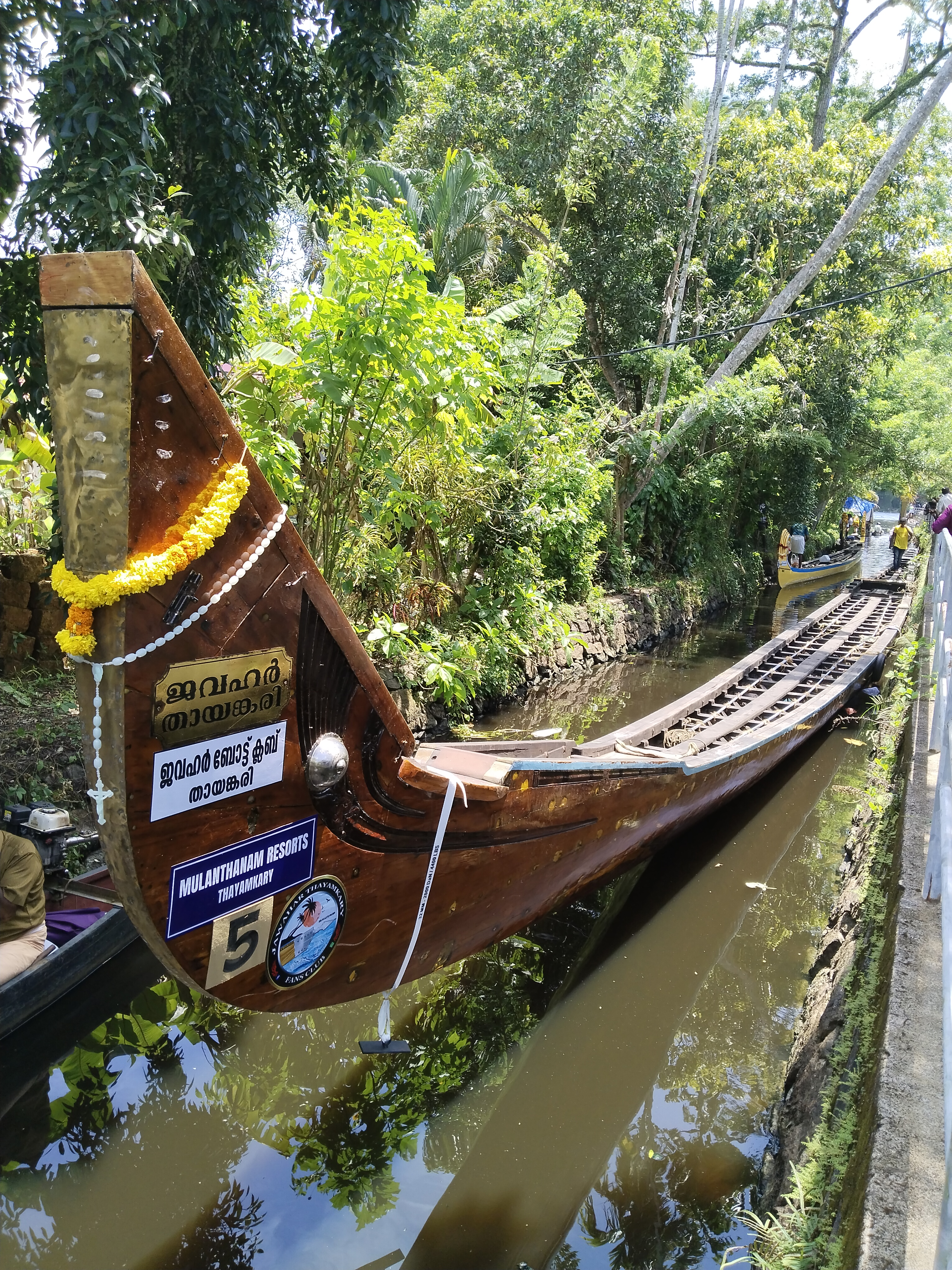
Snake Boat

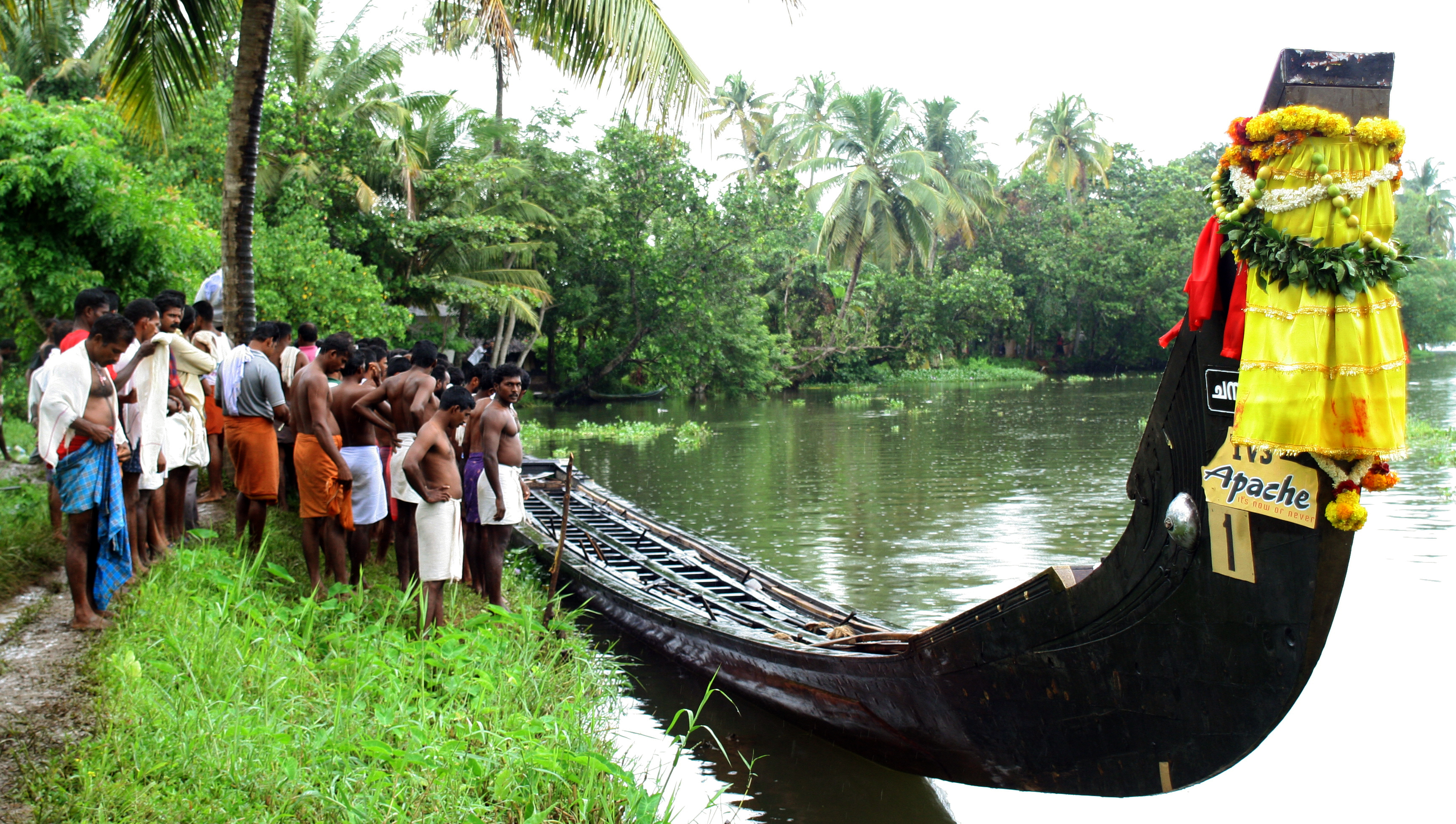
Preparing the snake boat

== Naval architecture ==
Constructed according to specifications taken from the Sthapatya Veda, an ancient treatise for the building of wooden boats, these boats vary from 100 to 138 feet in length. With the rear portion rising to a height of about 20 feet, and a long tapering front portion, it resembles a snake with its hood raised. Hulls are built of planks precisely 83 feet in length and six inches wide. The boats are a good example of ancient vishwakarma' prowess in naval architecture.

== Traditions and customs ==
Traditionally each boat belongs to a village, and the villagers worship that boat like a deity. Only men are allowed to touch the boat, and to show respect they should be barefooted. To make the boat slippery while in the water and to reduce absorption of water and thereby reduce the resistance of the hull, it is oiled with a mixture of fish oil, the ash of coconut shells, and eggs. Repair work is done annually by the village carpenter.

== Construction ==
Chundans are built of anjili (Artocarpus hirsutus), a wild jackfruit timber that resists rot in water. Hull planks run to about 80 feet (24 m). A master carpenter, the moothashari, directs the work. The planks are joined with traditional joints and iron bolts so that the long hull can flex without cracking, and a new boat takes several months to build. Building methods are passed on orally within families of professional boat makers and are guarded closely, since the boats are built to race against each other. Work begins on a day fixed as auspicious, and builders and race organisers say the proportions follow the Sthapathya Veda, a traditional treatise on construction.

Before each season the hull is dressed with a mixture of fish oil, coconut shell, carbon and eggs, which is held to keep the wood strong and the surface slick in the water. D'source, a design archive maintained by IIT Bombay, records the Parthasarathi Chundan as the oldest surviving boat of the type.

== Capacity and usage ==
Traditionally a boat will be commanded by a village leader (kaarnavan or karanaadhan) with first adanayampu, and under him there will be three main paddlers who control the movement of the boat with a 12-foot-long (3.7 m) main rudder-oar (adanayampu). Sitting two to a row along the length of the boat, there will be 64 paddlers, representing 64 art forms (or on occasion 128 paddlers). They row in rhythm of the vanchipattu ('boat[man's] song'). There will be around 25 singers in a row at the middle between the paddlers. In the middle of the second half of the boat is a platform for eight people to stand from where the cantor will lead the song. They represent the Ashtadikpalakas (Devas or gods who guard the eight directions).

== Cultural significance ==
A chundan belongs to a village or to the boat club that races it, and boats carry the names of their home villages: Karichal, Kavalam, Nadubhagam, Champakulam and others. Villagers hold religious ceremonies before a new boat enters the water, and by tradition only men of the village board it. Private clubs and sponsors now finance the building of new boats.

== History ==
In the early existence of Kerala, Snake boats were used as warships, but were later used in Vallam kali.

== See also ==
- Vallam kali
- Aranmula Boat Race
- Aranmula Kannadi
- Kallada Boat Race
- Dragon boat race
- Waka
- Swan boat (racing)
- Nouka Baich
- Champakkulam Chundan
