= Vanchippattu =

Poetic form in Malayalam

Vanchippattu is a poetic form in Malayalam composed entirely in the Dravidian metre Nathonnata. It is originated from Kerala, a state in India.

== History ==
This poetic form was created by Ramapurathu Warrier, a poet in Malayalam lived in Travancore (later became a part of Kerala) during the reign of the king Anizham Thirunal Marthanda Varma. It is believed that it was created during a boat travel of Ramapurathu Warrier along with the King Marthanda Varma. Warrier recited his poem to the king. This poem later became the famous poetic collection Kuchelavritham Vanchippattu.

== Etymology ==
The word Vanchippattu is a combination of two words vanchi means Boat and pattu means song. This poetic form has a rhythm similar to that of rowing the boat. Hence it got this name, according to historians.

== List of some famous Vanchippattu ==
- Kuchelavritham
- Lakshmanopadesham
- Parthasarathi Varnana
- Bheeshmaparvam
- Santhanagopalam
- Banayudham

== Famous Vanchippattu poets ==
- Vaaladisseri Sankaranarayanan Achari
- Champakulam Puthenpurayil Joseph
- I. C. Chacko
- Chirayinkeezhu Govindan Pillai
- Nedumprayar Gopalapilla Vaidyan

== See also ==
- Ramapurathu Warrier
