= Aranmula Boat Race =

Annual snake boat race in Kerala, India

Aranmula Boat Race Aranmula Vallam Kali
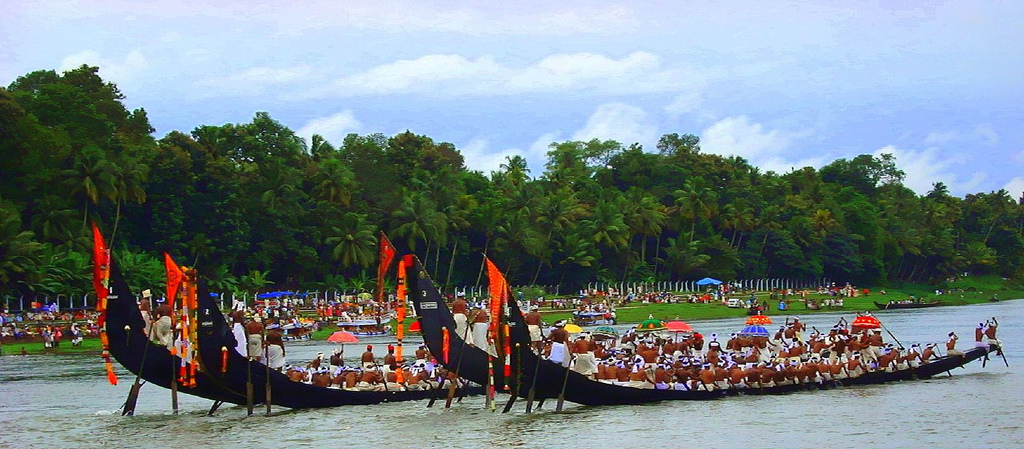
- Aranmula Uthrattathi Boat Race
- Status: Active
- Genre: Festival
- Date: Utthrattathi Nakshatra in the Malayalam Calendar month of Chingam (Aug/Sep accordingly)
- Frequency: Annually
- Venue: Pampa River, Aranmula Parthasarathy Temple
- Locations: Aranmula; Pathanamthitta District, Kerala
- Coordinates: 9°19′40″N 76°41′18″E
- Country: India
- Inaugurated: 1972
- Previous event: 15 September 2025
- Participants: 51
- Attendance: 51
- Organiser: Palliyoda Seva Sangham
- Website: aranmulavallamkali.com

The Aranmula Boat Race the oldest river boat festival in Kerala, the south western State of India is held during Onam (August–September). It takes place at Aranmula, near Sri Parthasarady Temple dedicated to Lord Krishna and Arjuna in Pathanamthitta district of Kerala State. The snake boats move in pairs to the rhythm of full-throated singing and shouting watched by an exciting crowd.

== Other boat races in Kerala ==
- President's Trophy Boat Race
- Champakulam Moolam Boat Race
- Nehru Trophy Boat Race
- Payippad Jalotsavam
- Kumarakom Boat Race
- Kallada Boat Race
- Gothuruth Boat Race since 1938, Ernakullam
