= Payippadu Vallam Kali =

Keralite festival

Payippad Boat Races, also known as Payippad Vallaarattu, or Jalotsavam, is a three-day water festival including the famous boat races, conducted in Payippad Lake, 6 km from Haripad of Kerala state in south India.

There is a close relation between this Payippadu Vallam Kali and Haripad Sree Subrahmanya Swamy temple.

== Winners ==
- 1967-Pacha Chundan, Payippad Boat Club
- 1968-Pacha Chundan, Payippad Boat Club
- 1969-no race was conducted

-Other race details are not available -

- 2004-Payippadan Chundan, Payippad Boat Club
- 2005-Karichal Chundan, Karichal Boat Club
- 2006-Karichal Chundan, Karichal Boat Club
- 2007-Karichal Chundan, Karichal Boat Club
- 2008-Karichal Chundan, Karichal Boat Club
- 2009-Payippadan Chundan, Payippad Boat Club
- 2010- no winners
- 2011-Karichal Chundan, Karichal Boat Club
- 2012-Anary Chundan, Anary Boat Club
- 2013-Anary Chundan, Anary Boat Club
- 2014-Karichal Chundan, Karichal Boat Club
- 2015-Payippadan Chundan, Payippad Boat Club
- 2016-Payippadan Chundan, Payippad Boat Club
- 2017-Payippadan Chundan, Payippad Boat Club
- 2018-cancelled due to flood
- 2019-Payippadan Chundan, Payippad Boat Club
- 2020-cancelled due to COVID-19
- 2021-cancelled due to COVID-19
- 2022 - Veeyapuram Chundan,Punnamada Boat Club(PBC)
- 2023 - Veeyapuram Chundan, Pallathuruthy Boat Club(PBC),Alappuzha
- 2024 - Karichal Chundan, Karichal Boat Club
- 2025 -Veeyapuram Chundan,Village Boat Club,Kainakary(VBC)
- 2026-Payippadan Chundan, Payipad Boat Club (Aroma bc)

== The legend ==
The people of the Haripad village decided to build a Sree Ayyappan temple in accordance with a vision that they should install the idol of Subrahmanya, which they would find in the Kayamkulam River under a whirlpool. Finding the idol, the people brought back Subrahmanya vigraha in a boat, escorted by the devotees in other boats ceremoniously. In remembrance of this event a three-day water festival is conducted each year.

The oldest temple was about 5000 years old. There was a "Skandakumara" idol was installed in the temple. So the place name became Kumara Puram. Even now some areas of Haripad is called Kumarapuram. At that time the temple was under control of some famous Ooranma families, those are Chengarappally, Thazhoor, Kizhikulam and 20 other Karanma families. These families decided to construct a new big temple. The 'Sreekovil' was constructed by Ambakkaattu Family of Karichal Village. At that time elder members of the Ooranma families saw a dream in same night. The dream was an idol of Subrahmanya with 4 hands (Chathurbahu) is lying in Govindamuttom Lake (Kayamkulam). People of these families rushed to the place in a boat (Palliyodam) to find out the idol. They found a whirlpool in the lake. Now the place is called Kandalloor (Kanda Nalla Ooru). After finding the idol (Vigrha), the people taken it to Nelppurakkadavu near Harippad in a boat, escorted by many boats (Palliyodam) rowed by the villages. In remembrance of this event a three-day water festival is conducted each year.

Payipad boat race is one of the oldest boat race in Kerala, to get an idea of that period adding some information of the rulers of that time. The golden period of the temple and the village was King Ravi Adithyan (Ravi kelan-2) period. At the time of King Marthanda Varma (in 1734), he added Kayamkulam and Chempakasseri to Travancore. This period Haripad temple's control also came under Travancore king. Updated by Gopakumar-Karichal..Book Ref:Harigeethapureshan)
