= President's Trophy Boat Race =

Boat race in Kerala, India

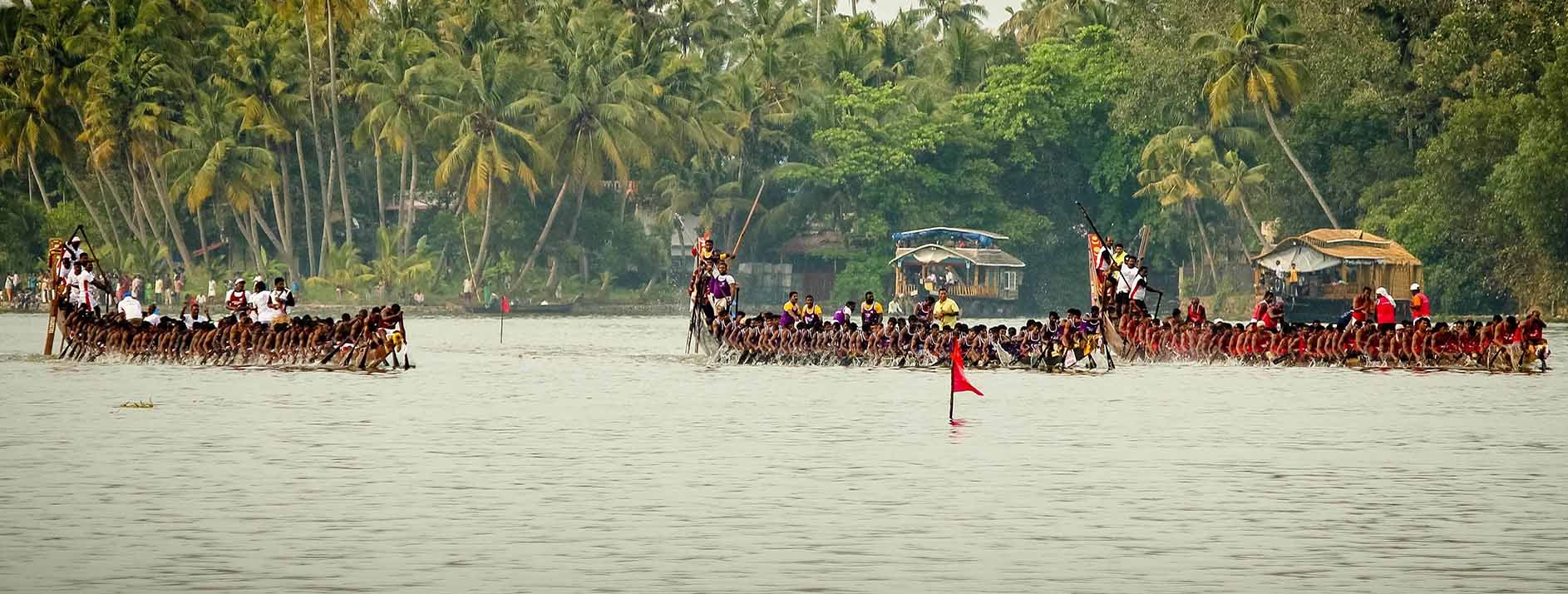

Event information
- Race area: Ashtamudi Lake, Kollam Kerala
- First race: 2011

The President's Trophy Boat Race is a popular boat race held on the Ashtamudi Lake in Kollam on 1 November every year. The day marks the birth of the Indian state of Kerala known as Kerala Piravi. This is the most popular of the races to be held during the season of the harvest festival, Onam, in autumn. There are races in five categories, namely Chundan Vallam (snake-boats), two grades of Veppu Vallam, and two grades of Iruttukuthi Vallam. Sixteen snake-boats compete in four heats. The trophy had been instituted in the name of the President of India who gives away the trophy and cash prize to the winning team. The race will become a part of Kerala's Indian Premier League-model boat race league from 2019 onward. The Government of Kerala is planning to make the President's Trophy Boat Race as the finishing event of Champions’ Boat League.

== About the event ==
The race takes place in Kollam along the Ashtamudi Lake, starting from the water column near Thevally Palace and finishing in front of the house boat terminal along a length of the river measuring 1,250 m (4,100 ft). As the oarsmen throw their oars in unison to the fast paced rhythm of the vanchipattu (Song of the Boatmen), the huge black crafts slice through the race course of Ashtamudi Lake to the finish.

=== Champions ===
Winners of the first edition of President's Trophy Boat Race - Sree Ganeshan Chundan(St. Francis Boat Club, Kollam).

The President of India, Pratibha Devisingh Patil inaugurated the first President's Trophy boat race. A gold-plated trophy and rupees 10 lakhs (10,00,000 or 1 million) INR cash award is also provided to the winner.

Year	Winners	Club	Captain
2011	Sree Ganesh Chundan	Saint Francis Boat Club	K Arun Kumar
2012	Jawahar Thayankari	Sangam Kannety	
2013	Karichal Chundan	Jesus Boat Club-Kollam	
2014	Anary	Kumarakam Town Boat Club	
2015	Not Conducted		
2016	Kattil Thekkethil	New Alapy Town Boat Club	
2017	St. Pious Xth	SFBC	
2018	Not Conducted		
2019	Nadubhagam	Pallathuruthy Boat club(PBC)	Narayanankutty
2020	Not Conducted		
2021	Not Conducted		
2022	Nadubhagam	NCDC	
2023	Veeyapuram	Pallathuruthi PBC	Allen and Aiden Moonnuthykkan
2024	Veeyapuram	Village Boat club Kainakari	Saju sebastin
2025	Niranam	Niranam Boat club	

== Patrons ==
- Chief Patron: Hon. Chief Minister of Kerala
- Chairman: District Collector of Kollam
- General Convener: District Magistrate of Kollam
- Mayor, Corporation of Kollam
