= Karthikappally =

- Village
- Karthikappally "Thodu" or Canal

- Location in Kerala, India Karthikappally (India)
- Coordinates: 9°15′37.2″N 76°26′59.3″E
- Country: India
- State: Kerala
- District: Alappuzha

Area
  - Total: 8.73 km^{2} (3.37 sq mi)

Population (2011)
  - Total: 19,021
  - Density: 2,180/km^{2} (5,640/sq mi)

Languages
  - Official: Malayalam, English
- Time zone: UTC+5:30 (IST)
- PIN: 690516
- Telephone code: 0479
- Vehicle registration: KL29
- Nearest city: Alapuzha
- Literacy: 88.61%
- Climate: Tropical monsoon (Köppen)
- Avg. summer temperature: 35 °C (95 °F)
- Avg. winter temperature: 20 °C (68 °F)
- Website: www.karthikappally.blogspot.com

Karthikappally is a village in Alappuzha district in the Indian state of Kerala. Haripad is the headquarter of Karthikappally Taluk. The taluk office is located in the revenue tower Haripad.

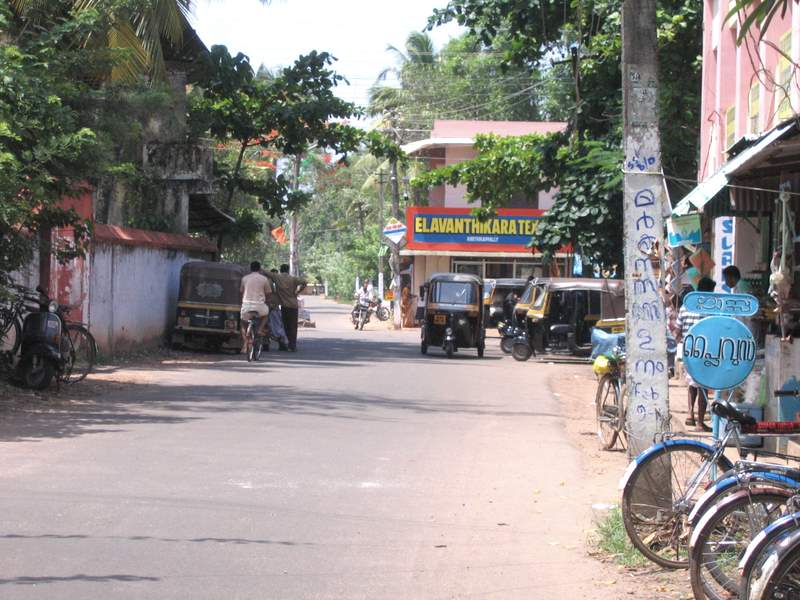
Karthikappally junction

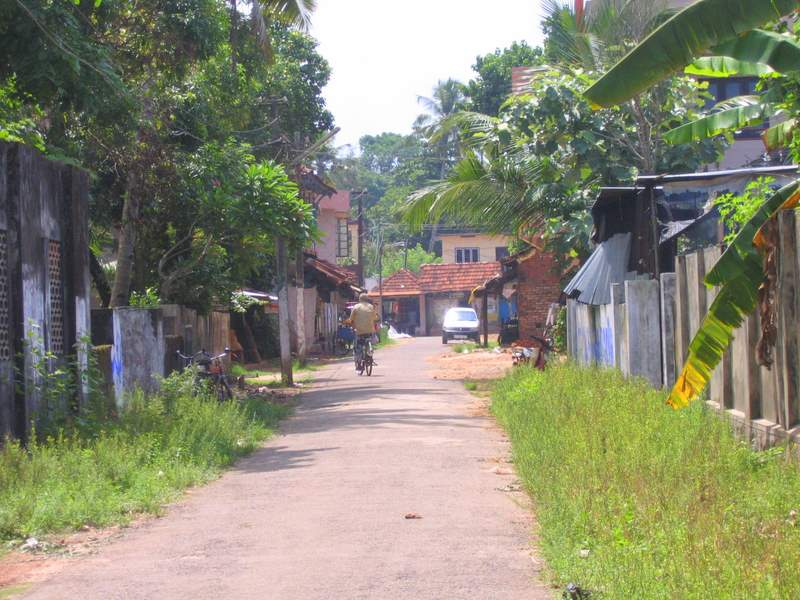
Karthikappaly street

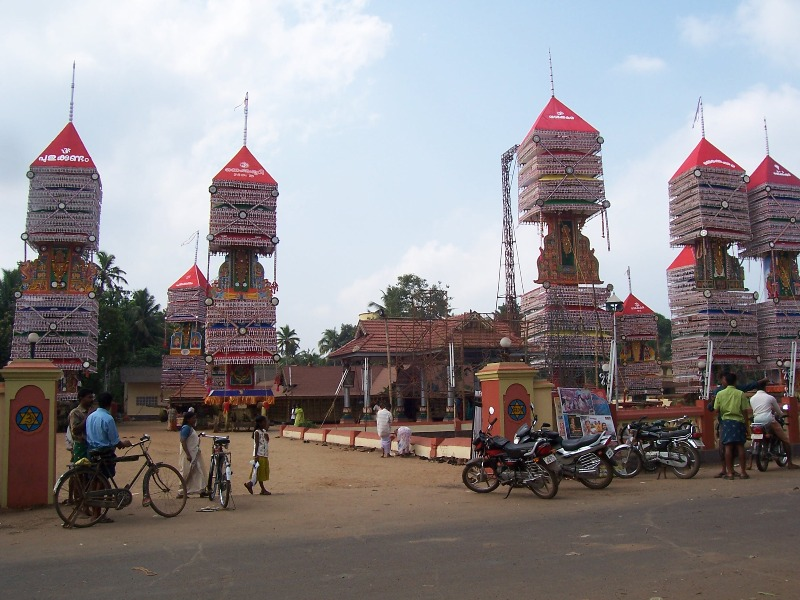
Valiyakulangara

Vathalloor Koikkal temple

== History ==
Karthikappally was once a Buddhist center. Between the years 904-933 King Marthanda Varma of Travancore added Karthikappally to Travancore. In 1742 and 1753 nearby places, namely Kayamkulam and Ambalapuzha, were added to the Karthikappally Natturajyam, making it a prominent region since then. The area between the now existing Purakkad and Kayamkulam was the once Karthikappally.

What made Karthikappally important was the proximity of an inland waterway or a Thodu which enabled free flow of traffic and allowed Karthikappally to become a trading center. The market was huge and crowded, remains of the old market exist to this day.

The Karthikappally Panchayat was formed later. Shri. K Damodaran was its first man in place. In 1912, the Govt. School in Mahadevikadu was constructed followed by The Govt. L P School in memory of Divan Krishnan Nair.

Notable people from Karthikappally include the only minister from Karthikappally and MLA Shri. A Achutan, Achutan Vakeel, A V Anandarajan, Kanikara Madhava Kurup, Krishnankutty Sir, Putathu Narayan—all fought for the freedom of the country.

== Villages of Karthikappally Taluk ==
1. Arattupuzha 2. Cheppad 3. Cheruthana 4. Chingoli 5. Haripad 6. Kandallor 7. Karthikappally 8. Karuvatta 9. Kayamkulam 10. Keerikkad 11. Krishnapuram 12. Kumarapuram 13. Muthukulam 14. Pallippad 15. Pathiyoor 16. Puthuppally 17. Thrikkunnapuzha 18.Veeyapuram

== Places ==
Haripad is the headquarters of Karthikappally taluk. Haripad municipality and Kayamkulam municipality belong to Karthikappally Taluk. Haripad Sree Subrahmanya Swamy Temple and Mannarasala Temple are famous pilgrimage sites near the village. Pandy is an island in Karthikapally taluk.

Many iconic landmarks were constructed in Karthikappally. Pithampil sree dharma sastha Temple, Pithampil Kottaram, The St. Thomas Orthodox Cathedral or the Kottakakatthu Suriyani Palli, Mar Thoma Church, St Mary's Catholic Church, Karumbali Koikkal Kottaram, Karthikappally Kottaram, Valiyakulangara Devi Temple, Kottaram Mudiyil Shri KrishnaSwami Kshetram, VathaloorKolical Kshetram, the Haripad Sree Subrahmanya Swamy Temple or Kshetram and the centuries-old mosques in Karthikappally are also famous. The Ananthapuram Kottaram is also famous. Mannarasala Temple is also famous.

St Thomas Orthodox Church (Kottakkakathu Old Syrian Church AD-829). is situated at the Karthikappally junction on the way to Thrikunappuzha. It is estimated that the church is more than 1200 years old. The exact year of construction is unknown. There are above 600 families in the parish.

Karthikappally St. Thomas Orthodox Cathedral is one of the ancient churches in Kerala. The church, established some thousand years before, is at Harippad. Karthikappally church keeps an immense archive of the local history in about 621 palmyra-written records. The church became the centre of attraction recently as two lithograph records and the remnants suspected to be that of a metropolitan were unearthed from the church premises. The lithographic stones have been identified to be 300 years old.

Cheppad is about 44 km north of Kollam on Kollam-Alappuzha National Highway 66. It has an Orthodox Syrian Christian Church dedicated to St. George built in 1300 AD, a place of pilgrimage for Orthodox Syrian Christians. The main portico and subsidiary porches are built after the traditional pattern of the porches of Hindu temple. The wood carvings in the porches and the mural paintings which depicts the great scenes of epic of Jesus Christ are unique and rare specimens. Mar Dionysius IV of the Malankara Orthodox Syrian Church (often called the Cheppad Metropolitan) is buried there. In 1956 Hailie Salassie, the Emperor of Ethiopia visited the church.

The wooden sculptures in the gopuram of Vettikkulangara Bhagavathy temple are famous.

== Demographics ==
As of 2011 India census, Karthikappally had a population of 19,021 with 8,912 males and 10,109 females.

== Education ==
St Thomas High School (1919) one of the oldest in the area which opened as a high school which is affiliated to Kerala State Education Board.

Karthikappally has privately owned and state owned educational institutions. Institutions of education are affiliated to either the Central Board for Secondary Education (CBSE), or the Kerala State Education Board.

Most private schools use English language as the medium of instruction whereas government run schools offer both English and Malayalam as a medium of instruction.

== See also ==
- Haripad Taluk Movement
- Haripad Assembly constituency
