= Haripad Assembly constituency =

Constituency of the Kerala legislative assembly in India

Haripad
- Constituency No. 107 for the Kerala Legislative Assembly

Constituency details
- Country: India
- Region: South India
- State: Kerala
- District: Alappuzha
- Lok Sabha constituency: Alappuzha
- Established: 1957
- Total electors: 1,86,282 (2026)
- Reservation: None

Member of Legislative Assembly
- 16th Kerala Legislative Assembly
- Incumbent Ramesh Chennithala
- Party: INC
- Alliance: UDF
- Elected year: 2026

Haripad State assembly constituency is one of the 140 state legislative assembly constituencies in Kerala in southern India. It is also one of the seven state legislative assembly constituencies included in Alappuzha Lok Sabha constituency. As of the 2026 assembly elections, the current MLA is Ramesh Chennithala of INC who is the Minister of Home Affairs, Vigilance and Coir.

== Local self-governed segments ==
Haripad Assembly constituency is composed of the following local self-governed segments:

Sl no.	Name	Status (Grama panchayat/Municipality)	Taluk
1	Haripad	Municipality	Karthikappally
2	Arattupuzha	Grama panchayat	Karthikappally
3	Cheppad	Grama panchayat	Karthikappally
4	Cheruthana	Grama panchayat	Karthikappally
5	Chingoli	Grama panchayat	Karthikappally
6	Karthikappally	Grama panchayat	Karthikappally
7	Karuvatta	Grama panchayat	Karthikappally
8	Kumarapuram	Grama panchayat	Karthikappally
9	Muthukulam	Grama panchayat	Karthikappally
10	Pallippad	Grama panchayat	Karthikappally
11	Thrikkunnapuzha	Grama panchayat	Karthikappally

== Members of Legislative Assembly ==
The following list contains all members of Kerala Legislative Assembly who have represented Haripad Assembly constituency during the period of various assemblies:

Election	Niyama Sabha	Member	Party	Tenure
1957	1st	Ramakrishna Pillai V.	Independent	1957 – 1960
1960	2nd	K. S. Krishna Pillai	Indian National Congress	1960 – 1965
1967	3rd	C. B. C. Warrier	Communist Party of India	1967 – 1970
1970	4th	C. B. C. Warrier	Communist Party of India	1970 – 1977
1977	5th	G. P. Mangalathu Madhom	Praja Socialist Party	1977 – 1980
1980	6th	C. B. C. Warrier	Communist Party of India	1980 – 1982
1982	7th	Ramesh Chennithala	Indian National Congress	1982 – 1987
1987	8th	Ramesh Chennithala	Indian National Congress	1987 – 1991
1991	9th	K. K. Sreenivasan	Indian National Congress	1991 – 1996
1996	10th	A. V. Thamarakshan	Revolutionary Socialist Party	1996 – 2001
2001	11th	T. K. Devakumar	Communist Party of India	2001 – 2006
2006	12th	Adv. B. Babuprasad	Indian National Congress	2006 – 2011
2011	13th	Ramesh Chennithala	Indian National Congress	2011 – 2016
2016	14th	Ramesh Chennithala	Indian National Congress	2016 – 2021
2021	15th	Ramesh Chennithala	Indian National Congress	2021 – 2026
2026	16th	Ramesh Chennithala	Indian National Congress	2026 – present

== Election results ==
Percentage change (±%) denotes the change in the number of votes from the immediate previous election.

=== 2026 ===
There were 1,86,282 registered voters in Haripad constituency for the 2026 Kerala legislative assembly election.

2026 Kerala Legislative Assembly election: Haripad
Party	Candidate	Votes	%	±%
INC	Ramesh Chennithala	68,184	47.08	▼1.23
CPI	T. T. Jismon	44,807	30.94	▼8.30
BJP	Sandeep Vachaspathi	31,022	21.42	▲9.62
NOTA	None of the above	465	0.32	▼0.04
SUCI(C)	Vidhya V.P	231	0.16	▲0.02
Independent	Soumya V. Sasidharan	69	0.05	−
Independent	Ramesh C	59	0.04	−
Margin of victory		23,377	16.14	▲7.06
Turnout		1,44,837	77.75	▲3.55
INC hold		Swing	▼1.23	

By Local body Segments
No.	Status (Local bodies)	Votes			Lead
No.	Status (Local bodies)	Ramesh Chennithala	T T Jismon	Sandeep Vachaspathi	Lead
1	Karuvatta	5,668	3,828	2,415	1,840
2	Kumarapuram	5,412	3,844	2,703	1,568
3	Cheruthana	4,833	3,394	2,173	1,439
4	Haripad Municipality	5,894	3,476	3,123	2,417
5	Pallippad	7,776	4,816	4,543	2,960
6	Karthikappally	3,130	1,689	1,911	1,219
7	Thrikkunnapuzha	9,609	6,353	3,315	3,256
8	Arattupuzha	8,429	6,087	2,289	2,342
9	Muthukulam	5,843	3,614	3,332	2,229
10	Chingoli	4,390	2,908	2,053	1,482
11	Cheppad	5,511	3,947	2,614	1,564
	Postal Ballot	1,689	851	551	838

|}

=== 2021 ===
There were 1,96,024 registered voters in Haripad Assembly constituency for the 2021 Kerala Assembly election.

2021 Kerala Legislative Assembly election: Haripad
Party	Candidate	Votes	%	±%
INC	Ramesh Chennithala	72,768	48.31%	▼2.74
CPI	Adv. R. Sajilal	59,102	39.24%	▲0.7
BJP	K. Soman	17,890	11.88%	▲3.16
NOTA	None of the above	536	0.36%	−
SUCI(C)	A. Muhammed	204	0.14%	▼0.04
Independent	Adv Niyaz Bharati	123	0.08%	
Margin of victory		13,666	9.07%	▼3.44
Turnout		1,96,024	74.20%	▼4.69
INC hold		Swing	▼2.74	

=== 2016 ===
There were 1,88,651 registered voters in Haripad Assembly constituency for the 2016 Kerala Assembly election.

2016 Kerala Legislative Assembly election: Haripad
Party	Candidate	Votes	%	±%
INC	Ramesh Chennithala	75,980	51.05%	▲1.02
CPI	P. Prasad	57,359	38.54%	▼7.39
BJP	D. Aswanidev	12,985	8.72%	▲6.38
PDP	Varkala Raj	623	0.42%	−
SDPI	Ashabul Haq	512	0.34%	▲0.10
BSP	C. Balakrishnan	417	0.28%	▲0.04
NOTA	None of the above	321	0.22%	−
Independent	Sidharthan Karuvatta	149	0.10%	
SUCI(C)	A. Muhammed	147	0.10%	▲0.13
Independent	Samudayathil Ravi R. Unnithan	93	0.06%	
Independent	Pradeep Karipuzha	87	0.06%	
Independent	Satheesh Kumar B.	75	0.05%	
Independent	D. Prasool Prakash	46	0.03%	
Independent	Prasad Unnikkanthara	38	0.03%	
Margin of victory		18,621	12.51%	▲8.41
Turnout		1,48,832	78.89%	▲0.51
INC hold		Swing	▲1.02	

=== 2011 ===
There were 1,71,834 registered voters in the constituency for the 2011 election.

2011 Kerala Legislative Assembly election: Haripad
Party	Candidate	Votes	%	±%
INC	Ramesh Chennithala	67,378	50.03%	
CPI	G. Krishnaprasad	61,858	45.93%	
BJP	Ajith Sankar	3,145	2.34%	
Independent	Rameshan	499	0.37%	
BSP	Somalal Babu	425	0.32%	
Independent	Krishnaprasad	339	0.25%	
SDPI	Venu	327	0.24%	
SUCI(C)	K. J. Sheela	305	0.23%	
Independent	Biju J.	233	0.17%	
Independent	N. Divakaran	171	0.13%	
Margin of victory		5,520	4.10%	
Turnout		1,34,680	78.38%	
INC hold		Swing		

=== 2006 ===
There were 1,44,188 registered voters in the constituency for the 2006 election.

2006 Kerala Legislative Assembly election: Haripad
Party	Candidate	Votes	%	±%
INC	Adv. B. Babu Prasad	53,787	48.86%	
CPI(M)	T. K. Devakumar	51,901	47.15%	
BJP	N. Chithragandhan	2,684	2.43%	
Independent	Rammohan	484	0.44%	
BSP	P. A. Shanavas	474	0.43%	
Independent	Sudhakaran Asari (Balakrishnan)	241	0.22%	
SUCI(C)	K. J. Sheela	425	0.39%	
Margin of victory		1,886	1.71%	
Turnout		1,10,075	76.34%	
INC gain from CPI(M)		Swing	yes	

=== 2001 ===
There were 1,58,829 registered voters in the constituency for the 2001 election.

2001 Kerala Legislative Assembly election: Haripad
Party	Candidate	Votes	%	±%
CPI(M)	T. K. Devakumar	59,439	50.1	
Revolutionary Socialist Party of Kerala	A. V. Thamarakshan	55,252	46.6	
Independent	E. N. Santhiraj	2,378	2.0	
JD(U)	Imam Boosari	960	0.8	
Independent	C. S. Jayakumar	580	0.5	
Margin of victory		4,187	3.5	
Turnout		1,18,641	74.7	
LDF hold		Swing		

=== 1996 ===
There were 1,50,351 registered voters in the constituency for the 1996 election.

1996 Kerala Legislative Assembly election: Haripad
Party	Candidate	Votes	%	±%
RSP	A. V. Thamarakshan	54,055	50.26	
INC	N. Mohan Kumar	46,837	43.55	
BJP	T. S. Girish Kumar	2,952	2.74	
Independent	Udayan Kesavan	714	0.66	
PDP	M. Iqbal	606	0.56	
Independent	V. Ramakrishnan	432	0.40	
Independent	A. Ramachandran	410	0.38	
Independent	B. Bhadran	351	0.33	
Independent	H. C. V. Sudhakaranachari	343	0.32	
Independent	A. K. Raju	305	0.28	
Independent	Shaji Karthikeyan	203	0.19	
Independent	Premjith Yasodharan	193	0.18	
Independent	G. Rajeev Kumar	144	0.13	
Rejected	Rejected & Missing Votes	2,862		
Margin of victory		7,218	6.71	
Turnout		1,10,407	73.43	
RSP gain from INC		Swing		

== See also ==
- Haripad
- Alappuzha district
- List of constituencies of the Kerala Legislative Assembly
- 2016 Kerala Legislative Assembly election
