= Chingoli =

Village in Kerala, India

Chingoli is a village in Karthikappally taluk, Alappuzha district of Kerala, India.

== How to visit ==
Chingoli can be accessed by road and rail. Chingoli is accessible by the Kayamkulam - Muthukulam - Danapady road. The nearest major bus station, Haripad, is around 4–5 km away whereas the nearest railway station, Haripad railway station, is at a distance of 5 km.

For visitors from outside the state, Cochin airport (117 km), Thiruvananthapuram Airport (116 km) and Alappuzha railway station (35 km) are the nearest major points of access.

== Places of interest ==
Chingoli village is close to many famous Hindu temples among which Mannarasala Nagaraja temple, Haripad Sri Subramanya temple, Evoor temple, Kanjoor Sree Durga Devi temple, Vettikulangara Devi Temple are the most famous. The Kavillpadikkal temple, Mariyamman temple and Sree Bhuvaneswari devi temple are among the most famous temples in the village and a source of strength to its inhabitants.

== Industry ==
- The NTPC Kayamkulam power station lies near Chingoli and has boosted the economy of the region considerably.
- Sree Rama krishna pharmacy and Krishnendu Ayurveda hospital established in 1908 known as Chingoli ayurveda hospital attracts Indians and foreigners for ayurveda treatments.
- Lakshmi Engineering Industries established in the late 1990s. They are manufacturers of wet grinders, laundry washing machines, coconut scrapers, vegetable cutters, atta kneading machines, incinerators etc.

== Notable people ==
- Ashokan

== Climate ==
Chingoli has a typical tropical climate just like the rest of Kerala. Summers can be rather uncomfortable due to high humidity levels.

== Nearby places ==
Chingoli lies near Muthukulam, Cheppad, Kayamkulam, Mavelikara and Karuvatta.
