= Ashokan (actor) =

Indian actor

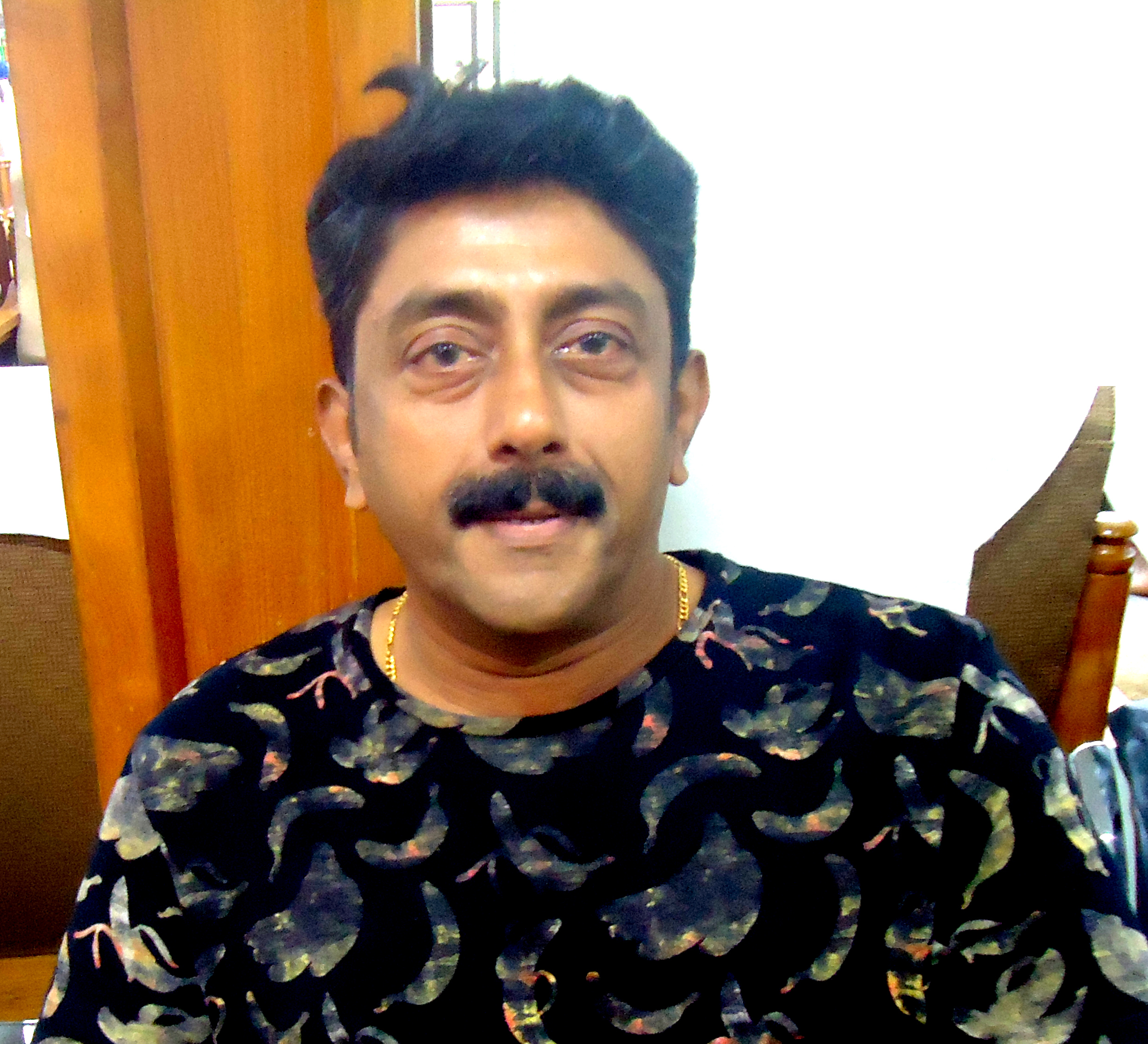
- Born: 23 May 1961 (age 65); Chingoli, Haripad, Kerala, India
- Occupation: actor
- Years active: 1979–present
- Spouse: Sreeja
- Children: 1

Ashokan is an Indian actor known for his roles in Malayalam films. He made his film debut with Peruvazhiyambalam which won the 1979 National Film Award for Best Feature Film. He is best known for his roles in Yavanika (1982), Yuvajanotsavam (1986), Thoovanathumbikal (1987), Moonnam Pakkam (1988), In Harihar Nagar (1990), Amaram (1991), 2 Harihar Nagar (2009), and In Ghost House Inn (2010).

== Career ==
He made his debut in 1979 with Peruvazhiyambalam, directed by Padmarajan, in which he played a 15-year-old boy who becomes a fugitive after killing a bully. This was followed by roles in Padmarajan's films Arappatta Kettiya Gramathil (1986), Thoovanathumbikal (1987) and Moonnam Pakkam (1988). He had the lead role in Anantaram, directed by Adoor Gopalakrishnan.

== Personal life ==
Ashokan was born as the youngest of four children to (both late) Samudayathil N. P. Unnithan and Azhakath Savithri Kunjamma on 23 May 1961 at Chingoli, Haripad. His father was a public prosecutor with the CBI and his mother was a housewife. He lost his father when he was young and was brought up by his mother. Ashokan completed his basic education at Chingoli L.P. School, Chingoli, Upper Primary Education completed in PMDUPS, Cheppad, and High School at St. Thomas H. S. Karthikapally. He graduated in arts from T. K. Madhava Memorial College, Nangiarkulangara, Haripad. He was studying for his pre-degree first year when he was offered a role in Peruvazhiyambalam.

He is married to Sreeja and has a daughter, Karthiyayani. They currently reside in Chennai.

== Filmography ==
=== 1970s ===
Year	Title	Role	Notes
1979	Peruvazhiyambalam	Raman/Mani	
1979	Avano Atho Avalo		

=== 1980s ===
Year	Title	Role	Notes
1981	Oridathoru Phayalvaan	Kannan	
1982	Idavela	John Thomas	
1982	Yavanika	Vishnu	
1984	Oru Kochukatha Aarum Parayatha Katha	Gopi	
1984	Mukhamukham	Sudhakaran	
1984	Aduthaduthu	Jeevan Philip	
1984	Aattuvanchi Ulanjappol	Janardanan	
1984	Unaroo		
1985	Thinkalazhcha Nalla Divasam	Venu	
1985	Eeran Sandhya	Ashokan	
1985	Scene No 7		
1985	Thozhil Allengil Jail		
1985	Gaayathridevi Ente Amma	Thomachan	
1985	Irakal	Raghavan	
1986	Yuvajanotsavam	Jacob Zakharia	
1986	Abhayam Thedi	Anil	
1986	Arappatta Kettiya Gramathil	Hilal	
1986	Gandhinagar 2nd Street	Tomy	
1986	Chilambu	Raamu	
1986	Pranamam	Damu	
1986	Sayam Sandhya	Narendran	
1986	Icecream		
1987	Idanazhiyil Oru Kaalocha	Vincent Vattoly	
1987	Vilambaram	Basheer	
1987	Thoovanathumbikal	Rishi	
1987	Oru Maymasappularayil	Cricket Star	
1987	Jaalakam	Appu	
1987	Anantaram	Ajayan	
1987	Ellavarkkum Nanmakal		
1987	Ponnu		
1988	Vaishali	Chandrangadan	
1988	Moonnam Pakkam	Ranjith Menon	
1988	Mrithyunjayam	Sunny	
1988	Janmandharam	Hari	
1988	Oru Vivaada Vishayam		
1988	Sangham		
1988	Arjun Dennis		
1988	New Delhi		Hindi film
1988	Thaala		
1988	David David Mr. David	David (Jayan)	
1989	Season	Porinchu	
1989	Ashokante Ashwathykuttikku		
1989	Swagatham	Tito Francis	
1989	Rugmini		

=== 1990s ===
Year	Title	Role	Notes
1990	In Harihar Nagar	Thomaskutty	
1990	No.20 Madras Mail	Sunil / Suresh	
1990	Samrajyam	Anil	
1991	Aavanikunnile Kinnaripookkal	Ajayan	
1991	Amina Tailors	Azeez	
1991	Ulladakkam	Kishore	
1991	Mimics Parade	Jimmy	
1991	Kizhakkunarum Pakshi	Anandhu's Friend	
1991	Arangu	Unni Viswanath	
1991	Apoorvam Chilar	Bobby Punnoose	
1991	Amaram	Raghavan	
1992	Thalastaanam	Pappan	
1992	Neelakurukkan		
1992	Kasarkode Khaderbai	Jimmy	
1992	Nakshthrakoodaram	Manoharan	
1992	Kallan Kappalil Thanne	Premchandran	
1992	Mahanagaram	Ummerkutti	
1993	Samagamam	Joy	
1993	Savidham	Shivadasa Menon	
1993	Ponnuchami	Rajappan	
1993	O' Faby		
1993	Kulapathy		
1994	Kudumba Visesham	Uthaman	
1994	Chief Minister K. R. Gowthami	Santhosh	
1995	Samudhayam		
1995	Spadikam	Jerry	
1995	Sasinas	Vaikom Muhammad Basheer	
1996	Dominic Presentation	James	
1996	Moonilonnu	Venugopal	
1996	Ishtamanu Nooru Vattam	Siddique Shameer	
1997	Manthramothiram	Prasad	
1997	Sundarakilladi	Bhuvanappan	
1999	Crime File	Seemon	
1999	Aayiram Meni	Damu	

=== 2000s ===
Year	Title	Role	Notes
2001	Nariman	K. Ravikumar	
2001	Jyothirgamaya		
2001	Andolanam		
2002	Krishna Gopalakrishna	Peter	
2002	Suvarna Mohangal	Sekharankutty	
2003	Parinamam	Satheesan	
2003	Mullavalliyum Thenmavum	Chinnarangan	
2003	Vellithira	Gopu	
2005	Police	Saji Allen	
2007	Romeoo	Subramanian	
2007	Hello	Sebastian	
2007	Nagaram	Stephen	
2007	Ottakkayyan	Mr. B	
2008	Swarnam		
2008	Oru Pennum Randaanum		
2008	Ayudham	Hari	
2009	2 Harihar Nagar	Thomaskutty	
2009	Calendar	Punyalan	
2009	Vairam: Fight for Justice	Thalikkulam George Kutty	

=== 2010s ===
Year	Title	Role	Notes
2010	In Ghost House Inn	Thomaskutty	
2010	Paappi Appacha	Shashankan Muthalali	
2010	Again Kasargod Khader Bhai	Jimmy	
2010	Advocate Lakshmanan – Ladies Only	Thomas George	
2010	April Fool	Vishwanath	
2011	Three Kings	Ashok Varma	
2011	Teja Bhai and Family	Gopan	
2011	Sarkar Colony	Mukundan	
2011	Melvilasom	Dr. Gupta	
2011	Kottarathil Kutty Bhootham		
2011	The Filmstaar	S Aravindan	
2011	Mohabbath	Nissar	
2011	Innanu Aa Kalyanam	Krishnakutty	
2012	Kalikaalam	Ravi Nair	
2012	Banking Hours 10 to 4	Salman Azharudeen	
2012	Mullamottum Munthiricharum	Thomichan	
2012	Namukku Parkkan	K.K.	
2012	Josettante Hero	Ravi Prakash	
2012	Karmayogi		
2012	Kunjaliyan	Viswan	
2013	Annum Innum Ennum	Thomas	
2013	Mizhi	Santhosh	
2013	Crocodile Love Story	Narayanan Namboothiri	
2013	Nadodimannan	Vinayachandran	
2013	Weeping Boy	Issac	
2013	Entry	Thampi	
2014	Mizhi Thurakku		
2014	Village Guys		
2014	Manja	Prasad	
2015	Nirnayakam	Adv. Shafeer	
2015	Two Countries	Mukundan	
2015	John Honai	Johny Valookkaran	
2016	Pa Va	Chackochan	
2017	Vimaanam		
2017	Careful	CI Purushothaman	
2017	Ramaleela	S. P. Balachandran	
2017	Pokkiri Simon	H C Yesudas	
2018	Panchavarnathatha	Udayan	
2019	Mikhael	Antony	
2019	Oru Yamandan Premakadha	Kushumban Johnny	
2019	Ittymaani: Made in China	Dr. Asif Mooppan	
2019	Jack & Daniel	S.I Hari	

=== 2020s ===
Year	Title	Role	Notes
2020	Kalamanadalam Hyderali	Kalamandalam Shankaran Embrathiri	
2021	Kaattinarike	Johnny	
2023	Nanpakal Nerathu Mayakkam	Tourist	
2023	Ntikkakkakkoru Premondarnn	Abdulkhadar	
2023	Masterpeace	Kuriyachan	Disney+ Hotstar Web series
2024	Perilloor Premier League	Keman Soman	Disney+ Hotstar Web series
2024	Jai Ganesh	Ganeshan's father	
2024	Jamalinte Punjiri		
2024	Paalum Pazhavum	Raghavan	
2024	Kishkindha Kaandam	Sivadasan	
2024	Oru Anweshanathinte Thudakkam	DGP Thomas Koshi IPS	
2025	Dheeran	Kunjan	
2025	Thalavara	Kannappan	
2025	Eko	Appootty	
2025	Adinaasam Vellapokkam	Principal's husband	
2025	Bha. Bha. Ba.	Sivankutty	
2026	I, Nobody		
2026	Udumbanchola Vision		
2026	Pathira Kurukkan †	TBA	

== Television ==
=== Serials ===
Tamil

- Salanam (Vijay TV)

Malayalam

- Sangeethika (Doordarshan)
- Ragamritham (doordarshan)
- Jwala (Doordarshan)
- Yudham(Doordarshan)
- Samayam (Asianet)
- Valayam (Doordarshan)
- Sathi (Doordarshan)
- Kadamattathu Kathanar (Asianet)
- Mahathma Gandhi colony (Surya TV)
- Thali (Surya TV)
- Sreeguruvayoorappan (Surya TV)
- Devimahathmyam (Asianet)
- CBI Diary (Mazhavil Manorama)

=== Reality Shows as Judge ===
Malayalam

- Comedy Utsavam
- Urvasi Theaters
