= Valiyakulangara Devi Temple =

Hindu temple in Alappuzha district, Kerala

- Valiyakulangara Devi Temple, Mahadevikadu, Karthikappally, Alappuzha, Kerala

Religion
- Affiliation: Hinduism
- District: Alappuzha
- Deity: Bhadrakali
- Festivals: Aswathi festival, Kettukazhcha (Kumbha Bharani)

Location
- Location: Mahadevikadu, Karthikappally
- State: Kerala
- Country: India
- Interactive map of Valiyakulangara Devi Temple
- Coordinates: 9°15′32″N 76°26′17″E

Architecture
- Type: Architecture of Kerala

Specifications
- Temple: One
- Elevation: 26.93 m (88 ft)

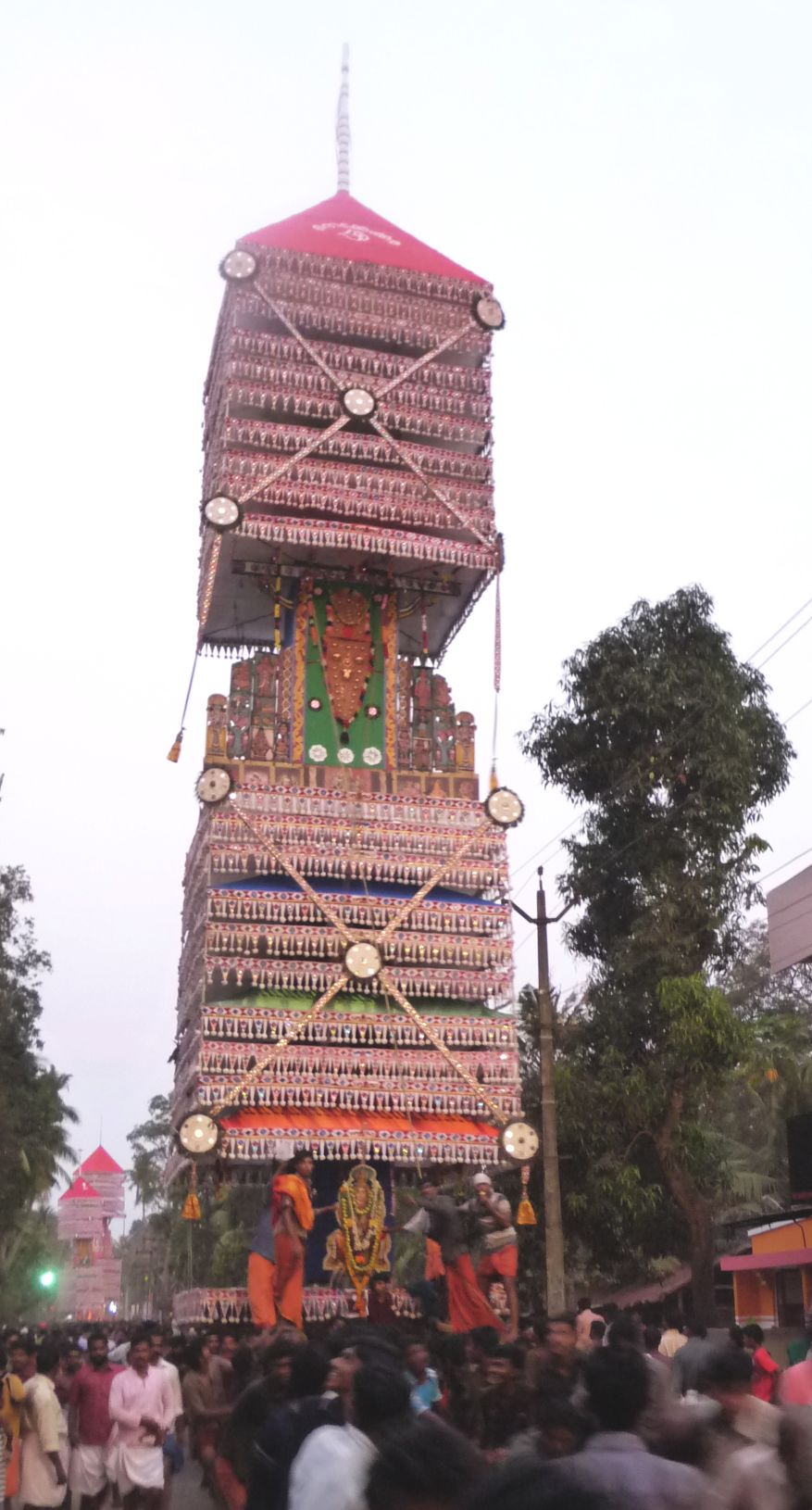
One of the kettukazhcha's at Aswathi festival

Valiyakulangara Devi Temple is situated at Mahadevikadu village, in Karthikappally neighbourhood of Alappuzha district Nangyarkulangara in Kerala and is located about 4 km from Haripad and 3 km from Thrikkunnappuzha. It is located 3 km from the National Waterway-3 as well as from the National Highway-47.

The major festival is the Aswathi festival in Feb-March, famous for the Fireworks show and the Ketukazhcha (procession of chariots).

'Kettukazhcha' displays sculpted and decorated forms of six temple cars known as 'Kuthiras', five 'rathas' (chariots) and icons of Bhima and Hanuman.

== See also ==
- Temples of Kerala
