= Nangiarkulangara =

- town
- Location in Kerala, India
- Coordinates: 9°15′30″N 76°27′45″E
- Country: India
- State: Kerala
- District: Alappuzha

Languages
  - Official: Malayalam, English
- Time zone: UTC+5:30 (IST)
- Vehicle registration: KL-04,29

Nangiarkulangara is a relatively small town situated near Haripad, Alappuzha district in the state of Kerala, India. The area postal pin code is 690513.

Nangiarkulangara is the satellite town of Haripad city and part of Haripad Municipality. Nangiarkulangara is the central point of three major towns in central Travancore. Roads from Haripad, Mavelikara, Thrikkunnappuzha and Kayamkulam meet at this pivot point. It is also known for the Sri Krishna temple which is in the centre of the town. The national highway NH 66 passes through this town.

NTPC Limited, whoseCombined Cycle Power Plant is located at nearby Choolatheruvu, has a portion of its township at Nangiarkulangara, very close to NH 47. In fact, originally, this was the temporary township, when the main township, named Shaktipuram, closer to the power plant, was under construction during 1998-2000.

Major routes are Nangiarkulangara Junction-Mavelikara-Charumoodu-Chakkuvally-Puthiyakavu, Puthiyakavu Junction-Chakkuvally-Charumoodu- Mavelikara-Thattarambalam-Nangiarkulangara Junction and Oachira-Choonadu- Mavelikara-Thattarambalam-Nangiarkulangara Junction.

== Education ==
Nangiarkulangara is notable for its educational institutions, including the T.K. Madhava Memorial College which has graduate and post-graduate courses. The Bethany Girls School and its CBSE school is also in the area Bethany Central school.

== Religion ==
Nangiakulangra also has the Major Sreekrisha temple under Travancore Dewasom board.

== Movie References ==
Nangiakulangra is also mentioned in the storyline of the movie Param Sundari(2025), though it is not clear if the shooting took place here.
