= C. S. Sujatha =

Indian politician

- സി. എസ്. സുജാത
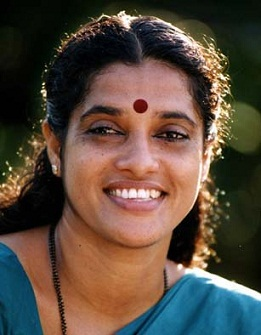

Member of Parliament, Lok Sabha
- In office 13 May 2004 – 16 May 2009
- Preceded by: Ramesh Chennithala
- Succeeded by: Kodikunnil Suresh
- Constituency: Mavelikara

Personal details
- Born: 28 May 1965 (age 61) Vallikunnam, Alappuzha, Kerala, India
- Party: Communist Party of India (Marxist)
- Parents: P. Ramachandran Nair; Sumathy Pillai

C. S. Sujatha (born 28 May 1965) is an Indian politician who was a Member of Parliament of the 14th Lok Sabha of India. She represented the Mavelikara constituency of Kerala. She is a member of the Communist Party of India (Marxist).

== Political career ==
She became the District Panchayat President of Alappuzha in 1995 at the age of 29. She remained in the position until 2004. In 2004, Sujatha defeated Ramesh Chennithala by a margin of 7,414 votes in the Mavelikara constituency. Sujatha is the first CPI(M) candidate who has contested the elections in the party symbol to win from Mavelikara, which is considered to be a traditional UDF stronghold. She is also the first woman to represent Mavelikara in the Lok Sabha. She is now selected as CC Member of CPI(M).

She was the CPI(M) candidate for the assembly election on 13 April 2011 at Chengannur constituency.

== Positions held ==
2004: Elected to 14th Lok Sabha Member, Committee on Labour Member, Committee on Empowerment of women
2006-onwards Member, Committee on Empowerment of Women
2007 onwards Member, Standing Committee on Labour
1995-2004 President, District Panchayat, Alappuzha
1987-1990 Member (i) Senate, Kerala University
1988-1990 Syndicate, Kerala University
1998-2004 Central Committee, AIDWA
1990-1993 District Council
