= C. B. C. Warrier =

Indian politician

Member of Kerala Legislative Assembly
- In office 1967–1977
- Preceded by: K. S. Krishna Pillai
- Succeeded by: G. P. Mangalathu Madhom
- Constituency: Haripad
- In office 1980–1982
- Preceded by: G. P. Mangalathu Madhom
- Succeeded by: Ramesh Chennithala
- Constituency: Haripad

Personal details
- Born: 30 October 1932 Haripad, Alleppey, Kerala, India
- Died: 7 June 2013 (aged 80) Hosur, Tamil Nadu, India
- Party: Communist Party of India (M)

Chembakasseril Balakrishna Warrier Chandrasekhara Warrier (30 October 1932 – 17 June 2013) was an Indian political leader of the Communist Party of India (Marxist) and a member of Kerala Legislative Assembly for 12 years. Known to the political circle as CBC, he was elected as a Member of Legislative Assembly in 4th and 6th term of Kerala State Legislative Assembly. He also had held positions of Chairman, Public Accounts Committee (1974–75) and Committee on Estimates (1980–82). He was also active in trade union movements.

== Early life ==
He was born 30 October 1932, in Haripad, Alleppey, Kerala, India. He completed his schooling in Karuvatta NSS school, Haripad in 1947. Pre-university studies he completed in Trivandrum and he continued his higher studies at University College Trivandrum. During this period he was active in students movements and union elections in college.

== Educational qualifications ==
Bachelor of Law (BL), Advocate

== Positions held ==
- MLA Kerala Legislative Assembly (1967-1970)
- MLA, Kerala Legislative Assembly (1970–77 and 1980–85)
- CPI(M) Parliamentary Party Secretary (1970–77)
- Member, Kerala University Senate
- C.I.T.U Working Committee, CPI (M) Alleppey District Committee
- President, Employees Unions of KFC, KSFE
- Agro Industries Corporation and other Trade Unions.

== Election profile ==
=== Won ===
- 1970 Kerala Legislative Assembly Election - Won against Congress(I) candidate Thachadi Prabhakaran
- 1980 Kerala Legislative Assembly Election - Won against Congress (I) candidate G. P. Mangalathu Madam

=== Lost ===
- 1965 Kerala Legislative Assembly Election - Defeated by Congress(I) candidate K. P. Ramakrishnan Nair
- 1977 Kerala Legislative Assembly Election - Defeated by Congress(I) candidate G. P. Mangalathu Madam
