= Karuvatta =

- Village
- Location within Kerala
- Coordinates: 9°19′0″N 76°24′0″E
- Country: India
- State: Kerala
- District: Alappuzha District

Languages
  - Official: Malayalam, English
- Time zone: UTC+5:30 (IST)
- PIN: 690517, 690554
- Telephone code: 91479-
- Vehicle registration: KL- 29
- Nearest city: Alappuzha
- Lok Sabha constituency: Alappuzha
- Climate: Tropical monsoon (Köppen)
- Avg. summer temperature: 35 °C (95 °F)
- Avg. winter temperature: 20 °C (68 °F)

Karuvatta is a village in the Alappuzha District of the Kerala region of India. It lies between Haripad and Thottappally in Alappuzha, on National Highway 66. Karuvatta has a railway station, and the nearest airports are Trivandrum International Airport and Cochin International Airport.

== Places to visit ==
There are many paddy fields, coconut lagoons, and backwaters around Karuvatta. The nearest beach to Karuvatta is Thottappally. The indescribable beauty of this beach attracts millions of people every year. The Pampa and Achenkovil rivers reach directly to the Arabian sea through a leading channel

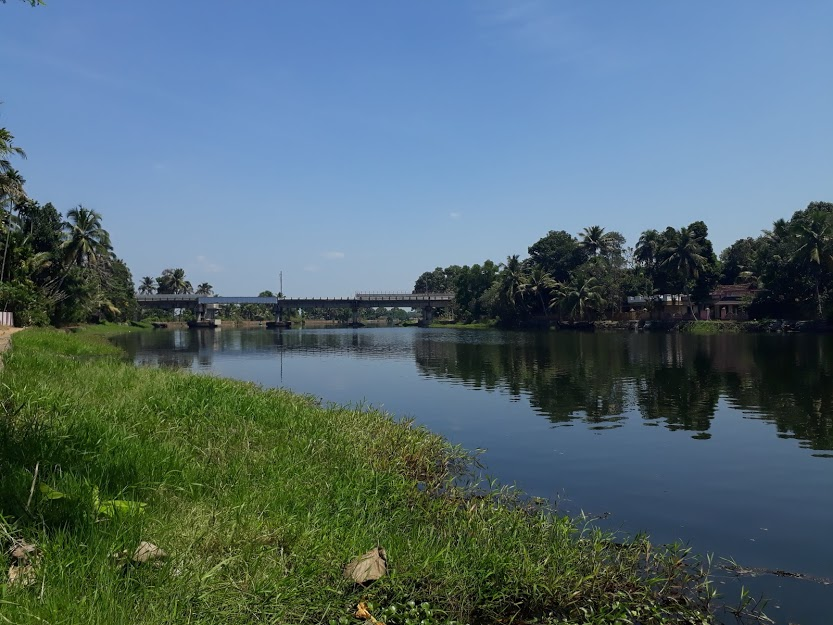
leading channel

. The famous Thotappally spillway is built on this merging point. Pallana Kumaran Asan Smarakam is also near Karuvatta. Mannarashala Nagaraja temple is around 4 kilometers away. Haripad is the nearest town to Karuvatta. Karuvatta is also famous for the Karuvatta Leading Channel Boat Race, an annual snake boat race or Vallamkali, which is held during the Onam harvest festival. The village of Karuvatta is well known for its communal harmony and its many temples, churches and mosques. The three major temples are Thiruvilanjal Durga Devi Temple, Karuvattakulangara temple and Kaduvankulangara Devi temple. Karuvatta is famous for the legend of the saint Karuvatta Swamikal. An Asramam and a temple were built for Swamikal by his devotees. Sree Narayana Dharma Seva Sangham, Kannukalipalam is known as the second Shivagiri. There are three more 'Guru Mandiram' in Karuvatta. Golok Ashram is famous among spiritual-oriented people.

The major churches are Mar Yakob Burdana orthodox church, The India Pentecostal Church Of God (I P C) Karuvatta, The Salem Mar Thomas Church, Karuvatta Marthoma Church, St. Thomas' Syro Malankara Catholic Church, Sagara Matha Roman Catholic Church, St. George Orthodox Church Karuvatta North, and St.Joseph's Roman Catholic Church Karuvatta North..

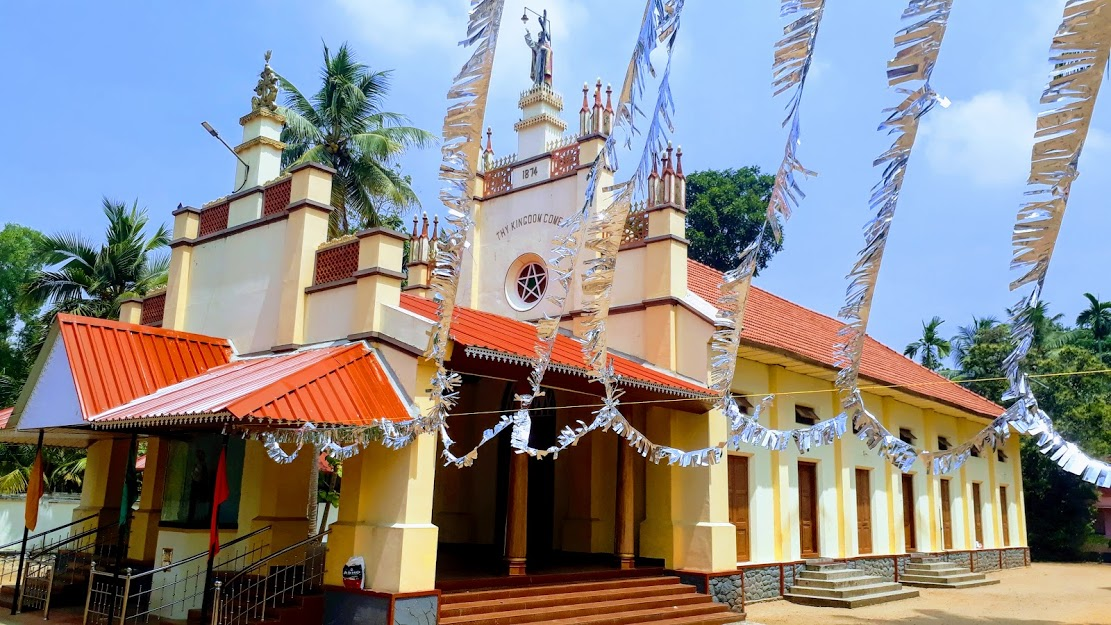
St. Joseph's Church Karuvatta North

The St. Joseph's church Karuvatta North was built in 1874 by the initiative of the Rev. Nelpurackal Manickakathanar. This church also has two smaller sister churches, one at Kumarapuram (Haripad) and the other near Kannukalipalam. The Holy Rasa (a religious procession), held at St. George Orthodox Church Karuvatta North is a major attraction. There is one mosque in Karuvatta, which is located at Vazhiyambalam.

Karamuttu is an island at the northern border of Karuvatta. The construction of a bridge is undergoing and about to finish in the coming years. It will be a greater relief to the people leaving in this area. There are more than 300 houses, Two Lower Primary Schools and Two Anganvadies in this area, and a branch of the Pamba River passes through. Late Karuvatta Chandran from Karamuttu was awarded the President's and State Government's awards for the best teacher. He was also a renowned playwright, comic writer, social worker and educationalist. The annual boat race held in Karuvatta is on the Pamba river. Thakazhi Sivasankara Pillai's House is approximately 6 km away from this place.

== Educational institutions ==
Karuvatta N.S.S Higher Secondary School was established (then, the NSS High School) before eighty-five years. It has from Fifth Standard (grade) to Plus Two course including an English Medium Batch. The school's land and the building were donated by Samudayathil Keshavakurup to Nair Service Society. Famous novelist Thakazhi Sivasankara Pillai was a former student. When the institution became a higher secondary school in 1997, Kattiyattu Sudhamony Kunjamma of the Samudayathil Family became the first principal.

There are five Upper Primary Schools teaching to the Kerala State-based SSLC syllabus: St.James U P School at Market Junction, S.K.V U P school at Vazhiyambalam Junction, S.N.D.P.U.P School Store Junction are amongst them. S.N.D.P.L.P School managed by the S.N.D.P Yogam Branch Number 291. Kumarapuram LPGS and LPBS are the very oldest schools, some of them 100 years or older. Kuzhikkad EALP school is also one of the very oldest schools in Karuvatta Village. There are many English medium schools teaching to the Central syllabus in addition to the above-mentioned Kerala State syllabus schools. Vidya Public School started in 1991, is one of these English medium schools teaching to the C.B.S.E syllabus.

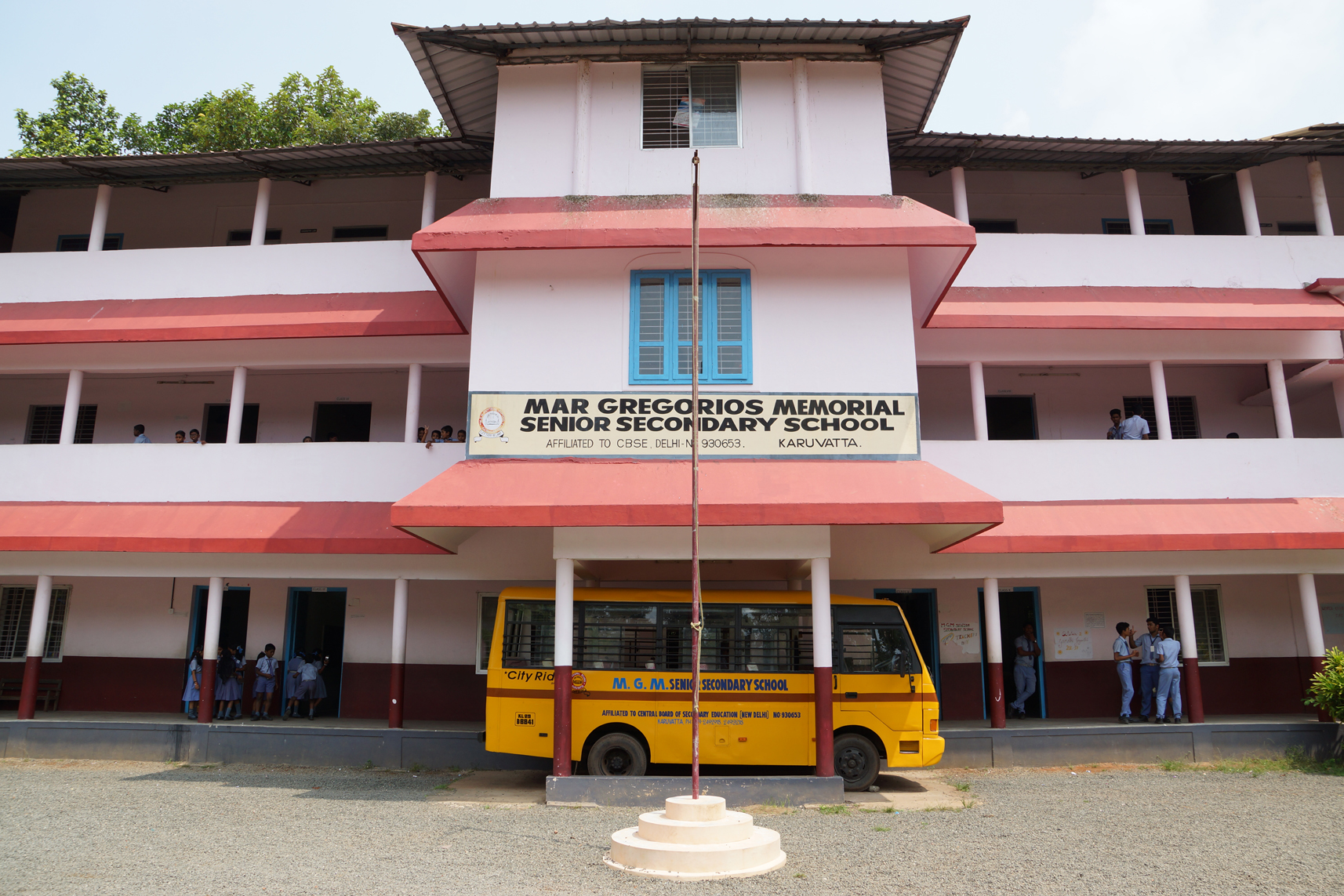
MGM Central School Karuvatta

M.G.M Central School Karuvatta established in the year 1983 is now providing education from kindergarten up to Higher seconder is situated in Karuvatta. The medium of instruction is English.

A.K.M.Trust school Karuvatta established in 1999 an accredited NIOS Managed By Ammalu Kunjamma Memorial Trust, Karuvatta. Now emerging as an educational institution providing education from kindergarten up to 7th STD. The medium of Instruction is English and syllabus is CBSE.

Tols School for Career Development (TSCAD) has established for career coaching using live e-learning platforms to coach aspirants of jobs abroad/Gulf Jobs and other competitive examinations and jobs in the private sector.

Several sports grounds, including one for football, help in the sport's development of the people in this area. The Young Strikers Football club and United Youngsters football club are the major Sports clubs in Karuvatta. Also, Janani cultural forum is a well-known arts club in the village.

== Karuvatta Vallamkali (Home Minister's Trophy) ==
It is one of the famous snake boat race event in alappuzha. There will be many snake boats which used to participate in the race every year. Karuvatta Puthen Chundan and Karuvatta Sree Vinayakan are the two snake boats belongs to karuvatta Village. The Vallamkali pavilion here is made by the fund of Honorable M P Shri. V M Sudheeran and the work is done by Contractor Shri P.M Jose, Punnoor Puthenparampil. It is also a venue for the Champions Boat League which takes place every year as the leading channel is a track where the boat race can be seen from starting to finishing.

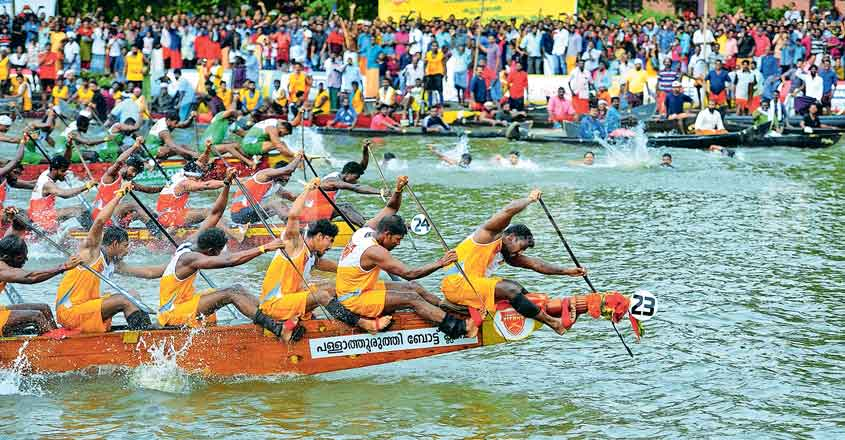

== Thiruvilanjal Devi Temple ==
It is the very famous Devi Temple, located at Thamallackal in Karthikappally Taluk, Alappuzha district. The main worship is for the Goddess Durga as Vana Durga and an idol situated in water as Jala Durga.

== Notable people ==
- Sreelatha Namboothiri, actress and playback singer
