= Ramesh Chennithala =

Indian politician (born 1956)

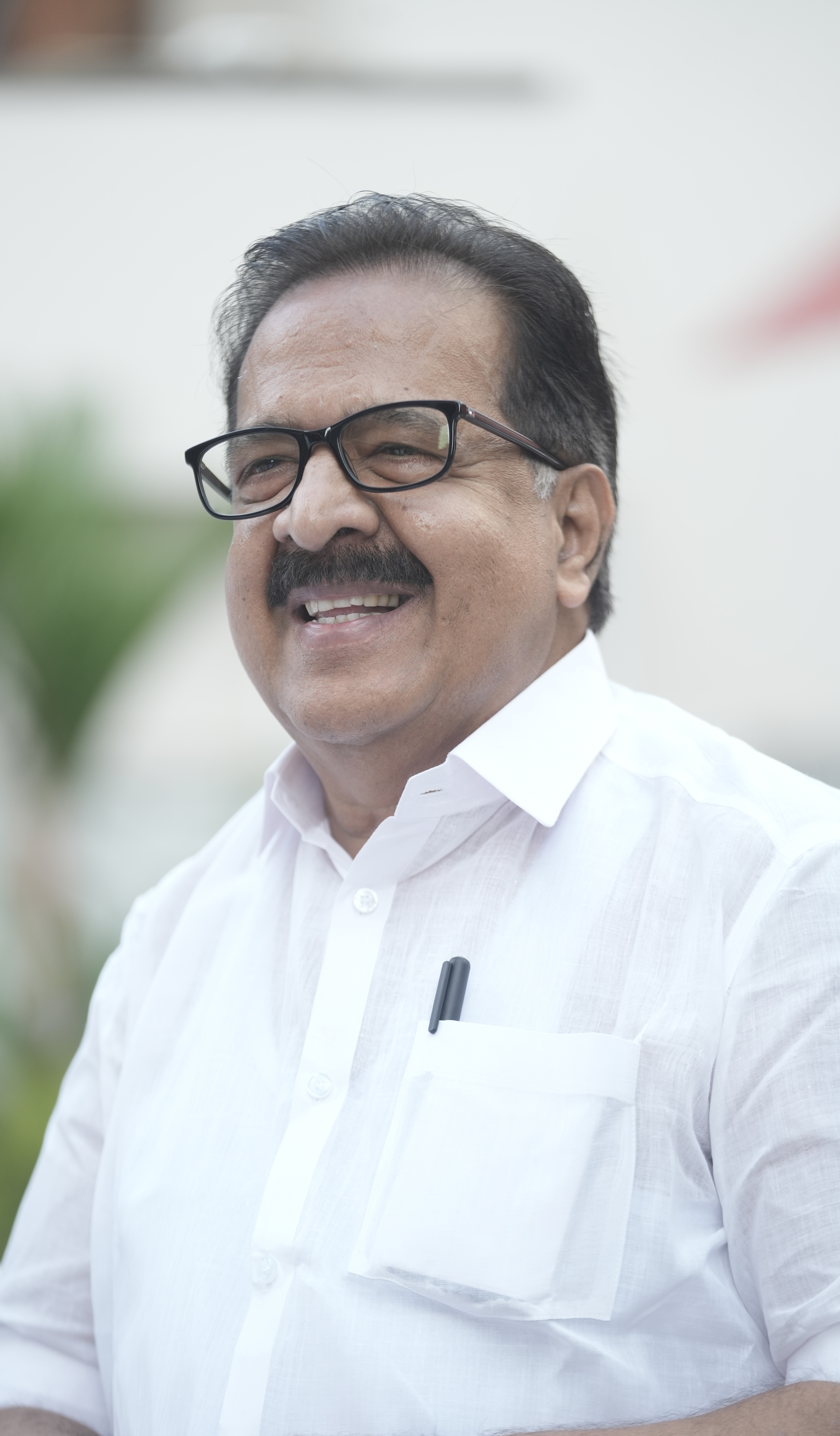
- Ramesh in 2021

Minister for Home, Vigilance, and Coir, Government of Kerala
- Incumbent
- Assumed office 18 May 2026
- Governor: Om Prakash Mathur
- Chief Minister: V.D. Satheesan
- Portfolio(s): See list: Home; Vigilance; Prisons; Fire and Rescue Services; Coir industry
- Preceded by: Pinarayi Vijayan (Home & Vigilance); P. Rajeeve (Coir)
- In office January 2014 – May 2016
- Chief Minister: Oommen Chandy
- Preceded by: Thiruvanchoor Radhakrishnan
- Succeeded by: Pinarayi Vijayan

10th Leader of the Opposition in the Kerala Legislative Assembly
- In office 29 May 2016 – 20 May 2021
- Governor: P. Sathasivam; Arif Mohammad Khan
- Preceded by: V. S. Achuthanandan
- Succeeded by: V. D. Satheesan

Minister for Rural Development, Government of Kerala
- In office 5 June 1986 – 25 March 1987
- Chief Minister: K. Karunakaran
- Preceded by: N/A
- Succeeded by: T. Sivadasa Menon

President of Kerala Pradesh Congress Committee
- In office 2005–2014
- Preceded by: K. Muraleedharan
- Succeeded by: V. M. Sudheeran

AICC incharge for Maharashtra Pradesh Congress Committee
- Incumbent
- Assumed office 24 December 2023
- Preceded by: H. K. Patil

Member of Parliament of Lok Sabha
- In office 13 October 1999 – 22 May 2004
- Preceded by: P. J. Kurien
- Succeeded by: C. S. Sujatha
- Constituency: Mavelikara
- In office 2 December 1989 – 19 March 1998
- Preceded by: K. Suresh Kurup
- Succeeded by: K. Suresh Kurup
- Constituency: Kottayam

Member of Kerala Legislative Assembly
- Incumbent
- Assumed office 1 June 2011
- Preceded by: Adv.B. Babuprasad
- Constituency: Haripad
- In office 21 May 1982 – 1 December 1989
- Preceded by: C. B. C. Warrier
- Succeeded by: K. K. Sreenivasan
- Constituency: Haripad

Personal details
- Born: 25 May 1956 (age 70) Chennithala, Travancore–Cochin (present day Keralam), India
- Party: Indian National Congress
- Spouse: Anitha Ramesh (m. 1986)
- Website: rameshchennithala.com

Ramesh Chennithala [ɾɐmeːʃ t͡ʃenːit̪ːɐlɐ] (born 25 May 1956) is an Indian politician in the state of Kerala who is currently serving as the Minister for Home Affairs, Vigilance, and Coir industry. He is a permanent invitee to the Working Committee of the Indian National Congress. He was previously the Cabinet minister for Home and Vigilance in the second Oommen Chandy ministry 13th Kerala Legislative Assembly and Leader of the Opposition in the 14th Kerala Legislative Assembly. He was also the President of Kerala Pradesh Congress Committee from 2005-2014 and holds the record for being in that position for the longest consecutive term.

== Early life ==
Ramesh Chennithala was born at Chennithala in the Alappuzha district of Kerala to V. Ramakrishnan Nair and Devakiamma. He studied at Mahatma High School in Chennithala. He then completed his B.A. degree in Economics from NSS Hindu College, Changanassery. Later, he did his LL.B. from the Government Law College, Thiruvananthapuram.

Ramesh is married to Anitha. The couple have two sons: Rohit Chennithala, who is a Physician, and Ramit Chennithala, who cleared Civil Services Examination with the 210th rank and serves in the Indian Revenue Service (IRS). Sreeja Bhasi and Junita John are his daughters-in-law.

== Political career ==
Ramesh started his political life during his early school days. In 1970, he became the Kerala Students Union (KSU) Chennithala HS Unit Secretary. He subsequently held a series of positions in KSU, namely Mavelikkara Taluk General Secretary in 1971, KSU Alappuzha District Treasurer in 1972, Alappuzha District Secretary in 1973, KSU State Executive Member in 1975, KSU State Vice President in 1978, and eventually becoming the KSU State President in 1980.

In 1982, he became All India President of the National Students Union of India and later in the same year was elected as MLA from Haripad Constituency. In 1985, he became the General Secretary of Indian Youth Congress and went on to become the youngest Minister (Rural Development) in the Ministry of K. Karunakaran in 1986 at the age of 28. In 1986, he became the President of Kerala Pradesh Youth Congress (I), Kerala and in 1987 he was re-elected as MLA from Haripad Constituency.

In 1989 he was elected as Member of Parliament from Kottayam Parliamentary Constituency and became National President, Indian Youth Congress in 1990. In 1999, he became Member of Parliament from Mavelikkara Parliamentary Constituency. In 2004 loksabha elections he was defeated by CPI(M) leader Adv. C.S. Sujatha.

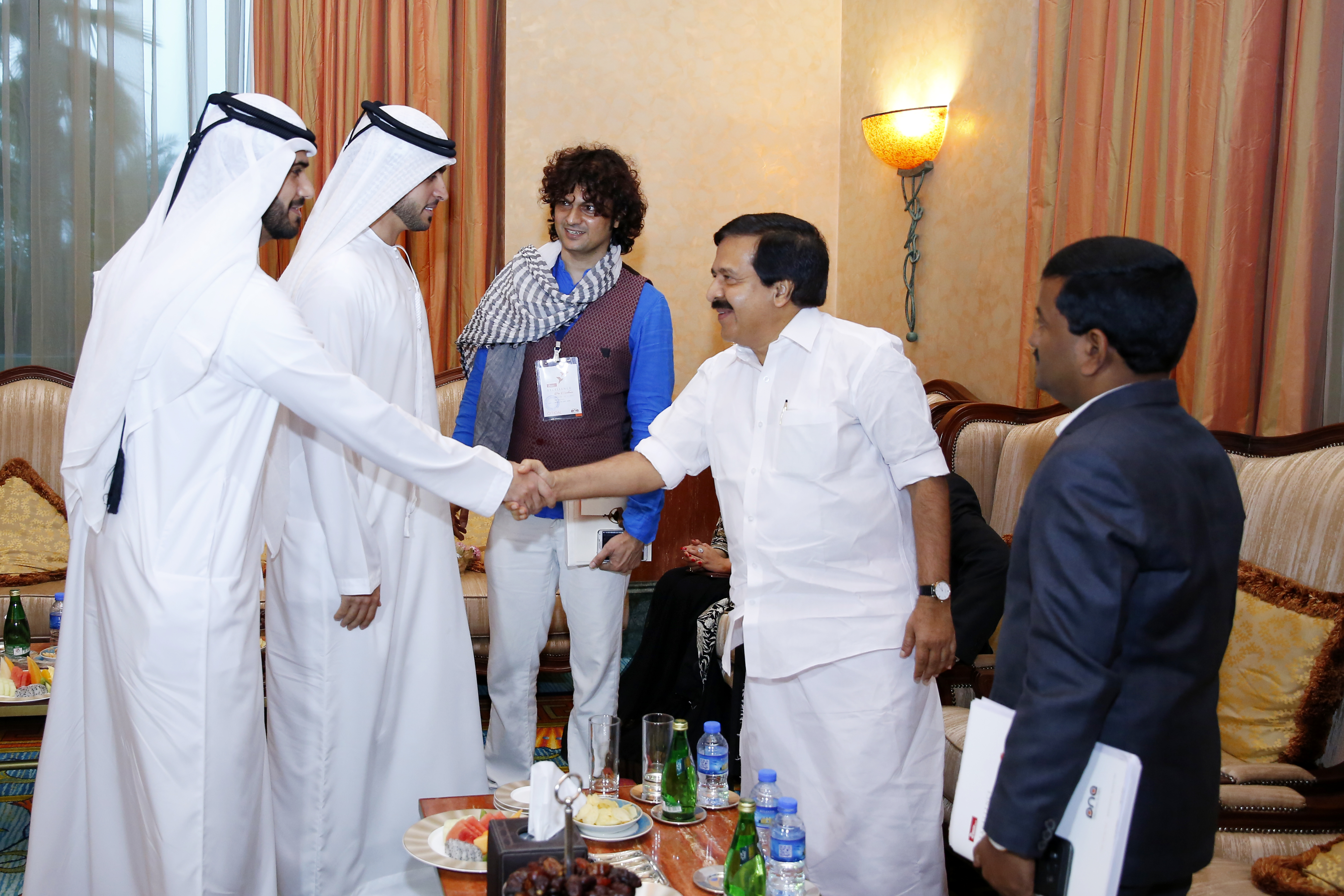
Ramesh Chennithala along with the delegates from UAE.

Later in 1991, 1996, and 1999 he was re-elected to Parliament. He received rich accolades for his fiery speeches in Hindi and English during his tenure. In 2001 he became the AICC Secretary with independent charge of seven states and in 2002 with independent charge of five states. In 2004, he was selected to the highest body of Indian National Congress, the Congress Working Committee (CWC).

He was also a member of various committees including Consultative Committee for Commerce; Labour and Welfare Committee; Central Committee for 125th Birth Anniversary of Mahatma Gandhi; Central Committee for Birth Centenary of Subhash Chandra Bose; Finance Committee – Lok Sabha; H.R.D. Standing Committee; Public Accounts Committee; Coir Board; Civil aviation Consultative Committee; and Joint Parliamentary Committee on Pesticides in Soft Drinks and Fruit Drinks. Other important positions held include KPCC President, AICC Secretary, Indian Youth Congress National President, President of Pradesh Youth Congress (I) Kerala.

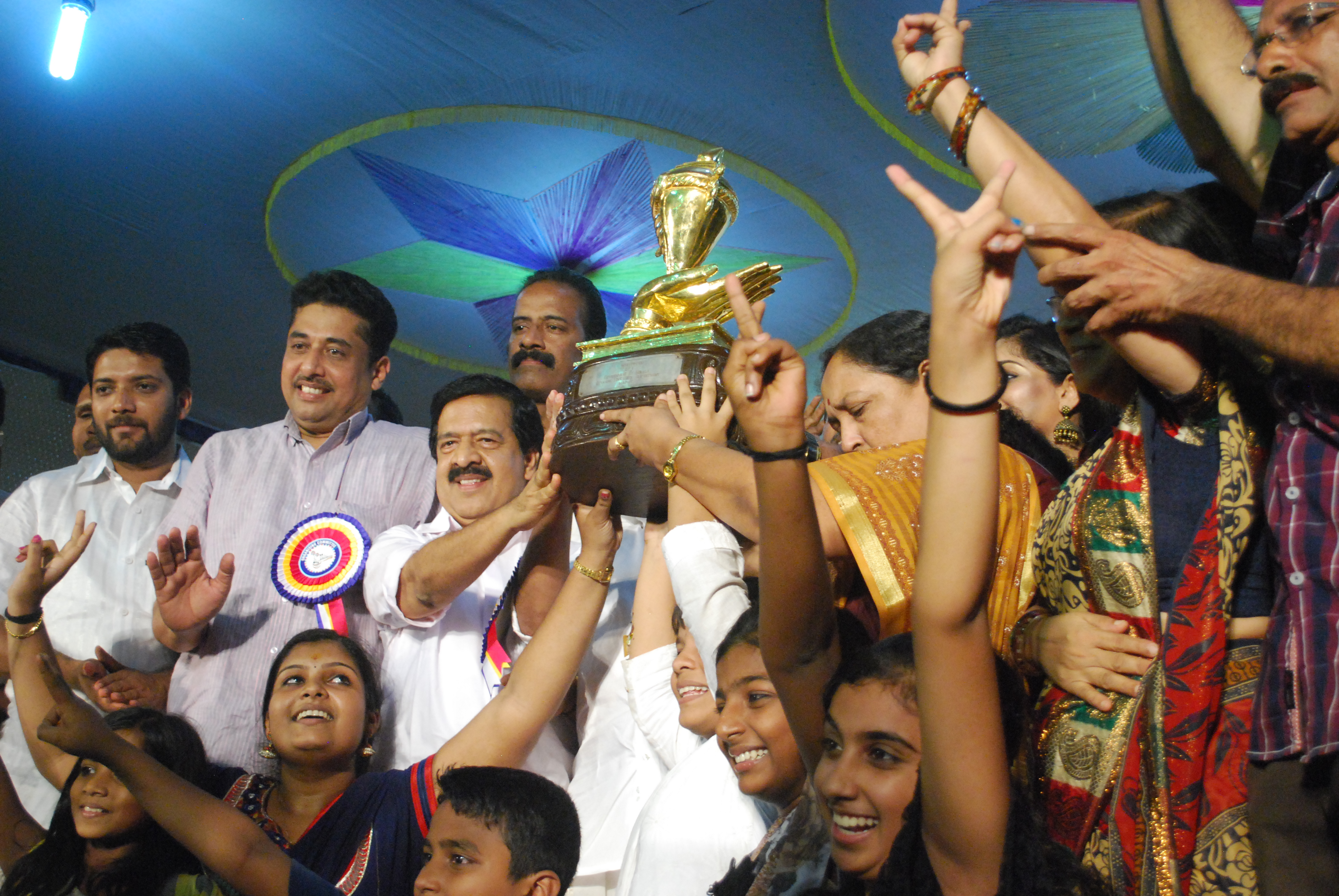
Ramesh Chennithala giving the Golden Trophy to the winners of Kerala School Kalolsavam, Asia's biggest cultural event.

In 2005, he returned to state politics to become president of Kerala Pradesh Congress Committee. In 2011, for the third time, he was re-elected as MLA from Haripad Constituency. In 2014, he was sworn in as the Home Minister of Kerala. His "Operation Kubera" project was intended to stop the reign of illegal money lenders in the state. The "Clean campus safe campus" project was to stop the usage of drugs in campus.

He shared the dais with Kerala chief minister Pinarayi Vijayan at a joint anti-CAA protest organised by the ruling CPM-led LDF to express his views on the CAA. Leader of the opposition Ramesh said he has moved a petition challenging the Act which drew criticism from the then-KPCC President Mullappally Ramachandran. However, KPCC vice-president V. D. Satheesan, stated that the protest against CAA and the proposed National Register of Citizens (NRC) was "a fight for a common cause".

In the 2026 Kerala Legislative Assembly election, the Indian National Congress led UDF alliance made a massive comeback with a thumping victory and he won his seat again. In the aftermath, he assumed office as the Minister of Home Affairs, Vigilance and Coir in the ministry headed by Chief Minister V D Satheesan. He launched the Operation Toofan aimed at having a massive complete crackdown against drug peddlers in the state and this move was greatly appreciated by the public. This operation is currently going on in full progress by the Kerala Police and with full cooperation and support from the general public. Also notably as the Home Minister, he launched the Project Zero along with the Kerala Vigilance and Anti Corruption Bureau to tackle and prevent corruption and also the Operation Grip along with the Kerala Police to tackle and prevent anti social activities and criminal activities in the state.

=== Electoral performance ===
Election	Year	Party	Constituency	Opponent		Result	Margin
Loksabha	1989	INC	Kottayam	CPI(M)	K. Suresh Kurup	Won	53,533
Loksabha	1991	INC	Kottayam	JD	Thampan Thomas	Won	62,622
Loksabha	1996	INC	Kottayam	JD	Jayalakshmi	Won	67,048
Loksabha	1998	INC	Kottayam	CPI(M)	K. Suresh Kurup	Lost	5,446
Loksabha	1999	INC	Mavelikara	CPI	Ninan Koshy	Won	33,443
Loksabha	2004	INC	Mavelikara	CPI(M)	C. S. Sujatha	Lost	7,414
Kerala Legislative Assembly	1982	INC	Haripad	CPI(M)	P. G. Thampi	Won	4,577
Kerala Legislative Assembly	1987	INC	Haripad	RSP	A. V. Thamarakshan	Won	3,817
Kerala Legislative Assembly	2011	INC	Haripad	CPI	G. Krishnaprasad	Won	3,145
Kerala Legislative Assembly	2016	INC	Haripad	CPI	P. Prasad	Won	18,621
Kerala Legislative Assembly	2021	INC	Haripad	CPI	R. Sajilal	Won	13,666
Kerala Legislative Assembly	2026	INC	Haripad	CPI	T.T. Jismon	Won	23,377

== Ministries ==
Ramesh Chennithala holds the record of being the youngest minister in the state at the age of 28.

- Minister of Rural Development in the Third K. Karunakaran ministry from 1986 to 1987.

He became a Member of Parliament for a long period, returned to state politics in 2005, and became the president of the state Congress Party.

- Minister for Home and Vigilance in the Second Oommen Chandy ministry from 2014 to 2016.

After the 2016 Kerala election, he became the Leader of the Opposition of the state.

- Minister for Home Affairs, Vigilance, and Coir in the Satheesan ministry from 2026.

== Leader of Opposition ==
A meeting held by the Congress leaders on 29 May 2016 chose Ramesh Chennithala as the Leader of Opposition of Kerala Niyamasabha. Under his leadership the UDF emerged victorious in 2019 Indian general election by winning 19 out of 20 seats in Kerala. This was their biggest victory in the elections after the 1977 election. It was under his leadership UDF faced such a defeat in 2021 Kerala Legislative Assembly election and LDF retained power by breaking the four-decade alternative rule trend between Left Democratic Front (Kerala) and United Democratic Front (Kerala).

=== Actions taken ===
- Ramesh Chennithala approached the Anti-Corruption Court against Chief Minister Pinarayi Vijayan and Excise Minister T. P. Ramakrishnan for revising the liquor policy in the state. However, the Supreme Court exempted gram panchayat areas having an urban nature from liquor prohibition, leading to the reopening of all shut outlets. Following this, Ramesh argued that the government was misinterpreting the SC verdict.

== Awards ==
- He received the P. V. Sankaranarayanan Memorial Award in 2014.
