= Keerikkad =

- Town
- Location in Kerala, India Keerikkad (India)
- Coordinates: 9°10′0″N 76°29′0″E
- Country: India
- State: Kerala
- District: Alappuzha

Government
  - Type: Panchayati raj (India)
  - Body: Gram panchayat

Population (2011)
  - Total: 10,465

Languages
  - Official: Malayalam, English
- Time zone: UTC+5:30 (IST)
- Postal code: 690508

Keerikkad (Town) is a suburban region in Alappuzha district in the Indian state of Kerala. There are two major attractions in Keerikkad. One is Evoor Sree Krishna Swamy temple and Ramapuram Bhagavathi Temple. Lord Krishna is the main deity of the former temple while Ma Kali is the main deity of the latter.

== Demographics ==
As of the 2011 India census, Keerikkad (Town) had a population of 10465 with 4819 males and 5646 females. The female sex-ratio of Keerikkad town is around 1172 compared to 1084 which is average of Kerala state. The literacy rate of Keerikkad city is 95.26% out of which 96.99% males are literate and 93.81% females are literate. There are 9.21% Scheduled Caste (SC) and 0.68% Scheduled Tribe (ST) of total population in Keerikkad town.
