= Thottappally =

Coastal town

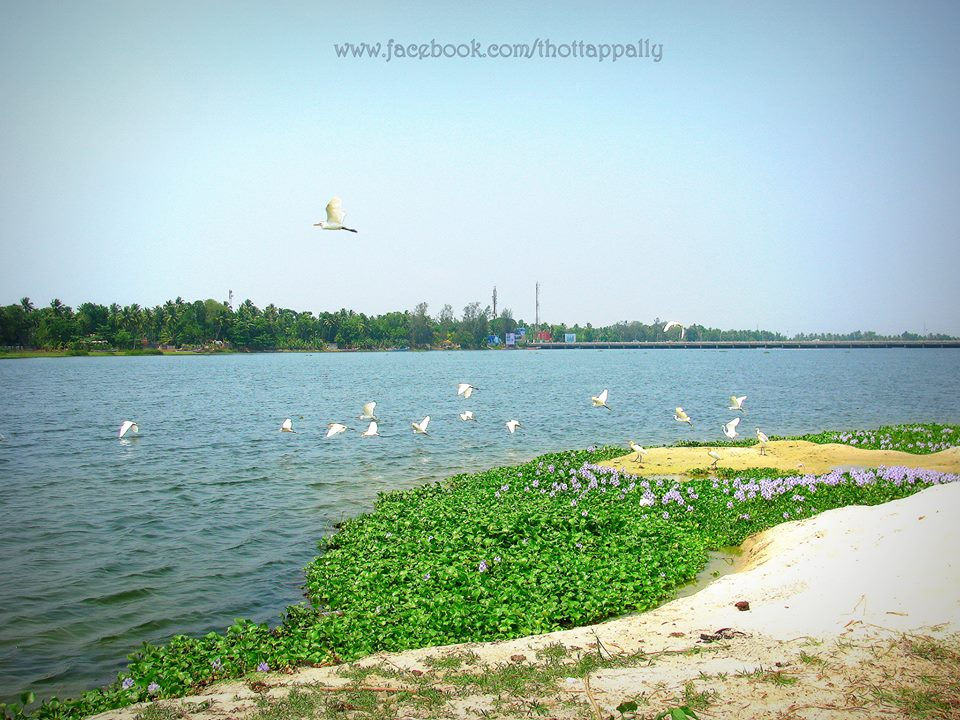
Thottappalli

Thottappally is a coastal village in Alappuzha district in the state of Kerala, India. Thottappally is especially notable for Thottappally Spillway, a spillway cum bridge on the National Highway 66 between Alappuzha and Kollam. The spillway is one of the two regulators used to regulate the water level in the paddy fields of Kuttanad, the other being at Thanneermukkom. Thottappally is Kuttanad's drain-way-out to the Arabian Sea. The Thottappally Spillway splits the Thottappally lake with the fresh water part to the east and saline Thottappally rivermouth to the west merging with the Arabian Sea. The beach and fishing harbour of Purakkad, which got into fame through the celebrated film and novel Chemmeen, is adjacent to Thottappally.

Thottappally, is known for its fishing harbour and its Coastal Police Station. The coast, with the help of the Kerala State Forest Department, has been improved through a planting drive to improve its vegetation.
