= Cheppad =

Cheppad Cheppaud
- Village
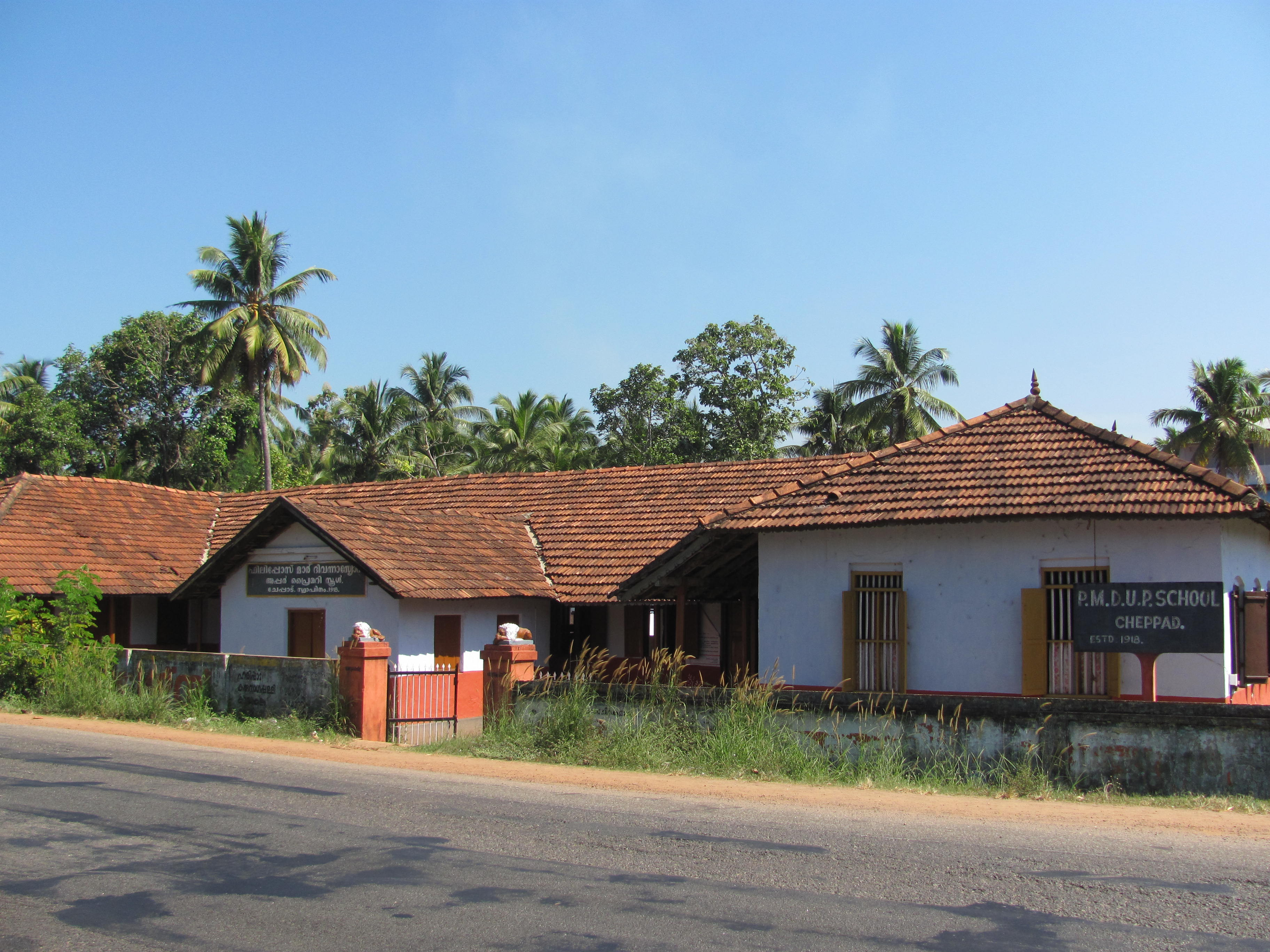
- P.M.D. Upper Primary School
- Interactive map of Cheppad
- Coordinates: 9.2522200°N 76.467210°E
- Country: India
- State: Kerala
- District: Alappuzha

Government
  - Body: Gram panchayat

Languages
  - Official: Malayalam, English
- Time zone: UTC+5:30 (IST)
- Vehicle registration: KL-04
- Lok Sabha constituency: Alappuzha
- Vidhan Sabha constituency: Haripad

Cheppad is a scenic village near Haripad in Alappuzha district in Kerala State, India. It is about halfway between Kochi and Thiruvananthapuram on the National Highway 47 (now NH 66).

== Etymology ==
Cheppad was known as "Cheppukadu" in ancient times; "cheppu" indicates a small container and "kadu" indicates a small forest.

== Economy ==
Cheppad town has a national thermal power station and 5-star hotels. The National Highway 66 development gives Cheppad access to all major cities. Cheppad has a modernized railway station. The town has a Government Ayurveda Hospital with doctors 24 hours a day.

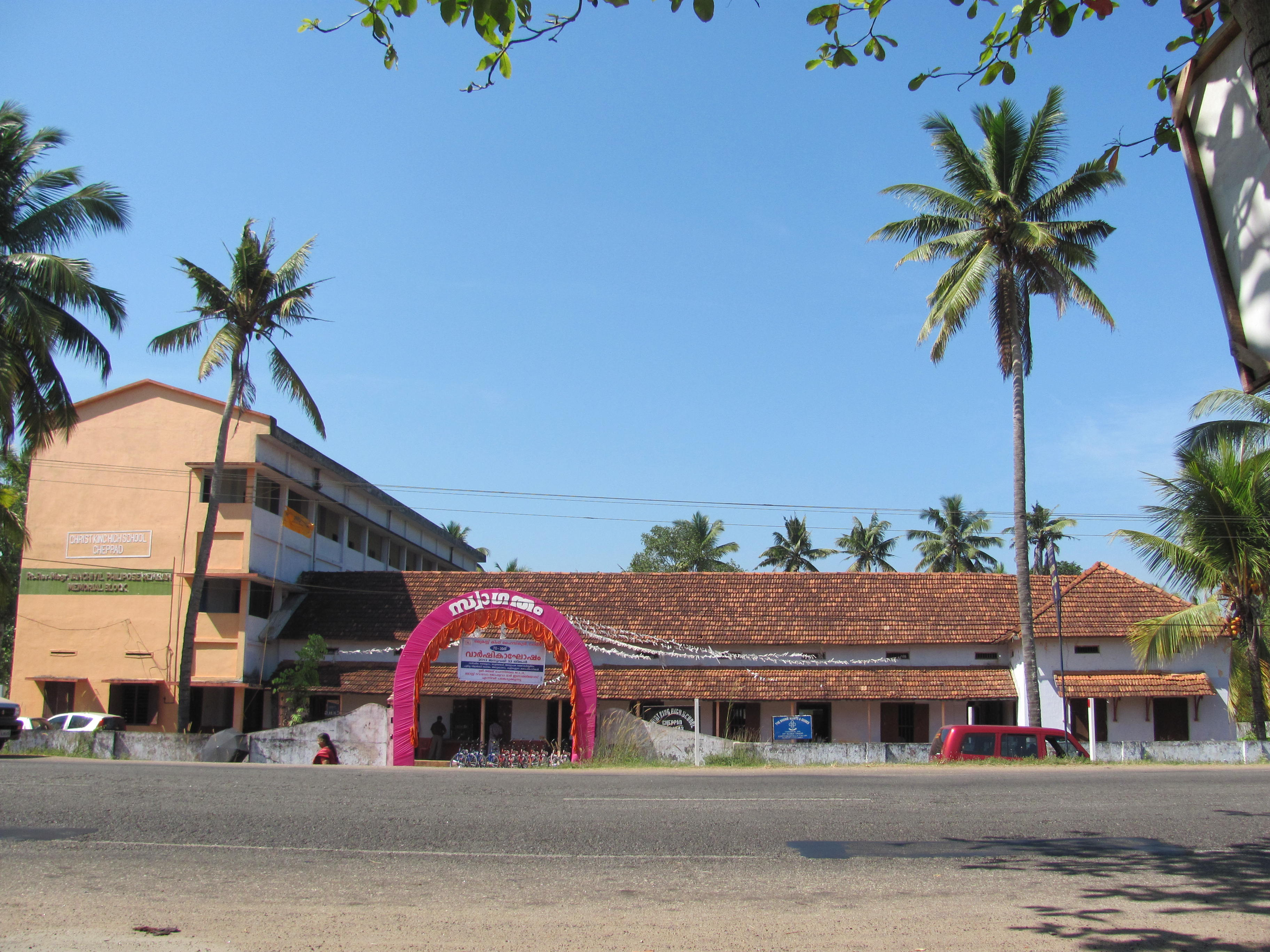
Christ King High School

== Demography ==
Cheppad is inhabited by a predominantly Hindu community. The Christian community is the second largest religious community and many denominations of Christian faith can be found here. There is no documentary evidence to establish the arrival of Christian community to this place. St. George Orthodox Church, Cheppad under the Malankara Orthodox Syrian Church is a major attraction of Cheppad.

== St. George Orthodox Church ==
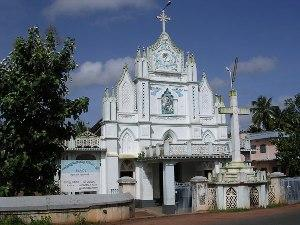
St. George Orthodox Church, Cheppad

St. George Orthodox Church in Cheppad is popularly known as Cheppad Valiya Pally, and is a pilgrim center of the Malankara Orthodox Church. The church may date from 1175. St. George Orthodox Church is the resting place of Cheppad Philipose Mar Dionysius, Malankara Metropolitan of the Malankara Orthodox Syrian Church from 1825 to 1855. The 900-year-old mural paintings in Cheppad St. George Orthodox Church exhibits the Christian traditional paintings. The paintings are on the walls of the Madbaha (altar) of the Church and show events from the life of Jesus Christ from birth to ascension and few events from the old testament.

== See also ==
- Dionysius IV of Cheppad
