= Cheruthana =

- village
- Location in Kerala, India Cheruthana (India)
- Coordinates: 9.3230400°N 76.4382100°E
- Country: India
- State: Kerala
- District: Alappuzha

Population (2011)
  - Total: 12,882

Languages
  - Official: Malayalam, English
- Time zone: UTC+5:30 (IST)

Cheruthana is a village in Alappuzha district in the Indian state of Kerala.

== Demographics ==
As of 2011 India census, Cheruthana had a population of 12882 with 6017 males and 6865 females.
