= Haripad Sree Subrahmanya Swamy Temple =

Hindu temple in Kerala, India

Haripad Sree Subrahmanya Swamy temple
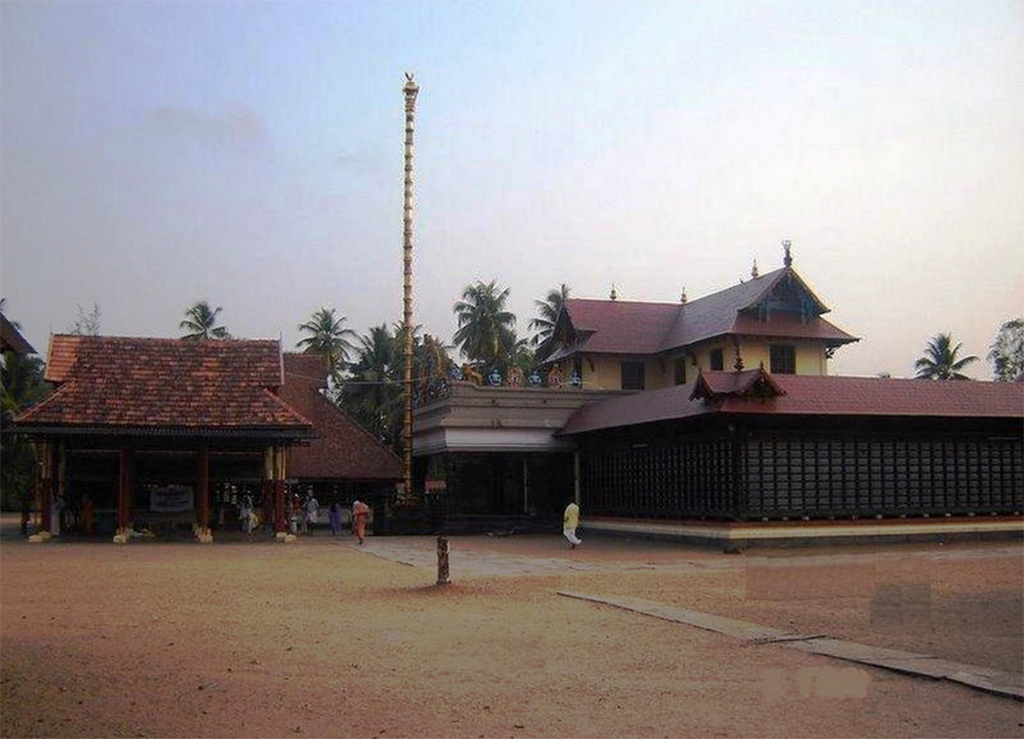

- Location in Kerala

Religion
- Affiliation: Hinduism
- District: Alappuzha
- Deity: Karthikeya (Harigeethapureshan) (lit."God of Haripad")
- Festivals: Chitira Ulsavam; Markazhi Ulsavam; Aavani Ulsavam; Thaipooyam
- Governing body: Travancore Devaswom Board

Location
- Location: Haripad
- State: Kerala
- Country: India
- Coordinates: 9°17′5″N 76°30′5″E

Architecture
- Type: Traditional Kerala style
- Established: Before the advent of Kali Yuga
- Completed: 20th century

Website
- haripadsubrahmanyaswamytemple

The Sree Subrahmanya Swamy Temple (Perumthrikkovil), also known as Kerala Palani or Dakshina Palani (lit. 'Southern Palani'), in Haripad, Kerala, is one of the oldest and largest temples in the region. According to belief, the temple predates the beginning of the Kali Yuga. This temple holds the distinction of being the largest Subrahmanya Swami Temple in Kerala, and features the longest golden flagpost, known as the dhwajastambha (kodimaram in Malayalam). The temple's main deity is believed to embody not only Subrahmanya Swamy but also Shiva and Vishnu, making it a highly revered and powerful place of worship.

== Early history ==
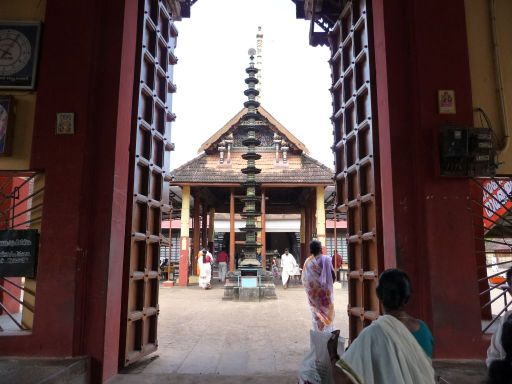
Main entrance to the temple

According to legend, the idol was temporarily placed for public viewing for half an hour under a banyan tree belonging to a Christian family, Tharakanmar. There is a small temple at that location known as "Ara Nazhika Ambalam".

In the Malayalam year 1096, the temple suffered a fire, but the golden flag mast and the Koothambalam were fortunately saved. During the reign of King Sree Chithira Thirunal Rama Varma, the temple was rebuilt, and the golden flag mast was reinstalled.

== Primary deity ==
The presiding deity of the temple is Karthikeya in his four-armed form. The idol holds the divine spear Vel in one hand and a Vajrayudha (thunderbolt) in another, with one hand bestowing blessings and the other touching its thighs. According to belief, the idol embodies the presence of Vishnu, Shiva, and Brahma. The idol stands at approximately six feet in height and in installed facing towards the east.

== Other deities ==
Beside the main deity, there are many other deities, which include Dakshinamurthy, Ganesh, Thiruvambadi Kannan, Nāga, Shasta, and Keezhthrikkovil Subrahmanyan.

== Temple description ==
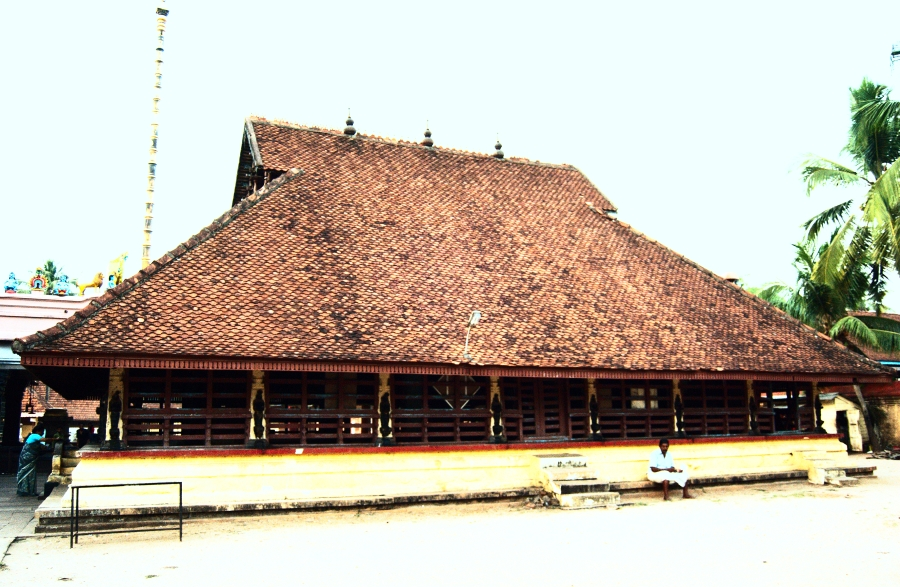
Koothambalam in Haripad Sree Subrahmanya Swamy Temple

The temple features four gopurams (ornate entrance towers). A dhwajastambha (golden flag mast) adorns the eastern side of the temple. The sanctum sanctorum is round in shape. Additionally, the temple compound houses a Koothambalam, which is the third largest of its kind among Kerala temples. The temple premises serve as a sanctuary for peacocks, the vahana (animal mount) of Murugan.

== Festivals ==
Apart from the Utsava Trayam, the temple also observes other important festivals, such as Thrikkarthika in Vrischikam, Prathishta day in Idavam, Skanda Ashthami in Thulam, Navarathri in Kanni, and Thaipooyam in Makaram.

== See also ==
- Temples of Kerala
- Temple festivals of Kerala
