= Mannarasala Temple =

- Mannarasala Sree Nagaraja Temple
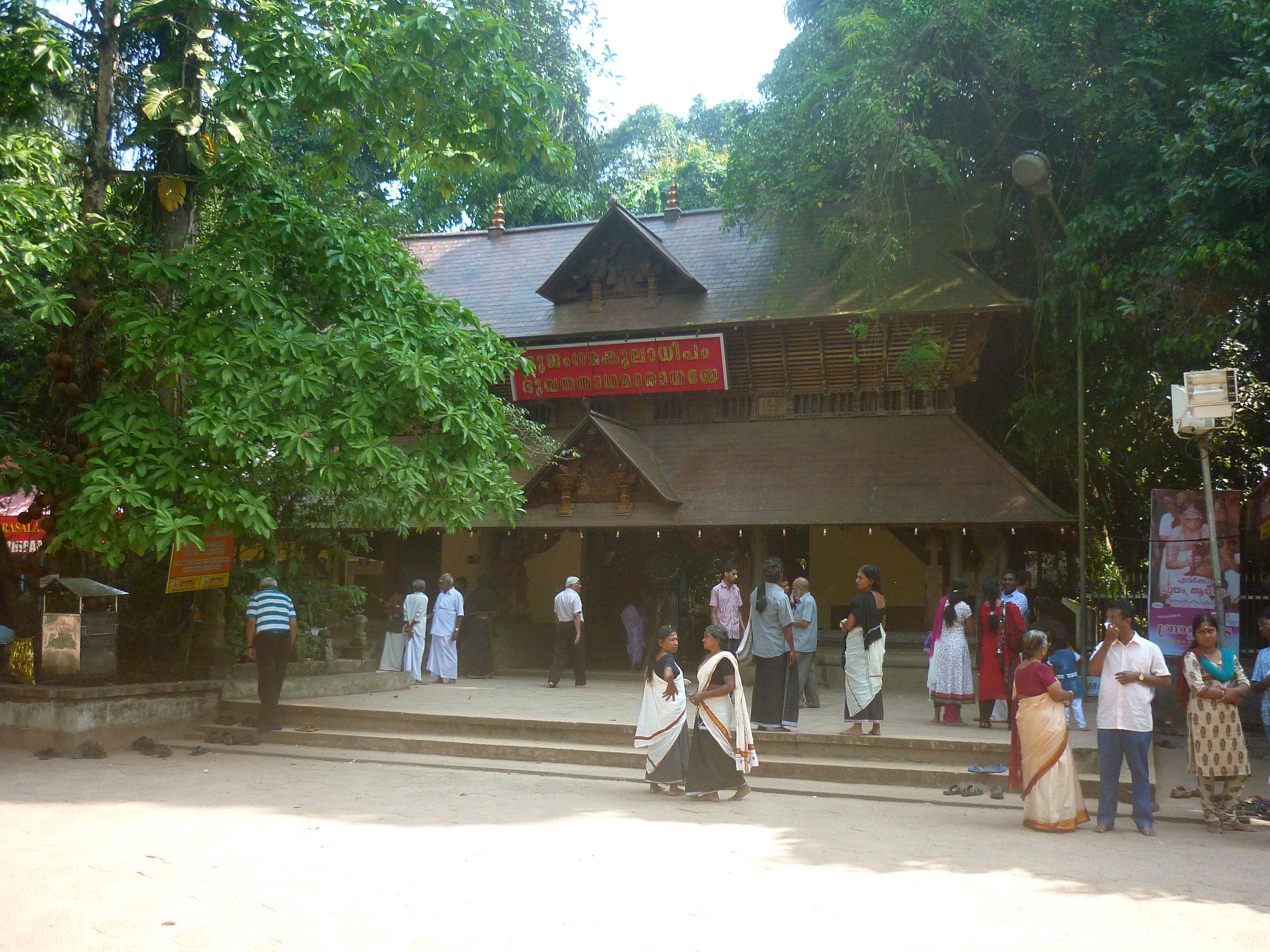

- Mannarasala Nagaraja Temple, Haripad, Alappuzha, Kerala

Religion
- Affiliation: Hinduism
- District: Alappuzha
- Deity: Nagaraja
- Festivals: Mannarasala Aayilyam, Maha Shivaratri

Location
- Location: Haripad
- State: Kerala
- Country: India
- Coordinates: 9°17′23.1″N 76°26′44.4″E

Architecture
- Type: Architecture of Kerala

Specifications
- Temple: One
- Elevation: 34.44 m (113 ft)

Website
- www.mannarasala.org

Mannarasala Sree Nagaraja Temple (Malayalam: മണ്ണാറശാല ശ്രീ നാഗരാജാക്ഷേത്രം) is a Hindu temple in Kerala, India, dedicated to the worship of serpent gods.

== Description ==
The temple is located in the municipality of Haripad, in Alappuzha district of Kerala. It is surrounded by forest. The main deity of the temple is Nagaraja.

The Mannarasala Temple has over 100,000 images of snakes along the paths and among the trees, and is the largest such temple in Kerala, India. Couples seeking fertility come to worship at the temple, and upon the birth of their child, return to the temple to hold thanksgiving ceremonies, often bringing new snake images as offerings. The temple has a special turmeric paste which is reputed to have curative powers.

== History ==
The temple was visited by a Christian missionary named Samuel Mateer in 1880.

The temple was described in the official report on the 1891 Travancore census, and also in The Travancore State Manual in 1906.

Though the legends related to the origin of a place cannot be deemed as its history, the story on the evolution of Mannarasala as one of the foremost places of worship of the Serpent Gods is associated with Lord Parashurama who is widely believed to be the creator of Kerala. This history of Mannarasala has been mentioned in the 'Mandara Salodyam', a Sanskrit poem written by Mannarasala M.G. Narayanan Namboothiri of the sacred family based on the accounts and legends handed down and old scriptures and books available with the temple.

=== According to legend ===
The story begins with the creation of Kerala.

Parashurama, an axe-wielding warrior sage, was the sixth avatar (incarnation) of Vishnu. When Parashurama threw his battle-axe into the ocean, it caused the area of land that would become Kerala to rise from the sea. But the soil was so salty that crops refused to grow, making the land uninhabitable. Parashurama was told by Shiva that the nāgas were the only ones that had the ability to fix the soil. Parashurama prayed to Nagaraja, who granted his request, making the soil fertile and the land habitable. Parashurama then asked Nagaraja to stay and protect the land forever. Nagaraja was willing, and became the deity of Mannarasala Temple.

After giving important instructions to be followed to preserve the sanctity of the place, Parashurama proceeded to the Mahendra Mountains to continue his austerities.

=== Vasudeva and Sreedevi ===
Many generations passed by. The family fell into the grief of childlessness. Vasudeva and Sreedevi were the sad couple who had to bear that heavy load of sorrow, who resolutely worshiped Nagaraja to allay their grief. It was about this time that unexpectedly fire broke out in the jungle around the dwelling place of Nagaraja and burnt down the jungle. The serpents were tortured by the flames, forcing them to hide in their pits with great difficulty. Vasudeva and Sreedevi looked after the serpents, who had their hoods charred, bodies half-burnt, and fainting from time to time, falling down and crawling along. They gently fanned them with fans made of sweet-scented grass and poured ghee mixed with honey and oil on the wounds; cooled their melted bodies with sandalwood ointment; and comforted them. They put them at the foot of banyan trees. They performed purification ceremonies and consecrated the pits; and were put up in special places under the shade of deodar trees and in Chitrakudas.

The couple performed abhisheka with theertha like Panchagavya (a holy mixture of five items from the cow's milk, curd, butter, urine and dung); observed elaborate poojas according to rules with areca nut flower bunches, fragrant flowers and water, incense etc., Nivedyam with melted butter (ghee), milk, payasam with molasses, rice powder, turmeric powder, coconut juice, Kadali fruit, cow's milk, all mixed together in the proper form as Nurum Palum, equivalent to the elixir of life. They offered serpent deities with great devotion, appam, aval (beaten rice or rice wafers), tender coconut etc. They chanted vedic mantras, performed homams and all kinds of poojas to restore those crowds of serpents to full health.

The omnipresent and omnipotent Nagaraja was greatly pleased with their continuous penance and the love shown to his associates; Nagaraja made himself visible to the couple and blessed them that he would incarnate on the earth as their beloved son. He said " I shall assume the form of a serpent and stay here (in Mannarasala) permanently, as long as the sun and the moon are there, showering prosperity on your family and granting protection to all the devotees who come here …". Thus Mandarasala, the place filled with Mandara trees, the holy spot where the serpents got shelter, where the earth was fully cooled, became Mandarasala. The boon came true. The Brahmin lady became pregnant and gave birth to five-hooded serpent-child as well as a human child. The two brothers grew up together. Initiation ceremonies and Vedic education were carried out at the proper time in the traditional style. Nagaraja instructed the younger brother to enter into matrimony for the perpetual reservation of the holy family and he obeyed it. When the five-hooded Nagaraja realized that the objectives of his incarnation were realized, he informed the Holy Mother that henceforth he would live at this Illam by entering into Samadhi to bless the devotees. Then he suggested certain inviolable rituals and rules for offering worship and then went into the immaculate cellar and vanished. (It is believed that even today that five-hooded Nagaraja stays in the cellar doing Tapas for the abound prosperity of his dependents. The members of the household always refer to him with great respect and devotion as "Muthassan" and "Appoppan" (Grand father). The jungle close by is the exclusive preserve for his unobstructed peregrinations (Appoppan Kavu - Grandfathers' Grove).

== Mannarasala Ayilyam ==
Mannarasala Ayilyam is the main Temple festival. On the day of Ayilyam asterism in the months of Kanni and Thulam (September and October), all the serpentine idols in the grove and the temple are taken in procession to the Brahmin illom, where the offerings of Nurum Palum (rice flour and milk), Kuruthi (a red liquid made of turmeric and lime) and cooked rice are made. The matriarch of Mannarasala Illom carries the idol of the Nagaraja.

== See also ==
- Temples of Kerala
- Temple festivals of Kerala
