= Thrikkunnapuzha =

- village
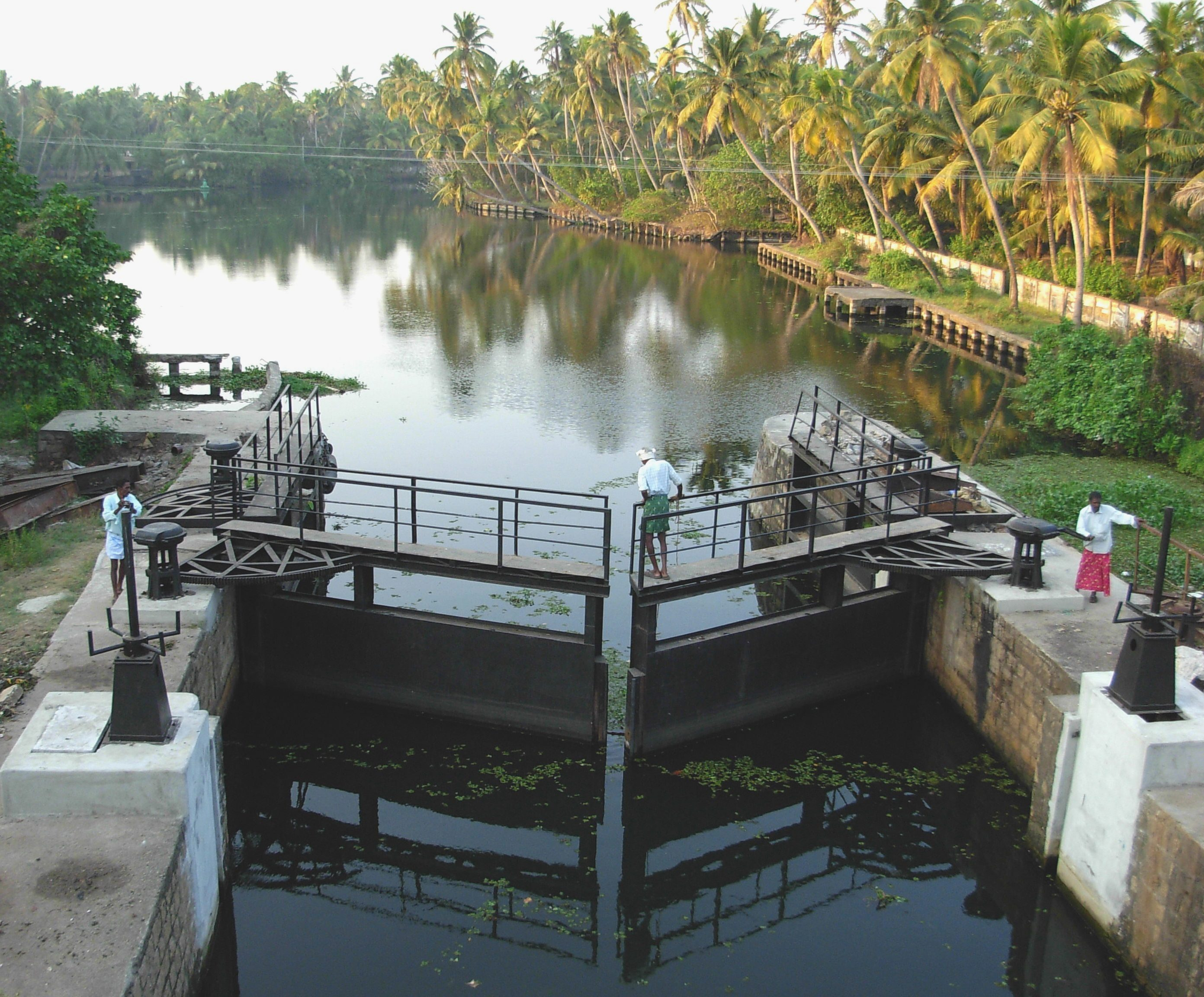
- Water Way
- Interactive map of Thrikkunnapuzha
- Coordinates: 9°17′17.146″N 76°23′50.562″E
- Country: India
- State: Kerala
- District: Alappuzha

Population (2011)
  - Total: 26,679

Languages
  - Official: Malayalam, English
- Time zone: UTC+5:30 (IST)
- PIN: 690515

Thrikkunnapuzha is a village near Harippad in Alappuzha district in the Indian state of Kerala.

Thrikkunnapuzha is the south-west part of Alappuzha district, Kerala, India. Thrikkunnapuzha is one of the gateway to the inland water ways of Alappey. This place, where narrow canals, rivers, lakes lagoons and land meet are aptly called "backwaters". It is the land of fishermen. National Waterway 3 passes through the place.

Thrikkunnapuzha beach is known for Karkidaka vavu or "Karkidaka Vavu Bali". The beach of Thrikkunnapuzha is rich in mineral sand called black sand.

Thrikkunnapuzha is known for its Ayyappa Swami Temple - “Thrkkunnappuzha Sri DharmaSastha Temple” is one of the famous temples in Alappuzha District.

The only Pentecostal Church is belongs Assemblies of God Malayalam District Council. Assembly of God Revival Centre also situated here. Rev Royson Johni from Kulathupuzha built the Church here.

Kumaran Asan, the Malayalam poet, died in a boat accident at Pallanayar in Kumarakodi of Thrikkunnappuzha.

== Attraction ==
- Karrkidaka Vaavu Bali (Keralite tribute ceremony for ancestors)
- Thrikkunnapuzha Sree Dharmasastha Temple
- Pathiyankara Juma Masjid
- Muhiyudheen Juma MAsjid
- Coir Village Lake Resort
- Mahakavi Kumaranasan's tomb, Kumarakodi
- Boat Races
- Backwater cruise
- Thrikkunnapuzha Beach
- Toddy Shops
- Devas Chudan Vallam
- TKP Allu Arjun Fans
