= Muthukulam =

- Village
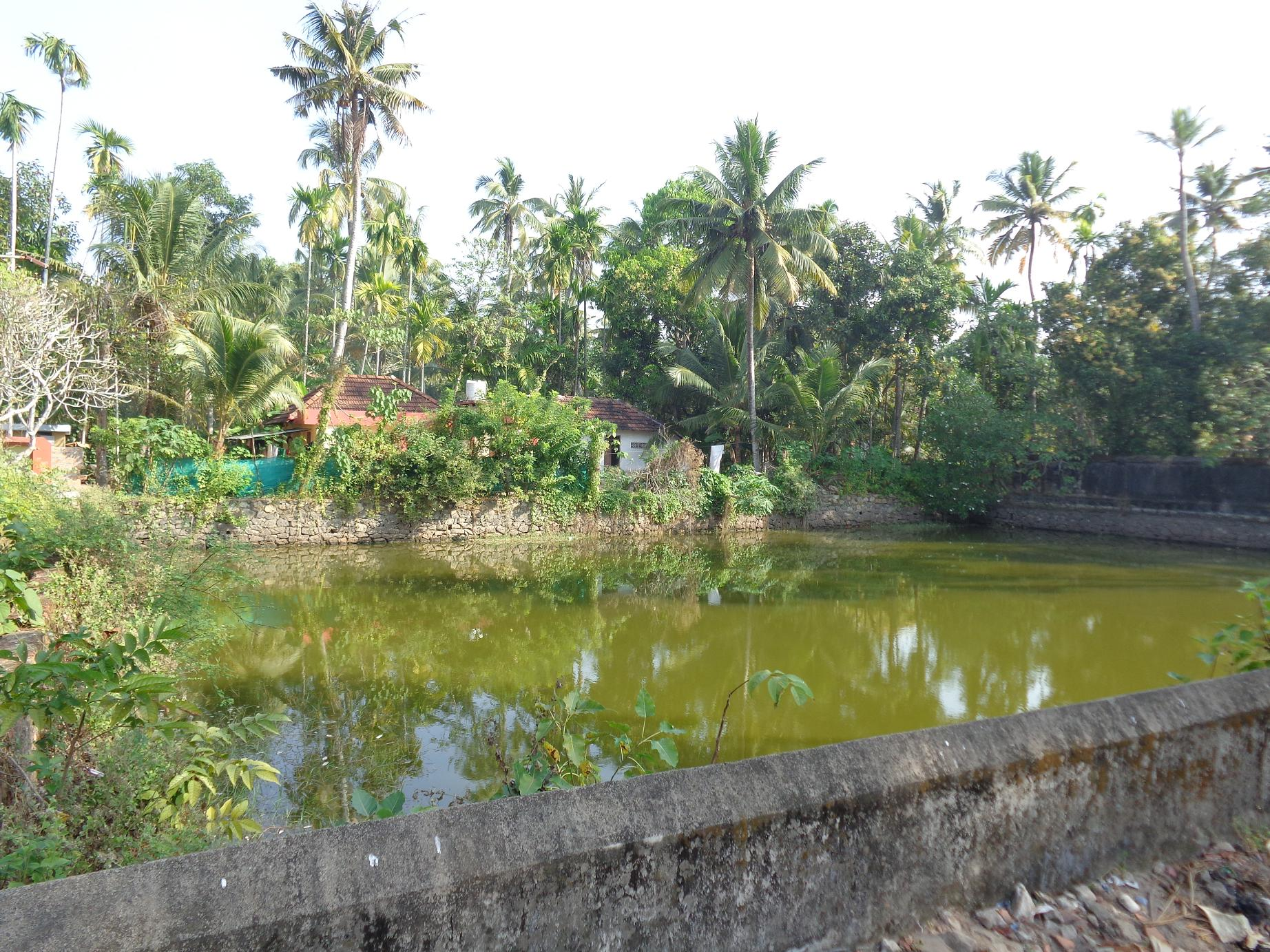
- Pandavarkavu Devi Temple pond
- Interactive map of Muthukulam
- Coordinates: 9°13′0″N 76°27′30″E
- Country: India
- State: Kerala
- District: Alappuzha

Government
  - Type: Grama Panchayat

Area
  - Total: 10.75 km^{2} (4.15 sq mi)
- Elevation: +1 m (3.3 ft)

Population (2011)
  - Total: 20,740
  - Density: 1,929/km^{2} (4,997/sq mi)

Languages
  - Official: Malayalam, English
- Time zone: UTC+5:30 (IST)
- PIN: 690506
- Telephone code: 0479
- Vehicle registration: KL 29
- Nearest city: Alappuzha
- Lok Sabha constituency: Alappuzha
- Vidhan Sabha constituency: Haripad

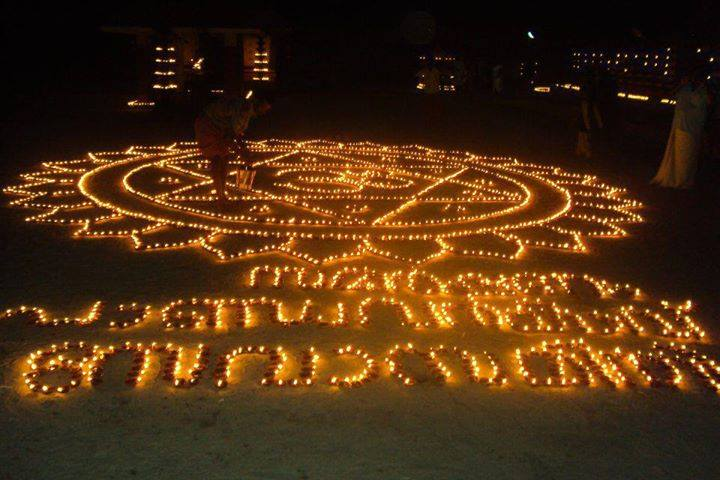
Pandavarkavu temple

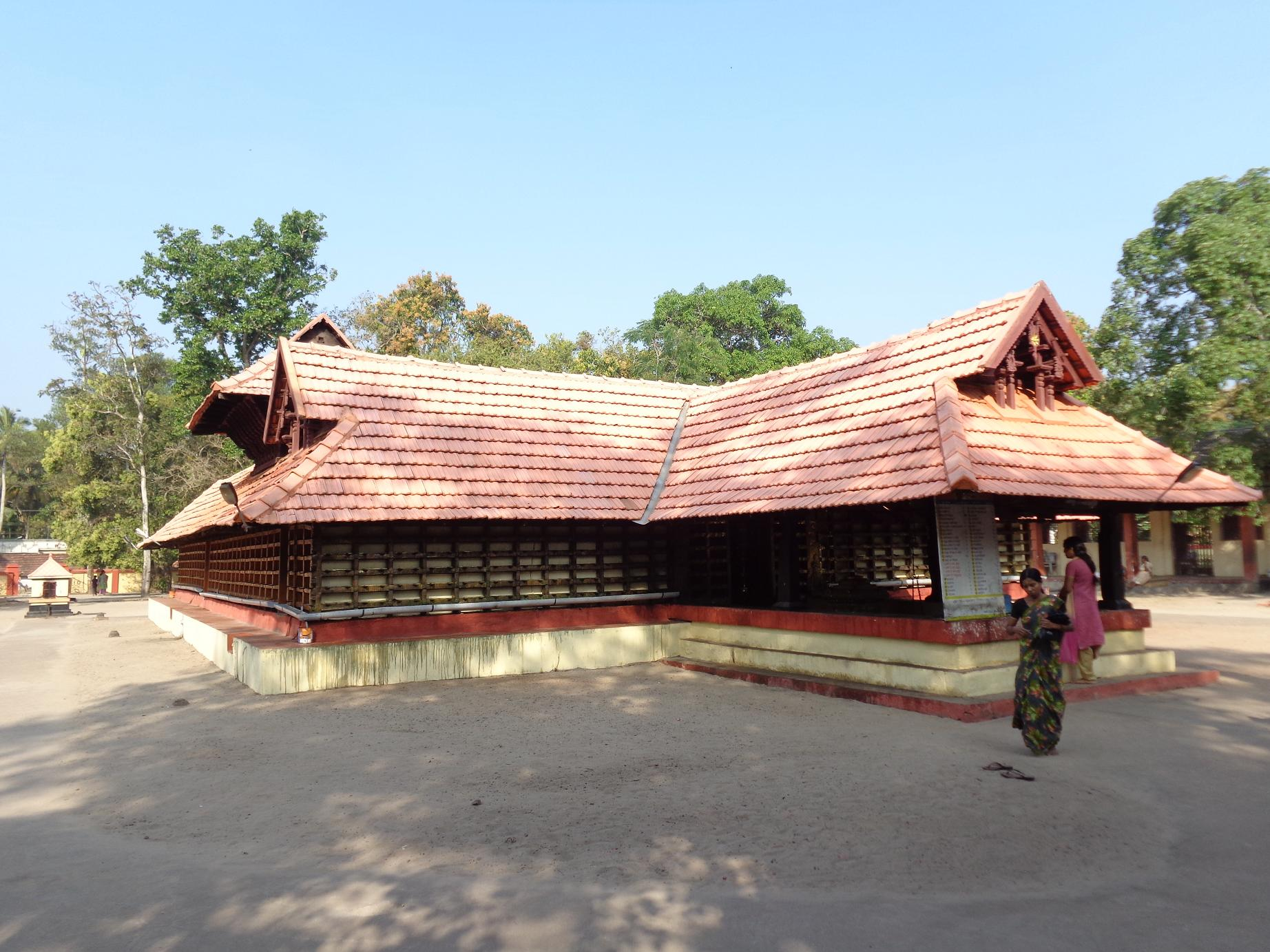
Pandavarkavu Devi Temple

Muthukulam is a village and census town near Haripad in Alappuzha district in the Indian state of Kerala.

== Demographics ==
As of 2011 India Census, Muthukulam had a population of 20,740 with 9,474 males and 11,266 females. The population of children aged 0-6 is 1719 which is 8.29% of total population of Muthukulam. In Muthukulam, female sex ratio is 1189 against state average of 1084. Moreover, the child sex ratio in Muthukulam is around 852 compared to Kerala state average of 964. literacy rate of Muthukulam is 95.73% higher than the state average of 94.00%. In Muthukulam, male literacy is around 97.48% while the female literacy rate is 94.29%.

Out of total population, 6,505 were engaged in work related to Primary sector or business activity. Of this 4,242 were males while 2,263 were females. Of total 6505 working population, 72.85% were engaged in Main Work while 27.15% of total workers were engaged in Marginal Work.

Muthukulam has total administration over 5,692 houses to which it supplies basic amenities like water, electricity and sewerage. It is also authorised to build roads within its limits and impose taxes on properties coming under its jurisdiction.

== Notable sites ==
The Rajiv Gandhi Combined Cycle Power Plant, RGCCPP (aka National Thermal Power Corporation) is at Choolatheruvu in Muthukulam.

== Notable people ==
- Muthukulam Raghavan Pillai: Malayalam film writer
- Padmarajan: Malayalam film director
- Muthukulam Parvathy Amma, Malayalam poet and activist
- Navya Nair, Indian actress
