= Haripad =

- Municipality
- Location in Kerala, India Haripad (India)
- Coordinates: 9°18′0″N 76°28′0″E
- Country: India
- State: Kerala
- District: Alappuzha
- Municipality: 2015

Government
  - Type: Grade 3 Municipality
  - Body: Haripad Municipality
  - Chairperson: K K Ramakrishnan
  - MLA: Ramesh Chennithala of INC

Area
  - Total: 19.24 km^{2} (7.43 sq mi)

Population
  - Total: 30,977
  - Density: 1,610/km^{2} (4,170/sq mi)

Languages
  - Official: Malayalam, English
- Time zone: UTC+5:30 (IST)
- PIN: 690514
- Telephone code: 0479
- Vehicle registration: KL-29
- Nearest city: Alappuzha
- Lok Sabha Constituency: Alappuzha
- Website: https://haripadmunicipality.lsgkerala.gov.in/en/

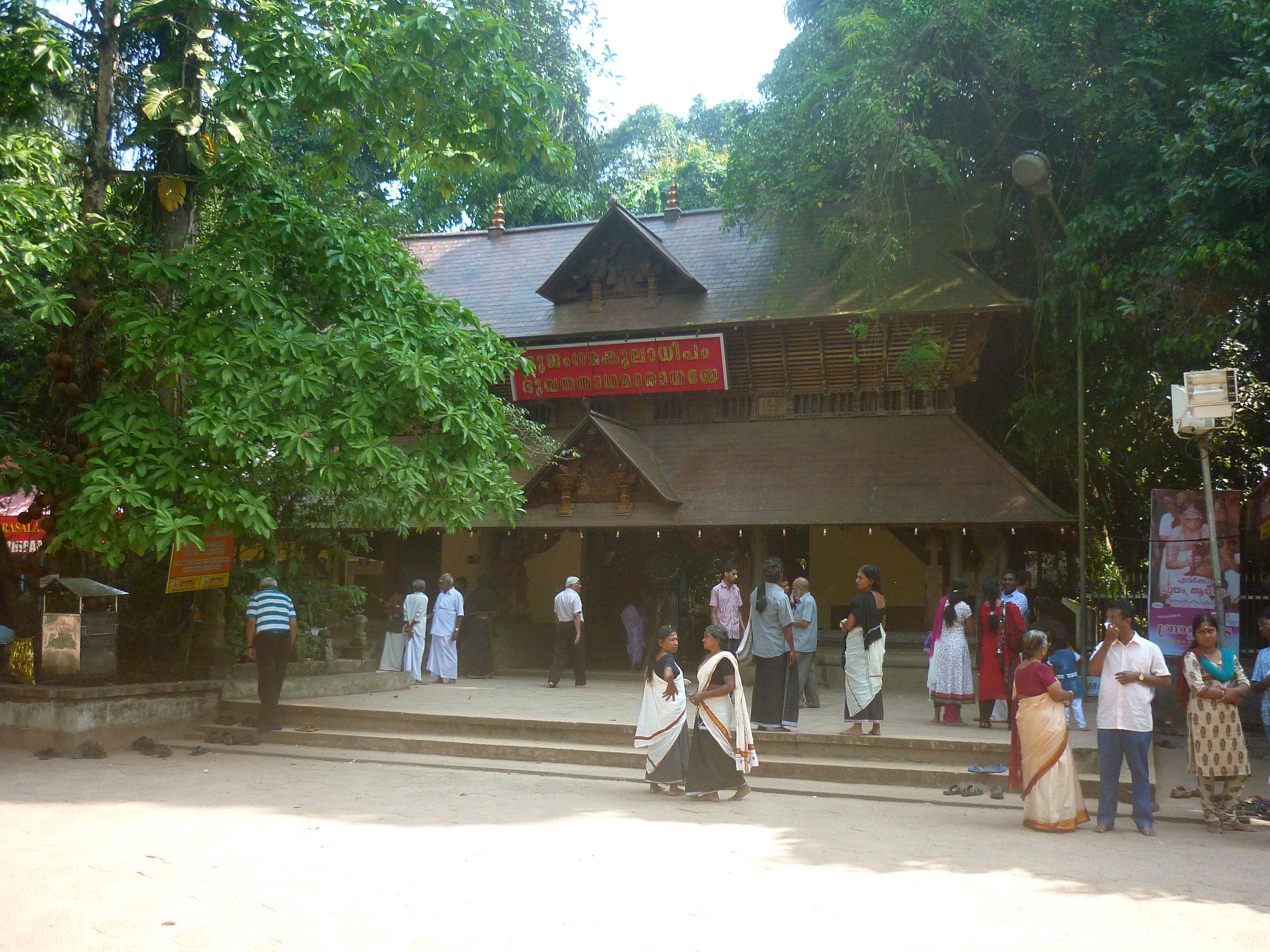
Mannarasala Temple

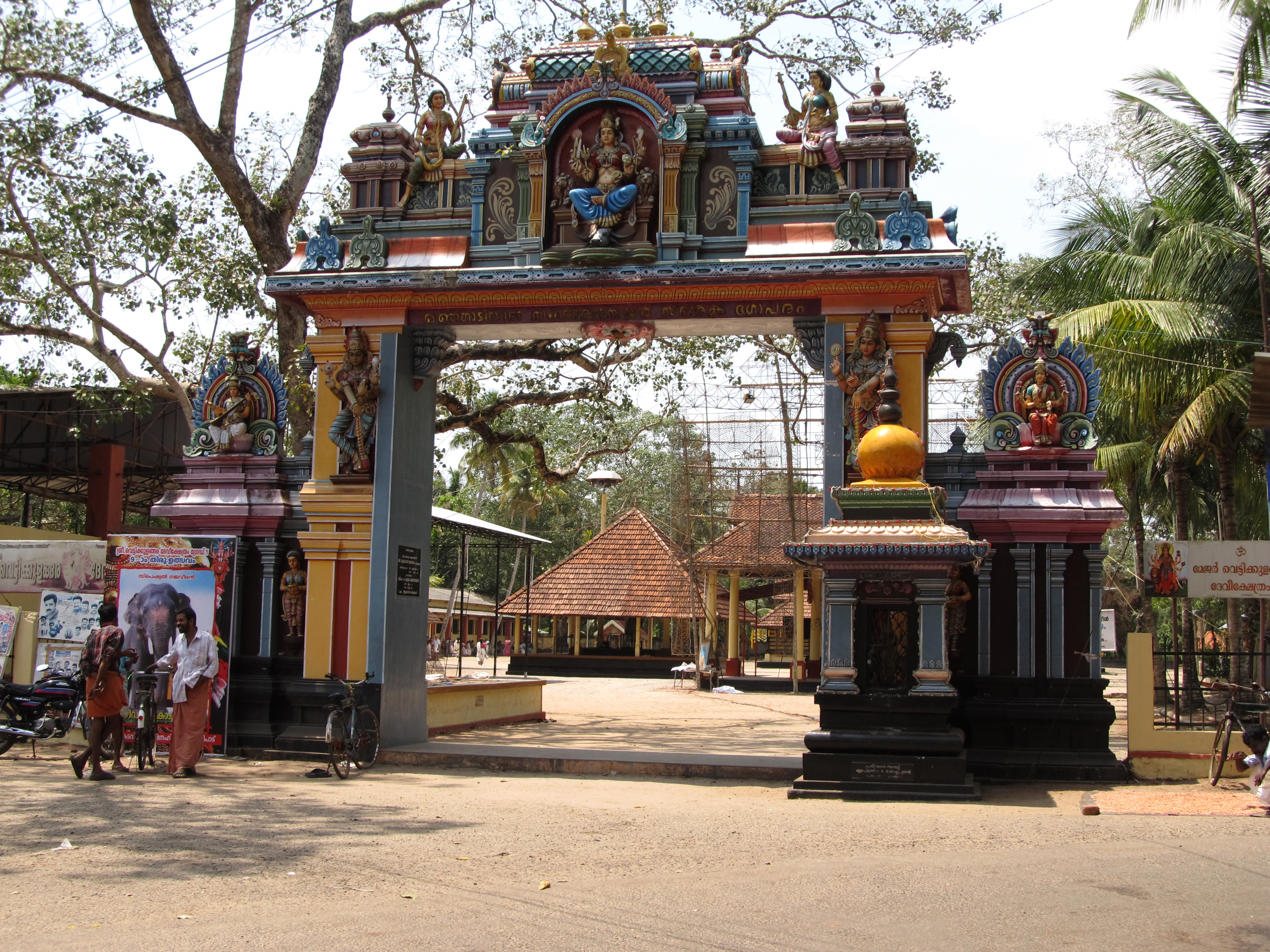
Vettikkulangara Temple

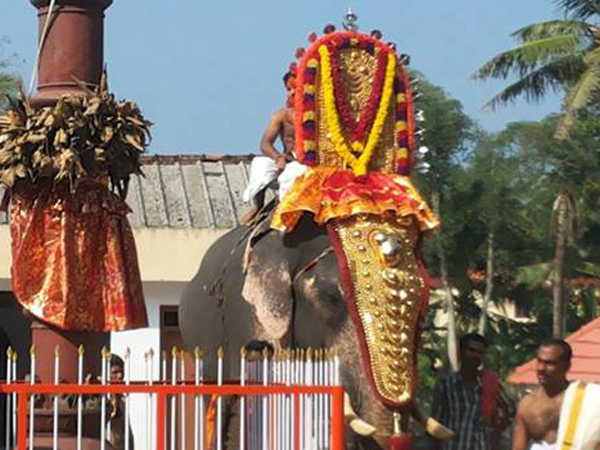
Manacattu Temple

Haripad is a municipality in Onattukara region of Alappuzha District, Kerala, India. It is known as the land of art, artists, land of snake boats, land of music, dance and drama. Due to town with highest number of temples in kerala, it is also popularly known as Kshetranagari (Town of Temples) in which Haripad Temple and Mannarasala Temple being the chief one among them. One of the largest thermal power plants in Kerala, the Rajiv Gandhi Combined Cycle Power Plant run by the NTPC, is situated at Haripad.

Haripad is a primary economic and cultural hub of the Onattukara region and Alappuzha district. It is famous for its religious and cultural heritage, and is a centre for Hindu culture.

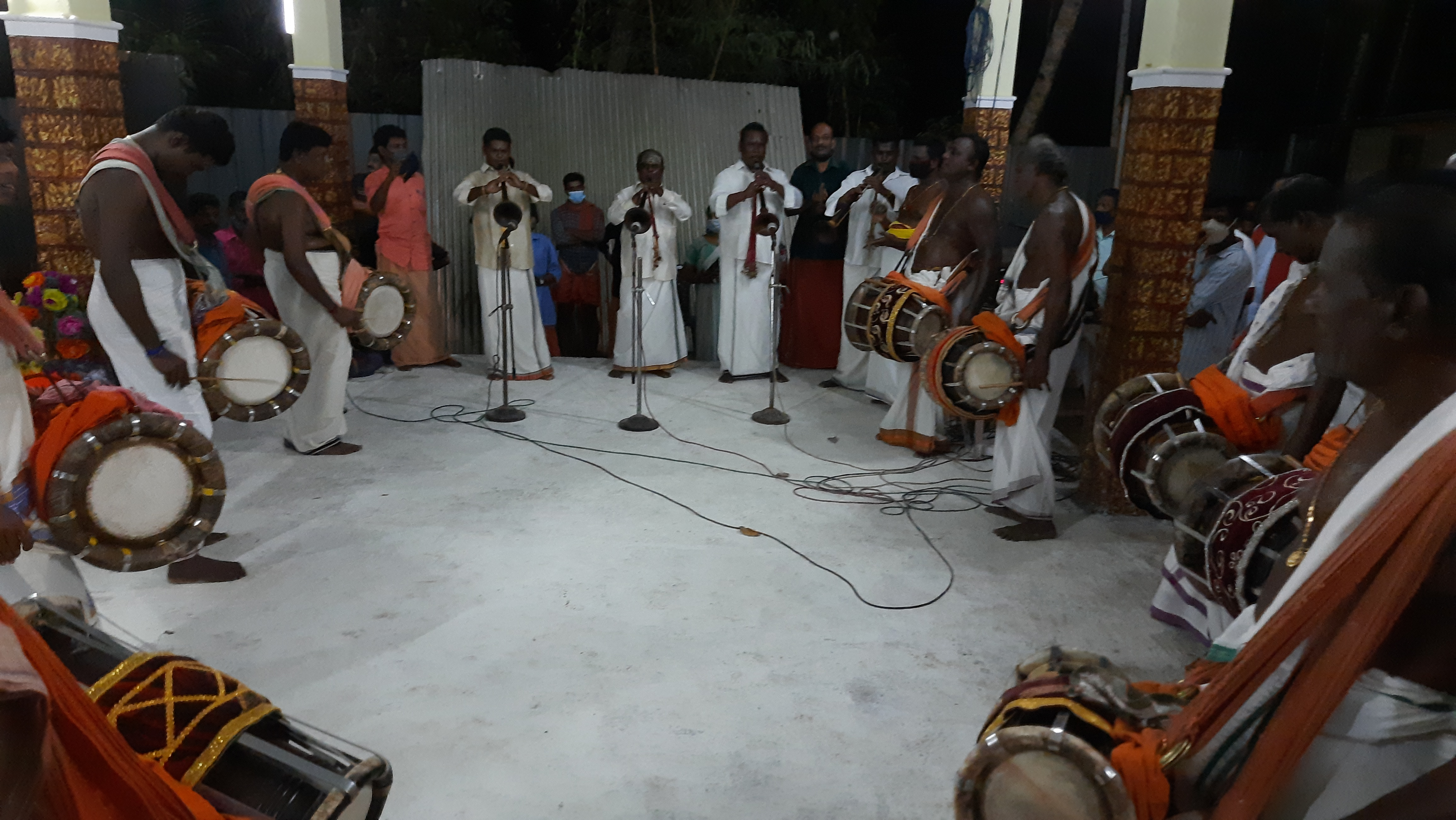
Pampa Melam at Panachamoodu temple [kavadi]

== History ==
Earlier it was known as Arippatt, the name Haripad came into prominence only in the 20th century. Some scholars say that it means place near water (ari- arike pat place). During the period of European colonization, In the opinion of the Dutch Governor Gollanez the sea coast between Quilon and Purakkad which the Dutch called "Martha" and which region was known as Karthikappally consisted of two regions or nation states, Karnoppally (present-day Karunagapally) and Karimpali.

The capital of Vettimana was Karimpalil palace (near the present-day Haripad Railway Station), but at some point it was moved to Karthikappally. In 1742 Marthanda Varma defeated Karthikappally region and added it to Travancore State. During the period of the kingship, Haripad was a town, the remaining town hall stands as proof.

== Geography ==
Haripad is a town and municipality in Alappuzha District of Kerala State in India. Its coordinates are Latitude: 9°18′0″N and Longitude: 76°28′0″E, and lies at an elevation of 13 meters. It is bordered on the east by Pallippad, Karuvatta to the north, Kumarapuram and Mahadevikadu to the West, and on the south by Cheppad. Haripad is close to the Arabian Sea and connects Mavelikkara and Thrikkunnappuzha. Haripad Railway station is located in the heart of the town. The nearest airport is at Kochi which is at a 3 h 5 min away (114.1 km) via NH66.

Being located in southwestern India, the summer months are characterized by moderately high temperature and high humidity. Monsoon brings rains between late April and July with the best weather being from November to March. As Haripad locates close to the coast heavy annual rainfall is received.

== Arts and culture ==
The two most famous temples in Haripad are Subrahmanya Swamy temple and Mannarasala Temple.

The Subrahmanya Swamy temple in Haripad is one of the oldest temples in Kerala,This temple is also known as "Dakshina Palani" which means Palani of south. Dedicated to Subrahmanya Swamy, it is believed that the temple was established even before the advent of Kali Yuga. The temple was consecrated on the Pushya star of Makara Masa. This day is celebrated as the founding day of the temple every year. It is believed that Vishnu appreaded as a saint to consecrate the temple. In 1096 of the Malayalam calendar, the temple caught fire, but the golden flag mast (erected 1067) and the Koothambalam were saved from the fire. The current temple was built during the period of King Chithira Thirunal Balarama Varma, who reigned from 1930 to 1949 (Gregorian Calendar). This temple holds three festivals yearly. The Chithira Ulsavam which starts on the day of Vishu and lasts ten days.

The Mannarasala Temple is a Nagaraja temple situated near Haripad. Like most snake temples, it is nestled in a forest glade, and has over 30,000 images of snakes along the paths and among the trees. It is the largest such temple in Kerala. Women seeking fertility come to worship there, and upon the birth of their child, they come again to hold thanksgiving ceremonies, often bringing new snake images as offerings.

Another main feature of Haripad which attracts even the foreigners is the Payippad Jalolsavam, a three-day water festival conducted on the nearby Payippad Lake. It is believed the idol of Subrahmanya was brought from Kandalloor with escort of snake boats and vallasadya. Payippad Jalolsavam is conducted to renew this memory.

== Government ==
Haripad is the headquarters of Karthikappally taluk, which includes 18 small villages: Arattupuzha, Cheppad, Cheruthana, Chingoli, Haripad, Kandallor, Mahadevikad, Karthikappally, Karuvatta, Keerikkad, Krishnapuram, Kumarapuram, Muthukulam, Pallippad, Pathiyoor, Puthuppally, Thrikkunnapuzha and Veeyapuram.

These all places come together to form the Haripad Legislative Assembly Constituency. The current MLA of Haripad Assembly Constituency is Shri Ramesh Chennithala of Indian National Congress .

The Haripad Assembly Constituency is part of Alappuzha (Lok Sabha constituency). K. C. Venugopal of Indian National Congress is the current MP of Alappuzha.

== Notable people ==
- Ashokan (1961–), actor
- Ramesh Chennithala, present MLA of Haripad, Former Home Minister
- V. Dakshinamoorthy (1919–2013), carnatic musician
- K. S. Harisankar (1993-), singer
- Lopamudra R., poet, translator, Kendra Sahitya Akademi Yuva Puraskar and OV Vijayan Sahitya Award, Thunjan Smaraka Award Winner
- Meena Joseph (1941–1997), actress
- T. K. Madhavan (1885–1930), social reformer
- K. Madhu (1953–), director
- Madhu Muttam (1951–), script writer
- Navya Nair (1985-) film actress
- Nirmalananda (1863–1938), a direct monastic disciple of Sri Ramakrishna (1836–1886)
- K. Omanakutty (1943–), musician
- K. S. Harisankar (1993-), singer
- Padmarajan (1945–1991), Malayalam film director and writer
- Rajesh Pillai (1974–2016), film director
- M. G. Radhakrishnan (1940–2010), carnatic musician
- Sangeeth Sivan (1959–2024), film director
- Santhosh Sivan (1964–), cinematographer
- M. G. Sreekumar (1957–), musician, singer, music director
- Mallika Sukumaran (1954–), actress
- Erickavu N. Sunil (1977-), National award-winning Mridangam artist, author
- Sreekumaran Thampi (1940–), writer, lyricist
- Kerala Varma Valiya Koil Thampuran (1845–1914) author of Mayurasandesa, stayed in Haripad while writing the Mayura Sandesam which were love letters to his wife sent using peacocks.
- A. P. Udhayabhanu (1915–1999), Congress leader, writer
- C. B. C. Warrier (1932–2013), Ex-MLA, CPM Leader
- Nishadh Yusuf (1981-2024), film editor
