= Humguti =

Bangladeshi team game

Humguti / Pohura
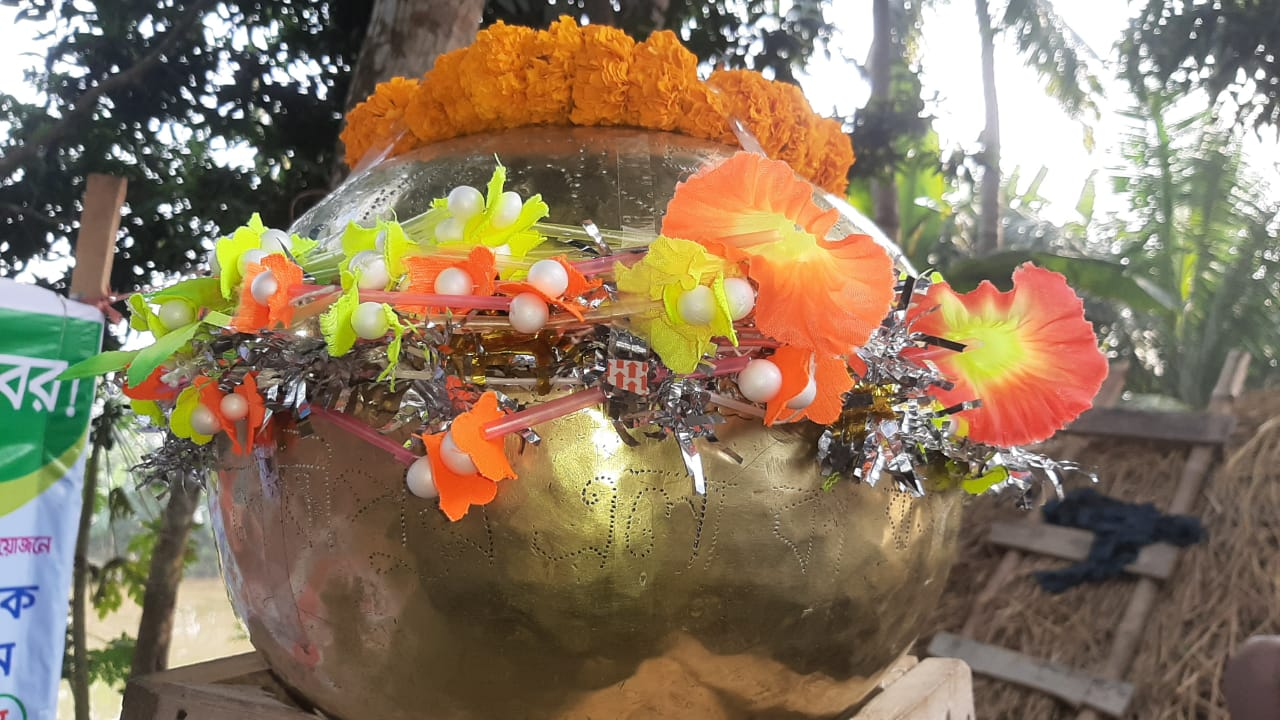
- The brass Humguti ball used in the game

Characteristics
- Team members: Current Champion - Katakhali (3 consecutive wins), 2025
- Type: Team sport
- Equipment: Humguti (brass ball)
- Venue: Boro Ata Bandh field, Fulbaria Upazila, Mymensingh District

Presence
- Country or region: Fulbaria Upazila, Mymensingh District, Bangladesh

Humguti (also known as Pohura) is a centuries-old traditional team game and rural festival of Bangladesh, centered around an intense competition to capture and hide a heavy brass ball. The game originated over 250 years ago in Mymensingh District as a creative way to resolve land measurement disputes between local landlords. Today, it is celebrated annually as a vibrant festival of strength, teamwork, and community spirit, drawing thousands of participants and spectators from surrounding villages.

== History ==
About 250 years ago, a dispute over land measurement arose between Raja Shashikanta Acharya of Muktagacha Upazila and Zamindar Hemchandra Roy of Trishal Upazila. Taluk lands were measured at 10 decimals per Katha, while Pargana lands were measured at 6.5 decimals per Katha, causing discontent among the peasants. To peacefully resolve this issue, the landlords arranged a ball game where the victorious side would claim the contested land as 'Taluk,' while the losing side would be designated as 'Pargana.' The game was held in Lakshmipur village at the Boro Ata field, and the peasants of the Muktagacha landlord won that inaugural match.

Today, the local Morol family continues to organize this annual event.

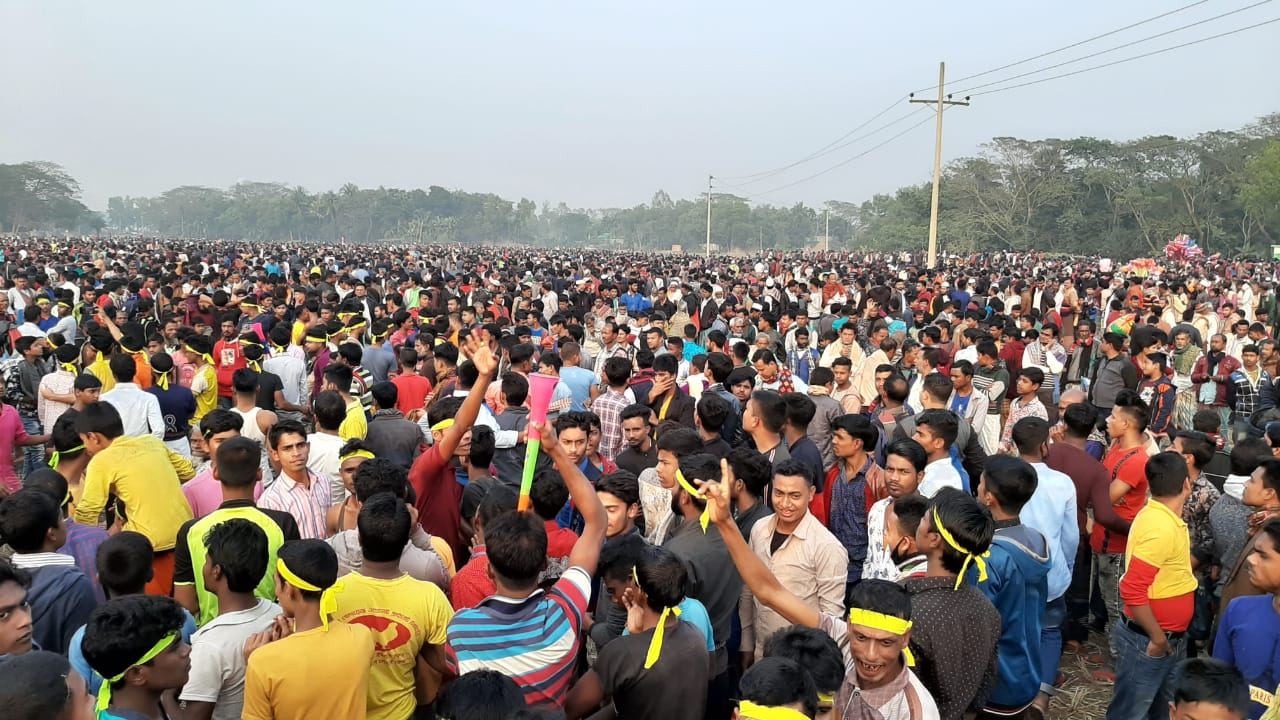
Players and spectators at the Humguti game in 2020

== Ball ==
The Humguti is a spherical brass ball weighing around 40 kg. Its shape resembles the rounded bottom of a large brass pot, filled and compacted with earth to make it extremely heavy and solid. During the game, thousands of villagers rush to seize control of the ball while shouting, *"Jeet-i aba diya guti dhor-re heyo..."* ("Victory to the one who catches the ball!").

== Game day ==
The game is traditionally held on the last day of the Bengali month of Poush, known locally as Pohura. It begins around 4:15 PM and often continues late into the night, sometimes extending into the next day with the aid of torchlight.

== Game field ==
The main playing field is Boro Ata Bandh, about 5 km north of Fulbaria Upazila headquarters, located between Lakshmipur and 10 Mile. This site historically marked the boundary between Taluk and Pargana lands.

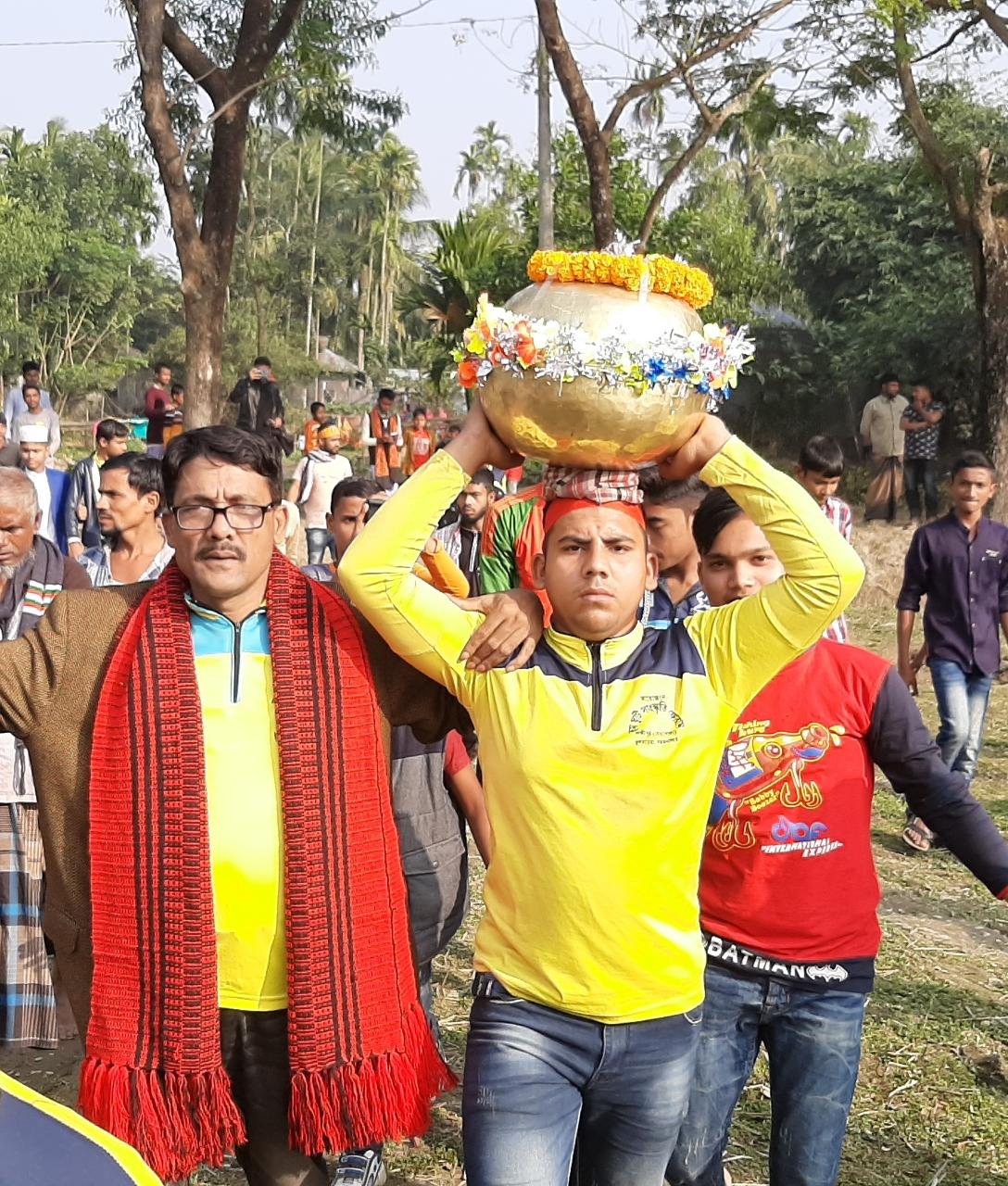
Bringing out the Humguti ball after the game

== Rules ==
The objective of the game is to capture the approximately 40 kg brass ball and smuggle it back to a team's own village. The game begins with teams informally divided by cardinal directions (north, south, east, and west), but as the competition progresses, it turns into a free-for-all with no fixed teams. Each village's players wear specific insignia or markers to identify their side.

As soon as the ball is placed on the field, tens of thousands of participants rush in to seize it, resulting in pushing, pulling, and wrestling as they attempt to take control. The game can spread across an area of 5–8 km, as players from distant villages try to transport the ball back to their own village.

There are no official referees; players themselves enforce the rules and declare victory. The game continues until one team successfully smuggles the ball into their village boundary, at which point they are declared the winners.

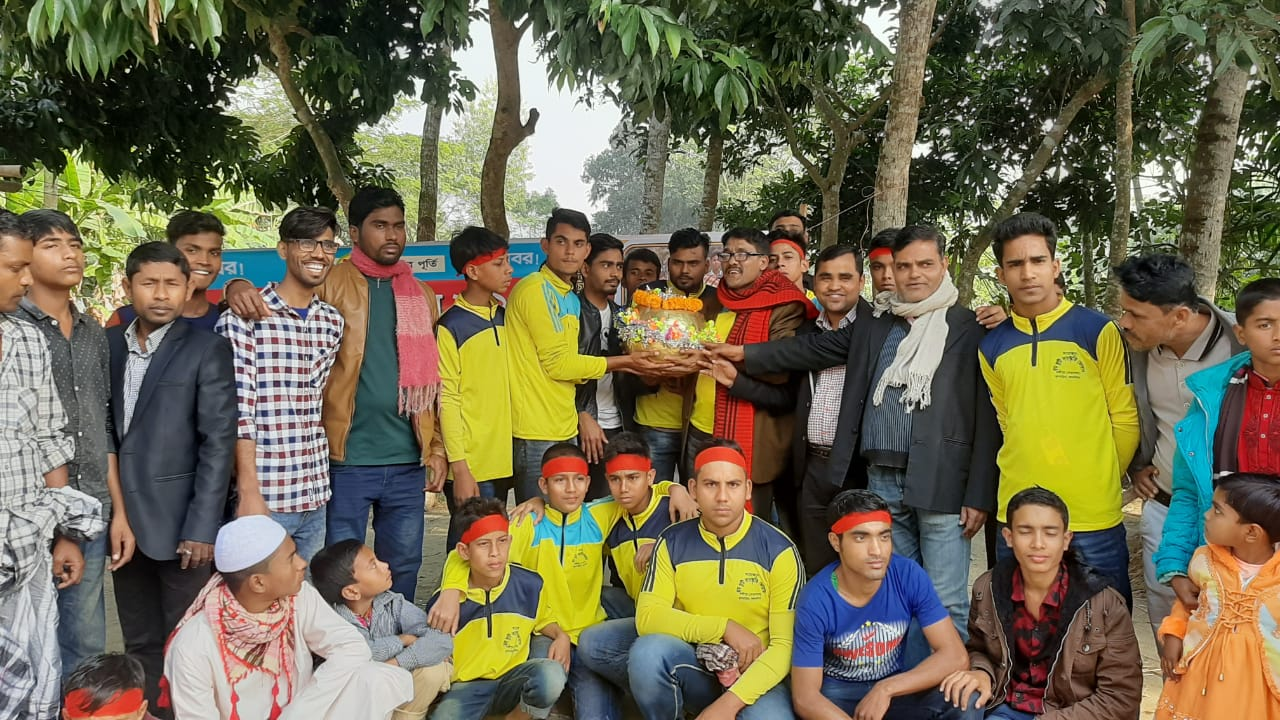
Winners of the Humguti game, 2020

== Participants ==
Players come from surrounding areas such as Mymensingh Sadar Upazila, Muktagacha Upazila, Trishal Upazila, and Fulbaria Upazila.

== End of the game ==
The game concludes when a team successfully brings the ball back into its village boundary. The winning team parades the ball through their village and celebrates with a grand feast. The ball remains on display in the winning village for the rest of the year. However, the expansion of modern agriculture and the reduction of large open fields have made organizing the game increasingly difficult.

== Festival ==
The Humguti game is the centerpiece of a larger regional festival celebrated in 14–15 villages, including Lakshmipur, Katakhali, Boro Ata, Balashwar, Shubhoria, Kalibazail, Teligram, Sarutia, Garbazail, Basna, Deokhola, Kukrail, Boruka, Fulbaria town, Andhariapara, Jorbaria, Choudhar, Dasbari, and Katalasen.

The game draws large crowds, and villages prepare festive meals, including beef and mutton. Families bake traditional sweets, and many villagers purchase new clothing for the occasion.

== See also ==
- Gollachhut
- Dariyabanhda
- Bouchi
- Kanamachi
