= Gollachhut =

Bangladeshi traditional game

Gollachhut (Bengali: গোল্লাছুট; circle run) is one of the most popular games among adolescents in Bangladesh. In addition to rural areas, the game is also widely played in urban settings. It is especially popular in Dhaka, Mymensingh, Faridpur, Madaripur, Barisal, Khulna, and Pabna. Children typically play Gollachhut outdoors, such as in school fields or open spaces. The game is played between two teams. A stick is planted in a hole in the ground to serve as the central point of the game. A circle is drawn around this stick, and a boundary line is marked about 25 to 30 feet away.

== Etymology ==
The name derives from the nature of the game. Players must move in a circle ("golla"), and "chhut" is a regional word meaning "run." Thus, the game is called "Gollachhut."

== Rules ==
At the start of the game, two team captains are selected, known as "Goda." Each team consists of an equal number of players (usually 5 or 7). The team captain holds the planted stick with one hand and links hands with their teammates with the other hand, forming a chain. Together, they rotate around the central stick.

The objective of the game is to break the chain and run towards a secondary target (another stick or tree located outside the circle) and touch it.

While attempting to run out of the circle and reach the target, players must avoid being tagged by members of the opposing team. If a player is tagged before touching the target, they are eliminated from that round. Ultimately, the team captain must also attempt to reach the target. If none of the players from the attacking team reaches the target, the opposing team wins that round.

== See also ==
- Dariyabandha
- Kanamachi
- Bouchi
