= Bengali traditional games =

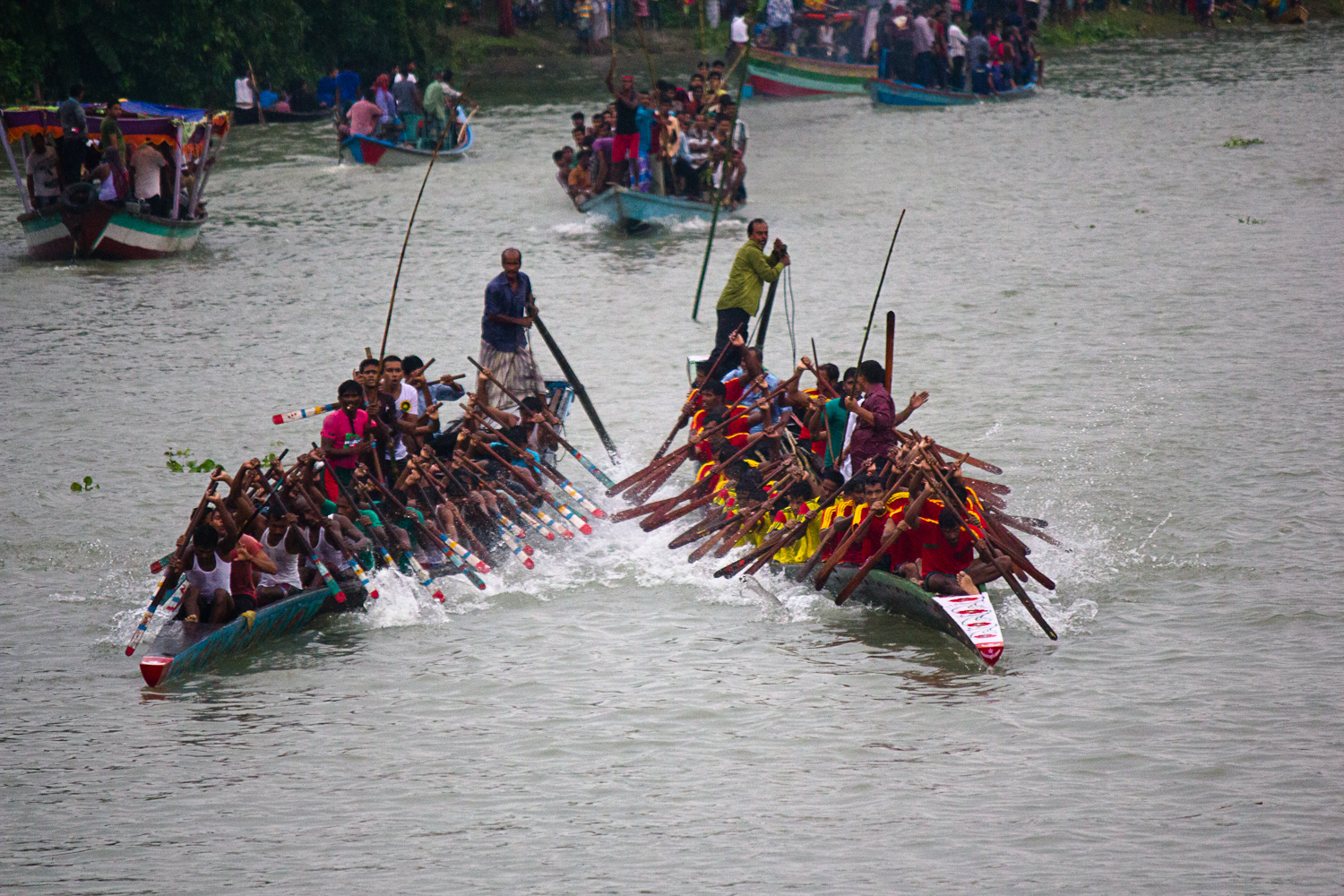
Nouka Baich, traditional boat racing in Bangladesh

Bengali traditional games are traditional games that are played in rural parts of the historical region of Bengal (present-day Bangladesh and the Indian state of West Bengal). These games are typically played outside with limited resources. Many games have similarities to other traditional South Asian games.

Some traditional Bengali games are thousands of years old and reference historical ways of life. Due to urbanization, traditional Bengali games are declining in popularity.

== History ==
Like in other rural areas of Bengal, traditional games played an integral part in social and cultural life. A historical survey of folk games of North Bengal has been done which includes games like Gollachut, Ekka-dokka, Ekir-Mikir, Hamri, Agdum-Bagdum, Elating Belating Sailo and explained their growth in the historical context.

Traditional games are an integral aspect of the rural life of North Bengal, as highlighted in the study done on the games of the 20th century. There are many games that can be played using low cost local materials, so they will be affordable to children with a varied economic background.

Other games have decreased or vanished due to changes in recreation and social behaviour. The researchers have reported the disappearance of some of the traditional games in North Bengal and that globalization and the growing influence of modern sports and recreation have an impact on the survival of the traditional games.

== Boat racing ==
=== Nouka Baich ===
Nouka Baich (Bengali: নৌকা বাইচ, lit. Boat Race, also spelt Nowka Bais) is a traditional dragon boat-style paddling sport of Bangladesh. The Bangladesh Rowing Federation, established in 1974, is the authority of all rowing activities in Bangladesh and has organised over 40 National Rowing Championships. The races are held during the wet and autumn seasons of the Bengali calendar which corresponds from June to October in the Gregorian calendar. The "Nowka Bais" which takes place annually in Birmingham is a cultural event in the West Midlands, United Kingdom attracting not only the Bangladeshi diaspora but a variety of cultures. It is also the largest kind of boat race in the United Kingdom.

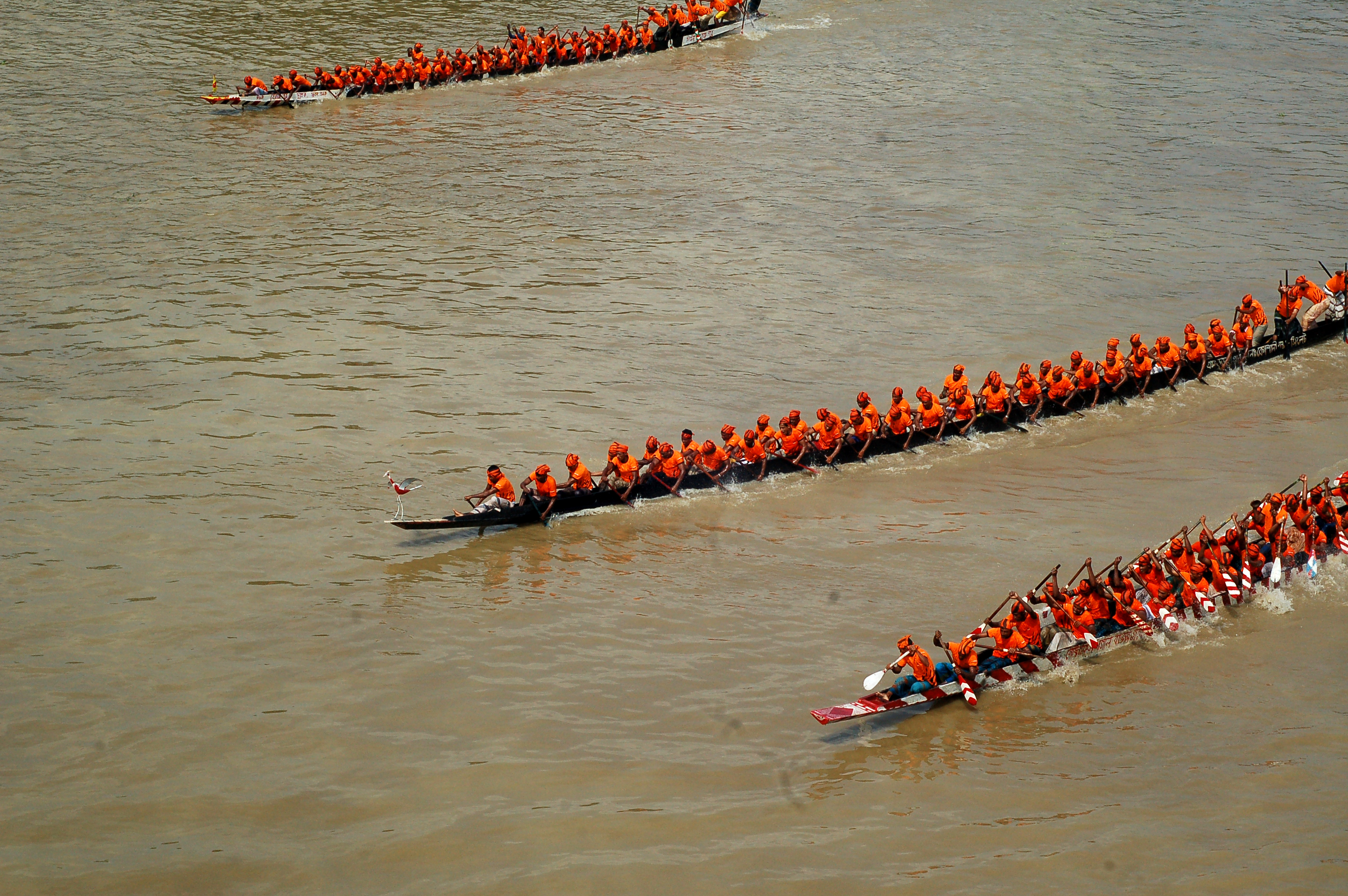
A large Nouka Baich competition taking place with over hundreds of participants.

With riverine Bangladesh's geography being dominated by the world's largest delta, the country has over 230 rivers in its terrain. The rivers have played an important role in the livelihoods of the native Bengali people.

Common in rural areas, Nouka Baich is a very old tradition of the folk Bengali culture going back centuries. Its popularity in urban areas increased in the 18th century. The various Nawab families throughout Mughal Bengal were also known for organising races and the use of Sari gan started to become more popular.

Nouka Baich was also common during the British rule in the Sylhet region after the rainy season when much of the land goes under water. The long canoes were referred to as khel naos (meaning playing boats) and the use of cymbals to accompany the singing was common.

== Martial arts ==
=== Boli Khela ===
Boli Khela, also known as Bali Khela (), and popularly known as Jobbarer Boli Khela (), is a traditional form of wrestling in Bangladesh. It is particularly popular in the Chittagong region, where it is regarded as the district's traditional national sport. This combat sport incorporates grappling techniques such as clinch fighting, throws and takedowns, joint locks, pins, and other grappling holds. It is one of Chittagong's oldest traditions. The event is held on the 7th day of the first month of the Bengali calendar at Madarsha Union as Mokkaro Boli Khela, and on the 12th day of the same month at Laldighi Maidan as Jabbarer Boli Khela.

Boli Khela was introduced in the 19th century by Kader Boxo, a landlord and resident of Satkania Upazila in the Madarsha Union of Chittagong District. Starting in 1879, he collected rent from his tenants each year and organized a Boli Khela match. After his death, the 7th of Boishakh (the first month of the Bengali calendar) became known as "Mokkaro Boli Khela."

The sport was popularized in the early 20th century by Abdul Jabbar Saodagor of Chittagong. It gained widespread appeal after World War I but declined after World War II.

=== Lathi khela ===
Lathi khela () is a traditional Bengali martial art – a kind of stick fighting practiced in India and Bangladesh. A practitioner is known as a lathial. Lathi khela originated from the Bengal region in the Indian subcontinent.

Rich farmers and other eminent people hired lathial for security and as a symbol of their power. Duels were used as a way to protect or take land and other possessions. A proverb in some South Asian languages is jiski lathi uski bhains meaning "whoever wields the lathi keeps the buffalo". Zamindars (feudal lords) sent groups of lathial to forcefully collect taxes from villagers. Lathi training was at one time included in the Bratachari system of education.

During the 19th century, organisers of the Hindu Mela came together to form a secret society, the Sanjivani Sabha, which manufactured swadeshi matchsticks and cloth woven in swadeshi looms. The Hindu mela also provided considerable exposure to indigenous physical sports. In the first session of the mela, renowned wrestlers in Calcutta were invited and awarded medals. In the following session, competitions for indigenous physical sports such as wrestling and Lathi khela, were organised. Various displays of Indian martial arts and survival techniques were also prominently featured at the mela.

Although Lathi khela is practised in Indian and Bangladeshi villages, urbanization has led to its decline as a rural martial art in recent decades. Until 1989, an annual nationwide lathi khela convention was held in Kushtia, Bangladesh, where troupes from all over the country took part. Due to the drop in practitioners and spectators, the convention is now held once every three years. Even in the districts where lathi troupes once flourished, only several now remain. Today, lathi khela is most often seen during festivals and weddings. Matches are held in West Bengal for certain puja rituals, and a similar sport called chamdi is played during Eid in North Bengal.

=== Butthan ===
Butthan (ব্যুত্থান, bʊθɑːn, meaning "Defense with distinction and awakening") is a Bangladeshi martial art and combat sport. It is a system of self-defense and personal development rooted in South Asian heritage. Butthan has been developed by Mak Yuree, an internationally acclaimed Grandmaster and known as Superhuman as dubbed by the Discovery Channel. It has been described as the ‘noble art of stopping-fight and enlightenment that produces physical, mental and spiritual balance’. Butthan was approved as a national sport of Bangladesh by the National Sports Council, Ministry of Youth and Sports in Bangladesh in 2013. As a combat sport, the martial art is practiced in different parts of the world under the International Butthan Federation.

== Throwing games ==
=== Chungakhela ===
Chungakhela is typically played in Chittagong by adults. The players throw firecrackers at each other, attempting to hit their opponents. As a result, players may be burnt while partaking in the game.

=== Gaigodani ===
Gaigodani is played with one player throwing a stick onto a muddy surface, trying to lodge the stick upright in the mud. A second player throws their stick, attempting to make the first stick either fall to the ground or end up parallel to the first stick. If the second player fails, the first player attempts the same, with the two alternating until one of them succeeds. The winner retains both sticks and then challenges a third player in the same fashion, and so on. Once one player has all the sticks, the player throws the sticks and hides their own stick. Then, each opponent attempts to retrieve a thrown stick and touch the hidden stick. The last opponent to do so loses.

=== Satchara/Satchada/Pittu (Bengali: সাতচারা, সাতচাড়া, পিট্টু,(lit. 'Seven Stones') ===
Seven stones is one of the most ancient games originating from the Indian subcontinent. Its history dates back to the Bhagavata Purana, a Hindu religious text, which mentions Lord Krishna, a major deity in Hinduism, playing the game with his friends.

== Bat-and-ball games ==
=== Gulli danda ===
Gulli danda (Bengali: গুল্লি ডাণ্ডা), also known as danguli khela, is usually played by boys. It is played with a small piece of wood called a gulli, and another stick called a danda. The danda is used to hit the gulli, which the opposing player tries to catch.

The sport of gillidanda is derived from ghaṭikā, literally "tip-cat". Ghatika is still known to countries Pakistan most famous in Punjab from the Indian subcontinent and south Asian countries like Bangladesh and India. In Bangladesh, it is known as gilli danda while in Nepali, it is known as dandi biyo (डण्डी बियो), which is a similar game. The longer stick in ḍāṅguli khelā should be about 1 1/2 ft (0.46 m) and the shorter stick about 6 in (150 mm). There are certain rules for preparing the sticks and playing the game with them. Gillidanda traces its roots back to ancient India. The game has been played for centuries and holds cultural significance. It was not only a source of recreation but also a way to develop physical agility and coordination among players.

== Hopscotch games ==
=== Ekka-dokka ===
Ekka-dokka (Bengali: এক্কা-দোক্কা), known locally as guti (গুটি), is typically played by women. It is played with either a smaller, broken piece of an earthen pot or flat clay that is rectangular or circular. On the ground, a large box long is drawn and is then divided into six smaller boxes. Every box has a common name, such as ek-er ghor for the first box, dui-er ghor for the second box, and so on up to five boxes, with the last box being known as samundra. The players roll their guti (playing piece) into the first box. After that, the player rotates the guti with their toes into the second box, the second box into the third box, and so on, until it reaches the fifth box. Then, the player rotates the guti back towards their starting position. After completing one round, they roll the guti again, starting at the second box. While rolling the guti, a player sings a melody called ekka-dokka. A player may be eliminated if they choose the incorrect box, leave their playing area, place both of their feet inside the box, or if their guti falls on the line.

== Roleplaying games ==
=== Raja-chor-mantri-sipahi ===
Raja-chor-mantri-sipahi (Bengali: রাজা-মন্ত্রী-চোর-সিপাহি) is usually played among boys and girls. Four players are needed to play this game, who each take up a role. The four roles are Raja (King), Mantri (Minister), chor (thief) and sipahi (soldier). Each character has different points. Raja has 1000 points, the mantri has 500 points, sipahi has 100 points, and Chor has 0 points. These roles are randomly chosen by writing the roles on a small sheet of paper and tossing them in the middle of the four players. The player who gets Raja gives the order to Mantri to find out who is the chor from the remaining two players. Mantri receives points if he correctly finds the chor. Otherwise, Mantri's points will be zero, and the points of Mantri go to the chor. Rounds repeat this way, and points are recorded in a note. To end, the points are tallied and the player with the most points is declared the winner.

== Pull-and-push games ==
=== Ayanga-ayanga ===
One player, who is given the role as the "tiger", leaps forward and tries to grab any of the other players, who are given the role of "goats", to drag them out of the circle they are stationed within. The last player remaining within the circle becomes the tiger in the next round.

=== Chikka ===
In Chikka, also known as "tug and trip", there are two teams who assemble across either side of a dividing line. Each team player attempts to trip the opposing team player by pulling and pushing each other, their opponent falls onto the other side of the line.

=== Elating Belating ===
In Elating Belating, there are two teams who each form a line by holding hands and facing each other. Each team steps forward while saying a rhyme. Once the rhyme is completed by one team, the players try to grab one of the players on the opposing team. If the grabbing team can successfully take an opposing player away, the grabbing team are the victors.

=== Morog Lorai ===
In Morog Lorai, players must hop on one foot and attempt to knock down other players to eliminate them. The last remaining player wins the game.

=== Openti Bioscope ===
In Openti Bioscope, two players form a "gate" by holding hands. The two players sing a rhyme, while the other players attempt to go through the gate before it is lowered, which occurs at the completion of the rhyme.

== Variations of Tag ==
=== Bouchi ===
Baucchi (also spelled Bouchi or Boucchi) is a game where one player, the "bride", stays in an area some distance away from the "bride-snatching" team's area. In variations of the game, the bride may instead be considered an "old lady". The bride-snatchers can leave their area to tag players on the "bride-protecting" team and eliminate them, but the bride-snatchers must hold their breath while doing so; otherwise the bride-snatchers themselves can be tagged out by the protectors. Once the bride-snatchers have run out of breath and tagged out as many opponents as possible, the bride must run to the bride-snatchers' area without being tagged by the remaining protectors.

=== Borof Paani ===
Borof Paani is the Bengali version of freeze tag.

=== Chhi-chhattar ===
In Chhi-chhattar, one player (the "kite") is surrounded by all other players (the "cocks"). The cocks form a human chain by holding hands. The kite can attempt to run out of the circle of players, and the first player to chase after and tag the kite becomes the kite in the next round.

=== Dariabandha ===
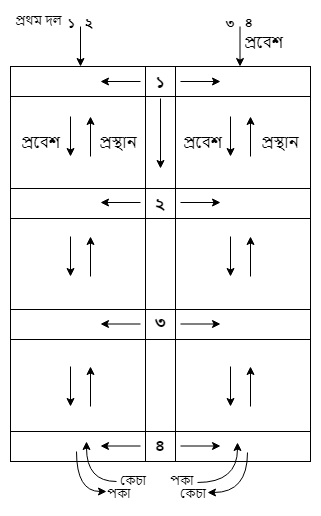
Standard court layout for Dariyabanda game

Dariyabanda (Bengali: দাড়িয়াবান্ধা) is a well-known traditional rural sport of Bangladesh. The game is played throughout the country with variations according to local customs and rules. The National Recreation Association of Bangladesh has formulated an accepted set of rules for the game. Children across almost all regions enjoy playing Dariyabanda, and it is also popular among both boys and girls, as well as adults.

=== Golap Tagar ===
Also known as Phul Tokka, players are separated by an equal distance from a dividing boundary line. Players are alternately blindfolded and then asked to guess which player on the other team has touched them on the forehead. When players guess correctly, they are allowed to take a jump forward. When a player guesses incorrectly, the opponent that touched them on the forehead gets to take a leap forward. The first team to get a player over the dividing line wins.

=== Gollachut ===
In Gollachut or Gollachhut, a stick is placed in the center of a 20-metre circle, and players on the king's team (generally eight to ten players) form a chain by holding hands, while one of these players holding onto the stick. The players then, as a chain, start to circle the stick. Some of them then break off from the chain, with the goal of running out of the circle without being tagged by opponents.

The game is believed to be reminiscent of laborers or slaves attempting to escape doing agricultural work (i.e. grinding crops in a farmhouse).

=== Ha-du-du/Kabaddi ===
Kabaddi (Note: Pronunciation: /kəˈbædi/, or /ˈkʌbədi/) is a contact sport played between two teams of seven players each. It is one of the traditional games of South Asia. Though it is more popular in Asia, it is played in several countries across the world. Although evidences of a sport similar to modern kabaddi is found in ancient Indian texts, the rules of modern kabaddi were framed in the 1920s in India and the game was popularised as a competitive sport in the late 20th century.

The exact origin of the sport has been unclear, though it probably originated in the Indian Subcontinent, about four thousand years ago. It may have originated in prehistoric times, when humans formed groups to protect themselves from predators and to hunt animals or perhaps as a way of demonstrating bravery. As per Ronojoy Sen, kabaddi originated during the Vedic period (between 1500 and 500 BCE).

In the Hindu epic Mahabharata, during the Kurukshetra War, Abhimanyu raids the Kaurava army and gets trapped in the Chakravyuha formation, which exhibits similarities to the modern day kabaddi. There are literary accounts of Krishna and Siddhartha Gautama having played an ancient form of the sport. Some form of the sport was played for physical exercise in vedic schools in ancient India. There are also accounts of kabaddi having originated in ancient Tamilakam, or in Persia.

=== Holdug ===
In Holdug, also known as "tag me in water", one player dives underwater, and the first opponent to tag the player takes their place in the next round of gameplay.

=== Kanamachi ===
Kanamachi (Bengali: কানামাছি, romanized: Kanamachhi, lit. 'Blind Fly', also spelt Kanamasi or Khanamasi) is a traditional game popular in Bangladesh and in the Indian states of West Bengal, Assam, Odisha and Tripura. It is played mainly by children and is one of the most popular games among Bangladeshi and West Bengal villagers. Children living in towns and cities also love the game in great amount. It is similar to the European game Blind man's buff.

=== Kho kho ===
Kho-kho is one of the more popular traditional Bengali games.

In the game, one player from the chasing team (the "active chaser" or "attacker") may run around the court to tag (touch) members of the defending team. Each successful tag earns one point, and tagged defenders must leave the field. However, the active chaser is restricted from crossing the central lane to access the other half of the court and cannot change direction once they begin running toward either pole. These restrictions can be bypassed if the active chaser either switches roles with a sitting teammate — by touching them on the back while saying "Kho" — who is facing the other half of the court, or by running behind either pole to switch direction or halves. Each team alternates between scoring and defending, with two turns for each role. Each turn lasts nine minutes, and the team with the highest score at the end of the game wins.

Kho kho has been played since at least the fourth century BC. Certain aspects of kho kho's gameplay may have been mentioned in the Mahabharata. In pre-modern times, it is believed that a version of kho kho known as Rathera was played on chariots (ratha meaning "chariot" in Sanskrit). The game was also known in ancient times as "Kho Dhwani Krida", translating as "a game where the sound 'kho' is made".

=== Kumir danga ===
In Kumir danga (Bengali: কুমির ডাঁঙ্গা), all but one player stands in a designated area. The players try to leave and stay outside of that area without being tagged by the player outside the area.

=== Langdi ===
In Langdi or Langdi tang, the tagger must hop on one foot, while their opponents must run within the confines of a small field.

Langdi is considered to be useful in training for sports like kho kho, volleyball and gymnastics. The National Langdi Federation received national recognition in 2010.

=== Lathie chhora ===
In Lathie chhora, players climb up a tree with one of them throwing a stick away from the tree. One player fetches the stick and then touches the tree. Meanwhile, all of the other players climb down the tree while trying to avoid being tagged by the stick-fetcher.

=== Nuntaa ===
Nuntaa (Bengali: নুনতা, also known as Bengali: কুতকুতে, romanized: Kutkute in South Bengal) is a Bangladeshi game that is played by children and teenagers in rural areas.In nuntaa, a child stands in a circle, and has to chase the others. It is usually played in groups.

=== Tilo Express ===
Tilo Express is similar to hide-and-seek, except the seeker must shout out the name of each person they find, followed by the word "express", to eliminate them. The uneliminated players are able to defeat the seeker by tagging them and shouting "tilo".

== Board games ==
=== Ludo ===
Ludo (/ˈljuːdoʊ/; from Latin ludo '[I] play') is a strategy-based board game for two to four (Note: In some countries (at least Denmark) a variant for six players is available, but it is uncommon. Also in Denmark, a 4-player variant called Partners is available, where the players compete in pairs in a Bridge-like manner.) players, in which the players race their four tokens from start to finish according to the rolls of a single die. Ludo shares characteristics with other cross-and-circle games from around the world; these types of games include the pre-Columbian Mesoamerican game Patolli, and the Indian game Pachisi. The game and its variations are popular in many countries and under various names.

Ludo uses a cubic die with a dice cup and was marketed as "Ludo" in England in 1896 by Alfred Coller. (Note: Patent number 14636.) Coller eventually patented the game and sold it as "Royal Ludo". The board game Uckers, popular in the Royal Navy, is based on Ludo.

=== Snakes and ladders ===
Snakes and ladders is a board game in Bangladesh. It is usually played on the Ludo board's opposite side, as Ludo and Snakes and ladders are made on the opposite side of the same board in Bangladesh.

Snakes and ladders originated as part of a family of Indian dice board games. They included gyan chauper and pachisi (which was adapted into Ludo, Parcheesi, and other cross and circle games). Gyan chaupar made its way to England and was sold as "Snakes and Ladders", then the basic concept was introduced in the United States as Chutes and Ladders.

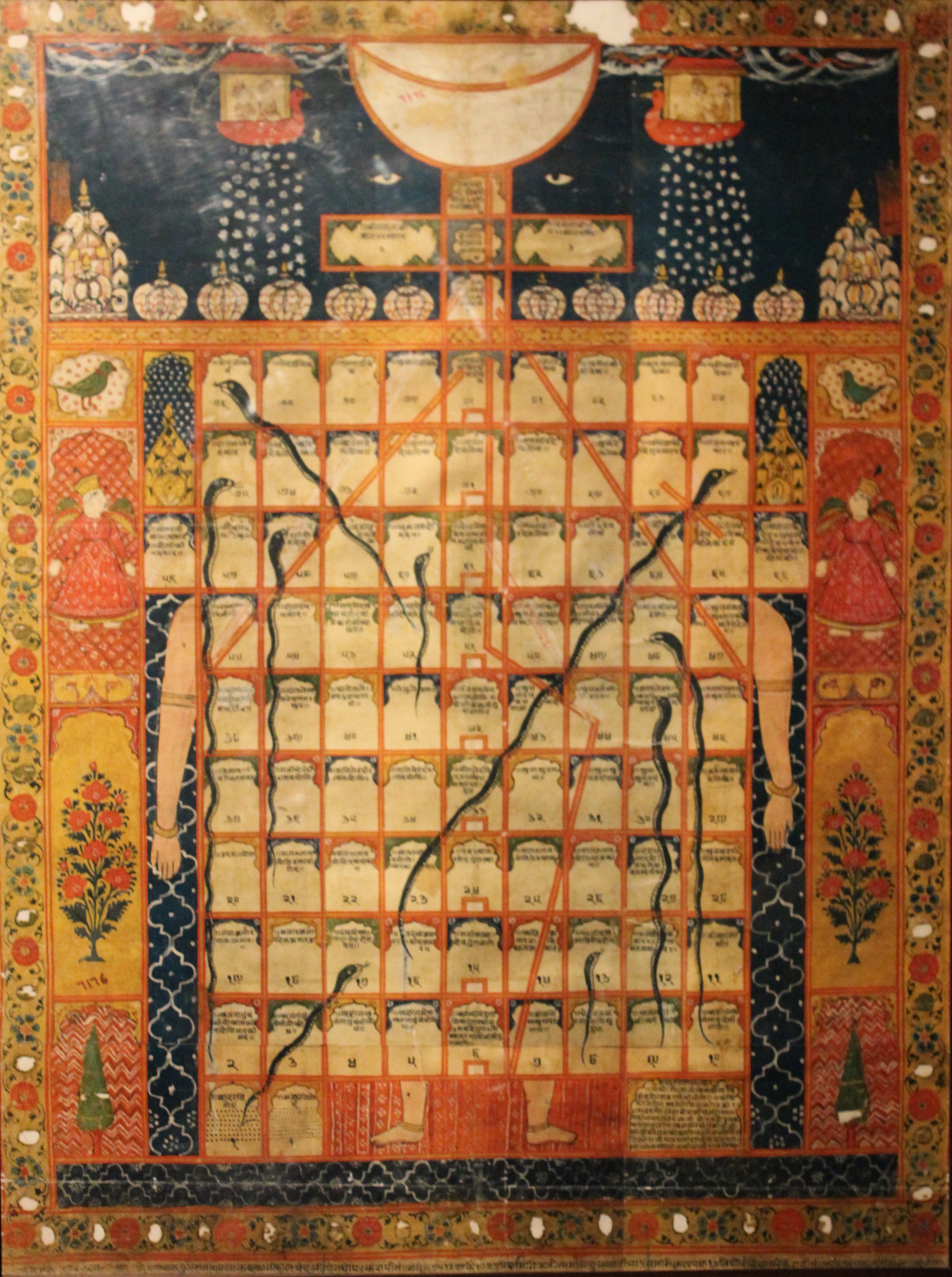
Gyan chaupar (Jain version of the game), National Museum, New Delhi

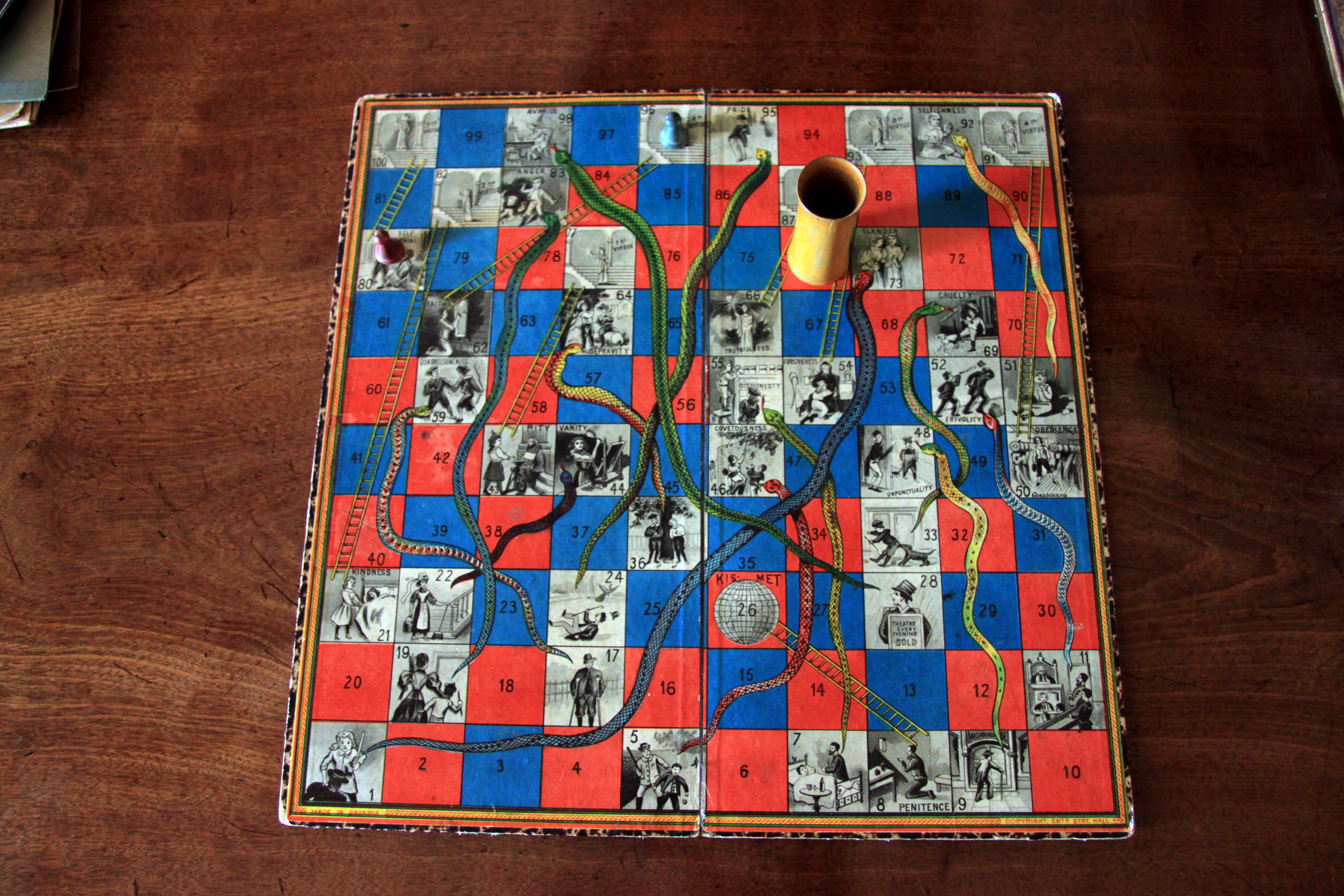
Snakes and Ladders from Victorian England, c. 1900, with ladders appearing in squares of good deeds, such as Thrift, Penitence, and Industry, and snakes appearing in squares of bad deeds, such as Dishonesty, Cruelty, and Indolence

=== Carrom ===
Carrom is a board game in Bangladesh. It is played by mostly teenagers. Many tea stalls have Carrom to attract customers. The Bangladeshi variant of Carrom is slightly different from the professional variant.

The game of carrom originated in India. One carrom board with its surface made of glass is still present in one of the palaces in Patiala, India. State-level competitions were being held in the different states of India during the early part of the 20th century. Serious carrom tournaments may have begun in Sri Lanka in 1935; by 1958, both India and Sri Lanka had formed official federations of carrom clubs, sponsoring tournaments and awarding prizes.

== Strategy Gemes ==
=== • Bagh Chagol ===
2 players — one plays the tiger, the other controls multiple goats (usually 5 or more).

=== • 16(Shulo) Guti ===
Strategy game that is played on a board or flat surface, similar to chess or checkers.

== Others ==
Other popular rural games include:

- Guli (Bengali: গুলি)
- Luko-churi (Bengali: লুকো-চুরি) - equ Played on a board drawn in the dirt or with chalk (usually a grid or triangle-based pattern).ivalent to hide-and-seek.
- Lattu (Bengali: লাট্টু)
- Gutidara (Bengali: গুটিদাড়া)

== See also ==
- Traditional games of India
- Traditional games of Pakistan
- Traditional South Asian games

== Sources ==
- Hogan, Patrick Colm; Pandit, Lalita (2003). Rabindranath Tagore: Universality and Tradition. Fairleigh Dickinson University Press. ISBN 9780838639801.
- Mukhopadhyay, Suvendushekhar (2000). Hindu Melar Itibritta (in Bengali). Gautam Sengupta. ISBN 9789383014224.
- Raha, Bipasha; Chattopadhyay, Subhayu (2017-12-22). Mapping the Path to Maturity: A Connected History of Bengal and the North-East. Routledge. doi:10.4324/9781351034142. ISBN 9781351034128.
