= Lisi (boat) =

Type of boat from the Solomon Islands

Lisi is a type of plank boat from the Solomon Islands. It is crescent-shaped and is similar in appearance to the tomako war canoes, but differs in that the topmost strakes of the lisi have a gap in the middle. Lisi are also usually proportionally broader and less ornamented than the tomako. They are used for fishing and transport rather than for raiding. Lisi can vary in size from small canoes to large ships used for trade. The largest types of lisi are known as solima, which can carry 50 people and is used for long sea voyages. There are two general types of lisi, the ordinary trading lisi is known as the "lisi nume." An ornate lisi with inlaid shell decorations used for transporting village chiefs in diplomatic missions is known as the "la'o." Voyages of lisi to other islands usually required a ritual human sacrifice on the return trip known as siki po'upo'u ("removing the cross sticks").

== Gallery ==
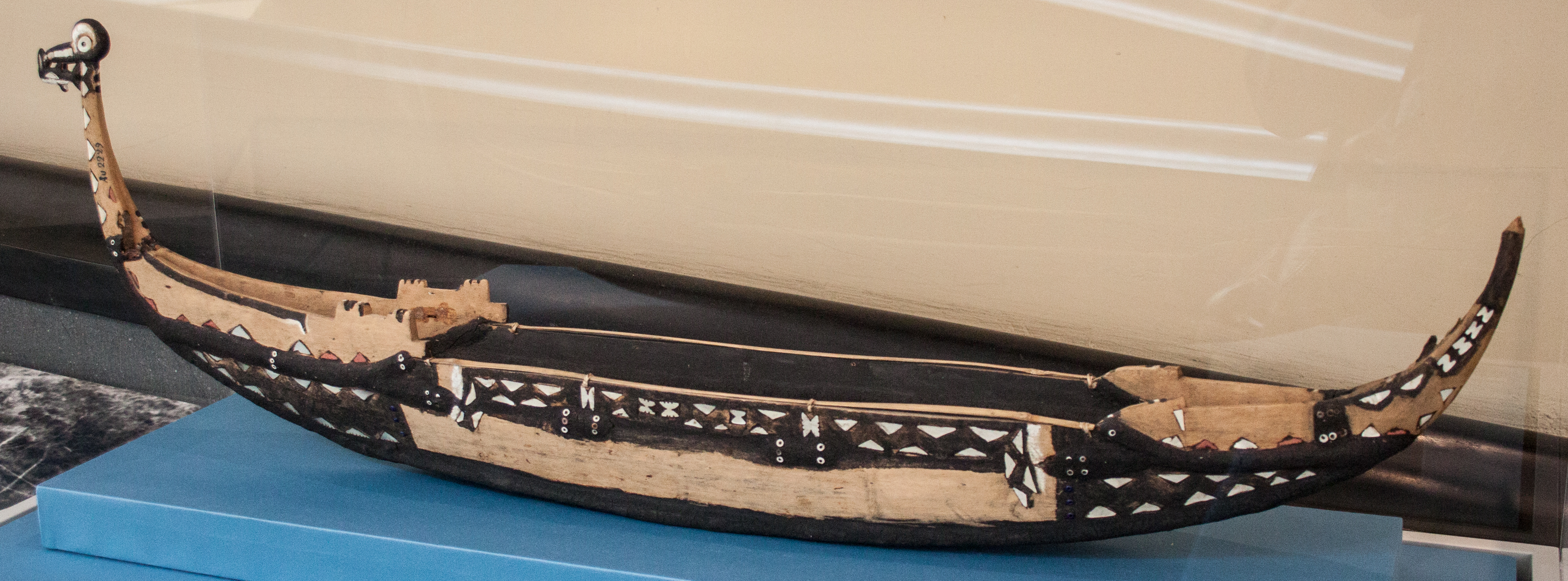
Model of a lisi with a bird-shaped prow in the Vatican Museum

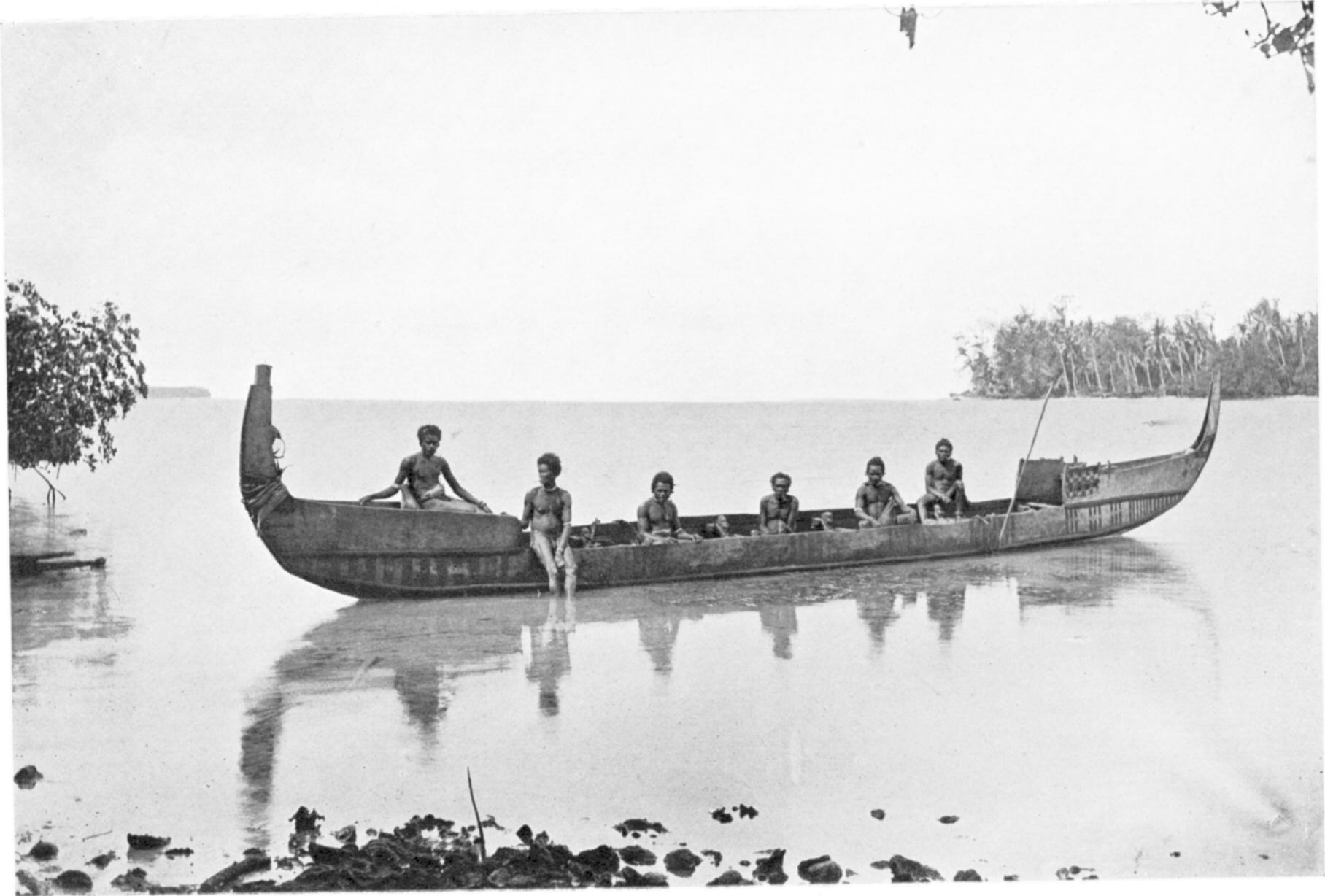
A lisi from Marau Sound (c. 1908)

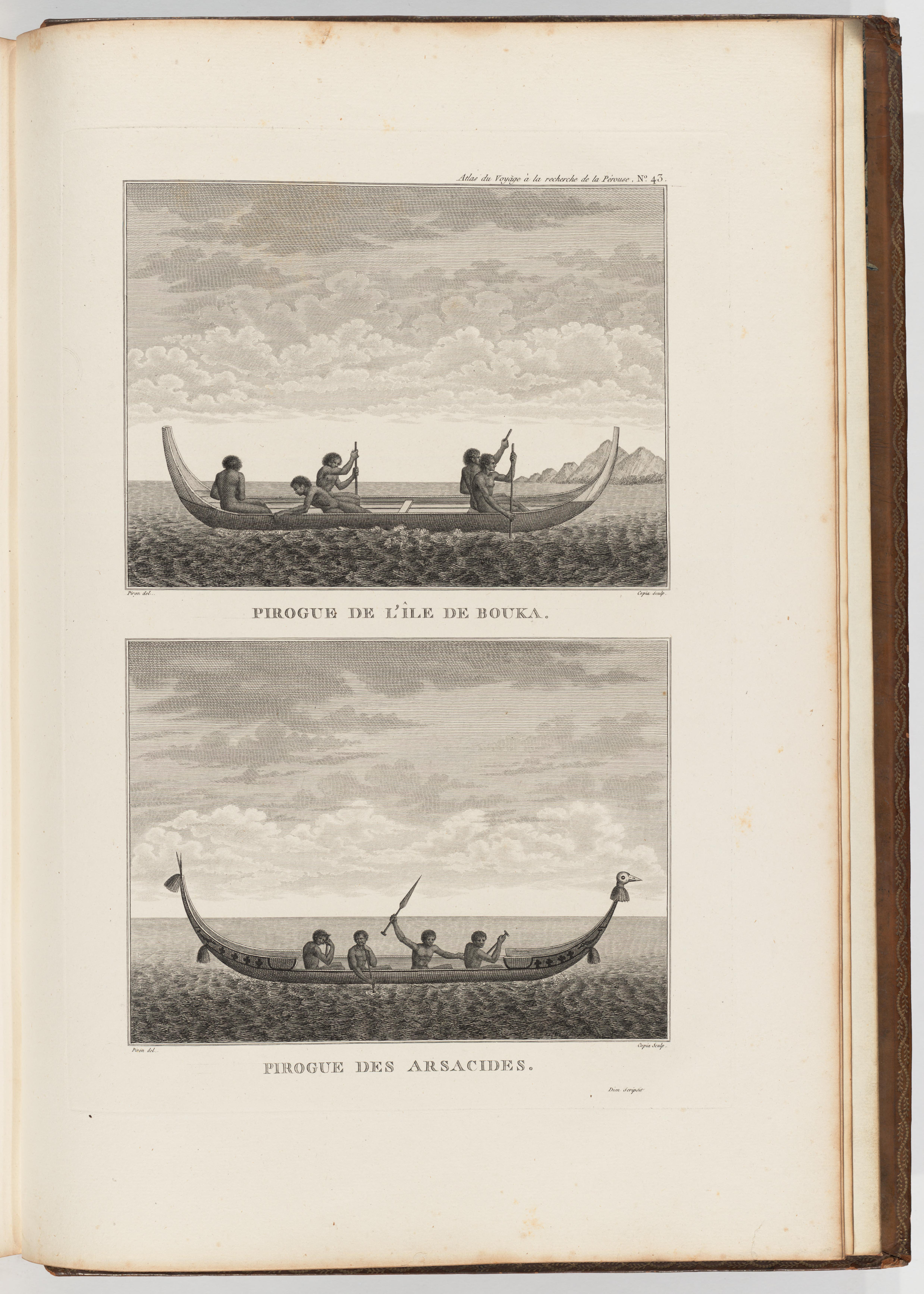
Illustrations of lisi from Voyage de La Pérouse autour du monde (1792)

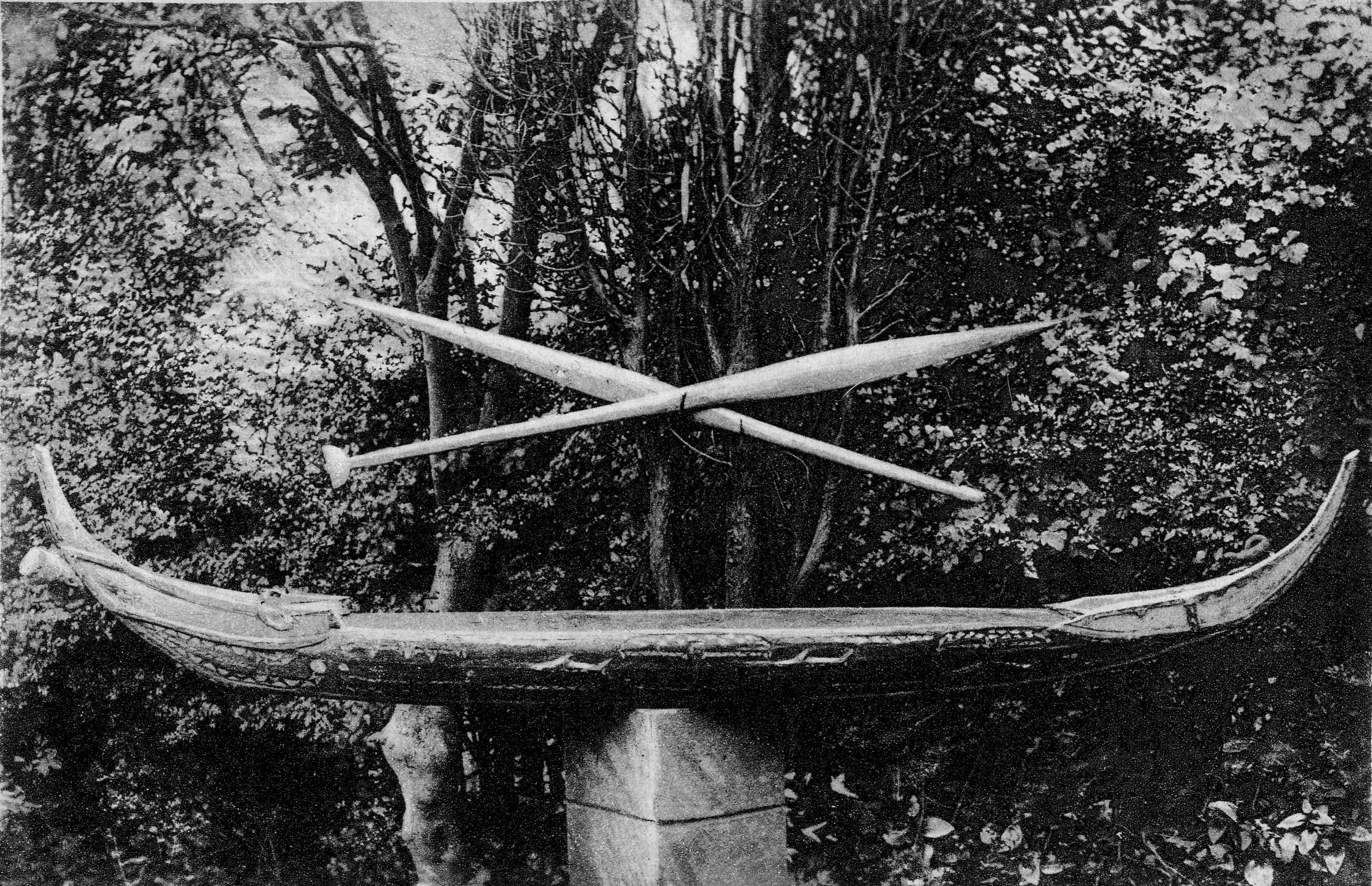
Model of a lisi from Makira (c. 1887)

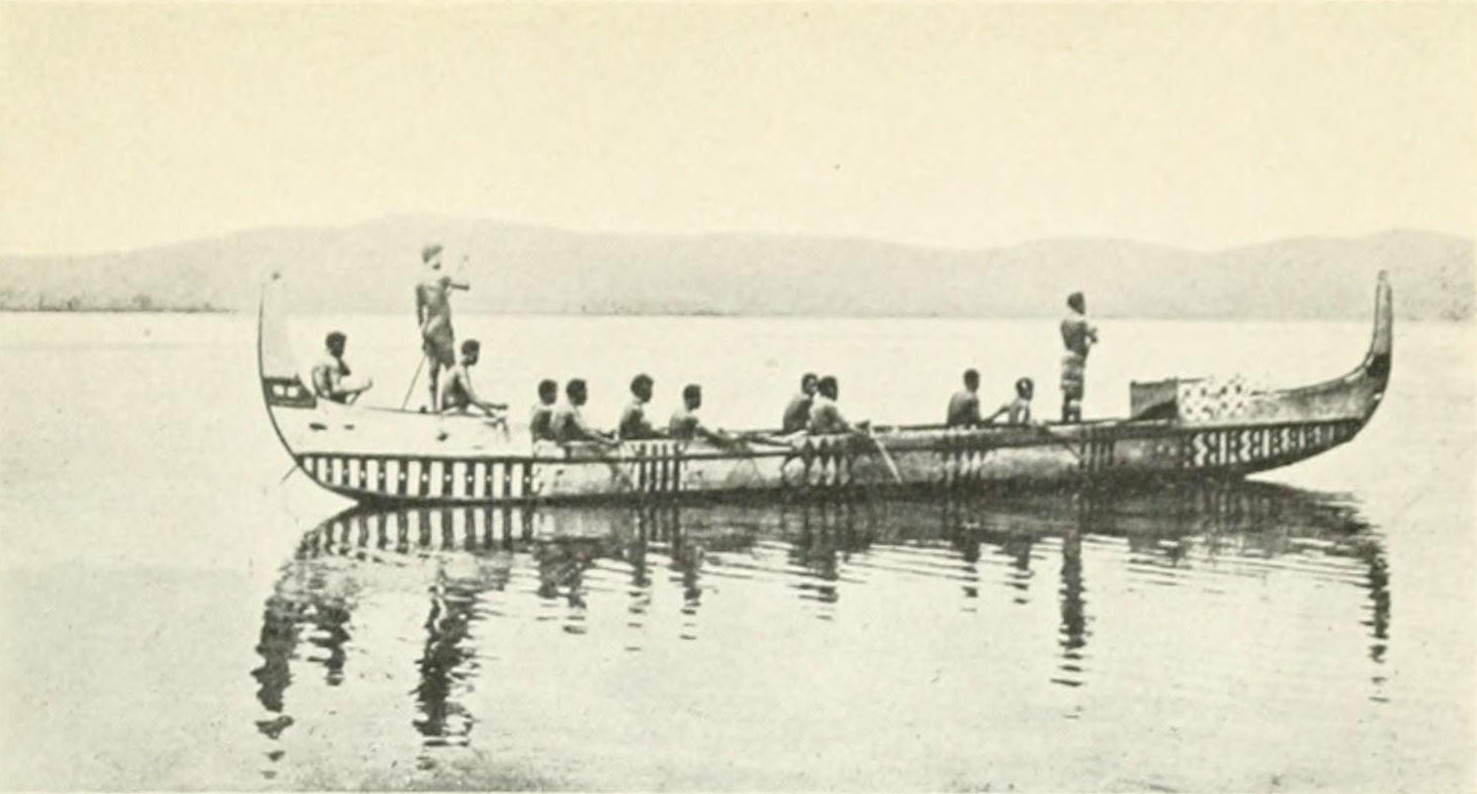
A lisi with painted designs from Malaita (c. 1909)

== See also ==
- Tomako
- Binabina
- Waka taua
- Salisipan
- Kelulus
