= Binabina =

Plank boat from the Solomon Islands

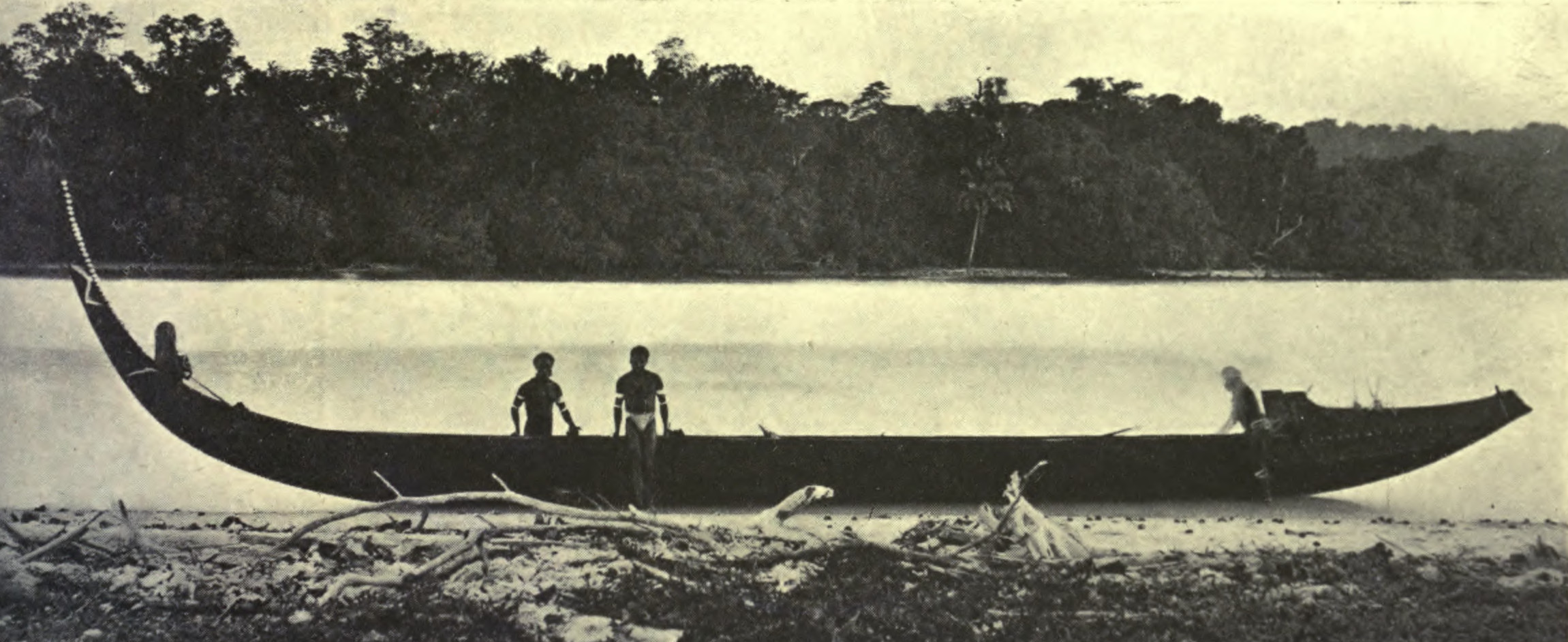
A binabina from Santa Isabel Island (c. 1909)

Binabina or biabina is a type of plank boat from the Solomon Islands. It differs from the similar tomako and lisi in that only the stern is upturned, while the bow is horizontal.

== See also ==
- Tomako
- Lisi (boat)
- Waka taua
- Salisipan
- Kelulus
