= Swan boat (racing) =

Type of sports boat

A swan boat is a very long and narrow human-powered boat used in the team paddling sport of swan boat racing. It is similar to dragon boat and is mainly practiced in Thailand. Swan boats are round-bottomed boats. They come in several lengths that hold 20, 40, and 60 paddlers in a side-by-side configuration.

== See also ==
- Dragon boat
- Nouka Baich
- Waka (canoe)
- War canoe
- Chundan vallam
