= Orembai =

Type of boat from the Maluku Islands of Indonesia

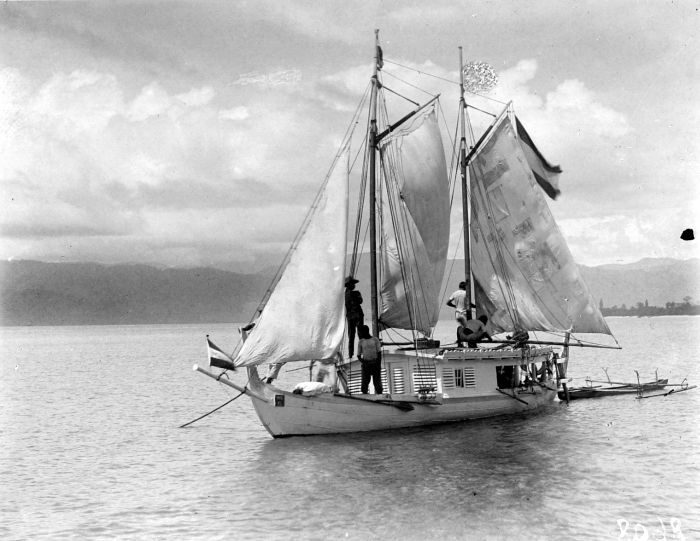
An orembai with a gaff-ketch rig in Elpaputih Bay, Seram Island. October 1940.

Orembai or Arombai is a type of plank boat from the Maluku Islands of Eastern Indonesia. It is mainly used for fishing and transport. This vessel is used as far as Batavia, where in the 17th century it became popular to go out "orembaaien" on an evening rowing on the river or city canals.

== Etymology ==
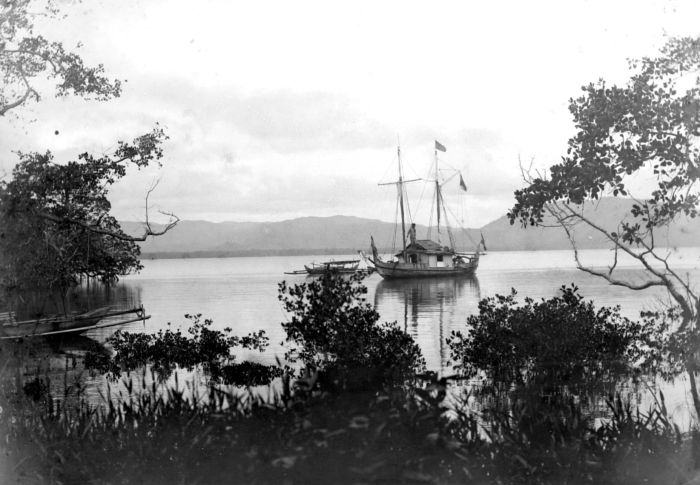
At the bend of Piroe, Seram, 1892.

The name orembai or arumbai probably comes from the adapted Malay word rembaya, which means state ship, with Portuguese prefix 'o'. In other variants of language they are also called orembaai, arambaai, arobail, arubai, arubaillo, arumbai, arumbae, oranbai, oranbaik, orang-bays, and corambay. Martin says that the name orembai is a contraction for orang baik ("good man") and comes from the era of the Hongi voyages, i.e. these boats are the opposite of Hongitocht kora kora, which is a war vessel.

== Description ==
It is characterized by being equal-ended, with the prow and the stern both rising up abruptly into a sharp point about 1.26 m (4.1 ft) from the ground, giving it a crescent shape. It is widest at the middle, tapering gradually towards both ends. It usually has three strakes attached to a narrow keel which in turn is joined to a stem-post at each end. The stempost is broader and lower than the sternpost. Traditional orembai uses the tanja or lete sail, but more modern orembai adopted European-style rigging, such as pinisi rig and schooner rig. Orembai is built using planks, joined with lashed-lug construction.

The orembai is very similar to the mon of the North Solomons. It also resembles the kora kora, but differs in that, like most large Austronesian ships, the orembai does not have outriggers (likely due to their inherent stability).

== Gallery ==
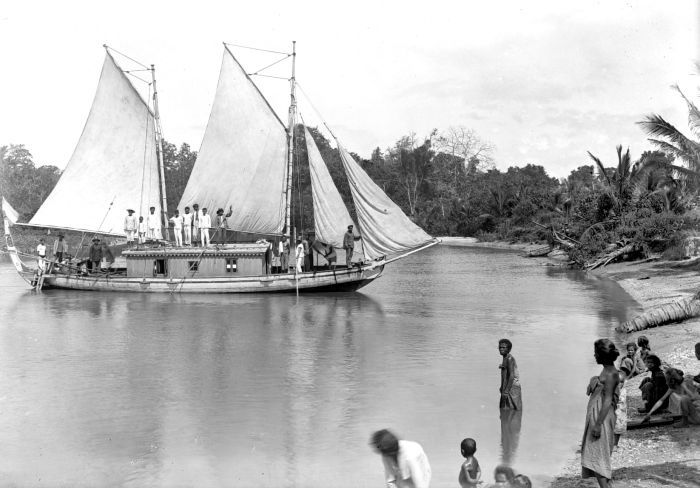
A "modern" orembai, West Seram, Moluccas. Before 1923.

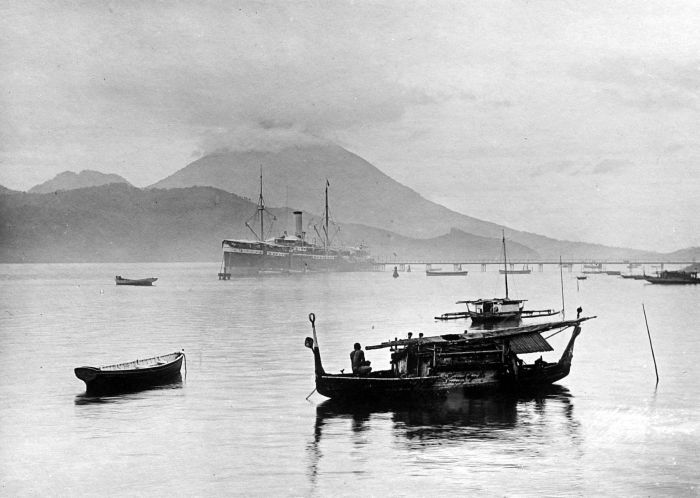
A traditional orembai with lowered sail (either a tanja or lete/crab claw sail), Ternate. Between 1910 and 1930

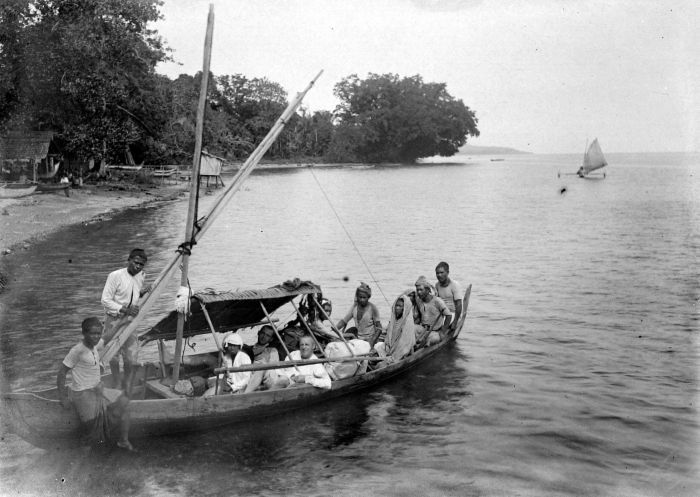
A small orembai with a crab claw sail in Rumahkay, Seram Island

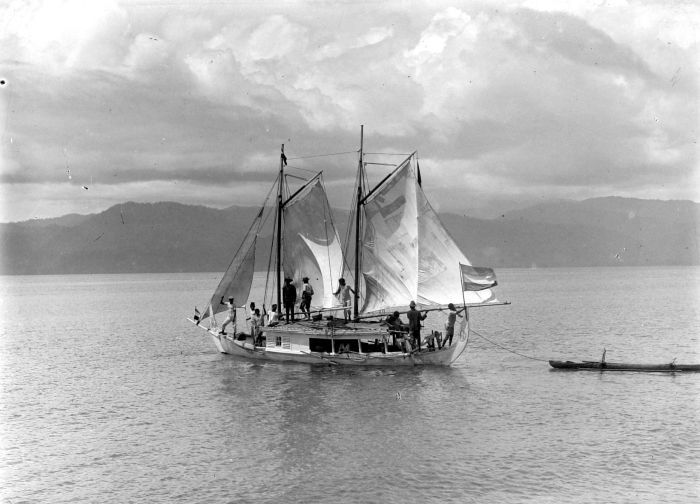
Dutch-owned orembai, Seram, Moluccas, ca. 1925

== See also ==
- Lambo (boat)
- Padewakang
- Pencalang
- Karakoa
- Knabat bogolu
