= Nuntaa (game) =

Bangladeshi game

Nuntaa (Bengali: নুনতা, also known as Bengali: কুতকুতে, romanized: Kutkute in South Bengal) is a Bangladeshi game that is played by children and teenagers in rural areas.In nuntaa, a child stands in a circle, and has to chase the others. It is usually played in groups.

== System ==
In nuntaa, a circular area called the "house" is drawn on the ground. One person is then selected as the "nuntaa", and stands outside the house, while the others stay inside the house. The player outside starts reciting "Nuntaa Bolooree"; those inside reply "ek holooree". After saying "nuntaa" up to seven times, the others run away, and the nuntaa occupies the house.

After that, the nuntaa holds his breath and, while reciting an agreed-upon phrase, the "nuntaa" chases the others. The first person tagged becomes a member of nuntaa and tries to get the others; the nuntaa group thus quickly becomes crowded. The person who is caught last becomes the owner of the house for the next game. If the nuntaa breathes while running, the others may catch him and beat him on the back until he or they reach the house.
