= Tomako =

Solomon Islander war canoe

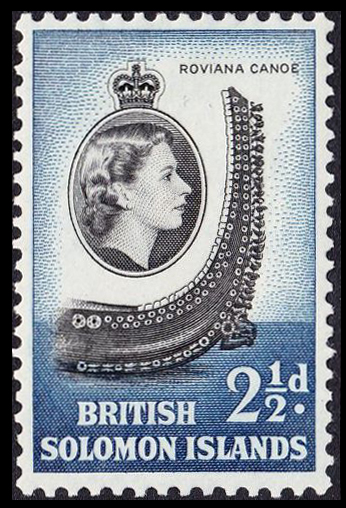
1960 stamp from the British Solomon Islands showing the prow of a tomako

Tomako or tomoko is a large war canoe from the Solomon Islands. The name "tomako" is used in New Georgia in the Roviana language. It is also known as magoru in Marovo, niabara in Vella Lavella, mon in Bougainville, ora in Makira, and iola or ola in Malaita and Ulawa. Tomako were narrow and usually between 12 and 18 m (39 and 59 ft) in length. They did not possess outriggers or sails and were propelled solely by paddling. They were built by fitting planks edge-to-edge which are then "sewn" together and caulked with a paste made from the nut of the tree Parinarium laurinum. They could carry 30 to 50 warriors, and were used in raiding expeditions for slaves or for headhunting. They were characteristically crescent-shaped, with sharply upturned prows and sterns (reaching up to 12 ft (3.7 m) high) that were decorated with fringes of cowrie shells, nautilus shells, and mother-of-pearl, as well as intricate carvings (Roviana: nguzunguzu; Marovo: toto isu). These carvings are usually of spirit animals or warriors like the kesoko (a bird or sea spirit) and Tiolo (a warrior deity). The body is commonly blackened to contrast with the decorations.

Tomako usually took 2 to 3 years to build using traditional stone and shell adzes. They were kept in sacred houses known as paele, which also housed human heads taken during battle. Tomako is similar to the lisi, another common boat type in the Solomon Islands which also lacks outriggers, but differs in that the topmost strakes of the lisi have a gap in the middle. It also resembles the orembai of the Maluku Islands, except the latter usually has a sail.

The last canoes used for war were confiscated by the British colonial government in the Solomon Islands during the early 1900s to stop headhunting raids. It was eventually bought by a private German collector. However, new canoes were built at around 1910–1912. They were used for canoe-racing, encouraged by the colonial government to preserve the traditional boatbuilding practices. In the 11th Festival of Pacific Arts in 2012 hosted by the Solomon Islands, several Tomako were built and displayed.

== Gallery ==
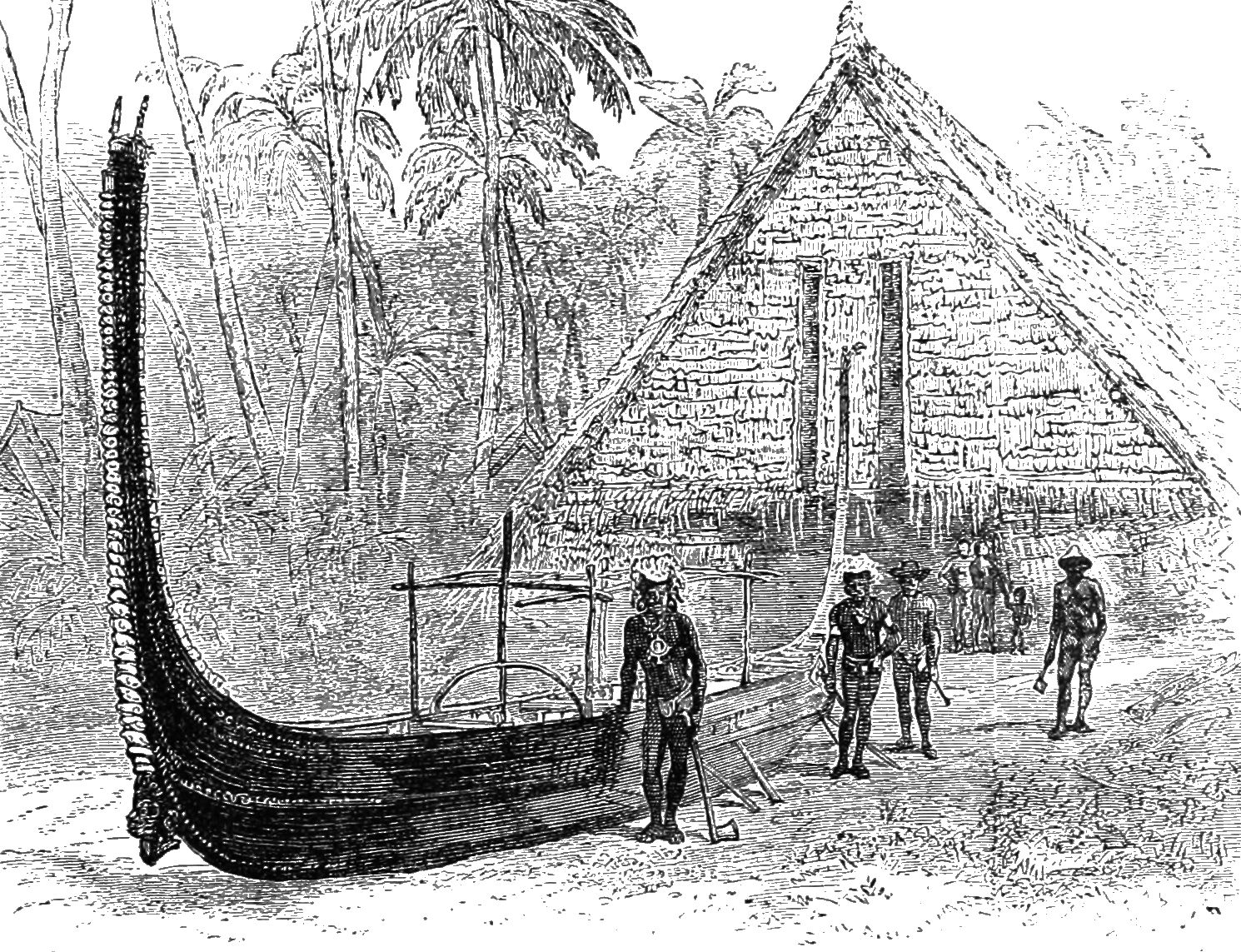
Woodcut illustration of a tomako stored in a paele (c. 1889)

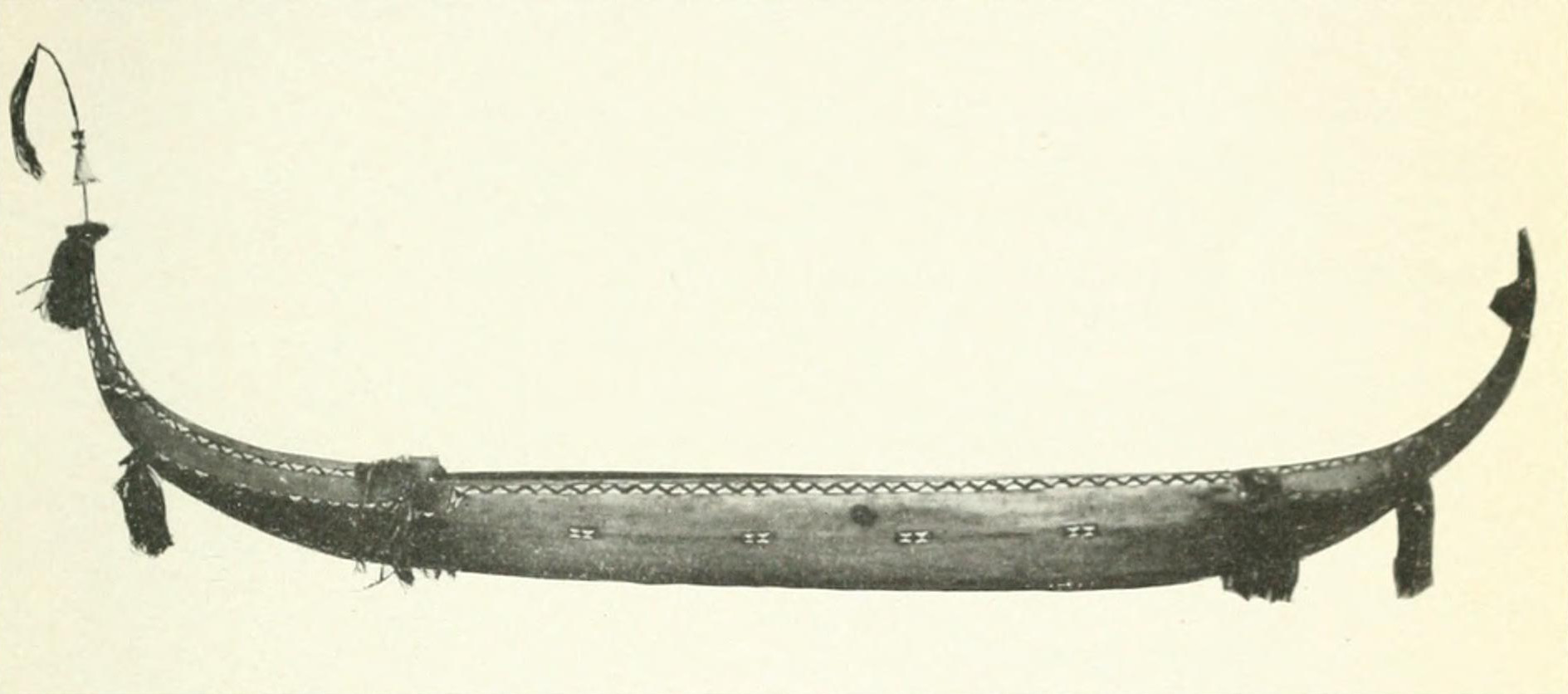
An ornamented tomako (c. 1918)

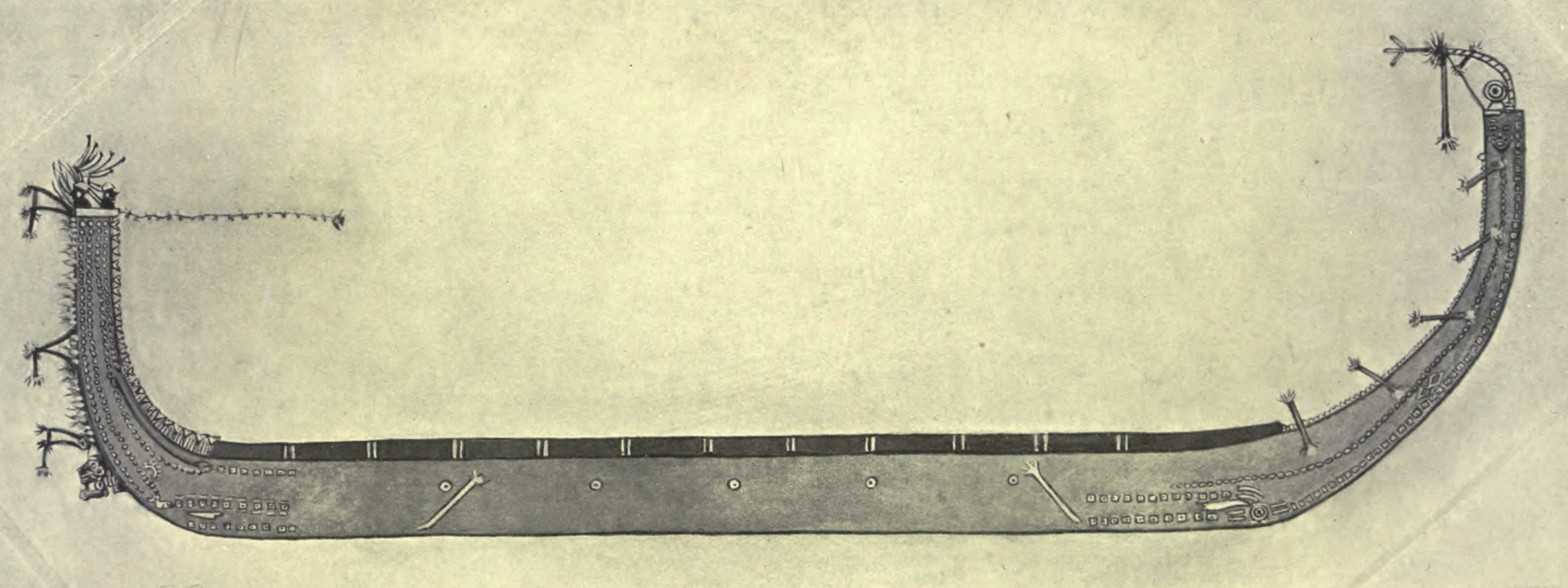
A tomako from Santa Isabel Island (c. 1909)

== See also ==
- Binabina
- Lisi (boat)
- Waka taua
- Salisipan
- Kelulus
- Ipanitika
