= Gutidara =

Bangladeshi traditional game

Characteristics
- Contact: No
- Team members: 11 players per side
- Mixed-sex: No
- Type: Team sport

Presence
- Country or region: Brahmanbaria District

Gutidara (Bengali: গুটিদাড়া) is a traditional rural game in Bangladesh, played in the early morning after the pre-winter harvest in the fields of most villages in Brahmanbaria District.

The two main tools of the game are a ball, locally known as a guti and made from water buffalo horns, and a one-and-a-half-cubit-long stick made of bamboo. Pieces made from buffalo horns are currently scarce, and so the game is often played with machine-made artificial pieces. Gutidara is played by two teams with eleven players each. The boundaries are determined by the players. For thirty minutes, each team tries to hit the guti out of bounds with a bamboo stick, while the players of the opposite team try to catch the guti. Every catch deducts from the opponent's points. If the opposing team fails to stop the guti before it crosses the boundaries of the playing area, the hitting team earns points. The team with the most points at the end of the game is declared the winner. Two referees officiate the game. A coin toss determines which team is to start hitting guti first.

Though the game is not played in every part of Bangladesh, it is considered a national tradition. Under the initiative of the local literary academy in Brahmanbaria, there is a tradition of organizing gutidara matches among the young and old every year in Sherpur, within the municipal area of Brahmanbaria. In addition to the annual competition, players go to different places including Shahbazpur in Sarail Upazila to play.
