= Sari gan =

Form of folk song in Bengal

Sari or Shari gan is a traditional form of folk music in Bangladesh and West Bengal, India are usually sung by boatmen and other workers groups. It is common for Sari gan to be sung during Nouka Baich competitions.
