= Nouka Baich =

Dragon boat sport in Bangladesh

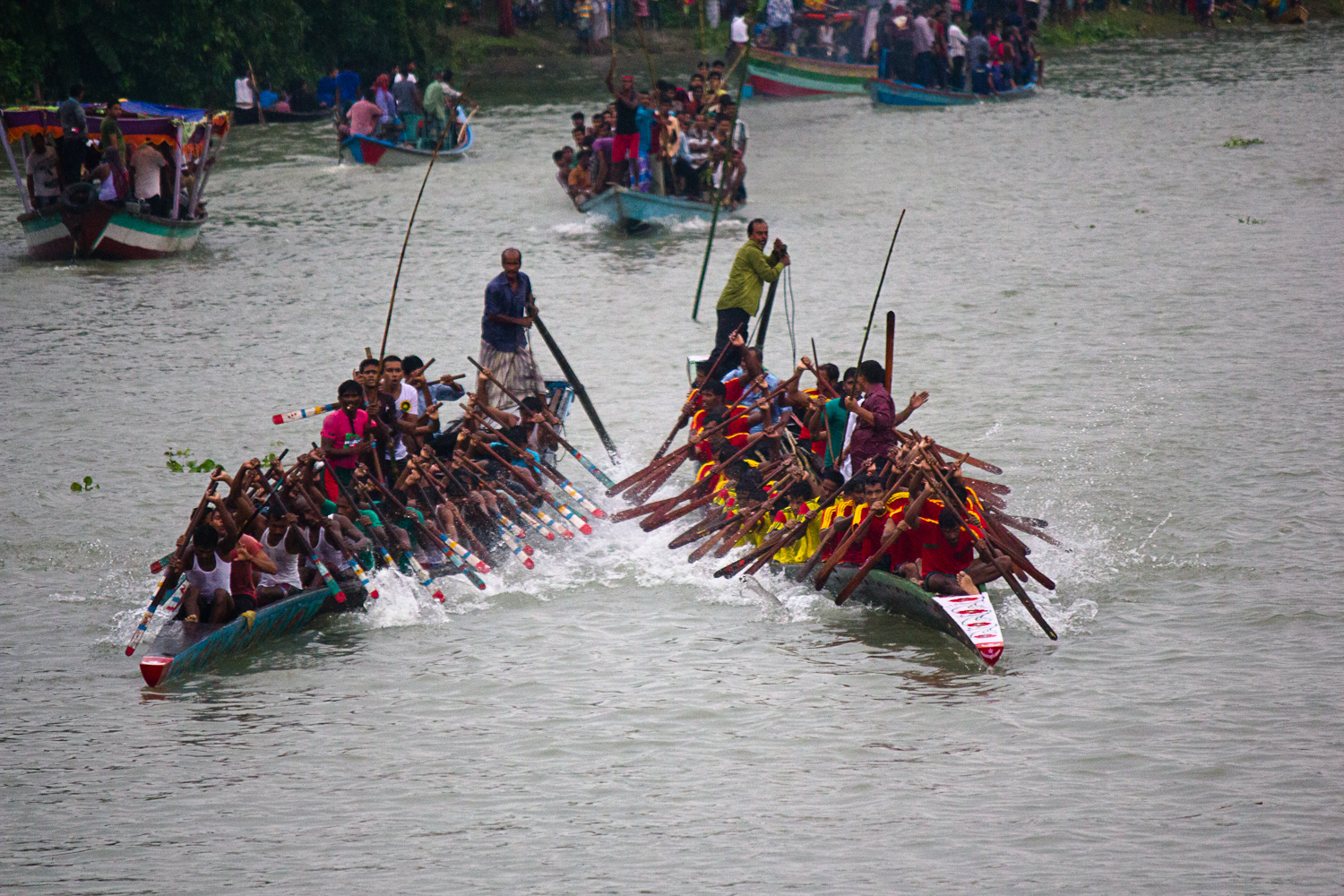
- Nicknames: Nowka Bais

Characteristics
- Type: Outdoor, aquatic
- Equipment: Boat, paddle
- Venue: Body of water

Presence
- Country or region: Bangladesh

Nouka Baich (Bengali: নৌকা বাইচ, lit. Boat Race, also spelt Nowka Bais) is a traditional dragon boat-style paddling sport of Bangladesh. The Bangladesh Rowing Federation, established in 1974, is the authority of all rowing activities in Bangladesh and has organised over 40 National Rowing Championships. The races are held during the wet and autumn seasons of the Bengali calendar which corresponds from June to October in the Gregorian calendar. The "Nowka Bais" which takes place annually in Birmingham is a cultural event in the West Midlands, United Kingdom attracting not only the Bangladeshi diaspora but a variety of cultures. It is also the largest kind of boat race in the United Kingdom.

== Common elements ==
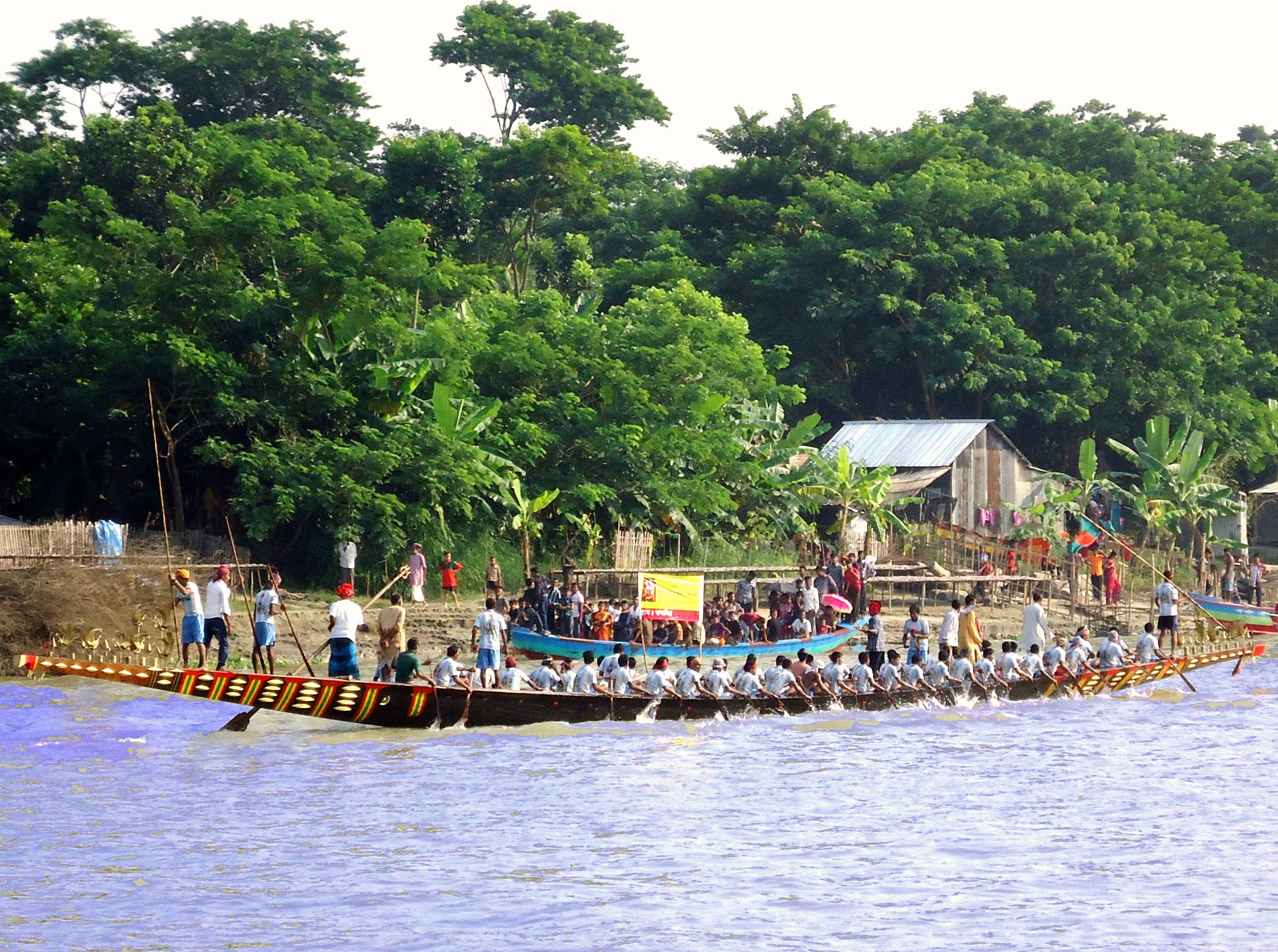
A Nouka Baich being performed near a rural village in Madhumati River.

Boats used for Nouka Baich are long with each team can consist from 7 to up to 100 members known as majhis. Boats with motor engines are not allowed. Boats are usually named with attractive and boastful names displaying quality and speed. During inter-riverine competitions, teams are named after their respective 'home rivers'. It is also a social event, and it is common for the competitors to sing Sari gan folk songs as they compete during the race. A popular song is Ronger Nao Ronger Boitha, Ronge Ronge Bao (Cheerfully tune the colourful oars of the colourful boat).

== History ==
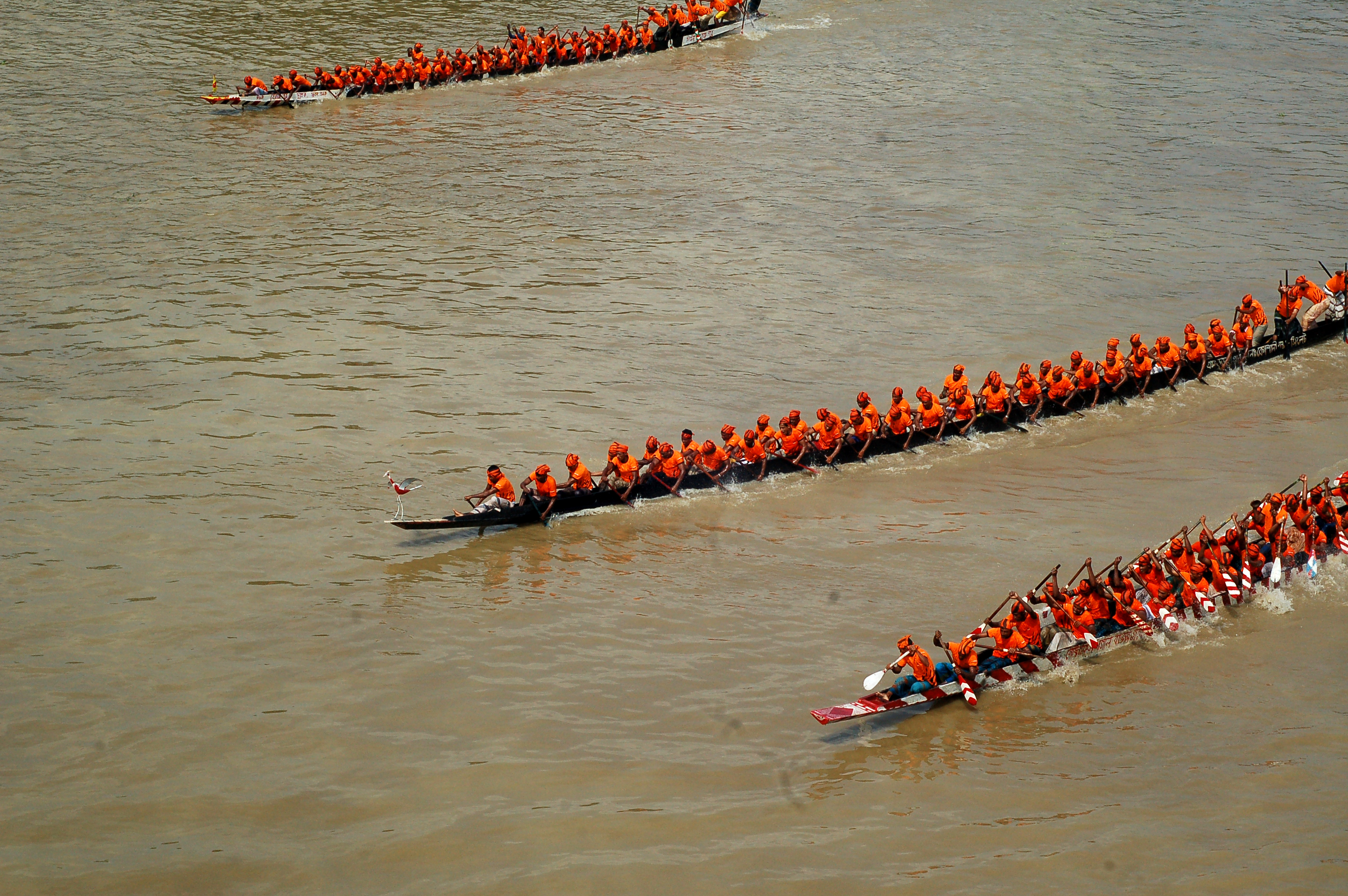
A large Nouka Baich competition taking place with over hundreds of participants.

With riverine Bangladesh's geography being dominated by the world's largest delta, the country has over 230 rivers in its terrain. The rivers have played an important role in the livelihoods of the native Bengali people.

Common in rural areas, Nouka Baich is a very old tradition of the folk Bengali culture going back centuries. Its popularity in urban areas increased in the 18th century. The various Nawab families throughout Mughal Bengal were also known for organising races and the use of Sari gan started to become more popular.

Nouka Baich was also common during the British rule in the Sylhet region after the rainy season when much of the land goes under water. The long canoes were referred to as khel naos (meaning playing boats) and the use of cymbals to accompany the singing was common.

== Boat variation ==
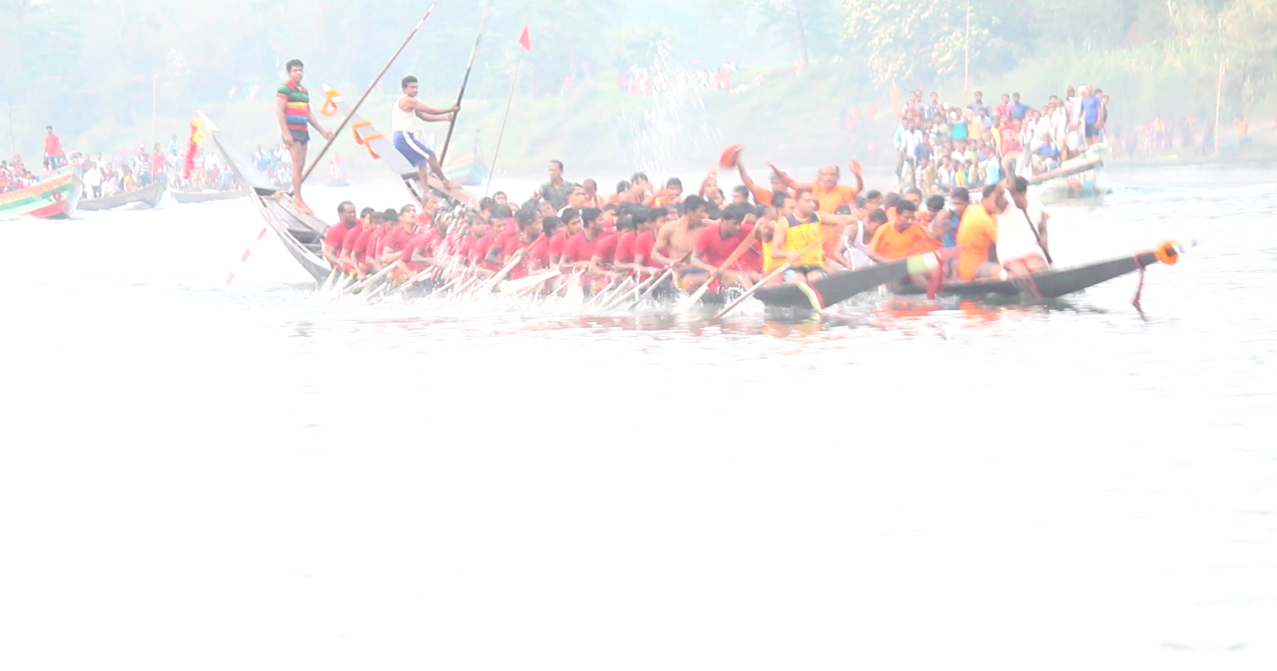
Nouka Baich taking place in Kaliganga River, South Bengal.

Different types of boats may be used in different parts of Bangladesh. Straight-back narrow timber boats known as koshas are used in Mymensingh, Pabna and Dhaka. The latter also uses goyna boats in its races. The use of sarangi boats is a tradition of Sylhet, Comilla and Brahmanbaria. Racing with Sampans is common in Chittagong, Cox's Bazar, Feni and Noakhali.

== Outside Bangladesh ==
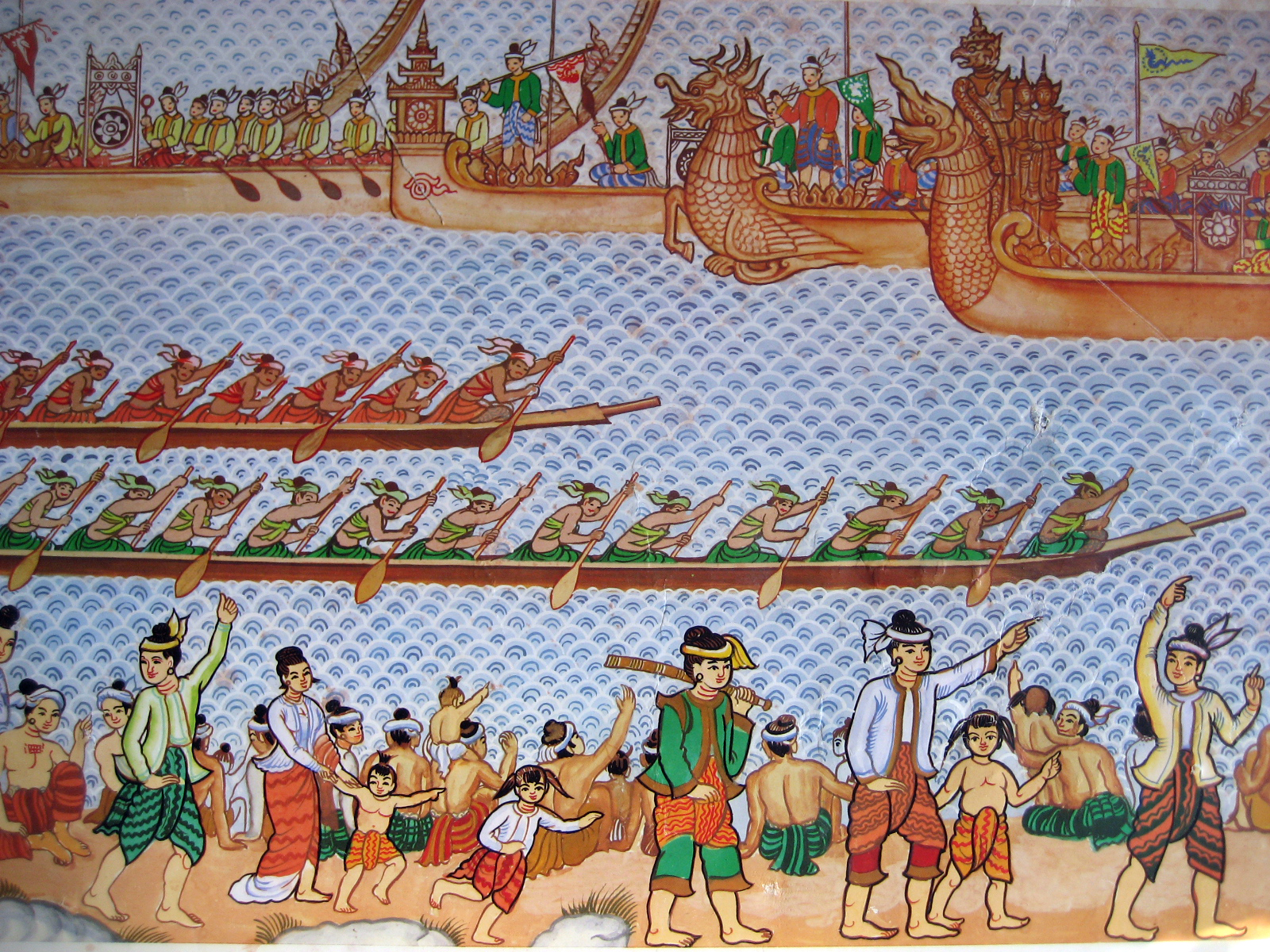
A traditional Burmese regatta

The Rakhine Buddhists of Myanmar and some parts of Bangladesh also have a similar tradition called Pailong Poye.

In 2007, the British Bangladeshi community in Oxford initiated the first 'Nowka Bais' event in the United Kingdom as part of Oxfordshire County's 1000th birthday by getting two 40 ft canoes made in Sylhet, Bangladesh and bringing them to England. Nowka Bais in England has now become an annual cultural event attracting thousands such as the likes of the High Commissioner of Bangladesh.

In 2012, the event was dedicated to the Diamond Jubilee of Elizabeth II. Queen Elizabeth II issued a statement on the event and expressed her interest about the Bengali tradition to the founder of Nowka Bais UK and Oxford Bangladeshi Boat Club, Azizur Rahman.

In 2015, the event founder selected Birmingham to be its host city, which hosts a larger Bangladeshi diaspora population than Oxford. It has also become a mela (festival) with performances, stall and funfair rides. In 2018, The Nowka Bais short film documentary was released based on the events in Birmingham.

== See also ==
- Dragon boat
- War canoe
- Waka (canoe)
- Swan boat (racing)
- Chundan vallam
- Lutka
