= Dariyabandha =

Bangladeshi traditional game

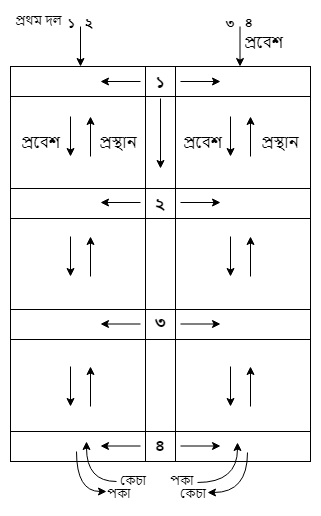
Standard court layout for Dariyabanda game

Dariyabanda (Bengali: দাড়িয়াবান্ধা) is a well-known traditional rural sport of Bangladesh. The game is played throughout the country with variations according to local customs and rules. The National Recreation Association of Bangladesh has formulated an accepted set of rules for the game. Children across almost all regions enjoy playing Dariyabanda, and it is also popular among both boys and girls, as well as adults.

== Court ==
The playing field measures 50 feet in length and 20 feet in width. A parallel line runs through the center of the court, 50 feet long and 1 foot wide. The entire court is divided by four evenly spaced transverse lines, creating ten 10-inch squares across the length. Additionally, there are six transverse lines, each 1 foot wide.

== Rules ==
Each team consists of six players. A toss determines which team will attack and which will defend. The game is played in two halves of 25 minutes each, with a 5-minute break in between. If a player is tagged and eliminated, the opposing team is allowed to attack with half of their players. The match is overseen by one referee, 6 or 12 "Dariya judges," and two scorers. If the game ends in a draw, a tiebreaker of 10-1-10 minutes (10 minutes play, 1-minute break, another 10 minutes play) is held to determine the winner.

=== General gameplay ===
The game begins by marking the court on the ground, which resembles a badminton court in layout. Ideally, each team should have four to five players, though the game can be played with as few as two players per team. The court is traditionally marked on flat ground using a spade.

Within a square playing area, two parallel lines are drawn at equal distances from the front and back, with approximately one handspan of space between the lines. These sections are called "cross courts" (আড়া কোর্ট). Two cross courts placed side by side form a central court known as the "vertical court" (খাড়া কোর্ট). The number of courts increases with the number of players.

Each cross court is occupied by one defending player, who attempts to block opponents from moving through the courts. If a defender touches an opposing player within the court boundaries, the tagged player is eliminated. However, the touch must be validated by the defender remaining in their designated area; if their foot is on the boundary line during the tag, it is considered invalid, and the opponent is not eliminated.

Players on the attacking team enter through the front of the court and attempt to move through all the courts to the back and return to the front again, all while avoiding being tagged by defenders. The defender in the front cross court may also utilize the full area of the vertical court behind them. If an attacking player successfully completes the circuit without being tagged, they score a point (called a "game").

If any defender steps on a boundary line, they must vacate their position, allowing the attacking team to occupy that court. The game can continue for extended periods in this manner.

There is no fixed standard for the dimensions of a Dariyabanda court; its size is typically determined by how much space a player can reasonably cover while running. However, the overall structure of the court remains consistent.

== See also ==
- Atya patya
- Kho Kho
