= Salisipan =

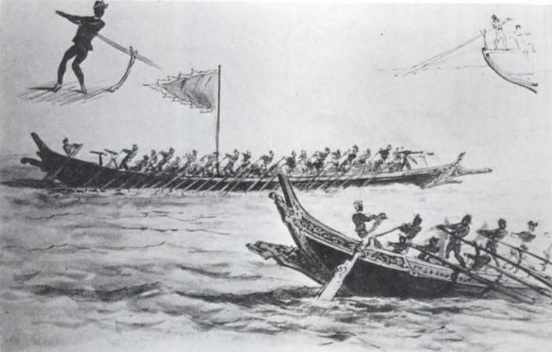
1890 illustration of Iranun salisipan by Rafael Monleón

Salisipan are long and narrow war canoes, with or without outriggers, of the Iranun and Banguingui people of the Philippines. They were mainly used for piracy and for raids on coastal areas. Salisipan resemble a long and narrow bangka that sit low on the water. They are propelled by rowers, steered by an oar at the stern, and are light enough to be hauled ashore. They are typically equipped with woven shields of nipa that could be propped along the sides to protect the rowers against arrows. They are sometimes also known by the more general terms vinta, baroto, or kakap. Salisipan are auxiliary vessels that accompany larger motherships like pangajava, garay, and lanong. Their presence was usually indicative of a larger raiding fleet nearby.

== See also ==
- Vinta
- Garay
- Penjajap
- Kelulus
- Karakoa
- Tomako
- Waka (canoe)
