= Kanamachi =

Kanamachi (Bengali: কানামাছি, romanized: Kanamachhi, lit. 'Blind Fly', also spelt Kanamasi or Khanamasi) is a traditional game popular in Bangladesh and in the Indian states of West Bengal, Assam, Odisha and Tripura. It is played mainly by children and is one of the most popular games among Bangladeshi and West Bengal villagers. Children living in towns and cities also love the game in great amount. It is similar to the European game Blind man's buff.

== Rules ==
Kanamachi is not restricted to certain rules, but there are common and widely used rules that most people maintain.

1. First the players choose one of them to be the Kanamachi. This is done by a toss or other methods.
2. The Kanamachi puts a cloth on their eyes and fastens it tightly, so that they cannot see things around.
3. Then the Kanamachi tries to catch other players.
4. Other players have to touch the Kanamachi and get to a safe place where the Kanamachi cannot catch them.
5. Once the Kanamachi manages to catch a fellow player, that player (who is caught) turns into the new Kanamachi. The former Kanamachi becomes a normal player.
