= List of people from Alappuzha =

This a list of notable people from the Indian city of Alappuzha, Kerala.

== Academia and science ==
- Itty Achudan - the major contributor of ethno-medical information for the compilation of Hortus Malabaricus
- Illiparambil Corah Chacko - geologist
- Pallithanam Luca Matthai - pioneer of kayal cultivation in Kuttanad, and former member of Sree Moolam Popular Assembly
- Sreedhara Panicker Somanath - Current Chairman of the Indian Space Research Organisation
- M. S. Swaminathan - Agronomist, Agricultural Scientist

== Arts and entertainment ==
=== Film and stage ===
- K. Madhu - film director, film producer, actor
- Saranya Ponvannan - actor
- Parvathy Jayaram - actor
- Mammootty - actor
- Navodaya Appachan (Chacko Punnoose) - film producer, director, and entrepreneur
- Ashokan - Malayalam film actor, 1978–
- Thoppil Bhasi - playwright, screenwriter, and film director
- Kunchako Boban - film actor
- Riaz M T - Film Actor
- Rajan P. Dev - Malayalam film actor
- Fazil - film director
- Fahad Fazil - film actor
- Chelangatt Gopalakrishnan - film critic and writer
- Kunchacko - film producer and director
- K. P. A. C. Lalitha - film actress
- Balachandra Menon - film actor, director, script writer
- Navya Nair - film actress in Malayalam, Tamil, and Kannada films
- Padmarajan - film director, script writer, story writer
- Chenganoor Raman Pillai - stage actor
- Muthukulam Raghavan Pillai - dramatist, film actor, poet
- Narendra Prasad - actor, playwright, and director
- Ratheesh - film actor
- M. G. Sreekumar - playback singer and film music director
- Sreekumaran Thampi - lyricist, director, producer, script writer
- Vayalar Sarath Chandra Varma - film lyricist
- Nedumudi Venu - film actor
- Vinayan - film director
- Saranya Mohan - film actor
- Aarsha Chandini Baiju - film actress
- Sibi Malayil - film director
- Renji Panicker - Actor, Scriptwriter, Film Director
- Mallika Sukumaran - Actress

=== Graphic arts ===
- K. Shankar Pillai - cartoonist (Shankar)

=== Literature ===
- Eleanour Sinclair Rohde - British gardener and writer on gardening
- Joy J. Kaimaparamban - English and Malayalam author
- Ayyappa Paniker - poet
- Kavalam Narayana Panicker - poet
- Parappurath (K. E. Mathai) - novelist and short story writer
- Thakazhi Sivasankara Pillai - novelist and short story writer
- Vayalar Ramavarma- Malayalam poet and film lyricist
- K. P. Sasidharan- Malayalam writer and academic
- Lopamudra R - Malayalam Poet and Translator

=== Music ===
- Mavelikkara Velukkutty Nair - mridangam player
- Palani Subramaniam Pillai - percussionist, played the mridangam and kanjira
- Erickavu N. Sunil - mridangam player
- Mavelikkara Prabhakara Varma - Carnatic singer
- V. Dakshinamoorthy - Music Composer, Carnatic Vocalist
- M. G. Radhakrishnan - Music Composer
- Pathiyoor Sankarankutty - Kathakali Musician

=== Kathakali and other art forms ===
- Mathoor Govindan Kutty - Kathakali Artist

== Commerce and business ==
- Bhima Bhattar - founder of Bhima Jewellers at Mullakkal, Alleppey

== Judiciary ==
- Justice CT Ravikumar, Judge Supreme Court of India

== Politics, government, and social welfare ==
- V. S. Achuthanandan - former Chief Minister and current leader of opposition of Kerala
- K. R. Gowri Amma - Revenue Minister in the first Kerala LDF ministry, initiated the revolutionary land reforms in Kerala, Agriculture Minister in Kerala UDF Ministry
- A. K. Antony - Three-time Chief Minister of Kerala, Former Indian Defence Minister
- Ramesh Chennithala - politician, former Member of Parliament
- T. K. Madhavan (1885–1930) social reformer, journalist and revolutionary
- Pallithanam Luca Matthai - Former member of Sree Moolam Popular Assembly and pioneer of kayal cultivation in Kuttanad
- Kavalam Madhava Panikkar - diplomat, administrator, historian
- P. Parameswaran - director of Bharathiya Vichara Kendram and president of Vivekananda Kendram
- Vayalar Ravi - former Home minister of Kerala, Union Cabinet Minister of Overseas Indian Affairs and Minister for Parliamentary Affairs
- C. M. Stephen - politician and Union minister

== Religion ==
- Baselios Thoma Didymos I - Catholicos of the East and Malankara Metropolitan
- Kuriakose Elias Chavara - Blessed, co-founder of CMI
- James Kalacherry - Bishop of Changanacherry, who campaigned against the move by C. P. Ramaswami Iyer, the Diwan of Travancore in 1945, to nationalise all schools
- Navajyothi Sree Karunakara, the founder of Santhigiri Ashram
- Mar Thomas Kurialachery - Venerable, first bishop of what would become the Archdiocese of Changanassery, and founder of the Sisters of the Adoration of the Blessed Sacrament
