= Alappuzha =

City in Kerala, India

Alappuzha Alleppey
- City
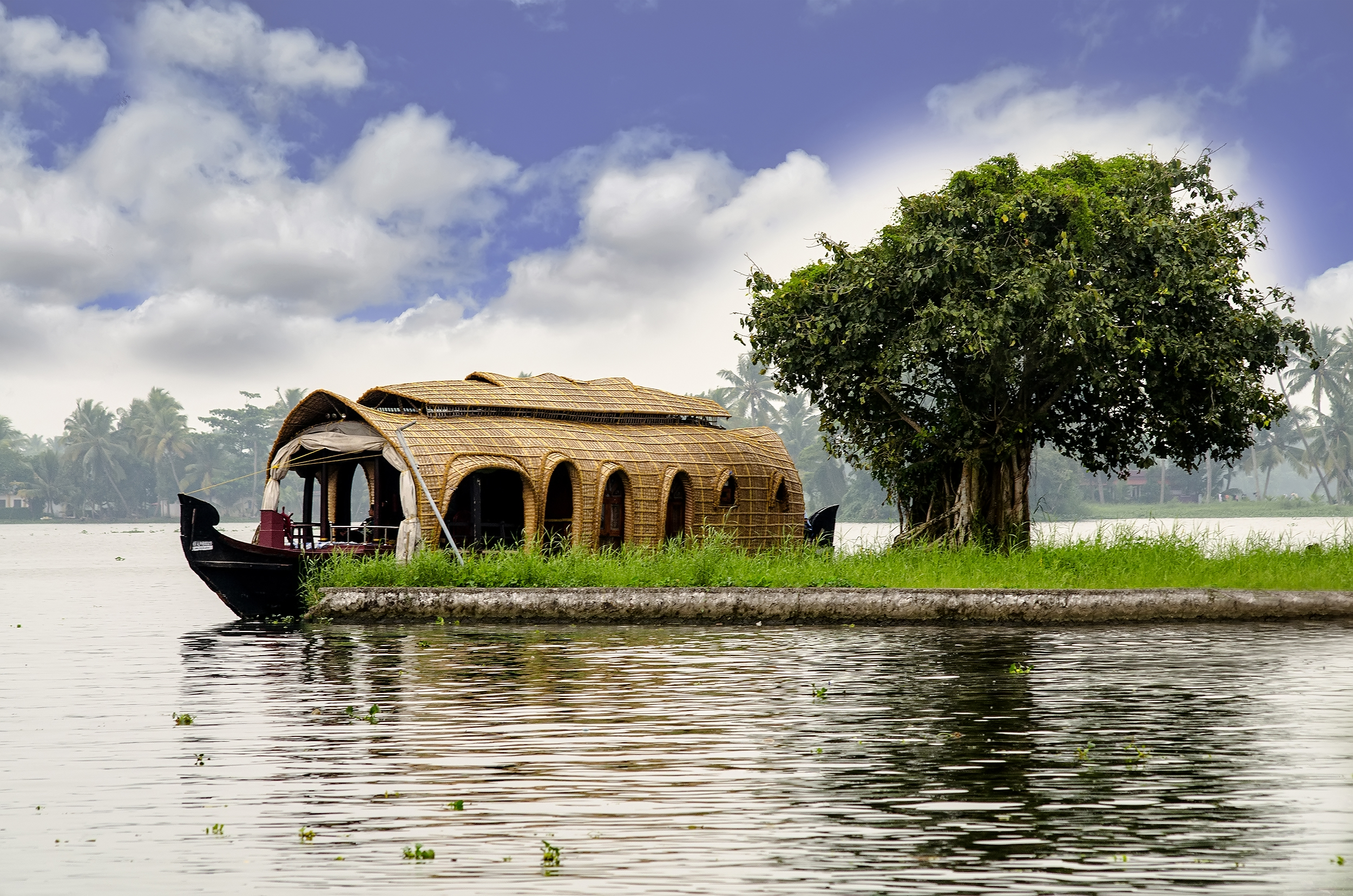
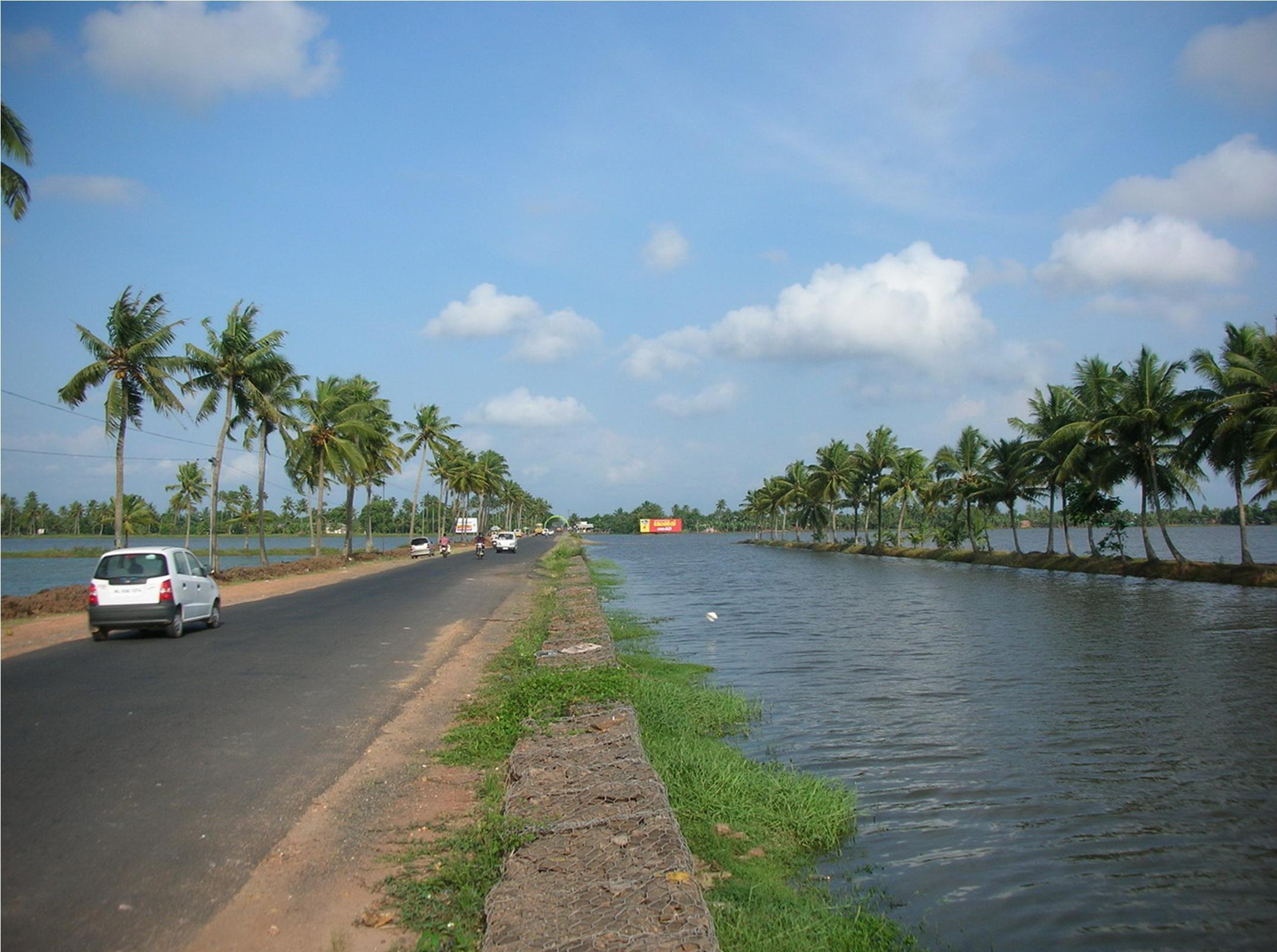
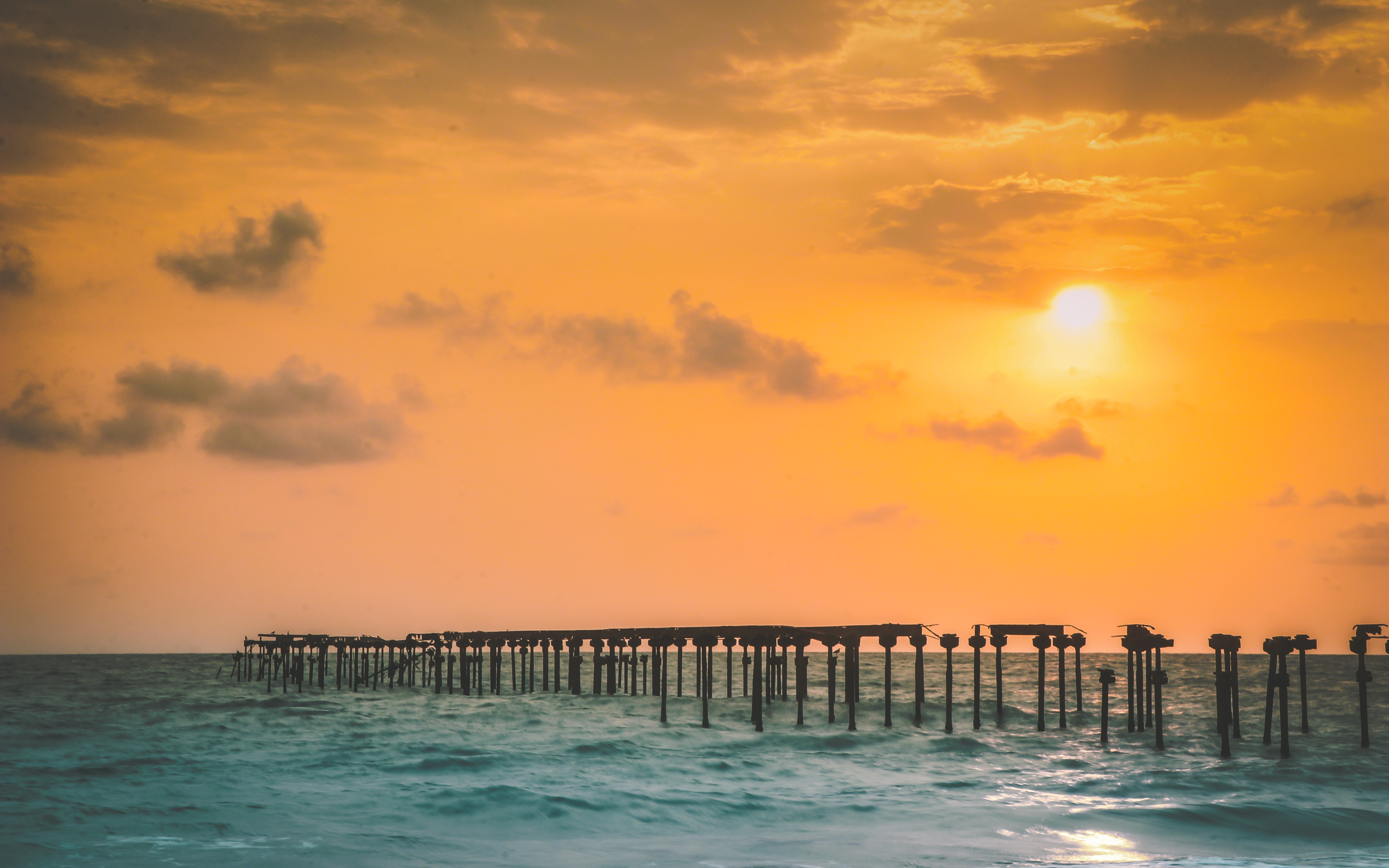
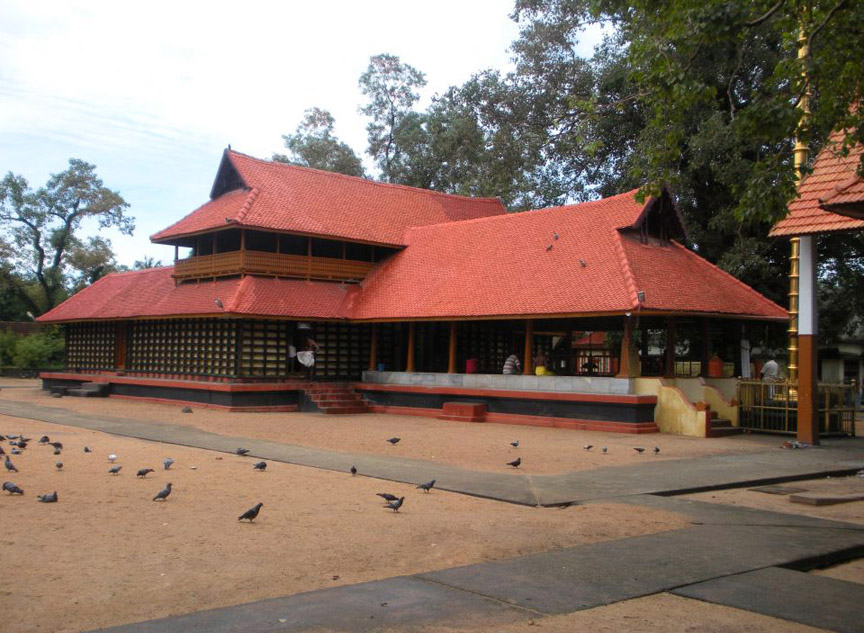
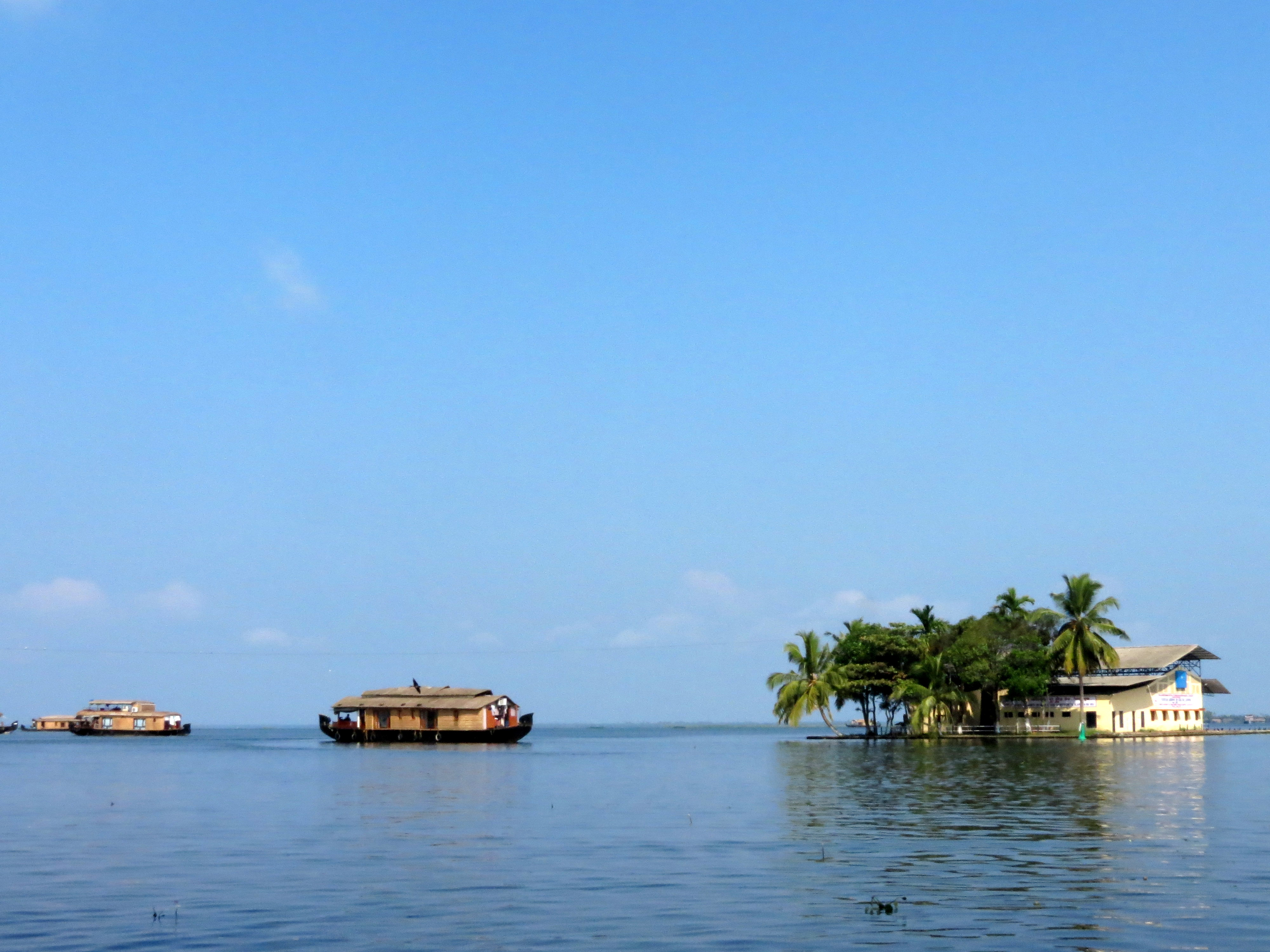
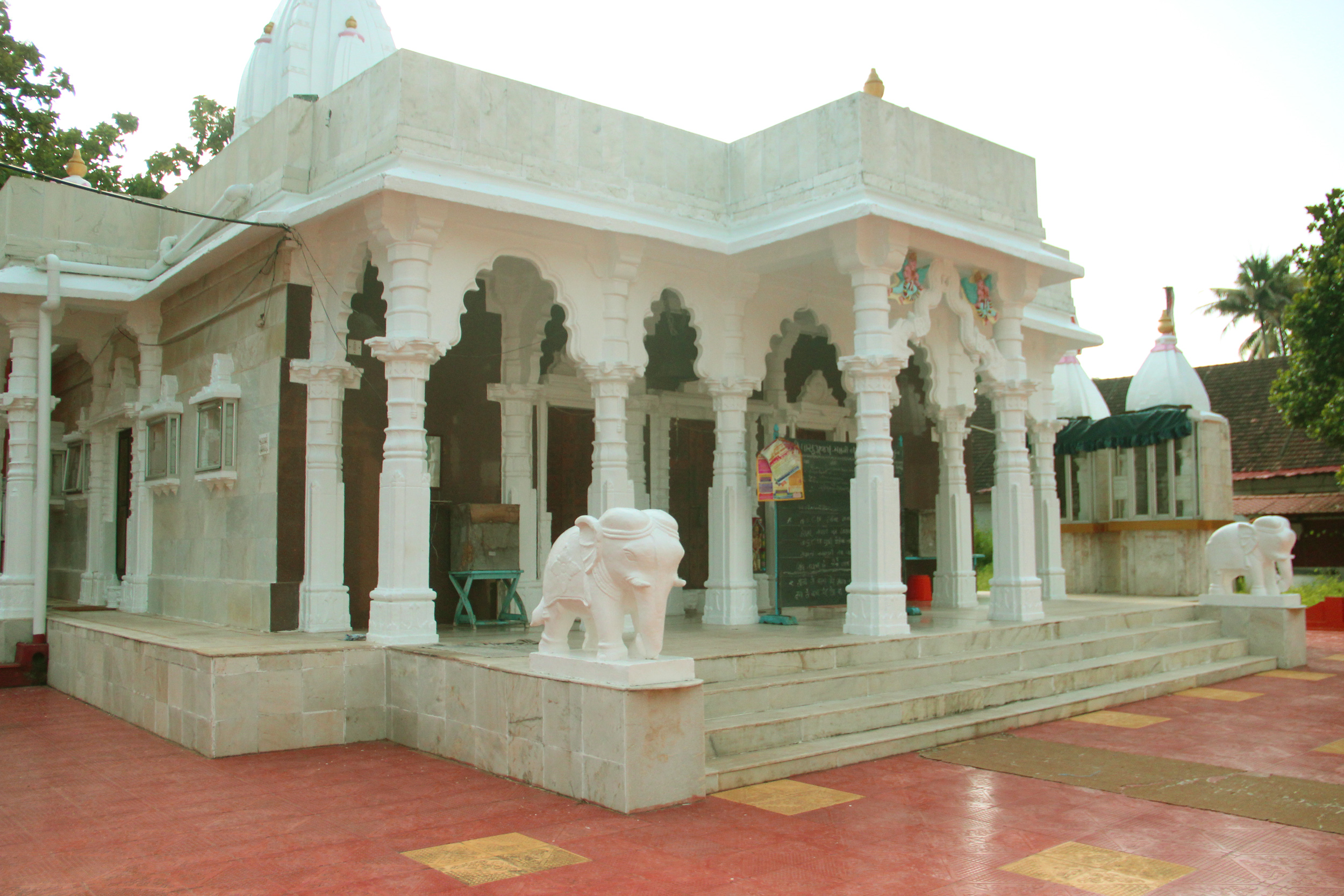
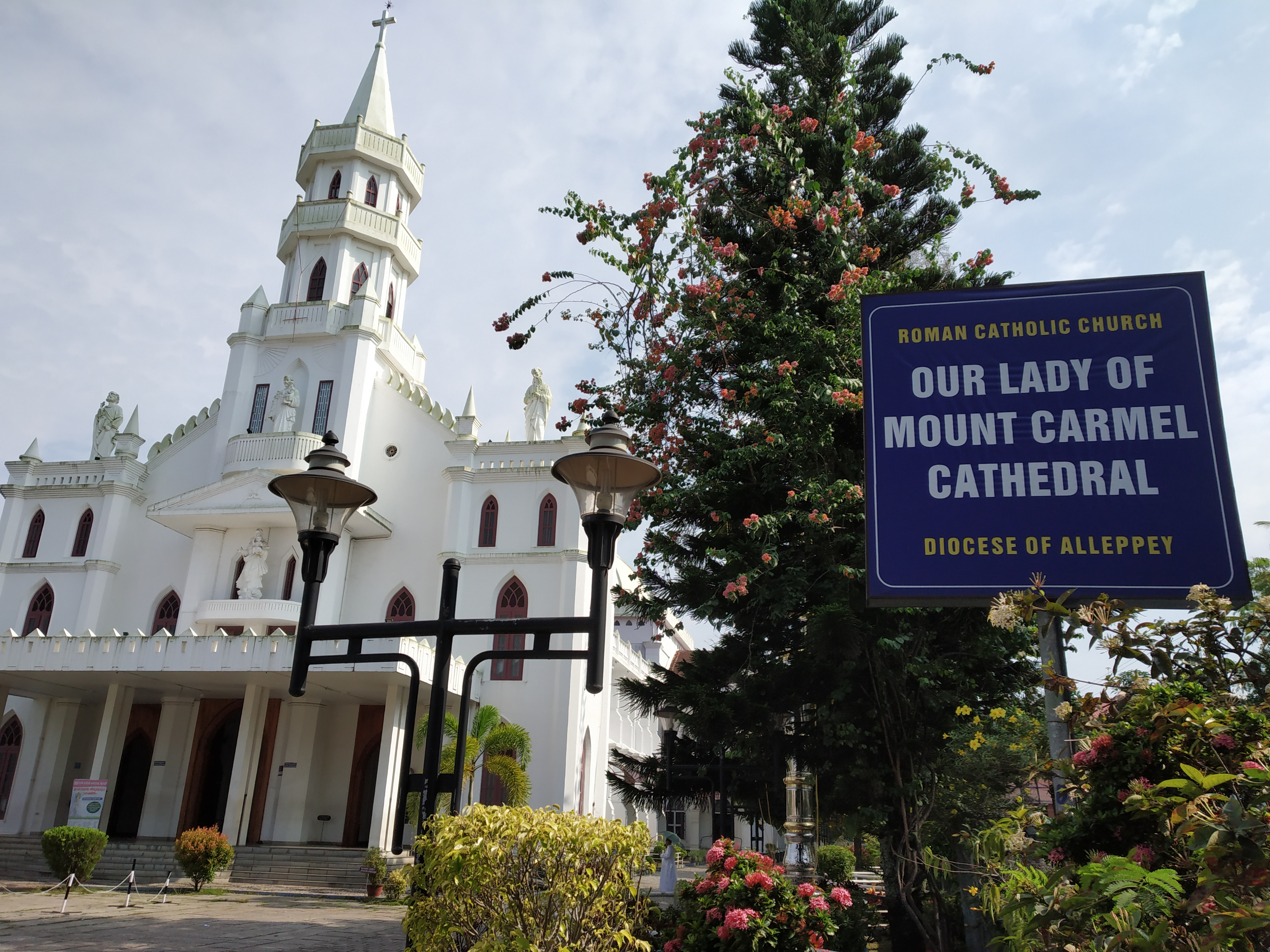
- Clockwise from top left: Alappuzha houseboat, Alappuzha Beach, Vembanad Lake, Mount Carmel Cathedral, Jain temple, Mullakkal Temple, State Highway 11 (Kerala)
- Nickname: "Venice of the East"
- Interactive map of Alappuzha
- Location within Kerala Location within India
- Coordinates: 9.49°N 76.33°E
- Country: India
- State: Kerala
- District: Alappuzha district
- Municipality: 1896

Government
  - Body: Alappuzha Municipality
  - Municipal Chairperson: Molly Jacob Indian National Congress

Area
  - Total: 65.57 km^{2} (25.32 sq mi)

Population (2011)
  - Total: 240,991
  - Rank: 6th
  - Density: 3,675/km^{2} (9,519/sq mi)

Languages
  - Official: Malayalam, English
- Time zone: UTC+5:30 (IST)
- PIN: 688001
- Telephone code: 0477
- Vehicle registration: KL-04 Alappuzha, KL-29 Kayamkulam; KL-30 Chengannur; KL-31 Mavelikkara; KL-32 Cherthala; KL-66 Kuttanad
- Sex ratio: 1079 ♂/♀
- Website: alappuzha.gov.in

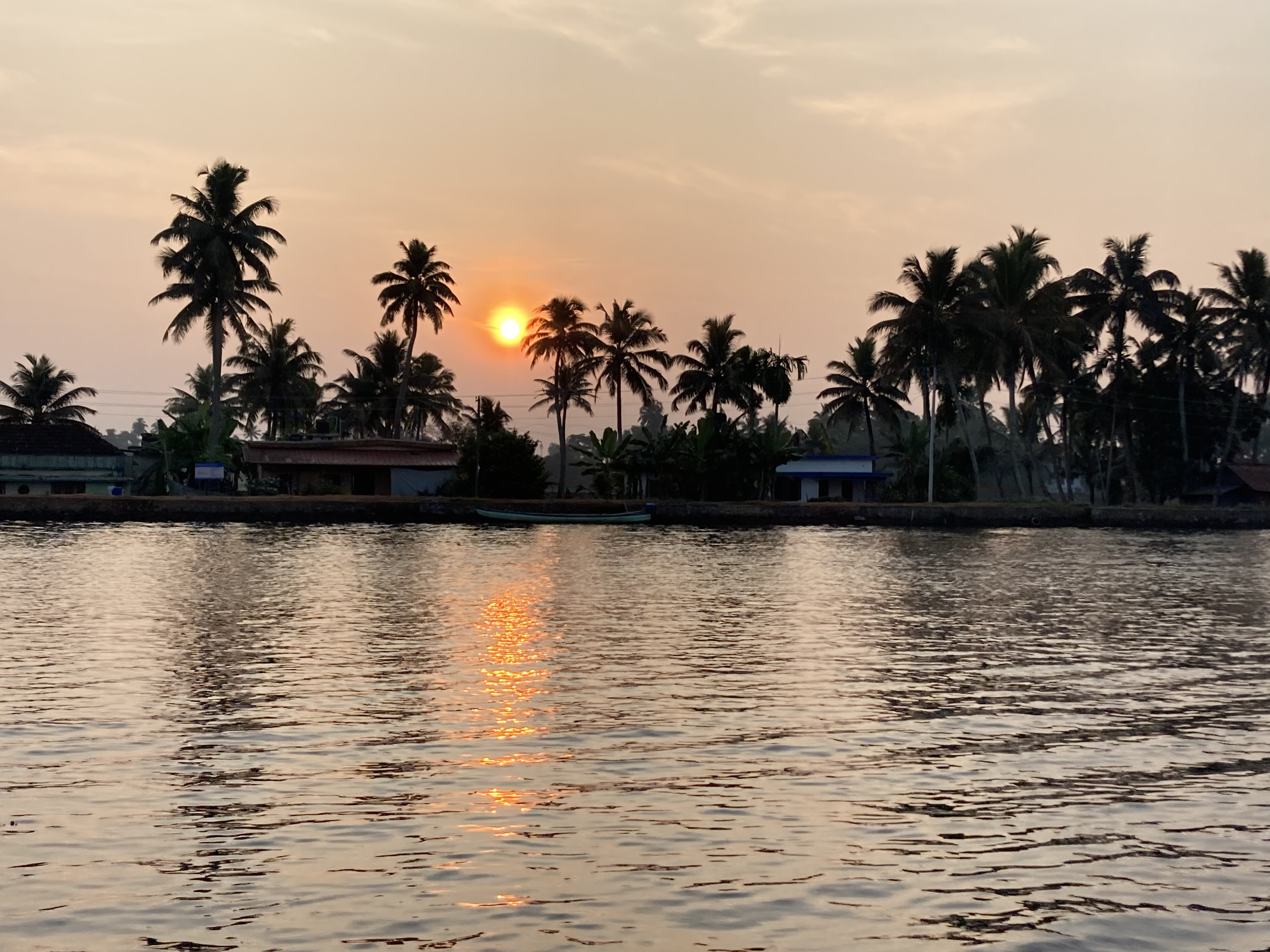
Sun rise view Alleppey backwaters, Kerala

Alappuzha (Malayalam: [aːlɐpːuɻɐ]) or Alleppey is a city and municipality on the Laccadive Sea in the southern Indian state of Kerala. It is the headquarters of Alappuzha district, located about 62 km (39 mi) south of the commercial city of Kochi and 152 km (94.4 mi) northwest of the state capital Thiruvananthapuram. As per the 2011 Indian census, Alappuzha has a population of 240,991 people, and a population density of 3,675/km^{2} (9,520/sq mi).

Alappuzha dates back to the Sangam era, and was mentioned by Pliny the Elder as far back as the 1st century AD as Baraces. Later in the 16th and 17th centuries, the town flourished as an important hub for trading spices with various European powers including the Dutch and the Portuguese. Under the rule of Raja Kesavadas, a port was constructed and canals for transport were laid throughout the city, and the town experienced rapid development. However, by the late 18th century, the region had come under British rule and experienced a decline in its status as a centre for commerce and culture.

Today, Alappuzha is a prominent tourist destination in Kerala. The town is famous for its waterways and backwaters. It's known as the Tarshish land of Kerala It plays a role as one of the primary access points for the annual Nehru Trophy Boat Race during the festival of Onam. Alappuzha is also a hub for coir manufacturing, and has a thriving coir industry.

== District Circumstances ==
Carved out of the erstwhile Kottayam and Kollam districts, Alappuzha district was formed on 17 August 1957 and consisted initially of seven taluks, namely Cherthala, Ambalappuzha, Kuttanad, Thiruvalla, Chengannur, Karthikappally and Mavelikkara.

The district is bounded on the north by Kochi and Kanayannur taluks of Ernakulam district, on the east by Vaikom, Kottayam and Changanassery taluks of Kottayam district and Thiruvalla, Kozhencherry and Adoor taluks of Pathanamthitta district, on the south by Kunnathur and Karunagappally taluks of Kollam district and on the west by Laccadive Sea.

The Alappuzha district comprises six taluks, namely Cherthala, Ambalappuzha, Kuttanad, Karthikappally, Chengannur and Mavelikkara. The area of the district is 1,414 km^{2} (546 sq mi).

== History ==
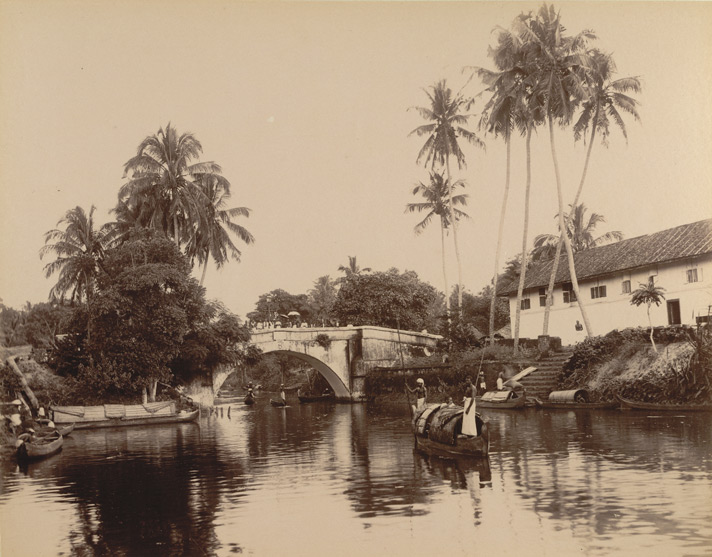
Stone Bridge in 1900.

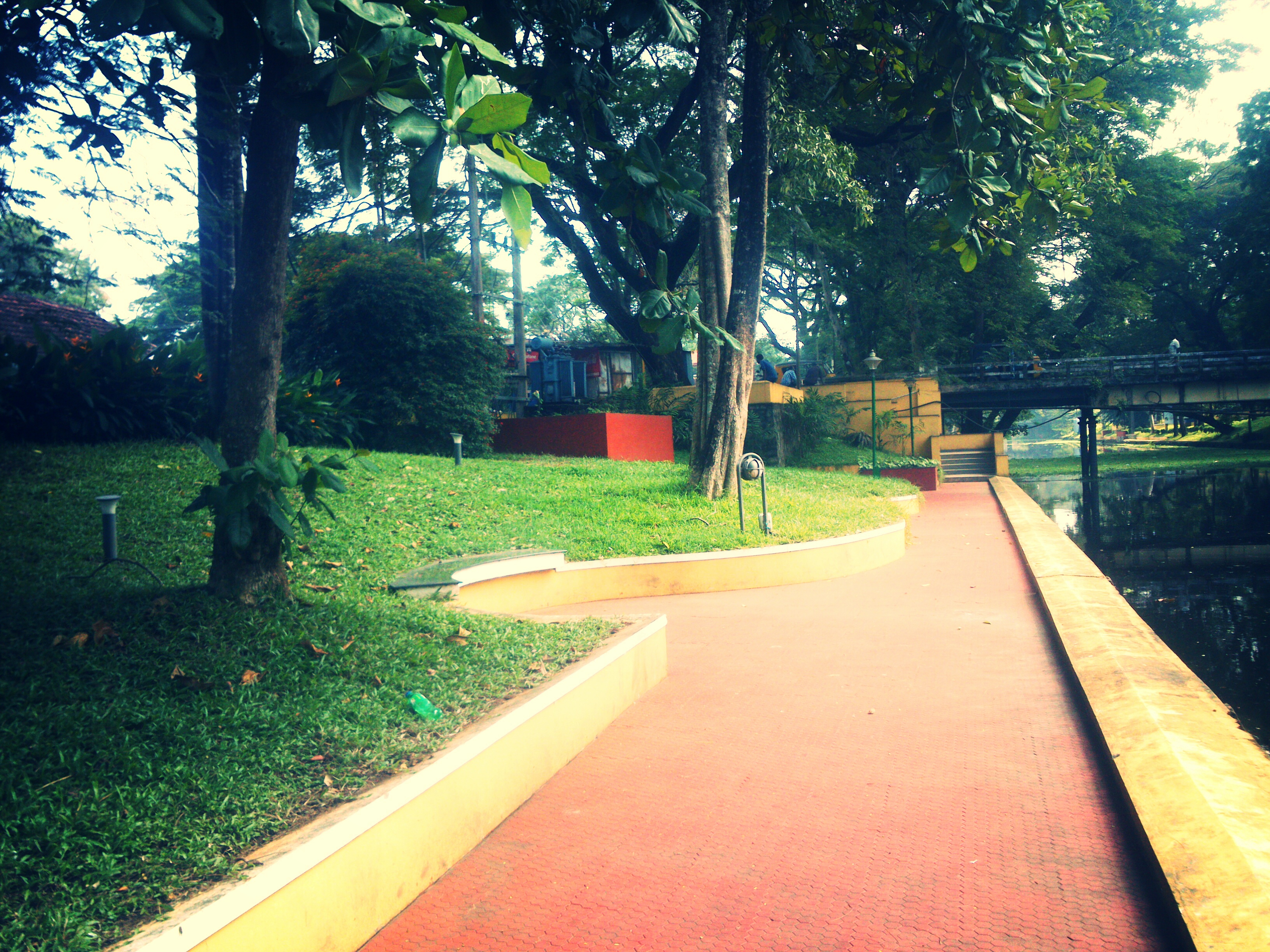
Walkway in Commercial Canal

Kuttanad, the rice bowl of Kerala, with its paddy fields, small streams and canals with lush green coconut palms, was well known even from the early periods of the Sangam age.

Literary works such as Unnuneeli Sandesam give some insight into the ancient period of this district. Archaeological antiquities, such as the stone inscriptions, historical monuments found in the temples, churches, and rock-cut caves, also emphasise the historic importance of Alappuzha District.

Christianity had a foothold in this district, even from the 1st century AD. The church located at Kokkamangalam was one of the seven churches founded by St Thomas, one of the twelve disciples of Jesus Christ. It is generally believed that he landed at Maliankara in Muziris Port, presently known as Cranganore or Kodungallur, in 52 AD and preached Christianity in South India.

The district flourished in religion and culture under the second Chera Empire, during 9th to 12th centuries AD. The literary work `Ascharya Choodamani`, a Sanskrit drama written by Sakthibhadran, a scholar of Chengannur, enables us to know many pertinent facts. Further, the temple on Lord Ayyappan, in Mukkal vattam near Muhamma in Alappuzha District, is called Cheerappanchira, for the Kalari from which Lord Ayyappa learnt his martial arts. A recent album by P. Unni Krishnan on Lord Ayyappa, titled 'Sabarimalai Va Charanam Solli Va', has songs illustrating the history of this temple and Lord Ayyappa's stay here before he went to conquer the Mahishi Demon.

Since landing in Kozhikode in 1498, the Portuguese started playing an influential role in Alappuzha. They began by spreading Catholicism and converting already existing Christians into Catholics. St Andrew's Basilica was built during this period.

In the 17th century, as the Portuguese power declined, the Dutch gained a predominant position in the principalities of this district. They built many factories and warehouses for storing pepper and ginger, relying on several treaties signed between the Dutch and the Rajas of Purakkad, Kayamkulam and Karappuram. In course of time they also delved into the political and cultural affairs of the district. At that time Maharaja Marthanda Varma (1706–1758), who was the 'Maker of modern Travancore', intervened in the political affairs of those princedoms.

Travancore Dewan Ramayyan Dalawa (d. 1756) resided in Mavelikkara where he had a palace built by Marthanda Varma. After the death of his wife, Ramayyan consorted with a Nair lady from Mavelikkara of the Edassery family (PGN Unnithan, a member of this family, later became the last Dewan of Travancore in 1947). After his death Ramayyan's descendants left Travancore to settle in Pudukkottai in Tamil Nadu. His Nair consort was given gifts and presents and special allowances from the Travancore government in recognition of his services to the state while his own descendants were bestowed with the honorific title of Dalawa.

In the 19th century the district saw progress in many spheres. One of the five subordinate courts opened in the state in connection with the reorganization of the judicial system by Colonel George Monro was located at Mavelikkara. The first post office and first telegraph office in the former Travancore state were established in this district. The first manufacturing factory for the coir mats was established in 1859. In 1894 the city Improvement Committee was set up.

The district played a role in the freedom struggle of the country. The struggles of Punnapra and Vayalar in 1946 arrayed the people against Sir C. P. Ramaswami Iyer, who was Dewan of Travancore. This led to Ramaswami Iyer's exit from the political scene of Travancore. A popular Ministry was formed in Travancore on 24 March 1948 after India's independence. Travancore and Cochin states were integrated on 1 July 1949. This arrangement continued until the formation of Kerala State on 1 November 1956, under the States Reorganisation Act 1956. The district came into existence as a separate administrative unit on 1 August 1957.

=== Raja Kesavadas and Alappuzha ===
Raja Kesavadas, the Dewan of Travancore during the reign of Dharma Raja Karthika Thirunal Rama Varma in 18th century was well known for his planning skills and administrative acumen. He was the master mind in developing the Alappuzha town.

He found Alappuzha as an ideal location and began constructing a well planned port city in Travancore. Alappuzha was most suitable, because of the geographical and oceanic reasons. He constructed two parallel canals for bringing goods to port from backwaters and offered infrastructural facilities to merchants and traders from Surat, Mumbai and Kutch to start industrial enterprises, trading, and cargo centres. Alappuzha attained progress and became the financial nerve centre of Travancore during his time. The port was opened in 1762, mainly for the export of coir-matting and coir-yarn. Kesavadas built three ships for trade with Calcutta and Bombay, and alleppey afforded a convenient depot for the storage and disposal of goods produce in the east.

== Geography ==
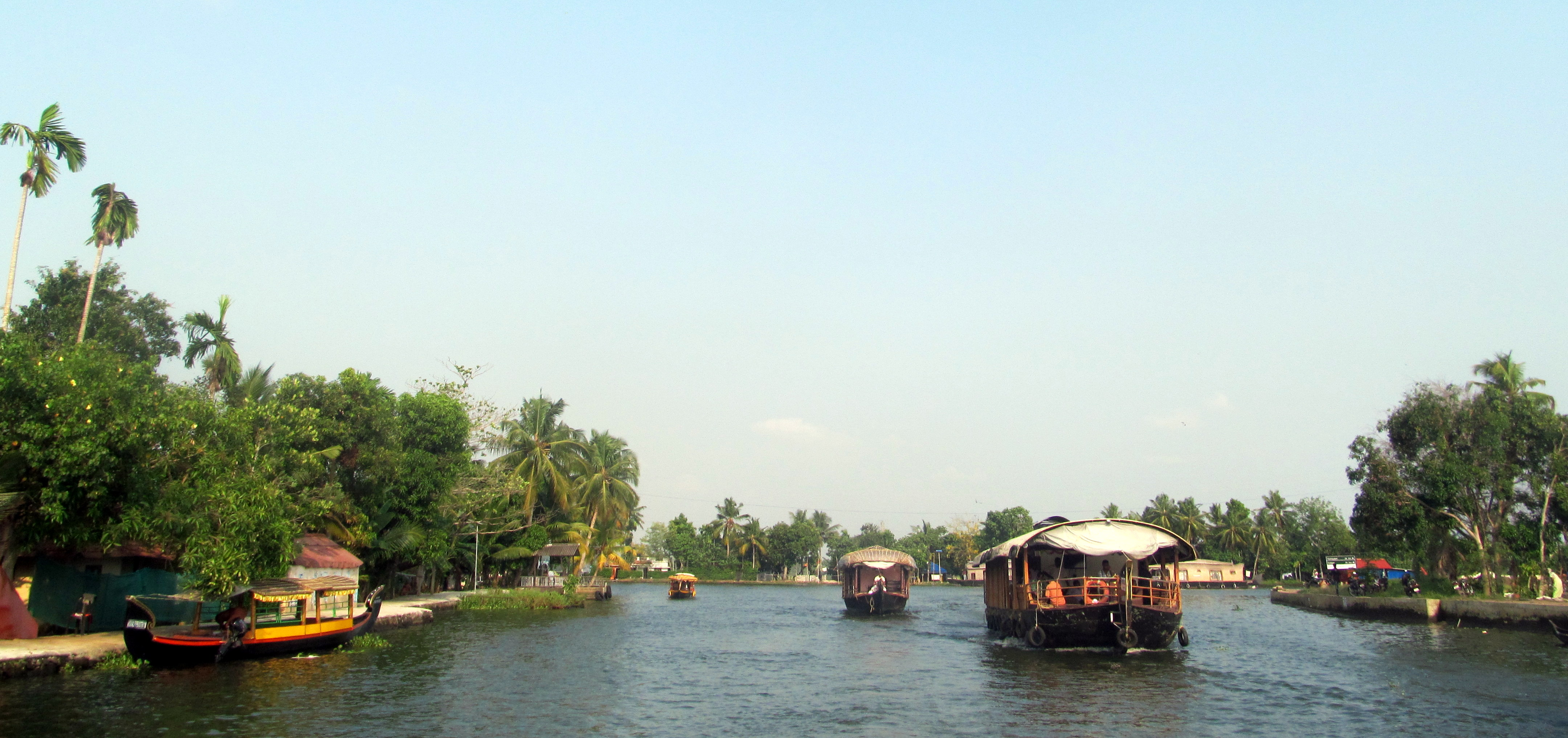
Vembanad Lake

Alappuzha is located at 9.54°N 76.40°E. The average elevation is 1 metre (3.3 ft). Alappuzha covers an area of 1,414 square kilometres (546 sq mi) and is flanked by 2,195 square kilometres (847 sq mi) of Vembanad Lake, where six major rivers spread out before joining the 80 km coast line of the district. The city of Alappuzha is crisscrossed by a system of canals, which is a part of the National Waterway 3.

The district is a sandy strip of land intercepted by lagoons, rivers and canals. There are no mountains or hills in the district except some scattered hillocks lying between Bharanikkavu and Chengannur blocks in the eastern portion of the district. There are no forest area in this district.

Alappuzha is bounded by the Laccadive Sea on its west. The town has a network of lakes, lagoons and fresh water rivers. The richness of the coastal Alappuzha waters is expressed annually in the blooming and consequent deposit of a huge quantity of fishes and prawns on the Alappuzha coast called ‘[Chakara]’. This annual shifting of sandbank appears during the post-monsoon period and contributes to the local economy and is a festive season for the people of Kerala. The annual floods rejuvenate and cleanse the soil and water due to which there is abundance of marine life like prawns, lobsters, fishes, turtles and other flora in the sea.

The backwaters and wetlands host thousands of migrant common teal, ducks and cormorants every year who reach here from long distances. A major feature of the area is the region called Kuttanad, the 'granary of Kerala'. Kuttanad is also known as the rice bowl of Kerala and is one of the few places in the world where farming is done below sea level. The paddy fields lie about 0.6 to 2 m below mean sea level.

=== Climate ===
Owing to its proximity to the sea, the climate of Alappuzha is humid and hot during the summer, although it remains fairly cool and pleasant during the months of October and November. The average monthly temperature is 27 degrees Celsius. The district gets the benefit of two seasonal monsoons, as in other parts of the state. Alappuzha town experiences a long monsoon season with heavy showers as both the Southwest and Northeast monsoon influences the weather of Alappuzha. The South-west monsoon affects the climate in the months from June to September. On the other hand, the North-east monsoon brings rain from October to November. The average rainfall received by the region is 2763 mm.

Climate data for Alappuzha (1991–2020, extremes 1944–2012)
Month	Jan	Feb	Mar	Apr	May	Jun	Jul	Aug	Sep	Oct	Nov	Dec	Year
Record high °C (°F)	36.7 (98.1)	37.4 (99.3)	37.9 (100.2)	38.2 (100.8)	36.7 (98.1)	37.2 (99.0)	34.0 (93.2)	34.2 (93.6)	34.8 (94.6)	35.6 (96.1)	35.4 (95.7)	36.6 (97.9)	38.2 (100.8)
Mean daily maximum °C (°F)	32.7 (90.9)	33.0 (91.4)	33.6 (92.5)	33.7 (92.7)	32.8 (91.0)	30.4 (86.7)	29.4 (84.9)	29.6 (85.3)	30.5 (86.9)	31.3 (88.3)	32.0 (89.6)	32.5 (90.5)	31.8 (89.2)
Mean daily minimum °C (°F)	22.5 (72.5)	23.6 (74.5)	25.0 (77.0)	25.4 (77.7)	25.3 (77.5)	23.9 (75.0)	23.2 (73.8)	23.5 (74.3)	23.8 (74.8)	23.8 (74.8)	23.8 (74.8)	22.9 (73.2)	23.9 (75.0)
Record low °C (°F)	17.3 (63.1)	18.7 (65.7)	18.8 (65.8)	19.2 (66.6)	20.0 (68.0)	19.5 (67.1)	19.9 (67.8)	19.4 (66.9)	20.4 (68.7)	19.3 (66.7)	20.0 (68.0)	17.8 (64.0)	17.3 (63.1)
Average rainfall mm (inches)	16.3 (0.64)	42.1 (1.66)	62.7 (2.47)	131.7 (5.19)	274.1 (10.79)	592.0 (23.31)	485.9 (19.13)	349.8 (13.77)	296.5 (11.67)	357.4 (14.07)	175.8 (6.92)	48.2 (1.90)	2,832.4 (111.51)
Average rainy days	1.0	1.9	3.3	6.7	11.6	21.3	21.4	16.6	13.8	15.0	8.5	2.9	123.9
Average relative humidity (%) (at 17:30 IST)	68	70	73	74	78	86	88	87	84	81	78	71	86
Source: India Meteorological Department

== Demographics ==
Religion in Alappuzha City (2011)
	Percent
Hinduism	49.85%
Christianity	26.23%
Islam	23.62%
Others	0.30%

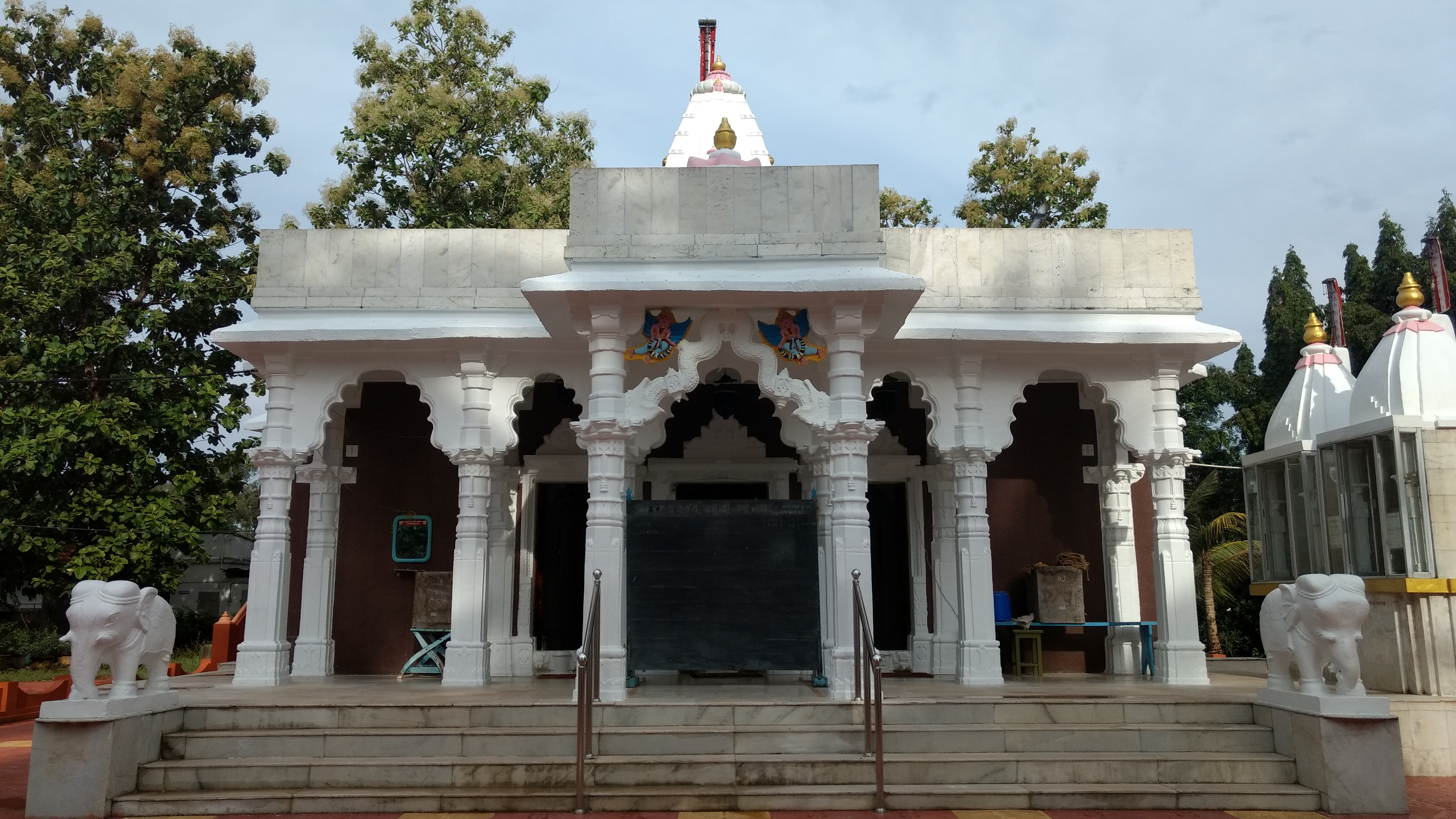
Jain Temple, Alappuzha

Historical population
Year	Pop.	±%
1991	174,666	—
2001	239,384	+37.1%
2011	240,991	+0.7%
Sources: 1991-2011

According to the 2011 census, Alappuzha Municipality+Outgrowths had a population of 240,991 with 116,439 men and 124,552 women. The City spreads over Alappuzha municipality and the outgrowths of Punnapra and Kalarcode villages with an area of 65.57 km^{2} (25.32 sq mi) and population density of 3,675 persons per square kilometre. There were 22,361 persons under six years of age. The literacy rate of Alappuzha city stands at 95.81% with 209,201 literates where 101,927 are males (97.3%) and 107,274 are females (94.43%). Alappuzha had a sex ratio of 1070.

The population is predominantly Hindus, and there are sizeable numbers of Christians and Muslims. The most widely spoken language is Malayalam, although many people speak Konkani.

Malankara Orthodox Christians in the town of Alappuzha are covered by the Diocese of Niranam of the Malankara Orthodox Syrian Church. The largest Orthodox Church in the town currently is Saint Thomas Orthodox Church, Alappuzha which also runs Mar Gregorios Karunya Theeram Guidance Centre in Alappuzha.

The standard dialect of Malayalam spoken is Central Travancore dialect. Konkani is a language that is spoken in the Konkan region. During the Portuguese and Dutch invasions of the 16th and 18th centuries, many Konkanis migrated southwards to Thuravoor, Cherthala and Alappuzha in the state of Travancore as well as other places in Kerala like Cochin, Kodungalloor, and Kollam. A majority of these people got settled in Alappuzha.

== Economy ==
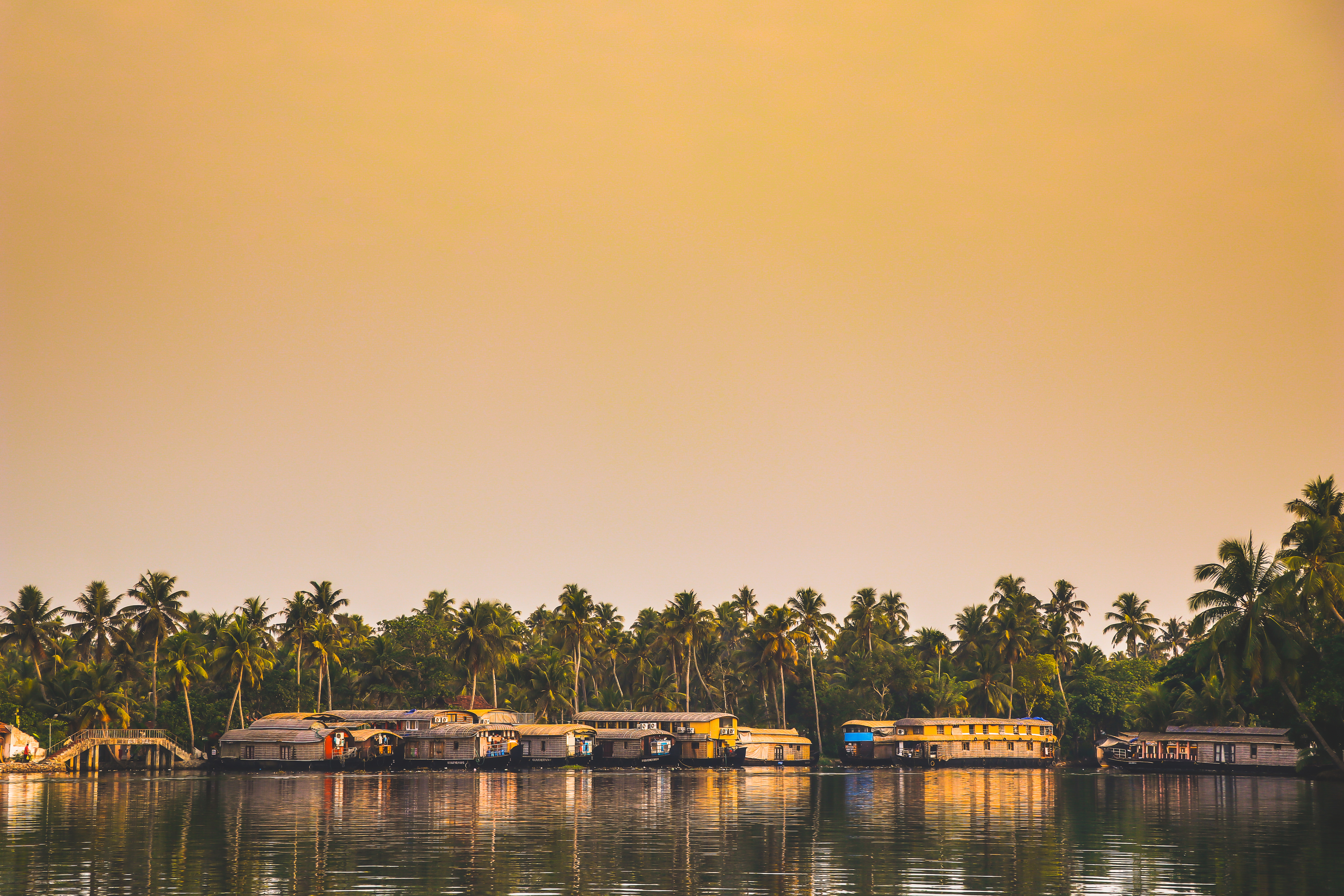
Houseboats in Alleppey

The economy of the district is based on agriculture and marine products. The agricultural activities predominantly revolve around the Kuttanad region, the rice bowl of Kerala. Though the district is industrially backward, some traditional industries based on coir and coir products, marine products, handlooms, different types of handicrafts, toddy tapping have been active from the very early times. The district is known as the traditional home of coir industry in Kerala.

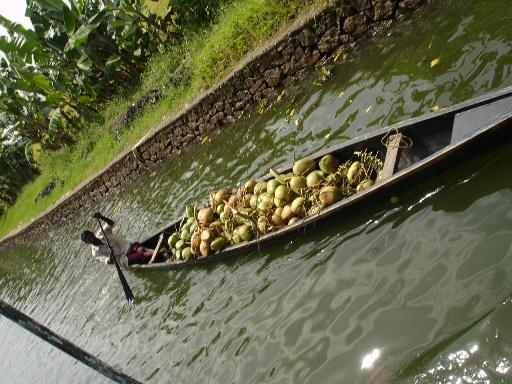
Alappuzha has extensive backwaters used for transportation and tourism purposes too.

The availability of raw materials and the existence of backwaters and canals suitable for the getting of green husk and accessibility of transportation are the main factors of the development of this industry. Arabs had carried on trade in coir products from very ancient period. The manufacture of mats and mattings were first introduced in 1859 by James Durragh.

The Coir Board was established by the Central Government under the provisions of the Coir Industry Act in 1955. A coir research institute functions at Kalavoor. The National Coir Training and Designing Centre was established at Alappuzha in 1965.

Coir is the most important commodity manufactured in Alappuzha, Kayamkulam, Kokkothamangalam, Komalapuram, Mannancherry, Muhamma and Vayalar. Coir products are available in Cherthala and Mannancherry, lime shell in Arookutty and Kodamthuruth, plywood in Chengannur, Keltron controls in Aroor, potassium chloride in Mavelikkara, and coconuts and coconut oil in Thanneermukkom. Other important commodities manufactured in these towns are copra, glass, mats and matches.

Some of the popular firms in Alappuzha are Jayadarshana Creations, 7steps Event Management Group, Lic Of India, The New India Assurance Company Ltd, The Oriental Insurance Company Ltd, Reliance General Insurance Company Ltd, Bajaj Allianz Life Insurance Co Ltd, Exide Life Insurance Company Ltd, Bharti Axa Life Insurance Company Ltd., Sbi Life Insurance Company Limited, Max Life Insurance Co Ltd, Iffco Tokio General Insurance Company Ltd, Star Health & Allied Insurance Co Ltd, Kerala Financial Corporation, A.R.T. Leasing LTD, Uno Creations, Southindian Technologies, Dipsan Web Solutions.

In recent times, tourism has become a major source of revenue. This is mainly due to the presence of houseboats that provide the tourists with a view of the scenic backwaters of the town. Another reason is the proximity to other tourist spots like Munnar, Varkala and Wayanad. Furthermore, as per the Tourist Statistics by Kerala Tourism, there is a 74.55% increase in tourists arriving in Alleppey between 2021 and 2020 while the average for the entire state stands at 51.09%. In 2025, 550843 domestic tourists and 45566 foreign tourists visited Alappuzha.

== Backwater paddy cultivation ==
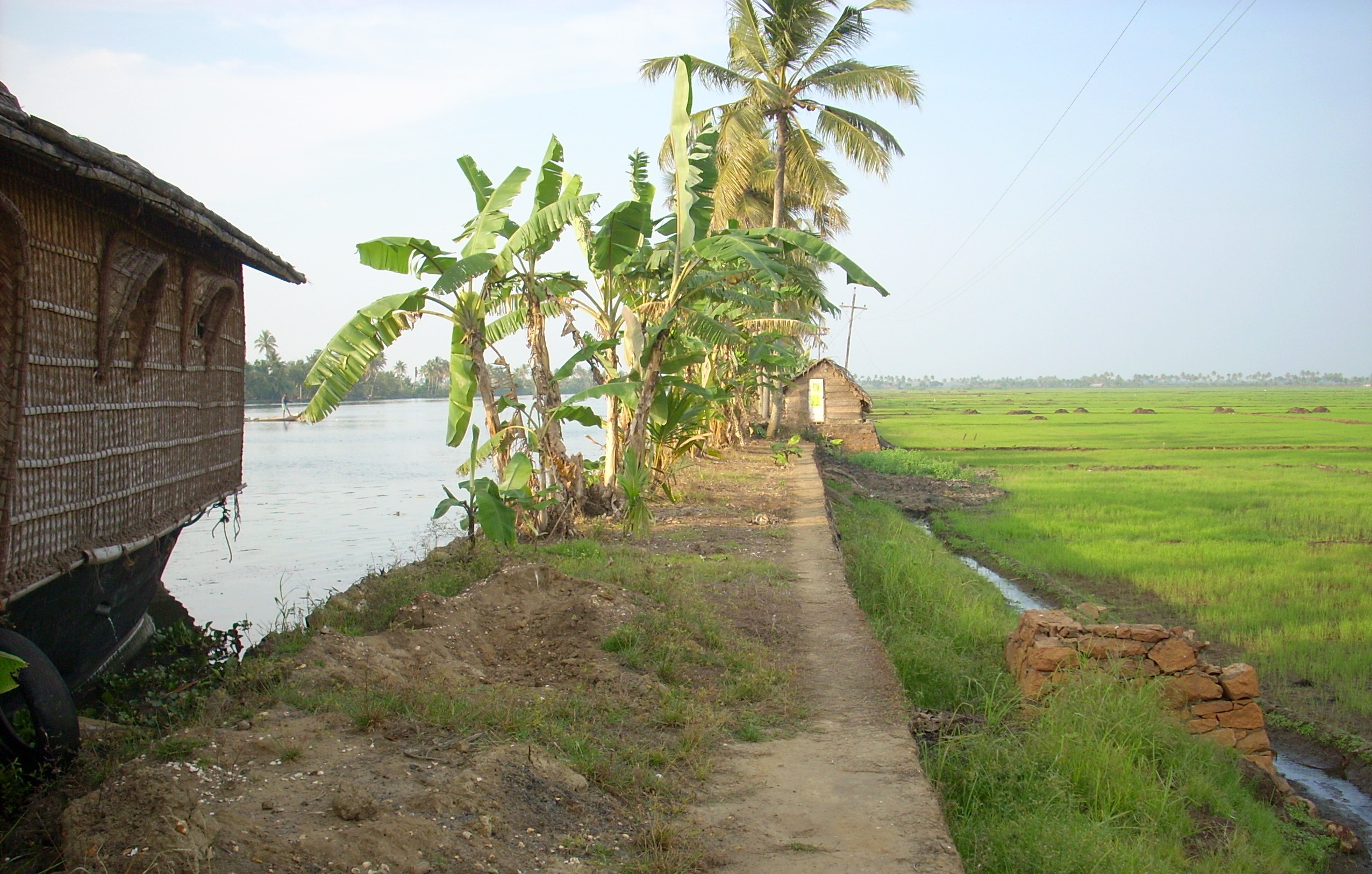
Paddy fields in Kuttanad

The major occupation in Alappuzha is farming. The Rice Bowl of Kerala, Kuttanadu is located in Alappuzha.

There were three stages in the reclamation of lands from the Vembanad Lake. In the first stage it was carried out by private entrepreneurs without any financial support from the part of the government. The Pattom Proclamation, made by the Travancore Kingdom in the year 1865, gave a great boost to the reclamation activities between 1865 and 1890. During this period de-watering of the polders were done manually, using waterwheels, restricting large-scale reclamations. Only about 250 hectares of land were reclaimed during this period. Venadu Lake and Madathil Lake that were reclaimed during this period are considered as the first Kayal Nilam (lake-reclaimed land) which were reclaimed from Vembanad Lake. The pioneering reclamation activity of lake-reclamation and cultivation was made by Pallithanam Luca Matthai.

The second phase was from (1890 to 1903).

Due to the steep decline in the price of rice during 1920 to 1940, the reclamation activities became sluggish, then gained momentum again in the early 1940s. During this period, in order to increase the agricultural output, government initiated a Grow More Food campaign and provided incentives to encourage new reclamations. The advent of electric motors made the reclamation easier, cheaper and less risky as compared to the earlier periods. The last tract of the reclamations namely Q, S and T block were made during this period.

=== Reconstruction of Muppalam Bridge ===
The iconic Muppalam, or Triple bridge, in the heart of Alappuzha town was once a major attraction for tourists and filmmakers.

Reconstruction began to build a new four-lane bridge, popularly referred to as Nalpalam. The bridge connects two major canals, Vada Canal and Commercial Canal and has been an integral part of Alappuzha’s road network and identity.

The bridge has featured in over 100 films across various Indian languages Malayalam, Hindi, Tamil, Telugu, and Kannada, highlighting its cinematic appeal.

The Muppalam was dismantled to make way for a more modern, four-lane replacement known locally as Nalpalam. The project led by the Kerala Public Works Department (PWD), while preserving the cultural and visual significance of the location.

== Transport ==
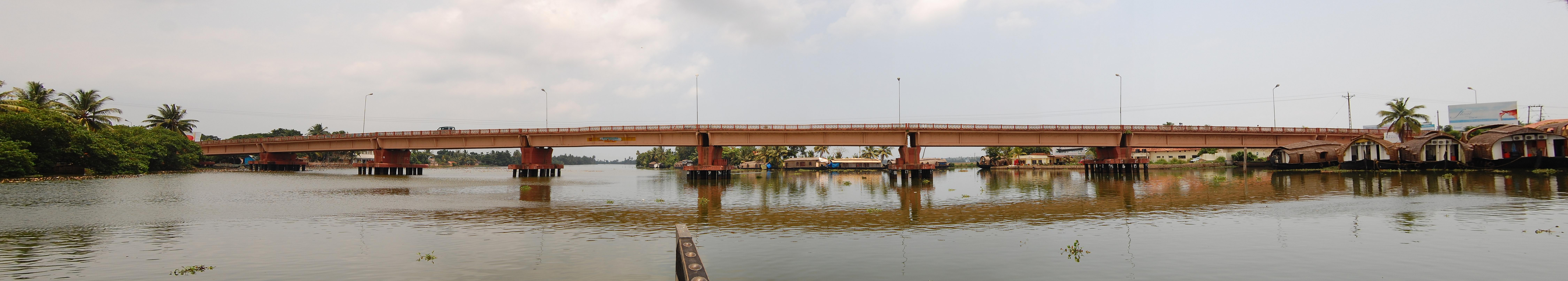
Pallathuruthy bridge

=== Road ===
==== National highways ====
Nation Highway 66, connecting Panvel to Kanyakumari runs through the Alappuzha city centre. The Alappuzha Bypass was built to route the national highway around city centers between Kommady and Kalarkode. National Highway 66 connects Alappuzha city to other major cities like Mumbai, Udupi, Mangalore, Kannur, Kozhikode, Ernakulam, Kollam and Thiruvananthapuram. There is a plan to upgrade State Highway 11 to a national highway in order to help connect Alappuzha to Kodaikanal as part of promoting the coastal-hill tourism project.

==== State highways ====
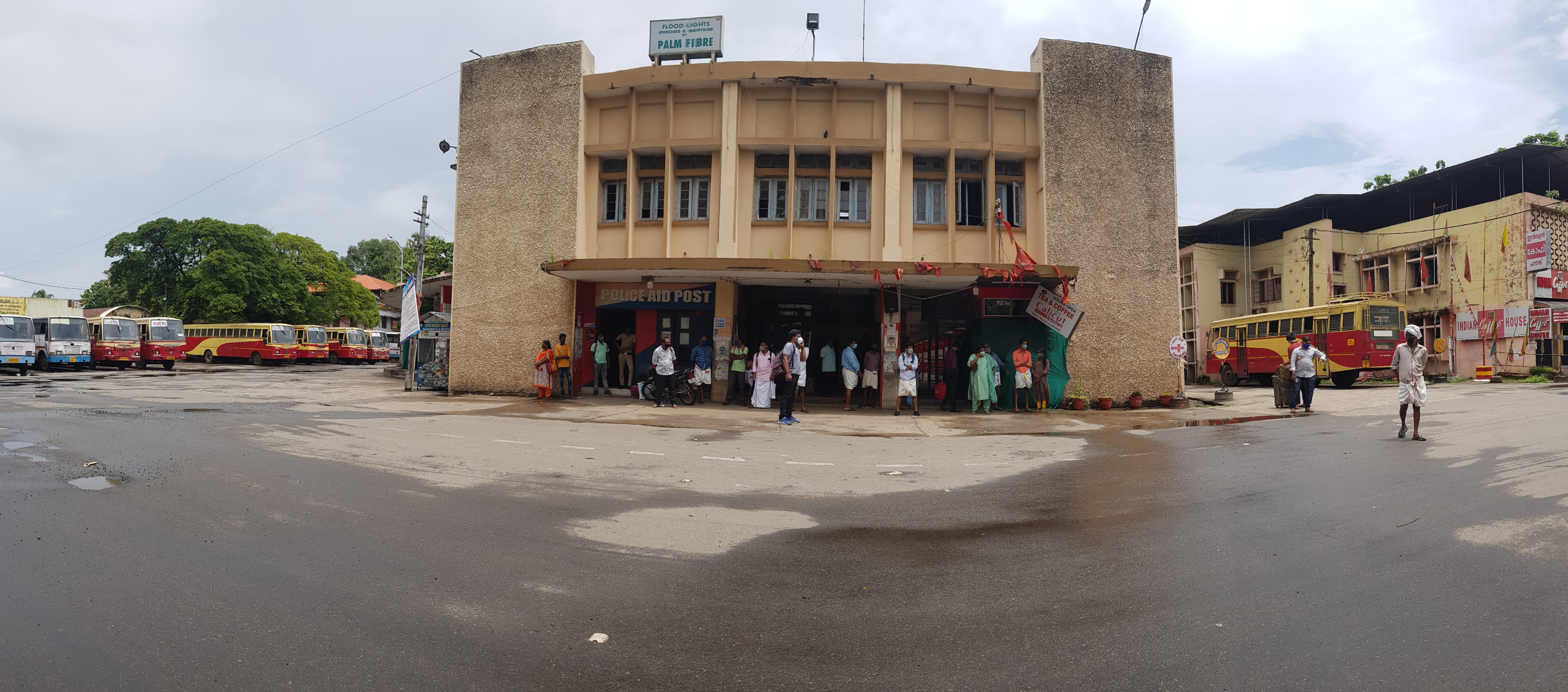
Alappuzha KSRTC bus station

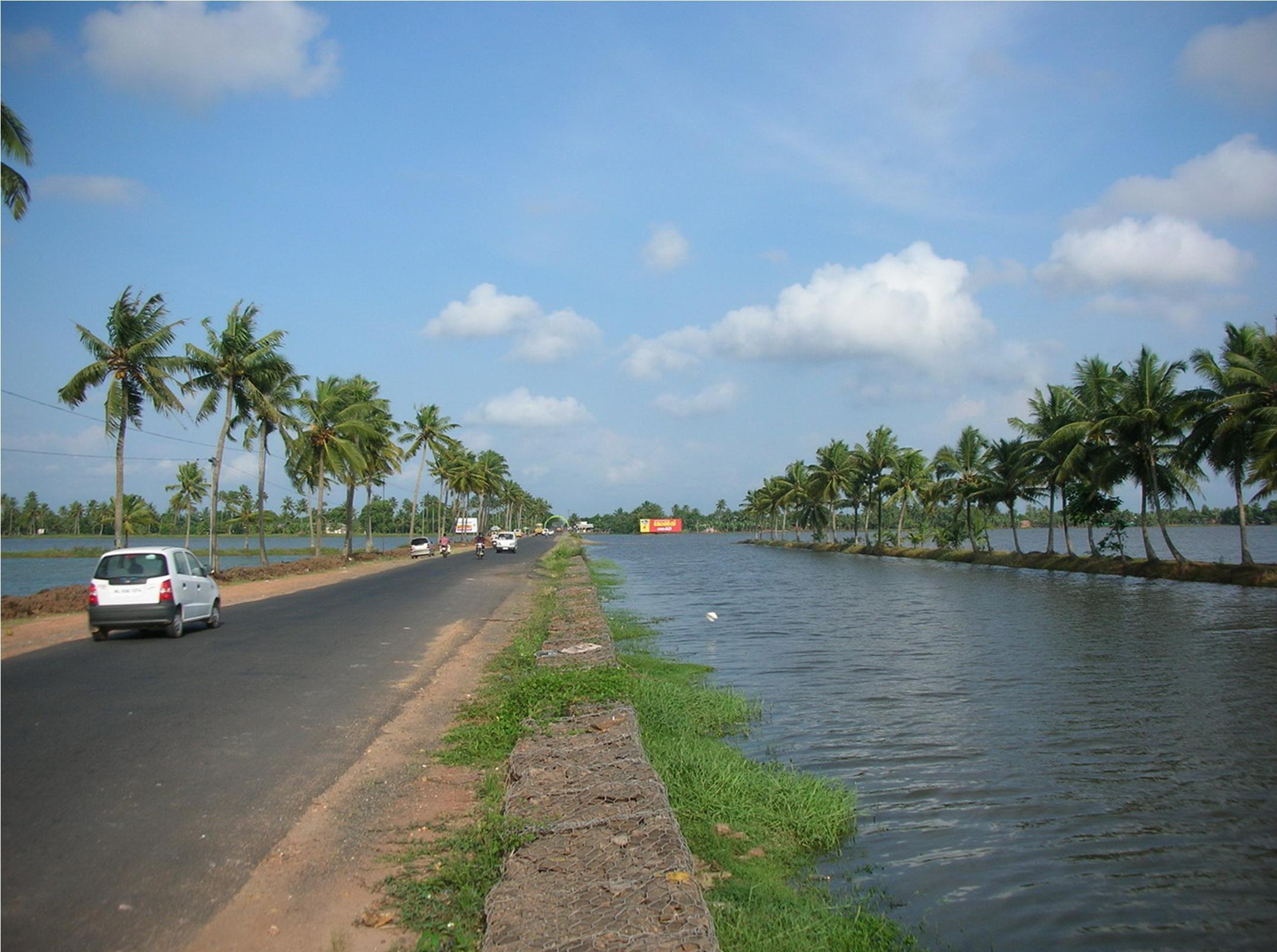
State Highway 11

There are eight state highways in Alappuzha district, of which three of them originates from Alappuzha town. State Highway 11 starts from Kalarcode and ends at Perunna. This highway is locally known as AC road (Alappuzha-Changanassery road) and it covers a distance of 24.2 km. It is an important road which connects Alappuzha town with Kottayam district. Stateway High 40 is an interstate highway in Alappuzha district which connects Alappuzha town with Madurai in Tamil Nadu. It is the only interstate highway in Alappuzha district. State Highway 66 originates from Alappuzha town and terminates at Thoppumpady.

Alappuzha has two main bus terminals. The Kerala State Road Transport Corporation bus station (situated near state water transport corporation headquarters, boat jetty road) serves government-run buses and the V K soman memorial municipal bus stand (situated near Vazhicherry) is used by private buses and contract carriage services operating to other states.

KSRTC buses connect Alappuzha with, among other places, Banglore, Mysore, Kollur, Mangalore, Chennai, Coimbatore, Thiruvananthapuram, and Thiruvalla. Additionally SETC and TNSTC operate several daily services to and from the town. Karnataka State Road Transport Corporation reportedly run two daily services originating from Alappuzha.

A new KSRTC depot and bus station are under construction in Valavanadu along National Highway 66. This development aims to enhance connectivity and improve transportation infrastructure in the region

=== Water ===
The presence of a lot of backwaters and canals makes water transport a popular means of transport. National Waterway-3 passes through Alappuzha. There is a SWTD boat jetty in the city that lies opposite to the KSRTC bus stand. It is served by boat services to Kottayam city and besides other small towns and jetties. Availing an SWTD boat is a cheaper alternative to houseboats for visiting tourists.

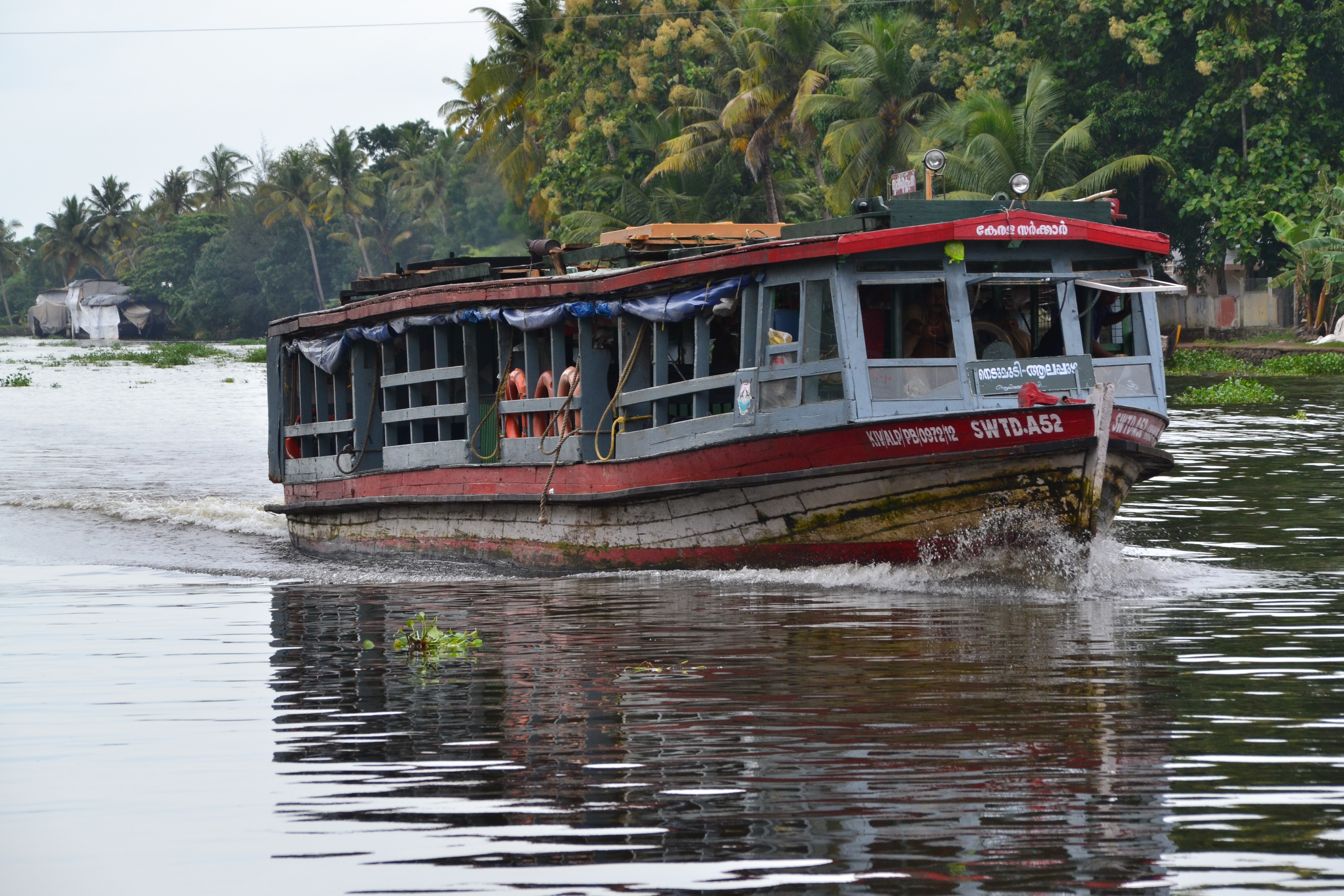
Public water transport organised by Kerala State Transport Agency for long-distance transport within the back waters of Kerala

=== Railway ===
Alappuzha is linked by Ernakulam–Kayamkulam coastal railway line and connects to cities like Thiruvananthapuram, Kollam, Kochi, Coimbatore, Chennai, Delhi, Bokaro and Mumbai. The railway station is about 4 kilometres (2.5 mi) from the heart of the city. A total of four trains originate from Alappuzha to cities like Kannur, Chennai, Dhanbad and Tatanagar. There are a lot of local trains running throughout the day, which connect Alappuzha to other towns near by. Since Alappuzha is a prime destination, trains from important cities like Delhi, Chandigarh, Bangalore, Mangalore, Kozhikode and Amritsar pass through this station.

=== Airport ===
Cochin International Airport, which is 78 kilometres (48 mi) to the North, is the closest airport. Thiruvananthapuram International Airport, 159 kilometres (99 mi) to the South, is the other airport that links the district with other countries. International tourists use these airports to reach Alappuzha. The other nearest airports are Calicut (236 kilometres (147 mi)) and Coimbatore (254 kilometres (158 mi)) airports. A helipad in the town is reserved for government uses.

== Administration and politics ==
Alappuzha city officials
District Collector	Alex Varghese IAS
Municipal chairperson	Molly Jacob
SP & District Police Chief	MP Mohanachandran IPS

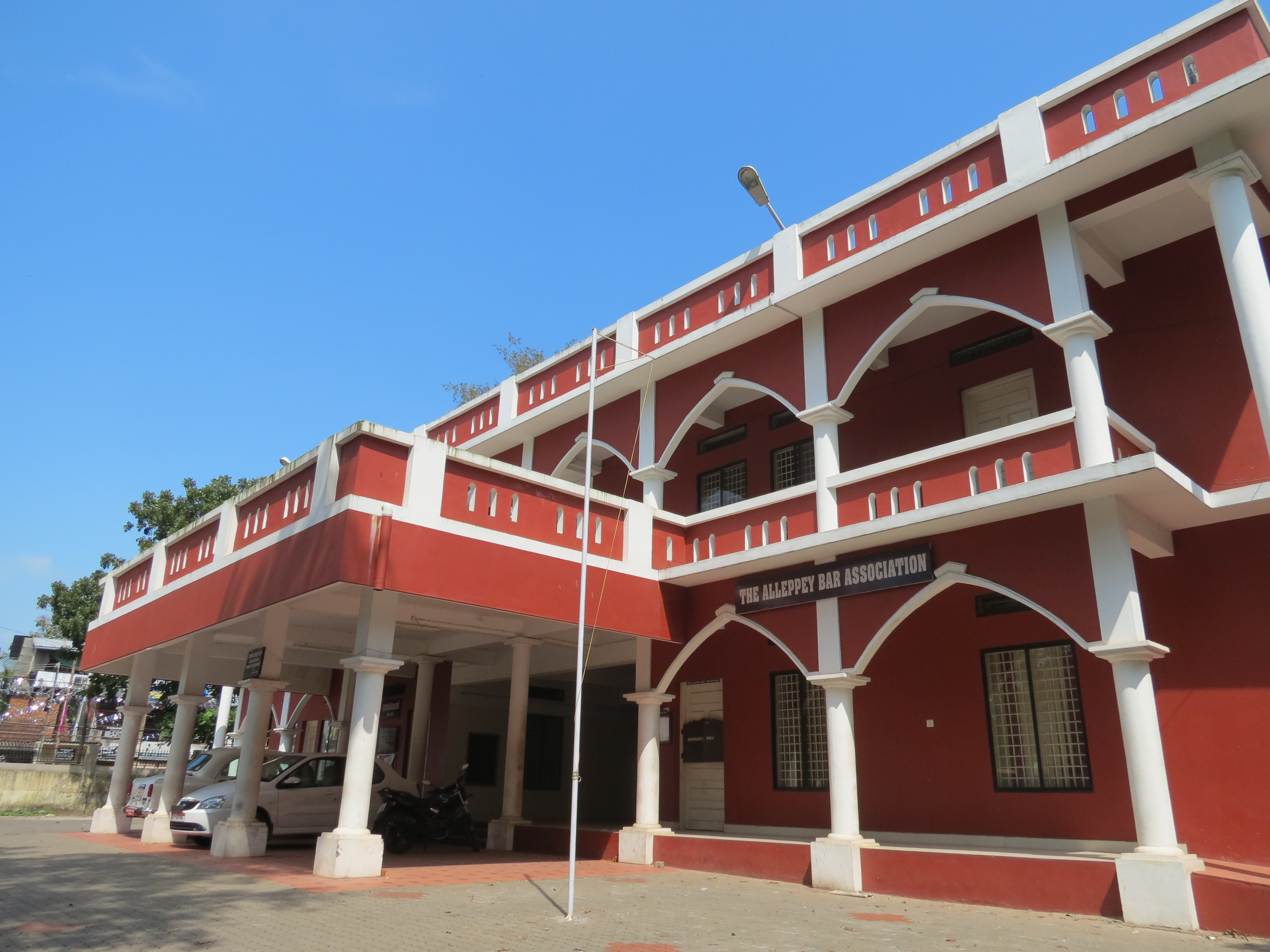
Alleppey Bar Association

The Alappuzha Municipality was constituted in 1896. It is governed according to the Kerala Municipalities Act of 1994. There are 53 wards under the Alappuzha Municipality. Molly Jacob of the Congress is the chairperson of the municipality.

The Alappuzha Municipality’s budget for the financial year of 2025-26 included ₹9.6-crore surplus Budget, with a revenue of ₹219.34 crore and an expenditure of ₹209.74 crore.

There are various national level programmes implemented in Alappuzha such as National Urban Livelihood Mission (NULM) Scheme, PMAY-U, Atal Mission for Rejuvenation and Urban Transformation (AMRUT) scheme.

The two administrative systems prevailing in the district are revenue and local self-government. Under the revenue system, the district is divided into two revenue divisions, six taluks and 91 villages. The two revenue divisions are Alappuzha division comprising Cherthala, Ambalappuzha and Kuttanad taluks consisting of 47 villages and Chengannur division comprising Karthikapally, Chengannur and Mavelikkara taluks consisting of 44 villages. For census purposes, Aroor, Arookutty, Kodamthuruth, Thanneermukkom Vadakku, Thaneermukkam Thekku, Vayalar East and Kokkothamangalam village, except the portions included in Cherthala municipality are treated in the 1981 census as census towns based on the threefold criteria adopted for treating a place as census town.

Under the local self-government system, the district is divided into five statutory towns and development blocks consisting of 71 panchayats. The jurisdiction of a Development Block includes the areas falling in census towns also.

There were nine legislative assembly segments in Alappuzha district for the 2011 Assembly elections. They are Aroor, Cherthala, Alappuzha, Kuttanad, Haripad, Kayamkulam, Mavelikkara and Chengannur.

Alappuzha assembly constituency is part of Alappuzha (Lok Sabha constituency). The other Lok Sabha constituency of the district is Mavelikkara.

Parliament representatives
Name	Lok-Sabha constituency	Year	Political party
P. K. Vasudevan Nair	Alappuzha	1962–1977	Communist Party of India (as Ambalappuzha seat)
R.Achuthan	Mavelikara	1962–1967	Indian National Congress
G.P. Mangalathumadom	Mavelikara	1967–1971	Samyukta Socialist Party
R. Balakrishna Pillai	Mavelikara	1971–1977	Kerala Congress
B.K. Nair	Mavelikara	1977–1980	Indian National Congress
Suseela Gopalan	Alappuzha	1980–1984	Communist Party of India (Marxist)
Prof. P.J. Kurien	Mavelikara	1980–1984,1989-1998	Indian National Congress
Vakkom Purushotham	Alappuzha	1984–1991	Indian National Congress
Thampan Thomas	Mavelikara	1984–1989	Janata Party
T. J. Anjalose	Alappuzha	1991–1996	Communist Party of India (Marxist)
Ramesh Chennithala	Mavelikara	1999–2004	Indian National Congress
C.S. Sujatha	Mavelikara	2004–2009	Communist Party of India (Marxist)
V.M Sudheeran	Alappuzha	1977–1980, 1996–2004	Indian National Congress
Dr. K.S Manoj	Alappuzha	2004–2009	Communist Party Of India (Marxist)
K.C Venugopal MP	Alappuzha	2009- 2014	Indian National Congress
Kodikunnil Suresh MP	Mavelikara	2009–2014	Indian National Congress
K.C Venugopal MP	Alappuzha	2009- 2014	Indian National Congress
Kodikunnil Suresh MP	Mavelikara	2009–2014	Indian National Congress
K.C Venugopal MP	Alappuzha	2014- 2019	Indian National Congress
Kodikunnil Suresh MP	Mavelikara	2014–2019	Indian National Congress
A. M. Ariff	Alappuzha	2019–2024	Communist Party of India (Marxist)
Kodikunnil Suresh MP	Mavelikara	2019–2024	Indian National Congress
K.C Venugopal MP	Alappuzha	2024-	Indian National Congress
Kodikunnil Suresh MP	Mavelikara	2024-	Indian National Congress

== Education ==
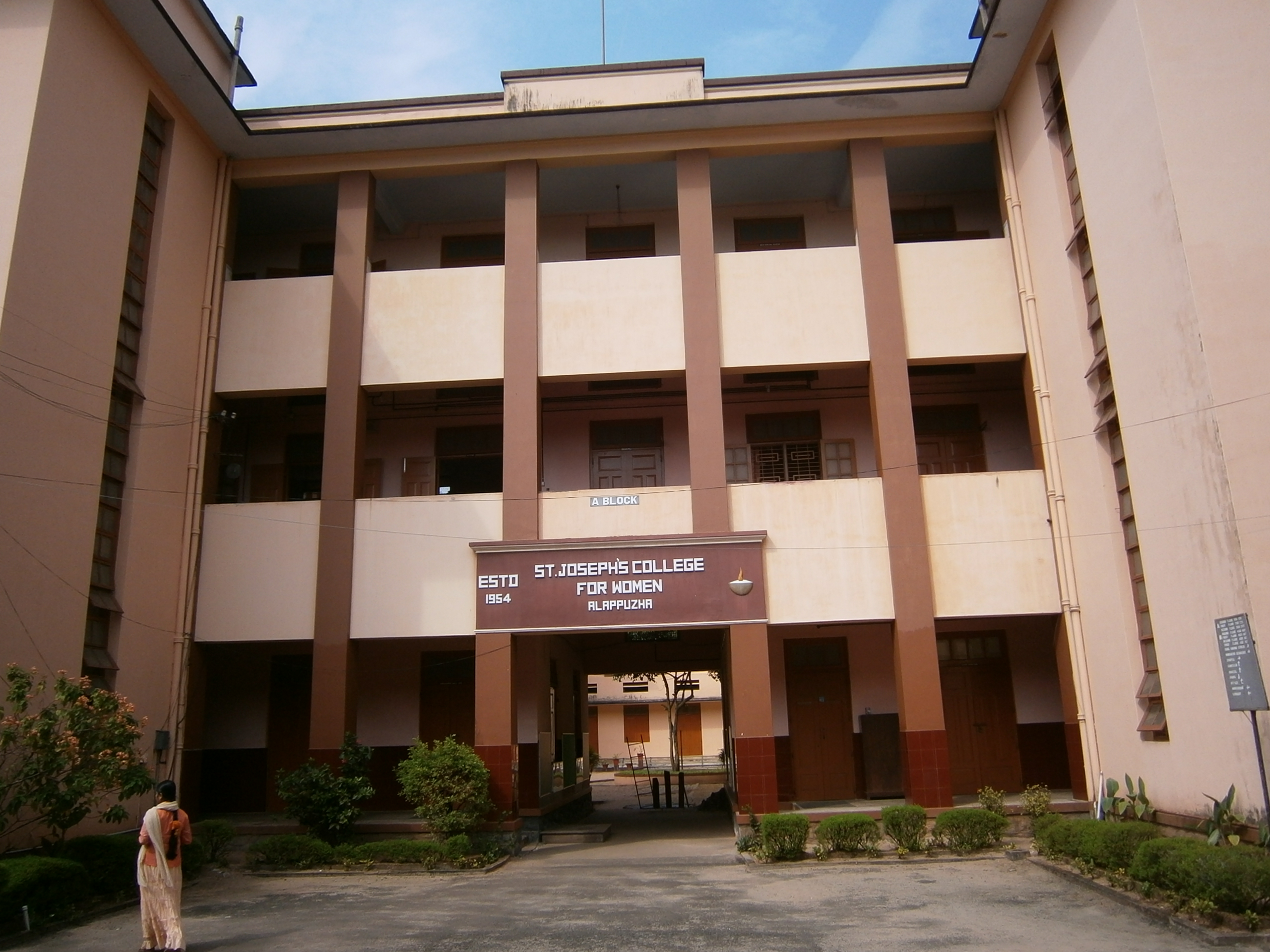
St. Joseph's College for Women, Alappuzha

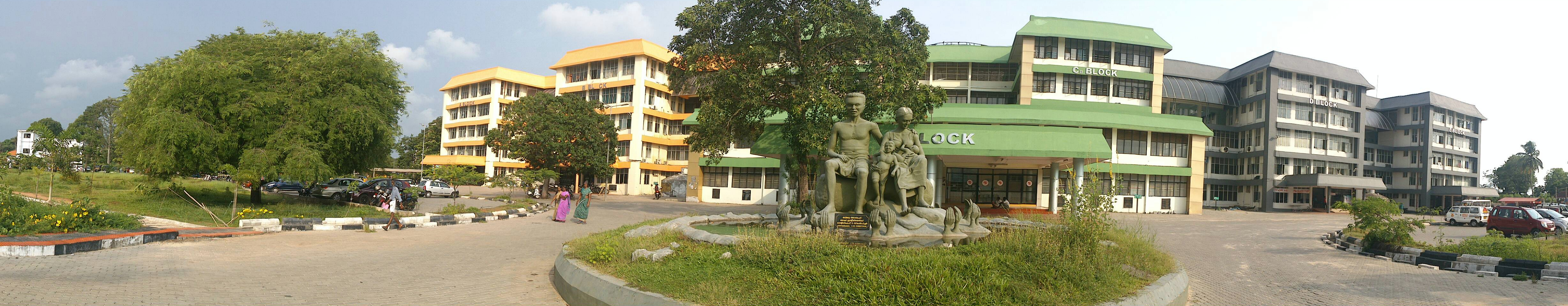
Government T. D. Medical College, Alappuzha

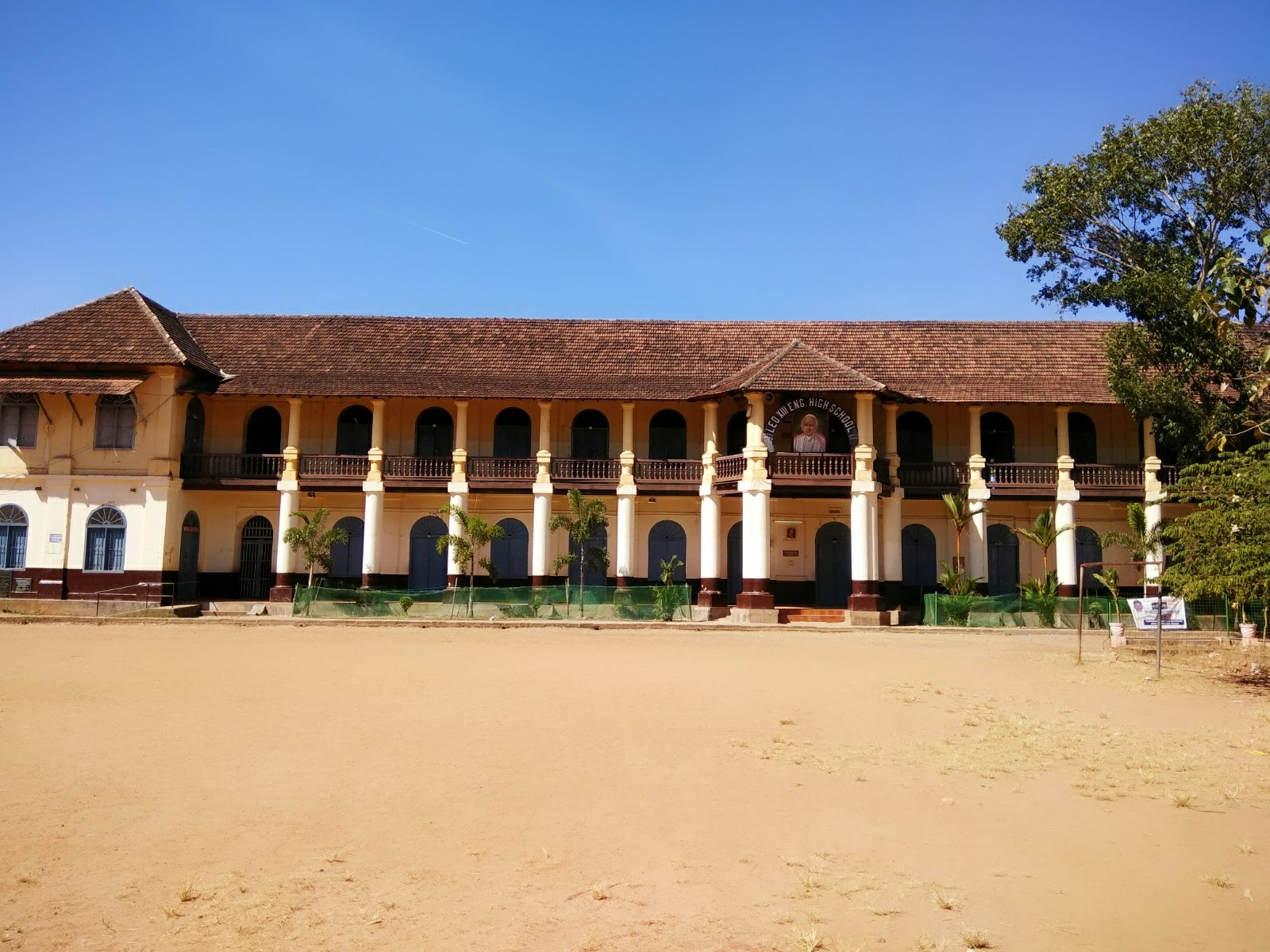
Leo XIII HSS, Alappuzha

There are schools, computer institutes and colleges all over the district, with nine training schools, 405 lower primary schools, 105 high schools and 87 higher secondary schools.

The first school in Alappuzha, the Church Missionary Society (CMS) School, was established in 1816. The school was established by the Rev. Thomas Norton, the first CMS missionary to India. The school is run by the CSI Christ Church, Alappuzha. The first higher secondary school in Alappuzha was the Leo XIIIth Higher Secondary School, which was opened on 1 June 1889 by Portuguese Bishop John Gomes Pereira of Cochin. The first polytechnic college in Alappuzha was the Carmel Polytechnic College, established by Fr. Gilbert Palaekunnel, and it is managed by the CMI Congregation. Carmel is still the academically top-ranked polytechnic in the state.

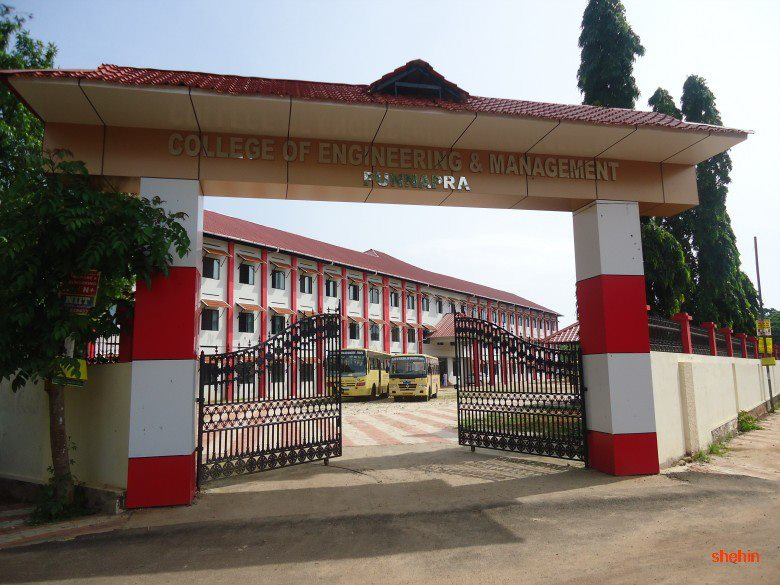
College of Engineering and Management, Punnapra

Colleges in Alappuzha offer both graduate and postgraduate courses for their students.

=== Major college institutes ===
- University Institute of Technology (UIT), Alappuzha
- College of Engineering, Cherthala
- Sanatana Dharma College
- S. D. V. College of Arts and Applied Science
- Sree Narayana College Cherthala-SN College Kanjikkuzhy
- N.S.S. College, Cherthala
- Government College, Ambalappuzha
- College of Engineering and Management, Punnapra
- Mar Gregorios College Punnapra
- College of Engineering Chengannur
- College of Applied Sciences, Mavelikkara
- Carmel College of Engineering and Technology Alappuzha
- Government T D Medical College, Alappuzha
- St Joseph's College for Women, Alappuzha
- St Michael's College, Cherthala
- T. K. Madhava Memorial College
- St. Aloysius College Edathua
- Bishop Moore College Mavelikkara
- Milad-E-Sherief Memorial College, Kayamkulam (MSM)
- Christian College, Chengannur

== Religious buildings and shrines ==
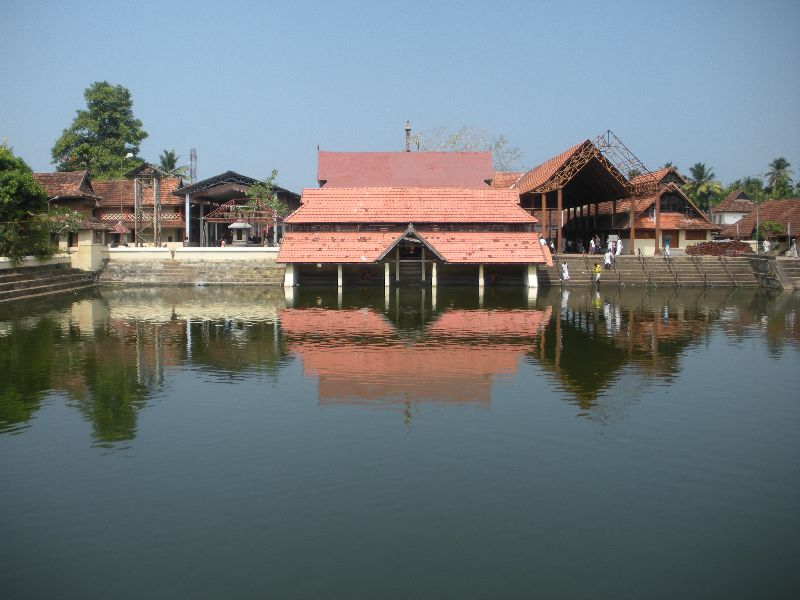
Ambalappuzha Sree Krishna Swamy Temple

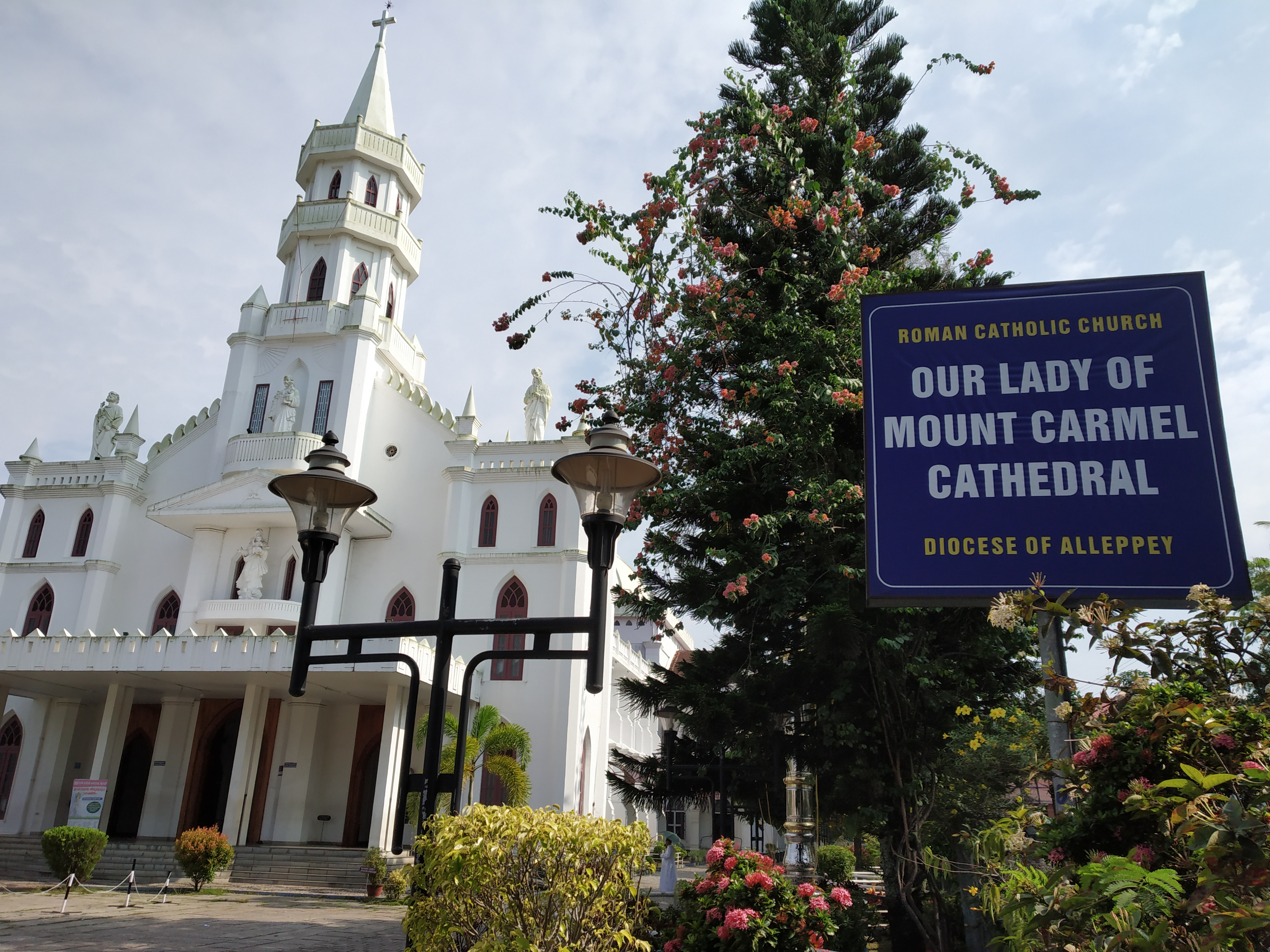
Our Lady of Mount Carmel Cathedral, Alappuzha

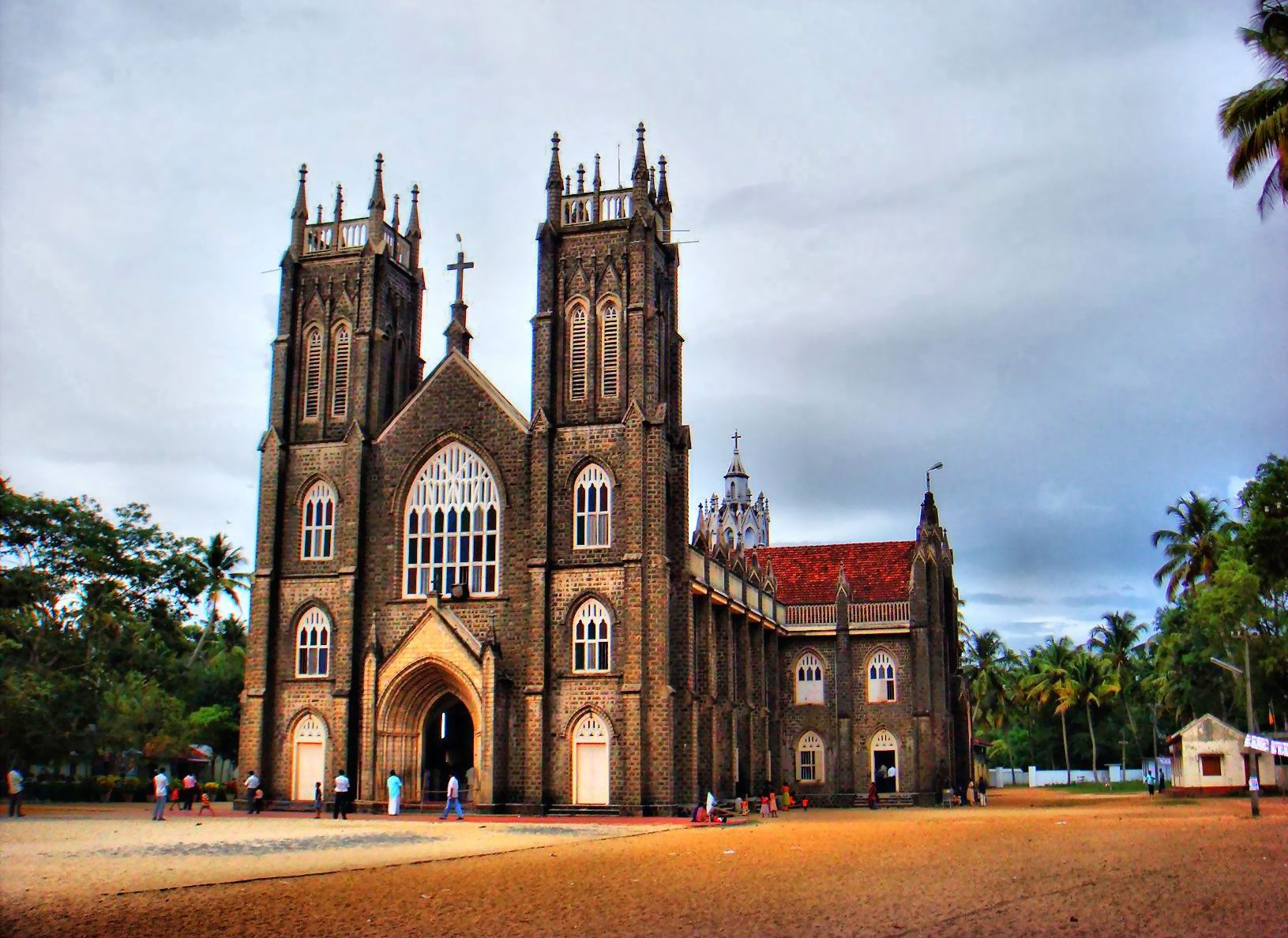
St Andrew's Basilica, Arthunkal

=== Hindu temples in Alappuzha ===
- Ambalappuzha Sree Krishna Swamy Temple
- Anandeshwaram Mahadeva Temple
- Chakkulathukavu Temple (Bhagavathy Temple)
- Chettikulangara Devi Temple
- Chengannur Mahadeva Temple
- Haripad Sree Subrahmanya Swamy Temple
- Kanichukulangara Devi Temple
- Kandiyoor Sree Mahadeva Temple, Mavelikkara
- Mannarasala Temple
- Mullakkal Rajarajeswari Temple
- Padanilam Parabrahma Temple, Nooranad
- Thripuliyoor Mahavishnu Temple
- Thrichittatt Maha Vishnu Temple
- Valiyakulangara Devi Temple, Karthikappally

=== Christian churches in Alappuzha ===
- Our Lady of Mount Carmel Cathedral, Alappuzha
- St Andrew's Basilica, Arthunkal
- St. George/Paul Forane Church
- Basilica of St Mary, Champakulam (Chambakulam kalloorkadu Basilica)
- St Thomas Church, Thumpoly (Thumpoly pally)
- St. Mary's Forane Church, Pulinkunnoo

=== Muslim mosques in Alappuzha ===
- Maqam Masjid, civil station ward, Alappuzha.
- Saukar Masjid, a mosque built in 1850.

== Sports ==
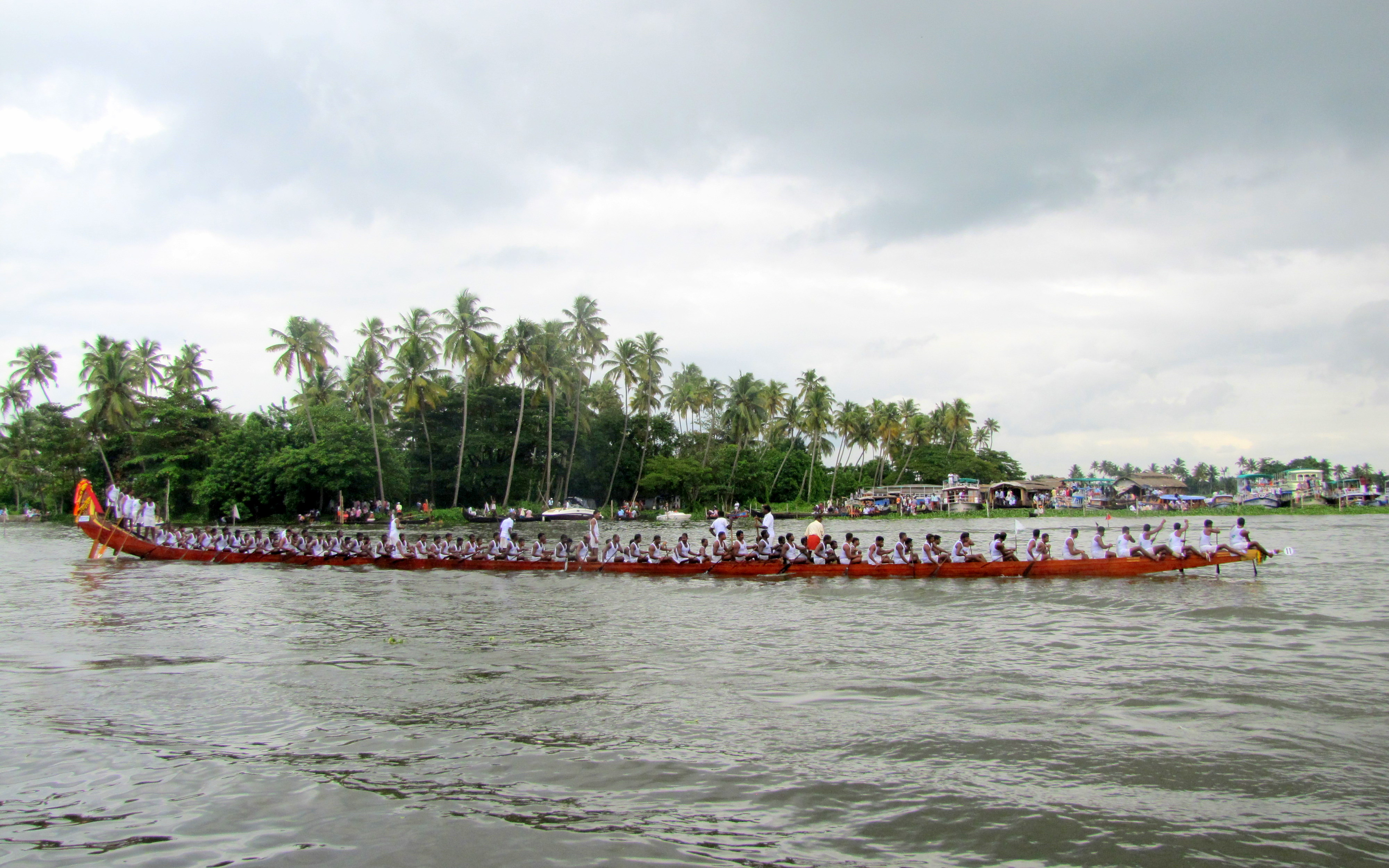
The Nehru Trophy Boat Race is a popular sport held in the Punnamada Lake near Alappuzha

Alappuzha hosts the Nehru Trophy Boat Race held in the Punnamada Lake near Alappuzha. In 1952, when Jawaharlal Nehru, the first prime minister of India, visited Kerala, the people of Alleppey decided to give a special entertainment for their prestigious guest and conducted a snake boat race. Nehru got so excited by this event and he jumped into 'Nadubhagam Chundan' (a snake boat), ignoring the security officials. By this excitement of sailing in a snake boat he donated a rolling trophy to be awarded to the winner of the race. Other than this snake boat race cricket, football, basketball and rowing are among the most popular sports in town. In 2015, the Kerala Cricket Association inaugurated the KCA Cricket Stadium Alappuzha, which is an A-class cricket stadium.

== Notable people ==
- Thakazhi Sivasankara Pillai - Novelist and short story writer, recipient of India's highest literary award, the Jnanpith.
- Vayalar Ramavarma - Malayalam poet and film lyricist
- Arattupuzha Velayudha Panicker - Social reformer in Kerala
- M. K. Sanu – writer, critic and social activist, a permanent member of the International body for Human rights
- Irayimman Thampi - Carnatic musician as well as a music composer from Kerala
- Kavalam Narayana Panicker - director, poet
- S. D. Shibulal - chief executive officer and managing director of Infosys
- Navajyothi Sree Karunakara Guru - Founder of Santhigiri Ashram
- Ganesh Puthur - Writer, Kendra Sahitya Akademi Award Winner
- P. S. Karthikeyan - Former Secretary, S. N. Trust, former Director of SNDP Yogam, former Member of the Legislative Assembly (Aroor), Chief Editor of Dinamani daily
- P. Narayana Kurup - Malayalam Poet
- Joy J. Kaimaparamban - English and Malayalam author
- Itty Achudan - the major contributor of ethno-medical information for the compilation of Hortus Malabaricus
- Eleanour Sinclair Rohde - British gardener and writer on horticulture
- V. P. Sivakumar - short story writer
- Justice C.T.Ravikumar - Supreme Court Judge.
- M. G. Sreekumar - Musician, singer and music director
- Vayalar Sarath Chandra Varma - Poet and lyricist
- Kavalam Sreekumar - Classical musician, playback singer, composer
- Rajeev Alunkal - lyricist, poet and orator

=== Religion ===
- Karunakara Guru - founder of Santhigiri Ashramam
- Palackal Thoma Malpan - founder of the Carmelites of Mary Immaculate
- Mgr. Joseph C. Panjikaran - founder of the Medical Sisters of St. Joseph
- Antony Theodore - Christian educator, poet, social worker
- Saint Kuriakose Elias Chavara - Christian saint

=== Politics ===
- A. K. Antony - three times Chief Minister of Kerala in UDF Ministry, former Indian Defence Minister
- V. S. Achuthanandan - former chief minister of Kerala and one of the most senior communist politicians of India
- Ramesh Chennithala - former Home Minister and Former Leader of the opposition of Kerala, current legislative assembly member of Haripad constituency.
- Suseela Gopalan- Former Kerala Industries Minister and Communist Leader
- K. R. Gowri - Revenue Minister in first Kerala LDF ministry, initiated the land reforms in Kerala, Agriculture minister in Kerala UDF Ministry
- Vayalar Ravi - former Home minister of Kerala in UDF Ministry, former Union Cabinet Minister of Overseas Indian Affairs and Minister for Parliamentary Affairs
- C. K. Chandrappan - communist leader and former Member of Parliament
- S. Ramachandran Pillai - Politburo member of the Communist Party of India (Marxist) and General Secretary of All India Kisan Sabha (Peasants Union)
- G. Sudhakaran - member of the Communist Party of India (Marxist) and former PWD minister of Kerala
- P. Parameswaran - Director of Bharatheeya Vichara Kendram; philosopher

=== Cinema ===
- Sreekumaran Thampi - lyricist, director, producer and screenwriter in Malayalam cinema
- Jomon T. John - Indian cinematographer
- Ratheesh - Malayalam film actor
- Kunchacko - Indian film producer and director
- Nedumudi Venu - Malayalam film actor.
- Fazil - Malayalam film director
- Kunchacko Boban - Malayalam film actor
- Riaz M T - Malayalam film actor
- Fahadh Faasil - Malayalam film actor
- Jagannatha Varma - Kathakali artist, actor in Malayalam film and serial
- Ashokan - Malayalam film actor
- Rajan P. Dev – Malayalam film actor and drama/theatre person
- S. L. Puram Sadanandan - Malayalam playwright and film scriptwriter
- Chelangatt Gopalakrishnan - writer and film critic
- Radhika (Malayalam actress) - Malayalam film actress
- Navodaya Appachan - Malayalam movie producer and businessman
- Jijo Punnoose - film director
- Padmarajan - film director
- Narendra Prasad - film actor, writer and critic
- KPAC Lalitha - Malayalam film actress
- Beeyar Prasad - Indian Malayalam lyricist and poet
- Madhu Muttom - Screenwriter of Manichitrathazhu, Kakkothikkavile Appooppan Thaadikal
- Samantha Ruth Prabhu- Actress
- Navya Nair - Actress
- MG Sreekumar - Playback Singer
- Shahi Kabir - Malayalam film director and writer

=== Sport ===
- Prasanth Parameswaran - Kerala first class cricketer (Indian Premier League and Royal Challengers Bangalore player)
- Saji Thomas - sportsman and Arjuna awardee
- K. Udayakumar - India men's national volleyball Player, Arjuna Awardee

== See also ==
- Alappuzha East
- Alappuzha West
- Alappuzha Lighthouse
- Alappuzha Beach
- Ernakulam-Kayamkulam coastal railway line
- KCA Cricket Stadium, Alappuzha
- List of people from Alappuzha
- Technical Higher Secondary School, Cherthala, Pallippuram
- Travancore Labour Association
