= Sanatan Dharma (disambiguation) =

Sanatan Dharma is a modern alternative term for Hinduism. It may also refer to:

== Places ==
- Sanatan Dharma College Ground

== Institutes ==
- Sanatan Dharma College, college in Haryana, India
- Vikramajit Singh Sanatan Dharma College, Kanpur, India
- Sanata Dharma University, university in Yogyakarta Indonesia
- Sanatan Dharma Maha Sabha, Hindu organization
