= Mannancherry =

- Village
- Location in Kerala, India Mannancherry (India)
- Coordinates: 9°34′35″N 76°20′53″E
- Country: India
- State: Kerala
- District: Alappuzha

Population (2011)
  - Total: 32,139

Languages
  - Official: Malayalam, English
- Time zone: UTC+5:30 (IST)
- PIN: 688538
- Telephone code: 0477
- Vehicle registration: KL 04
- Nearest city: Alappuzha

Mannancherry is a village in Alappuzha district in Kerala, India. It is situated about 10 km north of Alappuzha town. Vembanad Lake forms the eastern boundary of the village. In governance, Mannancherry is a Panchayat. In parliamentary representation, it is part of the Alappuzha Assembly constituency, as well as the Alappuzha LokSabha constituency. The primary occupation of the village's inhabitants has been coir-making for the past several decades.

== Location ==
Mannanchery is well connected by road. NH 47 passes through Kalavoor, which is 2 km to the west of Mannanchery. Nearest major railway station is Alappuzha, and airport is Cochin International Airport.

== Notable institutions ==
=== Education ===
- Government High School, Mannancherry
- Government Higher Secondary School, Kalavoor
- Gayathri English Medium School, Mannancherry
- Crescent Public School, Mannancherry
- Darul Huda Orphanage & English Medium School, Mannancherry
- There are other schools located at Ponnad, Kavungal, Tharamood Aryad, Thambakachuvadu

=== Health Care ===
- Government Ayurvedic Centre, Kavunkal
- PalmShade Multispeciality Hospital and ClearSky Diagnostics, Ambalakadavu
- We One Hospital, Kavunkal
- Golden Flower Medical Centre, Adivaram
- Diacare Laboratory, Mannancherry

=== Finance ===
- Federal Bank, Mannnanchery
- State Bank of India ATM & CDM, Mannancherry
- South Indian Bank, Mannancherry
- Kerala Bank, Mannancherry

=== Worship ===
- Thrikkovil Mahadevar Temple, Mannancherry
- Manakkal Sree Devi Kshethram, Kunnappalli
- Sree Poonjilikavil Devi Kshethram, Kavunkal
- Madathumkara Mahadeva Temple
- St.Mary's Church, Mannancherry
- Thafreejiyya Sunni Musjid, Mannancherry
- West Mahallu Muslim Jama'ath
- East Mahallu Muslim Jama'ath
- Salafi Juma Masjid
- Chiyamveli Irshadhul Islam Juma Masjid
- Islamic Centre Mannancherry (Samastha Zone Office)
- Naluthara Ahmmed Moulavi Memorial Islamic Centre
- Kuppezham Muhiyudheen Juma Masjid
- Sheikh Fareed Ouliya Juma Masjid, Changampodu
- Town Juma Masjid Mannancherry

== Demographics ==
As of 2011 India census, Mannanchery had a population of 32,139 with 15,599 males and 16,540 females.
