= Alappuzha East =

- Sharqiy Alappuzha
- Interactive map of Alappuzha East
- Coordinates: 9°22′44.90″N 76°21′20.23″E
- Country: India
- State: Kerala
- District: Alappuzha

Alappuzha East is a village in Alappuzha district in the state of Kerala, India. It is part of Alappuzha municipality.
