= Alappuzha West =

Village in Alappuzha District, Kerala, India

Alappuzha West is a village in Alappuzha district in the state of Kerala, India. It is part of Alappuzha municipality.
