= Onnum Onnum Moonu (film) =

2015 Indian film

- Theatrical poster
- Directed by: Abhilash; Bijoy Joseph; VS Sreekanth
- Written by: Fais Umer
- Produced by: White Dot Movies
- Starring: M. R. Gopakumar; Kalabhavan Mani; Arun; Boban Alummoodan; Leona Lishoy
- Cinematography: Santhosh K Lal
- Edited by: Abi Chander G, Prem Krishnan
- Music by: MS Sheikh Ilahi; Muralee Krishna; Shibu Joseph
- Production company: Chitranjali Studio
- Distributed by: White Dot Movies
- Release date: 8 September 2015
- Running time: 103 Minutes
- Country: India
- Language: Malayalam

Onnum Onnum Moonu (ഒന്നും ഒന്നും മൂന്ന്, English: One Plus One equals Three) is a 2015 Indian Malayalam comedy drama anthology film which will have three films in it, namely Kulukki Sarbath, Sabdarekha and Devi. It stars Kalabhavan Mani, M. R. Gopakumar, Arun, Boban Alummoodan, Sathaar, Riaz M T, Irshad and Leona Lishoy in the lead roles. Its music was composed by MS Sheikh Ilahi, Muralee Krishna and Shibu Joseph with lyrics written by Philipose Thathampally and Santhosh Kodanadu. The film was released on 8 September 2015.

== List of short films ==
Short film	Director	Cinematographer	Writer	Actors
Sabdarekaha	Abhilash	Santhosh K Lal	Aravind G Menon	Arun, Irshad, Sathaar, Sandeep, Leona Lishoy
Devi	Sreekanth VS	Madhu Pillai	Fais Umer	M. R. Gopakumar, Lakshmu Sanal, Baby
Kulukki sarbath	Bijoy Joseph	Santhosh K Lal	Bijoy Joseph	Riaz M T, Ameer Niyaz, Ahishek, Surya Sankar, Treesa

== Cast ==
- Kalabhavan Mani
- Arun
- M. R. Gopakumar
- Boban Alummoodan
- Sathaar
- Riaz M T
- Indrans
- Irshad
- Leona Lishoy
- Ameer Niyas
- Riya Saira
- Kalashala Babu
- Lakshmi Sanal
- Surya Sankar
- Devasurya

== Soundtrack ==
The original music and background score of the film, are composed, arranged, programmed and produced by MS Sheikh Ilahi, Muralee Krishna and Shibu Joseph with lyrics written by Philipose Thathampally and Santhosh Kodanadu.

No.	Title	Performer(s)	Length
1.	"Ilamkaat Kaathil"	Sinoj, Varsha Vikram
2.	"Rakenthu Moolunnatho"	Vijay Yesudas
