= Pallathuruthy =

- village
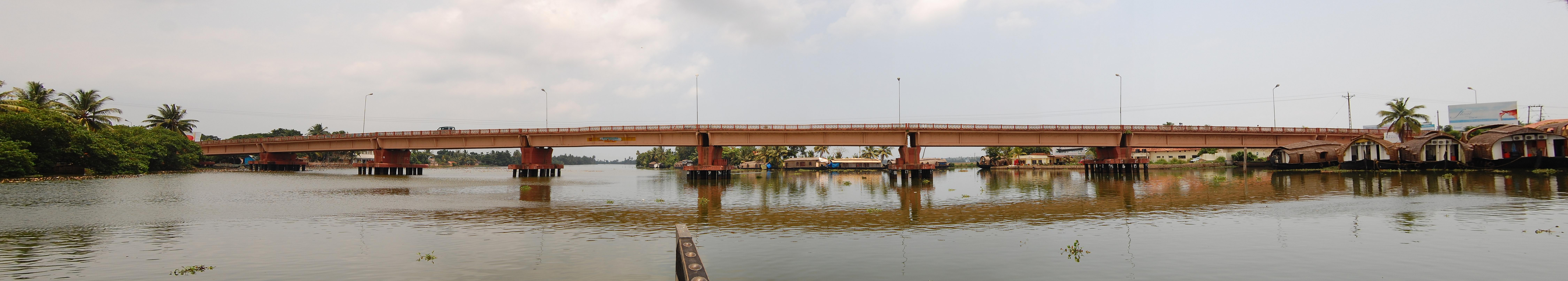
- Pallathuruthy bridge
- Interactive map of Pallathuruthy
- Coordinates: 9.4598°N 76.3697°E
- Country: India
- State: Kerala
- District: Alappuzha

Languages
  - Official: Malayalam, English
- Time zone: UTC+5:30 (IST)

Pallathuruthy is a village in the Kuttanad region, in the district of Alappuzha, in the state of Kerala, India.

== Geography ==
Pallathuruthy is a water bound region surrounded by the Vembanad lake. Also, the Pallathuruthy Canal passes through the region. Like much of the rest of Kuttanad, most of the land in Pallathuruthy is used for paddy cultivation.

== Tourism ==
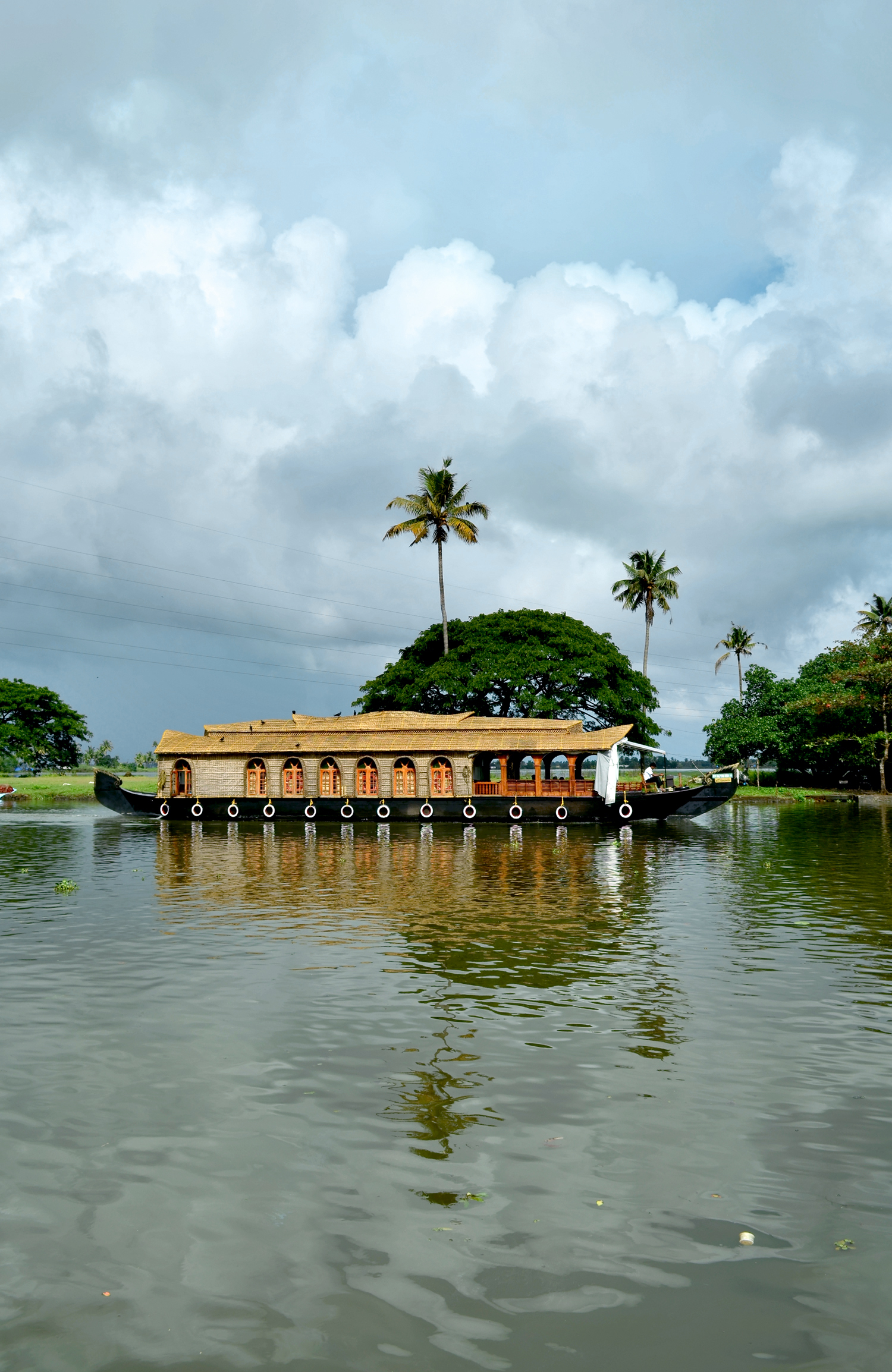
A house boat, Vembanad Lake, Kerala, India

Pallathuruthy is also a hub for many houseboat operators. The income from houseboats for tourists have helped the village economy.
