= Sanatana Dharma College Ground =

Cricket stadium in Alappuzha, Kerala, India

- Interactive map of Sanatana Dharma College Ground
- Location: Sanatana Dharma College, Alappuzha, Kerala
- Country: India
- Establishment: 6 June 2015
- Owner: Kerala Cricket Association

Sanatana Dharma College Ground is an A-class cricket stadium built by Kerala Cricket Association located at Sanatana Dharma College in the city of Alappuzha, Kerala. The stadium was inaugurated on 6 June 2015.

== Infrastructure ==
The ground has five turf wickets. 75 yards is the distance from wicket to either side of the ground. Stadium consist of player's pavilion, a complex for women players and an indoor facility. Outside the ground there are three turf wickets, an astro turf wicket and four concrete wickets for practice. A gymnasium and a shuttle badminton court have also been set up.

== Project Details ==
Kerala Cricket Association spent a sum of Rs. 3.5 crore for the construction of a modern ground. The college ground had been handed over free of cost to the Kerala Cricket Association. The association will retain possession for a period of 15 years as per a memorandum of understanding (MoU) signed between the Kerala Cricket Association and the college management.

== See also ==
- Alappuzha
- Sports in Kerala
- Kerala Cricket Association
- Sanatana Dharma College
