= Eleanour Sinclair Rohde =

British horticulturalist and author

- Eleanour Sinclair Rohde
- Born: Eleanour Sophie Sinclair Rohde; 9 August 1881; Alleppey, Travancore, India
- Died: 1950 (aged 68)
- Education: Cheltenham Ladies College; St Hilda's College, Oxford
- Occupations: Gardener, garden designer, horticultural writer
- Known for: The Scented Garden

Eleanour Sophie Sinclair Rohde (1881–1950) was a British gardener, garden designer, and horticultural writer. She authored thirty books on gardening between 1913 and 1948, and is best known for her book, The Scented Garden, published in 1931.

== Biography ==
Eleanor Sophie Sinclair Rohde was born in Alleppey, Travancore, India, on 9 August 1881. She was the daughter of John Rohde, a civil servant in India, and his wife, Isabel Crawford. She was educated at Cheltenham Ladies College and St Hilda's College, Oxford. After Oxford, she began her writing career with articles on gardening in magazines, including The Field, The Queen, The Cornhill Magazine and The Garden.

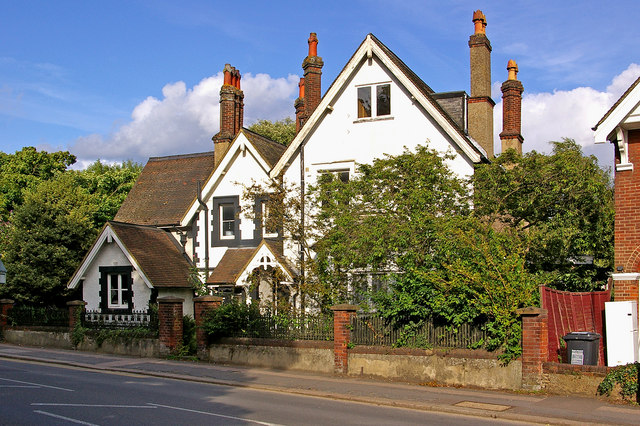
Cranham Lodge, Eleanour Rohde house from 1900 to 1950

During her long career, Rhode authored thirty publications on gardening and gardening history. For much of her life, she lived at Cranham Lodge, in Reigate, Surrey. Rohde grew and collected uncommon herb and vegetable varieties in her large garden.

Rohde also worked as a garden designer. One of the most visited gardens that she designed was the herb garden for Lullingstone Castle in west Kent, England. Her work did much to encourage the modern popularity of herb gardens. The work that she is most known for is The Scented Garden, published in 1931. Her other popular books include, A Garden of Herbs (1921), Rose Recipes from Olden Times (1939), and The Wartime Vegetable Garden. The Wartime Vegetable Garden was published in 1940 to promote increased food production by the general public during World War II.

In her personal life, Rohde was shy, solitary and a strict vegetarian.

== Selected publications ==
- 1921: A Garden of Herbs
- 1922: The Old English Herbals
- 1924: The Old English Gardening Books
- 1925: The Old-World Pleasaunce: An Anthology, of extracts in prose and verse relating to gardening
- 1929: A Chaplet of Flowers: An Anthology
- 1931: The Scented Garden
- 1938: Vegetable: Cultivation and Cookery
- 1939: Rose Recipes, Routledge
- 1940: Culinary and Salad Herbs: their cultivation and food values
- 1940: The Wartime Vegetable Garden, Medici Society (reprinted 1941, twice, & 1942)
- 1943: Uncommon Vegetables, London: Country Life (1943)
