= Joy J. Kaimaparamban =

Indian writer

- Born: 11 October 1939 (age 86)
- Occupation: Writer
- Writing career
- Years active: 1954 – present
- Notable works: The Ayurvedic Healer, The Azure of Solicitude
- Notable awards: Tagore Award, Kunkumam Prize
- Website: web.archive.org/web/20100512114615/http://kaimaparamban.com/

Joy J. Kaimaparamban (Jōyi Je Kayimāparampan) (born 11 October 1939) is an Indian novelist writing mainly in Malayalam. Born to a middle-class family of Kerala, India, Kaimaparamban became an English teacher and served in many schools in Kerala. He started his literary career at a young age and is still writing. He now lives in Vayalar, a small village in Alappuzha (Alleppey) district with his wife and two children. He has written several novels, some plays, and more than 100 short stories in his mother tongue, Malayalam. All of them were published through DC Books and SPCS, Kottayam. All India Radio has broadcast several of his short stories and dramas. He won an award in the name of Rabindranath Tagore, established by DC Books Kottayam in 1977, for his first novel Urayoorunna Pakalukal, and won the Kunkumam Prize in 1990, for his novel Theerabhoomikal. The Azure of Solicitude was his first novel in English, published by America print on demand publisher PublishAmerica September 2009. The Ayurvedic Healer is his second novel in English published by Copperhill Media Corporation. The Snake Charmer and the King Cobra is a collection of 30 short stories, published by Copperhill Media Corporation in 2013.

== Books published in Malayalam ==
- Urayoorunna Pakalukal (The Slough Shedding Days) [1977, 1980, 1995]
- Ekanthatheeram (The Shore of Loneliness) [1977, 1999]
- Vazhiyariyathavar (Persons unaware of Path) [1977]
- Aswastha Sandhyakal (The unpleasant Dooms) [1978]
- Unmada Nimishangal (Moments of Hallucination) [1979]
- Dukham Thedunnavar(Seekers of Sadness) [1979]
- Manassile Nizhalukal (Shadows in the Mind) [1981]
- Thirichuvannavar (The Returnees) [1982]
- Puramthodukal (The Shells) [1984]
- Valayangal (The Circles) [1985]
- Vanantharngal (The Inner Forests) [1987]
- Theerabhoomikal (The Coastal Lands) [1990]
- Valmeekam (The Termitary) [1995]
- Saagarageethangal (Ballads of the Sea) [1999]

=== Children's literature ===
- Pathinonnu Bala Kathakal (11 Stories for Children) [1979]
- Sanchi Manushyan (The Bag Man) [1982, 2012]
- Parakkunna Paava (The Flying Doll) [1994]
- Bodhi: (The Enlightenment) [1994]

=== English ===
- The Snake Charmer and the King Cobra [2013]
- The Seagulls [2013]
- The Ayurvedic Healer [2010]
- The Azure of Solicitude [2009]
