= Riaz M. T. =

Indian actor, story writer, and lyricist

- Born: 6 May 1973 (age 53); Alappuzha, Kerala, India
- Occupations: Film actor; story writer; social worker; human rights worker
- Years active: 2013–present
- Website: www.riazmt.com

Riaz Pathan (born 6 May 1973), credited mononymously as Riaz M T, is an Indian actor, story writer, lyricist, and businessman who predominantly works in Malayalam cinema, with notable appearances in Kannada films as well. In a career spanning over a decade, Riaz has acted in several films and received acclaim for his performances, including the prestigious Adoor Bhasi Best Actor Award in 2014. Known for his unique style and character-driven roles, Riaz has carved a niche for himself in regional cinema.

Born in Alappuzha, Kerala, to P. V. Thajudeen and Nazeema H. B., Riaz completed his early education at Polabhagam J. B. School and pursued his high school studies at S. D. V. Boys High School, Alappuzha. He went on to complete his pre-degree and degree at S. D. College, Alappuzha.

Riaz made his acting debut with the Malayalam film Flat No. 4B (2013), directed by Krishnjith S. Vijayan, where he played the lead role. His performance in the film earned him the Adoor Bhasi Best Actor Award in 2014, establishing him as a promising actor in the Malayalam film industry. He later expanded his acting career into Kannada cinema with the 2020 film Gadiyara, directed by Prabhiq Mogavear.

Over the years, Riaz has contributed to a variety of Malayalam films including Onnum Onnum Moonu, Dust Bin, Deadline, Mughapadangal, Clint, Kayamkulam Kochunni, and Rani, showcasing his versatility as an actor and storyteller. In addition to his artistic pursuits, Riaz is also involved in business, balancing his entrepreneurial ventures with his passion for cinema.

== Early life ==
Riaz M T was born on 6 May 1973 in Alappuzha, Kerala, to P. V. Thajudeen and Nazeema H. B. He began his education at Polabhagam J. B. School, located west of Mannath Junction in Poonthopu Ward, Alappuzha. He later attended S. D. V. Boys High School, Alappuzha, for his secondary education. Following high school, he completed his pre-degree and undergraduate studies at S. D. College, Alappuzha.

== Career ==
=== Malayalam cinema ===
Riaz made his debut in Krishnjith S Vijayan's [Flat No.4B] in 2012.

Riaz's Second Movie released was Onnum Onnum Moonu, released in 2015.

== Filmography ==
=== As actor ===
Year	Film	Role	Director	Language
2013	Flat No.4B	Reghu	Krishnajith S Vijayan	Malayalam
2014	Onnum onnum moonu	Alexander	Adbilash	Malayalam
2017	Eliyamma Chedathiyude Adyathe Christmas	No Name	Benny Ashamsa	Malayalam
2017	Clint	Hero Friend	Harikumar	Malayalam
2018	Dust Bin	Jeeva	Madhu Thathampally	Malayalam
2018	Kayamkulam Kochunni	Bhrahmin	Roshan Andrews	Malayalam
2020	Gadiyara	Police Officer	Prabhik Mughaveer	Kannada
2021	Randam Pakuthi	Alex	Krishnajith S Vijayan	Malayalam
2021	Karuvu	Saithali	Sreeshma	Malayalam
2021	Dravida Rajakumaran	Baskaran	Sajeev Kilikulam	Malayalam
2023	Rani	Karyasthan	Nizamudheen Nazar	Malayalam
2025	Sathaan †	Tony	Krishnajith S Vijayan	Malayalam

=== As a story writer ===
No.	Year	Film	Language	Participation
1	2013	Flat No.4B (film)	Malayalam	Screenwriter
2	2019	Baluvinte Itheehyam (film)	Malayalam	Story & Script
3	2021	Pampadum Cholai (film)	Tamil	Story & Script

=== As a director ===
No.	Year	Film	Language
1	2019	The Deaf (film)	No Language - No Human Voice
2	2019	Baluvinte Ithihyam (film)	Malayalam

=== As a lyricist ===
Riaz M T debuted as a Lyricist in Flat No.4B (2013) by writing the song of the film, "Iniyumeerananiyumo".

No.	Year	Song	Film	Singer	Language	Music	Notes
1	2013	"Iniyumeeraniyumo"	Flat No.4B	G Venugopal	Malayalam	Nikhil Prabha	Featured in the title credits of the film
2	2013	"Arike O ennarike"	Flat No.4B	Remya Swaminathan	Malayalam	Nikhil Prabha	Featured in the title credits of the film

=== UAE National Day Album 2018 ===
Riaz M T done a main role in UAE National Day Album 2018

No.	Year	Song	Director	Music director	Singer	Language	Notes
1	2018	"UAE National Day Album 2018"	Ajmal	Eldho Mathew	Sulfi	Arabic	UAE National Day 2018 Album – 100 years of Shake Zayed

=== As a model ===
No.	Year	Company
1	2017	Sharekhan
