= Kokkothamangalam =

Kokkothamangalam Kokkamangalam
- Town
- Location in Kerala, India
- Coordinates: 9.67884°N 76.362099°E
- Country: India
- State: Kerala
- District: Alappuzha

Government
  - Body: Panchayat

Population (2001)
  - Total: 16,852

Languages
  - Official: Malayalam, English
- Time zone: UTC+5:30 (IST)
- Vehicle registration: KL-32 [Cherthala]
- Lok Sabha constituency: Alappuzha
- Vidhan Sabha constituency: Cherthala, Mararikulam

Kokkothamangalam is a census town in Alappuzha district in the Indian state of Kerala.

== Demographics ==
As of 2001 India census, Kokkothamangalam had a population of 16,853. Males constitute 49% of the population and females 51%. Kokkothamangalam has an average literacy rate of 85%, higher than the national average of 59.5%: male literacy is 88%, and female literacy is 82%. In Kokkothamangalam, 10% of the population is under 6 years of age.

Year	Male	Female	Total Population	Change	Religion (%)							
Year	Male	Female	Total Population	Change	Hindu	Muslim	Christian	Sikhs	Buddhist	Jain	Other religions and persuasions	Religion not stated
2001	8224	8629	16853	-	77.18	0.40	22.42	0.00	0.00	0.00	0.00	0.00
2011	8344	8703	17047	1.15%	76.72	0.21	22.38	0.02	0.01	0.00	0.00	0.66

Certain part of this village comes under the Cherthala and the rest under Mararikulam in the Kerala Assembly constituency partition.
