= Pallithode =

- Village
- Location within Kerala Location within India
- Coordinates: 9.778352°N 76.280782°E
- Country: India
- State: Kerala
- District: Alappuzha
- Taluka: Chertala
- Gram Panchayat: Kuthiathode
- Time zone: UTC+05:30 (IST)
  - Summer (DST): UTC+06:30
- Postal code: 688584

Pallithode is a village in the Alappuzha district, in the state of Kerala, India, on the shores of the Arabian Sea at the west and Backwaters in the east. Pallithode comes under the Gram Panchayats of Kuthiathode and Thuravoor, Pattanakad Block, of Cherthala Taluk. During the 20th century, more than half of its width was eroded away by the action of river backwaters and the sea. The village is very densely populated and has a wet, maritime tropical climate. Majority of the population depends on fishing industry for their livelihood.

== History ==
In ancient times, Pallithode was a border post marking the northern border of the Kingdom of Travancore (16th century to 1947), adjacent to Chellanam, a southern border post of the Kingdom of Cochin (Kochi) (12th century to 1947) and which now marks the southern border of Ernakulam district. The border posts demarcated the kingdom boundaries and controlled trade between the kingdoms, (Note: The borderstones called “KothiKallu” (because “Thi” and “Ko” were written on their sides) are seen along Pallithode Chellanam borders.) which competed with each other for dominance and territory by means of war and diplomacy. Pallithode, as a border village, felt these struggles more intensely.

The arrival of foreign traders, starting with the Portuguese in 1498, followed by the Dutch, and then the British, made the situation more complex. The kingdoms received military aid from the foreigners to fight one another, and ended up being ruled by them, finally as princely states under the British. Under British administration, trade restrictions continued, and the border checkpoints were maintained for collection of trade taxes, part of which went to British coffers.

Stability was finally achieved—with the independence of India in 1947, and with the formation of the State of Travancore-Cochin (Thiru-Kochi) in 1949—by the merger of these two princely states of British India. Pallithode became a village of Alappuzha district bordering Ernakulam district. (Note: The State of Kerala was formed in 1956 by the merger of the state of Travancore Cochin with the Malabar District of Madras State during that reorganization of Indian states.)

== Geography ==
Pallithode is a green, palm-fringed, scenic village in the coastal region of Kerala, on a narrow strip of land, with white, sandy beaches bordering the Arabian Sea to the west, and a lake (kayal)—the Pallithode Pozhi, a part of the Cochin estuary—to the east, as well as extensive, interconnected paddy fields and backwaters to the east of the Pozhi. In the old days the only access to Pallithode was by water but this has changed today with modern roads, bridges and State Highway 66 (Kerala) (SH66) passing through Pallithode. Chappakadavu beach, in South Pallithode, provides local fishing boats access to the sea. Chellanam is to the north; Valiathode, Parayakad, Chavadi, and Thuravoor are to the east; Andhakaranazhy (4 kilometres (2.5 mi) west of National Highway 66 at Pattanakad), Manokkam, Azheekal to the south.

The coastal land masses are formed or modified both by action of the sea currents and tides, and by the rainwater flow through the estuaries, from the rivers and backwater systems, supplying sediments. Deposition or erosion of coastal areas are common and dynamic. Sea erosion claims land in some areas with the eroded soil being deposited in other areas. Severe floods and tidal changes have caused more abrupt and drastic transformations at times. The Cochin estuary itself is said to have resulted from the floods of 1341, which caused the silting up of the ancient harbor of Muziris and the opening of the channel at Cochin Azhi.

Chellanam, on Pallithode's northern border, extends from Kattiparambu (near Thoppumpady) in the north to St. George's Church at the Pallithode border, where a channel known as Andhakaranazhy once passed through to the sea at the church's current location. The channel connected Pallithode Pozhi to the sea. This channel closed later naturally and reformed at a more southern location and came to be known as the present Andhakaranazhy. Although Pallithode Pozhi is no longer an estuary, but a kayal, or lake, no longer connected directly to the sea except by canals, the name remains. (Note: There is a spot at the old location known as Azhikkal as a remainder of the past. Azhikkal means by the Azhi.).

Recent sea erosion has caused loss of more than half the width of the village in the 20th century. This recent erosion, in many geological analyses, is considered to be an indirect result of the man-made development of the Cochin estuary into Cochin harbor. Sea erosion has been controlled for the last three decades by seawalls. The price paid is the loss of the once long and beautiful white sandy beaches, except in a few areas left free of seawalls. Mechanized gates, where the backwaters flow into the Arabian Sea, regulate the flow of seawater entering the paddy fields of Pallithode, Thuravoor, Pattanakad, and Ezhupunna, and they also prevent flooding of paddy fields during heavy rainfalls.

== Climate ==
Pallithode's has a wet and maritime tropical climate, classified as a tropical monsoon climate under the Köppen climate classification. Temperatures differ through the year, with average maximum highs between 24 °C (75 °F) and 36 °C (97 °F).

== Demographics ==
The population is mainly Latin Christian with a minority of Hindus. St.Sebastian’s Catholic Church in Pallithode is built in Portuguese architectural style and dates from 1880. The nearest major Hindu temple is the ancient Thuravoor Mahakshetram.

The local employment is mainly in the fishing industry or agriculture.

== Government ==
Pallithode is in the Kerala Legislative Assembly constituency of Aroor and the Indian Parliamentary constituency of Alappuzha. (Note: Census villages are more numerous and heterogenous than political units (gram panchayats).)

== Transportation ==
=== Roads ===
Pallithode village is connected to the nearest towns by NH-47, Thuravoor-Ezhupunna Road, and the Pallithode-Chellanam-Kochi Beach Road (State Highway 66 (Kerala)). The Kerala State Road Transport Corporation (KSRTC), and a number of private bus operators, provide bus service connecting the village to Ernakulam and Alappuzha.

=== Rail ===
The Alapuzha-Ernakulam Railway has a crossing station at Thuravoor providing access to the national railways. The Ernakulam-Kayamkulam coastal railway line connects to the national railways at Kayamkulam Junction railway station.

=== Inland waterways ===
Inland waterway canals and backwaters with chains of lakes connect Pallithode with Kochi in the north and Alappuzha (Alleppey) in the south through National Waterway 3. A canal links Pallithode Pozhi to Chappakadvu.

== Economy ==
Pallithode is a densely populated village with important fishing and tourism industries.

=== Fisheries ===
The Kerala state government has designated Pallithode as a fishing village for development and has allocated funds. The Manakkodam minor fishing harbor is projected for up-gradation. Chappakadavu in Pallithode is among the major fish landings on the Kerala coast. The Central Marine Fisheries Research Institute (CMFRI), the Central Institute of Fisheries Technology (CIFT), and the Fisheries ministry of Kerala use Pallithode as a field station for research and development of fisheries projects. Pallithode is also a model village in the pilot project of rainwater harvesting sponsored by the Center for Science and Environment to supplement sources of drinking water.

=== Tourism ===
Tourism is a fast developing industry of increasing importance in the Kerala economy. Pallithode with its indisputable scenic beauty is playing its part in the tourism industry. There are cruises on offer in Pallithode Pozhi and surrounds, including excursions to Andhakaranazhy. The sandy beaches are attractive to visitors. Resorts in the backwaters of Pallithode cater to Indian and international tourists. The Kerala government has developed infrastructure at Andhakaranazhy and its beaches to cater to tourists. Ecotourism is being promoted by the Kerala State Tourism Department and nongovernmental agencies. Kumbalangi, the first model tourism village in India, is close by. Help and guidance in setting up ecotourism ventures is provided by tourism offices. It's common to have visitors housed with local families, to gain insights into local culture and lifestyle. Apart from local excursions and cultural events, this may include agricultural or fish farm activities. NGO’s, including Women’s Initiative groups (WIN Society), and Farmer’s Co-operatives, give assistance and financial support in setting up homestays and associated activities.

== Places of interest ==
=== Pallithode Pozhi ===
The Pallithode Pozhi is a backwater lake that is situated very close to the sea, less than two to three hundred meters in many spots. Its network of canals connects it to the Arabian Sea at Andhakaranazhy, as well as to the Kerala backwaters system, and by the Kuthiathode Canal to Vembanad Kayal. The Pozhi, lined with Chinese fishing nets (cheenavala), and the neighboring paddy fields are important sources of freshwater fish, as well as a scenic lake important to tourism.

The action of the sea and backwaters have caused changes in geography through the ages, changes in the nature and location of the sea outlets of the backwater system in the remote past, and the loss of land mass due to sea erosion in the more recent times.

=== Andhakaranazhy ===
Andhakaranazhy means "Azhi of darkness". (Note: Azhi means a bar, a sand bar in this context. It can also mean "sea" or "deep".) It is a part of the Kerala backwater system at the Arabian Sea. There are sandy beaches at Andhakaranazhy. The area has been developed by the Kerala Tourism Development Corporation into a tourist spot. There are Restaurants and an aerial walkway. It is a natural harbor rated as a minor port by the Central Port Authority. The Kerala government, the Indian Ports Association, and the Inland Waterways Authority of India are planning its development jointly.

Manakkodam fishing harbor, with its lighthouse, is at Andhakaranazhy, and is designated as a minor port and a green field site.

=== Chappakadavu ===
Chappakadavu (Note: Kadavu means a landing place.) is the mainstay of the fishing industry in the area. Earlier it was a unique place close to the sea, with a canal having quick and easy access to the backwater system and thence to the consumers. Now transport is mainly overland, but the prominence of this fish processing area and market continues. The provision of the fishing gap has helped to retain the importance of Chappakadavu.
