= Parayakad, Alappuzha =

Parayakad, Alappuzha is a village in Kuthiathode gram panchayat, India. (Note: politically organised local administrative units.) in Cherthala Taluk in Alappuzha district in the Indian state of Kerala. There is another place known as Parayakad or Parayad in Ernakulum District. This is a small area / block (muri (Note: Means piece, fragment, slice, in Malayalam.)) in Chittattukara Village in North Paravoor. Parayakad Village (Note: Census villages are more numerous and heterogenous than political units (gram panchayats).) in Alleppey district is listed in the Central Government Indian Village Directory. Kuthiathode comes under the Pattanakad Block in Aroor Assembly constituency.

== History ==
The name Parayakad comes from the Parayakattil Kalari which existed in this area. A martial arts specialist known as Kunjan Parayakattil, originally from North Kerala and a fugitive from the ire of his local ruler, settled and started a Kalari, teaching the ancient Indian martial art of Kalaripayattu in this area. People came from the local area and traveled long distances to acquire training to develop advanced skills. The kalari also used to treat injuries and general ailments, but specializing in muscle and bone tissue. In time the area came to be known as Parayakad. The Parayakattil Kalari is no longer in existence. Nalukulanagara, Tirumalabhagom and Thuravoor North are the local areas adjacent to Parayakad.

== Demographics ==
Parayakad has a local post office and the postal code is 688540. There is a Government Lower Primary School in Parayakad. The population consists mainly of Hindus and a minority of Christians and Muslims. The presiding deity at Nalukulangara Temple is Bhagavathy. St.Sebastians Catholic Church in Parayakad comes under Alappuzha diocese.

== Geography ==
The village is connected to the nearest towns by NH-47, Thuravoor-Ezhupunna road and the Pallithode-Chellanam-Kochi beach road. The Alapuzha-Ernakulam Railway has a station nearby at Thuravoor. The Kuthiathode canal nearby was once the major waterway for transporting goods to the local market from Cochin via the Vembanad lake. The Kuthiathode canal connects the Vembanad lake with the Tazhappu backwaters. A small backwater lake at Tazhappu connects Kuthiathode with Valiathode. During Onam boat racing is held in Tazhappu backwaters.

== Contents ==
=== Temples and churches ===
- Nalukulangara Bhagavathi Temple
- St. Sebastian's Church, Naluklangara
- Ponpuram Muslim Jamath Mosque

=== Government offices ===
- Parayakad Post Office

=== Banks ===
- Parayakad Service Co-operative Bank

=== Schools ===
- Govt. L.P. School

=== Geographical co-ordinates ===
- Latitude 9.73066
- Longitude 76.33355
