= Eramalloor =

Eramalloor ezhupunna
- village
- Location in Kerala, India Eramalloor (India)
- Coordinates: 9°49′0″N 76°18′0″E
- Country: India
- State: Kerala
- District: Alappuzha

Government
  - Type: Panchayati raj (India)
  - Body: Gram panchayat
  - MLA: Adv. A.M. Arif (2006-2011, reelected in 2011)

Population (2011)
  - Total: 33,829

Languages
  - Official: Malayalam, English
- Time zone: UTC+5:30 (IST)
- PIN: 688537
- Telephone code: 0478
- Vehicle registration: KL32
- Nearest city: Kochi
- Literacy: 100%%
- Lok Sabha constituency: Alappuzha (Lok Sabha constituency)
- Vidhan Sabha constituency: Aroor
- Climate: Monsoon (Köppen)

Eramalloor is a village in Ezhupunna Grama Panchayat in the Cherthala taluk in Alappuzha district in the Indian state of Kerala.

== Demographics ==
As of 2011 India census, Eramalloor had a population of 33,829 with 16,999 males and 16,830 females.

== Geography ==
Eramalloor is a place in Ezhupunna village located on the NH66 Highway linking Kanyakumari, Trivandrum, Mangalore, Goa, Panvel (Mumbai). It is near the coast, with a landscape characterised by salty ponds (known locally as "Kandom") and larger ponds used for fishing (known as "Chaal"). It lies along the backwaters of Alappuzha, and is situated next to Ezhupunna near the model tourism village at Kumbalangi and the beach at Chellanam.

== Administration ==
Administratively, Eramalloor falls under the Ezhupunna panchayat (local village administrative body) of the Alappuzha District.

== Industry and economy ==
The village is famous for sea food processing industries, such as Torry Harris, Premier, AFDC and Diamond Seafoods. Agriculture has declined in the past years, with the paddy fields giving way for shrimp cultivation or to be reclaimed for housing.

== Educational Institutions ==
- NSLP (Kattisseri) School
- ECEK Union, Chammanad
- Santa Cruz Public School

== Places Of Worship ==
- Thottappalli Sreekrishna Temple
- Paingakulam Sree Partha Sarathi Temple
- Konanadu Devi Temple
- Subramania swamy temple
- Sree Dharma Shastha Temple, Chammanadu
- Kannukullangara Temple
- Kanjirathinkal Sree Khandakarna Devi Temple
- Chammanad Devi Temple
- Kizhakke Chammanad Devi Temple
- Sree krishna temple Sreenarayanapuram
- Saraswathi Temple
- Balasubramanya Swamy Temple
- St. Jude Church
- St. Joseph Church
- St. Francis Xavier's Church
- Masjid Rifai

== See also ==
- Kakkathuruth
