= Andhakaranazhy =

Andhakaranazhy Beach
- Village
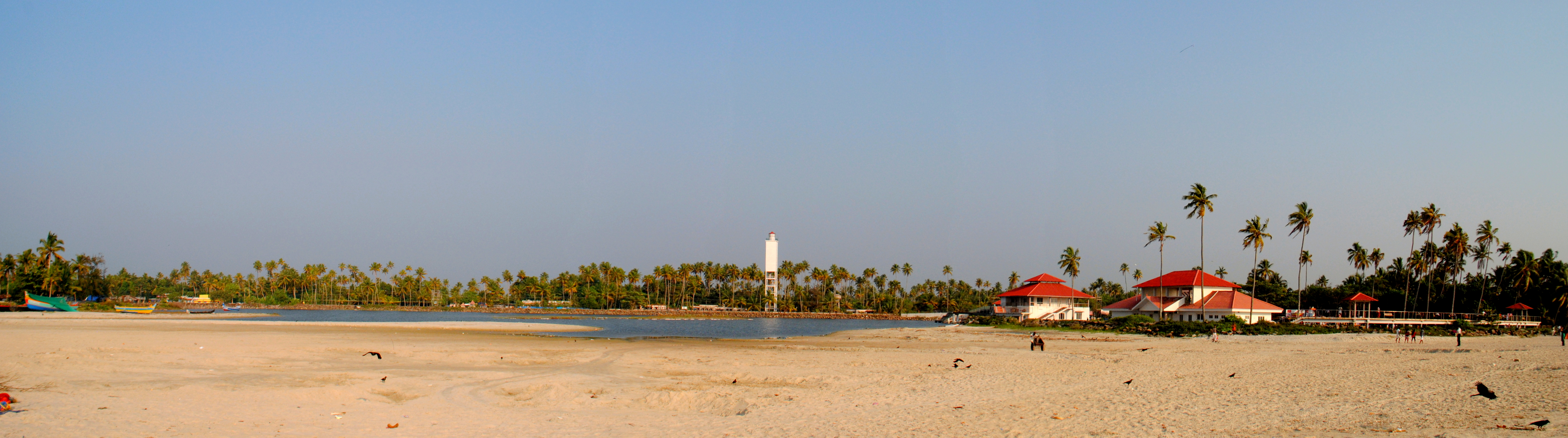
- Interactive map of Andhakaranazhy Beach
- Coordinates: 9.7479°N 76.284°E
- Country: India
- State: Kerala
- District: Alappuzha

Languages
  - Official: Malayalam
- Time zone: UTC+5:30 (IST)
- PIN: 688531
- Telephone code: 0478
- Vehicle registration: KL-32 or KL-04

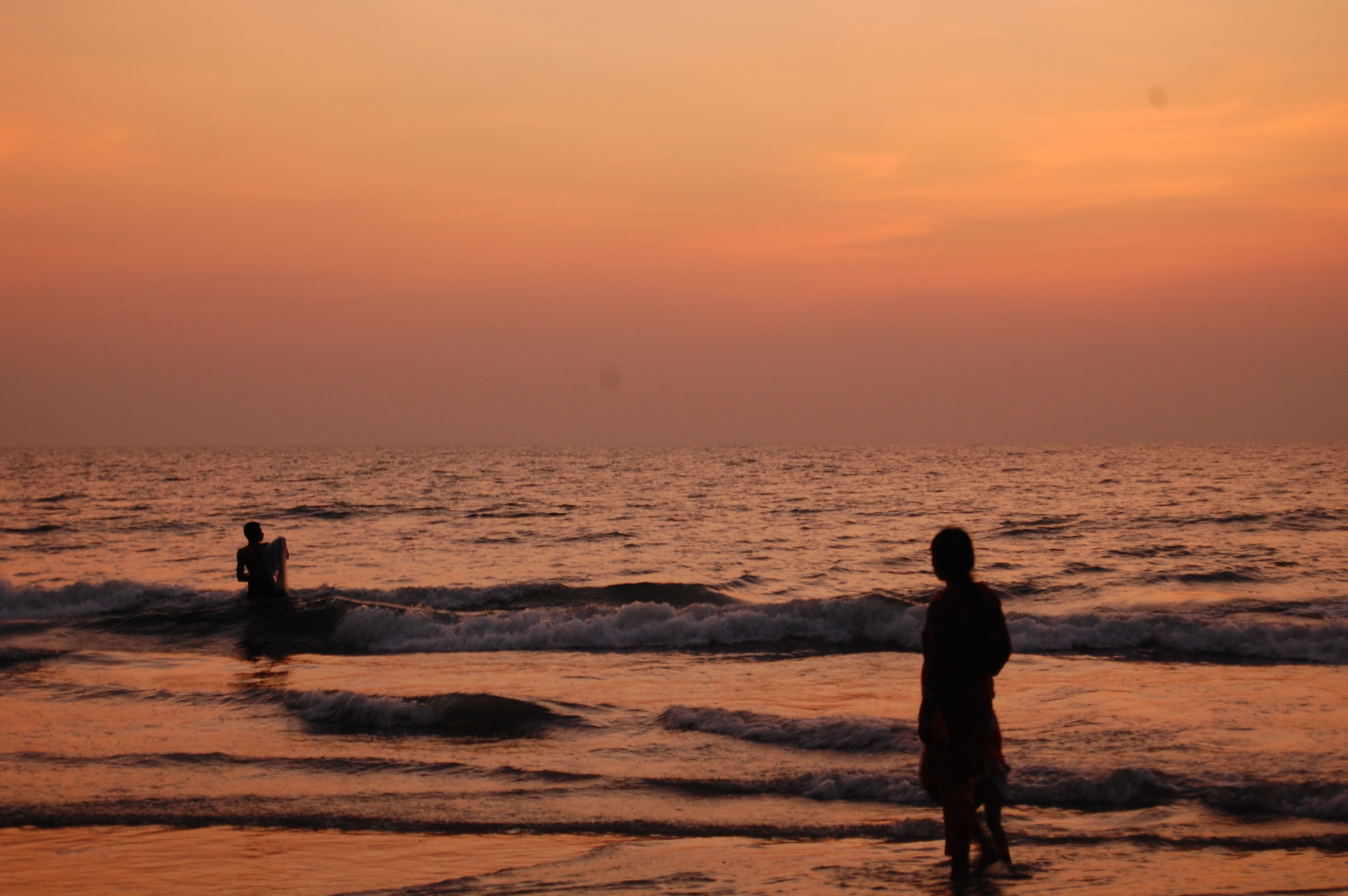
Andhakaranazhy

Andhakaranazhy ('Andhakaranazhi' Beach) is a coastal village located 4 km west of Pattanakkad under Pattanakkad Panchayath under Cherthala Taluk. It is famous for its beach which draws a number of domestic and international tourists. There are many Beachside homestays and boating services over the village.

== Geography ==
An azhy similar to an isthmus, is a sand sedimentation formed by the constant action of seawater where the backwaters merge into the sea. Two barges having large mechanized shutters are erected near the north and south end of the azhy. These shutters, operated by traction motors, help to regulate the flow of saline water entering into the neighboring paddy fields of Thuravoor, Pattanakkad, Ezhupunna, and Kuthiathode panchayats connected to thbackwaters. Water is released into the sea by lifting these shutters to prevent flooding in these paddy fields during excessive rains. A tall and majestic lighthouse near the azhy stands like a signal tower guiding the seamen during night. This lighthouse was open to the public during Onam, but is restricted now. This place is also one of the popular locations for Malayalam film shoots.

== Transportation ==
One can reach Andhakaranazhy via the Thanky – Andhakaranazhy – Pallithode beach road or divert towards west at Padmakshi Kavala - Kavilpalli junction on NH 66 between Pattanakkad and Thuravoor. Another easy road to reach the beach from highway is just take left side road from Padmakshikavala junction which is just 200 meters north of Ponnamveli bus stop when coming from Cherthala or Alappuzha side.

The nearest railway station is Vayalar. This place was one of the seriously affected areas in the tsunami which hit the Kerala coast on 26 December 2004.

A new bridge was constructed near the southern barge across the lake's isthmus. An aerial walkway was also constructed, extending to the sea wall and providing a panoramic view of sunsets. The walkway ends up to the tourist complex. The beach is visited by local residents and tourists.

== Celebrities ==
Smt. K. R. Gowri Amma, one of the cabinet ministers in the Kerala State's first elected government, is from this village. She was the sitting MLA from Aroor constituency for many years.

P R Ramachandran, One of the notable Educator, Author as well as a Philanthropist. He has done notable works for the upliftment of Students.

== Distance ==
Distance to Andhakaranazhy

From	Distance (km)	Time
New Delhi	2569	40 hours
Thiruvananthapuram	187	3 hours 45 minutes
Kochi	32	40 minutes
Kottayam	43	1 hour
Alappuzha	31	40 minutes

== Places of worship ==
- St. Xavier's Church, Azheeckal
- St. Antony's Church, Paduvapuram Vettackal
- Manakkodam Sree Mahadevi Khandakarna Temple
- Chellappuram Sri Khandakarna temple
- Al Furqan Salafi Juma Masjid
- St. Xavier's Church is the major Christian church in this area, and one of the oldest church in Alappuzha diocese. The parish conducted the famous "Abhishekagni" convention by Fr. Xavier Khan Vattayil in its centenary year of 2013 and again in 2014.
- The Viyathara Trimurthi temple, a very rare and old temple in Kerala, dedicated to tri-gods trimurthi Lord Shiva, Vishnu and Brahma consecrated in a single sreekovil is located in Andhakaranazhy. The mulla sowrupam was firstly situated in Goa; secondly in Kodugallor desham and thirdly in viyathara desham. The most important function in the temple, "Thripurasuradhahanum", will be conducted for Dhanu 15 in Malayalam month. The famous song, 'Unnyi nambinayee' (Tamil), actually is dedicated to Kodungallur Bhagavathy Temple. In deeply relation about the Kodungallur Kurubhabhagavathi temple. The Kandakarana temple is also located near the Trimurthi temple. The Subramanya temple dedicated to Lord Murugan is located near the lighthouse.

== Schools ==
- B.B.M L.P School
- L.F.M.L.P School pattom
