= Industries in Cherthala =

Industries in Cherthala, Kerala, India

The following are some of the industries in Cherthala, Kerala, India.

== Industries ==
=== Coir Industry ===
Cherthala has a rich tradition in coir production, owing to its proximity to coconut groves. The coir industry involves processing the husk of coconuts to create versatile products like mats, rugs, ropes, and geotextiles. Coir is the traditional and most widespread industrial produce in Cherthala. The coir industry is run under both the private and cooperative sectors. Politically well-organised coir workers and the availability of raw coir fibre are the primary resources of the coir industry in Cherthala. The big export houses have mechanised their plants with automated coir looms. They weave tons of coir carpets, door mats and jute items every month for exports. Carpets and mats are displayed in the showrooms along NH 66.

=== Handicrafts and Cottage Industries ===
Cherthala is also known for its thriving handicrafts and cottage industries. Skilled artisans and weavers produce many traditional and contemporary products, including handwoven textiles, woodcraft, and pottery.

=== Agro-Based Industries ===
The region's fertile land and agricultural resources have increased agro-based industries. These industries include food processing, spices production, and agrochemicals. Cherthala's agro-based sectors contribute to the local community's value addition and employment generation.

=== Tourism and Hospitality ===
Cherthala's scenic backwaters, lush landscapes, and historical sites have made it a popular tourist destination. The tourism and hospitality industry in Cherthala encompasses hotels, resorts, homestays, and related services.

=== Seafood Industries ===
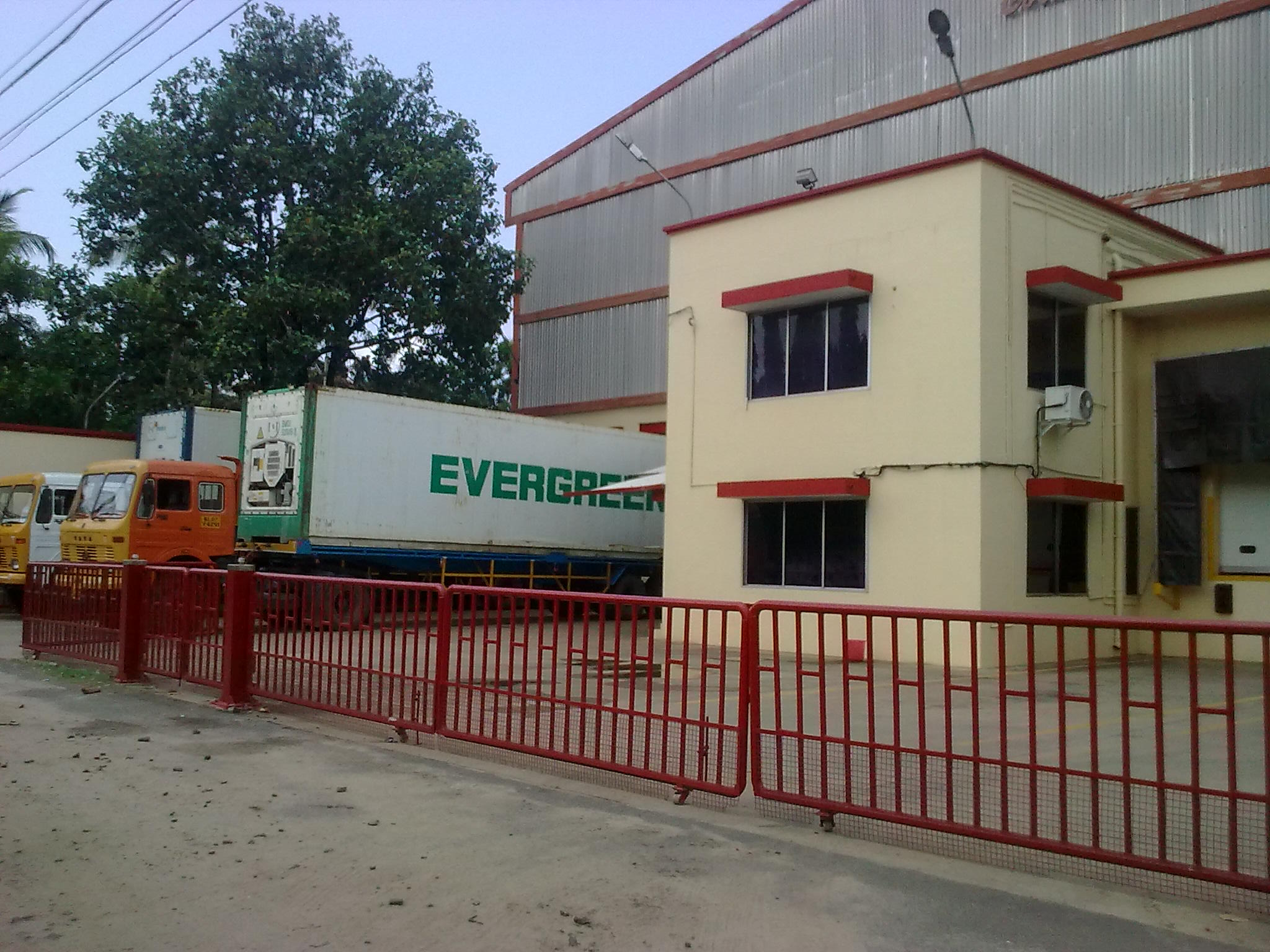
A seafood export processing plant at Aroor. The cold-storage shipment containers are seen in the front of the plant.

The coastal inland area of Cherthala is closely interlocked with the Kerala backwaters and Vembanad lake. This eco-system is utilized for large-scale Prawn and Shrimp farming as an alternative in the low-lying paddy fields. Secondly the Cochin fishing harbour and port is just 15 km away from Aroor. The abundance of marine wealth and logistical advantages has helped the seafood export to grow especially around Aroor, Chandiroor, Ezhupunna, Thuravoor, Arookutty. Shrimp, Squid, Cuttle fish and other fin fishes are some of the raw marine wealth processed and exported. There are many marine food processing units in these places which provide employment to large number of people. The raw seafood catch is also purchased by large seafood export firms from all parts of Kerala, South Karnataka, Odisha, Tamil Nadu etc., processed and preserved in cold storages and then trans-shipped through Cochin port.

=== Construction and Building Materials ===
Cherthala's growing urbanisation has spurred the demand for construction materials. The town hosts industries related to brick-making, cement products, and building materials, supporting the construction sector's needs.

=== Textiles and Garments ===
Textile manufacturing, including the production of garments and fabrics, is another significant industry in Cherthala. Local textile units produce a range of products catering to domestic markets.

=== Rubber and Rubber Products ===
Cherthala's proximity to rubber plantations has led to the growth of rubber-related industries. Manufacturing rubber products such as tires, footwear, and industrial goods is a notable segment of the local industrial landscape.

=== Chemical and Allied Industries ===
The chemical and allied industries encompass a range of activities, including manufacturing chemicals, pharmaceuticals, and industrial gases. These industries contribute to both local consumption and exports.

=== Breweries ===
United Spirits Ltd (Mc-Dowell distillery), established by the UB Group, is a major industry in the town and it is established on the bank of Vembanadu lake in Varanadu, Cherthala. United Breweries Group, Varanad manufactures Beer in the brand name Kingfisher.

=== Industrial area ===
The industrial areas at Aroor and Maithara have many small and medium scale industrial units. The Kerala State Electronics Development Corporation Limited has a control and instrumentation division running in Aroor.

=== Information Technology (IT) and Services ===
With the global surge in technology, Cherthala has also ventured into the IT and services sector. The town's IT companies provide software development, IT consulting, and related services, contributing to the growth of the knowledge-based economy. An IT Info park complex and associated township is coming up near Pallippuram, 8 km North of Cherthala Town.

=== IGC Pallipuram ===
The Industrial area named Industrial Growth Centre Pallipuran A associated with KSIDC township has been established near Pallippuram, 9 km North of Cherthala Town.
