= Kuthiathode =

- Village
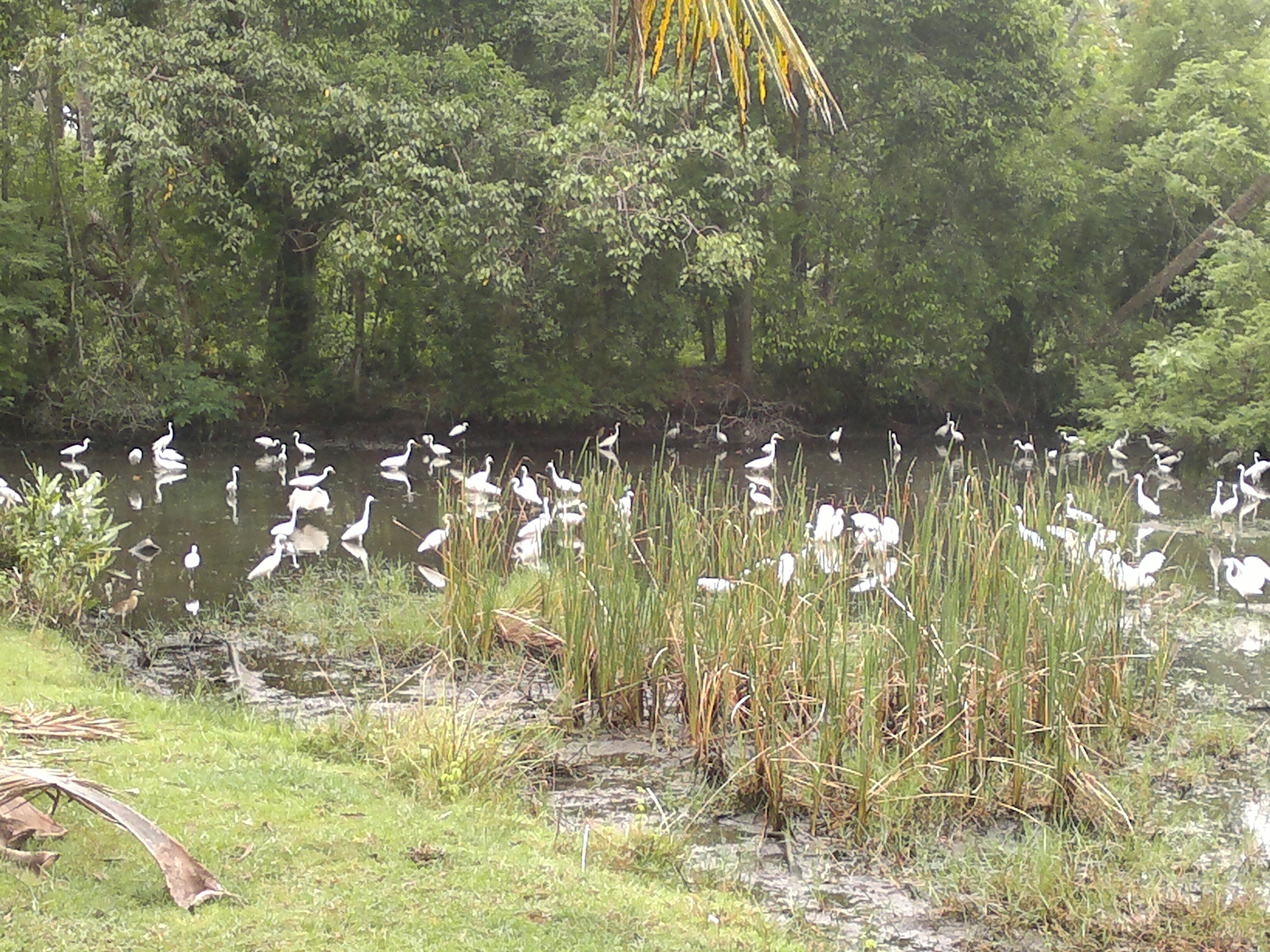
- Interactive map of Kuthiathode
- Coordinates: 9°48′0″N 76°20′0″E
- Country: India
- State: Kerala
- District: Alappuzha

Government
  - Body: Panchayat

Population (2011)
  - Total: 23,669

Languages
  - Official: Malayalam, English
- Time zone: UTC+5:30 (IST)
- PIN: 688533
- Telephone code: 0478
- Vehicle registration: KL-32
- Nearest city: Kochi
- Lok Sabha constituency: Alappuzha
- Niyamasabha constituency: Aroor
- Civic agency: Panchayat

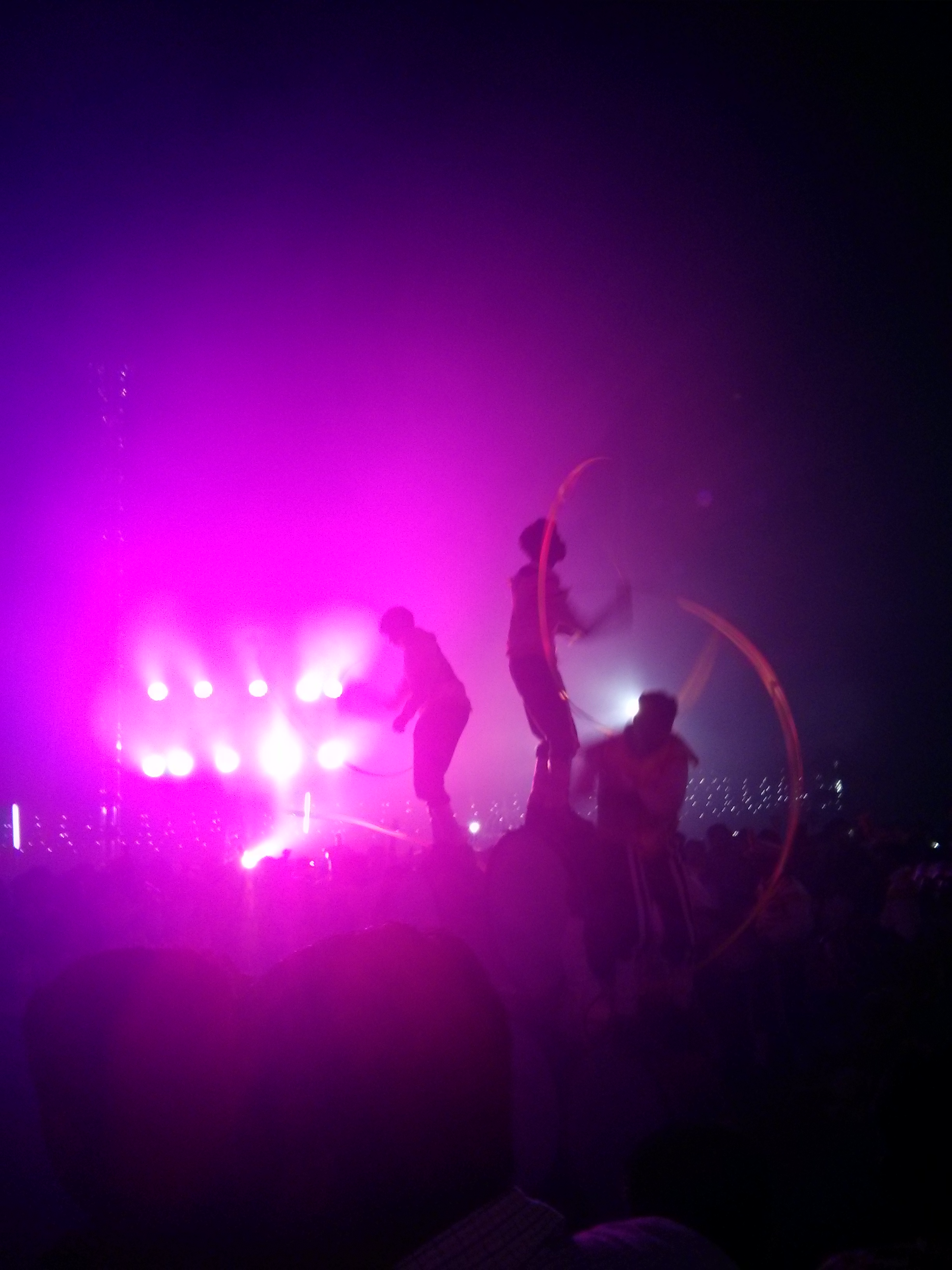
Church festival at Kuthiathode

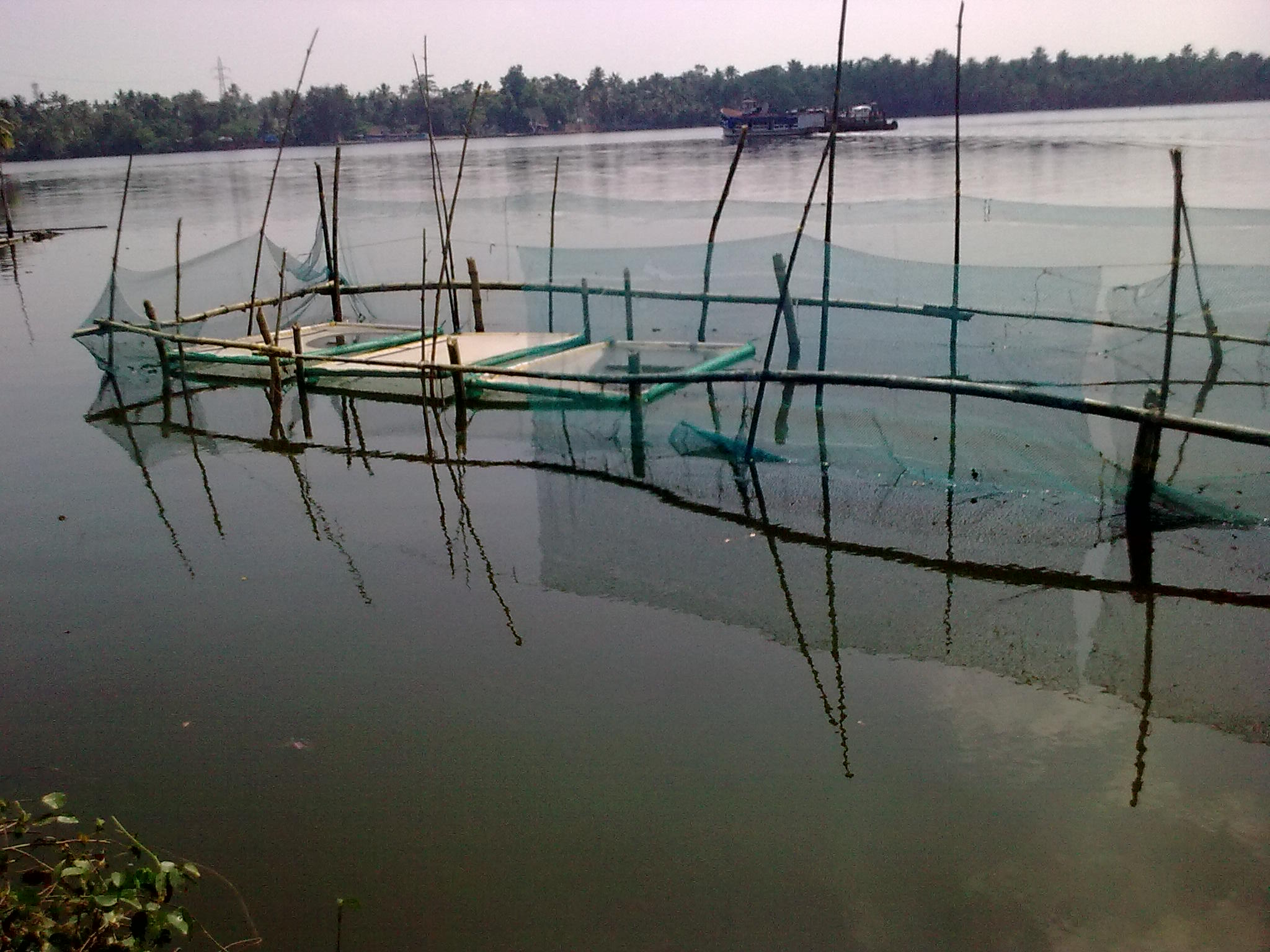
Shrimp farming in the backwaters near Thycattusery -Thuravoor ferry

Kuthiathode is a gram panchayat in Alappuzha district in the Indian state of Kerala. It is only 20 minutes from Kochi city.

== Geography ==
The Kuthiathode or river stream, was once the major waterway for transporting goods to the local market from Kochi via the Vembanad lake.

== History ==
The name Kuthiathode comes from Kuthia (dug)+ thode (canal) means a dug-canal.

The Panchayat has a Gandhi memorial inside its office dedicated to Mahathma Gandhi who visited this place during the Pre-Independence period.

== Demographics ==
As of 2011 India census, Kuthiathode had a population of 23,669 with 11,483 males and 12,186 females.

The population consists of Ezhavas, Nairs, Nampoothiris, Gouda Saraswat Brahmins, Tamil Brahmins, Pulayas, Kudumbis, Muslims, and Christians living harmoniously together.

== Administration ==
Kuthiathode is under the Pattanakkad development block.

Kuthiathode, Vallethode, Parayakad, Nallukulanagara, Pallithode, Chapakadavu, Tirumalabhagom, Thazhuppu, Thuravoor North, and Valamangalam North are the local areas under the panchayat.

The panchayat office has a library and a community hall. The Kuthiathode village office, Krishi Bhavan office, government veterinary clinic, excise range office, BSNL telephone exchange and sub-treasury are also located in Kuthiathode.

Kuthiathode is within the Aroor state assembly constituency.

== Schools ==
- Govt. West UP School, Thuravoor
- Government Primary School, Tirumalabhagam
- Government Upper Primary School, Parayakadu
- St. Sebastian High School, Pallithode
- St. Thomas Lower Primary School, Pallithode
- Spring of Arts Academy, Kuthiathode.(Study center of Music & Arts)
- T.D. Higher Secondary School
- V V H S S Kodamthuruth

== Transportation ==
The village is well connected to the nearest towns by NH-47, Thuravoor-Ezhupunna road and the Pallithode-Chellanam-Kochi beach road. The Alapuzha-Ernakulam Railway has a crossing station at Thuravoor.

== Economy ==
The local market on both sides of the river was a major commercial hub around the locality. Even now, the market exists with a few wholesale traders selling vegetables and other provisions. The vast agricultural lands on the western side, or the Thuravoor Kari, where large-scale paddy cultivation and shrimp farming are done annually and serve as the seasonal livelihood for many of them. A large number of shrimp peeling sheds operating in this panchayat provide large-scale employment.

=== Industrial Units ===
- Steel and Heavy Industries Kerala Ltd.
- Higasimaru Feeds
- Veepack Industries

== Tourism ==
The Crystal Museum at Pallithode Beach is the only crystal museum in South India. The scenic location is part of its appeal to tourists, exhibiting the landscape of paddy fields on both sides of the Pallithode-Chavady. Additionally, there is a panoramic view of Chinese fishing nets across the Pallithode backwaters from the Pallithode bridge. A small backwater lake at Tazzupu connects Kuthiathode with Valiathode. During Onam, boat racing is held in Tazzupu backwaters and also attracts many seasonal tourists.

== Religious buildings ==
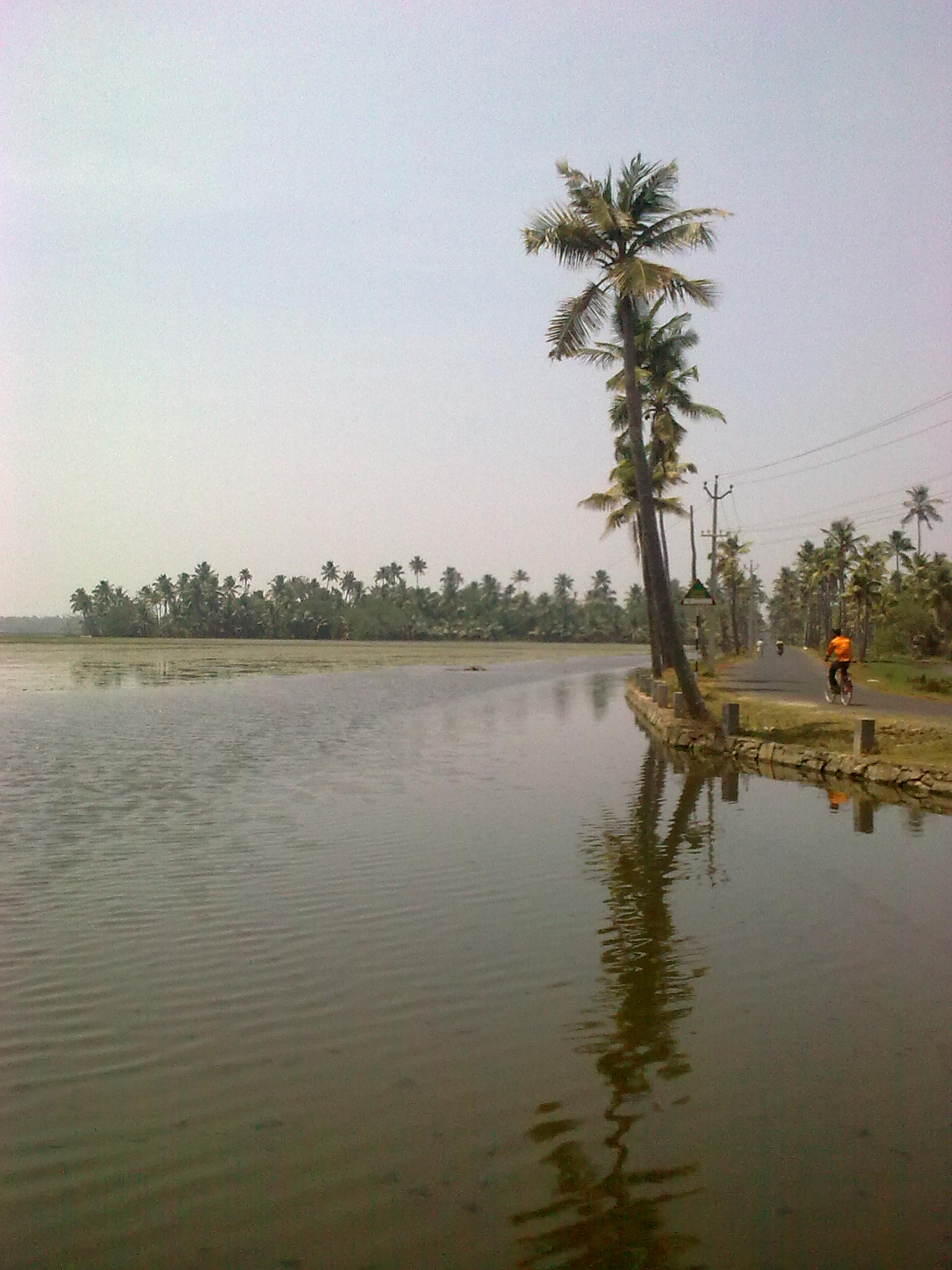
Pallithode bund road running across the Thuravoor kari

=== Hindu temples ===
- Pattukulangara Devi Temple
- Velnjur temple
- Amedathu kavu Devi temple
- Nalukulangara Devi Temple
- Nalikattu Subramanian Temple
- Kuthiathode Dharma Sastha temple
- Thirumala Devasom - Sree Lakshmi Narasimha Temple
- Thirumala Devasom - Arthikulangara Devi Temple
- Thuravoor Thirumala Bhagom Sree Mahadeva Temple
- Pallithode Helapuram Devi Temple
- Pallithode Sree Krishnaswamy Temple

=== Mosques ===
- Rahmathul Islam Masjid, near KP Junction
- Ponnpuram Jamat Masjid- Chavady
- Masjid-Ul-Ansar - near North Railway cross
- Salafi Masjid, near petrol pump
- Thuravoor Jumua Masjid, near NCC Junction
- Kuthiathode Juma Masjid & Darul Uloom Madrasa

=== Churches ===
- Kodamthuruthu Fathima Matha Church
- St. Joseph Church, Kuthiathode
- St. Sebastein Church, Nalukulangara
- St. Monica's Church, Mariapuram, near railway station
- St. Sebastian Church, Pallithode
- St. Antony's Church, Chappakadavu
