= State Highway 66 (Kerala) =

Highway in Kerala, India

State Highway 66
- Alappuzha - Thoppumpady Road
- SH 66 highlighted in red

Route information
- Maintained by Kerala Public Works Department
- Length: 51.72 km (32.14 mi)

Major junctions
- South end: NH 66 in Alappuzha
- North end: NH 966B in Thoppumpady

Location
- Country: India
- State: Kerala
- Districts: Alappuzha, Ernakulam

Highway system
- Roads in India; Expressways; National; State; Asian; State Highways in Kerala
← SH 65	→ SH 67

State Highway 66 (SH 66) is a state highway in Kerala, India that starts in Alappuzha and ends in Thoppumpady. The highway is 44.1 km long. Famous pilgrimage shrines such as Arthunkal, Thumpoly and Kannamali are on this route. Arthunkal - Thumpoly -Kannamaly .

== Route map ==
Alappuzha - Thumpoly - Mararikulam - Arthunkal - Thyckkal - Ottamassery - Andhakaranazhy - Pallithodu - Kannamaly - Thoppumpady. Alappuzha -Thumpoly - Arthunkal - Andhakaranazhy - Thoppumpady .

== See also ==
- Roads in Kerala
- List of state highways in Kerala
