= Viswambharan =

Viswambharan is a surname. Notable people with the surname include:

- P. Viswambharan (1925–2016), Indian politician, journalist and trade unionist
- P. G. Viswambharan (1947–2010), Indian film director
- Thuravoor Viswambharan (1943–2017), Indian academic and writer
