= Manakkodam Lighthouse =

Lighthouse in Kerala, India

Manakkodam Lighthouse Manaccur
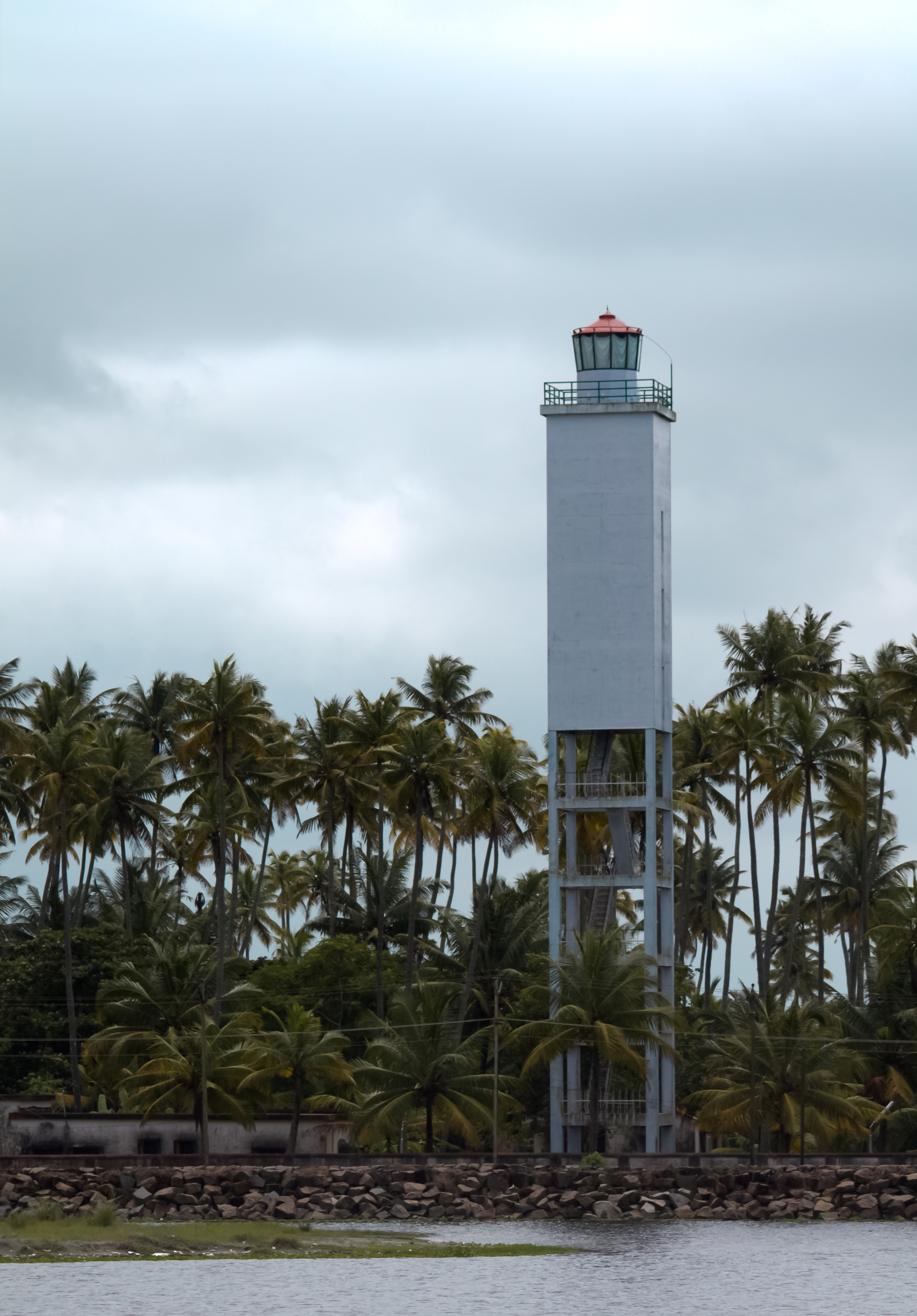
- The lighthouse in 2012
- Location: Andhakaranazhy, Cherthala, Kerala, India
- Coordinates: 9°44′54″N 76°17′11″E

Tower
- Constructed: 1979
- Construction: reinforced concrete tower
- Height: 30 metres (98 ft)
- Shape: square tower lower half skeletal upper half closed, with balcony and lantern
- Markings: white tower, red lantern

Light
- Focal height: 35.67 metres (117.0 ft)
- Light source: main power
- Intensity: 500/550 W Metal Halide Lamp (220/250 V AC)
- Range: 18.4 nautical miles (34.1 km; 21.2 mi)
- Characteristic: Fl (2) W 10s.

Manakkodam Lighthouse is situated next to the Andhakaranazhy beach in the Alappuzha district of Kerala near Cherthala. The tower is a 33.8 metres (110.9 ft) high concrete structure with square cross section. It was inaugurated on 1 August 1979. There were no lights in this area before 1979. The light source was changed from incandescent lamp to metal halide on 21 September 1998. The light source flashes twice in ten seconds.

== History ==
The Manakkodam Lighthouse was first planned in 1972 with a 30 m cylindrical tower design, but due to weak substrata the plan was revised to a four‑column reinforced‑concrete structure supporting a service room. Construction was completed in 1979, and the lighthouse was commissioned on 1 August 1979, marking the first navigational light in the region. The original incandescent lamp was replaced by a 230 V, 400 W metal‑halide lamp on 21 September 1998, and later upgraded to a cluster of three 150 W lamps on 22 November 2006 to improve reliability and luminous intensity. In 2022, ₹1 (equivalent to ₹1.06 in 2023) was offered by Central Government to develop various facilities at the lighthouse under Alappuzha marina-cum-cargo project, part of Sagar Mala project.

== Structure and Specifications ==
The lighthouse is a 33.8 m‑high square reinforced‑concrete tower with a skeletal lower half and a closed upper half, painted white with a red lantern. Its focal plane is at 35.67 m above mean sea level, and the light characteristic is Fl(2) W 10s (two white flashes every 10 seconds). The optical system is a 300 mm fourth‑order revolving drum optic within a 2.4 m‑diameter lantern house, originally supplied by J. Stone & Co. Ltd., India. Power is drawn from the coastal mains supply (440 V, 50 Hz) with a standby generator provided on site. Continuous maintenance is performed by the Directorate General of Lighthouses and Lightships, ensuring the structure and equipment remain operational for coastal shipping and local fishing communities.

From below

Surroundings

== See also ==
- List of lighthouses in India
