= Thuravoor railway station =

Railway station in Kerala, India

Thuravoor

General information
- Location: Thuravoor, Alappuzha, Kerala; India
- Coordinates: 9.7750°N 76.3103°E
- System: Regional rail, Light rail & Commuter rail station
- Owner: Indian Railways
- Operator: Southern Railway zone
- Line: Kayamkulam-Alappuzha-Ernakulam
- Platforms: 2
- Tracks: 3

Construction
- Structure type: At–grade
- Parking: Available
- Accessible: Disabled access

Other information
- Status: Functioning
- Station code: TUVR
- Zone(s): Southern Railway zone
- Division(s): Thiruvananthapuram
- Fare zone: Indian Railways

History
- Opened: 1989; 37 years ago
Route map
Location

Thuravoor railway station (station code: TUVR) is an NSG–6 category Indian railway station in Thiruvananthapuram railway division of Southern Railway zone. It is a railway station in Alappuzha District, Kerala and falls under the Thiruvananthapuram railway division of the Southern Railway zone, Indian Railways.
