= Nalukulangara Maha Devi Temple =

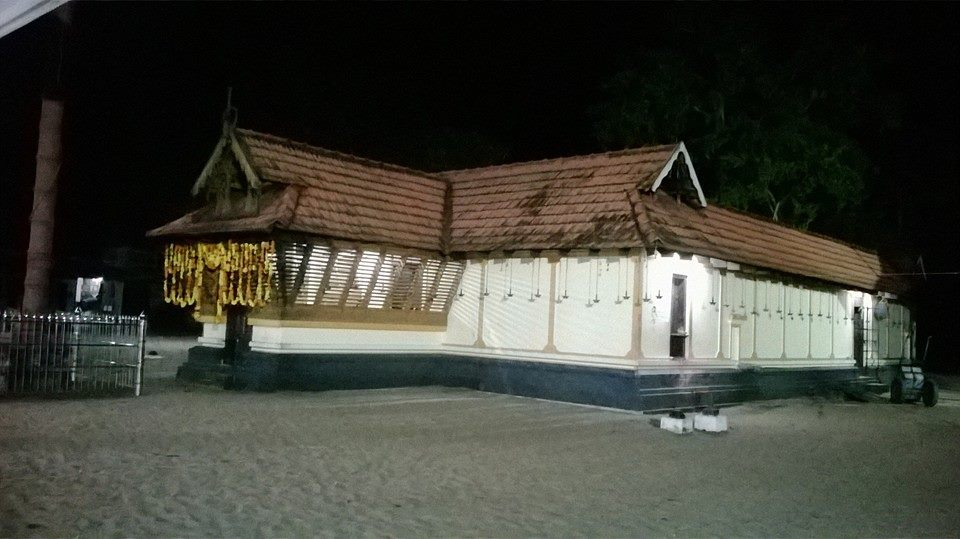

- Nalukulangara Maha Devi Temple, Kuthiathode, Alappuzha, Kerala

Religion
- Affiliation: Hinduism
- District: Alappuzha
- Deity: Bhagavathy (Nalakulangara Maha Devi)
- Festivals: Nalukulangara Pooram, Pongala

Location
- Location: Kuthiathode
- State: Kerala
- Country: India
- Coordinates: 9.780583°N 76.304850°E

Architecture
- Type: Architecture of Kerala
- Temple: One

Nalukulangara Maha Devi Temple is situated in Kuthiathode Panchayath in Kerala, India. It is a prominent Devi temple in Alappuzha. It is situated 1 km from Pattukulangara Junction. It hosts the idol of the goddess Bhadrakali (popularly known as "Nalukulangara Amma") together with Sivan, Subrahmanyan, Bhalabhadra, etc. It is popularly called "Nalukulangara Mahadevi". The annual temple festival (Kodiyettu Ulsavom – Malayalam calendar Makaram — Makom Thozal and Pooram) is held there. Vrichikom 1st Pongala is a ladies' fest.

== Festivals ==
=== Nalukulangara Pooram ===
Nalukulangara Pooram is a popular temple festival in Kerala. It is held on the Pooram (Malayalam: പൂരം, (Malayalam pronunciation: [puːɾam])) day of the Malayalam calendar month of Makaram. Pooram is the day when the moon rises with the Pooram star. People celebrate Pooram without any religious difference.

== Other deities ==
In the outer temple shrines for Shiva, Murukan, and Saraswathi are present.
