= Nalukulangara Pooram =

Festival in Kerala, India

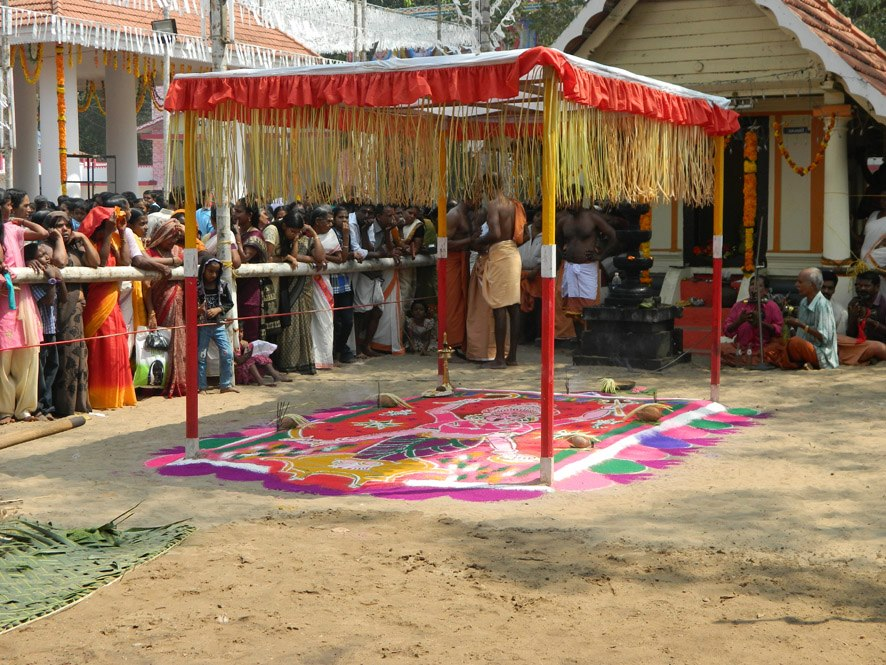
- Official name: Nalukulangara Pooram
- Date: Pooram Nakshatra in Malayalam Calendar Month Makram

Nalukulangara Pooram is a popular temple festival of the South Indian state of Kerala. It is held at the Nalukulangara Maha Devi Temple in Alleppy District every year on the 'Pooram' (Malayalam: പൂരം, pronounced [puːɾam]) day of the Malayalam Calendar month of 'Makaram'. 'Pooram' day is the day when the moon rises with the Pooram star. People celebrate pooram without any religious difference. And it is a good time for street vendors.
