= Parayakad, Ernakulam =

Village in Ernakulam District, Kerala, India

Coordinates: 10.086009°N 76.260473°E

Parayakadu, Ernakulam is also known as Parayad or Parayakad within the Chittatukara Village Panchayat, North Paravur Paravur Taluk, Ernakulam district, Kerala, India.

There is also a village known as Parayakad in Alappuzha (Alleppey) district under Kuthiathode grama panchayat and Cherthala taluk.

== Administration ==
Bus route to this place is:- (1) Through Panchayat Route, via Kannankulangara, which reach directly at this place, and goes to Kottukadu etc. thereafter. (2) Through Chendamangalam road, buses which pass through Chalipalam to be boarded. From Chalipalam this place is 10 minutes walk. And (3) Through Parayakad Junction/Kavala, the buses going to Kodungalur, normally go through this route. From Parayakad Kavala, walking time is about 15 minutes, to reach this place. This Area's Electricity Board Office is at Vadakkumpuram/ Kootukadu, named KSEB, Chennamangalam (Chendamangalam), Vadakkumpuram PO, Pin-683521. Village office is North Paravur at Kannankulangara. The Panchayat Office is Chittatukara Grama Panchayat, office is located at Munambam Junction. Its post office is North Paravur, Pin-683513. Police station for this area is the Police Station Vadakkekara, for which the Post Office Moothakunnam, pin 683516 is the address. To go to this police station, the buses en route Kodungalur to the boarded and bus stop is Andippili-kavu.

== Schools ==
There is Government LP School, up to 4th standard, both English and Malayalam Medium. After that the nearest school is DD Sabha School, Karimpadam. Another High School at a distance is Paliyam High School, Chendamangalam.

== Temples ==
- Parayakad Guruthipadam Bhagavathy Temple. It have Prathistadinam On July each year, and on first Tuesday of each Malayalam Month, there are special Puja and Feast on these days.
- Sree Narayana Guru Temple:- the SNDP union at this place conducts puja on Chadayam day of each Malayalam Month, followed by Feast.

== Institutions ==
DP Sabha:- The DP Sabha at Parayakad conducts free classes for Computer Courses and other vocational courses, in association with Govt Polytechnic.

== Tourist attraction ==
Back-water of Parayakad Bridge is at walking distance. Bus journey to Kodungallur Kurumba Bhagavathy temple is just above Minimum distance ticket fare. The same route proceeds to Guruvayur also.

Surrounded by:- Parayakad is surrounded by the places named Cheriya Pallamthuruthu, Kuttukadu, and Valiya Pallam Thuruthu. At Valiya Pallamthuruthu, there is Homoeo dispensary of Chittatukara Panchayat, which functions 9 am to 2 pm, Monday to Saturday.
