= Thuravoor Viswambharan =

Indian academic (1931-2017)

Prof. Thuravoor Viswambharan
- Born: 5 September 1943; Thuravoor, Alappuzha, Kerala, India
- Died: 20 October 2017 (aged 74); Ernakulam, Kerala, India
- Occupations: Writer and professor
- Spouse: Kanchana
- Children: 2

Thuravoor Viswambharan (5 September 1943 – 20 October 2017), was a Sanskrit scholar, active social worker and writer from the Thuravoor village in the southern state Kerala in India. He was an expert professor on Hindu epics Ramayana, Mahabharata and Vedas. He was a professor in Malayalam, Sanskrit, Indian Mythology and Vedic Science at Maharaja's College Ernakulam, Cochin. He was the state president of Tapasya Kala Sahithya Vedi and the founder president of Vishwa Samvad Kendra Kerala. He made a brief foray into politics as the BJP candidate for the Thrippunithura constituency in the state assembly election of 2016, although he was unsuccessful. He was the host of a popular television show named Bharatha Darshanam, which was telecast in Amrita TV on the basis of Mahabharata, and went up to more than 3000 episodes. In this programme, he used to answer various questions regarding to Mahabharata, using his own view point and mixing various contemporary social issues. He was battling with cancer for a long time and died on 20 October 2017 at Sudheendra Mission Hospital in Ernakulam. He was cremated at Ravipuram Crematorium in Ernakulam. He is survived by his wife Prof. Kanchana, who was also his colleague in Maharaja's College, and their two daughters.
