= Kannamaly =

- Village
- Kannamaly
- Map showing Kannamaly
- Coordinates: 9.88020°N 76.26262°E
- Country: India
- State: Kerala
- District: Ernakulam district
- Taluk: Kochi
- Grama Panchayat: Chellanam
- Time zone: IST

Kannamaly is a coastal suburb of Kochi situated in Chellanam Panchayat in the Ernakulam district of Kerala, India. It comes under the Kochi taluk. The place is well-known all over Kerala state for the St Joseph's pilgrim Centre and the feast along with 'nercha sadhya' (votive meal) on March 19 that attract massive crowds every year.

== Geography ==
Kannamaly is situated in the coast of Arabian Sea. The village shares its border with Arabian sea in west, Kannamali kayal in east, Kandakadavu in south and Cheriyakadavu in north.

== History ==
This place was a seaport in ancient times. There were telescopes in the highest points of the seaport for detecting the ships arriving to the port.

== Feast of St Joseph ==
Kannamaly celebrates St Joseph's Feast on March 19 every year with a massive communal meal. On that day many hundreds of thousands gather at Kannamaly to pay respects to St Joseph and to take part in the 'nercha sadhya' (solemn meal). The shrine of St Joseph is attached to St Antony's Parish Church. The custom dates back to the early 1900s when an outbreak of Cholera epidemic in the area killed a large number of people. It is believed that the custom of a communal meal got started in 1905, when the epidemic came to an end with a similar meal on March 19.

== Etymology ==
The word Kannamaly is a combination of two words Kannu and Maly. The word Kannu means eye and maly means seaport.
