= Chinese fishing nets =

Type of stationary lift net in India and Indonesia

Kochi chinese fishing-net in fort kochi

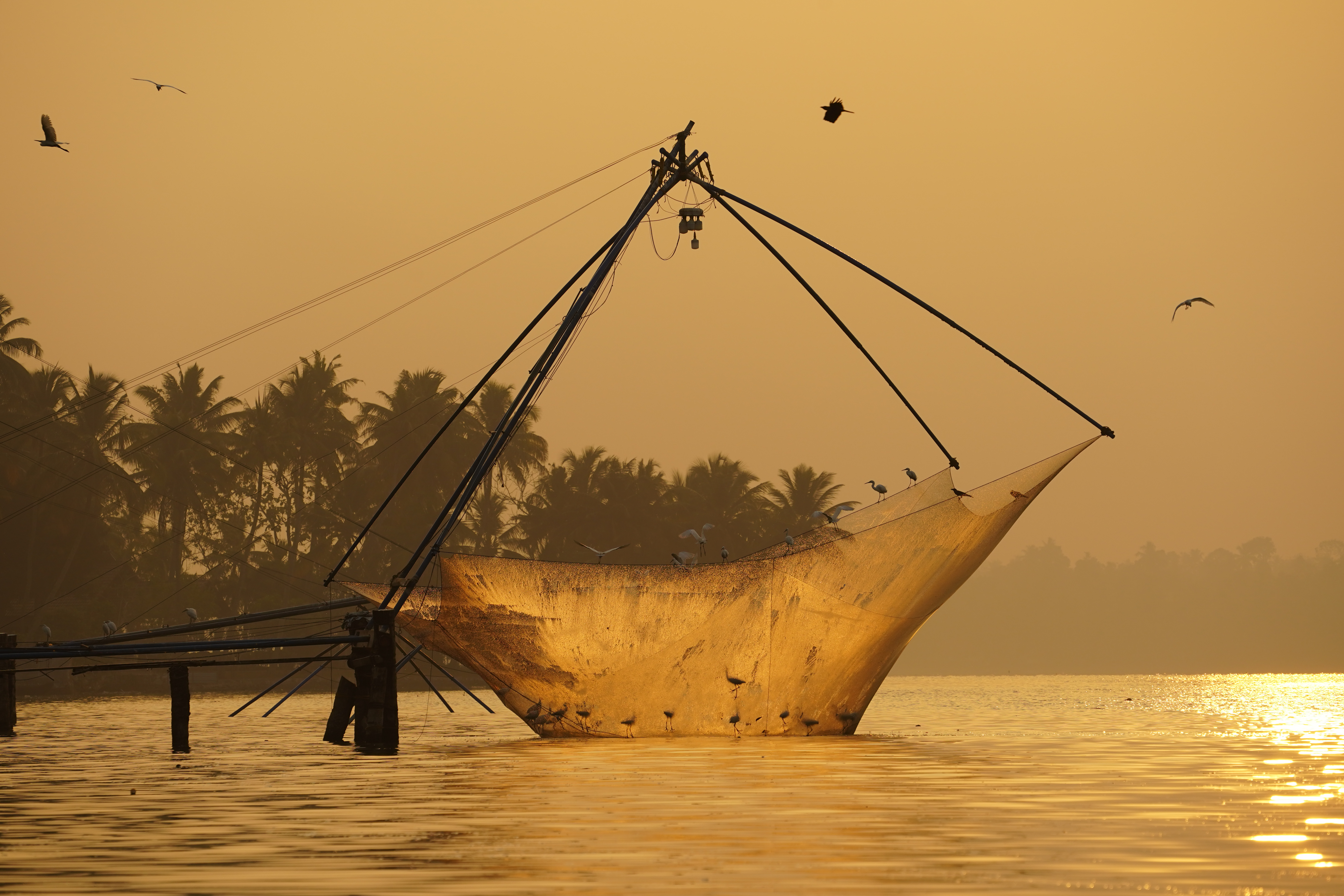
Chinese fishing net in Kollam, Kerala, India

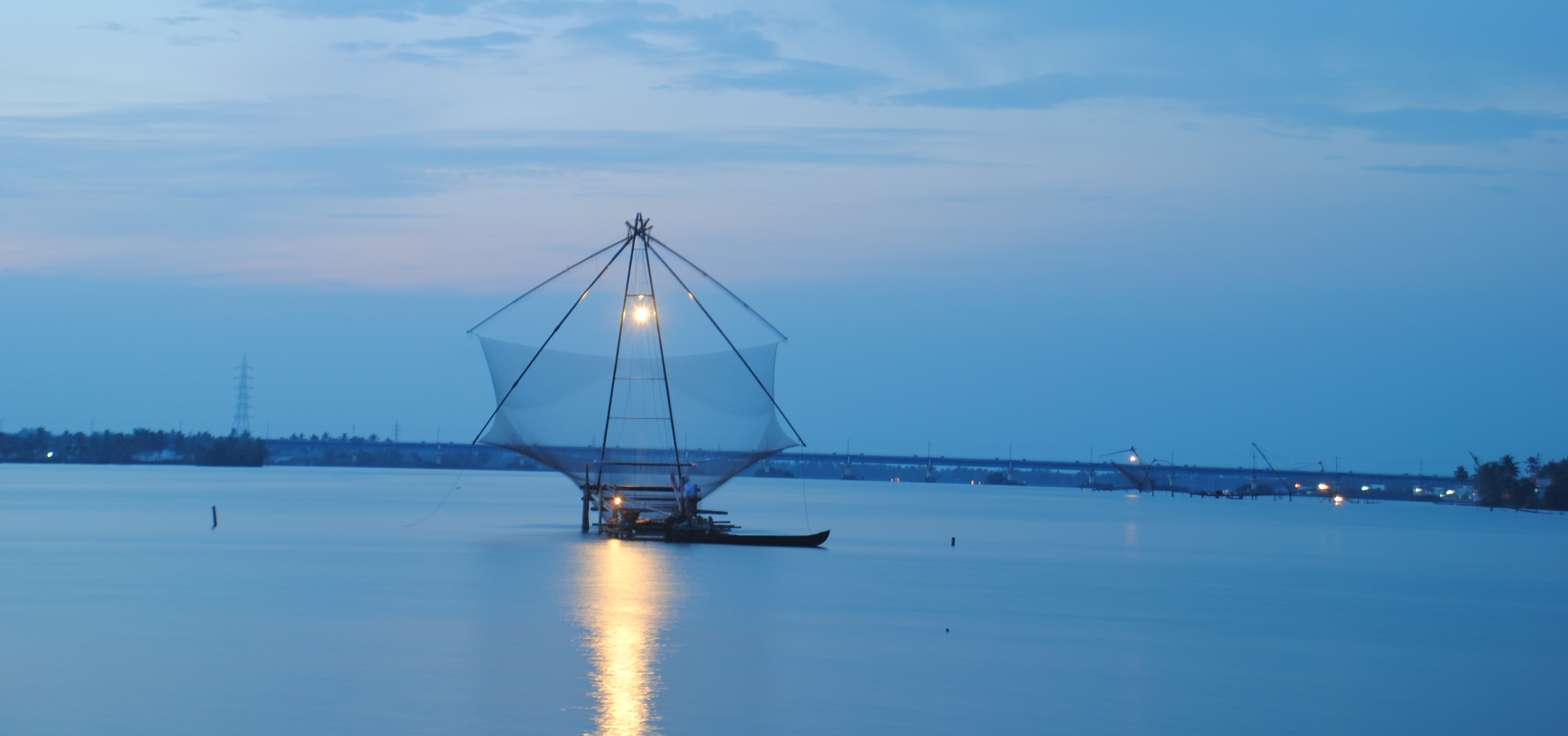
Chinese fishing net. A blue hour view from Marine Drive, Kochi

Chinese fishing nets (Cheena vala in India or tangkul in Indonesia) are a type of stationary lift net in India and Indonesia. They are fishing nets that are fixed land installations for fishing. While commonly known as "Chinese fishing nets" in India, the more formal name for such nets is "shore operated lift nets". Huge mechanical contrivances hold out horizontal nets of 20 m or more across. Each structure is at least 10 m high and comprises a cantilever with an outstretched net suspended over the sea and large stones suspended from ropes as counterweights at the other end. Each installation is operated by a team of up to six fishermen. While such nets are used throughout coastal southern China and Indochina, in India they are mostly found in the Indian cities of Kochi and Kollam, where they have become a tourist attraction. This way of fishing is unusual in India and almost unique to the area, as it was introduced by Chinese explorers who landed there in the 14th century. Indeed, one interpretation of the city name Kochi is ‘co-chin', meaning ‘like China.’

The system is sufficiently balanced that the weight of a man walking along the main beam is sufficient to cause the net to descend into the sea. The net is left for a short time, possibly just a few minutes, before it is raised by pulling on ropes. The catch is usually modest: a few fish and crustaceans, which may be sold to passers-by within minutes.

Rocks, each 30 cm or so in diameter, are suspended from ropes of different lengths. As the net is raised, some of the rocks one-by-one come to rest on a platform thereby keeping everything in balance.

Each installation has a limited operating depth. Consequently, an individual net cannot be continually operated in tidal waters. Different installations will be operated depending on the state of the tide.

The nets may have been introduced by the Chinese explorer Zheng He.

The Chinese fishing nets have become a very popular tourist attraction because of their size and rhythm of operation. In addition, catches can be purchased individually and taken only a short distance to street cooks who'll cook them.

== Gallery ==
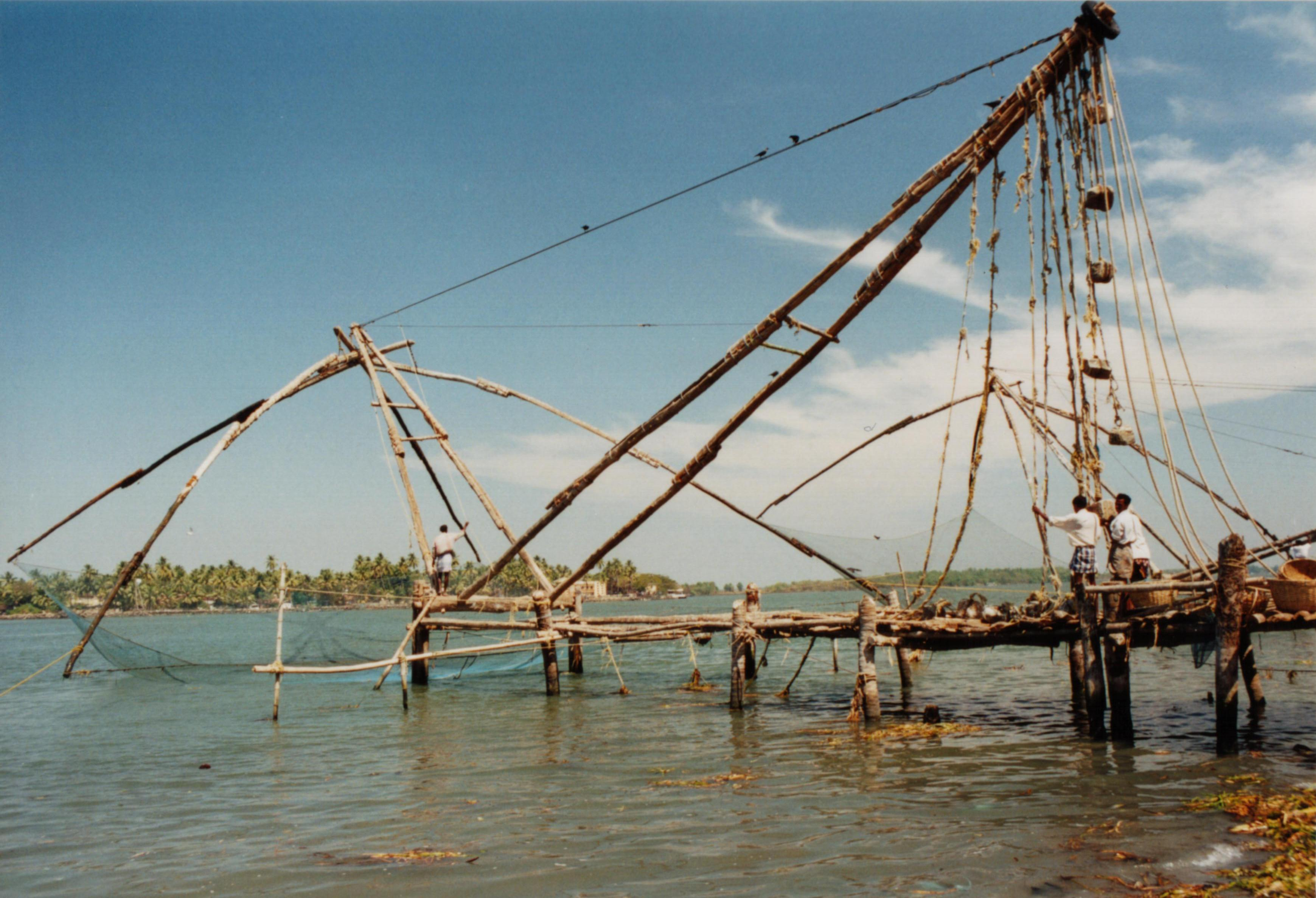
Chinese fishing nets at Kochi

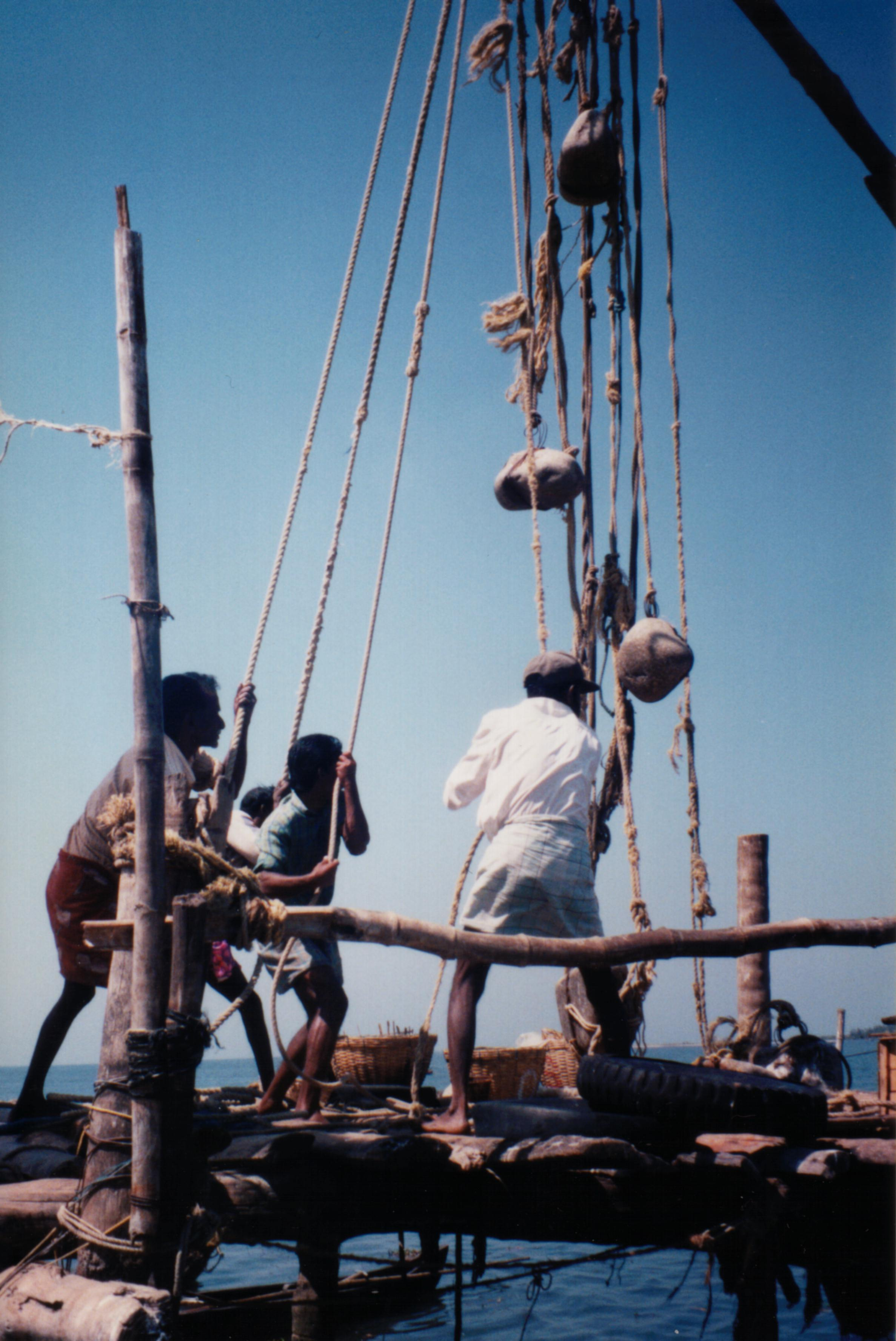
Raising the net

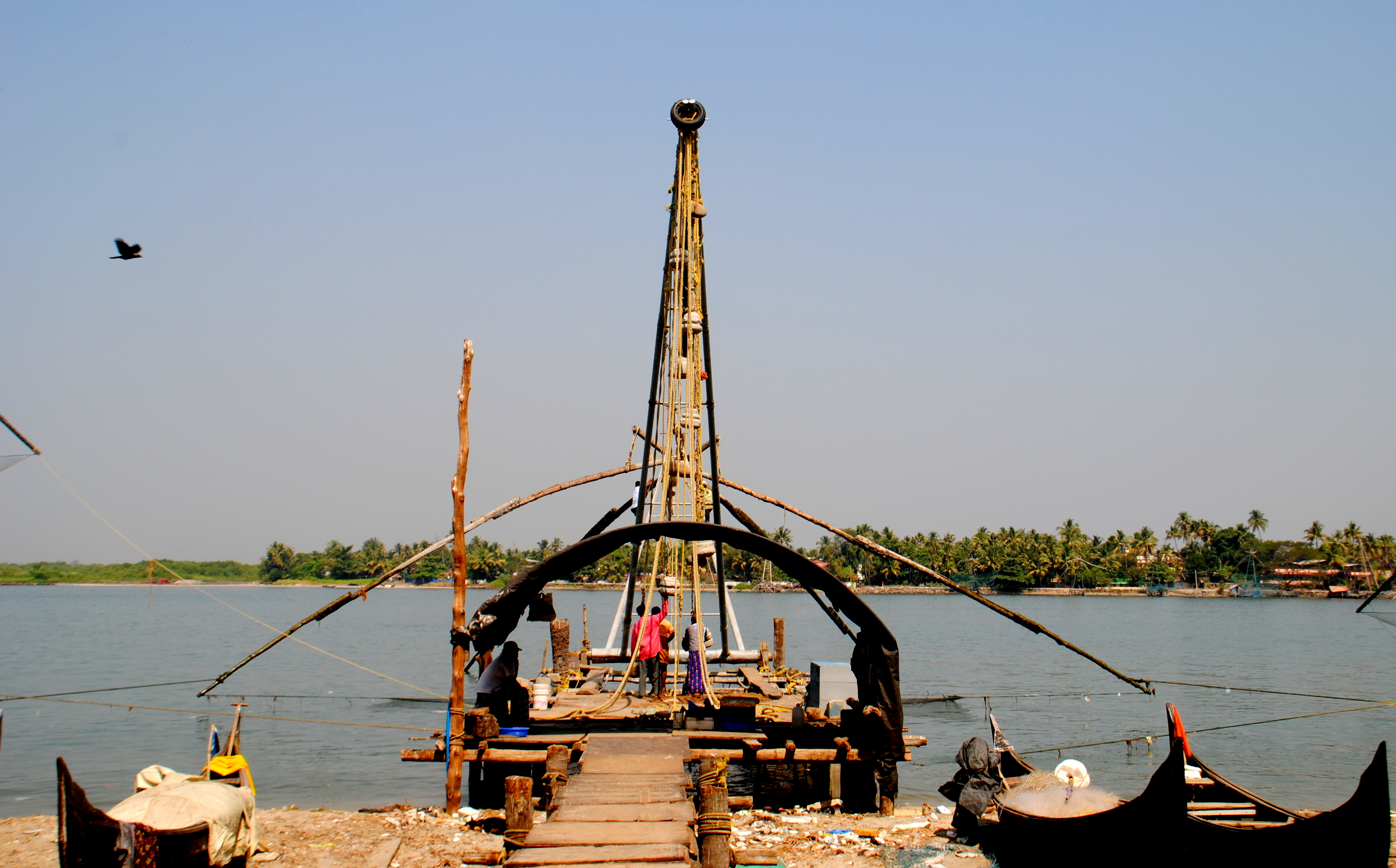
Fishing net at Fort Kochi

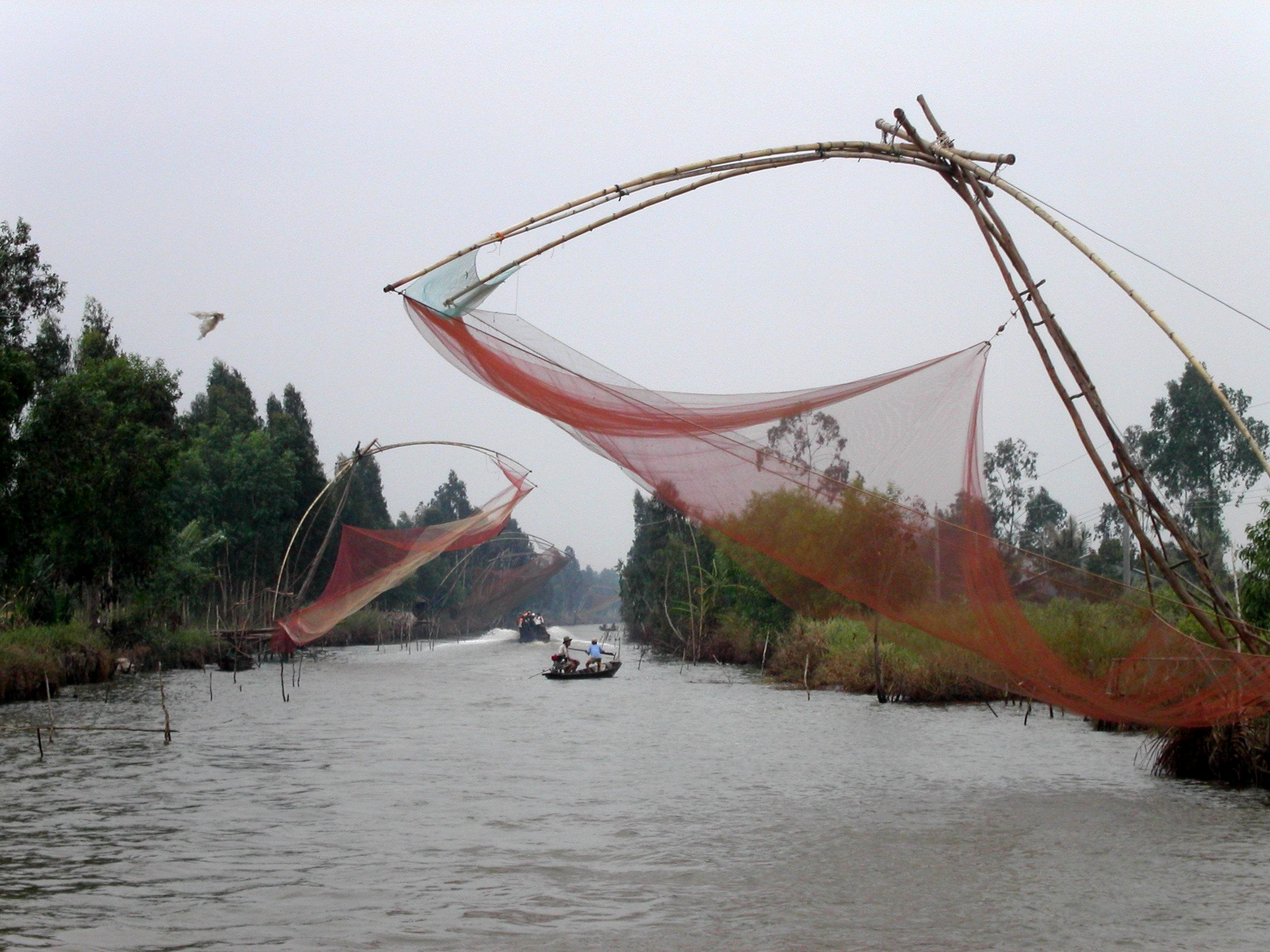
Shore based lift nets in Cà Mau, Vietnam.

Chinese fishing nets at Kochi, Kerala

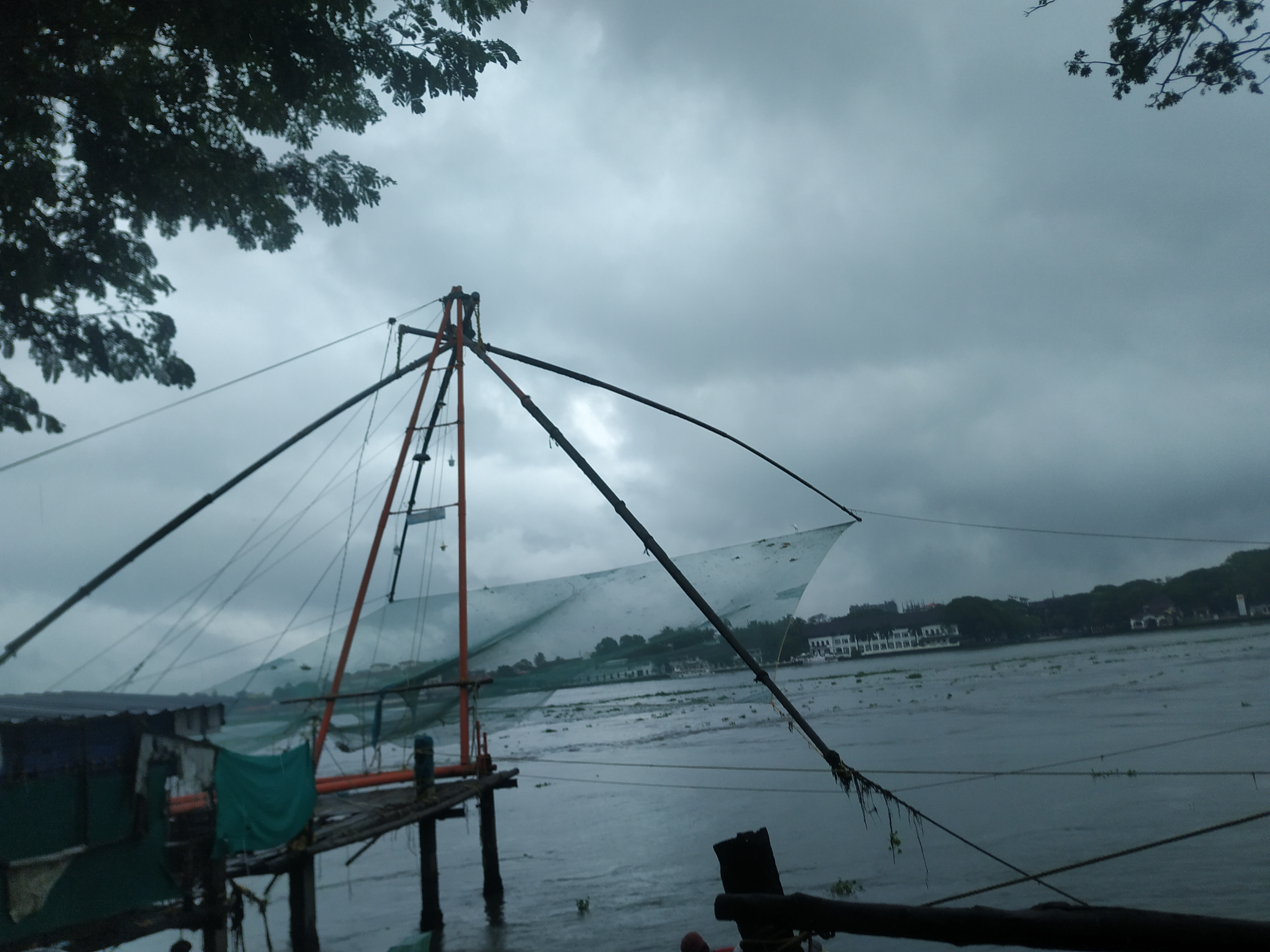
Chinese fishing net

== See also ==
- Fishing in India
