= Ezhupunna =

- village
- Location in Kerala, India Ezhupunna (India)
- Coordinates: 9°49′24″N 76°18′36″E
- Country: India
- State: Kerala
- District: Alappuzha

Government
  - Body: Ezhupunna Panchayath
- Elevation: 1–3 m (3.3–9.8 ft)

Population (2011)
  - Total: 27,528

Languages
  - Official: Malayalam, English
- Time zone: UTC+5:30 (IST)
- PIN: 688537
- Nearest city: Kochi
- Lok Sabha constituency: Alappuzha district
- Kerala Niyamasabha constituency: Aroor
- Civic agency: Panchayath

Ezhupunna is a village in the taluk of Cherthala in Alappuzha district in the Indian state of Kerala. It lies between Alappuzha and Kochi, near National Highway 66. There is also a railway station, where only passenger trains halt. This is a panchayat which come under the Aroor Assembly constituency and the Alappuzha Parliamentary constituency. The village have borders with Kumbalangi and Chellanam, suburbs of the city of Kochi.

== Economy ==
Prawn farming, pokkali rice cultivation and coconut plantation are means of livelihood. A good number of people have white collar jobs mainly in Kochi.

== Companies/Factories/Warehouses ==
- Accelerated Freeze Drying Company (AFDC).
- Amalgam Nutrients and Feeds Ltd.
- Innovative Foods Ltd.
- Snowman Frozen Foods Ltd.

== Schools ==
The first high school in Ezhupunna is St Raphel's High School. One of the main schools in the village is Nair Samajam Lower Primary School, St Mary's L.P school near Vadakakath Church, Ezhupunna North and Amala Public School.

== Demographics ==
As of 2011 India census, Ezhupunna had a population of 27528 with 13478 males and 14050 females.
