= Pattanakkad =

- village
- Location within Kerala Location within India
- Coordinates: 9°43′43″N 76°19′08″E
- Country: India
- State: Kerala
- District: Alappuzha

Population (2011)
  - Total: 31,629

Languages
  - Official: Malayalam, English
- Time zone: UTC+5:30 (IST)
- PIN: 688531
- Vehicle registration: kl32
- Nearest city: cherthala
- Lok Sabha constituency: Alappuzha
- Vidhan Sabha constituency: cherthala

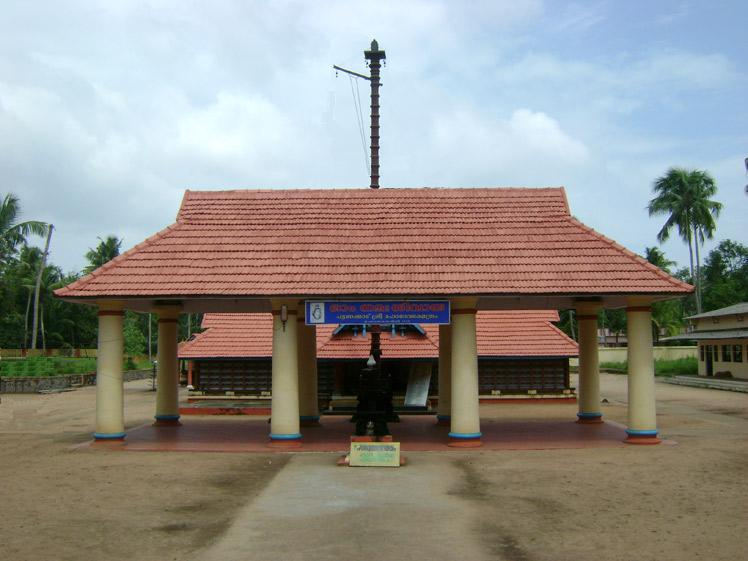
Pattanakkad temple

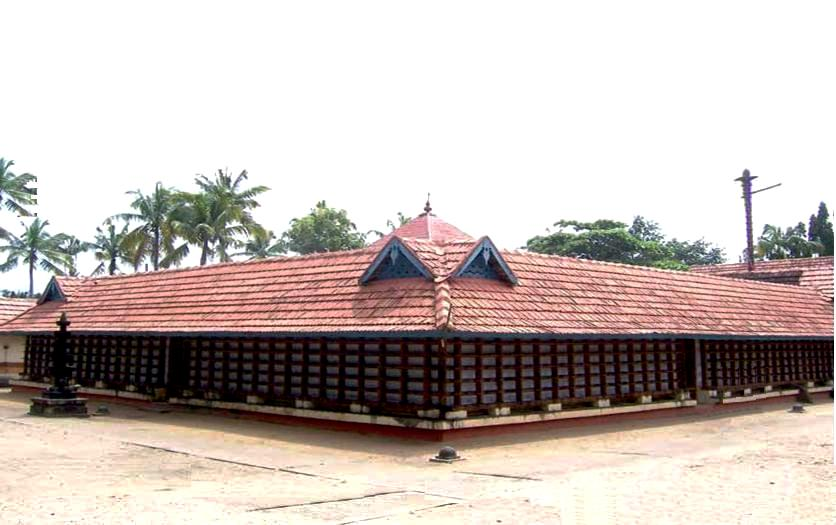
Shiva temple

Pattanakkad is a village in Alappuzha district in the Indian state of Kerala. This is a panchayat which come under the Cherthala Assembly constituency.

== Demographics ==
As of 2011 India census, Pattanakkad had a population of 31,629 with 15,550 males and 16,079 females.
