= Kumbalangi =

Island village close to Kochi in Kerala, India

- Location in Kerala, India Kumbalangi (India)
- Coordinates: 9.88°N 76.29°E
- Country: India
- State: Kerala
- District: Ernakulam

Government
  - Type: Panchayat.

Population (2011)
  - Total: 42,367

Languages
  - Official: Malayalam, English
- Time zone: UTC+5:30 (IST)
- PIN: 682007
- Vehicle registration: KL-7 / KL-43
- Nearest city: Kochi

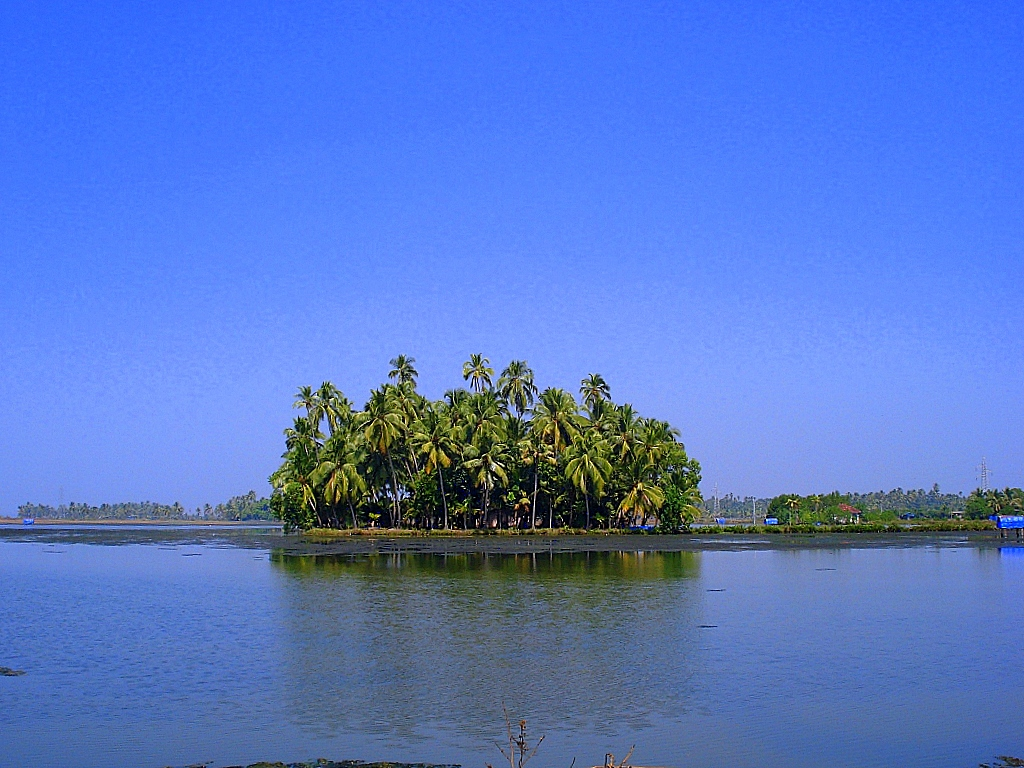
Kumbalangi village

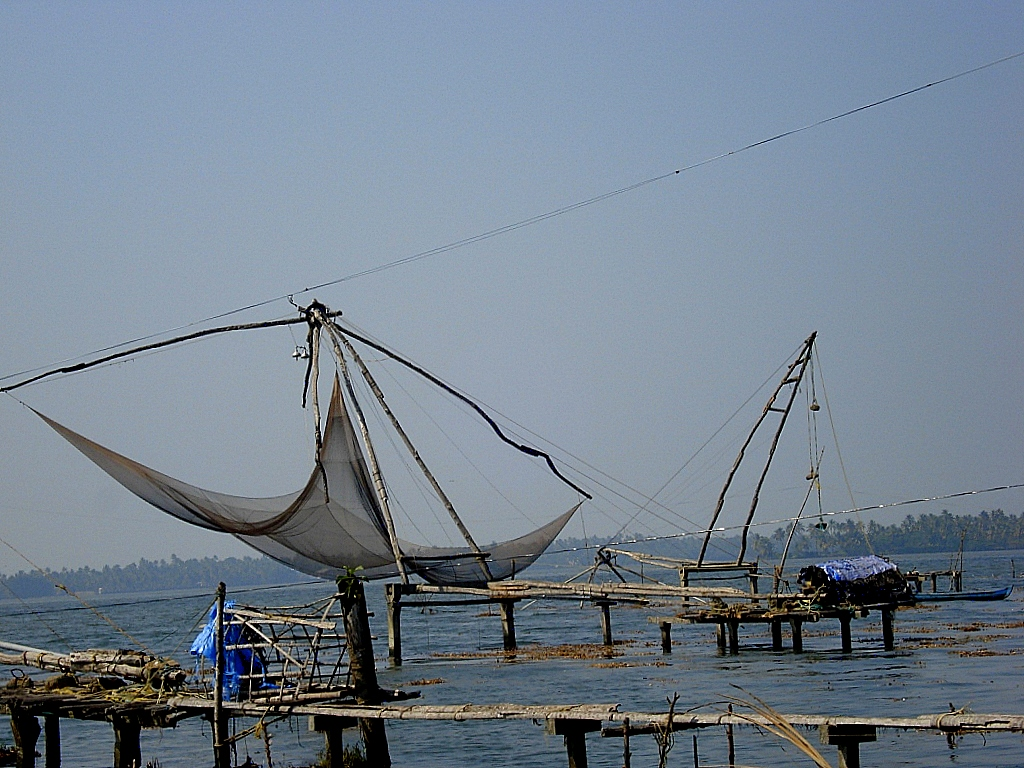
Chinese fishing nets

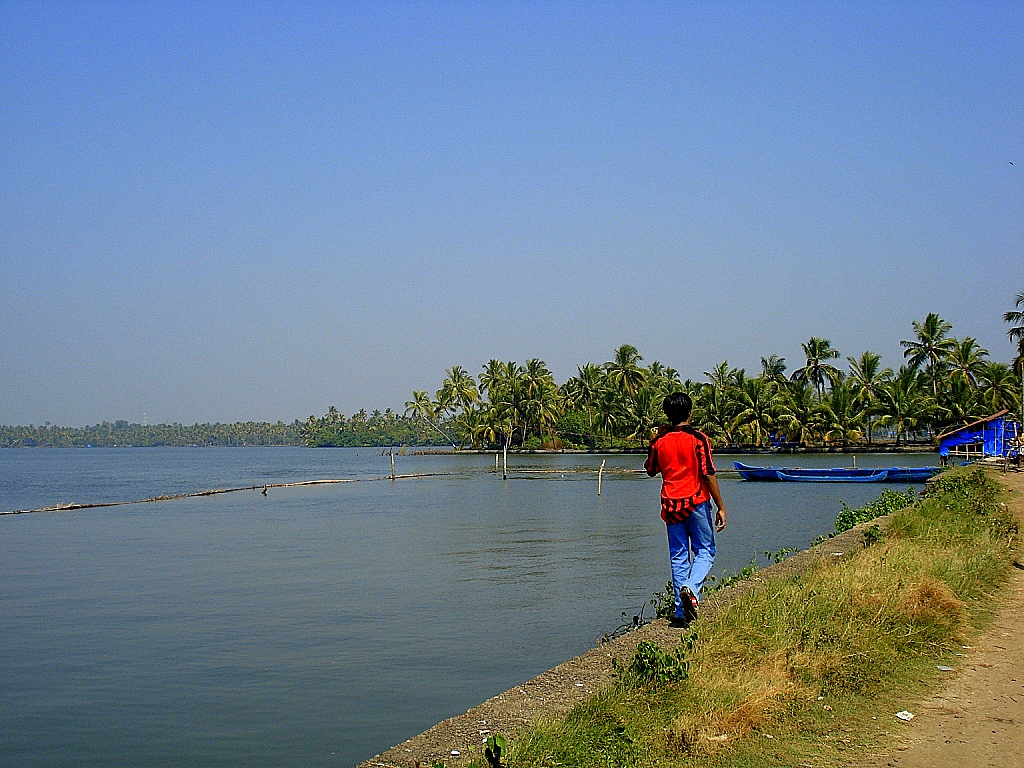
Kumbalangi walk

Kumbalangi (Malayalam: [kumbɐɭɐŋːi]) is an island village in the outskirts of Kochi city in the state of Kerala, India. Situated amidst backwaters, around 12 km (7.5 mi) from the city center, Kumbalangi is a major tourist attraction and is famous for its Chinese fishing nets. It is also known among the tourists for the occurrence of the natural phenomenon known as sea sparkle or bioluminescence in the backwaters at Kumbalangi, which is locally known as Kavaru. It is the first eco-tourism village in India, according to the government agency Kerala Tourism.

== Etymology ==
The place was called "Kumbalam Vilangi" as it was an island which formed between Kumbalam and the sea, which simplified to Kumbalangi. It is unrelated to the ash gourd word Kumbalanga.

== Location and geography ==
Kumbalangi island is 16 km^{2} in area. It is situated around 15 km from the Ernakulam Junction Railway Station and around 40 km from the Kochi International Airport.

== Population and economy ==
Over 42,000 people live in the village. According to the Census 2011, majority of the people are Latin Catholic Christians who constitute 75% of the population, and also has a 95.88% literacy rate.

The main occupation in Kumbalangi is fishing, and there are over 100 Chinese nets in the backwaters that face the village. Groves of mangroves separate the land from the water, providing a breeding ground for prawns, crabs, oysters and small fishes. It is home to fishermen, farmers, labourers, toddy tappers and coir spinners.

An occupation which has seen quite a revival is that of boatmen. The village is well connected by road to the mainland, and the local community did not patronize them very much. However, tourists are keen on cruises. Fisher folk and boatmen also demonstrate various fishing techniques for the tourists.

== Model tourism village ==
In 2003 the Kerala government selected several villages as model villages. The Kumbalangi Integrated Tourism Village project is meant to transform the tiny island into a model fishing village and tourism spot. The panchayat (village council), with financial assistance from the state government, is implementing the project.

"The Kumbalangi project was set in motion in 2003 to help the local people, the economy and the locality through tourism," says M C Sivadathan, President of the Kumbalangi panchayat. "And in order to achieve this, we have done away with many concepts typical of tourism elsewhere. Our idea is to create job opportunities for the villagers, while also ensuring that tourists have a good time seeing and experiencing real village life," he explains.

Currently, ten houses offer rooms to visitors. This facility is generally within a residence, where two or more rooms with attached baths are set aside for guests. The tourists sit with the host family and eat the same food. They can walk through the village, watch fishermen at work, fish themselves, go canoeing and visit the farms. Tourists also find that there is no huge communication gap, because at least one member in a family, if not all, can converse in English.

=== Artists' village ===
Under the Kumbalangi project, Kalagraamam, an artists' village, is also being set up. The initial plans were to erect a cottage in the middle of the backwaters. Later, the panchayat members, tourism secretary and the tourism minister all agreed that this would disturb the backwaters ecology. Kalagraamam, therefore, will now stand on four acres of land inside Kumbalangi. It will showcase the traditional fishing equipment and handicrafts of the region.

=== Infrastructure ===
The Kumbalangi panchayat is aware that being a tourist destination also brings with it greater responsibilities.

"Tourists will not come unless there are proper roads and lights. So, the roads and canals have been strengthened, CFC lamps have been installed, and 600 biogas plants have been set up for waste management. Kumbalangi is also the first panchayat in the state to set up such a waste management system. A park has also been constructed for visitors to relax in. The most remarkable thing about this project is that what we do for the tourists also directly benefits the local population," Sivadathan says.

=== Schools ===
Schools in Kumbalangi include:

- St Peter's Higher Secondary School
- Our Lady of Fatima Higher Secondary School
- St Anne's Public School
- Government UP School
- St George's UP School
- Illikkal VPY LP School
- St Joseph's LP School

== Thirutha Fish from Kumbalangi ==
Thirutha fish from Kumbalangi Lake is very famous. Former Union Minister K. V. Thomas used to cook fish curry of thirutha fish and send it to Sonia Gandhi for positions in party and cabinet.

== In popular culture and kavaru ==
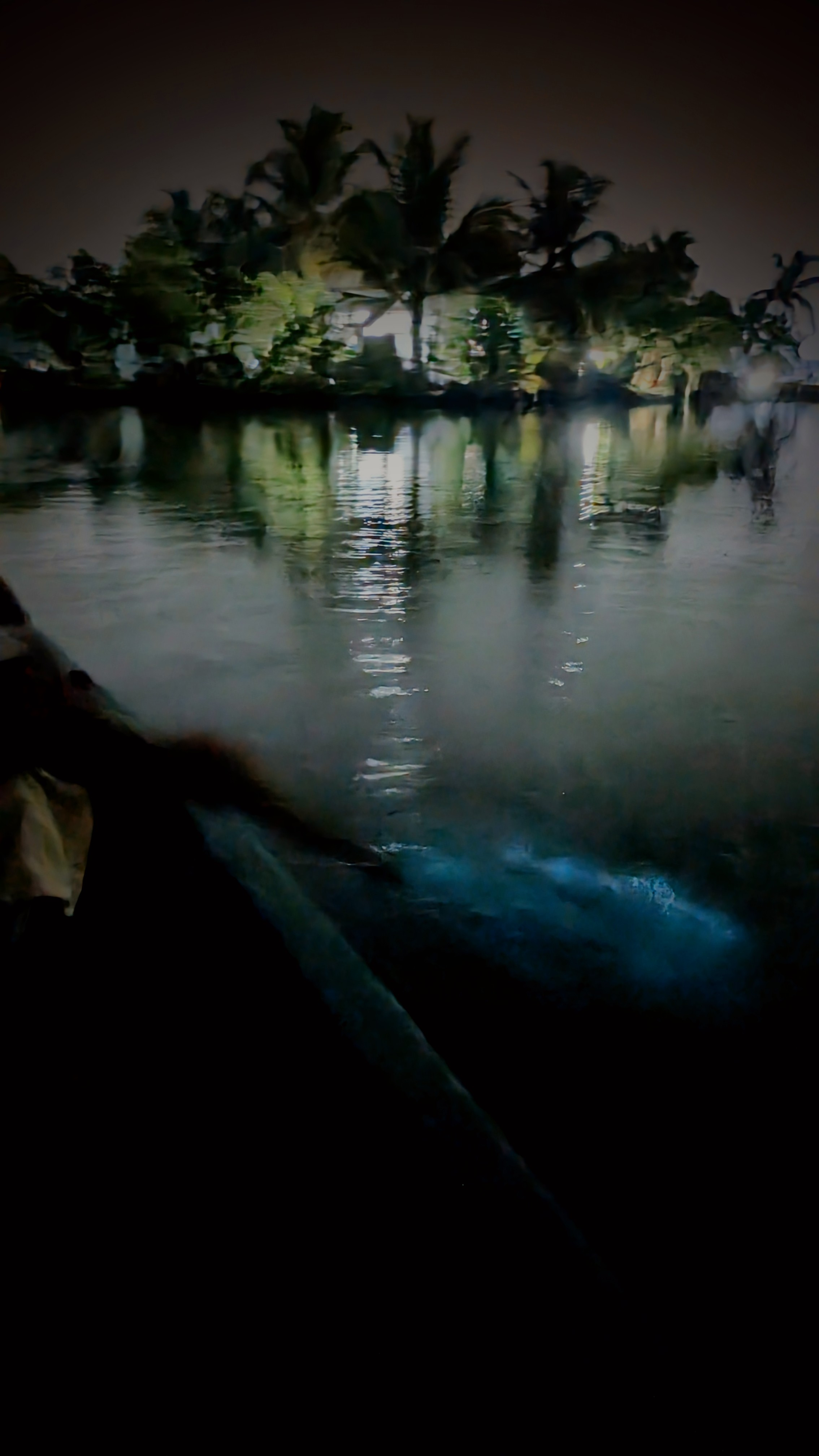
Kavaru (bioluminescence) at Kumbalangi, 2026

The 2019 state award winning Malayalam-language movie Kumbalangi Nights is set here. After the release of the movie, Kumbalangi became more known to tourists because of the depiction of sea sparkle (Kavaru) phenomenon at backwaters of Kumbalangi in the movie. Sea sparkle can be witnessed along the backwaters during March-April. As the wind creates ripples on the waters, the phenomenon becomes more visible. The sight is more alluring on moonlit nights.
