= Chellanam =

- village
- Location in Kerala, India
- Coordinates: 9.8072100°N 76.277420°E
- Country: India
- State: Kerala
- District: Ernakulam

Population (2011)
  - Total: 14,928

Languages
  - Official: Malayalam, English
- Time zone: UTC+5:30 (IST)
- Vehicle registration: KL- 43
- 2011 census code: 627997

Chellanam is a village located in Kochi city in the Indian state of Kerala.

== History ==
Chellanam formed the southern border of the pre-colonial Kingdom of Cochin.

In 1510, Goa was captured by the Portuguese general Alfonso Albuquerque from the Adil Shah dynasty of Bijapur, and Portuguese rule was established. The Kudumbis, along with Gouda Saraswat Brahmins (Malayalam: ഗൌഡ് സാരസ്വത്), Daivajnas and Vaishya Vanis who wanted to preserve their religious and cultural identity, migrated from Goa along the west coast of India, primarily through sea voyages.

Some of the groups that fled Goa landed in coastal districts of state of Karnataka, that is, the Uttara Kannada, Dakshina Kannada and Udupi districts, and some groups voyaged further to Kerala. One of these first exodus groups landed on the island of Cherai, Kerala. They slowly migrated southwards from Ernakulam and settled in coastal areas. They were experts in paddy cultivation, especially in the low-lying fields of the Kerala backwaters, and they pioneered cultivation of the well-known "Chettiverippu" strain of paddy rice, brought from Konkan.

A group of Kudumbis may have migrated to Chellanam at the invitation of a Maharaja and on arrival been given (free of tax) a coconut garden and land to grow rice. In return they were required to supply Avil to the palace and temple free of cost.

The main agricultural laborers of Chellanam have been from the Pulaya and Kudumbi castes. It is also observed that during the Portuguese period, a lot of people converted to Christianity.

On 24 May 2010 residents of Maruvakad, staying near Thiruhridaya Chapel, just 100 meters from Velankanni Matha Pilgrim Center; dug an old well which is to be believed that, it was built and used by Dutch Army around 200 years ago.

This will help and will be a new resource for drinking water. Water is the most precious element for the people of Chellanam.

The Maharaja of Kochi had a marine fleet which had a captain named Thobias Cappithan. When he won a battle he was presented with a piece of land called "Chellavanam". It was a vanam (forest) that was not inhabited normally at that time, but he settled there with his family. He had four sons; one stayed near a banyan tree (aal maram) and became known as Alumkal family, another stayed at Valiyaparambu and became Valyaparambu family, the son who stayed near "Kalam" became Kalathumkal family and another near a statue of Holy Cross and later his descendants came to be known as Kurisingal family.

Chellavanam now is called Chellanam.

== Geography ==
Chellanam is on a narrow landform about 10 km in length, starting from St. George Church at the southern end at the northern border of Pallithode village and Kattiparambu (near Thoppumpady). At the northern end it has a width of 250 metres, accommodating in between the villages of Chellanam, Maruvkad, Chalakadavu, Kandakadavu, Puthenthodu, Kannamaly, Cheriyakadavu and Kattiparambu. The landscape is filled with bungalows and courtyards.

There was a canal (azhi) passing through this place to the sea which later closed naturally and formed in a place called Andhakaranazhi in Alappuzha district. Chellanam comes under kochi legislative assembly and Ernakulam loksabha constituency. The local self-administration body is Chellanam grama panchayath. SH 66 also called Alappuzha Arthunkal Kochi road passes through Chellanam.

Chellanam Ezhupunna Eramalloor road connects Chellanam to NH 66 at Eramalloor, a developing suburb of kochi. Eramalloor is the southernmost suburb of kochi. Ezhupunna railway station having stops for few passenger trains is located on this road and is the nearest railway station. Chellanam south Neendakara junction on SH 66 is some 4.5 km from Eramalloor jn.

The main portion of Chellanam village consists of pokkaly fields. According to the traditional practice, the fields used to be prepared for paddy cultivation from the Vishu day, falling in April every year. The land had to be dried under the hot sun for almost a month, by which time the salt content left over from the prawn farming would be ready to be washed off by the first rain of the monsoon season.

Chellanam harbour, one of the finest picturesque harbours in kochi is located at south chellanam. Chellanam harbour is one of the main fishing centres in Kochi. Government of kerala has proposed funds for the next phase development of harbour.

== Religion ==
Most of the people are Latin Catholics. The district includes Diocese of Cochin and Diocese of Alleppey. The local parishes in the Diocese of Cochin consist of St. Sebastian's Church in Chellanam, St. Antony's Church in Kannamaly, St. Joseph's Church in Cheriyakadavu and St. Francis of Assisi Church in Kattiparambu. Those in the Diocese of Alleppey are St. George's Church in Chellanam, Xavier Desh Church in South Chellanam, Littile Flower Church in Maruvakkadu and St. Francis Xavier's Church in Kandakkadavu.

Hindus belonging to communities such as Gowda Saraswatha Brahmins, Eazhava, Pulaya, Velan, Kudumbi, and Ulladan also live in Chellanam.

== Economy ==
Most of the people make their living from fishing and agriculture. Fishermen work at deep-sea and fresh-water fishing, using the latest technologies. Majority of the people does white collar jobs in kochi city. Chellanam is a developing south west suburb of kochi. Corporation bank and South Indian bank has their branches at Chellanam. Chellanam service Cooperative bank having head office at South Chellanam and a branch at Maruvakad is the service Cooperative bank in Chellanam. North Chellanam panchayath service Cooperative bank is another service Cooperative bank having its branch at Cheriyakadavu.

Educational institutions include Puthenthode Government High School, St Mary's High school at Chellanam North, St George LP School, Leo Public School, St Xavier's school at Kandakadavu, Exodus school at Maruvakad.

== Demographics ==
According to the 2011 census of India, Chellanam has 3446 households. The literacy rate of the village is 84.12%.

Demographics (2011 Census)
	Total	Male	Female
Population	14928	7434	7494
Children aged below 6 years	1572	858	714
Scheduled caste	1018	498	520
Scheduled tribe	32	16	16
Literates	12557	6242	6315
Workers (all)	5804	4477	1327
Main workers (total)	5148	4329	819
Main workers: cultivators	62	55	7
Main workers: agricultural labourers	17	13	4
Main workers: household industry workers	22	15	7
Main workers: other	5047	4246	801
Marginal workers (total)	656	148	508
Marginal workers: cultivators	17	4	13
Marginal workers: agricultural labourers	12	2	10
Marginal workers: household industry workers	10	5	5
Marginal workers: others	617	137	480
Non-workers	9124	2957	6167
