= Aroor =

Village in Alappuzha district, Kerala, India

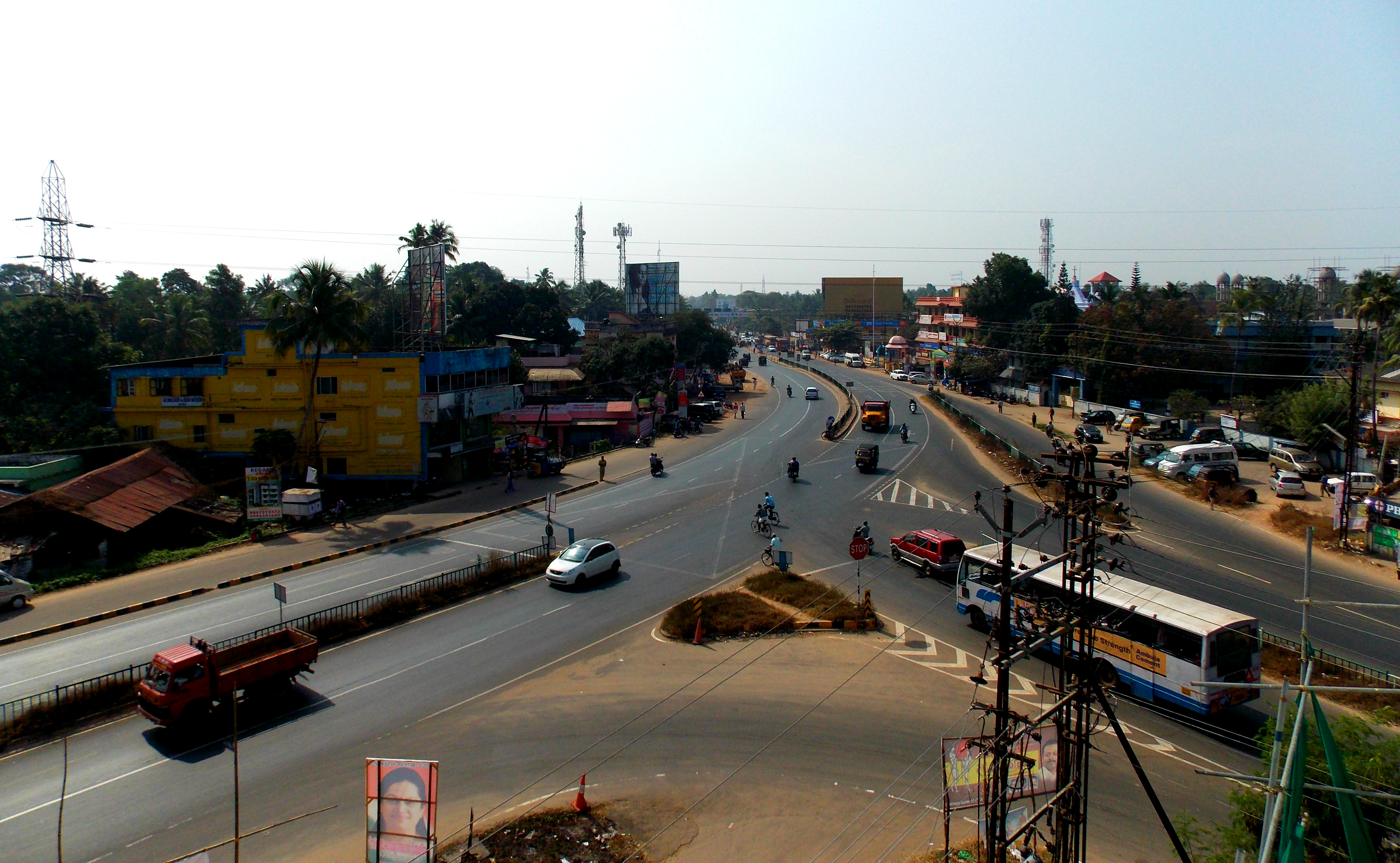
- Aroor bypass

- Location in Kerala, India Aroor (India)
- Coordinates: 9.88°N 76.3°E
- Country: India
- State: Kerala
- District: Alappuzha

Area
  - Total: 15.15 km^{2} (5.85 sq mi)

Population (2011)
  - Total: 39,214
  - Density: 2,588/km^{2} (6,704/sq mi)
- Time zone: UTC+5:30 (IST)
- PIN: 688534
- Telephone code: 0478
- Vehicle registration: KL-32
- Lok Sabha constituency: Alappuzha
- Niyamasabha constituency: Aroor

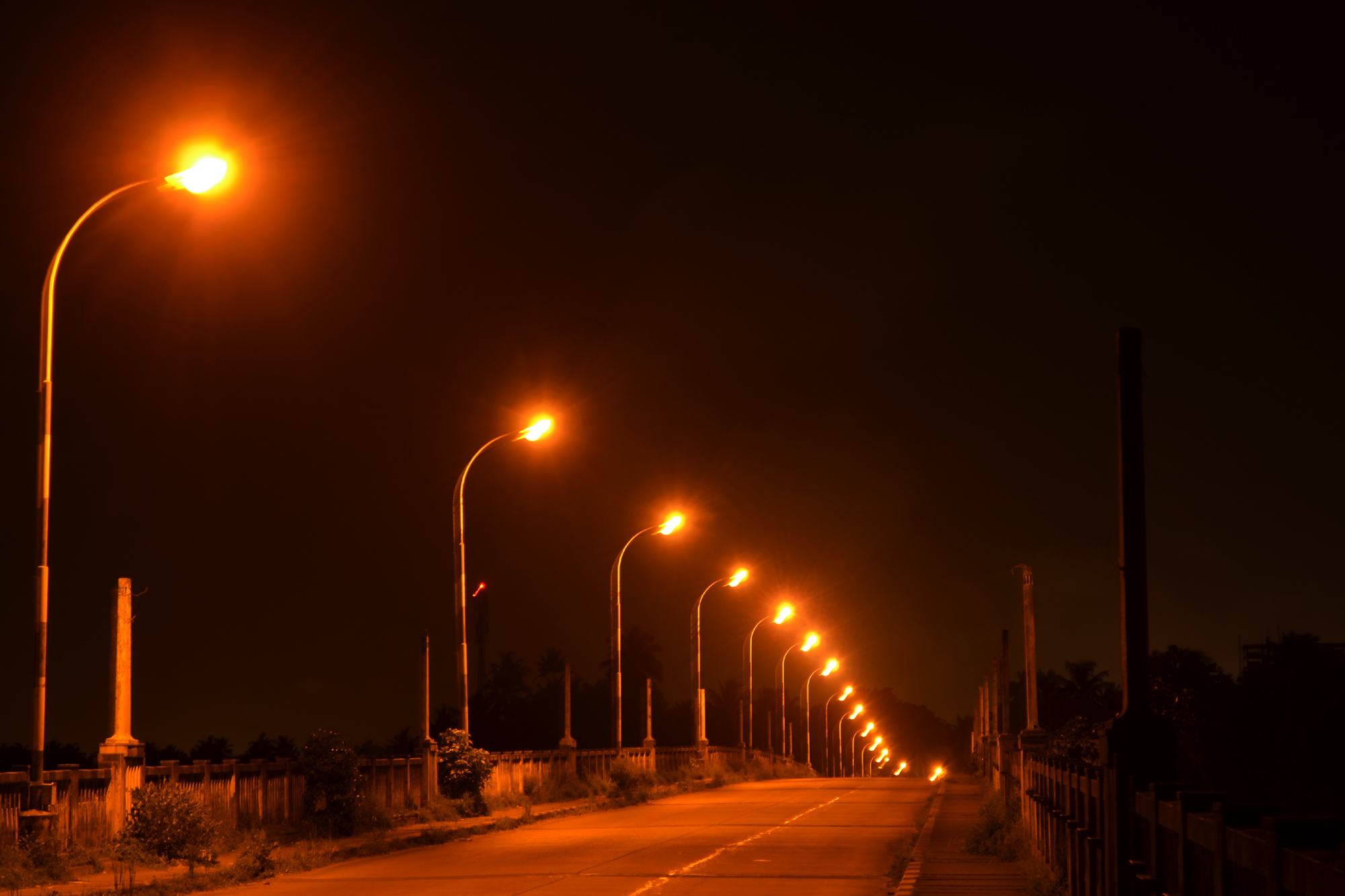
Aroor-Edakochi bridge, a night view

Aroor is a fishing village on the northernmost part of the Alappuzha district, within Cherthala taluk of Kerala, India. It serves as a gateway to Kochi from Alappuzha. Aroor, surrounded by Vembanad, Kaithappuzha, and Kumbalangi backwaters, is known for its seafood export industry. The Aroor-Kumbalam Bridge is the second-longest bridge in Kerala.

== History ==
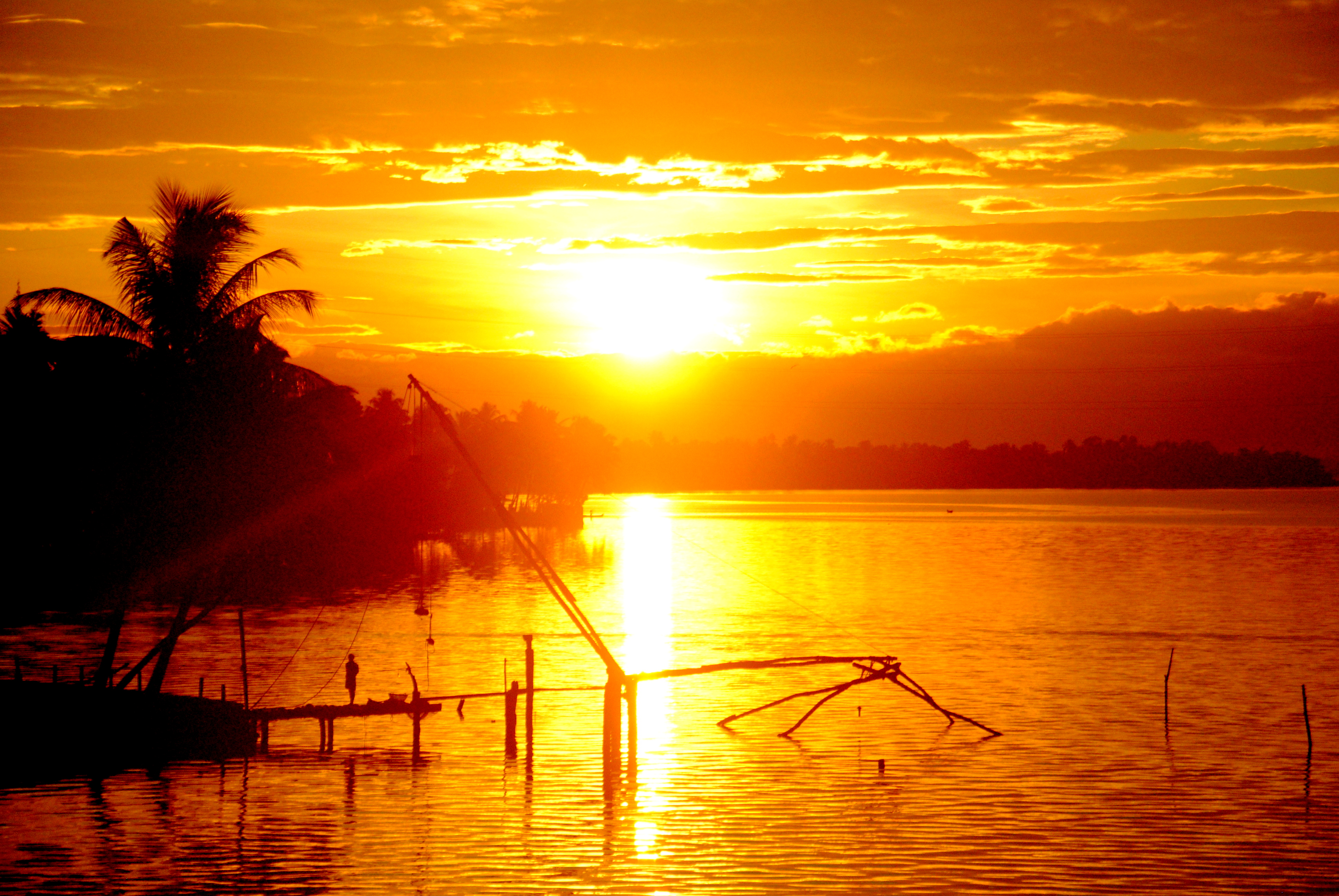
Sunrise from Aroor bridge

The name "Aroor" traces its origins to the phrase "Arayarude Oor", which means the place of Hindu fishermen, mainly the sub class Vaalarayar or Vaala, deriving their name from their unique fishing equipment, "Dragon Tailed" (Vaal in Malayalam) net used in their legal fishery. It was later shortened as "Arayaroor" and subsequently to the present version.

== Location ==
Aroor is the northernmost tip of Alappuzha district, situated in Cherthala taluk. The Aroor-Kumbalam Bridge is the second-longest bridge (now the bridge is doubled with four-lane traffic) in Kerala, spanning about 993 m. The bypass opened to traffic in 1987.

== Politics ==
Aroor assembly constituency is part of Alappuzha (Lok Sabha constituency). Aroor is known for having elected K. R. Gowri Amma for a record of eight times to the Kerala Legislative Assembly.

== Industries ==
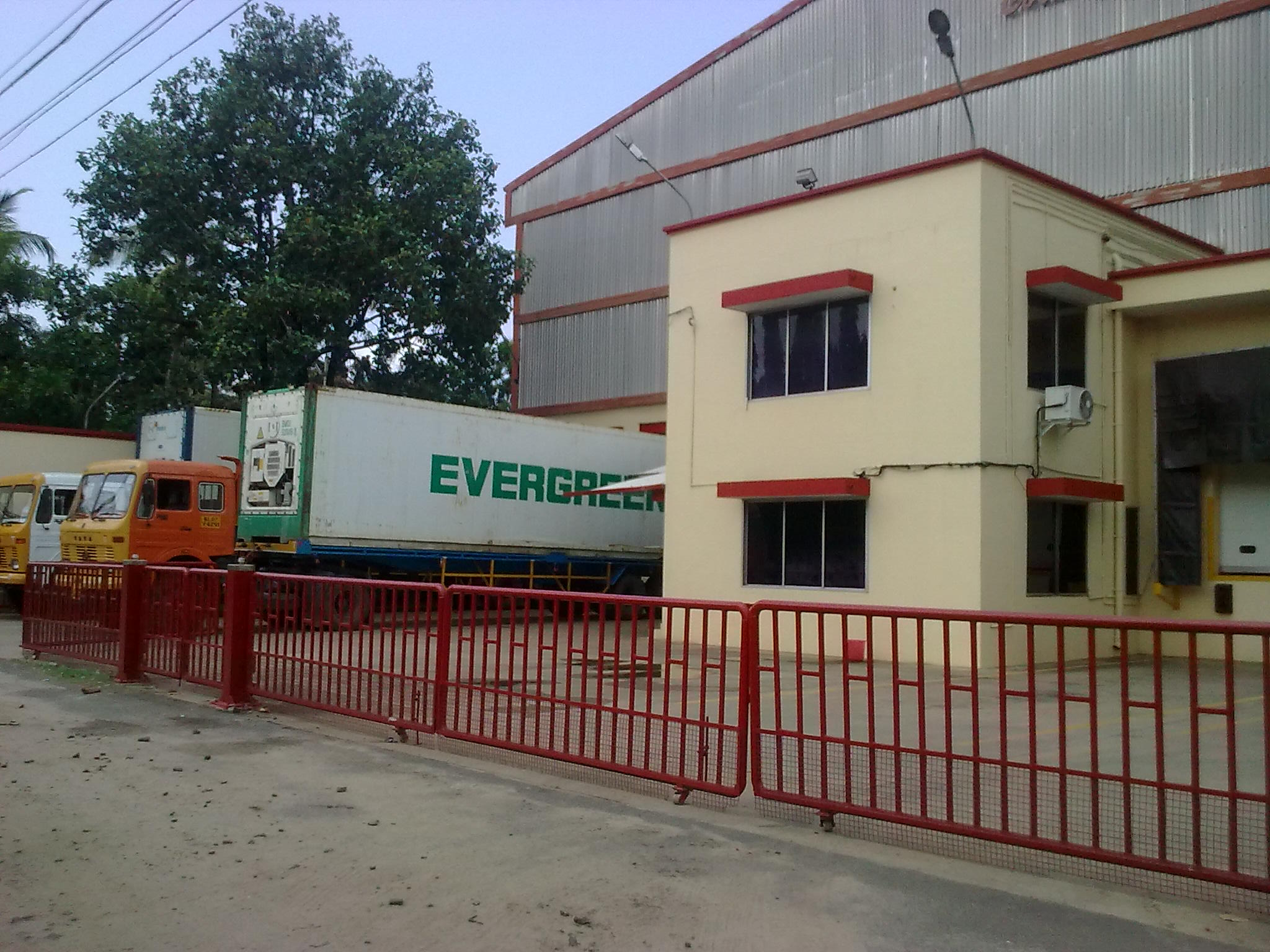
A seafood export processing plant. Aroor is known for its seafood industry.

Seafood export is a major industry of the area, given that Aroor is near Vembanad lake, a part of Kerala backwaters. This ecosystem helps large-scale prawn and shrimp farming to be an alternative to the low-lying paddy fields, which have the interlocked water system connected to the Kerala backwaters. Secondly the Cochin fishing harbour and port is just 15 km away from Aroor. The abundance of marine wealth and logistical advantages have helped the seafood export to grow, especially around Aroor. There are many marine food processing units in Aroor which provide employment to a number of people. The raw seafood catch is also purchased by large seafood export firms from North Kerala, Kollam, South Karnataka, Orissa, and Tamil Nadu, processed and preserved in cold storages, and then trans-shipped through Cochin port.

Another large business is Keltron Controls, which is the control and instrumentation division of Keltron.

== Demographics ==
As of 2011 Indian census, Aroor had a population of 39,214. Males constitute 49% of the population and females 51%. Its average literacy rate is of 84% higher than the national average of 59.5%. 11% of the population is under 6 years of age.

| Year | Male | Female | Total Population | Change | Religion (%) | | | | | | | |
| Year | Male | Female | Total Population | Change | Hindu | Muslim | Christian | Sikhs | Buddhist | Jain | Other religions and persuasions | Religion not stated |
|---|---|---|---|---|---|---|---|---|---|---|---|---|
| 2001 | 17444 | 17839 | 35283 | - | 61.70 | 12.20 | 26.05 | 0.00 | 0.02 | 0.00 | 0.01 | 0.02 |
| 2011 | 19431 | 19783 | 39214 | 11.14% | 58.81 | 14.30 | 26.75 | 0.01 | 0.01 | 0.00 | 0.02 | 0.10 |

== Prominent hospitals ==
- State Government Hospital
- ESI Dispensary
- Lakshmi Hospital
- Mercy Hospital
- Karthika Hospital
- Jeevans Hospital, Chandiroor
- Chandiroor Mission Hospital

== Religious institutions ==
Aroor Puthuvaranad Temple is a famous temple in Aroor. The idol of Kali is similar to the Kali idol of Dakshineswar, Kolkata. Aroor Karthyayani Temple is another main temple in Aroor. The name "Aroor" is derived from this temple. It is on the National Highway. Arookutty road starts from the Aroor junction. Aroor Cheruvally Temple and the Kavu with the temple, known as Paradevatha Kavu and Kizhakkedathu Kavu are scenic attractions in the temple. The banyan tree at the southwestern corner of the temple, and the Ganapathi idol known as the Aaltharra Ganapathi, are other attractions of the temple. The Ganapathi idol is similar to the idol of Pillayarpatti Ganapathi. Pillayar patti is a place near Karaikudi, Tamil Nadu. Kottilakkattu Kudumpa Paradevatha is also near the Cheruvally Temple. The long Pala Maram of the Devasthanam is a main attraction. The Garuda Vahana Ezhunnalleth and Thadi Thullal are the main attractions in the festival.

St. Augustine's Church under Diocese of Cochin is a major attraction, on the highway in the heart of Aroor. The parish is also the part of Mundamveli Parish and separated in the early 1900s. The current church, over 138 years old, was built on land donated by the Aelavanthara family.
