= Thuravoor, Cherthala =

Thuravoor
- Village
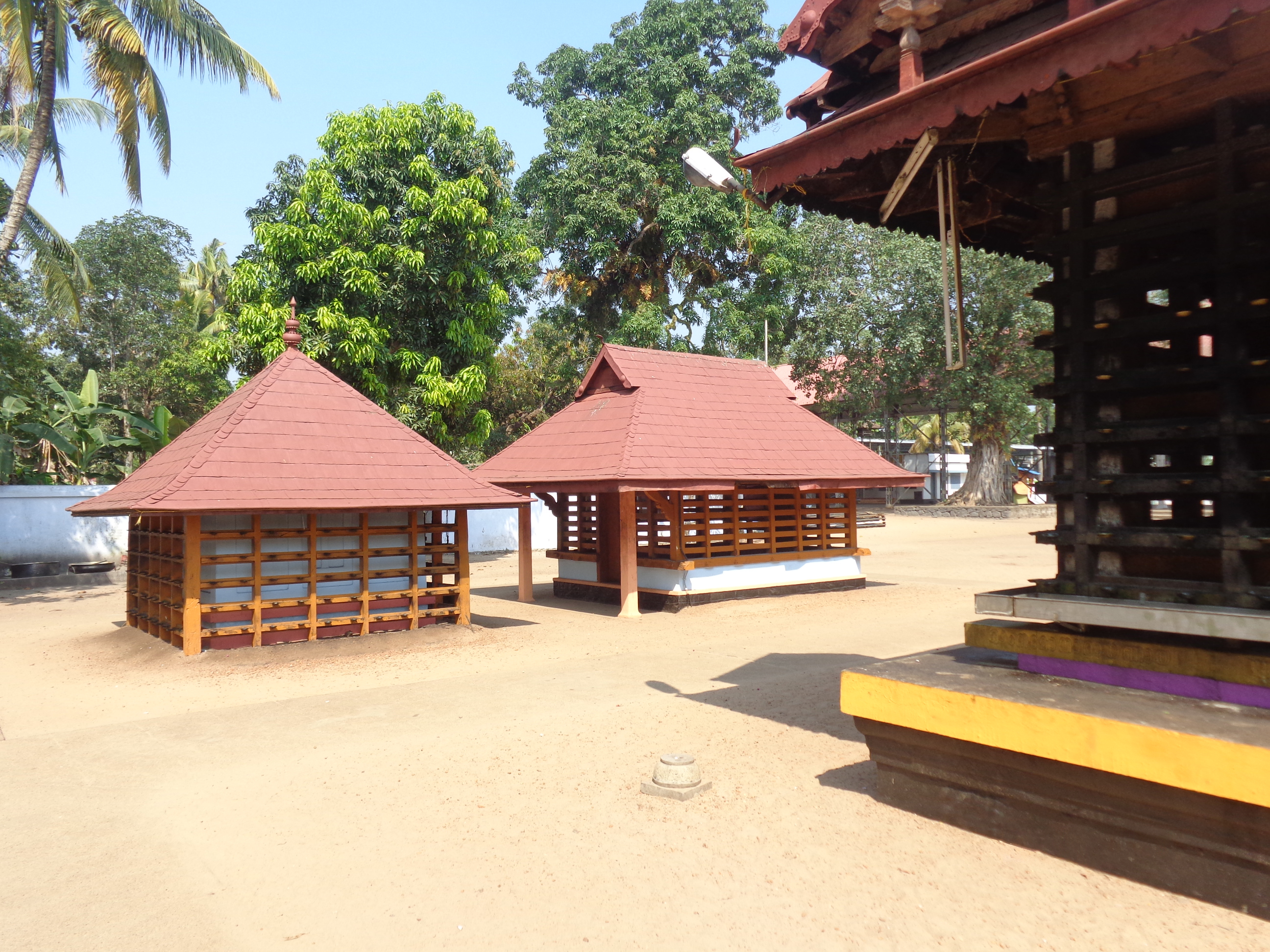
- Thuravoor Temple
- Interactive map of Thuravoor
- Coordinates: 9.77°N 76.31°E
- Country: India
- State: Kerala
- District: Alappuzha

Government
  - Body: Gram Panchayat

Languages
  - Official: Malayalam, English
- Time zone: UTC+5:30 (IST)
- PIN: 688532
- Telephone code: 0478
- Vehicle registration: KL-32 or KL-07
- Nearest city: Kochi
- Lok Sabha constituency: Alappuzha
- Niyamasabha constituency: Aroor
- Civic agency: Gram Panchayat

Thuravoor (IPA: [t̪urɐʋuːr̩]) is a gram panchayat in the Pattanakkad Block of Cherthala Taluk of the Alappuzha District, State of Kerala, India. It comes under Aroor Assembly constituency.

== Notable people ==
- Professor Thuravoor Viswambharan : Sanskrit Scholar
- Syam Pushkaran: Indian scriptwriter best known for his work in Malayalam cinema
- S. Somanath: Indian aerospace engineer, chairman, ISRO. Under his chairmanship, ISRO carried out the third Indian lunar exploration mission named Chandrayaan-3.
