= Thoppumpady BOT Bridge =

Bridge in Kochi, Kerala, India

BOT Bridge
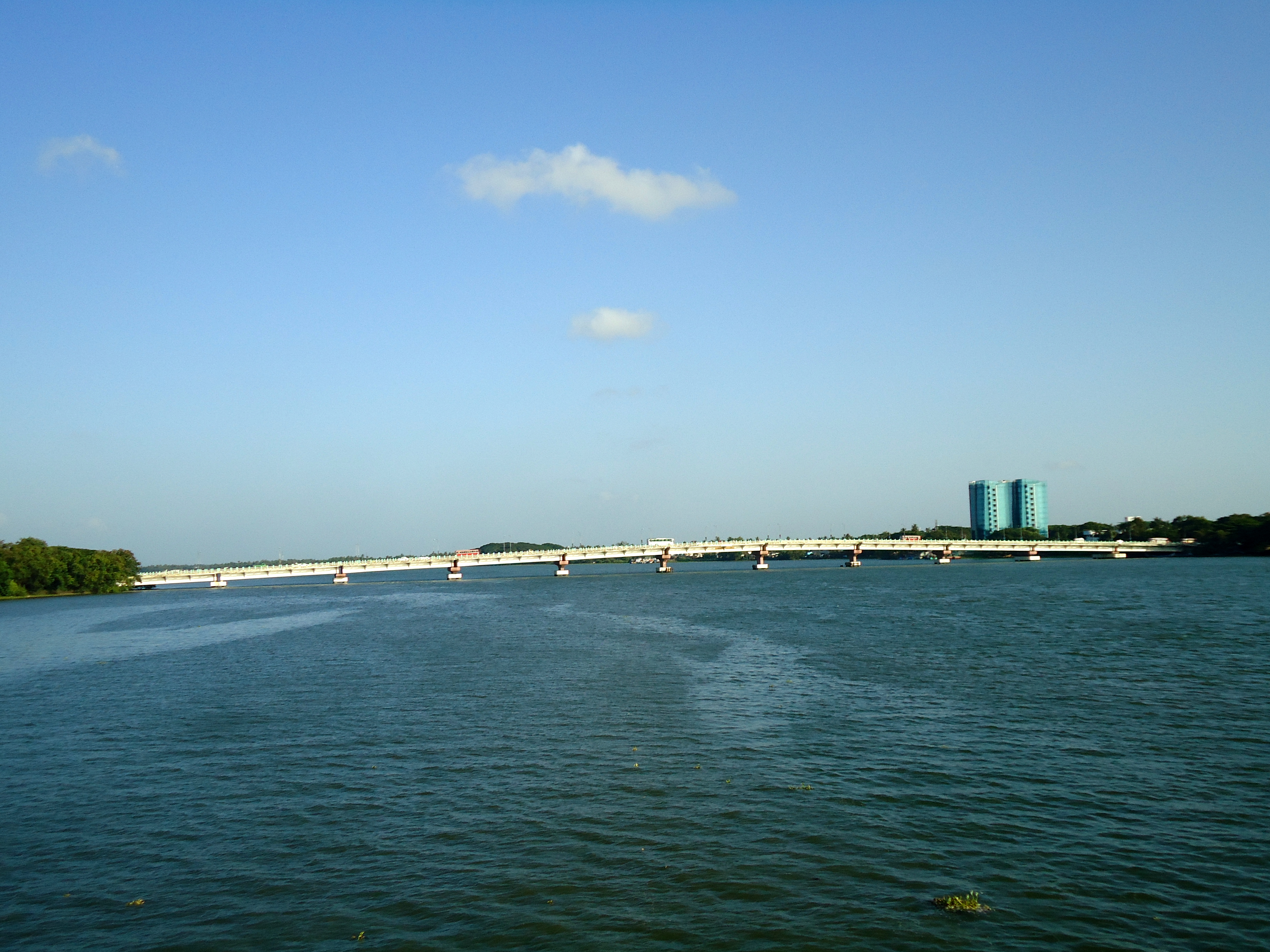
- Thoppumpady BOT Bridge
- Coordinates: 9°56′14″N 76°15′59″E

History
- Engineering design by: Gammon Infrastructure Projects Ltd
- Constructed by: Gammon Infrastructure Projects Ltd
- Construction cost: 25.80 crore
- Opened: 1998

Location
- Interactive map of BOT Bridge

Thoppumpady BOT Bridge, also known as Thoppumpady new Bridge, is a bridge in Thoppumpady, Kochi, Kerala, India. It connects the Kochi's western mainland to Willingdon Island. The new bridge was constructed in 1998; succeeding the old bridge of the same name, which is now known as the Thoppumpady Harbour Bridge, built in 1940. The old bridge, which is a landmark of Kochi is now preserved as a heritage monument and carries only two and three wheelers.

The new Thoppumpady bridge is the first Build-Operate-Transfer bridge in Kerala. It was built as a joint project of the Government of Kerala, the Greater Cochin Development Authority and Gammon India.

== History ==
As the old bridge was getting older and older, a new bridge was constructed and opened in 1998 when the old bridge was found weaker to carry heavy vehicles. Upon the arrival of the new bridge, the old bridge was partially closed and presently only four wheelers, two wheelers and light motor vehicles are allowed to cross through it. The Old Harbour Bridge is a heritage monument which is still in use.

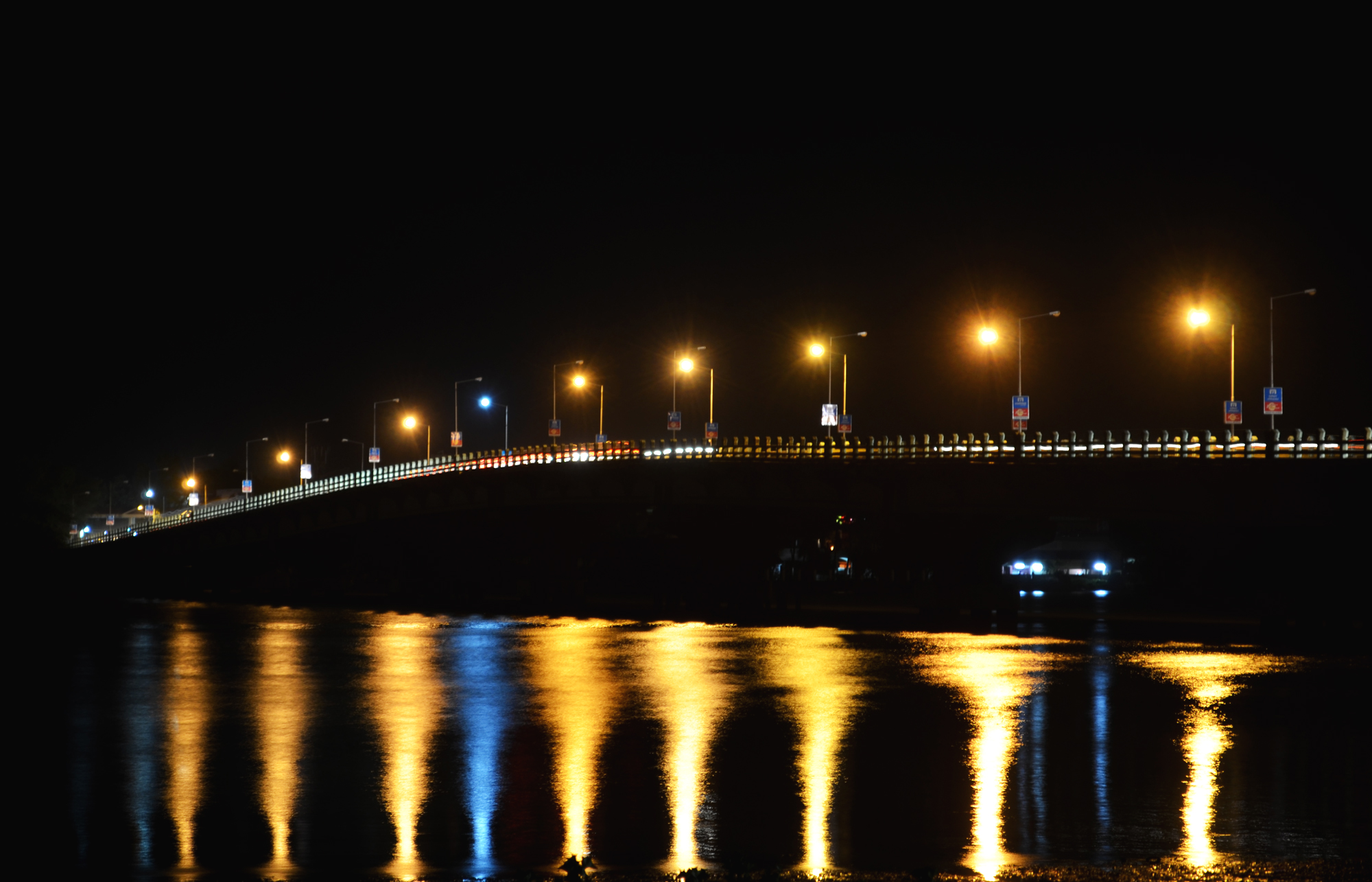
New Mattancherry Bridge at night.

== See also ==
- Venduruthy Bridge
- Goshree bridges
- History of Kochi
- Robert Bristow
