= Cochin Port Maritime Heritage Museum =

Heritage museum in Kerala

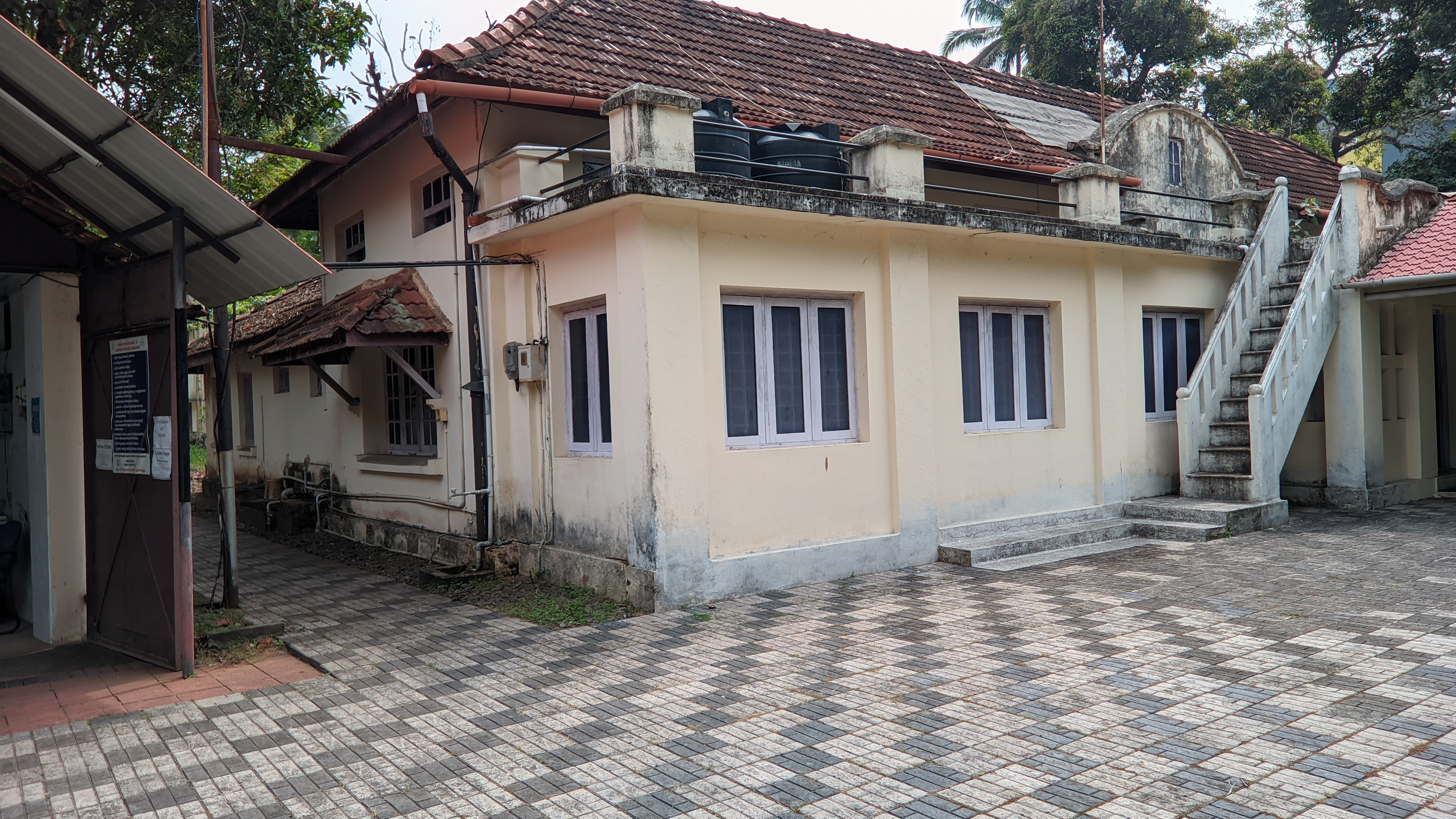
- Cochin Port Maritime Heritage Museum
- Established: May 2014
- Location: Willingdon Island, Kerala
- Coordinates: 9.96903°N 76.26086°E

The Cochin Port Maritime Heritage Museum is a museum located on Willingdon Island in Kochi, Kerala. The museum has rare collection of photographs related to the evolution of Cochin (now Kochi) as a port city. It also shows the development of Willingdon Island and Kochi's maritime heritage. Old marine equipment and rare photographs documenting Cochin Port's history can be found in the museum. The building, which was used as the chief engineer's quarters during the construction of Willingdon Island was converted into a museum by the Cochin Port Trust in May 2014.

== Overview ==
The photographs in the museum reveal the hardships faced by Sir Robert Bristow and his workforce, who developed the port amidst financial constraints and without technology support. It unveils the history of the Cochin Port during a period of 21 years starting from 1920 to 1941. Some of the photographs in the museum includes the construction of the Mattanchery bridge and wharves, the Venduruthy Rail-Road bridges, the arrival of the first train in Kochi, Sir Robert Bristow's house and car, the reclamation of the Ernakulam foreshore, the loading of the elephant that Jawaharlal Nehru gave to the Russian children and the Mattanchery shore lined with Alappuzha boats. The museum also has several maritime equipments such as maritime clocks, mechanical calculators, underwater search tools, steering units.

== See also ==
- History of Kochi
- Cochin Port
- Willingdon Island
