= Geography of Kochi =

Coordinates: 9°58′0″N 76°14′0″E

Location of Kochi in India

Kochi is a city in the Indian state of Kerala. Kochi is located in the district of Ernakulam. Today, Kochi includes the mainland Ernakulam and the islands of Fort Kochi, Mattancherry, Willingdon Island, Mulavukad, Vallarpadam, Mundamveli, Kumbalangi, Cherai and other outlying islands. For many centuries up to and during the British Raj, the city of Kochi was the seat of the eponymous princely state — the Kingdom of Cochin, which lay between 9.48° and 10.50° latitude and 76.5° and 76.58° E longitude.

== Location ==
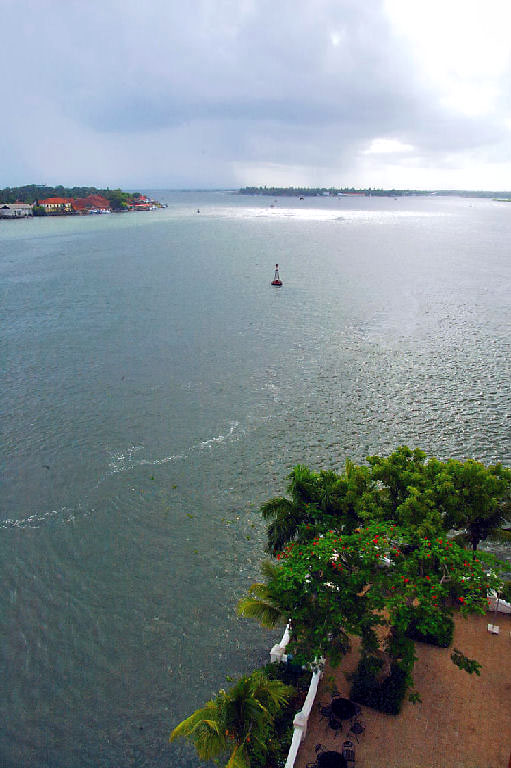
A view of the Kochi harbour mouth from Willingdon Island

Kochi is located on the southwest coast of India, in the southern state of Kerala. The city lies at the sea mouth of seven major rivers which start from the Western Ghats and travel through Kerala's midlands, lowlands and coastal areas, to drain out into the Arabian Sea. Earlier, Kochi was used to refer to the region encompassing Mattancherry, Fort Kochi, Mundamveli and Thoppumpadi. Today, Kochi comprises the mainland Ernakulam, old Kochi, Kadavanthra, the suburbs of Edapally and the exurbia of Kalamassery and Kakkanad to the northeast; Tripunithura to the south east; and a group of islands closely scattered in the Vembanad lake. It is known as the Queen of Arabian Sea as it has the natural harbor on the Arabian Sea coast and was the centre of the world spice trade for many centuries.

== Islands of Kochi ==
Kochi includes an archipelago of various islands, from large to very small. The major islands in Kochi are :

- Fort Kochi
- Bolghatty Island
- Willingdon Island
- Vypin
- Ramanthuruthu
- Vallarpadam
- Kumbalam
- Cherai
- Kumbalangi
- Gundu Island
- Pizhala

== Geographical features ==
Kochi lies at the northern end of a narrow neck of land, about 19 km long and less than 1.6 km wide in many places, and is separated from the mainland by inlets from the Arabian sea and by the estuaries of rivers draining from the Western Ghats. As a result, Kochi is a natural harbour.

Much of Kochi lies at the sea level, and the city along with the suburbs span an area of around 440 km^{2}. The city has a seacoast of about 30 miles. Willingdon Island is the largest Indian artificial island, created by dredging the Vembanad Lake under the direction of Lord Willingdon. The city has a rich network of backwaters, which has been declared as National Waterways by the Central Government.

=== Soil and rock ===
Kochi's soil consists mainly of recent sediments (Alluvium, Teri's, Brown sands etc.). Hydromorphic saline soils are also found in the areas surrounding the backwaters. The major rock types are Archaean-basic dykes, Charnockites and Gneisses.

=== Climate ===
Month	Temp(°C)	Rain(cm)	Wind(km/h)	Dew Point(°C)
Jan	24	0.9	12	20
Feb	28	1	12	22
Mar	28	1.9	23	14
Apr	29	5.1	24	14
May	28	12.5	25	14
Jun	26	22.3	24	12
Jul	26	20.6	23	12
Aug	26	13.4	23	12
Sep	27	9.8	23	12
Oct	27	12.5	23	9
Nov	27	6.3	23	9
Dec	27	1.9	21	9

Note: Values given are the average over each month.

Kochi's climate is generally tropical, with no harsh extremities. Under Köppen's climate classification, the city features a tropical monsoon climate. Surface temperatures range between 20–35 °C (68–95 °F). The current record high temperature is 38 °C; the lowest is 17 °C. Heavy rains accompanied by thunder are common from June to September due to the South-West monsoon. Light showers are experienced from October to December due to the North-West monsoon. The average annual rainfall is about 350 cm with an average 132 rainy days annually; the bulk of the rainfall stems from the South-West monsoon. The winds are moderate, with slight increase during summer and the monsoon seasons.

=== Flora and fauna ===
The flora of the region is predominantly tropical. Common vegetation in the region include Launaea, Ipomoea, Portulaca, Hydrocotyle, Spinifex, Lippia, Moniera, Cynodon, Digitaria, Cyperus etc. Mangroove formations are also common. Though much of the city is urbanised, the city retains an ecologically sensitive area right at its centre — the Mangalavanam. Mangalavanam is a nesting ground for a vast variety of migratory birds and supports many varieties of mangroves. This rare ecosystem in the heart of the city has helped mitigate Kochi's pollution problems. The Mangalavanam is also a protected bird sanctuary.

The backwaters also harbour many different types of fishes. Aquatic mammals like dolphins are aplenty in the backwaters of Kochi.
