= INS Venduruthy =

Naval base in Kerala, India

Coordinates: 9°57′11.56″N 76°16′42.57″E

- Willingdon Island, Kochi, Kerala, India, 682004
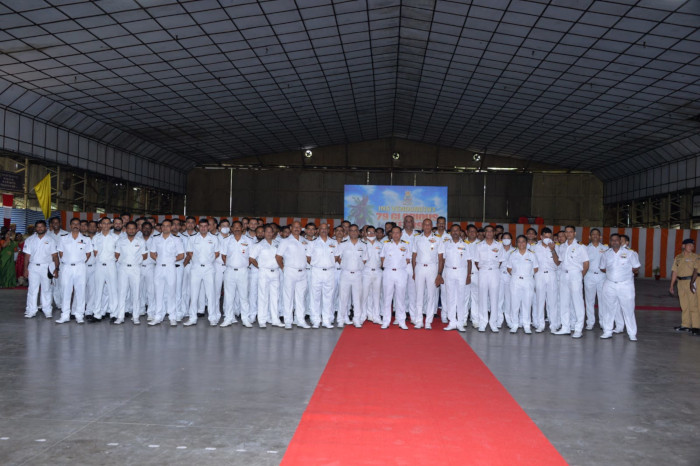
- On its 79th anniversary in 2022

Site information
- Type: Naval station
- Owner: Indian Navy
- Controlled by: Government of India

Site history
- Built: 23 June 1943 (commissioned)
- In use: 1943–present

Garrison information
- Current commander: Commodore V. Z. Job
- Occupants: Southern Naval Command

INS Venduruthy is a naval base of the Indian Navy, located on Willingdon Island in Kerala, India. It serves as the headquarters of the Southern Naval Command. It is the largest training establishment of the Indian Navy. INS Garuda is a naval air station located inside INS Venduruthy.

Commodore V. Z. Job is the commanding officer of this base. It provides administrative facilities to all training establishments inside the Southern Naval Command.

== History ==
Willingdon Island was reclaimed from Kochi Lake to aid the construction of the Port of Kochi in 1936. A small naval unit was set up at the location just two days prior to the outbreak of World War II. During the war, the rudimentary air strip near the port was transferred to the Royal Air Force in 1941. On 23 June 1943, the facilities were transferred to the Royal Navy. With the ongoing war, the base quickly expanded to become the headquarters of the Royal Navy in South India.

In 1946, after the end of the war, the base was deserted and transferred to the Royal Indian Navy which maintained a small establishment of about 20 officers and 130 enlisted men. The name of the establishment was changed from HMS Chinkara to HMIS Venduruthy after the name of the original Venduruthy island. On 26 January 1950, when India became a Republic, the name was changed to INS Venduruthy.

Following the partition of India, the navy lost three major training establishments which were located in the Dominion of Pakistan. INS Venduruthy was chosen as the location to replace these.

== Facilities ==
INS Venduruthy currently hosts the Seamanship School, which imparts training to executive officers and sailors of the Indian Navy and several friendly foreign naval forces. The establishment caters to the logistic needs of the services, civilian personnel and naval units based in Kochi as well as at Ezhimala, Wellington, Bengaluru and the Lakshadweep Islands besides the naval NCC units.

It also hosts the Diving School, Navigation & Direction (ND) School, Anti-submarine warfare (ASW) School, Signal School, Centre for Leadership and Behavioural Studies (CLABS) and NIETT.

== See also ==
Indian navy

- List of Indian Navy bases
- List of active Indian Navy ships

Integrated commands and units

- Armed Forces Special Operations Division
- Defence Cyber Agency
- Integrated Defence Staff
- Integrated Space Cell
- Indian Nuclear Command Authority
- Indian Armed Forces
- Special Forces of India

Other lists

- Strategic Forces Command
- List of Indian Air Force stations
- List of Indian Navy bases
- India's overseas military bases
