= Vathuruthy =

Vathuruthy is a densely populated residential locality situated on Willingdon Island in Kochi in the Indian state of Kerala.

Vathuruthy is referred to as Kochi's Mini Tamil Nadu as this place historically had the city’s largest Tamil migrant settlement. Most families migrated in the 1960s to build the modern Cochin Port and the surrounding urban infrastructure.

== History ==
The name Vathuruthy originated from "val-thuruthy" (meaning "tail island"), pointing to its geographic position at the edge of reclaimed land (Wellington Island). The neighborhood has a distinct cultural flavor where Tamil is widely spoken and its traditions are followed.

Before the international airport moved to Nedumbassery (now Cochin International Airport (CIAL)), commercial flights operated out of the adjacent naval air station near Vathuruthy.

== Challenges ==
The low lying geography of the area makes it prone to tidal flooding and waterlogging through the drainage canals. Vathuruthy Railway Level Crossing is a major bottleneck. It connects the mainland to Mattancherry and Fort Kochi. Closure of the gate leads to severe traffic gridlocks.
