= Shoba Annamma Eapen =

Indian judge (born 1967)

Additional Judge of Kerala High Court

Personal details
- Born: January 19, 1967 (age 59) Thoppumpady, Ernakulam, Kerala, India
- Education: Government Law College, Ernakulam
- Profession: Judge, Lawyer

Shoba Annamma Eapen (born 19 January 1967) is an Indian judge, who is serving as an Additional Judge of the Kerala High Court since May 18, 2022.

== Early life and education ==
Shoba Annamma Eapen was born on 19 January 1967 at Thoppumpady, Ernakulam District, Kerala.

She completed her schooling at Christava Mahilalayam, Aluva, and St. Teresa's College, Ernakulam. She graduated from Sacred Heart College, Thevara, and obtained her law degree from Government Law College, Ernakulam.

== Legal career ==
After enrolling as an advocate on March 9, 1991, Shoba Annamma Eapen began her legal practice. She served as a Senior Government Pleader in the Kerala High Court from 2011 to 2016. Her extensive experience in the legal field led to her appointment as an Additional Judge of that high court on May 18, 2022.
