= Thoppumpady Harbour Bridge =

Bridge across Vembanad lake

Harbour Bridge
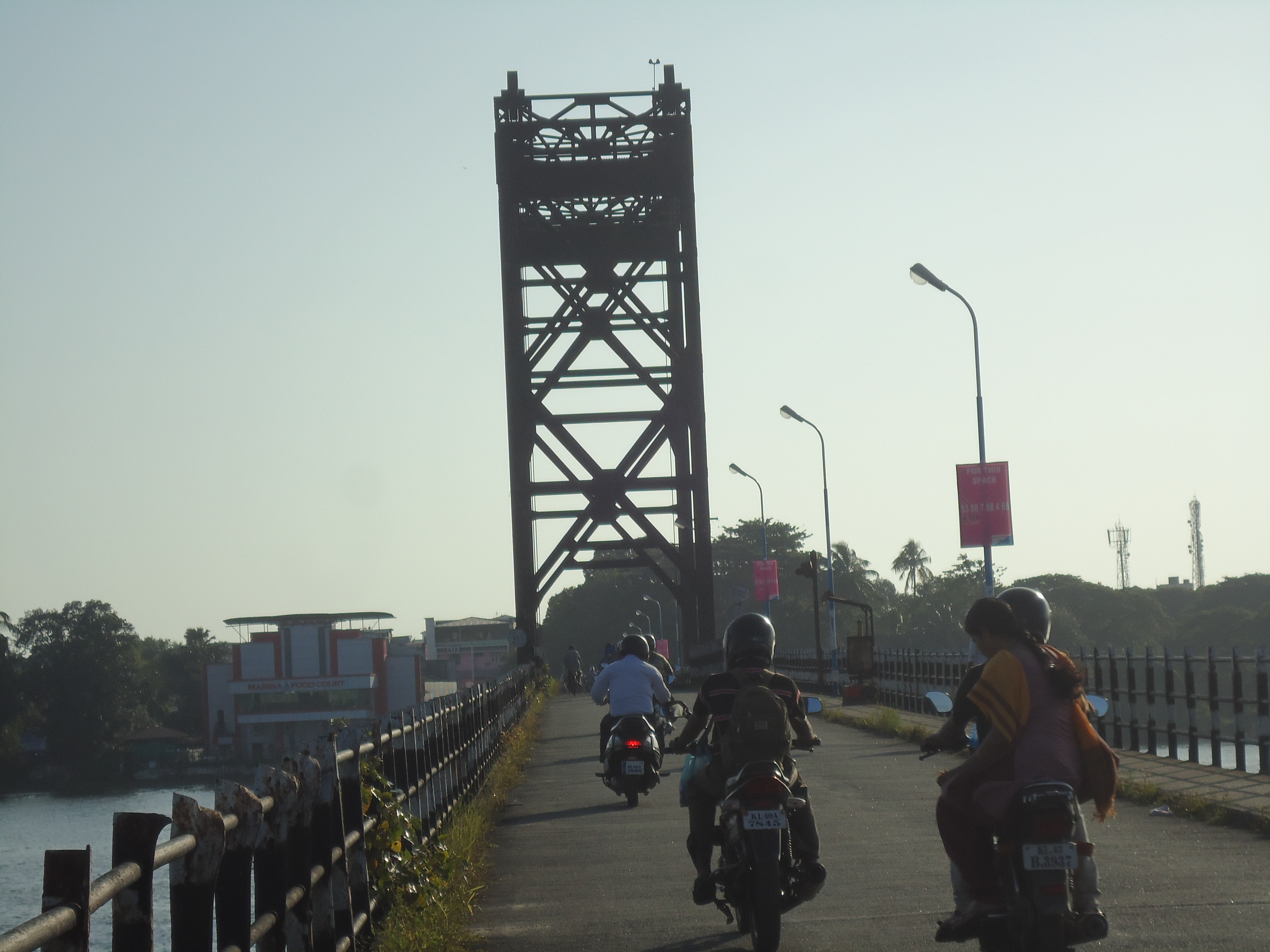
- Cochin Harbour bridge is also known as Thoppumpady bridge or Mattanchery bridge
- Coordinates: 9°56′14″N 76°15′59″E

History
- Designer: Robert Bristow
- Opened: 1940

Location
- Interactive map of Harbour Bridge

Thoppumpady Harbour Bridge, also known as Mattanchery Bridge or Thoppumpady Old Bridge, is a bridge in Thoppumpady, Kochi, Kerala, India. Earlier known as Cochin Harbour Bridge, it connects the Kochi's western mainland to Willingdon Island. A new bridge was constructed in 1998; succeeding this bridge, which is now known as the Thoppumpady BOT Bridge. Thoppumpady Harbour Bridge, which is a landmark of Kochi is now preserved as a heritage monument and carries only two and three wheelers.

The new Mattanchery bridge is the first Build-Operate-Transfer bridge in Kerala. It was built as a joint project of the Government of Kerala, the Greater Cochin Development Authority and Gammon India.

== History ==
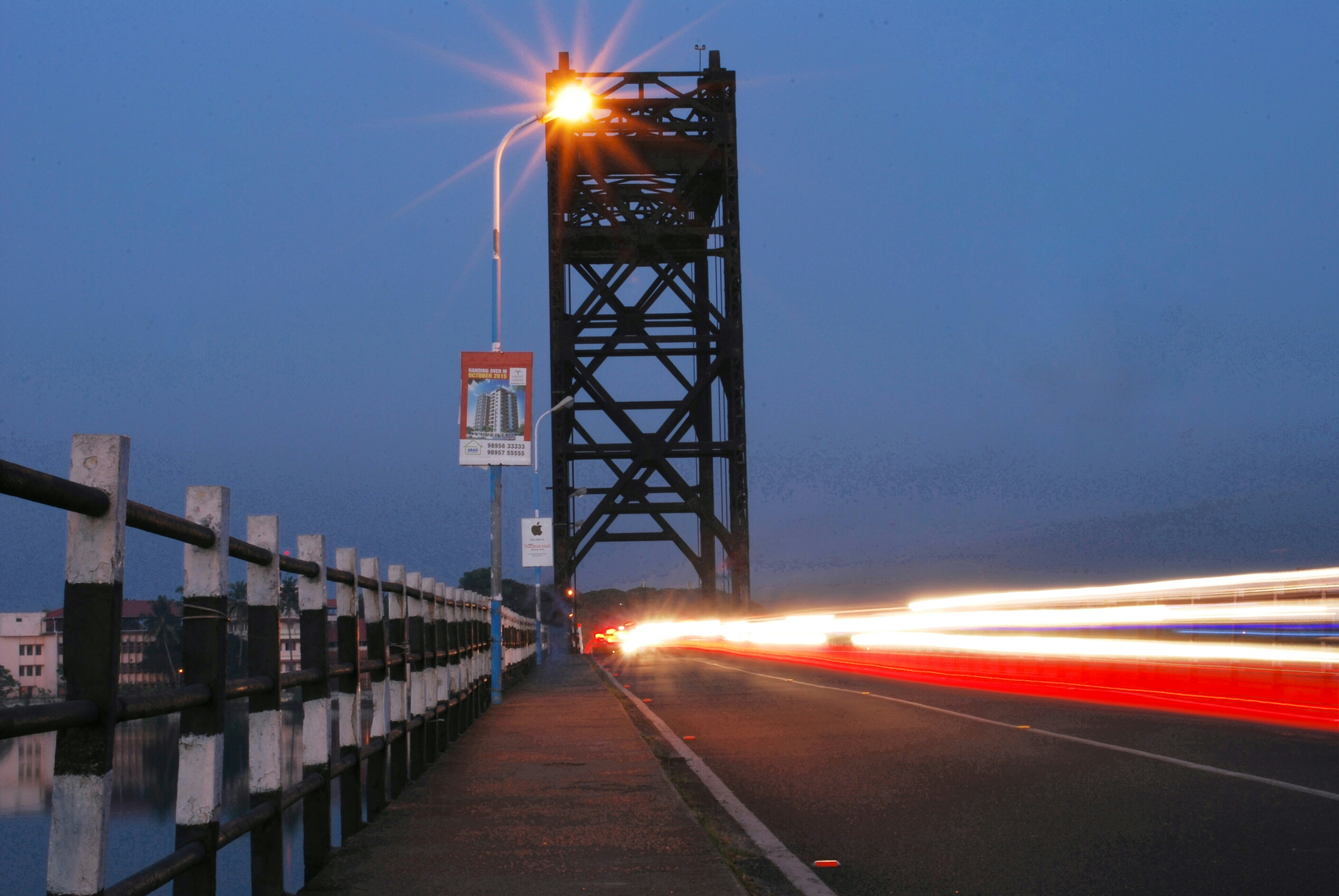
Old Harbour bridge is also known as Thoppumpady old bridge

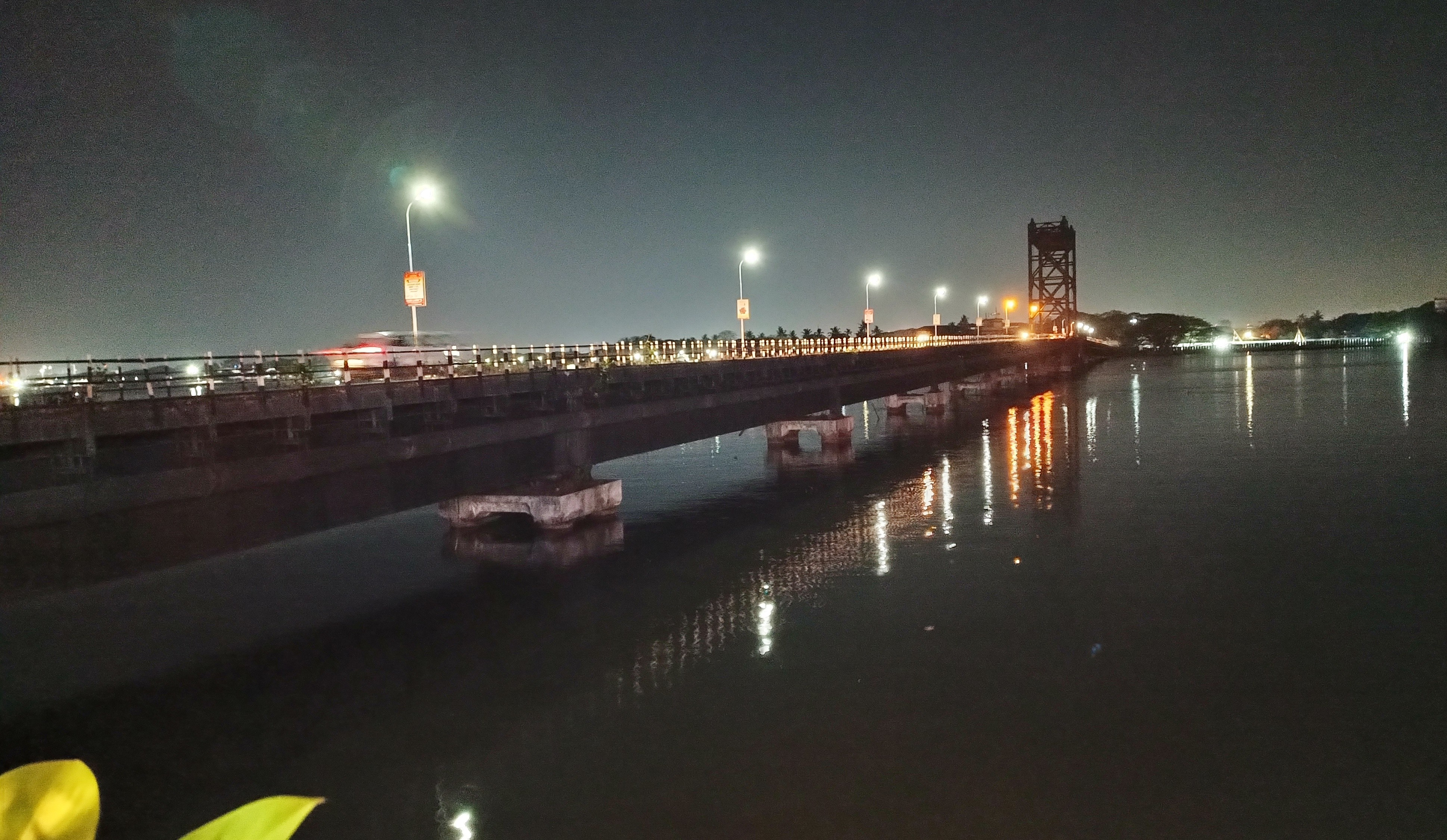
Thoppumpady Old Harbour bridge at night

Sir Robert Bristow came to Kochi in 1920 as an engineer of the East India Company. On reaching, he prepared a project document for the development of Kochi port and informed it to the Governor of Madras, Lord Willingdon. In three stages, an estuary 450 feet wide and three and a half miles long was formed connecting the deep sea and Cochin Bay and an area of 780 acres was developed from the lake using soil and the new man made island was named Willingdon Island, although it is sometimes wrongly referred to as Wellington Island. Plans to build bridges to connect Willingdon Island with Ernakulam and Mattancherry began in 1935. Following this, what is currently known as the old Mattanchery bridge or old Harbour bridge was built across the backwater under the supervision of Robert Bristow to connect Willingdon island with Mattancherry. The bridge constructed from steel and timber was 486 meters long. Its construction was completed in 1938. It was built in such a way that the middle section was lifted up with a pulley and an iron rope so that the ships coming and going to the port would not be obstructed. A special spring technology has also been used for this. The middle span of the bridge is made of 16 spans and can be lifted using a pulley and an iron rope. Before raising the bridge, a warning was given on both sides of the bridge. Bristow convinced the skeptics of the reliability of the bridge by bringing elephants and made them walk over the bridge. The bridge was commissioned on 13 April 1943. As it resembles the British construction of bridge in London, locals call it as the London bridge of Kochi. A new bridge was constructed and opened in 1998 when the old bridge was found weaker to carry heavy vehicles. Upon the arrival of the new bridge, the old bridge was partially closed and presently only four wheelers, two wheelers and light motor vehicles are allowed to cross through it. The Old Harbour Bridge is a heritage monument which is still in use.

== See also ==
- Venduruthy Bridge
- Goshree bridges
- History of Kochi
- Robert Bristow
