= Venduruthy Bridge =

Bridge across Vembanad lake

- Coordinates: 9.9461°N 76.2874°E

Characteristics
- Total length: 627 m (new road bridge)
- Width: 11 m (new road bridge)

History
- Designer: Robert Bristow
- Construction end: 1938 (old bridge); 2011 (new road bridge)
- Construction cost: 37 crore (new road bridge)
- Opened: 2012 (new road bridge); 2015 (new railway bridge)
- Closed: 2011 (old road bridge)

Location
- Interactive map of Venduruthy Bridge

Venduruthy-Vikrant Bridge, also known as Venduruthy Bridge, is a group of bridges in Kochi, Kerala, India. Presently, there is one railway bridge and two road bridges running parallel to each other, that connects the Ernakulam side of Kochi to the Willingdon Island. The bridge also marks the geographical division between West Kochi and Ernakulam. The old Venduruthy railway bridge was constructed in 1938 along with two parallel road bridges. The old railway bridge is one of the first bridges in India to be completely constructed from steel. It is a landmark in Kochi with historic significance as it played a major role in the transformation of Kochi into a major port city in India during the British era.

In 2005, a dredger hit the railway bridge which led to its closure. Following this incident, the construction of a new railway bridge started, which was opened in 2015. The old railway bridge was dismantled in March 2018. The new two-lane road bridge was opened in 2012, after the old road bridge was found to be too weak to carry heavy vehicles.

== History ==
The Venduruthy bridge was built under the supervision of the British engineer Robert Bristow. Plans to build bridges to connect Wellington Island with Ernakulam and Mattancherry began in 1935. According to Bristow, constructing the Vendurutti Bridge was an engineering challenge with no guarantee of success. Steel frames were imported from Britain to construct the bridge. Even at a depth of three hundred feet in the embankment there was no rock or solid surface in order to fasten the poles. The foundation was fixed by driving iron pipes into the mud and filling them with stone and gravel. The bridge was built at a time when iron and other metals were scarce. From Ernakulam railway station, the heavy iron was transported over land and backwaters to the bridge construction site. Rail transport to the Wellington Island became possible with the arrival of Venduruthy bridge. It was because of this bridge that the train reached the ship at Cochin port and loaded the goods. The construction of the bridge was completed in 1938 as per the records.

The old railway bridge was hit by the dredger Kamal 28 in 2004. After the impact, the speed of freight trains on the bridge was reduced. But on 24 February 2007, the same dredger hit the bridge again causing the rail traffic to be stopped completely. With the completion of the new railway bridge in 2015, the Indian railways planned to dismantle the old railway bridge. Despite protests being raised against the move to demolish the bridge without considering its historic significance, the Indian railways said that it is not practically possible to maintain the bridge. It was dismantled in March 2018.

With its deteriorating condition and increased traffic, old Venduruthy road bridge became a bottleneck. Construction of new road bridge was started in 2006 parallel to the old bridge to reduce congestion and accommodate increasing traffic. The new bridge, named Venduruthy-Vikrant Bridge, was inaugurated on 4 February 2012, after which entire traffic was shifted to the new bridge. The old Venduruthy bridge was subsequently closed to vehicular traffic.

== See also ==
- Robert Bristow
- Cochin Harbour Terminus
- Goshree bridges
- History of Kochi
- Thoppumpady BOT Bridge
- Thoppumpady Harbour Bridge
