= Central Institute of Fisheries Technology =

Research center in Kochi, India

- केंद्रीय मत्स्य प्रौद्योगिकी संस्थान
- Established: 1957; 69 years ago
- Director: Dr. George Ninan
- Location: Kochi, Kerala, 682029, India; 9°56′19″N 76°16′6″E
- Campus: Matsyapuri, Willingdon Island, Kochi
- Website: www.cift.res.in
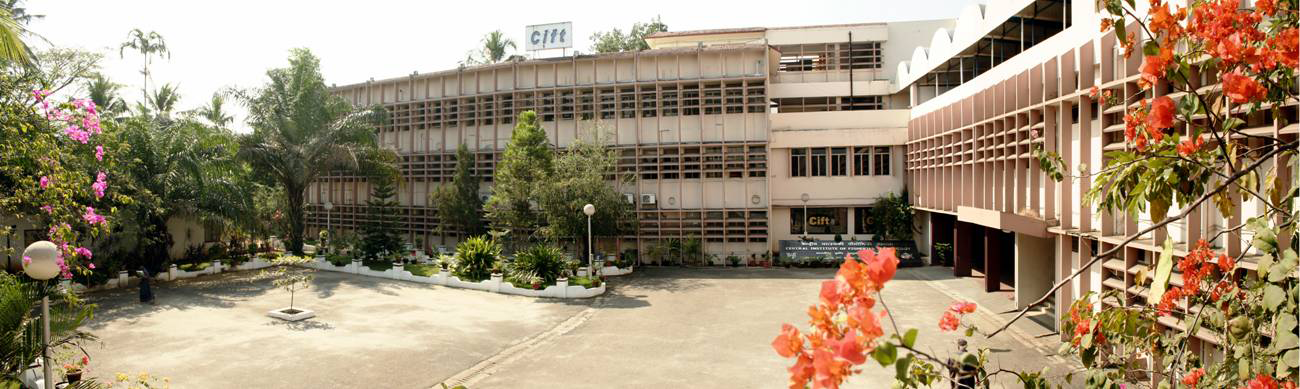

The Central Institute of Fisheries Technology (CIFT) is an autonomous organization established by the government of India, engaged in research related to fishing and fish processing in the country. The institute has its headquarters in Matsyapuri, Willingdon Island, Kochi and is a subsidiary of Indian Council of Agricultural Research (ICAR), New Delhi, under the Ministry of Agriculture and farmers' Welfare.

The Central Institute of Fisheries Technology (CIFT) was formed in 1954 and started functioning in 1957 from its headquarters in Kochi. It is considered to be the only institute where research facilities are available in all disciplines related to fishing and fish processing. CIFT is an ISO/IEC 17025:2005 NABL accredited and ISO 9001:2015 certified body.

CIFT has been selected as the seat for the establishment of the south zone Zonal Technology Management – Business Planning and Development (ZTM-BPD) Unit for catering to the individual and collective needs of 22 agricultural institutes of ICAR in south India.

== Mandate ==
1. Basic and strategic research in fishing and processing, bioactive compounds & food safety
2. Design and develop energy efficient fishing systems for responsible fishing and sustainable management
3. Development of implements and machinery for fishing and fish processing
4. Human resource development through training, education and extension

== Objectives ==
1. Basic and strategic research in fishing and processing.
2. Design and develop energy efficient fishing systems for responsible fishing and sustainable management
3. Development of implements and machinery for fishing and fish processing.
4. Human resource Development through training, education and extension.

== Divisions ==
The institute has six divisions and one section that coordinates its activities across various disciplines.

- Fishing Technology Division.
- Fish Processing Division.
- Biochemistry & Nutrition Division.
- Quality Assurance & Management Division.
- Extension, Information & Statistics Division.
- Microbiology, Fermentation and Biotechnology Division.
- Engineering Section.

== Research centers ==
CIFT has three research centers in India.

- CIFT Visakhapatanam RC, Pandurangapuram, Visakhapatanam, Andhra Pradesh
- CIFT Veraval RC, Veraval, Gujarat
- CIFT Mumbai RC, Vashi, Navi Mumbai, Maharashtra

== National important facilities of CIFT ==
=== Agribusiness Incubator ===
The Agribusiness Incubator is a service program of ZTM-BPD Unit at CIFT, aimed at providing entrepreneurs and start-ups with new technologies. The program offer shared office services, access to equipment, prototype development support, research assistance and expandable space to entrepreneurs during the initial stages to render their businesses financially viable, self-sustaining and profit making.

=== National Reference Laboratory ===
ICAR-Central Institute of Fisheries Technology, Cochin has been conferred with a status of “National Reference Laboratory (NRL) for Fish and Fish Products” by Food Safety and Standards Authority of India (FSSAI), Ministry of Health and Family Welfare, Govt. of India under Regulation 3 of Food Safety and Standards (Recognition and Notification of Laboratories) Regulation, 2018 on 19 March 2019 vide Order No. 12013/02/2017-QA. ICAR-CIFT is the only research Institute under SMD (Fishery), ICAR to be adorned with such a high-profile recognition. The institute had already been notified as National Referral Laboratory vide Government of India Gazette Notification S.O. 97(E) of Ministry of Health and Family Welfare (Food Safety and Standards Authority of India) dated 10 January 2017. Along with ICAR-CIFT, eight more laboratories in Government sector and five laboratories in private sector have also been given the status of National Reference Laboratory in specific areas.

As per FSSAI guidelines, the functions of National Reference Laboratory (NRL) are as follows:

- Be the resource centre for provision of information on certified reference materials
- Develop standards for routine testing procedures and reliable testing methods
- Provide technical support in the area of competence
- Evaluate the performance of other notified laboratories
- Coordinate exchange of information amongst notified laboratories
- Collaborate for data generation among network of notified food laboratories and referral food laboratories and collate the data related to their specific domain
- Carry out such other functions, as may be specified by the Food Authority from time to time in the related areas

Under the NRL notification, ICAR-CIFT has earmarked with the following research activities on emerging issues pertaining to:

- Risk assessment of dietary exposure of persistent organic pollutants and emerging contaminants such as brominated flame retardants and pharmacologically active substances to Indian population from fish and fisheries products.
- Research on ingression of specific migration of chemicals from plastic packaging materials to fishery products
- Research on incidence of biotoxins in finfish/shellfish

=== Fish behaviour lab ===
As part of the move to promote responsible fishing, a new lab first of its kind in the country to study fish behaviour was inaugurated on May 25, 2019 at ICAR-Central Institute of Fisheries Technology, Cochin.
