= Venduruthy =

- Island
- Interactive map of Venduruthy
- Coordinates: 9°56′45″N 76°17′16″E
- Country: India
- State: Kerala
- District: Ernakulam

Languages
  - Official: Malayalam, English
- Time zone: UTC+5:30 (IST)
- Vehicle registration: KL-

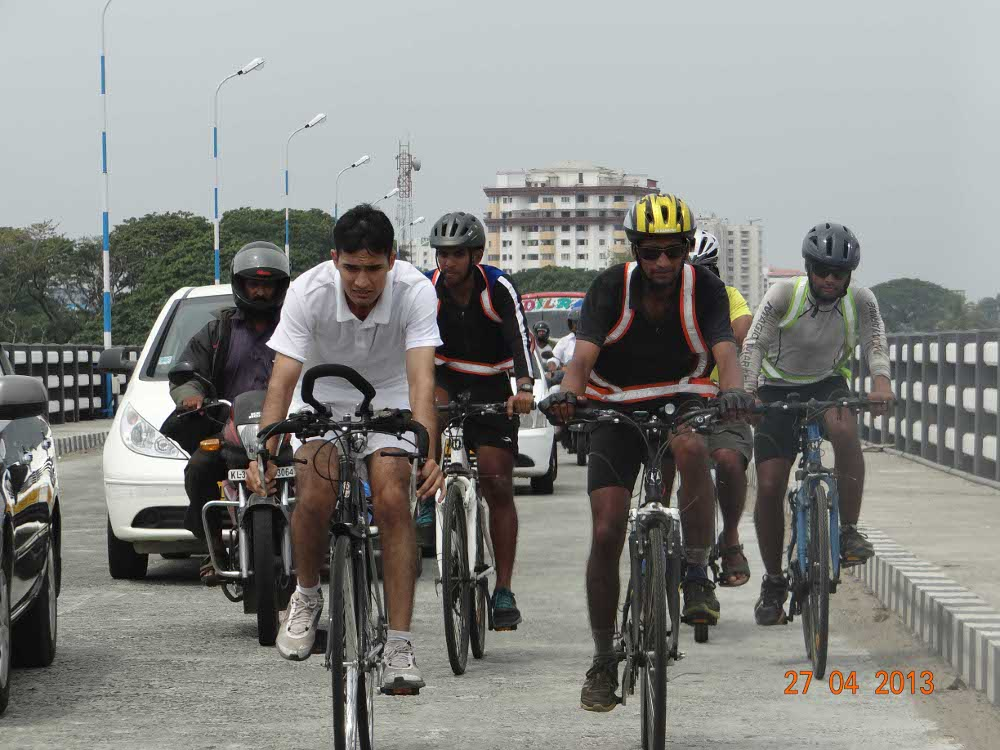
Cycling race

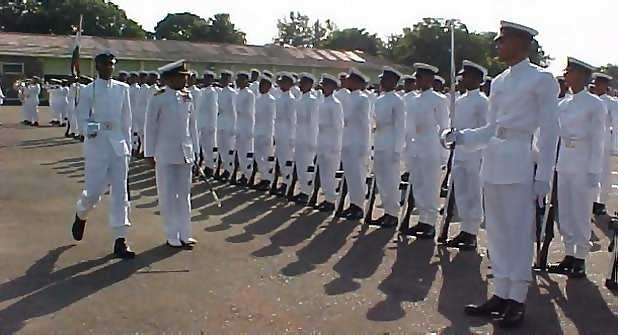
Naval Station at Venduruthy

Venduruthy is a small island in Kochi, India. It is now a part of the greater Willingdon Island. The isolated island is approachable only from the Ernakulam backwater channel. It boasted of two edifices-the Roman Catholic Church of Saint Peter and Saint Paul, it was built by the early Portuguese settlers in the 16th century.

In 1925 when the late Marquis of Willingdon was Governor of Madras Province, the question of reclaiming this boggy marshland arose in Parliament and after many heated debates, reclamation was put into operation, lasting over a period of twenty years, eventually producing an island of no mean size.

Black heavy clay silt was scoured from the channel bed by the dredger Lord Willingdon and deposited in vast quantities upon the site, whilst around the perimeter a strong four-foot stone wall was constructed as a safeguard against inroads from the sea. Trees were planted along the coast to keep the soil firm. Within a decade the island which is now named Willingdon Island came into being. The Cochin Port Trust (Madras), commandeered the areas fringing the Mattancherry Channel north-west of the island and built fine buildings and a solid wharf. The rest of the land lay open with an abundance of grass and shrubbery growing in great profusion .

An Indian Naval Training Establishment, INS Venduruthy has been named after it. Two important defense schools at Venduruthy are—the Gunnery School and the Navigation and Direction School.

== See also ==
- Venduruthy Bridge
