= Robert Bristow (engineer) =

British engineer

- Born: 13 December 1880; London, England
- Died: 3 September 1966 (aged 85); England
- Spouse: Gertrude Kimpton
- Engineering career
- Discipline: Harbour engineering
- Projects: Willingdon Island; Venduruthy Bridge Mattancherry Bridge

Sir Robert Bristow (13 December 1880 – 3 September 1966) was a British harbour engineer best known for his contributions to the development of the port of Kochi (Cochin) in Kerala, India and is regarded as the architect of modern Kochi port. Bristow recounted his experiences in his book Cochin Saga, which is considered an important source of historiography of Kerala. He is also noted for his initiatives in founding the Lotus Club, the first inter-racial club in Kochi. He was also a member of the Royal Society of Arts.

== Early life ==
Born in London on 13 December 1880 to Alfred Bristow and Laura Web, Bristow studied at the Technical Institute in London and joined the Civil Engineering Service in 1903. He graduated as an architect from the City College of London and the Technical Institute of London. He worked in various harbours for the next sixteen years, including ports such as Malta and Portsmouth. He was also involved in the maintenance of the Suez Canal. He joined the services of the Madras government at the age of 39, and came to Kochi on 13 April 1920 under the direction of Lord Willingdon, then the Governor of Madras.

== Engineering career ==
During Bristow's time, trade at the port of Kochi had increased substantially, and the need to develop it was greatly felt. The port, which was under British rule since 1795, had seen little development, despite its illustrious maritime history. According to Sreedhara Menon, It took some time for the British authorities to realise the commercial and strategic potential of Kochi as a port and take the necessary steps for its development, as if to compensate for the earlier neglect.

In 1920 he came to Kochi to explore the possibility of building a modern port at Kochi Bay. Bristow studied waves and tides in the ocean and conducted various experiments. Bristow was thus assigned with the charge of constructing an approach channel from the deep sea to the inner harbour. This would help ships to enter the safer harbour rather than be exposed to the violent sea where they currently berthed while offloading cargo. The challenge Bristow faced in his task, was the obstruction caused due to a rock-like sand bar that guarded the entrance to the port. However, he was widely optimistic, and started off with a detailed study of the harbour and submitted a report to Lord Willingdon, the Governor of Madras. He showed that the Vypin coast could be protected from erosion by laying large granite boulders to reduce the force of the waves and that the scraped soil could be used in an environmentally friendly way. His plan mainly consisted of adding excavated soil to the island of Venduruti, filling a part of the embankment itself. Plans to dredge the rock-harder estuary to connect the new island to the shore and Mattancherry on one side by building new jetties, as well as laying out the outline for a modern harbor with harbor island, bridges and railway. For the next twenty one years, he was involved with the construction of the port and succeeded in transforming Kochi into one of the safest harbours in the peninsula, where ships berthed alongside the newly reclaimed inner harbour equipped with a long array of steam cranes. However, Bristow's port project was seen by the India Office authorities in London as the crazy idea of a British engineer. This is because the dredger ship and other technologies required to build the port at Kochi, as well as the necessary fuel and metals including iron, were not readily available during the ravages of the First World War. But Bristow saw a potential that the authorities in London, Delhi and Madras did not. He used the workers who know Kochi, backwater and sea. The steamship Padma, sailing from Bombay on 26 May 1928, was the first major ship to enter the newly constructed inner harbour of Kochi.

In three stages, an estuary 450 feet wide and three and a half miles wide was formed connecting the deep sea and Cochin Bay. An area of 780 acres was developed from the lake using soil and the island was named Willingdon Island. Around 3.2 km^{2} of land was reclaimed during the dredging process. The Willingdon Island, as it was known (after the Madras Governor), soon grew to become a prominent part of the city. It today houses the Cochin Port and the headquarters of the Southern Naval Command.

Speaking to the BBC on 11 August 1935, Bristow proudly proclaimed his achievements at the Kochi port with the following words: I live on a large Island made from the bottom of the sea. It is called Willingdon Island, after the present Viceroy of India. From the upper floor of my house, I look down on the finest harbour in the East.

Plans to build bridges to connect Willingdon Island with Ernakulam and Mattancherry began in 1935. In 1936, the Government of India declared Kochi as a major port. The first railway bridge, known as Venduruthy Bridge, along with two parallel road bridges connecting Venduruthy with the mainland Kochi was constructed in 1938 under the supervision of Bristow. Rail transport to the Willingdon Island became possible with the arrival of Venduruthy bridge. On 2 June 1939, a ship docked at the wharf for the first time for official loading. The government were also able to build a strategic air base on Willingdon Island. Mattancherry Bridge is a bridge built under Bristow's supervision in 1940 to connect Willington Island and Fort Kochi. The bridge built across the Vembanad lake was also Kerala's first self-elevating bridge. The construction was in such a way that the middle span of the bridge could be raised up so that cargo ships could pass to Kochi port. In this way, ships could reach the port without hindrance and vehicles could travel freely to both sides.

Bristow returned to England on 13 April 1941. He served at the Manchester University for some time. He died in September 1966 at the age of 85.

== Other works ==
=== Cochin Saga ===
Sir Robert Bristow in his book "Cochin Saga" (1959) tells the history of foreign government and business adventures in Kerala, South India, by Arabs, Romans, Venetians, Dutch, and British. Cochin Saga is considered to be an authentic record of events during the period 1920–41, a period which witnessed milestone events in Kochi.

=== The Lotus Club ===
Bristow is also noted for co-founding with his wife the Lotus Club in 1931. Baring the prevailing social stigma, the Bristows opened the club to people of all races and genders, doing full justice to its objective of being "a club where men, women and children of all communities would have the opportunity of meeting together and cultivating mutual acquaintance and promoting good fellowship." Thus, the club became the first non-white-exclusive club in the state.

== Legacy ==
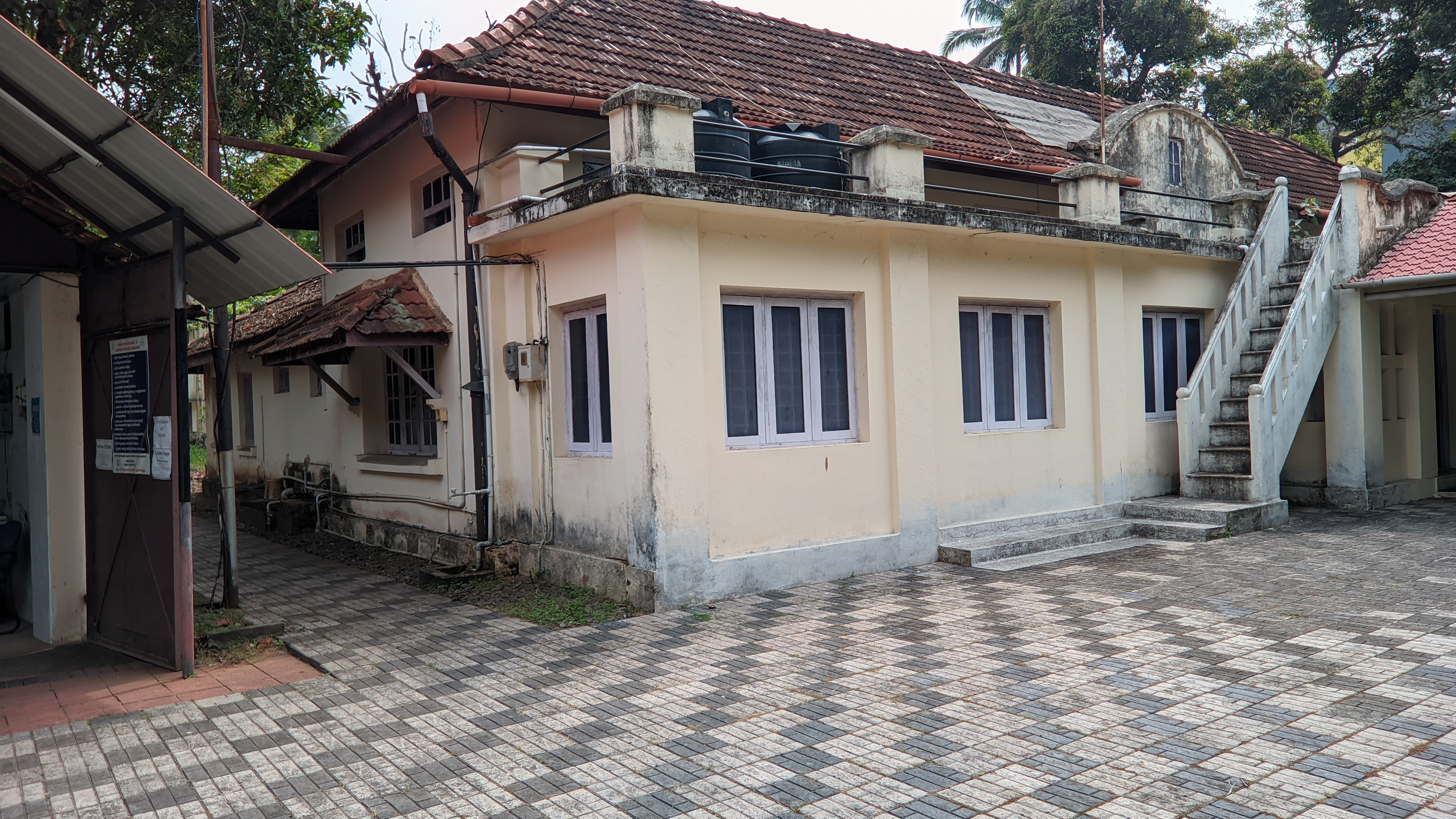
Cochin Port Maritime Heritage Museum, which depicts the history of Cochin Port and how Bristow transformed Kochi into a major port city

Robert Bristow is credited for transforming Kochi from a mere roadstead into a modern harbour. As a tribute to Bristow, one of the major roads in the Willington Island is named after him.

== See also ==
- British East India Company
- History of Kochi
- History of Kerala
- Cochin Port Maritime Heritage Museum

== Bibliography ==
- Akhilavijnanakosam (an encyclopaedia in Malayalam ), Vol. 4, D.C. Books
