= Gundu Island =

Island in Kochi, India

Coordinates: 9°58.75′N 76°14.6′E

The Gundu Island is one of the many islands that make up the city of Kochi, Kerala, India. The November 1967 amalgamation order of the Kerala Legislative Assembly declared Gundu Island as part of Kochi. Gundu is the smallest island around Kochi with an area of 5 acres (20,000 m^{2}) surrounded by coconut trees. The Island lies between Vypin and Vallarpadam islands. The island can be reached from Vypin island only by boat.

== Climate ==
The cool breeze and the calm atmosphere of the island attract a lot of visitors.

== Buildings ==
The only building on the island belongs to a privately owned Coir factory that produces ropes and carpets with handmade looms.

== See also ==
- Geography of Kochi
