= History of Kochi =

Kochi is a coastal city in the Ernakulam District in the Indian state of Kerala about 200 km from Thiruvananthapuram, the state capital.

Timeline of Kochi
Year	Event
1102	The kingdom of Kulasekhara breaks up, and the Permbadappu Swaroopam is formed.
1341	The port at Kodungallur is destroyed in a massive flooding in the Periyar. The prominence of Kochi as a trading post increases.
1410	Chinese treasure fleet under the command of General Zheng He visits Kochi
1440	European traveler Niccolò Da Conti visits Kochi
1500	Portuguese Admiral Pedro Álvares Cabral, lands at Kochi and establishes diplomatic relations
1503	Port of Kochi is taken over by the Portuguese.
1663	Port of Kochi taken over by the Dutch.
1664	Dutch establish municipality of Fort Kochi, the first municipality in Indian subcontinent
1773	The Kingdom of Mysore conquers Kochi.
1814	Anglo-Dutch Treaty of 1814 officially passes the city to the Kingdom of Cochin, a British Protectorate
1947	India gains independence, Kochi joins the Indian Union.
1956	The State of Kerala is formed.
1967	Kochi Corporation comes into existence.

For many centuries up to and during the British Raj, the city of Kochi was the seat of the eponymous princely state. Muziris, a centre of global trade somewhere north to Kochi (presently identified with Kodungallur in Thrissur district), traces its history back many centuries, when it was the centre of Indian spice trade for hundreds of years, and was known to the Jews, Arabs, Yavanas (Greeks, Romans), and Chinese since ancient times. Kochi earned a significant position in Malabar Coast after the port at Kodungallur was destroyed by massive flooding of the river Periyar in 1341.
The earliest documented references to Kochi occur in the books written by Chinese voyager Ma Huan, during his visit to Kochi in the 15th century as part of the treasure fleet of Admiral Zheng He. There are also references to Kochi in accounts written by Italian traveller Niccolò Da Conti, who visited Cochin in 1440. Today, Kochi is the commercial hub of Kerala, and one of the fastest growing second-tier metropolises in India.

== Princely rule ==
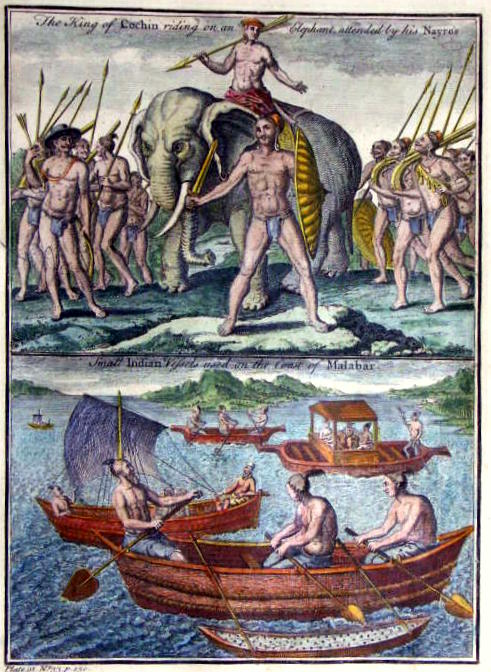
The King of Cochin and small Malabar boats

The early history of Kochi is not well documented. Kochi's prominence as a trading port grew after the collapse of the port at Kodungallur in 1341 AD.

The Perumpadappu Swaroopam came into existence in 1102 AD after the breaking up of the Kulasekhara empire. The ruler of Perumpadappu (near Ponnani) fled to Kodungallur in the early medieval period, when the Zamorin of Calicut annexed Ponnani region, after Tirunavaya war. They later moved to Kochi and established the Kingdom of Cochin. When Vasco Da Gama landed at Kozhikode and the Zamorin of Calicut fought against the Portuguese led by Kunjali Marakkar(The naval chief of the kingdom of Kozhikode), the ruler of Cochin aligned with the Portuguese.

The port at Kozhikode held superior economic and political position in medieval Kerala coast, while Kannur, Kollam, and Kochi, were commercially important secondary ports, where the traders from various parts of the world would gather. On the Malabar coast during the early 15th century, Calicut and Kochi were in an intense rivalry, so the Ming dynasty of China decided to intervene by granting special status to Kochi and its ruler known as Keyili (可亦里) to the Chinese. Calicut had been the dominant port-city in the region, but Kochi was emerging as its main rival. For the fifth Ming treasure voyage, Admiral Zheng He was instructed to confer a seal upon Keyili of Kochi and enfeoff a mountain in his kingdom as the Zhenguo Zhi Shan (鎮國之山, Mountain Which Protects the Country). Zheng He delivered a stone tablet, inscribed with a proclamation composed by the Yongle Emperor himself, to Kochi. As long as Kochi remained under the protection of Ming China, the Zamorin of Calicut was unable to invade Kochi and a military conflict was averted. The cessation of the Ming treasure voyages consequently had negative results for Kochi, as the Zamorin of Calicut would eventually launch an invasion against Kochi. In the late 15th century, the Zamorin occupied Kochi and installed his representative as the king of the port-city.

== Foreign influences ==
Kochi was under the influence of many foreign powers, during which the Raja of Kochi still remained the titular head.

=== Ming dynasty alliance (1406-1433) ===
The port at Kozhikode held superior economic and political position on the medieval Kerala coast, while Kannur, Kollam, and Kochi, were commercially important secondary ports, where the traders from various parts of the world would gather. On the Malabar coast during the early 15th century, Calicut and Cochin were in an intense rivalry, so the Ming dynasty of China decided to intervene by granting special status to Cochin and its ruler, known as Keyili (可亦里) to the Chinese. Calicut had been the dominant port-city in the region, but Cochin was emerging as its main rival. For the fifth Ming treasure voyage, Admiral Zheng He was instructed to confer a seal upon Keyili of Cochin and designate a mountain in his kingdom as the Zhenguo Zhi Shan (鎮國之山, Mountain Which Protects the Country). Zheng He delivered a stone tablet, inscribed with a proclamation composed by the Yongle Emperor himself, to Cochin. The cessation of the Ming treasure voyages consequently had negative results for Cochin, as the Zamorin of Calicut later launched an invasion against Cochin. In the late 15th century, the Zamorin occupied Cochin and installed his representative as the king.

=== Portuguese period (1503–1663) ===
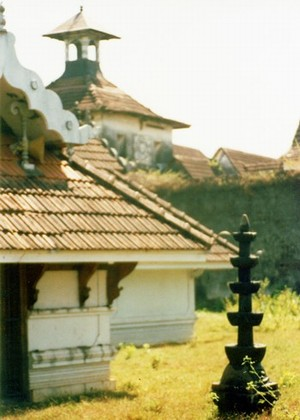
Mattancherry Palace-temple, which was built during the Portuguese period by the Cochin Raja Veera Kerala Varma

The Portuguese arrived at Kappad Kozhikode in 1498 during the Age of Discovery, thus opening a direct sea route from Europe to India. Kochi was the scene of the first European settlement in India. In the year 1500, the Portuguese Admiral Pedro Álvares Cabral, landed at Cochin after being repelled from Calicut. The king of Kochi, a rival, welcomed the Portuguese as his guests and a treaty of friendship was signed. Promising his support in the conquest of Calicut, the admiral coaxed the king into allowing them to build a factory at Cochin. Assured by the support, the king called war with the Zamorins of Calicut. However, the admiral retreated in panic on seeing the powers of the Zamorin.

Another captain, João da Nova, was sent in place of Cabral. However, he too faltered at the sight of the Zamorin. The consecutive retreats made the King of Portugal indignant. The king sent Vasco Da Gama, who bombed Calicut and destroyed the Arab trading posts. This invited the anger of the Zamorin, who declared a war against the Kochi Raja.

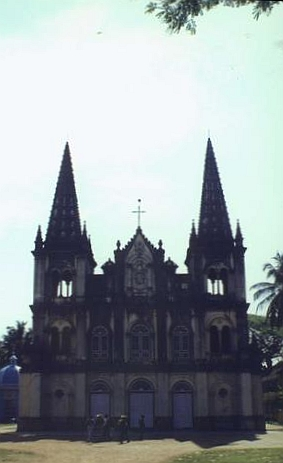
The Santa Cruz Cathedral Basilica in Kochi, which was built by the Portuguese

The war between Calicut and Cochin began on 1 March 1503 and the second invasion lasted from 16 March 1504, to 3 July 1504 (Battle of Cochin (1504)). However, the oncoming monsoons and the arrival of a Portuguese fleet under Lopo Soares de Albergaria in September, 1504 (and a year later, the armada led by Francisco de Almeida and Afonso de Albuquerque), alarmed the Zamorin, and he recalled his army. The Zamorin resorted to a retreat also because the revered festival of Onam was near, and the Zamorin intended to keep the auspicious day holy. This led to a triumph for the king of Kochi, who later reestablished the possession of his kingdom. However, much of the kingdom was burnt and destroyed by the armies. The garrison, led by Duarte Pacheco Pereira, repelled the enemy.

The ruler of the Kingdom of Tanur, who was a vassal to the Zamorin of Calicut, sided with the Portuguese, against his overlord at Kozhikode. The ruler of Tanur also sided with Cochin. Many of the members of the royal family of Cochin in 16th and 17th centuries were selected from Vettom. However, the Tanur forces under the king fought for the Zamorin of Calicut in the Battle of Cochin (1504). However, the allegiance of the Muslim Mappila merchants in Tanur region remained with the Zamorin of Calicut.

After securing the king in his throne, the Portuguese got permission to build a fort –- Fort Kochi (Fort Emmanuel) (after the reigning king of Portugal) – surrounding the Portuguese factory, to protect it from any further attacks. The entire work was commissioned by the Cochin Raja, who supplied workers and material. The Raja continued to rule with the help of the Portuguese. Meanwhile, the Portuguese secretly tried to enter into an alliance with the Zamorins. Later attempts by the Zamorin at conquering the Kochi port was thwarted by the Cochin Raja with the help of the Portuguese. Slowly, the Portuguese armoury at Kochi was increased, with the presumed notion of helping the raja protect Kochi. However, the measure led to decrease in the power of the Cochin Raja, and an increase in the Portuguese influence.

From 1503 to 1663, Port of Kochi was controlled by Portugal, with the blessing of the Kochi Raja. Kochi remained the main base of the Portuguese in India till 1510. In 1530, Saint Francis Xavier arrived and founded a Christian mission. The following Portuguese period was difficult for the Jews living in the region, since the Inquisition was established in Portuguese India in 1560. Kochi hosted the grave of Vasco da Gama, the Portuguese viceroy, who was buried at St. Francis Church until his remains were exhumed and interred in Portugal in 1539. Soon after the time of Albuquerque, the Portuguese influence in Kerala declined.

=== Dutch period (1663–1773) ===
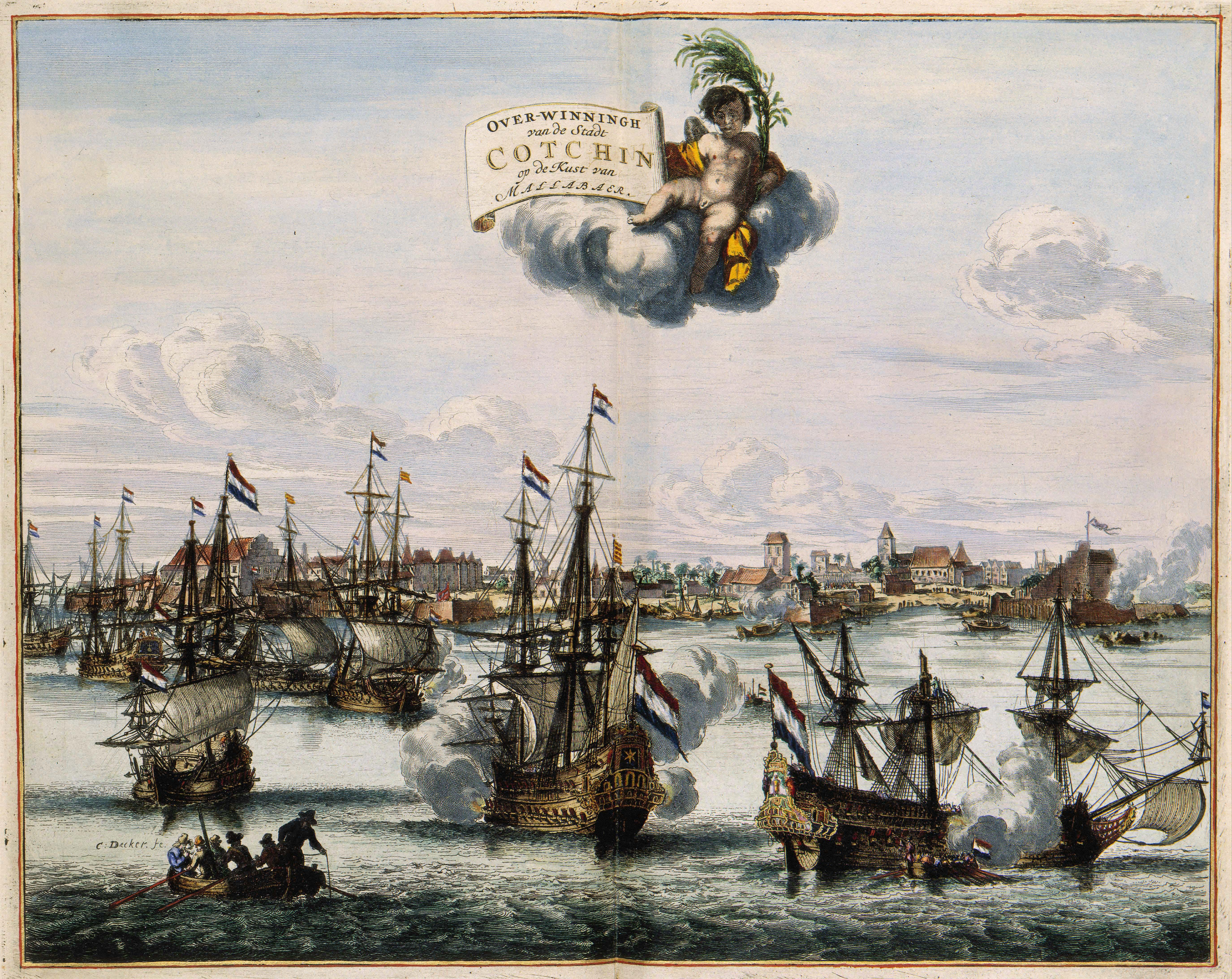
In 1663, the Dutch conquered the city of Cochin from the Portuguese. (Coenraet Decker, 1682)

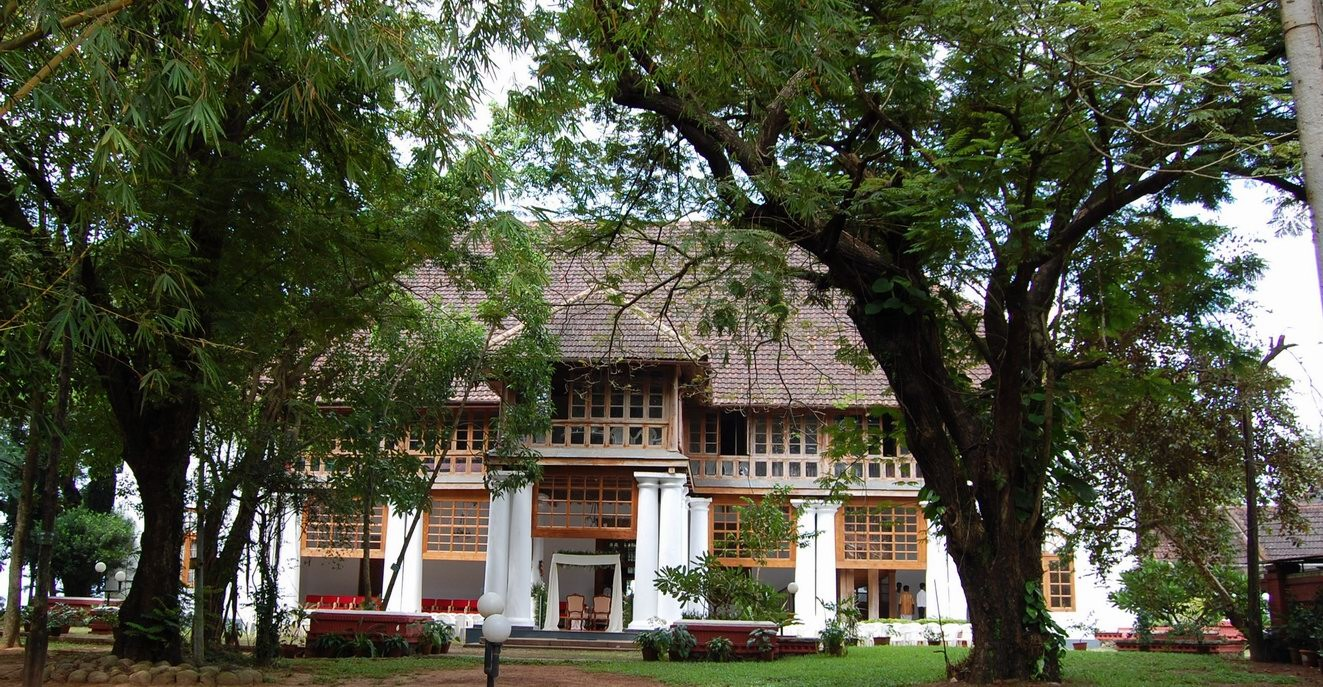
The Bolgatty Palace, built in 1744, by Dutch traders, is one of the oldest existing Dutch-era palaces outside of the Netherlands.

The Portuguese rule was followed by that of the Dutch, who had by then conquered Quilon, after various encounters with the Portuguese and their allies. Discontented members of the Cochin Royal family called on the assistance of the Dutch for help in overthrowing the Cochin Raja. The Dutch successfully landed at Njarakal and headed on to capture the Pallipuram Fort, which they handed over to the Zamorin. Then they went on to establishing the municipality of Fort Kochi in 1664, the first municipality in Indian subcontinent.

=== British Period (1814–1947) ===
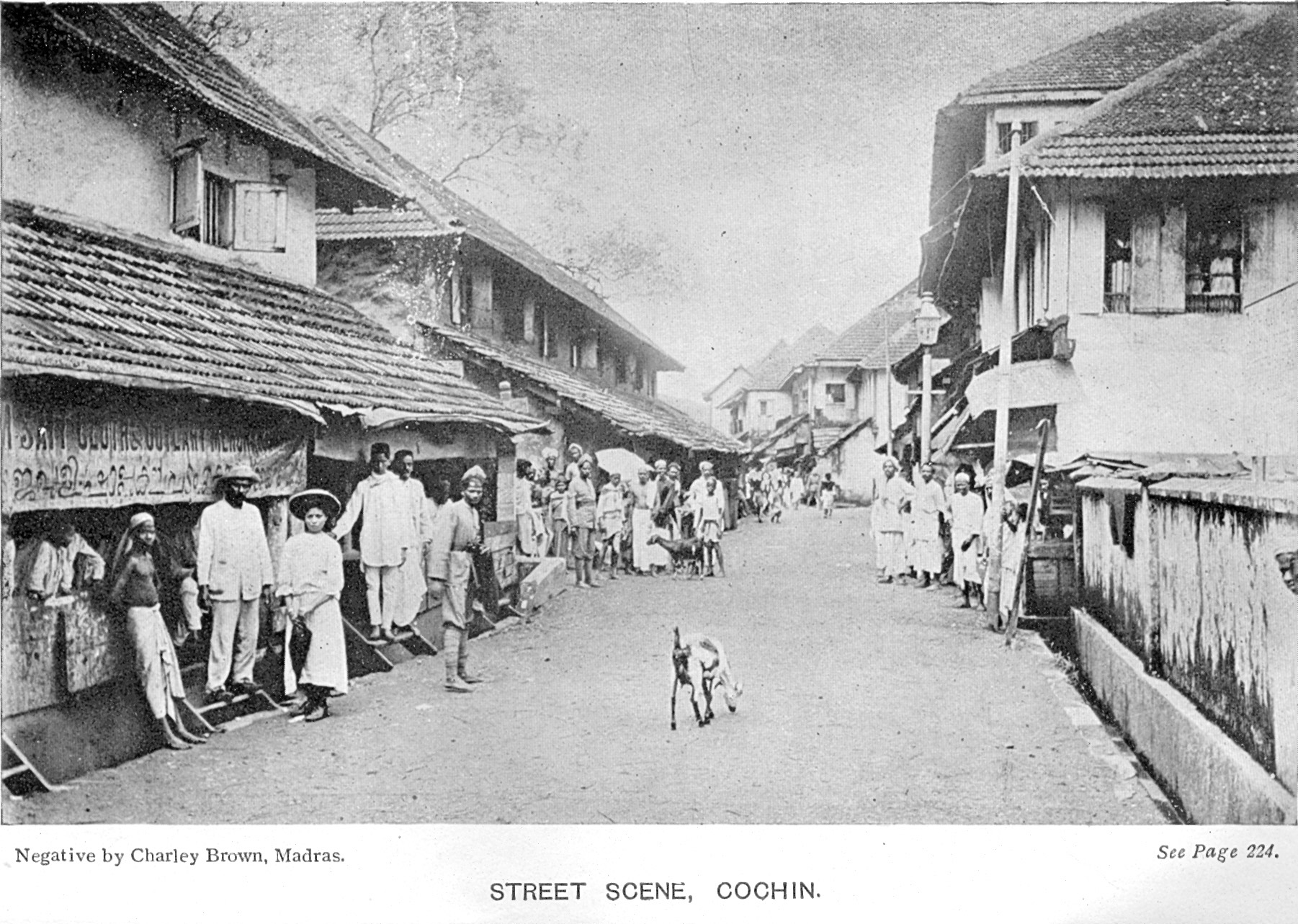
Cochin in Colonial times

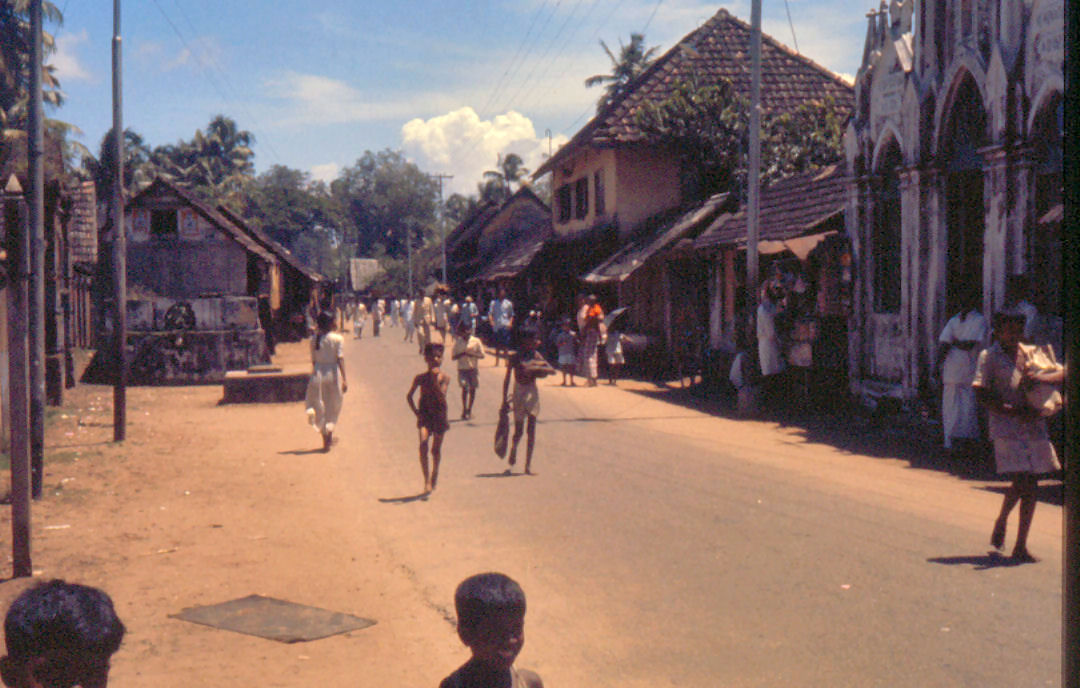
Cochin in 1960s

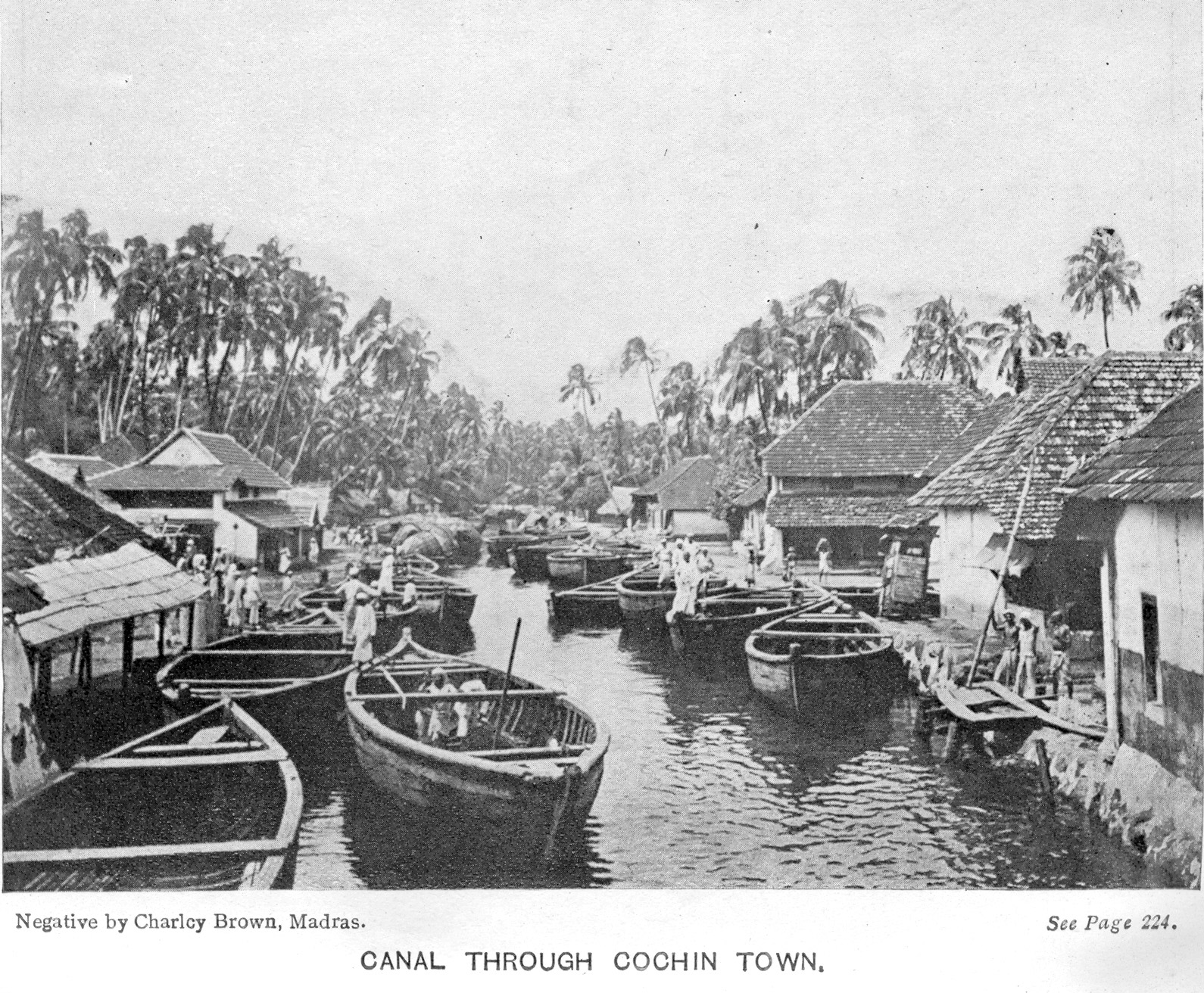
Cochin in Colonial times

In 1814 according to the Anglo-Dutch Treaty, the islands of Kochi, including Fort Kochi and its territory were ceded to the United Kingdom in exchange for the island of Malaya. Even prior to the signing of the treaty, there are evidence of English residents in Kochi.

Towards the early 20th century, trade at the port had increased substantially, and the need to develop the port was greatly felt. Harbour Engineer Robert Bristow, was thus brought to Cochin in 1920 under the direction of Lord Willingdon, then the Governor of Madras. In a span of 21 years, he had transformed Cochin as the safest harbour in the peninsula, where ships berthed alongside the newly reclaimed inner harbour equipped with a long array of steam cranes. Meanwhile, in 1866, Fort Cochin municipality reestablished. Fort Kochi, was made a municipality on 1 November 1866, along with Kannur, Thalassery, Kozhikode, and Palakkad, according to the Madras Act 10 of 1865 (Amendment of the Improvements in Towns act 1850) of the British Indian Empire. Its first Municipal Council seating contest was conducted in 1883. The Maharajah of Cochin, in 1896 initiated local administration, by forming town councils in Mattancherry and Ernakulam. In 1925, Kochi legislative assembly was constituted due to public pressure on the state. The assembly consisted of 45 members, 10 of who were officially nominated. Thottakkattu Madhaviamma became the first woman to be a member of any legislature in India.

== Post Independence era ==
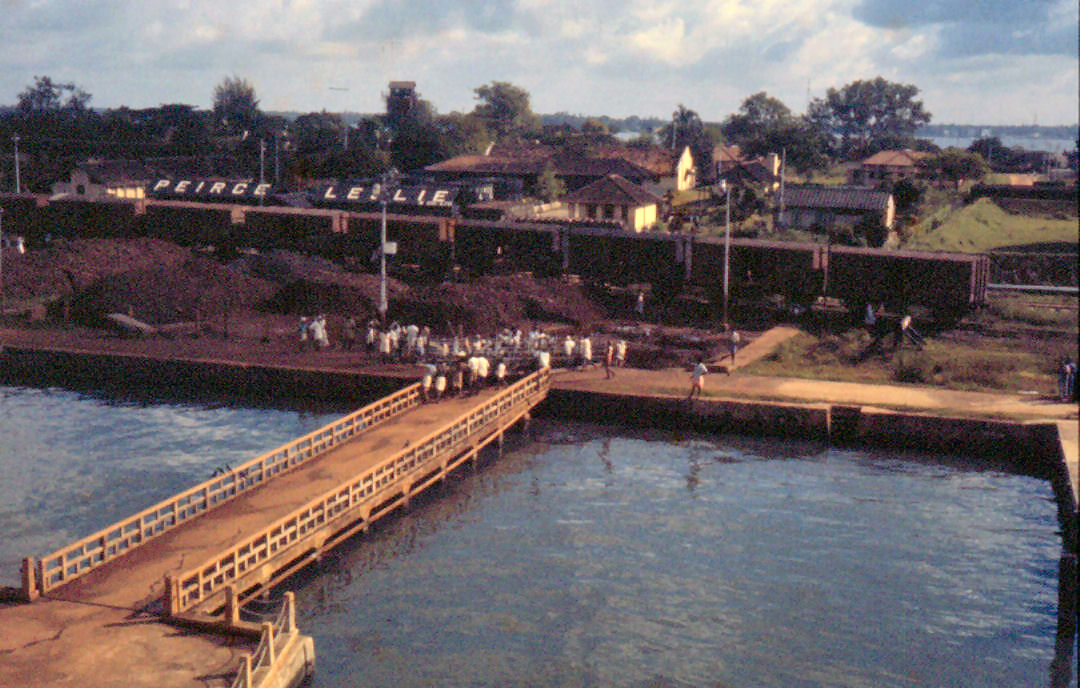
Cochin Harbour in 1960s

In 1947, India gained independence from the British colonial rule. Cochin was the first princely state to join the Indian Union willingly. Post independence, E. Ikkanda Warrier became the first Prime Minister of Kochi. K. P. Madhavan Nair, P.T Jacob, C. Achutha Menon, Panampilly Govinda Menon were few of the other stalwarts who were in the forefront of the democratic movements. Then in 1949, Travancore-Cochin state came into being by the merger of Cochin and Travancore, with Parur T. K. Narayana Pillai as the first chief minister. Travancore-Cochin, was in turn merged with the Malabar district of the Madras State. Finally, the Government of India's 1 November 1956 States Reorganisation Act inaugurated a new state – Kerala – incorporating Travancore-Cochin, Malabar District, and the taluk of Kasargod, South Kanara. On 9 July 1960, the Mattancherry council passed a resolution that was forwarded to the government, requesting the formation of a Municipal Corporation by combining the existing municipalities of Fort Kochi, Mattancherry and Ernakulam. The proposal was condemned by the Fort Kochi municipality. However, the Ernakulam municipality welcomed the proposal, suggesting the inclusion of more suburban areas in the amalgamated Corporation. Major Balagangadhara Menon, the then Director of Local Bodies was appointed by the government to study the feasibility of the suggested merger. And based on the report submitted by him, the Kerala Legislative Assembly approved the formation of the Corporation. Thus, on 1 November 1967, exactly 11 years since the conception of the state of Kerala, the corporation of Cochin came into existence, by the merger of the municipalities of Ernakulam, Mattancherry and Fort Kochi, along with that of the Willingdon Island and four panchayats viz. Palluruthy, Vennala, Vyttila and Edappally and the small islands of Gundu and Ramanthuruth.

== See also ==
- History of Kerala
- History of India
- Chera dynasty
- Kerala
- Robert Bristow
