= Kulasekhara =

Kulasekhara (Sinhala: කුලසේකර; also transliterated as Kulachekara in Tamil and early Malayalam), meaning "Head-Ornament of the Race", is a South Asian male name, used both as a given name and a last name. It is commonly found in south India — particularly in Tamil Nadu — and in Sri Lanka.

== People with name Kulasekhara ==
- Nuwan Kulasekara, Sri Lankan cricketer (born 1982)
- Kosala Kulasekara, Sri Lankan cricketer (born 1985)

== In historical context ==
=== Pandya dynasty ===
Several Pandya royals who held the regnal name "Kulasekhara" are known to scholars.

- Jatavarma Kulasekara I (fl. late 12th century AD)
- Maravarma Kulasekara I (fl. 13th century AD)

=== In Kerala ===
Medieval Chera rulers of Kerala (c. 9th - 12th century AD) were formerly referred to by scholars/historians as the "Kulasekharas" or the "Kulasekhara Perumals" (hence the "Kulasekhara dynasty"), based on the assumption that all of them bore the abhiṣekanāma (regnal title/name) "Kulasekhara". However, it is now known that not all of them held this specific title. Only two Chera Perumal rulers with the title "Kulasekhara" are currently known from archaeological and epigraphic evidence.

- Sthanu Ravi Kulasekhara (fl. 9th century AD)
  - Identified with Kulasekhara Alvar or Kulasekhara Varma
- Rama Kulasekhara (fl. late 11th century AD)

=== Kulasekhara dynasty ===
- The ruling lineage of the kingdom of Venad, who traced their ancestry to Rama Kulasekhara, the last Chera ruler of Kerala, was known as the "Kulasekhara dynasty" or the "Chera dynasty". Several Venad elders from the early 14th to the 18th century held the title "Kulasekhara Perumal".
- In the modern period, the rulers of Travancore, successors to the Venad rulers, were likewise referred to as the "Kulasekharas" or the "Kulasekhara dynasty".

== See also ==
- Kula Shaker, a British rock band inspired by Kulasekhara Alvar
