= Thottakkattu Madhaviamma =

Indian politician

Thottakkattu Madhavi Amma was one of the founding members of the first (1925) legislative council of the erstwhile state of Kochi (also known as Cochin), in India. She was the daughter of Diwan Peshkar of Cochin and the poet Thottakattu Ikkavamma. Madhavi Amma was the first woman to be an elected member of any legislature in India.

== Works ==
- Thatvachinda
