= Thoppumpady =

- Town
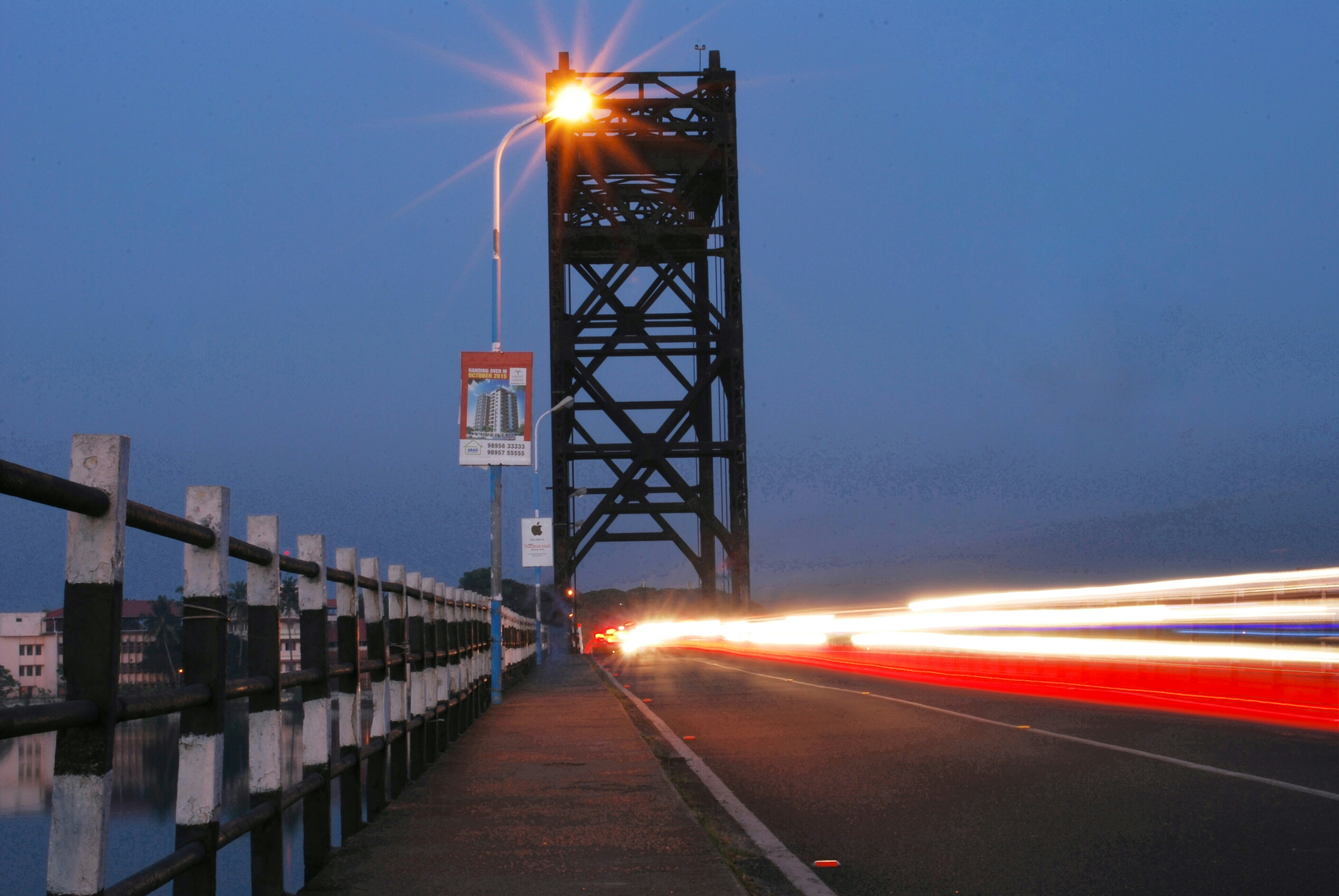
- Old Thoppumpady Bridge, at night

- Location in Kerala, India
- Coordinates: 9°56′7″N 76°15′33″E
- Country: India
- State: Kerala
- District: Ernakulam

Languages
  - Official: Malayalam, English
- Time zone: UTC+5:30 (IST)
- PIN: 682005
- Telephone code: 0484
- Vehicle registration: KL-43
- Nearest city: Kochi

Thoppumpady (Malayalam: [t̪oːpːumbɐɖi]) is a town of Kochi, Kerala. The Thoppumpady Bridge connects Willingdon Island with the Fort Kochi peninsula.

== Etymology ==
Combination of the Malayalam terms tōppŭ "grove" and paṭi "step".

== Geography ==
It is located at 9°56′7″N 76°15′33″E.

== How to reach ==
Thoppumpady is about 9 km away from the South Railway Station. It has bus services to particular locations in the city.

It is connected to the Willington Island via the Mattancherry Bridge built by the British in the pre-independence period popular among the local community as "Old Harbour Bridge" or "Pazhaya Thoppumpady Paalam" in the local dialect. This bridge is a classic work of the British engineering division. The centre of the bridge can be raised to let bigger boats pass under it. The new Mattancherry bridge built approximately one kilometer near it now carries most of the traffic from Thopumpady to the Willington Island. After a renovation by the Cochin Port Authority in 2015 the Old Harbour Bridge was re-opened for the public. However, due to safety concerns, government authorities permit only light motor vehicles to cross the bridge.

Thoppumpady is 3 km from Mattancherry and 5 km from Fort Kochi. Old NH 47 passes through Thoppumpady.

The old railway station, Harbour Terminus, is just down the Mattancherry Bridge. Only cargo trains come to this station. The Willingdon Island is connected via the Venduruthy Bridge to Thevara. Willington Islands is a government owned property. The major places on the island are the headquarters of the Southern Naval Command,Naval Airport, Cochin Port Trust, Central Institute of Fisheries Technology, Hotel Taj Malabar, Hotel Casino, and Hotel Trident. The major roads in Thoppumpady are Aroor Thoppumpady road also known as Old NH 47, PT Jacob road connecting Thoppumpady with SH66, kochupally road, Pallichal road, Tagore road etc.

== Economy ==
Cochin Fisheries Harbour, located at Thoppumpady, is one of the major fishing industries in the state. Marina mall, a kind of hypermarket is located at Thoppumpady.
