= Ramanthuruth =

- Island
- Location in Kerala, India Ramanthuruth (India)
- Coordinates: 9.9822121°N 76.258378°E
- Country: India
- State: Kerala
- District: Ernakulam

Languages
  - Official: Malayalam, English
- Time zone: UTC+5:30 (IST)
- Vehicle registration: KL-

Ramanthuruth is one of the islands that make up the city of Kochi, Kerala, India. The November 1967 amalgamation order of the Kerala Legislative Assembly declared Ramanthuruth Island as part of Kochi. Raman Thuruth, which falls under Ward 1 of the Kochi Corporation, used to be the smallest polling booth in the State. But during the 2015 local body election, the islanders travelled to Fort Kochi to exercise their franchise.
