= Cochin Port =

Major port in Kerala, India

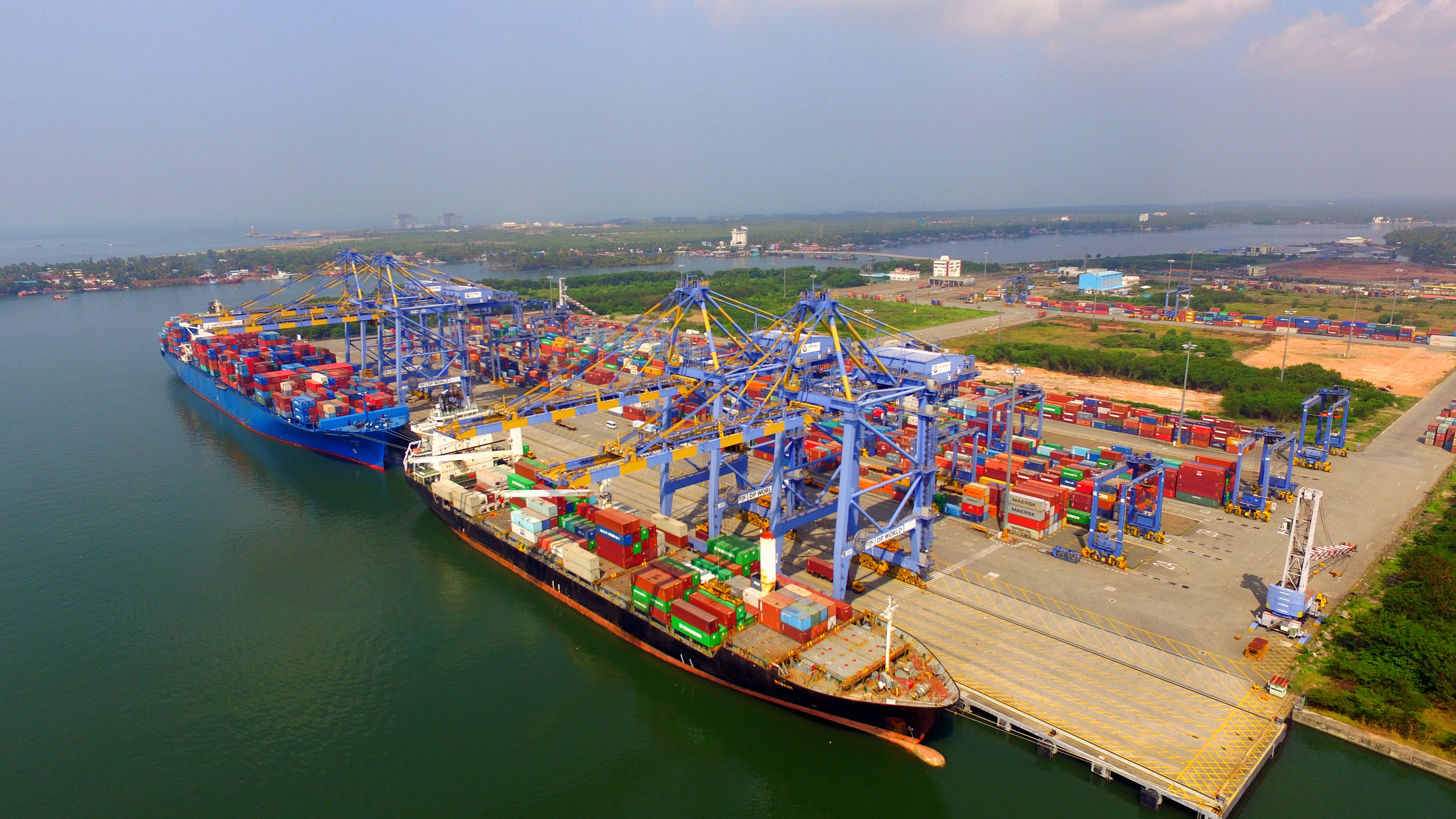
- Interactive map of Cochin Port

Location
- Country: India
- Location: Kochi, Kerala
- Coordinates: 9.96756°N 76.26816°E

Details
- Opened: 26 May 1928; 98 years ago
- Operated by: Cochin Port Authority and Dubai Ports World
- Owned by: Ministry of Ports, Shipping and Waterways, Govt of India
- No. of berths: 16
- No. of wharfs: 2
- Chairman: B. Kasiviswanathan IRSME

Statistics
- Annual cargo tonnage: ▲37.75 million tonnes (2024–25)
- Annual container volume: ▲834,665 TEU (2024–2025)
- Annual revenue: ▲₹ 7,269.8 million (2020–21)
- Vessels handled: ▲1,519 (2021–2022)
- Website www.cochinport.gov.in

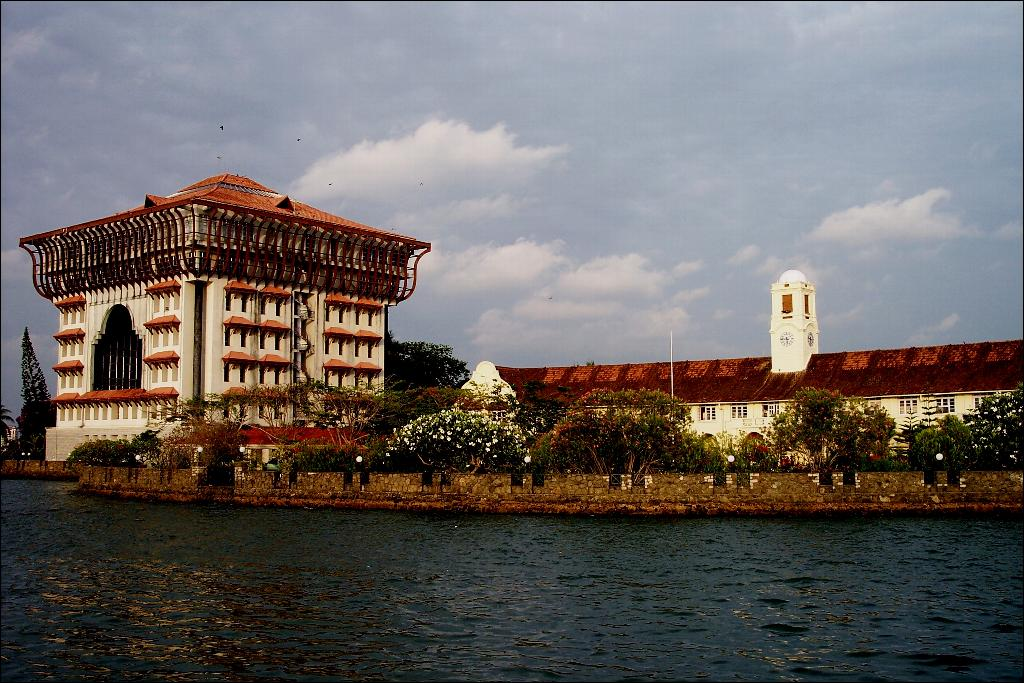
Office of the Cochin Port Trust in Willingdon Island

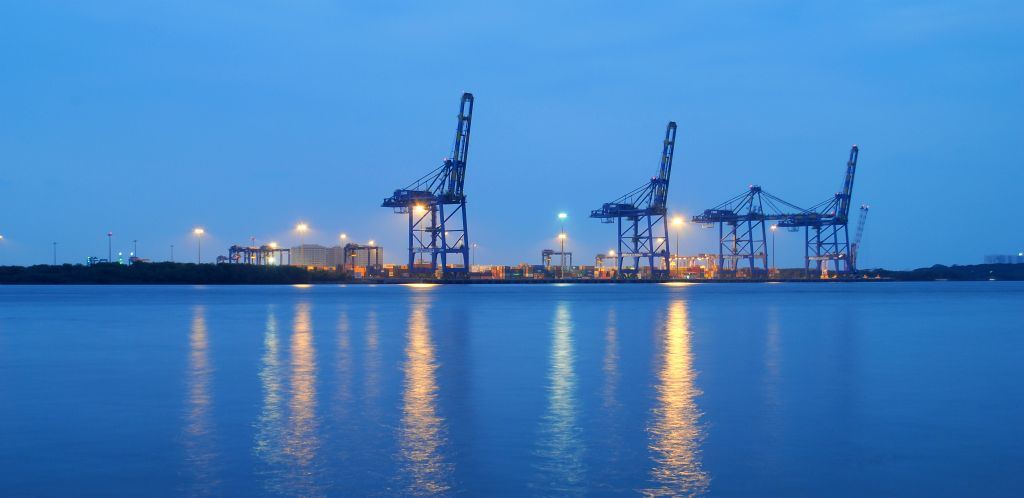
Evening view of International Container Trans-shipment Terminal (ICTT)

Cochin Port or Kochi Port is a major port on the Arabian Sea – Laccadive Sea – Indian Ocean sea-route in the city of Kochi in Ernakulam district in the state of Kerala and is one of the largest ports in India. The Vallarpadam container terminal, part of the Cochin Port, is the first transshipment terminal in India. The Cochin port lies on two islands in the Vembanadu Lake; Willingdon Island and Vallarpadam, towards the Fort Kochi river mouth opening onto the Laccadive Sea.

The port is governed by the Cochin Port Authority (CoPA), a Government of India establishment. It was established in 1928 and is nearing completion of its centenary of active service.

The Kochi Port is one of a line of maritime-related facilities based in the port-city of Kochi. The others are the Cochin Shipyard, the largest shipbuilding as well as maintenance facility in India; the SPM (single point mooring) facility of the Kochi Refineries, an offshore crude carrier mooring facility; and the Kochi Marina.

== History ==
The Cochin port was formed naturally due to the flooding of the Periyar River in 1341 AD, and, over time, has become a major flashpoint for trade. The port in its initial history attracted European merchants- predominantly Dutch and Portuguese- and was later expanded by the British with the establishment of Willingdon Island. The traditional port was near Mattancherry (which still continues as Mattancherry Wharf).

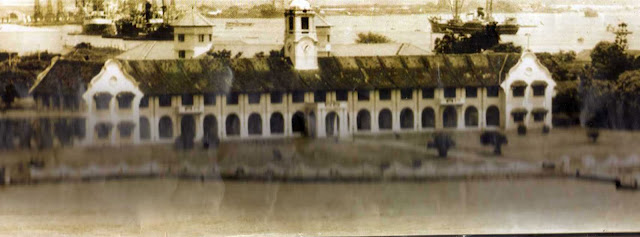
Cochin Port Trust in 1948

The idea of establishing a modern port in Cochin was first posited by Lord Willingdon during his governorship of the Madras Province. The opening of the Suez Canal allowed several ships to pass near the west coast and he felt it was necessary to build a modern port in the southern part as well. He selected the newly joined Sir Robert Bristow, a leading British harbour engineer, to head the project, and Bristow became chief engineer of Kochi Kingdom's Port Department in 1920. From that point forward until the port's completion in 1939, he and his team were actively involved in making a greenfield port. With extensive research spanning over a decade toward securing a permanent manmade port that could withstand monsoon erosion, he was convinced that it would be both feasible and largely beneficial to develop Kochi through its port. He believed that Kochi could become the safest harbour in India if the ships could enter the inner channel.

The challenge before engineers was a rock-like sandbar that stood across the opening of Kochi backwaters into the sea. Its density prevented the entry of all large ships (requiring more than eight or nine feet of water). It was thought that the removal of the sandbar was a technical impossibility, and the potential consequence on the environment was beyond estimation. Efforts that had been previously undertaken on this scale had led to ecological atrocities such as destruction of the Vypeen foreshore.

However, Bristow, after a detailed study of wind and sea current conditions, concluded that such issues could easily be avoided. He addressed the immediate problem of Vypeen foreshore's erosion by building granite groynes that were nearly parallel with the shore and overlapped each other. The groynes enabled a system of automatic reclamation which naturally protected the shore from monsoon seas. Spurred on by this success, Bristow planned out a detailed proposal of reclaiming part of the backwaters at a cost of ₹25 million (equivalent to ₹5.9 billion or US$63 million in 2026). An ad-hoc committee appointed by the Madras government examined and approved the plans submitted by Bristow.

The construction of the dredger Lord Willingdon was completed in 1925 and arrived in Kochi in May 1926. It was estimated that the dredger was put to use for at least 20 hours a day for the next two years to create a new island to house the Cochin Port and other trade-related establishments. Around 3.2 km^{2} of land was reclaimed in the dredging. Sir Bristow and his team had successfully completed the port when the steamship SS Padma, was given clearance for the newly constructed inner harbour of Kochi. Speaking to the BBC directly after the port's completion, Bristow proudly proclaimed: "I live on a large island made from the bottom of the sea. It is called Willingdon Island, after the present Viceroy of India. From the upper floor of my house, I look down on the finest harbour in the East." The Willingdon Island was artificially created with the mud sledged out for the harbour construction.

During World War II, the port was taken over by the Royal Navy to accommodate military cruisers and warships. The strategic importance of Cochin during the World Wars was one immediate reason for the construction of the harbour. It aided the British in resisting the Japanese threat, but it also proved crucial domestically in the shaping of Cochin as a modern urban space, reorganising local caste and labour relations. According to a recent study, "[t]the 20-year long project appropriated, modified, or undermined existing social institutions of labour recruitment, work processes, skills and local technologies. The large-scale appropriation and modification of local skills and labour recruitment and work process in this colonial project produced a space of disparity by reinforcing the pre-capitalist caste-based corecive labour relations. The project also involved a massive destruction and appropriation of the social spaces of the urban poor."

In 1932, the Maritime Board of British India declared the Port of Cochin as a major port and was opened to all vessels up to 30 feet draught. It was returned to civil authorities on 19 May 1945. After the Independence, the port was taken over by the government of India.

In 1964, the administration of the port was vested to a Board of Trustees under the Major Port Trusts Act. The port is currently listed as one of the 12 major ports of India.

In 2022, following the introduction of the Major Port Authorities Act 2021 superseding the Major Port Trusts Act 1963, Cochin Port Trust got renamed to Cochin Port Authority thereby adopting a new logo.

=== Chappa system ===
The Chappa system (also spelt Chaappa) was a method of recruiting workers to work in Kochi's ports in place between the 1930s and 1960s. During pre-dawn hours, people would gather around the house of the employer called "Mooppan" and he would throw metal tokens with the emblem of the concerned stevedore contractor engraved on it into the air which were called "chaappa" and only the individuals who caught a coin could work in the port for the day. Another method was eying the crowd and deliberately beckoning the men he eyed with his finger. These methods also existed in other places in India and elsewhere, it was "calling-on" in London). Violence was common where stout, burly men were elbowing and fighting the smaller and weaker men to get to the front and attract Mooppans attention. These systems were met with fierce protests in the 1950s and 1960s with incidences like the 1953 Mattancherry shootout where the police shot and killed 3 protesters demanding its removal, they were CX Antony, Said and Saithali.

== Organizational structure ==
Cochin Port Trust is an autonomous body under the government of India and is managed by board of trustees constituted by the government. The board is headed by the chairman who acts as the chief executive officer. The government may from time to time nominate the trustees in the board representing various interests. The chairman is assisted by the deputy chairman who in turn is assisted by department heads and officials of the following port departments:

- General Administration
- Traffic
- Finance
- Marine
- Civil Engineering
- Mechanical Engineering
- Medical

== Navigational channel ==
The entrance to the Port of Cochin is through the Cochin Gut between the peninsular headland Vypeen and Fort Kochi. The port limits extend up to the entire backwaters and the connecting creeks and channels. The approach channel to the Cochin Gut is about 1000-metre long with a designed width of 200 meters and maintained dredged depth of 14.5 meters (now dredging for 16 meters for ICTT).

From the gut, the channel divides into Mattancherry and Ernakulam channels, leading west and east of Willingdon Island respectively. Berthing facilities for ships have been provided in the form of wharves, berths, jetties & stream moorings alongside these channels.

== Infrastructure facilities ==
A draft of 30 ft is maintained in the Ernakulam channel along with berthing facilities, which enables the port to bring in larger vessels. In the Mattancherry channel a draft of 30 ft is maintained. The port provides round-the-clock pilotage to ships subject to certain restrictions on the size and draft. There is an efficient network of railways, roads, waterways and airways, connecting the Cochin Port with the hinterland centers spread over the states of Kerala, Tamil Nadu and Karnataka. Facilities for supply of water and bunkering to vessels are available.

== New initiatives ==
The CPT launched E-Thuramukham, a comprehensive enterprise resource planning implementation programme, becoming the first Indian port to do so. The project is based on SAP platform and will be customized by Tata Consultancy Services.

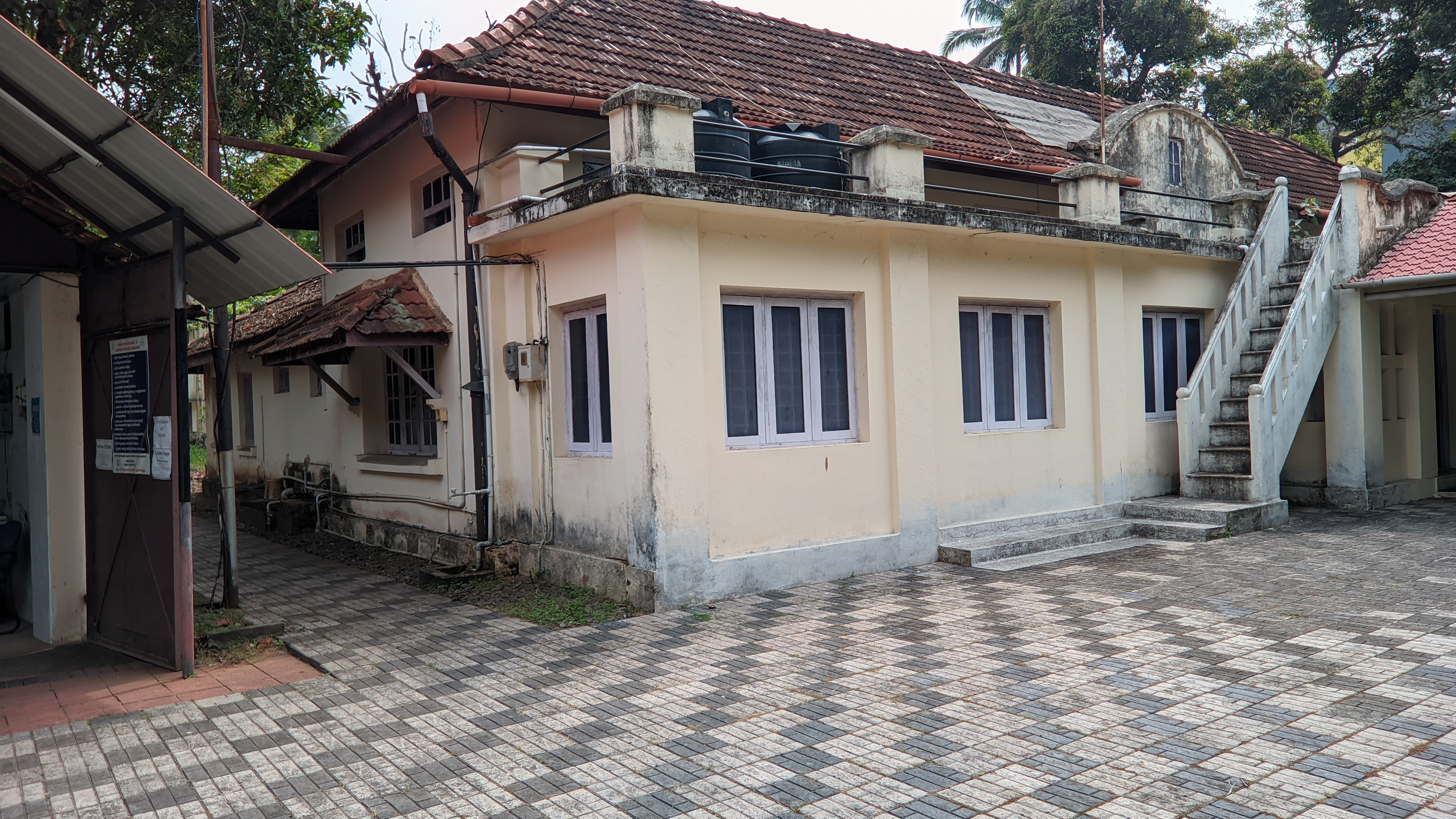
Cochin Port Maritime Heritage Museum

The Cochin Port Trust has set up the Maritime Heritage Museum in Willingdon Island where a collection of unique and rare navigational equipments and photographs connected with the saga of construction of Cochin Port during 1920-40 period are on display. The exhibits reveal the hardships faced by Sir Robert Bristow and his workforce, who developed the port amidst financial constraints and without technology support.

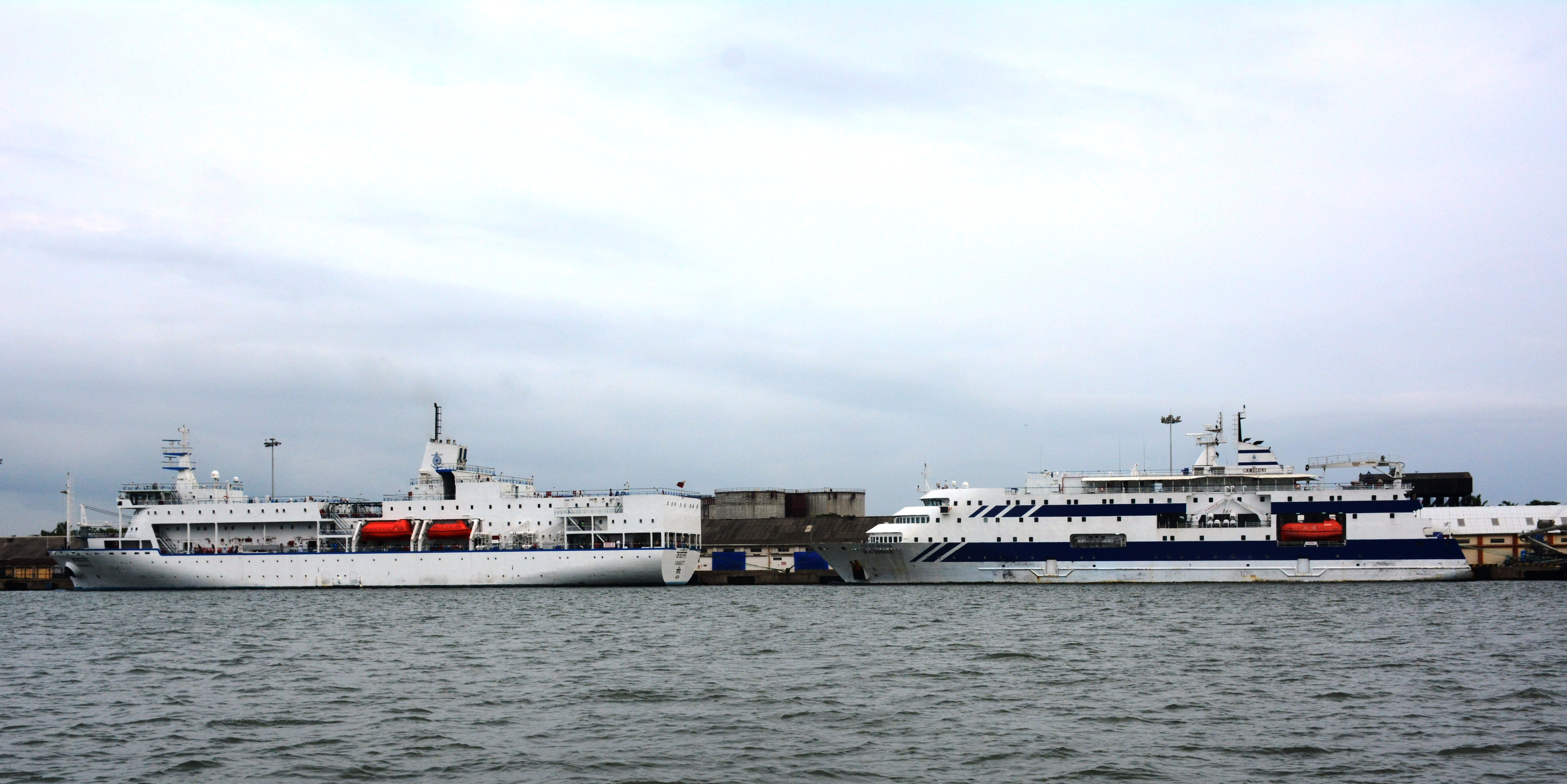
MV Kavaratti with MV Corals docked at Cochin Port in 2017

== Popular culture ==
- The 2023 Malayalam film Thuramukham is based on the condition of the Kochian port during the Chappa system.

== See also ==
- Transport in India
- List of ports in India
  - Sagar Mala project
  - Ports in Kerala
    - Cochin Port Maritime Heritage Museum
    - Vizhinjam International Seaport Thiruvananthapuram
    - International Container Transshipment Terminal, Kochi
