= Willingdon Island =

Artificial island in Kerala, India

Coordinates: 9°57′N 76°16.5′E

- Island
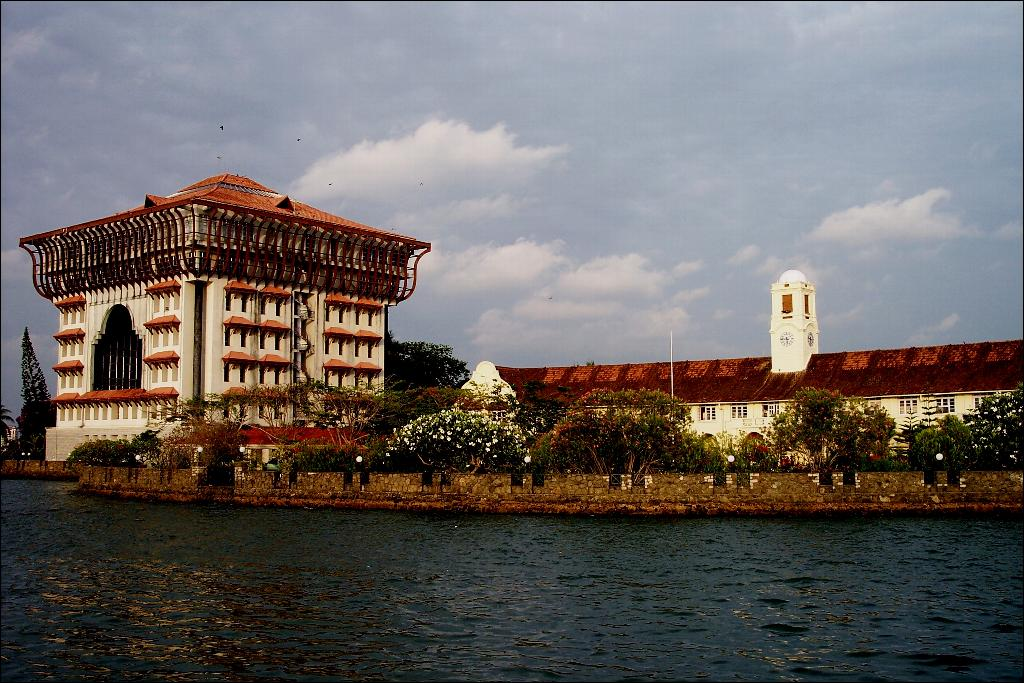
- Office of the Cochin Port Trust in Willingdon Island

- Location in Kerala, India Willingdon Island (India)
- Country: India
- State: Kerala
- Established: 1928
- Founder: Robert Bristow
- Named for: Lord Willingdon

Government
  - Body: Kochi Municipal Corporation

Area
  - Total: 782.97 ha (1,934.8 acres)
- Elevation: 4 m (13 ft)

Population (2020)
  - Total: 17,224
  - Density: 2,099/km^{2} (5,440/sq mi)

Languages
  - Official: Malayalam, English
- Time zone: UTC+5:30 (IST)
- PIN: 682003
- Nearest city: Kochi

Willingdon Island is the largest artificial island in India, which forms part of the city of Kochi, in the state of Kerala. The island covers an area of 782.97 hectares (7.83 km^{2}) between Fort Kochi and the Ernakulam mainland. Much of the present Willingdon Island was claimed from the Vembanadu Lake, filling in dredged soil around a previously existing, but tiny, natural island. Willingdon Island is significant as the home for the Port of Kochi as well as the Kochi Naval Base, the Southern Naval Command of the Indian Navy, Plant Quarantine station, Custom House Cochin and Central Institute of Fisheries Technology, a constituent unit of Indian Council of Agricultural Research.

The island is also home for other establishments associated with the port, namely, the Office of the Kochi Port Trust (that controls the Port of Kochi), the Customs Office, the Mercantile Marine Department and more than two dozen export-import offices, warehouses, a few hotels and business centers. The Cochin Port Maritime Heritage Museum and the Taj Malabar Resort & Spa are located on the island.

== History ==
=== Conception ===
The idea of developing a new port in Kochi was first felt by Robert Bristow, who was appointed by Willingdon, then-the Governor of Madras Presidency, to create a new modern port on the West coast of India at Kochi.

=== Construction ===
The island was created during the construction of the modern port in 1936, with the soil dredged out while deepening the Vembanad Lake to accommodate the new port. It was named after The 1st Earl of Willingdon, the Viceroy of India at the time, who commissioned the project. Robert Bristow, the chief protagonist and engineer for the project, owned the first building on the island.

The first liner, which belonged to the Bibby Line, arrived on the island on 9 March 1935. A port hostel, called Malabar Hotel, was built for passengers who wished to rest on the island.

All the pre-planned basic port structure was completed in 1939, just in time for the Second World War. A deep wharf, a rail bridge, and a road bridge to the mainland provided valuable infrastructure for the local war effort. A naval works was also constructed on the adjacent Venduruthy Island to the south, where, by the end of the war, they were busily constructing landing craft for the presumed invasion of Japan. In 1940 a passenger jetty and customs house were built adjoining the hotel, together with a passenger platform and rail siding.

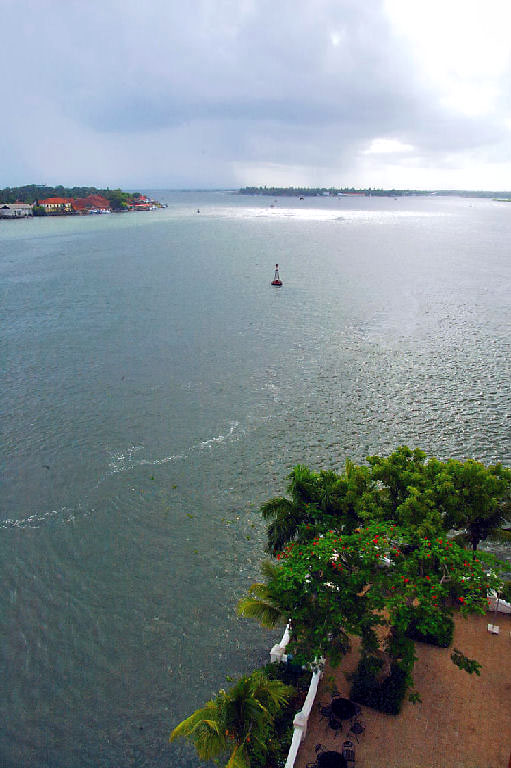
View from Vivanta by Taj - Malabar Hotel in Willingdon Island.

=== British military use ===
The Royal Air Force quickly found a use for this flat expanse of conveniently located virgin territory, and constructed a large aerodrome. The artificial island thus became a thriving military base. The Malabar Hotel provided quarters for all the wartime staff and the building gained a new administrative block next door to it. It was taken over from the RAF by the Royal Navy on 1 October 1942, and recommissioned as HMS Garuda. It was a Royal Navy Aircraft repair yard with a capacity of 180 aircraft until being decommissioned on 1 April 1946. A new post office, an open-air swimming bath between the hotel and offices, and a branch bank adjoining both completed the amenities.

=== Since 1947 ===
Control of the transport hub was transferred from the British Empire to India in 1947 when the latter gained independence. During its short colonial tenure the island had handled at most one million tons of freight, by 1960 this had almost doubled. The island aerodrome was extensively developed and became the city's modern military-cum-civilian airport. When Kochi got an International Airport at Nedumbassery, 25 km (16 mi) north-east of the city, the civilian enclave of the Island airport was shut down. The airport continued as the naval air station INS Garuda. The remaining space on the island was quickly utilized in the 1950s, and far from being an unnatural appendage of the picturesque and ancient city, the isle, left behind by the British so soon after its completion, became the commercial heart of the ancient metropolis of Cochin.

Cochin is a major port in India, and Willingdon Island is a landmark. The Island is connected to the mainland by Venduruthy Bridge, which has road and railway links. There are two railway stations on the Island - the Mattancherry Halt and the Cochin Harbour Terminus. The headquarters of the Southern Naval Command of the Indian Navy is located on the island. Cochin shipyard is also located near this island. It is also a major tourist center. Willingdon Island is also home to several hotels and offices of clearing agents.

Apart from these, the Island has a dry dock, a fire station, tank farms, a hospital and places of worship. The Port Health Organisation functions on the Island and it works towards the prevention of entry of Quarantinable diseases. Cochin Chamber of Commerce and Industries is strategically placed here, as is the Government of India Tourist Information Office in the vicinity of the airport. This island is a hub of international trade. A number of port offices, branches of national and international banks, travel agencies, souvenir shops, and warehouses. Employees of the Cochin Port and Custom House live on the island. For the benefit of these families and those on the Naval Base, there are five schools and a Kindergarten. Three of these schools belong to the Kendriya Vidyalaya groups of schools.

== Reaching the island ==
Willingdon Island is connected to the mainland through the Mattanchery Bridge and Venduruthy Bridge. Many passenger boats operate daily to the island from Mattancherry, Fort Kochi, Vypin, and Marine Drive. The island can also be reached via national highway 47A, which is the shortest national highway in India.

== Gallery ==
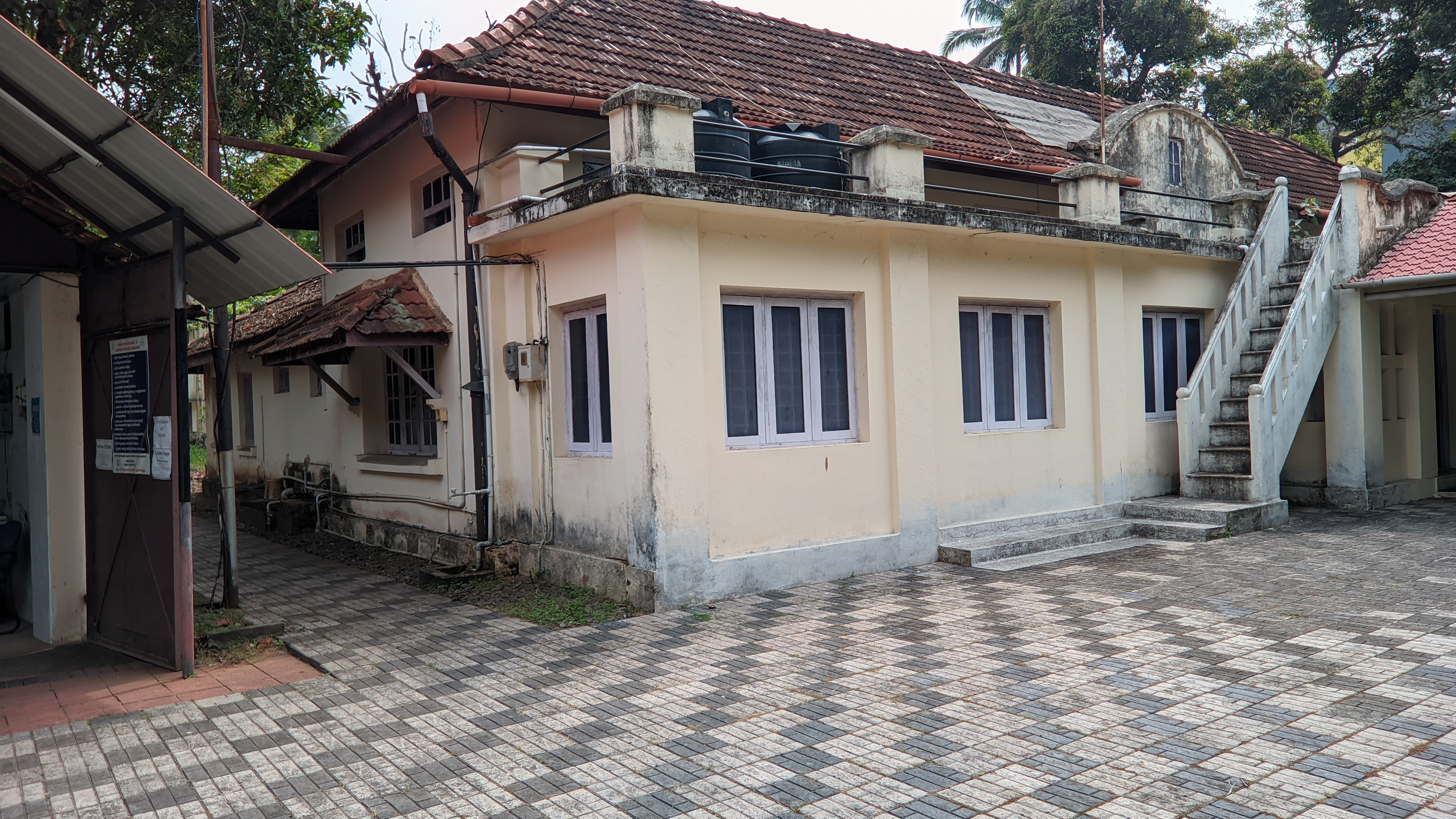
Cochin Port Maritime Heritage Museum

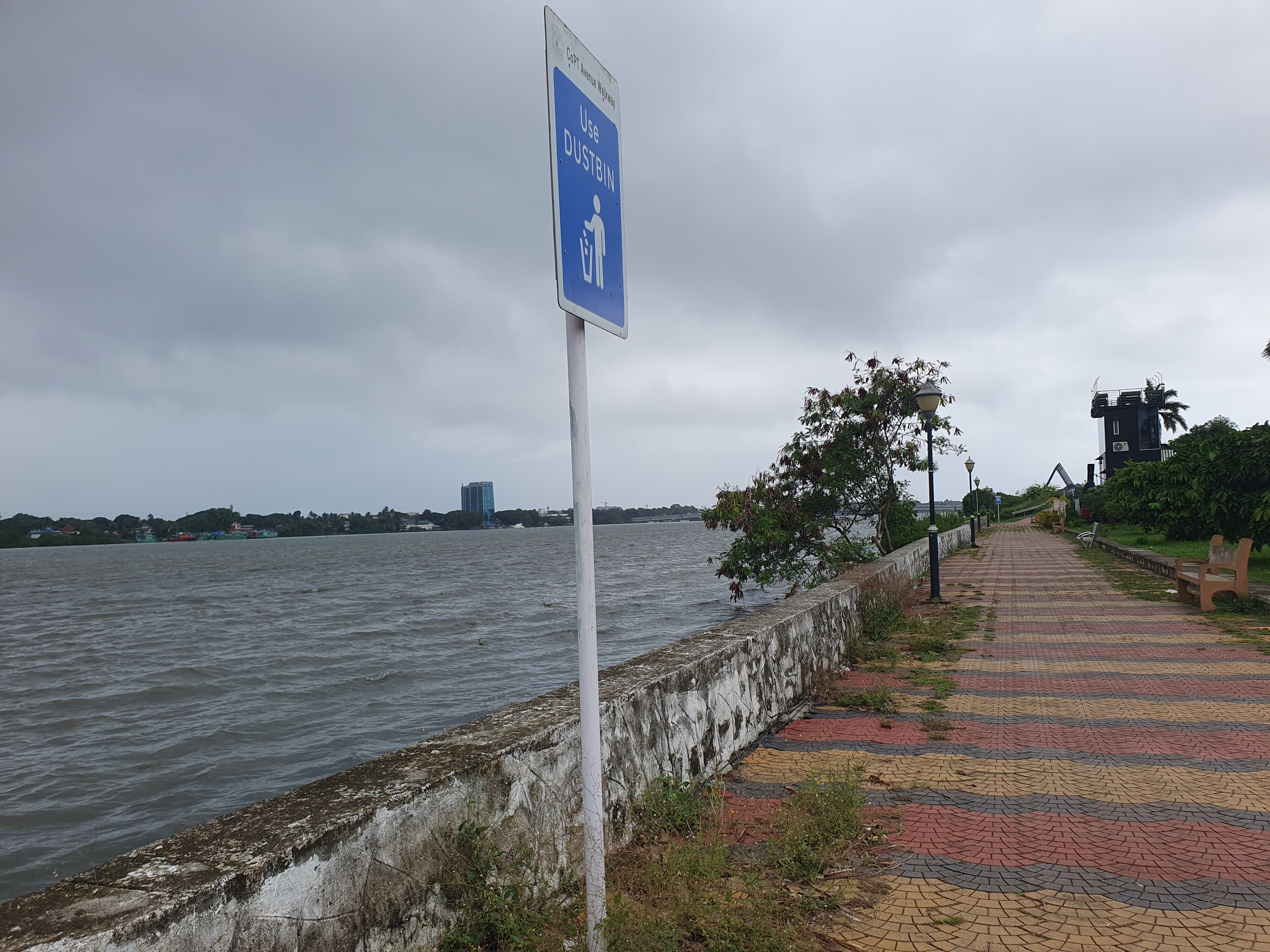
View from Willingdon Island.

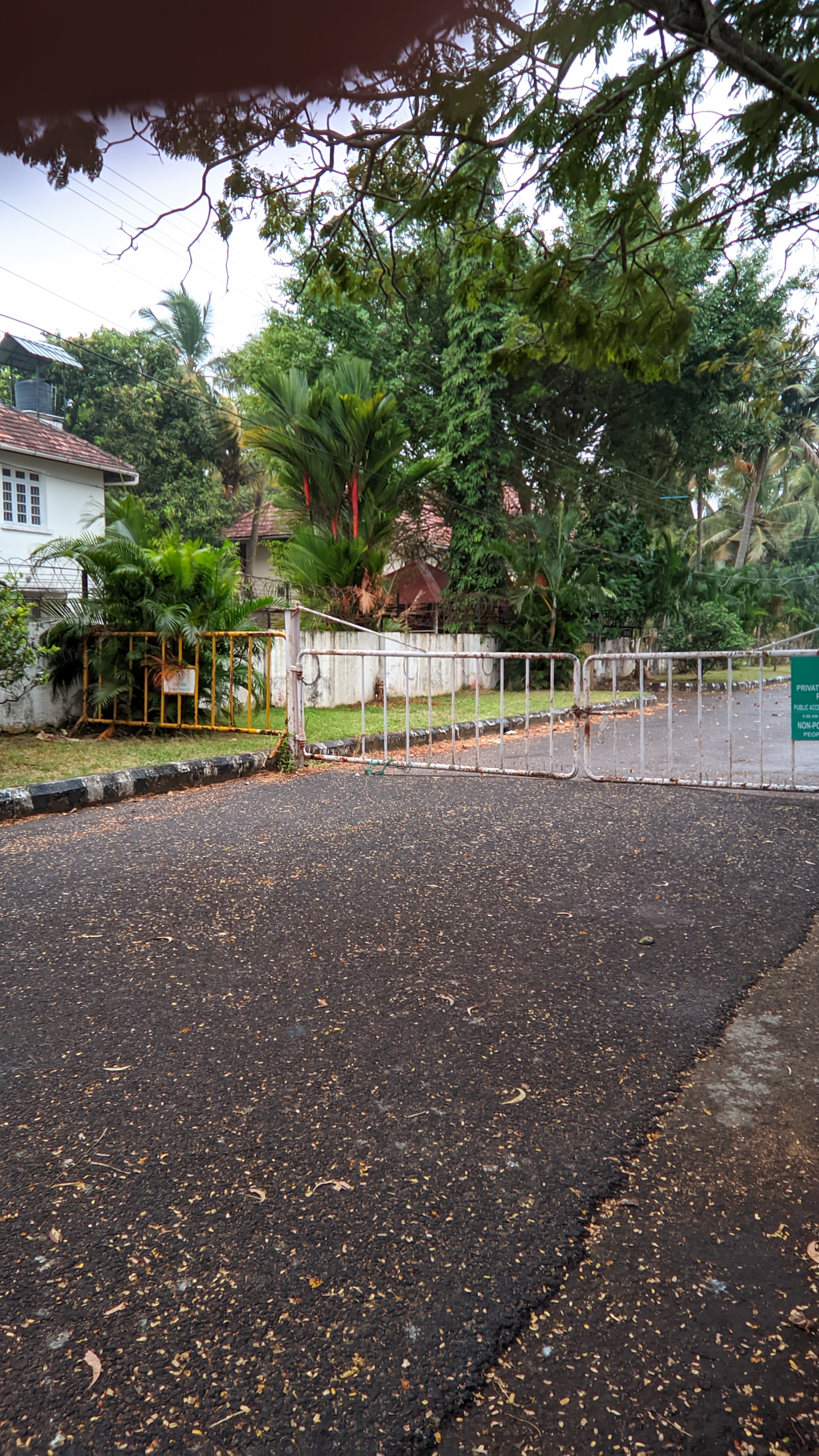
Entry of Malabar Road at embarkation jetty of Willingdon Island

== See also ==
- Venduruthy Bridge
- Vathuruthy
- Mattancherry Bridge
- History of Kochi
- Cochin Port Maritime Heritage Museum
