= Places of worship in Cherthala =

== Temples ==
- Kothakattu Sree Dharma sastha Temple- Kokkothamangalam
- Sree Shanmukha Vilasam Kshethram Near Manaveli Jn.2 km from NH47
- Karthayayani Devi Temple, at the heart of Chertala town
- Padinjare Kottaram SreeDharmasastha Temple, 3km West from Chertala town
- Kollapally Sree Maheswaripuram Temple (Sree Chakra Prathishtta) 5 km North of Cherthala town
- Kandamangalam Sree Rajarajeshwari Temple, Kadakkarappally.
- Sakthi Vinayaka Temple, Thankey Jn, Kadakkarappally
- Velorvattom Mahadevar Temple, Velorvattom, 1 km West of Cherthala town
- Puthumana Sree Krishna Swamy Temple
- Sree Shanmuka Swamy Temple, Cherthala CMC 23
- Kuttikattu Sree Bhadra Kali Devi Temple
- Muttathu Thirumala Devasom Lakshmi Narasimha Temple, Chertala town
- Varanaadu Bhagavathy Temple, Varanaadu
- Kottaram Sri Dharmasastha Temple, Near Ottapunna, NH47 bypass
- Kadambanadu Sri Devi Temple, CMC-1, Cherthala
- Maruthorvattom Sree Dhanvanthri Temple, Maruthorvattom
- Vellappally Sree Dharma Daiva Kshetram, Maruthorvattom
- Kandmangalam Devi temple, Kandmangalam, 4 km from Town on Cherthala-Thanky-Anthakaranazhi road
- Mutharamman Kovil, near railway station
- Nalpathenneeswaram Sree Mahadeva Temple, Panavally -One of the 108 Shiva temples supposed to be built by Parasurama
- Thrichattukulam Mahadeva Temple, Panavally
- Marappallil Devi Temple, Perumpalam Junction, Panavally
- Thiruvizha Sree Mahadevar Temple, Tiruvizha
- Thuruthummel Paradevatha Temple, Thiruvizha
- Alunkal Althara sree Krishna SwamiTemple, Thiruvizha 18 Jn, Thiruvizha
- Parassery Paradevatha Temple, Thiruvizha
- Kochiravely Dakshinamoorthy Temple, Thiruvizha North
- Kunnath Sri Khandakarna Temple, Cherthala South
- Mavunkal Gopalakrishna Swami Temple, Kanichukulagara PO, Thiruvizha
- Varakadi Sree Parvathy Devi Temple
- Mahadevar Temple, Mararikulam
- Kayikkara Temple
- Thayyil Sakthipuram Temple
- Ayyappanchery Dharma Sastha Temple
- Thycattuserry Bhagavathy Temple, Thycattussery
- Sreekandeswaram Mahadevar Temple, Poochakkal
- Mahadevar Temple, Pattanakkad, 6 km North of town on NH 47 - One of the 108 Shiva temples supposed to be built by Parasurama
- Kanichukulangara devi temple, Kanichukulanghara
- Thuravoor Narashimha Moorthy-Sudharshana Moorthy Mahakshethram, Thuravoor, 12 km North of town on NH 47
- Thuravoor Tirumala Devasom Lakshmi Narasimha Temple, Thuravoor
- Nalukulanghara Bhagavathi Temple, Parayakad, Thuravoor
- Karthayayani Devi temple- Aroor - 20 km North of town on NH 47
- Sree Palliyarakkavu Devi Temple, Aroor.
- Kalavancodam Saktheeswara Temple, famous for kannadi prathista, 6 km north on Kalavancodam-Saktheeswara road
- Sivasubrahmanyapuram Temple, Nadubhagom, Thycattussery
- Kadambanakulangra Temple, Pallippuram
- Subrahmanya Temple, Puthanambalam
- Kochanakulangara Bhagavathy Temple, Kayippuram, Muhamma
- Nagamkulangara Temple, Vayalar
- Puthiyakavu Devi Temple, Puthiyakavu, Uzhuva
- Chammanad Devi Temple, Chammanad
- Kizhakke Chammanad Durga Devi Temple, Chammanad
- Punnakkezhil Devi Temple, Thycattussery
- Lakshmi Narayana Temple, 1 km west of Manorama Jn.
- Vazatharaveli Annapoorneswari Temple, Panavally
- Arackal Naga Raja Temple, Near Koottuveli, Mayithara
- Sooryankunnu Bhadrakali Temple, Panavally
- Mutharamman Kovil, Kambikkal junction, Cherthala town
- Pallippuram Kadavil Sree Maha Lekshmi Temple, Pallippuram
- Kadathuruth Srimahadavi Temple, Valamngalam, Thuravoor
- Shree Bhadra vilasam vadakkumkara temple, K.R. Puram
- Cheruvaranam sreenarayanapuram temple, Cheruvaranam (Puthanambalam)
- Vijnana Sandhayani Shree Mahavishnu temple, SNDP Br. No. 715 Cherthala
- Parambil Bhadrakaali Temple near Koottuveli
- Devankal Mahavishnu Temple, Puthiyakavu
- Puthiyakavu Devi Temple
- Sasthankal Sree Darmasastha Temple, Puthiyakavu
- chettichaveedu devi Temple kannankara
- Thiruayranikkulam Kalathil Mahadeva temple pallippuram
- vellimuttam sreedhrma sastha temple
- Vilanjoor Mahadeva Temple Kodamthuruth, കുത്തിത്തോടെ
- Chalinarayanapuram maha kshethram, Thaneermukkom

== Churches ==
- St. Mary's Forane Church, Muttom, Cherthala P O, Alappuzha.
- St. George Church, Arthinkal- 8 km southwest from town on Cherthala-Thanky-Thumboly road
- St. Andrew's Basilica Church (Arthunkal palli), Arthinkal- 8 km southwest from town on Cherthala-Thumpoly-Alappuzha road
- St. Thomas Church, Thumpoly (Thumpoly Church). Alappuzha-Arthunkal-chellanam-kochi Coastal Road.
- St. Stephen's CSI Church, Kalavancodam
- St. Mary's Forane Church, Thankey -5 km north from Town on Cherthala-Thanky-Anthakaranazhi road
- St. Mary's Fornane Church, Pallippuram -8 km north from Town on Arookkutty road
- St. Thomas Church, Kizhakkummury, Chethala; 2 km from Cherthala KSRTC Bus Station, on Thannermukkom road
- St. Joseph's Church, Thirunnalloor. 5 km north from Cherthala Town on Arookutty road
- St. Augustine Church and Pontifical Seminary, Manapuram - 15 km north from Town on Arukutty-Cherthala road
- St. Thomas Church, Kokkamangalam - 6 km southeast from town on Cherthala-Thanneermukkom-Muhamma road
- St. Martín de Porres Church, Vadakkumuri- 2 km west from town near Kizhekkenalpathil
- St. Sebastian's Church, Maruthorvattom, NH 66,4 km from Cherthala
- St. Joseph church, kuncharam, Panavally, north Cherthala
- St. Ann's Church, Uzhuva, Kalavamkodam, Cherthala
- Little flower church, Ayiramtahi, Thayckal. 8 km southwest from town on Cherthala-Thanky-Thumboly road
- St. Francis Assisi Church, Thyckal. 8 km southwest from town on Cherthala-Thanky-Thumboly road
- St. Joseph's Church, Thuravoor
- St. Michael's Church, Kavil, Pattanakad P. O. 8 km from Cherthala town con. 9947166161.
- St. Joseph Church, Kunnumpuram, Pattanakad P.O Cherthala.
- St. Antony's Church, Muttathiparambu, Cherthala
- St. Thomas Church, Nedumbrakkad, Cherthala

== Mosques ==
- Cherthala Town Central Juma Masjid, Near Manorama Kavala, Cherthala
- Thaickal Juma Masjid, Thaickal, Cherthala
- Aroor Mahal Muslim jamath near Chandiroor new bridge
- Jeelani Masjid Eramalloor
- Chandiroor Palam Masjid
- Varekatt Juma Masjid Chandiroor
- Masjidul Aman Aroor
- Karukathala Thaykkavu Chandiroor
- Rifaee Juma Masjid Eramalloor
- Fareediya Masjid Chandiroor
- Kaithavalappu Thaykkavu Chandiroor
- Kattupuram Palli Juma Masjid, Vaduthala Jetty
- Huda Masjid, Vaduthala Jetty
- Ansar Masjid, Arookutty
- Hidayathul Islam Masjid, Hidayath Jn., Vaduthala Jetty
- Kombanamury Masjid, Arookutty
- Town Juma Masjid, Vaduthala Jn.
- Masjidul Manar, Puthiyalapalam
- Nadvathul Islam Masjid, Naduvath Nagar
