= Panavally =

Panavally (പാണാവള്ളി) പാണാവള്ളി
- Poochakkal
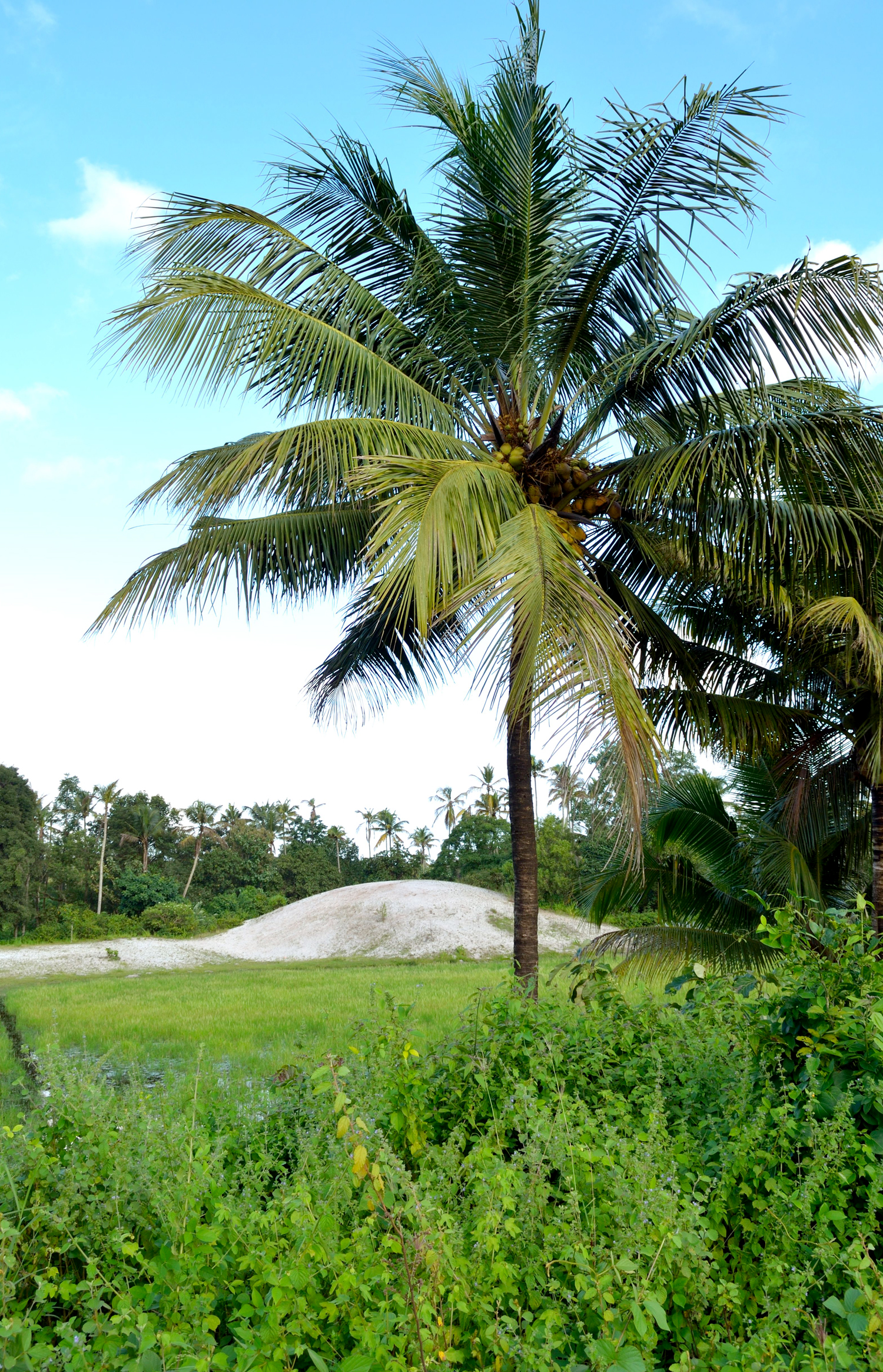
- View of Pachara Manal
- Interactive map of Panavally (പാണാവള്ളി)
- Coordinates: 9.817170°N 76.350990°E
- Country: India
- State: Kerala
- District: Alappuzha
- Talukas: Cherthala

Government
  - Body: Panchayat

Languages
  - Official: Malayalam, English
- Time zone: UTC+5:30 (IST)
- PIN: 688526 Poochakkal S O
- Telephone code: 0478
- Vehicle registration: KL-32
- Lok Sabha constituency: Alappuzha
- Niyamasabha constituency: Aroor
- Civic agency: Panchayat

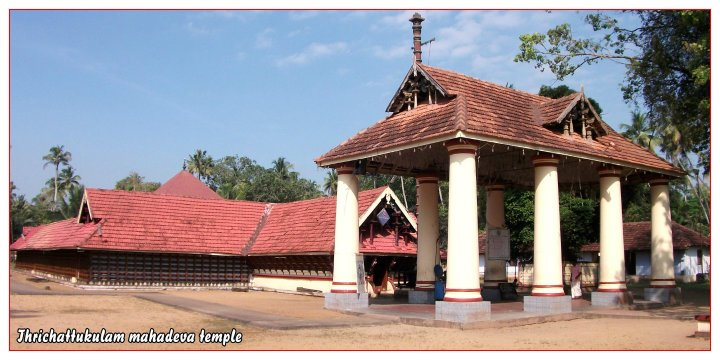
Thrichattukulam temple

Panavally(പാണാവള്ളി) is a village in India that is located in the northern part of Cherthala taluk and Alappuzha district in the state of Kerala. It is about a 25-minute (19 km) drive from Kochi city.

== Geography ==
Panavally is a village on the northern end of Alappuzha district. It spans from Arookutty on the northern side to Poochackal on the southern side Arookutty was the northern frontier of Travencore which separated it with old Kochi. The old customs house and the summer palace of Travencore King, which is overlooking the backwaters are still there. Different branches of the backwaters of Vembanad surround the village. Geographically, this area is part of the seashore sector of Kerala. The soil and other eco system show, like many regions of Kerala, that this part of the land emerged from the sea, few centuries ago. The sand in the southern part of this village is a great source of special silica sand, containing high concentration of pure silica. This was being used in many industries, in particular in brick (white) making and in glass industries. Southern end is the town Poochakkal, which is a part of this village as well as Thycattuserry village.

== Transportation ==
The Cherthala-Arookutty-Aroor Temple Poochakkal- Vytilla Mobility Hub Kaloor bus route goes through this village and runs parallel to the national highway NH 66.

== Economy ==
The economy in general is agriculture based, but equally supported by the seafood processing industry. Due to the proximity to the Cochin city, this village supplies workforce to the city as well.

== Educational and cultural institutions ==
Major educational institutions are NSS Higher secondary & LP school, Trichattukulam. SNVHSS & BEd College, Sreekandeswaram. Govt LP school Odampally.

== Sports ==
Red star arts and SNS Thaliyaparambu club has played a major role in shaping up the cultural and sports scenario of the village and at least three or four generations have received contributions from this organization.

== Buildings and other notes ==
Poochakkal Police Station, Poochakkal Treasury, Poochakkal Medical Centre PMC, Panavally sub Registrar office, Thycattussery Block Panchayath Office and Poochakkal KSEB are in this village.
