= P. Thilothaman =

Indian politician

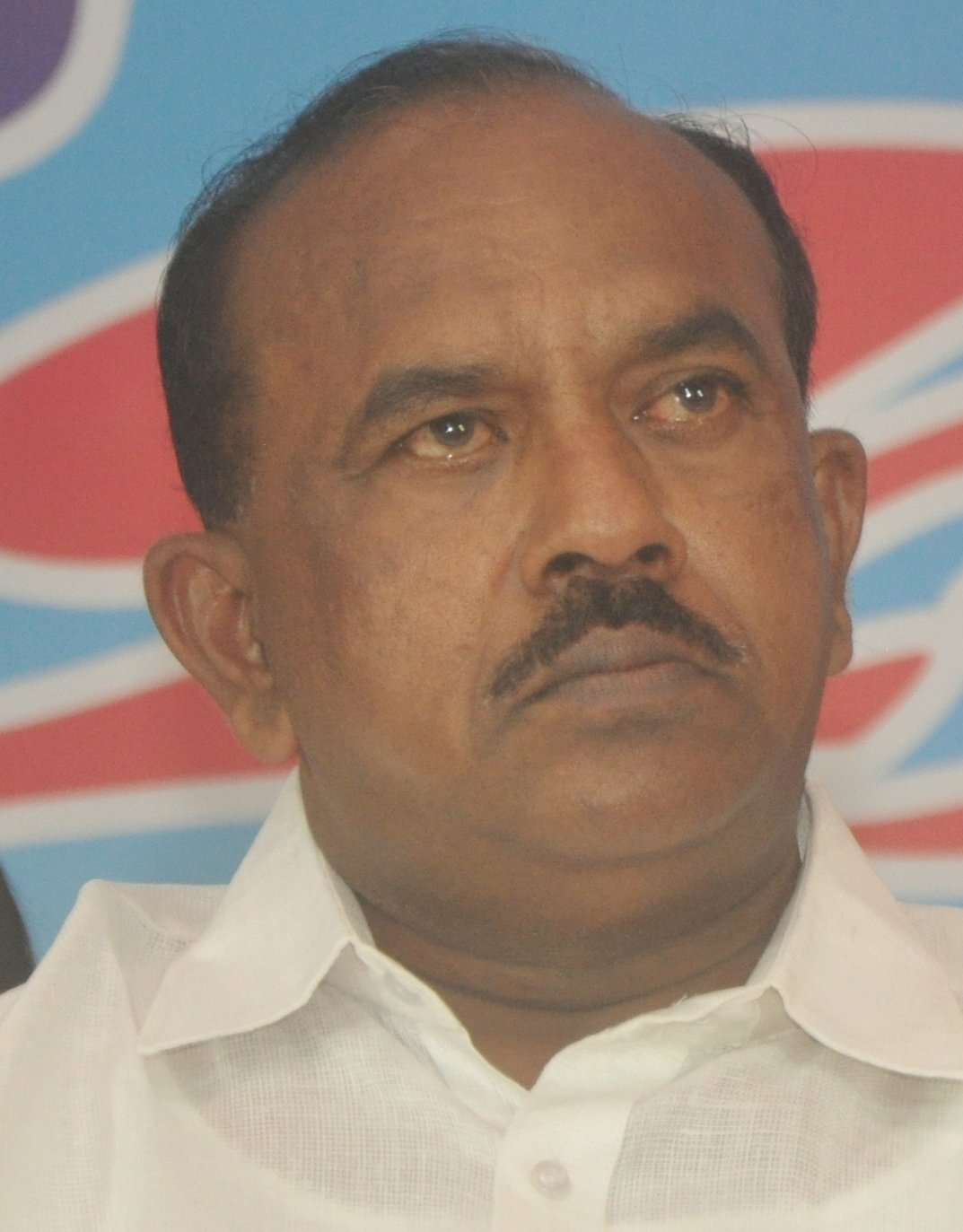
- P. Thilothaman

Minister for Food and Civil Supplies Department, Kerala
- In office 25 May 2016 – 3 May 2021
- Preceded by: Anoop Jacob
- Succeeded by: G. R. Anil

Member of Kerala Legislative Assembly
- In office 11 May 2006 – 2 May 2021
- Preceded by: A. K. Antony
- Succeeded by: P. Prasad
- Constituency: Cherthala

Personal details
- Born: 2 November 1957 (age 69) Cherthala, Alappuzha, Kerala, India
- Party: Communist Party of India
- Spouse: Usha V.
- Children: 2
- Parents: Parameswaran; Gowry

Parameswaran Thilothaman (born 2 November 1957) is an Indian politician. He served as a member of the 14th Kerala Legislative Assembly and former minister for Food and Civil Supplies Department of Kerala. He belongs to Communist Party of India and represented Cherthala constituency. He was previously elected to Kerala Legislative Assembly in 2006 and 2011.

== Political life ==
He started his political career during college days. He joined Communist Party of India in 1977. He was the state vice president of All India Youth Federation. He served as the president of Cherthala South Grama Panchayat (1995–96) and as the vice president of Coir-Fed. He was the Thaluk President of Theeradesa Matsya Chumattu Thozhilali Union and Union Secretary of Cherthala Mandalam Committee.

== Positions held ==
- Member, C.P.I. State Council; Executive Member; C.P.I District Committee
- State President, Coir Workers Federation (AITUC)
- President, Cherthala Toddy Workers Union (A.I.T.U.C.)
- President, Cherthala Coir Factory Workers Union, K.L.D.C. Employees Association and Cherthala Taluk Ration Dealers Association

== Personal life ==
He was born on 2 November 1957 at Cherthala. He is the son of Parameswaran and Gowry. He has a Bachelor of Arts degree. He is married to Usha V and has two children Amritha & Arjun.
