= Chammanad Devi Temple =

Hindu temple in Alappuzha district, Kerala

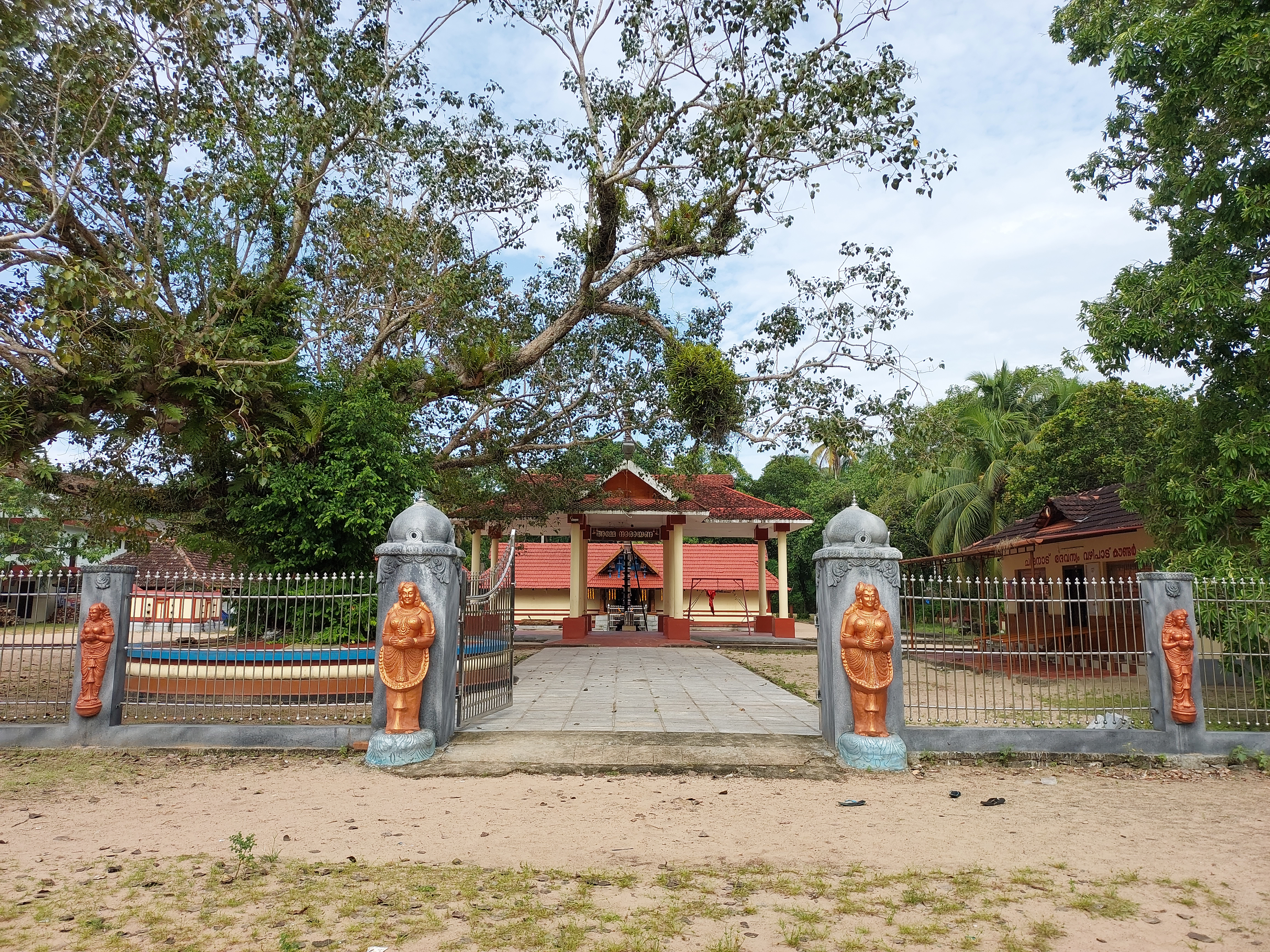

- Bhadrakali Devi Temple, Chammanadu, Kodamthuruth, Ezhupunna, Alappuzha, Kerala

Religion
- Affiliation: Hinduism
- District: Alappuzha
- Deity: Bhadrakali
- Festival: Utsavam in the Malayalam month of Kumbha

Location
- Location: Chammanadu, Kodamthuruth, Ezhupunna
- State: Kerala
- Country: India
- Interactive map of Chammanad Devi Temple
- Coordinates: 9°48′33.5″N 76°18′39.2″E

Architecture
- Type: Architecture of Kerala

Specifications
- Temple: One
- Elevation: 26.43 m (87 ft)

Chammanad Devi Temple or Chammanad Bhadrakali Temple is a temple located 200 metres from the National Highway, between Vyttila and the town of Cherthala (16 km from each place). It is situated in Kodamthuruth neighbourhood of Alappuzha, Kerala in India. The 10-day festival Utsavam is celebrated in Kumbha month.

There are two sub temples:

Shasta Temple - Near the E.C.E.K. Union High School.
Sri Krishna Temple - Located around 700 metres towards Eramalloor, at a place called Kannukulangara.

The temple belongs to a resident family known as the "Ettu veettil kartha family", which is functionally now eight families and their sub-families only, along with their recommended members run the temple.
