= Vayalar (name) =

Vayalar is both a given name and a surname. Notable people with the name include:

- Vayalar Ramavarma (1928–1975), Indian poet and lyricist
- Vayalar Ravi (born 1937), Indian politician
- Vayalar Sarath Chandra Varma (born 1960), Malayali lyricist and poet
