= Cherthala Assembly constituency =

Constituency of the Kerala legislative assembly in India

Cherthala
- Constituency No. 103 for the Kerala Legislative Assembly
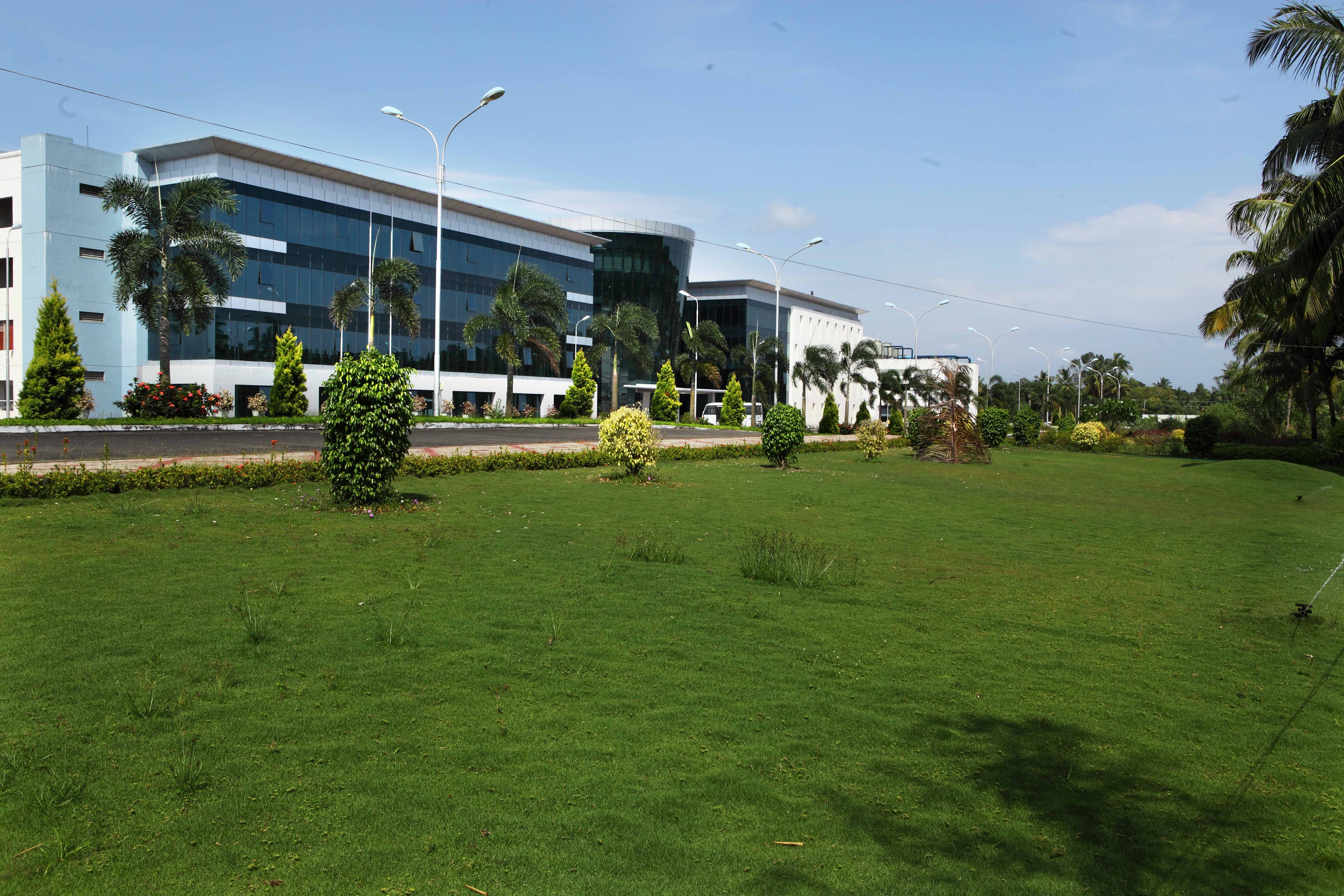
- Infopark, Cherthala

Constituency details
- Country: India
- Region: South India
- State: Kerala
- District: Alappuzha
- Lok Sabha constituency: Alappuzha
- Established: 2008
- Total electors: 2,04,830 (2016)
- Reservation: None

Member of Legislative Assembly
- 16th Kerala Legislative Assembly
- Incumbent P. Prasad
- Party: CPI
- Alliance: LDF
- Elected year: 2026

Cherthala State assembly constituency is one of the 140 state legislative assembly constituencies in Kerala in southern India. It is also one of the seven state legislative assembly constituencies included in Alappuzha Lok Sabha constituency. The current MLA is P. Prasad of CPI.

== Local self-governed segments ==
Cherthala Assembly constituency is composed of the following local self-governed segments:

Name	Status (Grama panchayat/Municipality)	Taluk
Cherthala	Municipality	Cherthala
Cherthala South	Grama panchayat	Cherthala
Kadakkarappally	Grama panchayat	Cherthala
Kanjikuzhy	Grama panchayat	Cherthala
Muhamma	Grama panchayat	Cherthala
Pattanakkad	Grama panchayat	Cherthala
Thanneermukkom	Grama panchayat	Cherthala
Vayalar	Grama panchayat	Cherthala

== Members of Legislative Assembly ==
Travancore Legislative Assembly 1948

Sherthalai I - P. V. Urumese Tharakan

Sherthalai II - P. K. Raman

Sherthalai III (General) - Krishnan Ayyappan

Sherthalai III ( Latin Catholic) - Joseph Mathen

Travancore Cochin Legislative Assembly

1. C. K. Kumara Panicker 1952
2. K. R. Gouri 1954

The following list contains all members of Kerala Legislative Assembly who have represented the constituency:

Key

CPI CPI(M) INC Independent

Election	Niyama Sabha	Member	Party	Tenure
1957	1st	K. R. Gowri Amma	CPI	1957 – 1960
1960	2nd	K. R. Gowri Amma	CPI	1960 – 1965
1965	-	C. V. Jacob	KEC	
1967	3rd	N. P. Thandar	CPI(M)	1967 – 1970
1970	4th	A. K. Antony	INC	1970 – 1977
1977	5th	M. K. Raghavan	INC	1977 – 1980
1980	6th	P. S. Sreenivasan	CPI	1980 – 1982
1982	7th	Vaylar Ravi	Independent	1982 – 1987
1987	8th	Vaylar Ravi	INC	1987 – 1991
1991	9th	C. K. Chandrappan	CPI	1991 – 1996
1996	10th	A. K. Antony	INC	1996 – 2001
2001	11th	A. K. Antony	INC	2001 – 2006
2006	12th	P. Thilothaman	CPI	2006 – 2011
2011	13th	P. Thilothaman	CPI	2011 – 2016
2016	14th	P. Thilothaman	CPI	2016-2021
2021	15th	P. Prasad	CPI	2021-2026
2026	16th	P. Prasad	CPI	Incumbent

== Election results ==
Percentage change (±%) denotes the change in the number of votes from the immediately previous election.

=== 2026 ===
2026 Kerala Legislative Assembly election: Cherthala
Party	Candidate	Votes	%	±%
CPI	P. Prasad	83,216	48.32	▲1.32
INC	K. R. Rajendra Prasad	68,727	39.91	▼3.64
BDJS	Adv. T. P. Anantharaj	17,997	10.45	▲2.27
Independent	Nandakumar	455	0.27	
Independent	A. P. Prasad	366	0.21	
Independent	Rajendra Prasad	249	0.15	
Independent	Adv. Sonnymon K. Mathew	190	0.11	
NOTA	None of the above	1,021	0.59	
Margin of victory		14,489	8.47	
Turnout		1,72,221		
CPI hold		Swing	▲1.32	

=== 2021 ===
There were 2,13,276 registered voters in the constituency for the 2021 Kerala Assembly election.

2021 Kerala Legislative Assembly election: Cherthala
Party	Candidate	Votes	%	±%
CPI	P. Prasad	83,702	47.00	▲1.30
INC	S. Sharath	77,554	43.55	▲1.90
BDJS	Adv. P. S. Jyothis	14,562	8.18	▼2.86
BSP	Vayalar Jayakumar	613	0.34	▼0.14
NOTA	None of the above	602	0.34	▼0.05
Independent	Sarath S. Kannattuveli	501	0.28	
Independent	V. A. Shahjahan	201	0.11	
Independent	Karthikeyan	193	0.11	
Independent	Sonymon K. Mathew	169	0.09	▼0.11
Margin of victory		6,148	3.45	▼0.60
Turnout		1,78,097	83.51	▼3.22
CPI hold		Swing	▲1.30	

=== 2016 ===
There were 2,04,830 registered voters in the constituency for the 2016 Kerala Assembly election.

2016 Kerala Legislative Assembly election: Cherthala
Party	Candidate	Votes	%	±%
CPI	P. Thilothaman	81,197	45.70	▼7.41
INC	S. Sarath	74,001	41.65	▼0.18
BDJS	P. S. Rajeev	19,614	11.04	▲7.38
BSP	C. P. Thilakan	845	0.48	▼0.25
NOTA	None of the above	687	0.39	−
Independent	S. Sarath	639	0.36	
Independent	Sonnymon K. Mathew	348	0.20	
Independent	Vayalar Rajeevan	174	0.10	
Independent	K. V. Joseph	150	0.08	
Margin of victory		7,196	4.05	▼7.23
Turnout		1,77,655	86.73	▲1.68
CPI hold		Swing	▼7.41	

=== 2011 ===
There were 1,90,806 registered voters in the constituency for the 2011 election.

2011 Kerala Legislative Assembly election: Cherthala
Party	Candidate	Votes	%	±%
CPI	P. Thilothaman	86,193	53.11	▲1.55
JSS	K. R. Gowri Amma	67,878	41.83	▼1.82
BJP	Adv. P. K. Binoy	5,933	3.66	▲0.11
BSP	K . R. Rajeevan	1,185	0.73	−
Independent	Shajimon	1,094	0.67	
Margin of victory		18,315	11.28	▲3.37
Turnout		1,62,283	85.05	▲5.75
CPI hold		Swing	▲1.55	

=== 2006 ===
There were 1,35,676 registered voters in the constituency for the 2006 election.

2006 Kerala Legislative Assembly election: Cherthala
Party	Candidate	Votes	%	±%
CPI	P. Thilothaman	55,626	51.56	▲5.73
INC	C. K. Shajimohan	47,092	43.65	▼8.14
BJP	Sajeevlal	3,833	3.55	
Independent	Shajimon	804	0.75	
Independent	Chacko George	194	0.18	
AIADMK	Raveendran	178	0.16	
Independent	Uthaman	169	0.16	
Margin of victory		8,534	7.91	▲1.95
Turnout		1,07,900	79.30	▼2.35
CPI gain from INC		Swing	▲5.73	

=== 2001 ===
There were 1,41,109 registered voters in the constituency for the 2001 election.

2001 Kerala Legislative Assembly election: Cherthala
Party	Candidate	Votes	%	±%
INC	A. K. Antony	59,661	51.79	▼0.41
CPI	C. K. Chandrappan	52,801	45.83	▲1.33
JD(U)	Adv. N. Hariharan	1,415	1.23	
Independent	K. N. Sinimol	715	0.62	
Independent	T. C. Antony	421	0.37	▼0.03
Independent	Rajendra Prasad	192	0.17	
Margin of victory		6,860	5.96	▼1.64
Turnout		1,15,220	81.65	▼4.35
INC hold		Swing	▼0.41	

=== 1996 ===
There were 1,28,441 registered voters in the constituency for the 1996 election.

1996 Kerala Legislative Assembly election: Cherthala
Party	Candidate	Votes	%	±%
INC	A. K. Antony	56,691	52.2	▲4.1
CPI	C. K. Chandrappan	48,306	44.5	▼4.5
BJP	S. Padmakumar	2,163	2.0	▼0.6
Independent	T. C. Antony	437	0.4	
PDP	M. A. Kareem	420	0.4	
Independent	Ravi	301	0.3	
Independent	C. V. Muraleedharan Nair	147	0.1	
Independent	Jayagopalan Om Pillai	125	0.1	
Margin of victory		8,385	7.6	▲6.7
Turnout		1,10,505	86.0	▲3.3
INC gain from CPI		Swing	▲4.1	

=== 1991 ===
There were 1,26,734 registered voters in the constituency for the 1991 election.

1991 Kerala Legislative Assembly election: Cherthala
Party	Candidate	Votes	%	±%
CPI	C. K. Chandrappan	50,884	49.0	
INC	Vayalar Ravi	49,853	48.1	
BJP	P. K. Induchoodan	2,692	2.6	
Independent	Gopalakrishnan	321	0.3	
Margin of victory		991	0.9	
Turnout		1,04,754	82.7	
CPI gain from INC		Swing		

== See also ==
- Cherthala
- Alappuzha district
- List of constituencies of the Kerala Legislative Assembly
- 2016 Kerala Legislative Assembly election
