= Joseph C. Panjikaran =

Indian Catholic monsignor, historian, theologian and journalist (1888–1949)

Venerable Joseph C. Panjikaran
- Born: 10 September 1888; Ujuva
- Died: 4 November 1949

Joseph C. Panjikaran, born 10 September 1888 in Ujava, died 4 November 1949) of Shertallay was a Syro-Malabar Catholic priest, historian and journalist. He founded the Dharmagiri Hospital, Kothamangalam, and the Congregation of the Medical Sisters of St. Joseph.

== Life ==
Joseph C. Panjikaran was born on 10 September 1888 in the village of Uzhuva, in the diocese of Ernakulam as the son of Chacko Panjikaran and Mariam Kanichattu.

Panjikaran obtained a M.A degree from St. Joseph’s College Trichy in 1913. He joined the diocesan seminary at Candy (Sri Lanka) and was ordained to priesthood priest in 1918. Panjikaran became the director of the Vicariate of Ernakulam for the propagation of the faith. He believed that the Church had a responsibility to provide medical care to the poor and sick. He He believed that the church had responsibility to provide medical services to the poor and the sick and devoted his work especially to people of lower casts. He opened a hospital named Dharmagiri at Kothamangalam, Kerala in 1934 and founded the congregation of Medical Sisters of St. Joseph in 1944.

He died of a heart attack on 4 November 1949 and was buried at the cemetery attached to Dharmagiri. His beatification process was initiated by the Diocese of Kothamangalam in 2010.
