= P. S. Karthikeyan =

Indian politician (1918–1983)

PS Karthikeyan
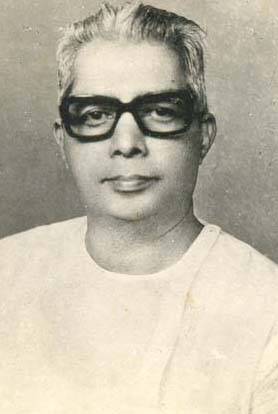
- Late Shri PS Karthikeyan

Personal details
- Born: January 1, 1918 Cherthala, Kerala, India
- Died: January 24, 1983 Cherthala, Kerala, India
- Party: Indian National Congress
- As of January 19, 2012

P. S. Karthikeyan (January 1918 – January 24, 1983) was an Indian politician who was a member of the Kerala Legislative Assembly. He was a member of the Indian National Congress. Former Secretary, S.N. Trust, Former Director of SNDP Yogam.
