= A. K. Antony =

23rd Defence Minister Of India And Former Chief Minister of Kerala

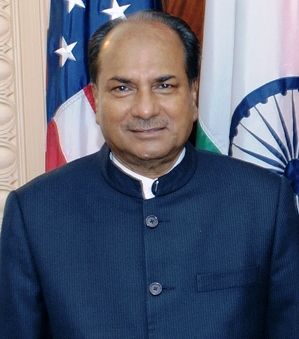
- A. K. Antony as the Minister of Defence in 2009

23rd Union Minister of Defence
- In office 26 October 2006 – 26 May 2014
- Prime Minister: Manmohan Singh
- Preceded by: Pranab Mukherjee
- Succeeded by: Arun Jaitley

Chief Minister of Kerala
- In office 17 May 2001 – 29 August 2004
- Preceded by: E. K. Nayanar
- Succeeded by: Oommen Chandy
- In office 22 March 1995 – 9 May 1996
- Preceded by: K. Karunakaran
- Succeeded by: E. K. Nayanar
- In office 27 April 1977 – 27 October 1978
- Preceded by: K. Karunakaran
- Succeeded by: P. K. Vasudevan Nair

Leader of Opposition in Kerala Legislative Assembly
- In office 20 May 1996 – 13 May 2001
- Preceded by: V. S. Achuthanandan
- Succeeded by: V. S. Achuthanandan

Union Minister Of Civil Supplies, Consumer Affairs & Public Distribution
- In office 18 January 1993 – 8 February 1995
- Prime Minister: P. V. Narasimha Rao
- Preceded by: P. V. Narasimha Rao
- Succeeded by: Buta Singh

Member of Parliament, Rajya Sabha
- In office 30 May 2005 – 2 April 2022
- Constituency: Kerala
- In office 3 April 1985 – 22 March 1995
- Constituency: Kerala

Member of the Kerala Legislative Assembly
- In office 1996–2005
- Constituency: Cherthala
- In office 1995 – 1996
- Constituency: Tirurangadi
- In office 1977 – 1979
- Constituency: Kazhakootam
- In office 1970 – 1977
- Constituency: Cherthala

President of the Kerala Pradesh Congress Committee
- In office 1987–1992
- Preceded by: C. V. Padmarajan
- Succeeded by: Vayalar Ravi
- In office 1972–1977
- Preceded by: K.K. Viswanathan
- Succeeded by: S. Varadarajan Nair

Personal details
- Born: Arackaparambil Kurien Antony; 28 December 1940 (age 85) Cherthala, Travancore (present day Alappuzha district, Kerala, India)
- Party: Indian National Congress (Before 1978; 1982–present); Indian National Congress-Urs (1978–1980); Indian National Congress-A (1980–1982)
- Spouse: Elizabeth Antony
- Children: Anil K Antony; Ajith Antony
- Education: Maharaja's College, Ernakulam; Government Law College, Ernakulam

Arackaparambil Kurien Antony (born 28 December 1940) is an Indian lawyer, attorney and statesman who was the longest serving Defence Minister of India (Note: AK Antony served as Dence Minister of India, from year 2006 to year 2014.) from 2006 to 2014. One of the senior leaders of the Indian National Congress, he currently serves as the Chairman of the Disciplinary Action Committee of the All India Congress Committee, Congress Working Committee, and member of the Congress Core Group and Central Election Committee.

He previously served as the Chief Minister of Kerala from 1977 to 1978, 1995 to 1996 and again from 2001 to 2004. During his first two terms, he was not a Member of the Legislative Assembly at the time of taking office- he was subsequently elected to the Assembly through by-elections. At 36, he became the youngest person to hold the office. He was the Leader of the Opposition in the Kerala Legislative Assembly from 1996 to 2001. He held the post of Union Minister of Civil Supplies from 1993 to 1995. Additionally, he also served as Treasurer of All India Congress Committee from 1994 to 1995.

He served as five terms as a Member of the Rajya Sabha. He was also elected to the Kerala Legislative Assembly on five occasions from the constituencies of Cherthala (1970, 1996 and 2001), Kazhakootam (1977) and Tirurangadi (1995).

== Early life and education ==
A. K. Antony was born at Cherthala, near Alleppey in Travancore as the son of Arackaparambil Kurien Pillai and Aleykutty Kurian. His father died in 1959 and Antony self-financed part of his education through odd jobs.

Antony completed his primary education at Holy Family Boys High school (Lower primary) and Government Boys High school (Upper primary), Cherthala (Note: Both are mixed higher secondary schools now and the latter has changed its name to Sree Narayana Memorial Government Higher Secondary school) and completed his Bachelor of Arts from Maharaja's College, Ernakulam and Bachelor of Law from Government Law College, Ernakulam.

== Political career ==
Antony entered politics as a student leader in Cherthala Taluk (Alappuzha District) as an activist of the Kerala Students Union under the guidance of M. A. John. He has been an active leader of many strikes like Oru Ana Samaram (Single Penny Strike). He became the youngest president of Kerala Students Union in 1966 and also served in the Kerala Pradesh Congress Committee (KPCC) before becoming an All India Congress Committee (AICC) General Secretary in 1984. When he became KPCC president in 1972, he was the youngest person to hold that post. He was elected again as KPCC president in 1987, and was defeated by Vayalar Ravi in the KPCC presidential elections in 1991.

Election	Constituency	Result	Majority
1970	Cherthala	Won	360
1977 (Note: Won a Bye-election)	Kazhakootam	Won	8669
1995 (Note: Won a Bye-election)	Tirurangadi	Won	22269
1996	Cherthala	Won	8385
2001	Cherthala	Won	6860

=== Congress politics and party faction ===
Antony founded the Congress (A) political party when he split from the Indian National Congress (Urs), a splinter group of the Indian National Congress The party was primarily active in Kerala and joined the LDF ministry headed by E. K. Nayanar during 1980–1982. After the fall of the Nayanar ministry, the party merged with the Congress in 1982, but Antony was not given any office until the death of Indira Gandhi. The members of the party have continued as a faction in the local congress afterwards.

== Chief Minister of Kerala ==
Following accusations in the Rajan case, K. Karunakaran resigned and Antony, the state Congress president was appointed as the sixth Chief Minister of Kerala, on 27 April 1977 becoming the youngest Chief Minister of the state at the age of 36. Antony subsequently contested a by-election from Kazhakuttam constituency in Thiruvananthapuram as he was not a member of the assembly and won by healthy margin of over 8 thousand votes. However, differences of opinion with Indira Gandhi and Karunakaran, especially over the emergency soon cropped up, leading to a fracture in the state Congress legislature party, with the two factions being led by Antony and Karunakaran respectively. Eventually, exactly one and half years after he had been sworn in as Chief Minister, he resigned from the post as well as the Congress party following its decision to field Indira Gandhi as the candidate in the by-election in Chikmagalur, Karnataka.

Antony had to wait for over 15 years before becoming Chief Minister for a second term; again, on the back of Karunakaran's resignation this time over the controversial ISRO spy case. On 22 March 1995, after a week-long deadlock, Antony was sworn in as Chief Minister, despite stiff opposition from Karunakaran. This term also lasted only one year before the United Democratic Front led by Antony narrowly lost the assembly elections in May 1996. Thereafter, Antony served as Leader of Opposition in the Kerala Legislative Assembly from 1996 to 2001.

In 2001, Antony led the United Democratic Front to a historic victory of 100 seats, with the Congress party winning its largest share of seats in the state assembly. On 17 May 2001, a triumphant Antony was sworn in as Chief Minister; for the first time, he was already serving as an MLA before taking the mantle of Chief Ministership.

However, his third term was extremely rocky and unstable, with Karunakaran refusing to cooperate with him and trying every tactic to overthrow him from office. This led to an erosion of public support as well as credibility. By the 2004 Lok Sabha elections, the Congress was a badly divided house and Antony had the disgrace of leading the party to its worst electoral performance since 1967. The final nail on the coffin was the defeat of K. Muraleedharan, the Electricity Minister in Antony's cabinet (incidentally Karunakaran's son) in the Wadakkanchery by-election, a seat widely perceived to be a Congress bastion. with his back on the wall, Antony had no option but to resign as Chief Minister. He was succeeded by his close confidante, Oommen Chandy.

It was at Antony's behest that the decision to construct the new Legislature Complex was taken in 1977. During his tenure, he introduced the Unemployment Allowance, Festival Allowance for the State Employees, Prohibition of Arrack and the steps initiated to revive the economy of Kerala. Several initiatives were taken in the fields of Higher education, science & technology, Biotechnology (including the Rajiv Gandhi Centre for Biotechnology at Thiruvananthapuram), and Information technology, under his ministries.

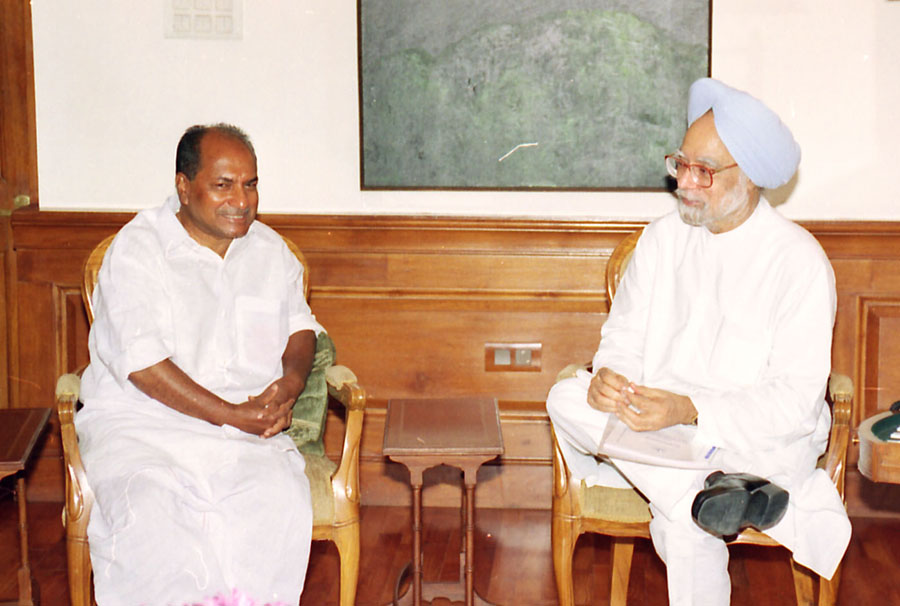
Chief Minister of Kerala A.K Antony with 13th Prime Minister of India Manmohan Singh in June 2004

It was also under his rule that the Kannur University was inaugurated by bifurcating the University of Calicut. The University of Sanskrit was founded in 1994. The Indian Institute of Management and the National Institute of Technology at Kozhikode were established in the years 1996 and 2002 respectively. The Akshaya project was implemented in 2002 by providing E-literacy to the people those who haven't it and opening Akshaya centres in the remote rural areas of the state, thus ensuring Internet availability all over the state, aiming to make Kerala the first complete E-literate state of India. Several initiatives were taken in the fields of Higher education, science & technology, Biotechnology, and Information technology, under his ministries. The Infopark at Kochi was established in the year 2004. The IT@school project and introduction of Information Technology in school level were initiated in 2001 by Third Antony ministry, making Kerala the first Indian state to do so.

Antony carried out Asian Development Bank aided "Modernisation of Government Plan". He also liberalised education by allowing several private engineering and medical colleges to open in Kerala and championed the state as an investment destination. He also ordered the closure of the Kerala Coca-Cola plant in 2004 citing drought and the non-availability of drinking water.

== Government offices ==
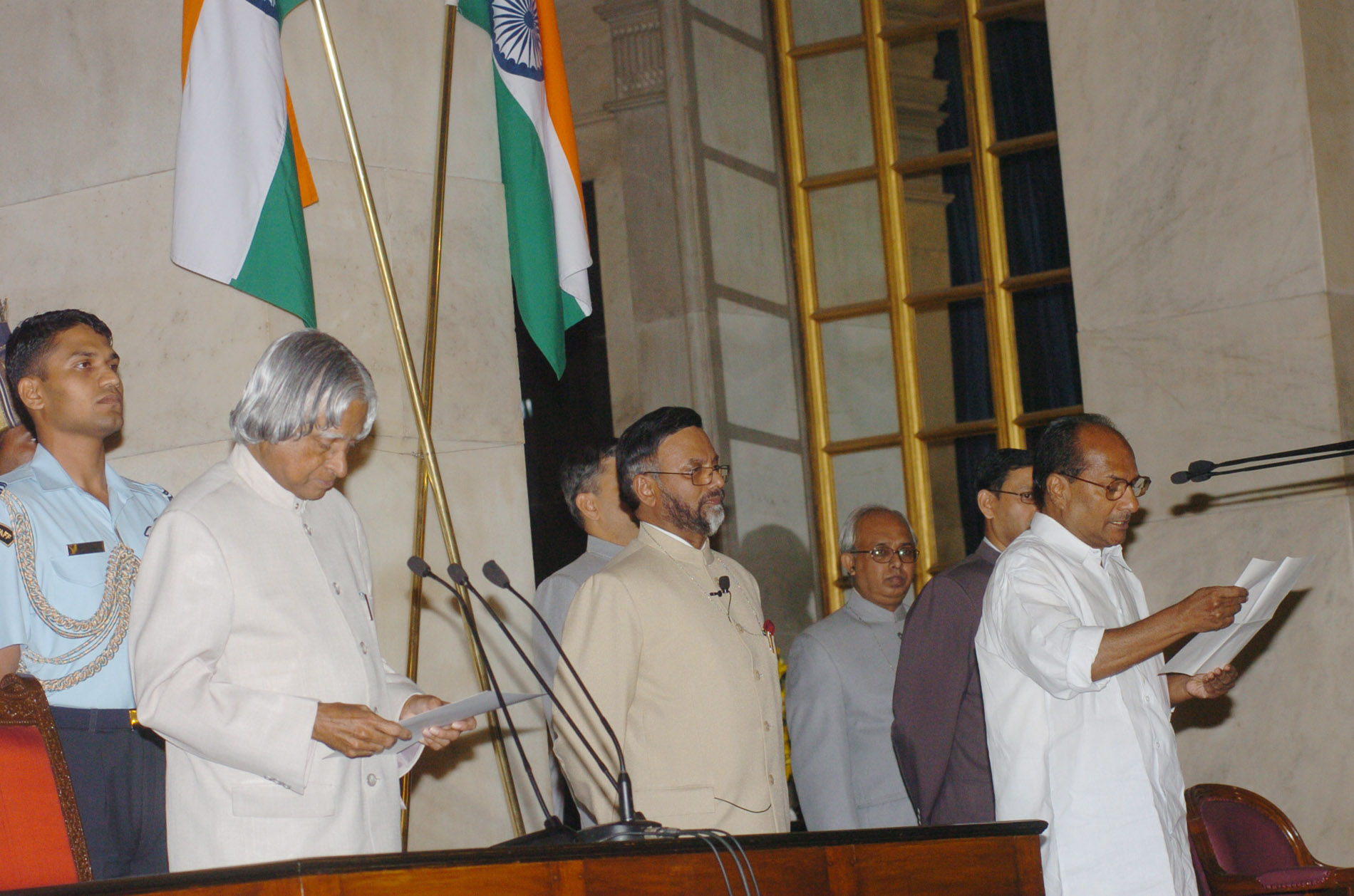
President of India A. P. J. Abdul Kalam administering the oath to Antony at a swearing-in Ceremony at Rashtrapati Bhawan in 2006.

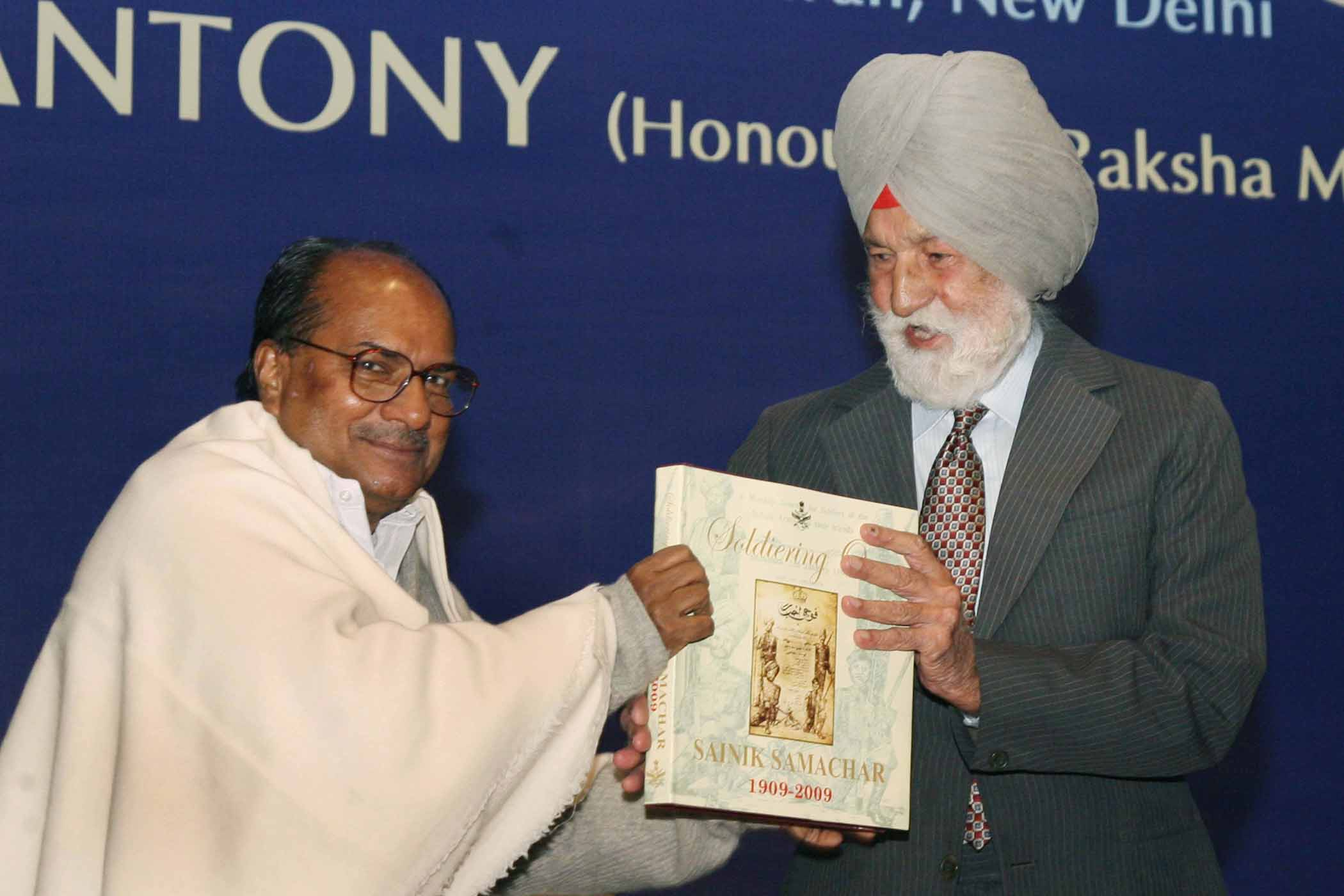
AK Antony presenting a copy of 'Sainik Samachar' to Marshal of the Indian Air Force Arjan Singh to mark the centenary celebrations of the Armed Forces' journal 'Sainik Samachar', in New Delhi in 2009

=== Union Minister for Civil Supplies ===
Antony was a Member of Parliament in the Rajya Sabha between 1993 and 1995 and was the Minister for Civil Supplies, Consumer Affairs and Public Distribution for a year in 1994 during the tenure of Prime Minister P. V. Narasimha Rao. He resigned on moral grounds as food minister in 1994 when his ministry was involved in a sugar import scandal, despite there being no allegations against him.

=== Union Minister for Defence ===
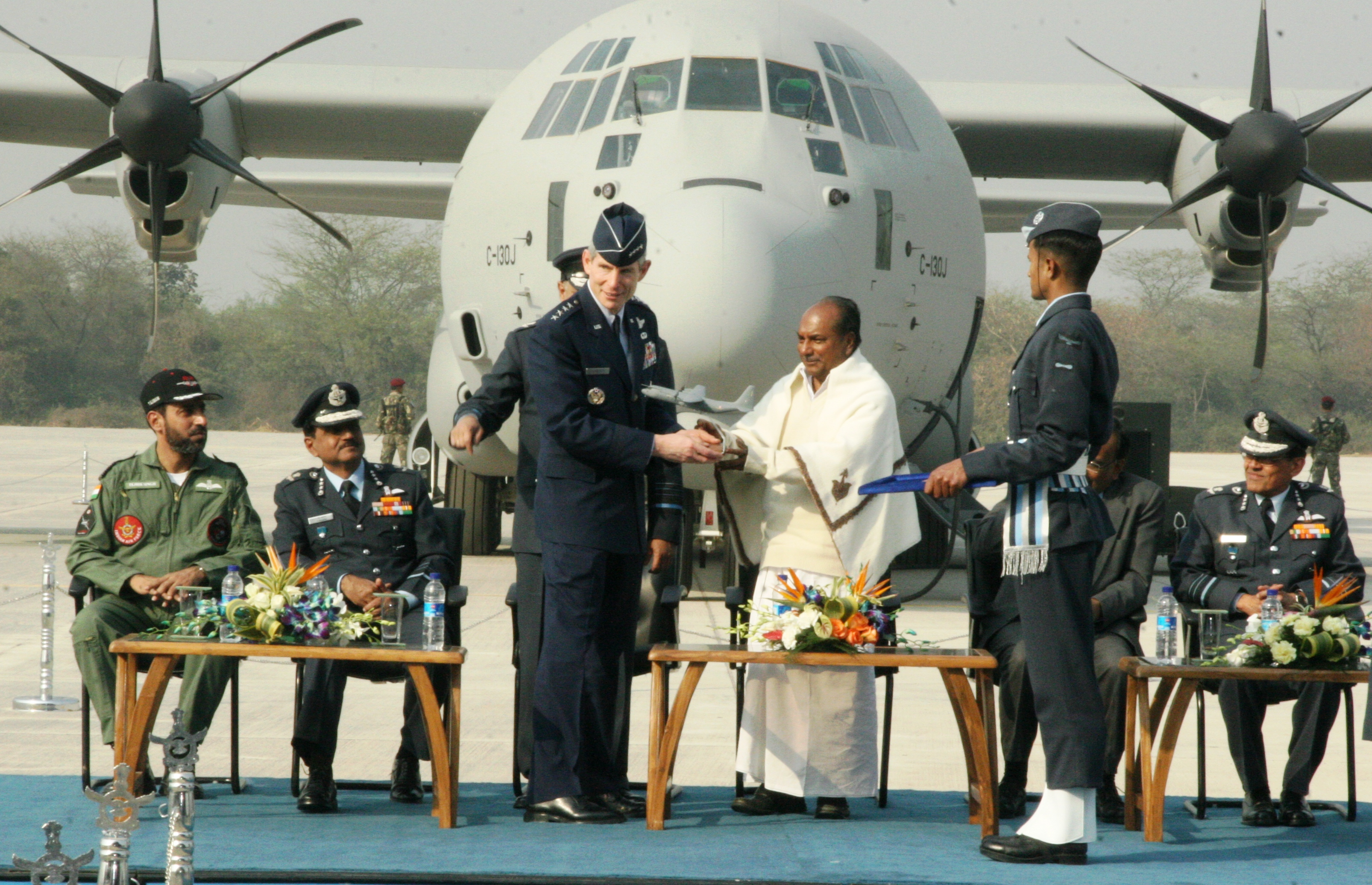
Defence Minister A. K. Antony with 19th Chief of Staff of the United States Air Force Norton Schwartz presenting a model of the C-130J Super Hercules in 2011

A. K. Antony with 23rd United States Secretary of Defense Leon Panetta in 2012

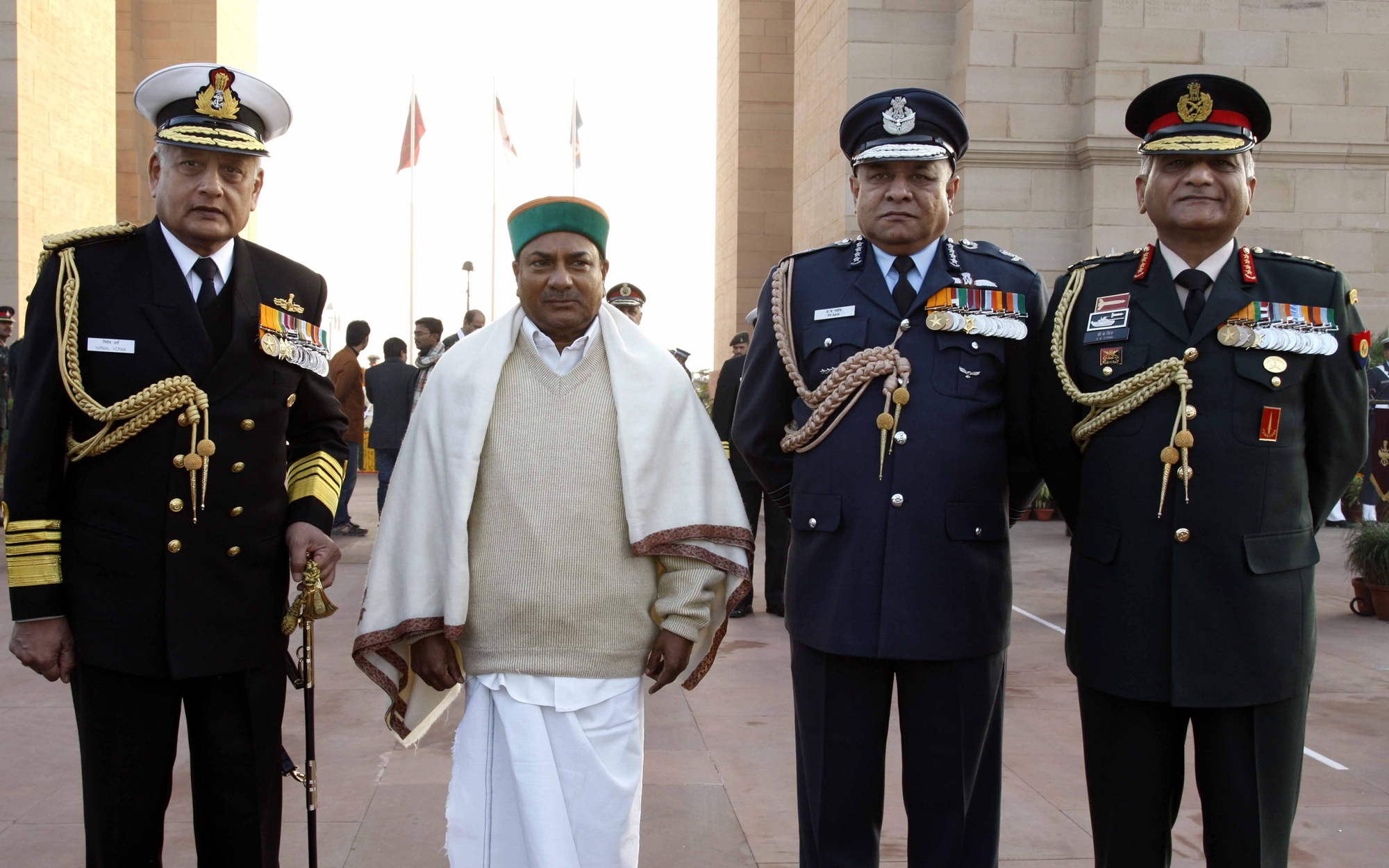
AK Antony with service Chiefs, General V.K. Singh, Admiral Nirmal Verma and Air Chief Marshal P. V. Naik at the Amar Jawan Jyoti to mark Vijay Diwas, 39th anniversary of the victory day of the 1971 India-Pakistan war in New Delhi in 2010

In 2005, Antony entered the Rajya Sabha and was inducted into the Union Council of Ministers as Defence Minister following Natwar Singh's expulsion from the Congress and Pranab Mukherjee's transfer to the Ministry of External Affairs. After the Congress again won the elections in 2009 and formed the government once again under Prime Minister Manmohan Singh, Antony retained the portfolio of Defence for the second term becoming the longest-serving Defence Minister of India in a continuous stint for 8 years. His "Buy and Make Indian" campaign saw the cancellation of billion of dollars in purchases of foreign arms, while at the same time stunting domestic production by restricting investments.

During his term, many domestic and international firms and companies were blacklisted for bribery and corruption - IMI Systems, ST Engineering Land Systems, Rheinmetall Air Defence and others. In 2010, Antony ordered a Central Bureau of Investigation probe into the Adarsh Housing Society scandal.

He oversaw the acquisition and final commissioning of INS Vikramaditya from Russia to Indian Navy.

=== Other positions ===
He held the post of Chairman of the Indian Statistical Institute in Kolkata (2012 to 2014), President of the Institute for Defence Studies and Analyses and Chancellor of Defence Institute of Advanced Technology (2006 to 2014).

=== Political party role ===
In the Manmohan Singh Cabinet, Antony was the senior member of the Cabinet Committees on Accommodation, Economic Affairs, Parliamentary Affairs, Political Affairs, and Security.

He is considered as political guru of Rahul Gandhi.

Antony's political skills and long experience in government have also led him to heading a large number of committees of Ministers in the government, a device that has been employed to obtain consensus within the members of the governing coalition on contentious issues.

GoM	EGoM
Location of National War Memorial	Spectrum Allocation
Reports of Administrative Reforms Commission	Gas Pricing and Commercial Utilisation
Corruption	Ultra Mega Power Projects
Recommendations with regard to Commonwealth Games	Mass Rapid Transit System

== Issues ==
=== Emergency ===
Antony highly critical speech at the AICC session in Guwahati, 1976 during the Emergency that played a pivotal role in Indira Gandhi’s change of mind—eventually leading her to lift the Emergency and call for elections.

Leaked diplomatic cables said Antony was one of the only two leaders, the other being P. R. Dasmunsi, who criticised Sanjay Gandhi during the 1976 AICC session in Guwahati during Emergency when the latter's political standing was on the rise, asking "what sacrifices he has made for the party or the country".

=== Civil Services reform ===
In order to professionalise the Civil Services, Antony led the decision on creation of a Central Civil Services Authority (CCSA) to oversee the higher bureaucracy.

=== Impeachment of Chief Justice of India ===
In 2018, Antony is one of the signatories to impeachment notice against Chief Justice of India Dipak Misra.

== Public image ==
Antony is known for his incorruptible record and simple personal life and his intolerance towards corruption in public life. He was ranked among the top 10 Most Powerful Indians for the year 2012 by The Indian Express.

10th Prime Minister of India Atal Bihari Vajpayee admired Antony for his simplicity, gentleness and his zeal for reforms and change as a way to ensure acceleration of Kerala's all-round development.

After Pranab Mukherjee was nominated for the 2012 President of India election, Antony was placed as the second-in-command after Prime Minister Manmohan Singh in the Cabinet of India.

== Election History ==
=== Rajya Sabha ===
Position	Party	Constituency	From	To	Tenure
Member of Parliament, Rajya Sabha (1st Term)	INC	Kerala	22 April 1985	21 April 1991	5 years, 364 days
Member of Parliament, Rajya Sabha (2nd Term)	INC	Kerala	22 April 1991	21 April 1997	4 years, 51 days (Resigned on 12 June 1995)
Member of Parliament, Rajya Sabha (3rd Term)	INC	Kerala	30 May 2005	2 April 2010	4 years, 307 days
Member of Parliament, Rajya Sabha (4th Term)	INC	Kerala	3 April 2010	2 April 2016	5 years, 365 days
Member of Parliament, Rajya Sabha (5th Term)	INC	Kerala	3 April 2016	2 April 2022	5 years, 364 days (Retirement)

== Personal life ==
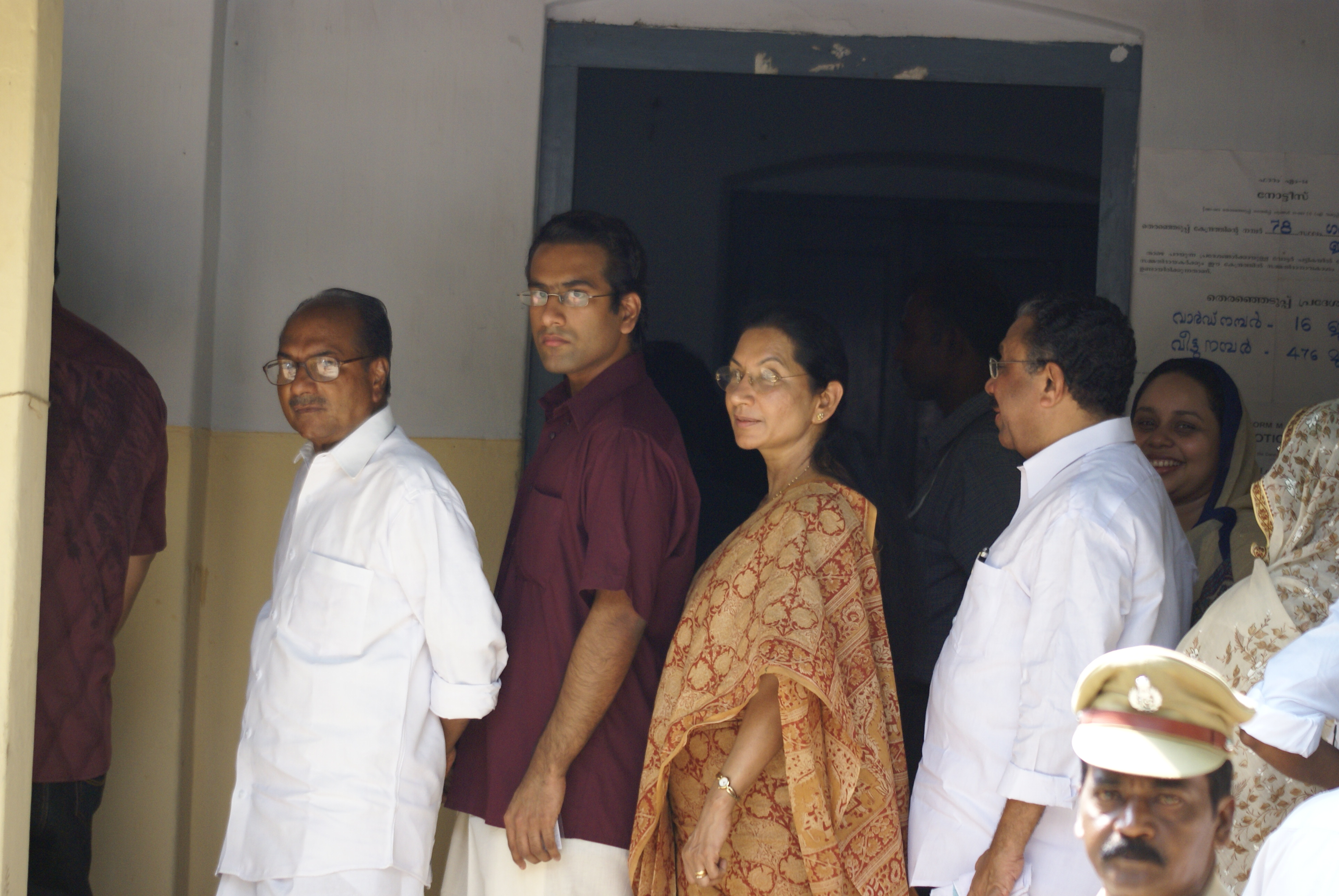
A. K. Antony with his family outside a polling station in Thiruvananthapuram, Kerala in 2009

Antony is married to Elizabeth who is a Kerala High Court lawyer and is the founder of the Navoothan Charitable Foundation. They have two sons. In April 2023, his son Anil Antony joined the Bharatiya Janata Party.Though he was born as a Syrian Catholic ,Antony identifies himself as an atheist.

== Honours ==
Year	Name	Awarding organisation	Ref.
2008	Malayali of the Year 2007 Award.	Asianet.	

== See also ==
- List of Rajya Sabha members from Kerala
- List of current members of the Rajya Sabha

Rajya Sabha
Preceded by N/A	Member of Parliament for Rajya Sabha (Kerala); 1985 to 1991	Succeeded by N/A
Preceded by N/A	Member of Parliament for Rajya Sabha (Kerala); 1991 to 1995	Succeeded by N/A
Preceded by N/A	Member of Parliament for Rajya Sabha (Kerala); 2005 to 2010	Succeeded by N/A
Preceded by N/A	Member of Parliament for Rajya Sabha (Kerala); 2010 to 2016	Succeeded by N/A
Preceded by N/A	Member of Parliament for Rajya Sabha (Kerala); April 2016 to Incumbent	Succeeded by N/A
Political offices
Preceded by K. Karunakaran	Chief Minister of Kerala; 1977–1978	Succeeded by P. K. Vasudevan Nair
Preceded by K. Karunakaran	Chief Minister of Kerala; 1995–1996	Succeeded by E. K. Nayanar
Preceded by E. K. Nayanar	Chief Minister of Kerala; 2001–2004	Succeeded by Oommen Chandy
Preceded by Ghulam Nabi Azad	Minister of Consumer Affairs, Food and Public Distribution; 1993-1995	Succeeded by Buta Singh
Preceded by Pranab Mukherjee	Minister of Defence; 2006–2014	Succeeded by Arun Jaitley
Party political offices
Preceded by Sitaram Kesri	Treasurer of All India Congress Committee; 1994–1995	Succeeded by Ahmed Patel
Preceded by	President of the Kerala Pradesh Congress Committee; 1973–1977, 1978–1982, and 1987–1992	Succeeded by
Educational offices
Preceded by Pranab Mukherjee	Chairman of Indian Statistical Institute; 2012 to 2014	Succeeded by Arun Shourie
