= Kuttikattu Sree Bhadra Kali Devi Temple =

Bhadra Kali Temple in Alappuzha district

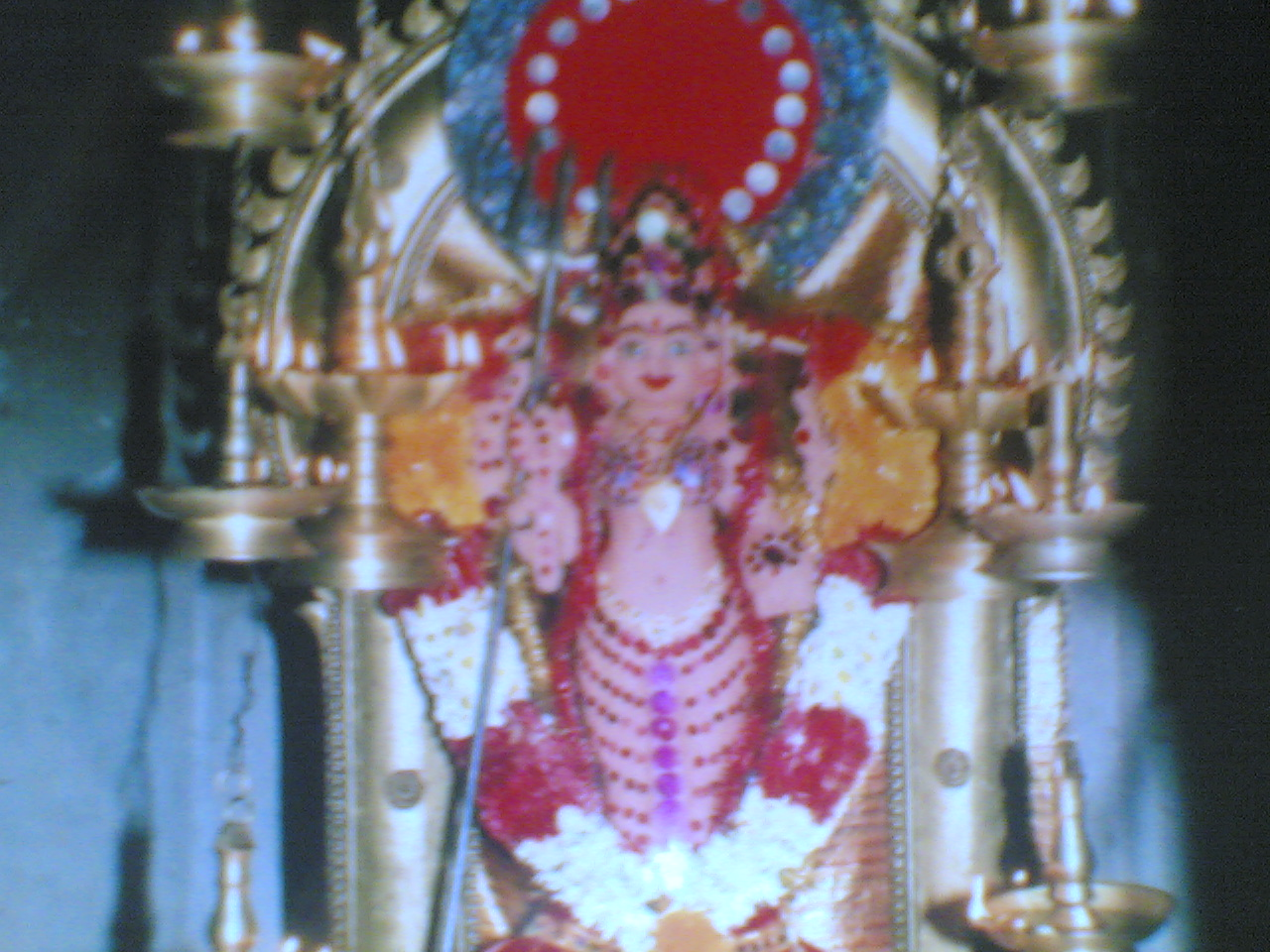

- Kuttikattu Sree Bhadrakali Devi Temple, Cherthala, Alappuzha, Kerala

Religion
- Affiliation: Hinduism
- District: Alappuzha
- Deity: Bhadrakali
- Festivals: Kunguma Khalasam, Serpant worship

Location
- Location: Cherthala
- State: Kerala
- Country: India
- Interactive map of Kuttikattu Sree Bhadra Kali Devi Temple
- Coordinates: 9°41′15.1″N 76°19′21.7″E

Architecture
- Type: Architecture of Kerala

Specifications
- Temple: One
- Elevation: 29 m (95 ft)

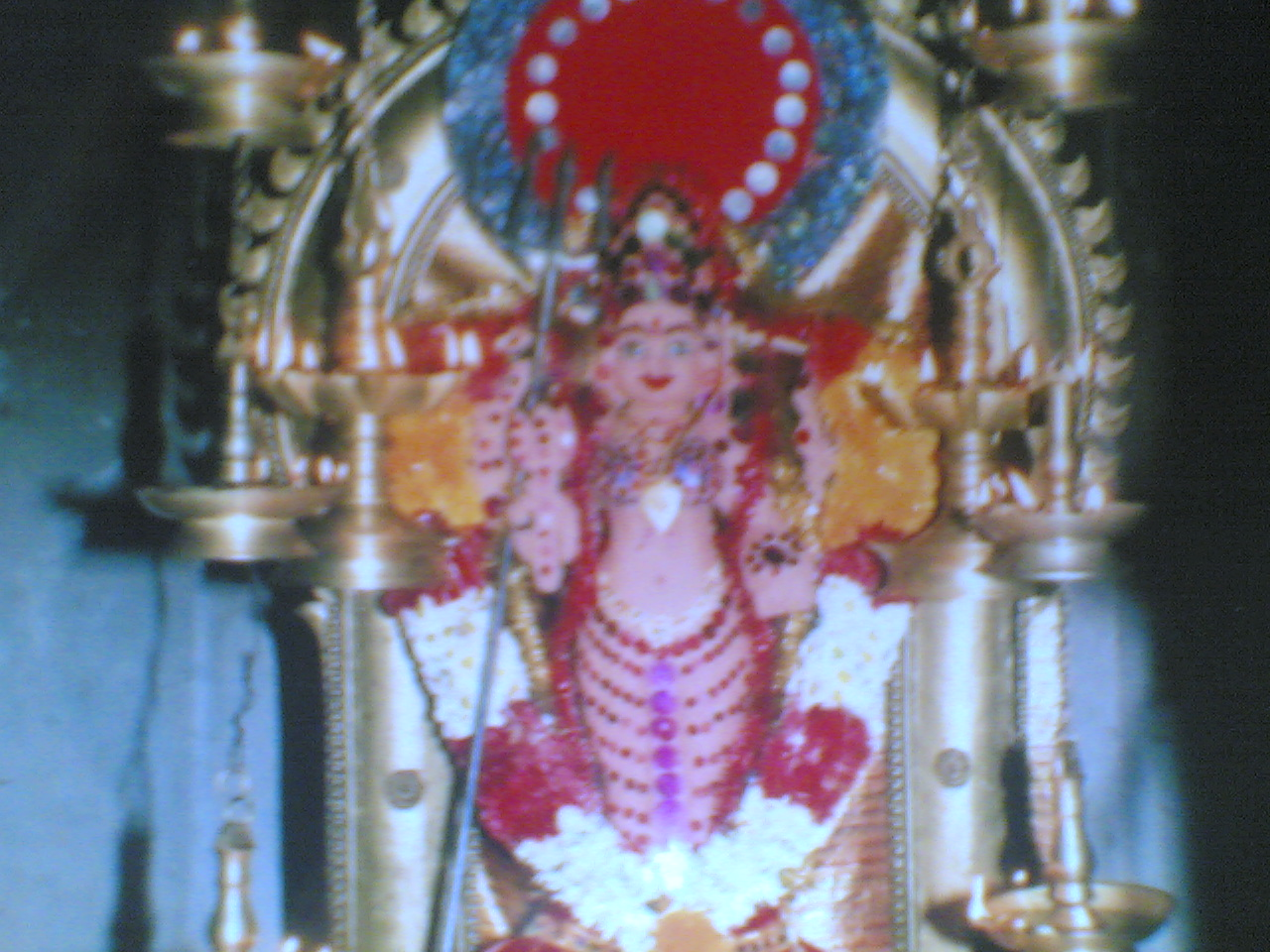
Devi saranam

Kuttikattu Sree Bhadra Kali Devi Temple is one of the Bhadrakali temples in Cherthala, Alappuzha district, Kerala. It is about 1 kilometer west of the Arthungal bypass of NH 47 at Cherthala.
