= Kanichukulangara Devi Temple =

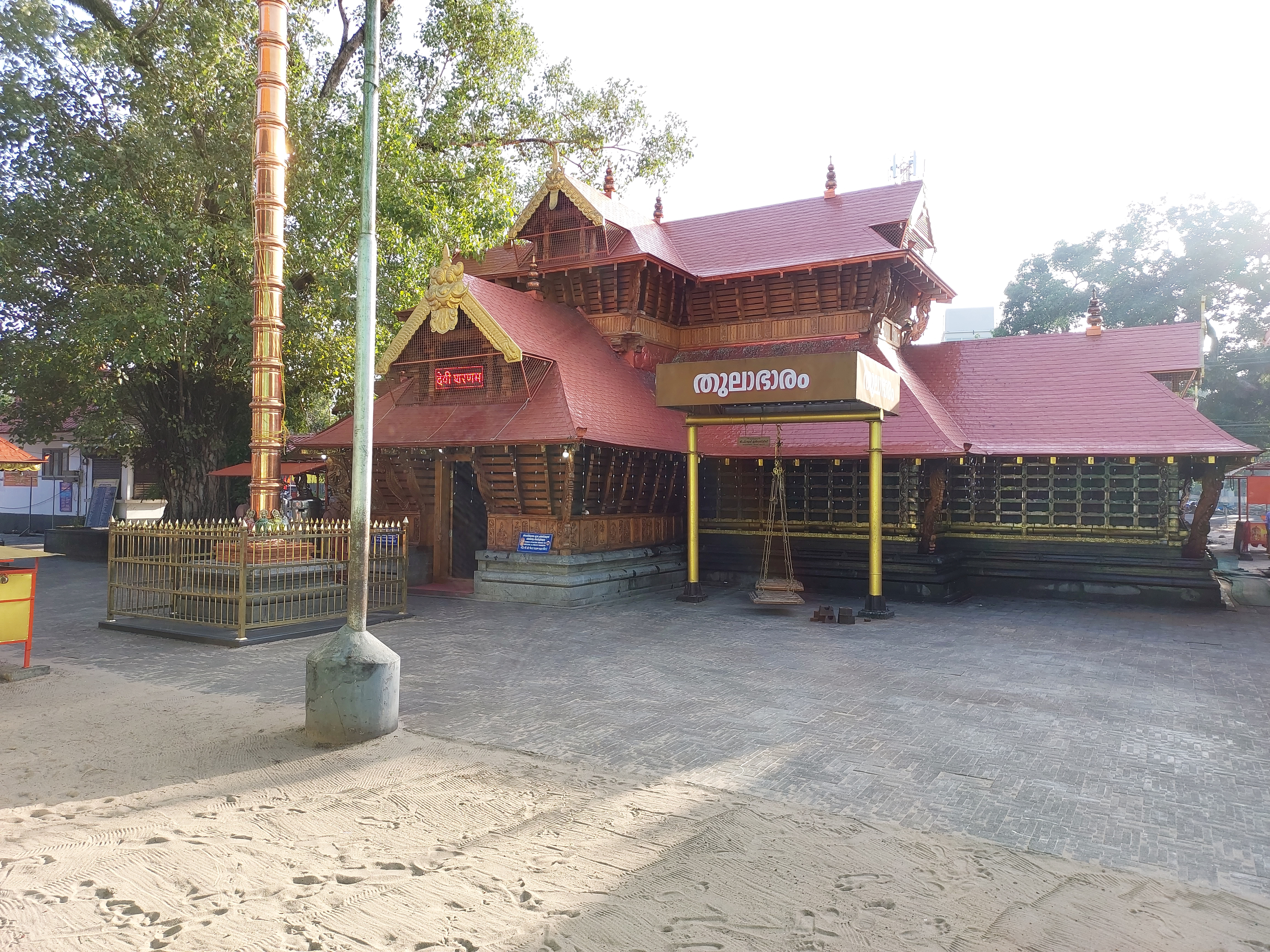

- Devi Temple, Kanichukulangara, Alappuzha, Kerala

Religion
- Affiliation: Hinduism
- District: Alappuzha
- Deity: Bhagavathy
- Festivals: Kumbham Thiruvonam, Pongala

Location
- Location: Kanichukulangara
- State: Kerala
- Country: India
- Coordinates: 9°37′45.2″N 76°18′49.1″E

Architecture
- Type: Architecture of Kerala

Specifications
- Temple: One
- Elevation: 26.44 m (87 ft)

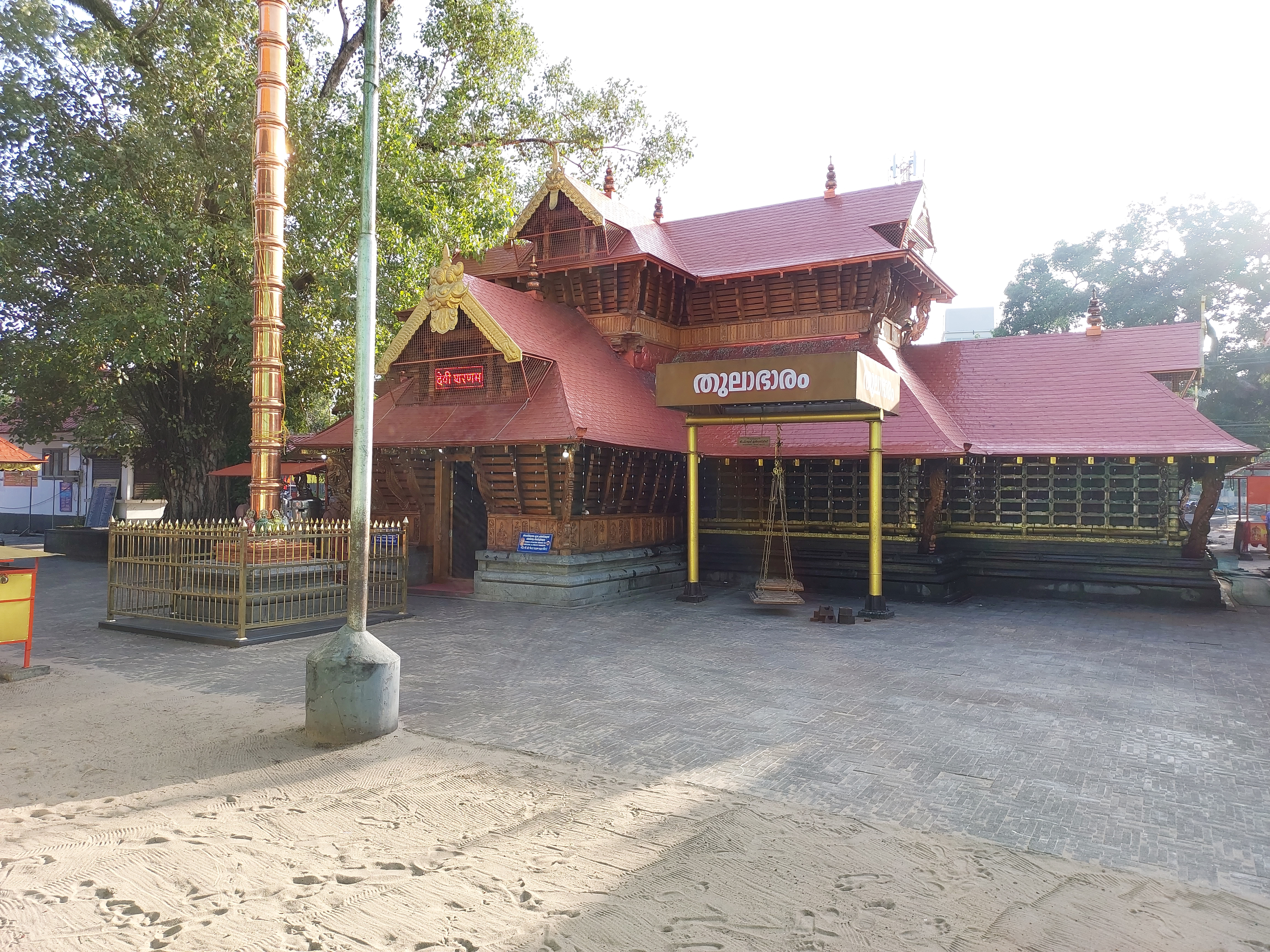
Kanichukulangara Devi Temple

Kanichukulangara Temple (also called Kanichukulangara Bhagwathy Temple) is a temple of the Hindu mother goddess Bhagawathi near Cherthala in the Alappuzha district of Kerala in India.

== Gallery ==
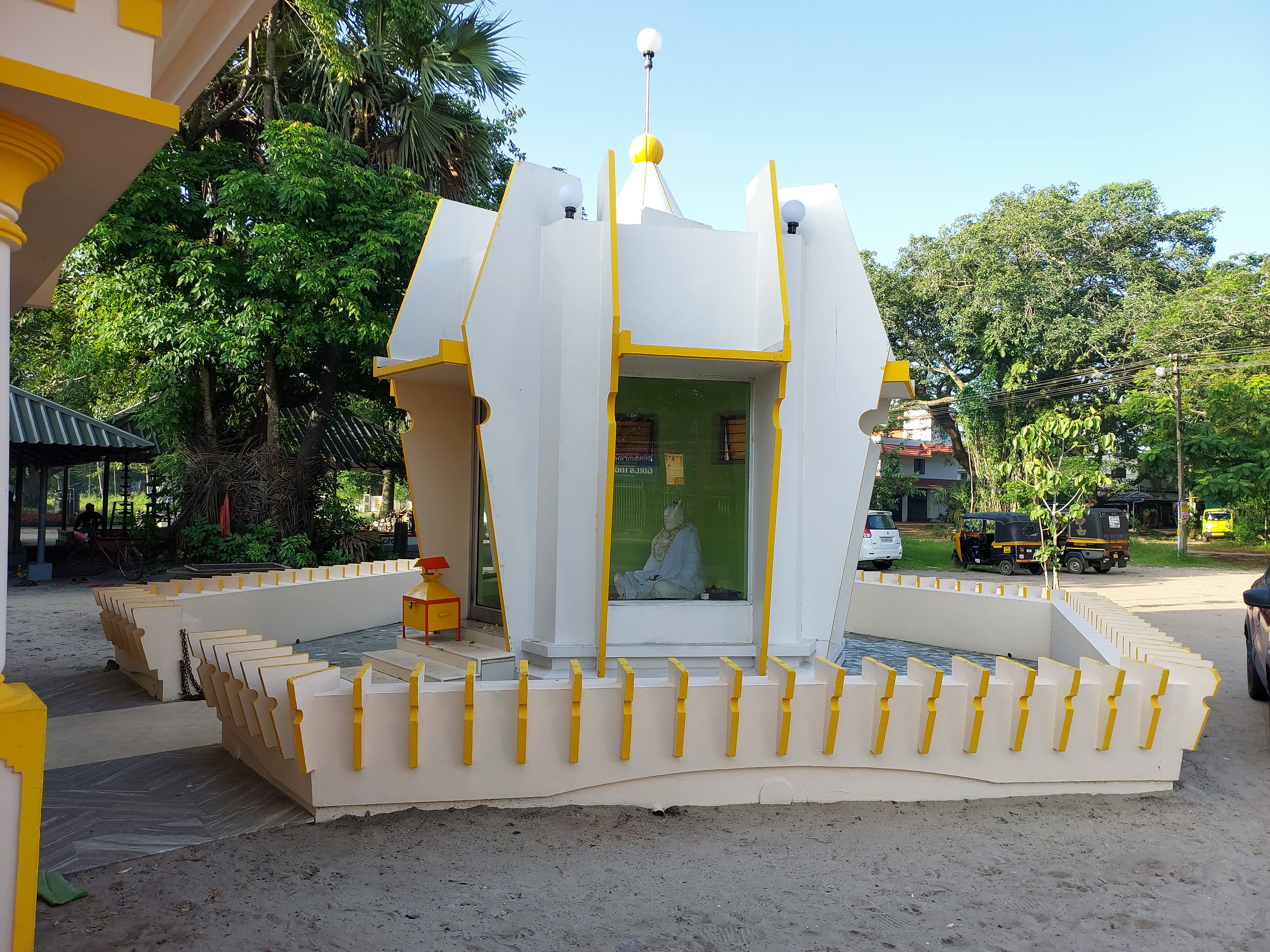
Gurumandiram

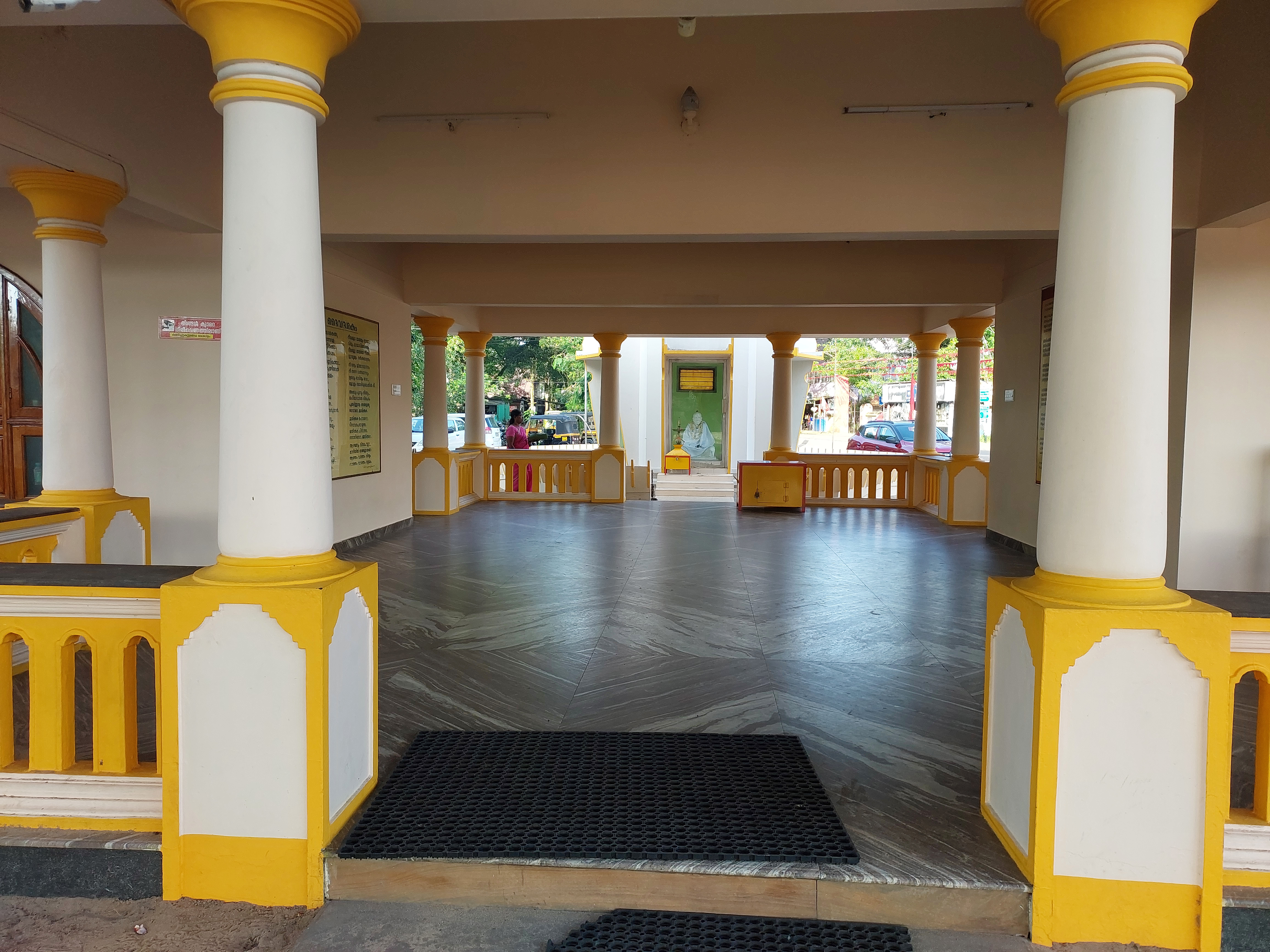
Gurumandiram - front view

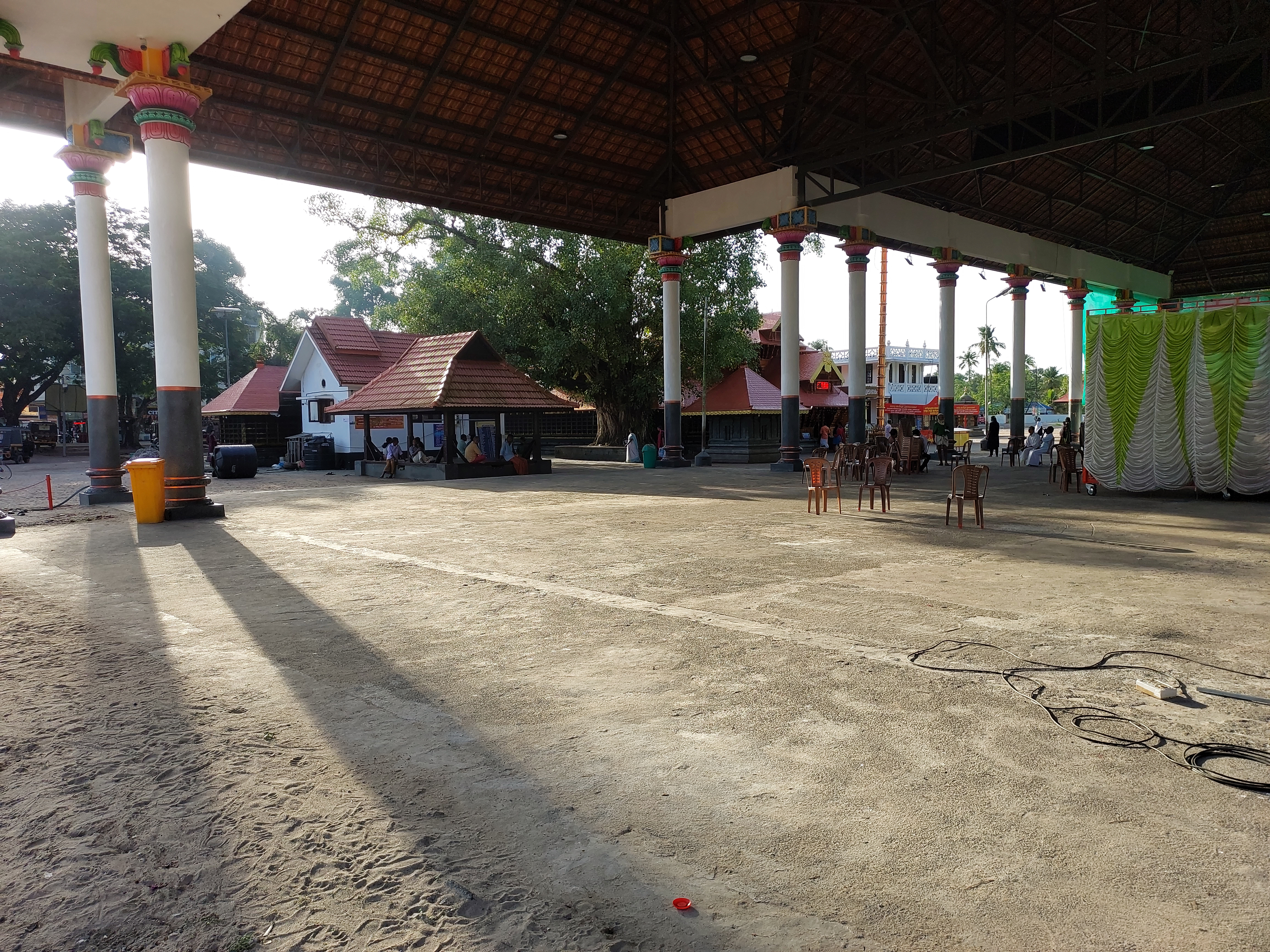
the temple
