= Mercy Ravi =

Indian politician (1945–2009)

Personal details
- Born: 18 March 1945 Ernakulam district, Kerala, India
- Died: 5 September 2009 (aged 64) Chennai, Tamil Nadu
- Party: Indian National Congress
- Spouse: Vayalar Ravi
- Children: 1 son; 2 daughters

Mercy Ravi (18 March 1945 – 5 September 2009) was a member of Kerala Legislative Assembly and the wife of the Indian politician Vayalar Ravi. She was also a renowned social worker and author.

== Early life and education ==
She was born in 1945 in Ernakulam district of Kerala to an elite Christian family. She was the daughter of Kuruvila Katticaren and Thandamma. She was educated at Maharaja's College, Ernakulam and was a post graduate. She married politician Vayalar Ravi, who was also her college senior, in 1969. Ravi later became the Overseas Indian Affairs Minister of India. The couple had one son, Ravi Krishna, and two daughters, Lisa Rohan and Lakshmi Ravi.

== Career ==
Mercy began her political career as a student activist. She held several key positions in the Congress party and was the General Secretary of the party in the Kerala Pradesh Mahila Congress and Kerala Pradesh Congress Committee. At the national level, she was elected as the President of the Indian National Trade Union Congress women's committee in 2000 and as member of All India Congress Committee. She was a representative of the Asia Pacific Region International Confederation of Trade Unions and a member of the Indian delegation to the World Women's Conference in Beijing.

== Death ==
At the end of her tenure in the Kerala assembly (2001–06) her health deteriorated and she underwent treatment for kidney problems. On 5 September 2009, at the age of 64, she died at the Madras Medical Mission Hospital, Chennai. She was laid to rest in Vayalar Ravi's ancestral home at Vayalar in Kerala's Alappuzha district.
