= Congress Core Committee =

Defunct group in INC

The Congress Core Committee (also known as Congress Core Group) was a group of top politicians in the Indian National Congress party. It was chaired by the Congress president, Sonia Gandhi.

== History ==
It was formed in 2004 to help the UPA government. The first committee consisted of Sonia Gandhi, Prime Minister Manmohan Singh, Pranab Mukherjee, A. K. Antony, Arjun Singh and P. Chidambaram. The committee met every week to take stock of the situation and decide on important issues. The committee was finally dissolved in June 2019.

== The members ==
In 2013, the committee had only 10 members

- Sonia Gandhi - President of the Indian National Congress
- Manmohan Singh - Former Prime Minister of India
- A. K. Antony Former Defence Minister of India
- P. Chidambaram
- Ahmed Patel
- Ghulam Nabi Azad
- Ashok Gehlot
- Randeep Surjewala
- Jairam Ramesh
- K. C. Venugopal
