= Kodamthuruth =

- village
- Location in Kerala, India Kodamthuruth (India)
- Coordinates: 9°47′0″N 76°18′0″E
- Country: India
- State: Kerala
- District: Alappuzha

Area
  - Total: 10.90 km^{2} (4.21 sq mi)

Population (2011)
  - Total: 21,295
  - Density: 1,954/km^{2} (5,060/sq mi)

Languages
  - Official: Malayalam, English
- Time zone: UTC+5:30 (IST)
- Postal code: 688533
- Lok Sabha constituency: Alappuzha
- Kerala Niyamasabha constituency: Aroor

Kodamthuruth is a village in Alappuzha district in the Indian state of Kerala. It is a panchayat, which comes under the Aroor Assembly constituency.

== Demographics ==
Kodamthuruth is a town in the Alappuzha district of Kerala. The population of Kodamthuruth town is 21,295. 10,365 of them are males and 10,930 are females according to 2011 Census of India.

The population of children aged from 0-6 is 1,828 that is 8.58% of the total population of Kodamthuruth. In the town, 1,055 is the female sex ratio against the Kerala state average of 1,084. The child sex ratio in Kodamthuruth is almost 1,036 compared the state average of 964. The town's literacy rate is 94.44%, higher than the state average of 94.00%. In Kodamthuruth, male literacy is almost 97.25% and female literacy rate is 91.78%.

Kodamthuruth has administration over 5,130 houses, to which it supplies basic amenities like water and sewer coverage.

== Schools ==
- Kodamthuruthu LP school
- Kodamthuruthu VV Higher Secondary School
- Chammanadu ECEK Union School
- Government Upper Primary School Changaram
- St.Antony's Government Lower Primary School, Ezhupunna South
