= P. Prasad =

Indian politician

Former Minister for Agriculture, Government of Kerala
- In office 20 May 2021 – 23 May 2026
- Chief Minister: Pinarayi Vijayan
- Portfolios: List: Agriculture; Soil Survey & Soil Conservation; Kerala Agricultural University; Warehousing Corporation
- Preceded by: V. S. Sunil Kumar
- Succeeded by: T. Siddique

Member of the Kerala Legislative Assembly
- Incumbent
- Assumed office 24 May 2021
- Preceded by: P. Thilothaman
- Constituency: Cherthala

Personal details
- Born: 1969 (age 56–57) Kerala, India
- Party: Communist Party of India
- Parent(s): G. Parameswaran Nair; Gomati Amma
- Education: NSS College, Pandalam

Parameswaran Nair Prasad is an Indian politician, social worker and environmentalist from Kerala. He formerly served as the Minister for Agriculture, Government of Kerala; representing Cherthala constituency in 15th & 16th Kerala Legislative Assembly. He is an executive committee member of the Communist Party of India.

== Personal life ==
P. Prasad was born in 1969 as the son of G Parameswaran Nair and Gomatiamma at Palamel, Nooranad, Alappuzha district. His father Parameswaran Nair was an AITUC leader and a member of the CPI Alappuzha District Council. He completed BSc Mathematics from Pandalam NSS College in 1989. He is married to Lyni and has two children, Bhagat and Aruna Almitra.

== Political career ==
P. Prasad started his public career through the All India Students Federation. While studying at Nooranad CBM High School, he became the AISF Taluk President. He also served as the AISF Unit Secretary of N. S. S. College, Pandalam. He has also served as AISF State President, AIYF State Executive Member, CPI Pathanamthitta district Secretary, All India Adivasi Mahasabha National Executive Member and University of Kerala Senate Member.

Prasad was the Additional Private Secretary of Forest Minister Binoy Viswam in 2011, he also acted as Janayugom Thiruvananthapuram Unit Manager. He was able to lead many environment related protests such as the agitation against the Aranmula International Airport project in Pathanamthitta. He also played a leading role in the Plachimada Coca-Cola struggle. He was able to give a new face to the anti-sand mining movement in the coastal areas of Arattupuzha and Thrikkunnapuzha in Alappuzha district with the participation of environmental activists. He also took part in the environmental protection struggles of Medha Patkar and Vandana Shiva and was an active volunteer in Narmada Bachao Andolan. He also serves as the Convener of the CPI State Environmental Sub-Committee and in that capacity he has taken strong stand against environmental concerns caused by encroachers at Kurinjimala Sanctuary, Munnar etc. He has visited Russia, Cuba, Nepal and South Africa as part of his political activities.

He was the chairman of Kerala State Housing Board from 26 December 2016 to 9 March 2021.

== Elections ==
In the 2016 Kerala Legislative Assembly election P. Prasad contested his first elections to the State legislative assembly from the Haripad (State Assembly constituency) and lost by a margin of 18,621 against the Leader of the Opposition, Ramesh Chennithala.

In the 2021 Kerala Legislative Assembly election P. Prasad contested from the Cherthala (State Assembly constituency) as a Left Democratic Front candidate. He won the election by defeating Adv. S. Sarath from Indian National Congress by a margin of 6148 votes.

In the 2026 Kerala Legislative Assembly election P. Prasad contested from the Cherthala (State Assembly constituency) as a Left Democratic Front candidate. He won the election by defeating Adv KR RAJENDRAPRASAD (former coirboard chairman in ommenchandy ministry ) from Indian National Congress by a margin of 18,000+ votes.[18]

== See also ==
- P. Thilothaman
- Aranmula International Airport
