= Poochakkal =

Poochakkal Town പൂച്ചാക്കൽ പട്ടണം
- Town
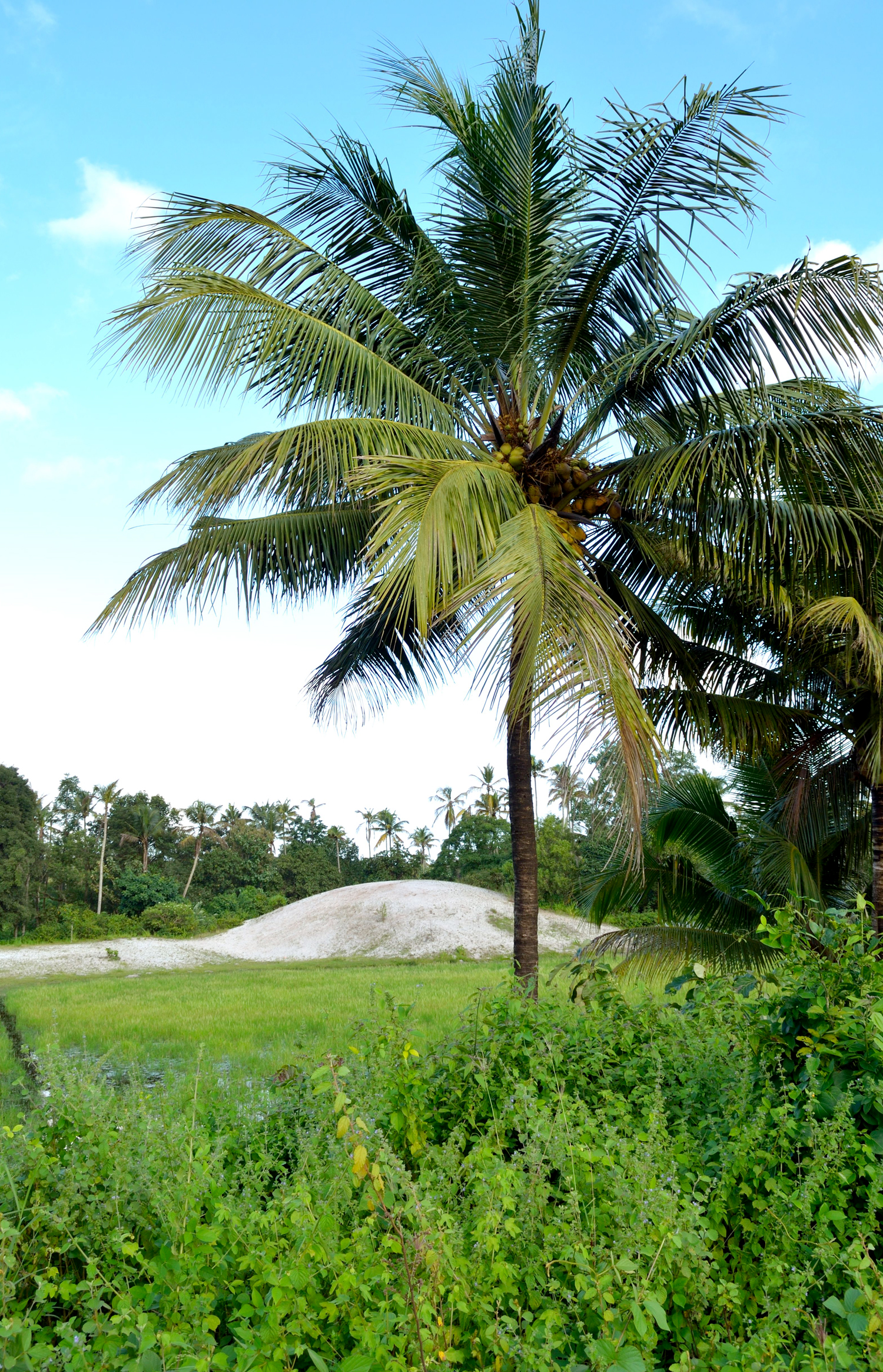
- View of Panchara Manal and Temple below

- Location in Kerala, India Poochakkal Town (India)
- Coordinates: 9.7951595°N 76.3545084°E
- Country: India
- State: Kerala
- District: Alappuzha

Government
  - Body: Town area Spread across Two Panchayats Panavally and Thycattuserry

Languages
  - Official: Malayalam, English
- Time zone: UTC+5:30 (IST)
- PIN: 688526
- Telephone code: 0478
- Vehicle registration: KL-32
- Nearest city: Ernakulam
- Lok Sabha constituency: Alappuzha
- Vidhan Sabha constituency: Aroor
- Civic agency: Spread in Two Panchayats Panavally and Thycattuserry

Poochakkal is part of a small island consisting Arookutty, Panavally, Thycattusserry and Pallippuram Panchayaths close to the Kerala Backwaters in Kerala, India. Until the 2006 Kerala Assembly election, Poochakkal was part of the Cherthala LAC. After delimitation from the 2011 elections, it became a part of Aroor LAC.

== Location ==
Poochakkal is located about 4 miles (7.4 km) from Vaduthala (Arookutty), 8 miles (14 km) from Cherthala, about 5 miles (8 km) from Vaikom, 12 miles (20 km) from Vytilla Hub and 15 miles (25 km) from Ernakulam.

== Economy ==
The economy was based on a water transportation system. Its water canal connects the eastern and western parts of Vembanadu Lake. Now it is directly connected to NH47 at two places by new road bridges at Aroor and Thuravoor. Also new bridge is under construction connecting to Vaikom.

== Notable people ==
- Saiju Kurup, Indian actor
