= Cherthala South =

- village
- Location in Kerala, India Cherthala South (India)
- Coordinates: 9.652172°N 76.317896°E
- Country: India
- State: Kerala
- District: Alappuzha

Population (2011)
  - Total: 26,157

Languages
  - Official: Malayalam, English
- Time zone: UTC+5:30 (IST)

Cherthala South is a village in Alappuzha district in the Indian state of Kerala.

== Demographics ==
As of 2011 India census, Cherthala South had a population of 26157 with 12923 males and 13234 females. Areepparambu is the headquarters of this village. The Thiruvizha Mahadevar Temple situated in Southern boarder of Cherthala South village. Thiruvizha Railway station is also located near this temple.
