= Vayalar Ravi =

Indian politician (born 1937)

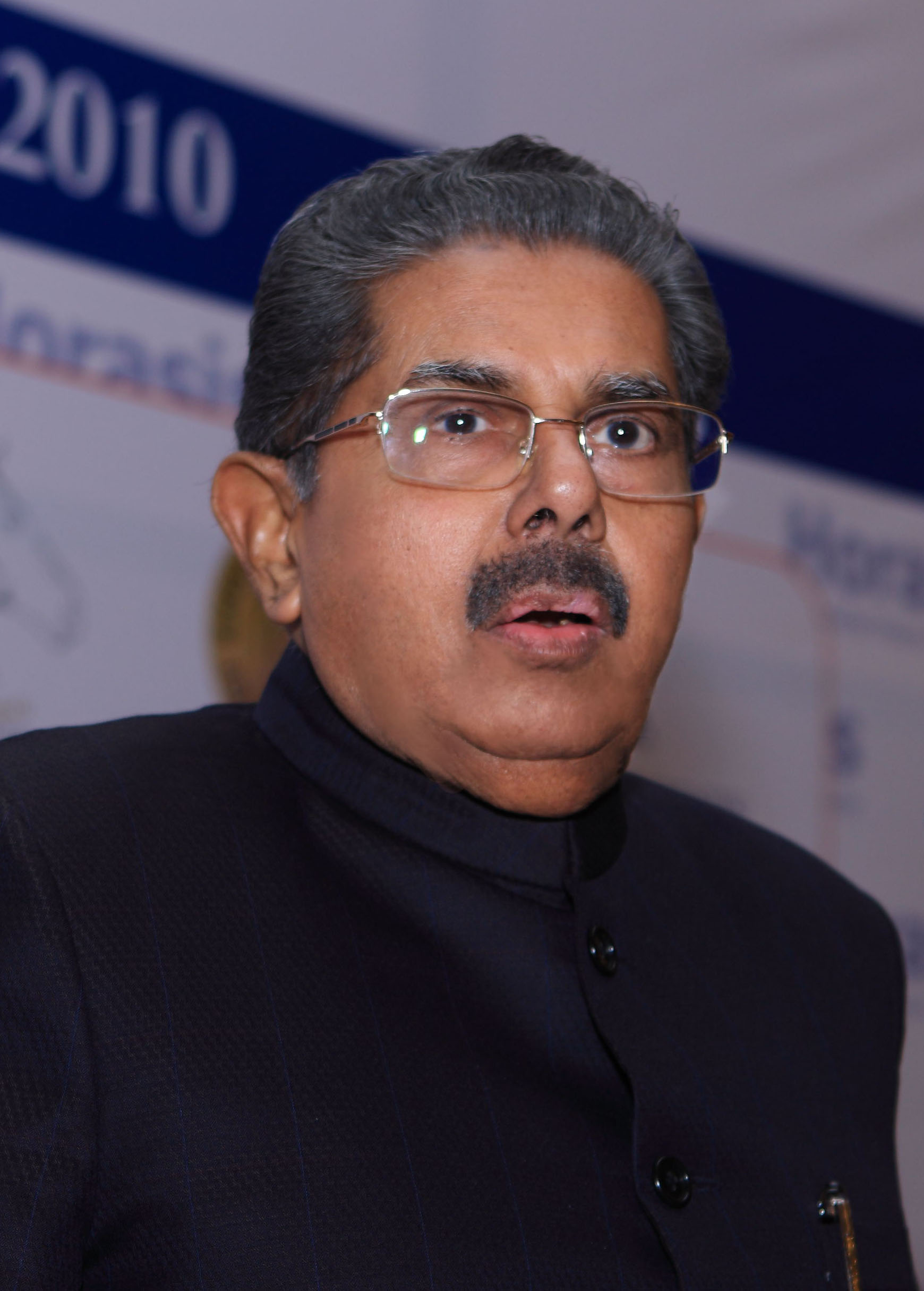

Member of Rajya Sabha for Kerala
- In office 22 April 2003 – 23 April 2021
- Constituency: Kerala
- In office 2 July 1994 – 1 July 2000
- Constituency: Kerala

Minister of Overseas Indian Affairs
- In office 29 January 2006 – 26 May 2014
- Prime Minister: Manmohan Singh
- Preceded by: Oscar Fernandes
- Succeeded by: Sushma Swaraj

Minister of Science and Technology Minister of Earth Sciences Minister of Micro, Small and Medium Enterprises
- In office 14 August 2012 – 28 October 2012
- Prime Minister: Manmohan Singh
- Preceded by: Vilasrao Deshmukh
- Succeeded by: Jaipal Reddy

Minister of Civil Aviation
- In office 19 January 2011 – 18 December 2011
- Prime Minister: Manmohan Singh
- Preceded by: Praful Patel
- Succeeded by: Chaudhary Ajit Singh

Minister of Home Affairs, Kerala
- In office 24 May 1982 – 24 May 1986
- Chief Minister: K. Karunakaran
- Preceded by: Oommen Chandy
- Succeeded by: K. Karunakaran

Member of Parliament, Lok Sabha
- In office 1971–1980
- Preceded by: K. Anirudhan
- Succeeded by: A. A. Rahim
- Constituency: Chirayinkil

Member of the Kerala Legislative Assembly
- In office 1982–1991
- Constituency: Cherthala

Personal details
- Born: 4 June 1937 (age 89) Alappuzha, Travancore
- Party: Indian National Congress
- Spouse: Mercy Ravi

Vayalar Ravi (born 4 June 1937) is an Indian politician, who served as the Union Minister of Overseas Indian Affairs from 2006 to 2014. He is a former member of the Rajya Sabha.

== Political life ==
Ravi was born in Vayalar, Cherthala, in the present-day Alappuzha District of Kerala. He was the first General Secretary of the Kerala Students Union (KSU), the students' wing of Indian National Congress in Kerala. Ravi was elected to the 5th Lok Sabha in 1971 from Chirayinkil in Thiruvananthapuram district; he was re-elected to the 6th Lok Sabha in 1977, serving until 1979. He was elected to the Kerala Legislative Assembly in 1982, and he served as Home Minister of Kerala from 1982 to 1986 before resigning from that position due to a disagreement with Chief Minister K. Karunakaran. He was re-elected to the Kerala Legislative Assembly in 1987, serving until 1991. He was elected to the Rajya Sabha in July 1994 and again in April 2003. He became Union Cabinet Minister for Overseas Affairs on 30 January 2006.

After the Congress reelection in 2009, Ravi was re-inducted to the Cabinet for the second UPA government and retained the portfolio of Overseas Indian Affairs. He was given the additional responsibility of Ministry of Civil Aviation on 19 January 2011. He resigned from the office after Rashtriya Lok Dal leader Ajit Singh succeeded him.

== Personal life ==
Vayalar Ravi was born to a prominent Ezhava family, as son of M. K. Krishnan, a veteran freedom fighter and a social activist and Devaki Amma a congress party leader in Vayalar, Kerala.

Ravi met his wife Mercy, while they were both active in the Kerala Students Union and he married her after a brief courtship. Mercy Ravi died on 5 September 2009 following a kidney failure, aged 64.

In February 2010, Vayalar Ravi along with Indian Ambassador Shamma Jain were injured in a car accident in Monrovia, Liberia, while on an official visit to African countries.

== Election History ==
=== Rajya Sabha ===
Position	Party	Constituency	From	To	Tenure
Member of Parliament, Rajya Sabha (1st Term)	INC(I)	Kerala	2 July 1994	1 July 2000	5 years, 365 days
Member of Parliament, Rajya Sabha (2nd Term)	INC	Kerala	22 April 2003	21 April 2009	5 years, 364 days
Member of Parliament, Rajya Sabha (3rd Term)	INC	Kerala	22 April 2009	21 April 2015	5 years, 364 days
Member of Parliament, Rajya Sabha (4th Term)	INC	Kerala	22 April 2015	21 April 2021	5 years, 364 days

Lok Sabha
Preceded by K. Anirudhan	Member of Parliament for Attingal; 1971 – 1980	Succeeded by A. A. Rahim
Political offices
Preceded by Oscar Fernandes	Minister of Overseas Indian Affairs; 2006 - 2014	Succeeded by Sushma Swaraj
Preceded by Praful Patel; MoS, Independent Charge	Minister of Civil Aviation; 19 January 2011–18 December 2011	Succeeded by Ajit Singh
Preceded by Vilasrao Deshmukh	Minister of Micro, Small and Medium Enterprises; 14 August 2012–28 October 2012	Succeeded by K. H. Muniyappa; MoS, Independent Charge
Preceded by Vilasrao Deshmukh	Minister of Earth Sciences; 10 August 2012–28 October 2012	Succeeded by Jaipal Reddy
Preceded by Vilasrao Deshmukh	Minister of Science and Technology; 14 August 2012–28 October 2012	Succeeded by Jaipal Reddy
