= Cherthala =

- Municipality
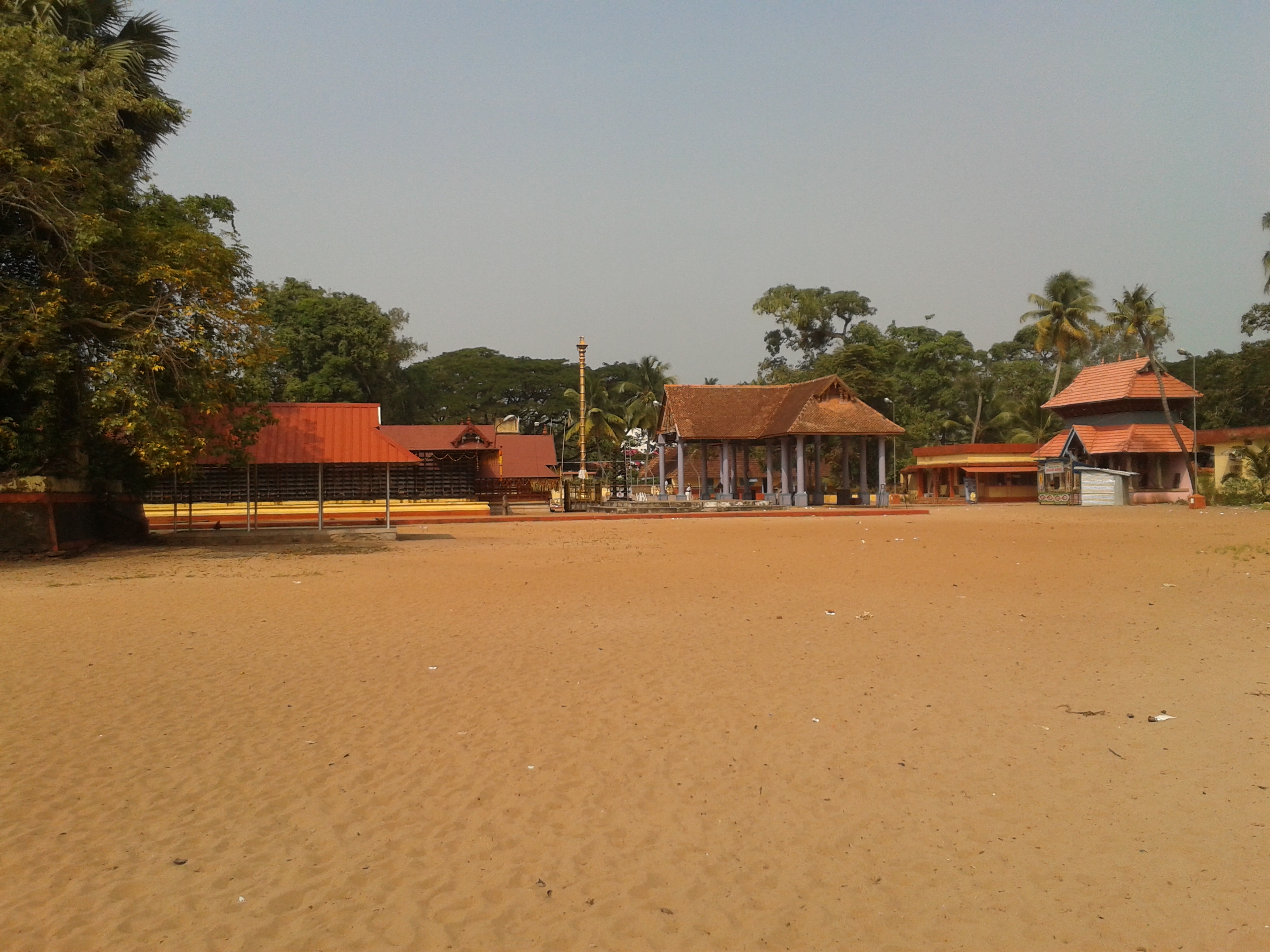
- Cherthala

- Location in Kerala, India Cherthala (India)
- Coordinates: 9°41′13″N 76°20′10″E
- Country: India
- State: Kerala
- District: Alappuzha

Government
  - MLA: P. Prasad

Area
  - Total: 16.18 km^{2} (6.25 sq mi)
- Elevation: 2 m (6.6 ft)

Population (2011)
  - Total: 45,827
  - Density: 2,832/km^{2} (7,336/sq mi)

Languages
  - Official: Malayalam, English
- Time zone: UTC+5:30 (IST)
- PIN: 688524
- Telephone code: 0478
- Vehicle registration: KL-32
- Sex ratio: 1030 ♂/♀
- Lok Sabha constituency: Alappuzha
- Vidhan Sabha constituency: Cherthala
- Nearest cities: Alappuzha (22 km), Kochi (40 km)

Cherthala is a municipality in the southern suburb of kochi situated within Alappuzha district of Kerala, India, located along the National Highway 66 of about 22 km (14 mi) north of the district headquarters Alappuzha and 40 km (25 mi) south of the commercial city Kochi.

As per the 2011 Indian census, Cherthala has a population of 45,821 people, and a population density of 2,727/km^{2} (7,060/sq mi).

== Etymology ==
According to local legend, Vilwamangalam Swamiyar, the Kerala Hindu saint, while travelling through Cherthala, found an idol of the Devi with its head immersed in a muddy pond. The Swami understood the divinity of the idol, took it out of the mud, cleaned it and consecrated it in a temple near the pond. Thus the place is believed to have gotten its name as cher meaning "mud" and thala meaning "head" in Malayalam. The deity of the temple has the name Cherthala Karthiyayani.

== History ==
During the medieval period Cherthala was an important hub for the spice trade, with merchants from across India and abroad trading spices, textiles, and other commodities. Its proximity to the backwaters and Arabian Sea made it ideal for such activities.

In the 18th century, following the 1762 treaty between Travancore and Cochin, Cherthala came under the Kingdom of Travancore and remained a vital trade center. The economy and culture flourished, with various institutions established. It served as a strategic center during conflicts such as the Travancore-Dutch War (1757–1758), when Dutch outposts in Alleppey were key targets. The region experienced political instability in the early 20th century, culminating in the Punnapra-Vayalar uprising of 1946, a communist-led revolt against Travancore rule that spread from Cherthala to Ambalapuzha.

After the States Reorganisation Act of 1956, Cherthala became part of Kerala. Today, it is a thriving municipality with a diverse economy and rich cultural heritage.

== Climate ==
Climate data for Cherthala, Kerala
Month	Jan	Feb	Mar	Apr	May	Jun	Jul	Aug	Sep	Oct	Nov	Dec	Year
Mean daily maximum °C (°F)	31.8 (89.2)	32.0 (89.6)	32.6 (90.7)	32.7 (90.9)	29.4 (84.9)	28.8 (83.8)	28.8 (83.8)	29.3 (84.7)	29.3 (84.7)	29.9 (85.8)	30.5 (86.9)	31.3 (88.3)	30.5 (86.9)
Mean daily minimum °C (°F)	22.4 (72.3)	23.4 (74.1)	24.8 (76.6)	25.5 (77.9)	25.1 (77.2)	23.8 (74.8)	23.2 (73.8)	23.5 (74.3)	23.6 (74.5)	23.7 (74.7)	23.7 (74.7)	22.7 (72.9)	23.8 (74.8)
Average precipitation mm (inches)	25 (1.0)	39 (1.5)	56 (2.2)	145 (5.7)	351 (13.8)	705 (27.8)	621 (24.4)	392 (15.4)	297 (11.7)	317 (12.5)	199 (7.8)	53 (2.1)	3,200 (125.9)
Source: Climate-Data.org

== Demographics ==
According to 2011 census report, Cherthala Municipality had population of 45,827 of which 22,192 are males while 23,635 are females.

The population of children aged 0–6 is 3988 which is 8.70% of total population of Cherthala (M). In Cherthala Municipality, the female sex ratio is 1065 against state average of 1084. Moreover, the child sex ratio in Cherthala is around 911 compared to Kerala state average of 964. The literacy rate of Cherthala city is 97.02% which is higher than the state average of 96.2%. In Cherthala, male literacy is around 98.58% while the female literacy rate is 95.59%.

== Educational organizations ==
=== Colleges ===
==== Engineering ====
- College of Engineering, Cherthala
- KVM College of Engineering & Information Technology
- Government Polytechnic College

==== General ====
- N.S.S. College, Cherthala
- St. Michael's College, Cherthala
- Sree Narayana College, Cherthala
- KVM College of Arts & Science

==== Management & Pharmacy ====
- Naipunnya School of Management
- St. Joseph's College of Pharmacy
- KVM College of Nursing

=== Schools ===
==== State Syllabus ====
- Govt Boys Higher Secondary School, Cherthala
- Holy Family Higher Secondary School, Muttom
- Holy Family High School, Muttom
- Holy Family LP Girls School, Muttom
- St. Marys Girls High Schol, Cherthala
- Government Vocational Higher Secondary School, Cherthala

==== CBSE Syllabus ====
- Bishop Moore Vidyapith
- Sree Sankara English Medium School
- K.E. Carmel Central School, Muhamma
- Rajagiri St.Chavara CMI School, Manappuram

==== ICSE Syllabus ====
- St. Ann's Public School
- St. Joseph Public School
- Little Flower School, Mathilakom

== Landmarks ==
Cherthala Town Municipality has 35 wards.

The town center is marked by the prominent Karthyayani Devi temple, and the historic St Marys Forane Church (Muttathu Palli) serves as a major spiritual landmark in the muttom area.

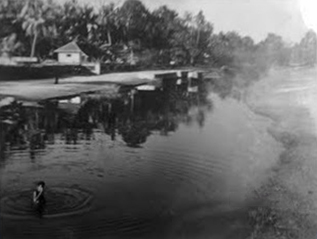
Cherthala Back waters at 1960s

== Notable people ==
=== Activism and religion ===
- Karunakara Guru – founder of Santhigiri Ashram
- P. Parameswaran – director, Bharatheeya Vichara Kendram
- Palackal Thoma Malpan – founder of the Carmelites of Mary Immaculate
- Mgr. Joseph C. Panjikaran – founder of the Medical Sisters of St. Joseph
- Fr.Basilius Panat C.S.T- Founder Little flower congregation

=== Arts and culture ===
- Irayimman Thampi – Carnatic musician as well as a music composer from Kerala
- Vayalar Ramavarma – Malayalam poet and film lyricist
- Jagannatha Varma – Kathakali artist, actor in Malayalam film and serial
- Thiruvizha Sivanandan – renowned Karnatic violinist and teacher
- Rajeev Alunkal – Film lyricist, poet, orator And chairman Kumaranasan Smarakam, Govt of Kerala

=== Business ===
- S. D. Shibulal – chief executive officer and managing director of Infosys
- PS Karthikeyan – former secretary, S.N. Trust, former director of SNDP Yogam, former member of the Legislative Assembly – Aroor, chief editor of Dinamani daily

=== Entertainment ===
- Vayalar Sarath Chandra Varma – film lyricist
- Rajan P. Dev – Malayalam film actor and drama/theater personality
- S. L. Puram Sadanandan – Malayalam playwright and film scriptwriter
- Chelangatt Gopalakrishnan – writer and film critic
- Joy J. Kaimaparamban – English and Malayalam author
- Jomon T. John – Indian cinematographer
- Sijoy Varghese – actor, ad film director
- Radhika – Malayalam cine actress
- Syam Pushkaran – Malayalam scriptwriter
- Prakash Varma – Actor, ad filmmaker

=== Politics ===
- A. K. Antony – thrice chief minister of Kerala in UDF Ministry, Indian Defence Minister
- Vayalar Ravi – former home minister of Kerala in UDF Ministry, Union Cabinet Minister of Overseas Indian Affairs and Minister for Parliamentary Affairs
- K. R. Gouri Amma – first revenue minister of Kerala State, first woman minister of Kerala state.
- P. J. Thomas, Polayil – chief secretary, Kerala
- C. K. Chandrappan – communist leader
- P. Thilothaman – former minister for food and civil supplies, Kerala State
- A. D. Thomas, MLA of Alappuzha Legislative Constituency

=== Science and technology ===
- Itty Achuthan – major contributor of ethno-medical information for the compilation of Hortus Malabaricus
- Gopinath Kartha — crystallographer born in Cherthala
- S. Somanath – aerospace engineer and currently serving as chief of ISRO

== See also ==
- Places of worship in Cherthala
- Alappuzha district
