= Puthukkary =

Village in Alappuzha District, Kerala, India

Puthukkary is a small village in Kuttanadu Taluk. It is located in Ramankary Panchayat. It is 2 km far from Mampuzhakkary, at AC Road and, 5 km far from Edathua at Thiruvalla-Ambalappuzha Road. It is believed that this region (most part of Kuttanad) was a very big forest in ancient years but later destroyed by a forest fire. Still we can see "kari" (means coal) if we dig deep into the soil. So this place's name ended up with Kari. Mampuzhakkary-Edathua Road Passing through Puthukkary, 2 kilometers to Mampuzhakary and 5.5 kilometers to Edathua. Major Christian church is St Xaviers Church (Estd 1869 February 4), now under the Archdiocese of Changanassery. Nearby villages are Kalangara Mithrakary, Oorukkary, Thekke Puthukkary, Kalangara, Koduppunna, Mampuzhakary, Edathua etc. Most of the villagers here are farmers and mainly depend on Alappuzha and Changanacherry for their day-to-day life.

St.Xavier's Church in Puthukkary is one of the old churches in Kuttanadu Taluk. It established in 1869, as a Chapel of St Mary's Church Champakkulam. Puthukkary Church hails to Edathua Forane and The Archeparchial Diocese of Changanacherry. Puthukkary Church has a Chapel in South Puthukkary, in the name of St Joseph. A Temple is also there in South Puthukkary, The Koyipurathu Kavu Temple, for the Hindu devotees.

The puthukary service co-operative bank started on 1939. Famous film personality hailing from Puthukary is filmmaker Vinayan. Most of the area is covered with water throughout the year. Kuttanadu is one of the few places in the world where farming is carried out below sea level.

Puthukary in Kuttanad, Kerala, India
