= Thottappally Spillway =

Water release structure in India

Coordinates: 9.3174°N 76.3864°E

Thottappally Spillway is Kuttanad's drain-way out to the Arabian Sea. The spillway splits Thottappally Lake with the fresh water part to the east and saline Thottappally river mouth to the west merging with the Arabian Sea. The spillway was constructed to spill excess water coming over the Upper Kuttanad and Lower Kuttanad regions through Manimala River, Achancovil River and Pamba River.

It was designed to spill off 19,500 cubic meters of water per second, but after its construction it was found that it can only spill 600 cubic meters of water per second. The reasons for this reduced flow rate are strong sea breezes during rainy seasons resulting in a rise in sea level relative to the water level of Kuttanad, formation of sand bars on the western area of the spillway, and the width of the leading canal is too narrow to carry this much water to the spillway.
