= Neerattupuram =

Neerattupuram Chakkulathukavu
- village
- Location in Kerala, India Neerattupuram (India)
- Coordinates: 9°22′10″N 76°31′0″E
- Country: India
- State: Kerala
- District: Alappuzha

Government
  - Body: Thalavady Grama Panchayat

Languages
  - Official: Malayalam, English
- Time zone: UTC+5:30 (IST)
- PIN: 689571
- Telephone code: 91 477 221 ----
- Vehicle registration: KL-
- Nearest city: Thiruvalla
- Lok Sabha constituency: Mavelikkara
- Civic agency: Thalavady Grama Panchayat
- Climate: Jan Feb- pleasant, Mar, April, May-Hot (temperature goes up to 38 C) June, July, August- heavy rains, Sept, Oct, Nov-Moderate rain Dec-dry (Köppen)
- Website: www.freezonal.com/neerattupuram/

Neerattupuram is a place in Kuttanad, Alappuzha district, Kerala, India. It is a part of Thalavady Grama Panchayat, situated near the junction of Alappuzha, Pathanamthitta and Kottayam districts, at the confluence of Pamba and Manimala rivers.

== Location ==
Neerattupuram is located at Thalavady Village of Kuttanad Taluk in Alappuzha district, Kerala (India). Neerattupuram is just 10 km away from Thiruvalla Railway Station and 28 km away from Alappuzha Railway Station. It’s exactly situated at the border of Alappuzha and Pathanamthitta districts. A medium-sized bridge in Neerattupuram divides Alappuzha and Pathanamthitta districts. A significant portion of the land is located on the bank of the joint ventures of Pampa and Manimala rivers. Many tourists are coming here through this river from Kumarakom, Alappuzha, Pathanamthitta, etc.

== Temples ==
Chakkulathukavu Temple is well known for the Pongala, a typical Hindu festival, which takes place every year during the month of November. The main festival of this temple is during the last two weeks of December (Malayalam calendar, Dhanu 1-12). Neerattupuram is also called Neerattupuram.

https://www.keralatourism.org/event/pamba-boatrace/97

== Boat race ==
Every year, the River Pamba plays host to the Uthradam Thirunal Pamba Boat Race.

Held during Uthradam, one of the most auspicious days of Onam (the harvest festival of Kerala), the boat race enjoys a wide participation with locals and tourists thronging the banks of the river and egging on the rowers with much fervor.

This grand water regatta unleashes such a visual splendor that travelers arrive in large numbers from far and wide to watch this glorious spectacle. The serene waters of the River Pamba at Neerattupuram in Alappuzha is transformed into a race track as majestic snake boats slice through the waters to the rhythmic notes of the boat songs.

The water sport witnesses a participation of more than 100 oarsmen in snake boats. The oarsmen chant the vanchipaattu (boat songs) and beat their oars on the waters in unison to propel their boats to the finishing point. The rowers compete with all their vigor to bag the prestigious K.C. Mammen Mappillai Trophy.

== Churches ==
The area is surrounded by more than seven churches, such as Thalavady Padinjarekara Marthoma Church, India Pentecostal Church of God, Assemblies of God in India Church, St. Johns Marthoma Church, St Thomas Evangelical Church, Vengal St George Orthodox Church and St Thomas Orthodox Church. There is also a historical church Kuzhipally which is jointly run and maintained by the Thalavady Padinjarekara Marthoma Church and the Orthodox churches. Nearby hospitals are Manak hospital- Nedumpuram and the government primary health centre.

== History ==
Kuttanad, the rice bowl of Kerala, with its unending stretch of paddy fields, small streams and canals with lush green coconut palms, was well known even from the early periods of the Sangam age. History says this area had trade relations with ancient Greece and Rome in the Middle Ages. The early Cheras, who had their home in Kuttanad, were called `Kuttuvans`, so named after this place. Pliny and Ptolemy of the 1st and 2nd centuries had mentioned places like Purakkad or Barace in their classical works. The backwaters and wetlands host thousands of migrant common teal, ducks and cormorants every year who reach here from long distances. One of the major feature of this land is the region called Kuttanad, the 'granary of Kerala'. The average monthly temperature is 27C. Cochin International Airport, which is 107 kilometres to the North, is the closest airport. Thiruvananthapuram International Airport, 136 kilometres to the South, is the other airport that links the district with other countries.

== Schools ==
There are couple of schools in Neerattupuram, St Thomas Higher Secondary School, Titus Mar Thoma High School and Anaprampal North M T L P School function in the same campus.

Anaprampal North M T L P School may be the oldest. It was started somewhere near PanayannarKave temple. Later it was shifted to Mundakkal Chira. The management was entrusted to Thalavady Padinjarakara Marthoma Parish as the family of Mulackal willingly handed over the school to Thalavady Padinjarakara Marthoma Church. The management shifted the location of the school to present site. In 1957, the management was entrusted to Mar Thoma Schools Corporate management. Ever since they operate the school. For a long time the name was unofficially known as Mulackal School. There were a few other schools started by missionaries prior to this one. But this one survived and made possible universal elementary education in this area. Now the school does not have enough strength and the buildings are dilapidated.

== Nearby places ==
- Narakattaramukku
- Manattara
- Karikkuzhi
- Arthicherry
- Trikkayil
- Anaprambal
- Vellakkinar
- Edathua
- Parumala
- Thalavady
- Niranom
- Vyasapuram
