= State Highway 11 (Kerala) =

Road in Kerala, India

State Highway 11
- Alappuzha - Changanassery (AC) Road
- AC Road & AC Canal
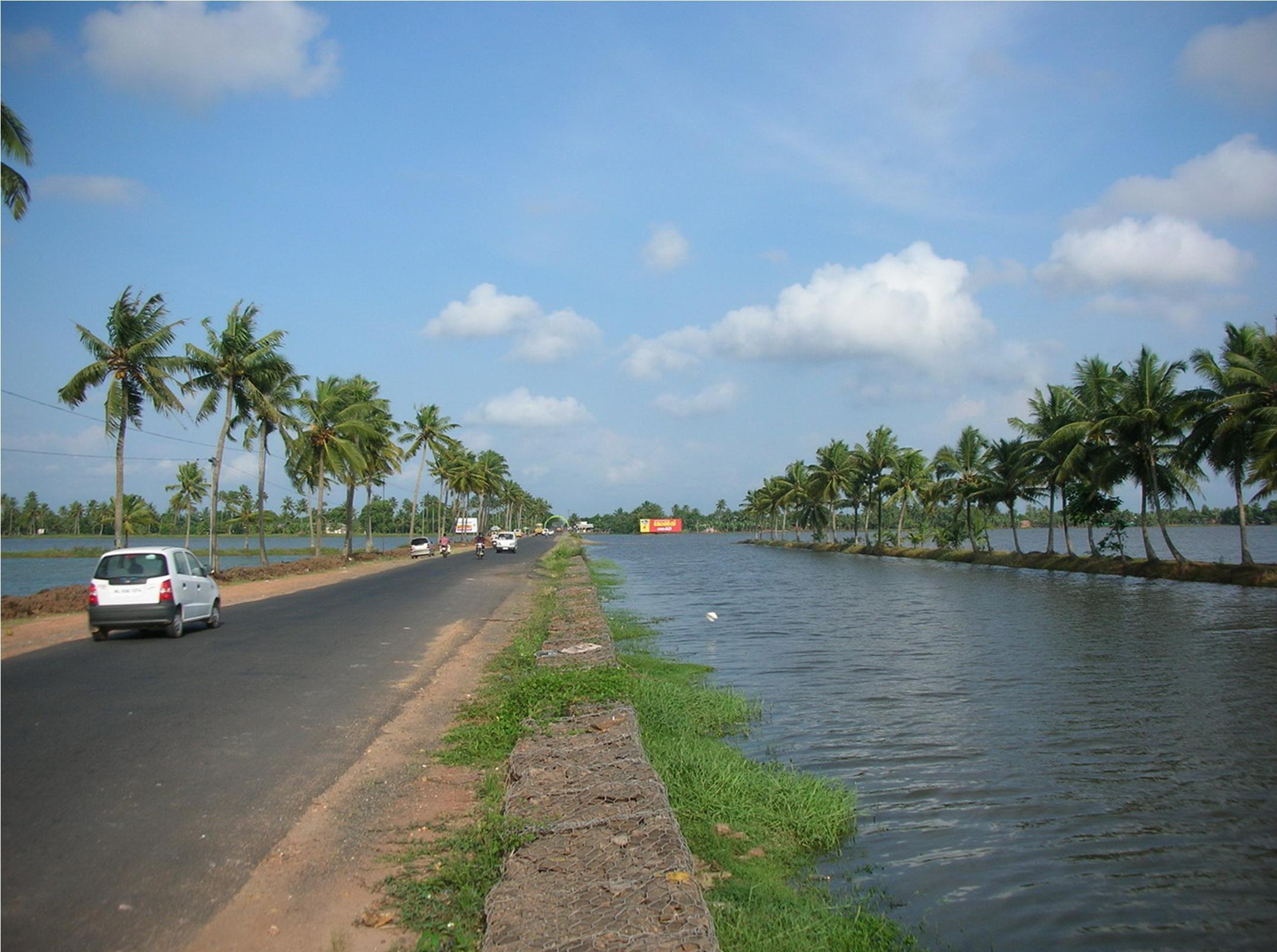

Route information
- Maintained by Kerala Public Works Department
- Length: 24.2 km (15.0 mi)

Major junctions
- West end: NH 66 in Alappuzha
- East end: SH 1 in Changanassery

Location
- Country: India
- State: Kerala
- Districts: Alappuzha, Kottayam

Highway system
- Roads in India; Expressways; National; State; Asian; State Highways in Kerala
← SH 10	→ SH 12

State Highway 11 (SH 11) is a State Highway in Kerala, India that starts in Kalarcode, Alappuzha and ends in Perunna, Changanassery.The road is popularly known as AC road (Alappuzha Changanassery) road. The highway is 24.2 km long.

== Route description ==
(starts from NH-47(NH-66 now), at Kalarcode) Alappuzha - Kainakary - Nedumudi - Ramankary -Kidangara - Changanassery (joins MC Road at Perunna). The road runs parallel to AC Canal. The A-C canal, which runs along 99% of the length of the road on its southern side is meant to empty the flood waters of upper Kuttanad into the Nedumudy river and the Pallathuruthy river near Alappuzha, which reach the Vembanad lake but did not come into effect so far, resulting in the submerging of the road even when the symptoms of a flood is seen in monsoon. The road crosses no. of canals and 3 rivers, namely Pallathuruthi, Nedumudi, and Kidangara, tributaries of Manimala and Pamba rivers. The 3 main bridges on the rivers were not constructed when it was opened. All the 3 bridges crossing the rivers were constructed later only ie., in the 1980s.

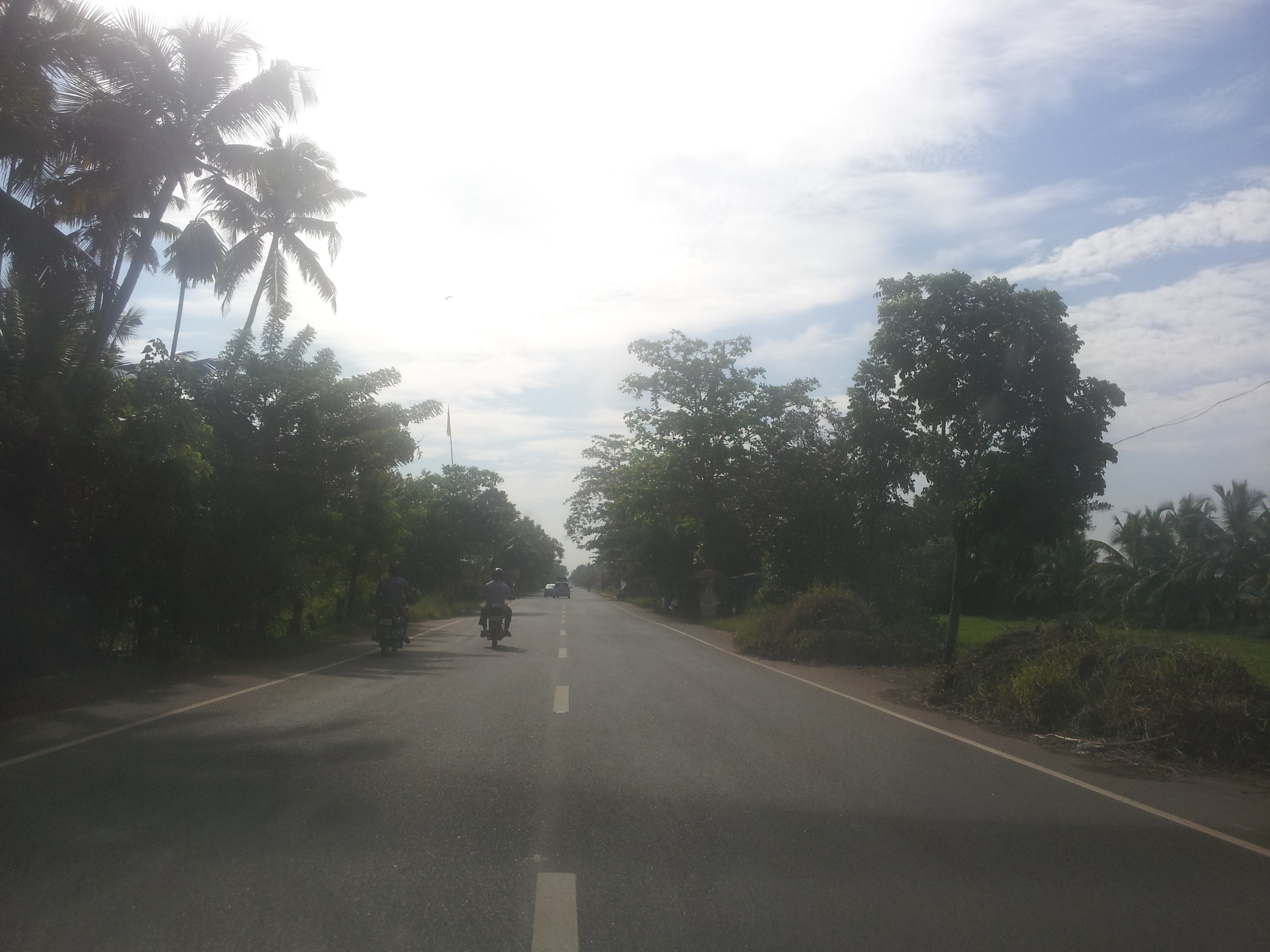
AC road near Nedumudi

AC Road is the first road which is passing through Kuttanad Paddy fields. The road passes through scenic paddy fields, coconut groves in Kuttanad and backwaters in Alappuzha.

== History ==
The Alappuzha-Changanassery Road was the concept of Sri. K. M. Korah, minister in the C. Kesavan ministry. Unlike other state highways, this road is unique, because 99% of the road is new road and not a conversion of existing pathways or village roads. It was completed and opened for traffic in 1958 by Sri. E.M.S Namboothiripad, the first Chief Minister of Kerala State. The road has been constructed parallel to the AC (Alappuzha-Changanassery) canal which is man made. Since the road was made through the paddy fields of Kuttanadu area, where paddy cultivation is done below sea level, the whole road is a reclaimed land made on the soil collected from the paddy fields received when the canal was made in the paddy field.

== Surveillance ==
The Motor Vehicles Department, in partnership with the Kerala Road Safety Authority (KRSA) and the police has installed automatic traffic enforcement camera systems in between various points of Changanassery - Alappuzha section of AC road for detecting speed violations of vehicles.

== Flooding in AC road ==
The AC road is prone to flooding during monsoon seasons in Kerala. As the road mostly passes through low-lying areas of Kuttanad, the road traffic is affected during heavy rains as parts of the road will be submerged in flood waters from Kuttanad.

== See also ==
- MC Road
- Roads in Kerala
- List of state highways in Kerala
