= Kodupunna Govinda Ganakan =

Indian multilingual scholar and essayist

Kodupunna Govinda Ganakan (1921–1988) was an Indian multilingual scholar and essayist, born in Koduppunna village of Kuttanadu in the state of Kerala. A Malayalam prose translation of Kālidāsa's Sanskrit lyric poem Meghadūta is one of his famous works.
