= Joseph Pallithanam =

Indian botanist

Joseph Mathen Pallithanam (1915–1984) was an Indian botanist. He was born to Mathachan (Vachaparampil) and Mariamma (Pallithanam) in Kainadyvillage of Kuttanadu. He belongs to a traditional agricultural family. His maternal uncle Pallithanthu Mathai Luka (Pallithanathu Kochu Mathan) pioneered the backwater kayal cultivation in Kuttanadu.

After his education, he became a priest in the Society of Jesus. He then completed a doctorate in botany, and became an instructor at St. Xaviers College, Tirunelveli Tamil Nadu, and then at St. Joseph's College, Tiruchirapalli. He dedicated his time to taxonomic studies and the compilation of florae.

Pallithanam was one of the first Indian Jesuit botanists. Though he had done considerable work in field of taxonomy, very little has been published; however, along with Father Balam of St. Joseph's College, he inspired scores of students to study the botany of India.

His book A Pocket Flora of the Sirumalai Hills South India is still considered as a notable work on South Indian flora; it is still cited in the scientific literature.
