= Kuttanad =

Kuttanad Kuttanadan Below Sea Level Farming Region
- Region
- GIAHS Kuttanad
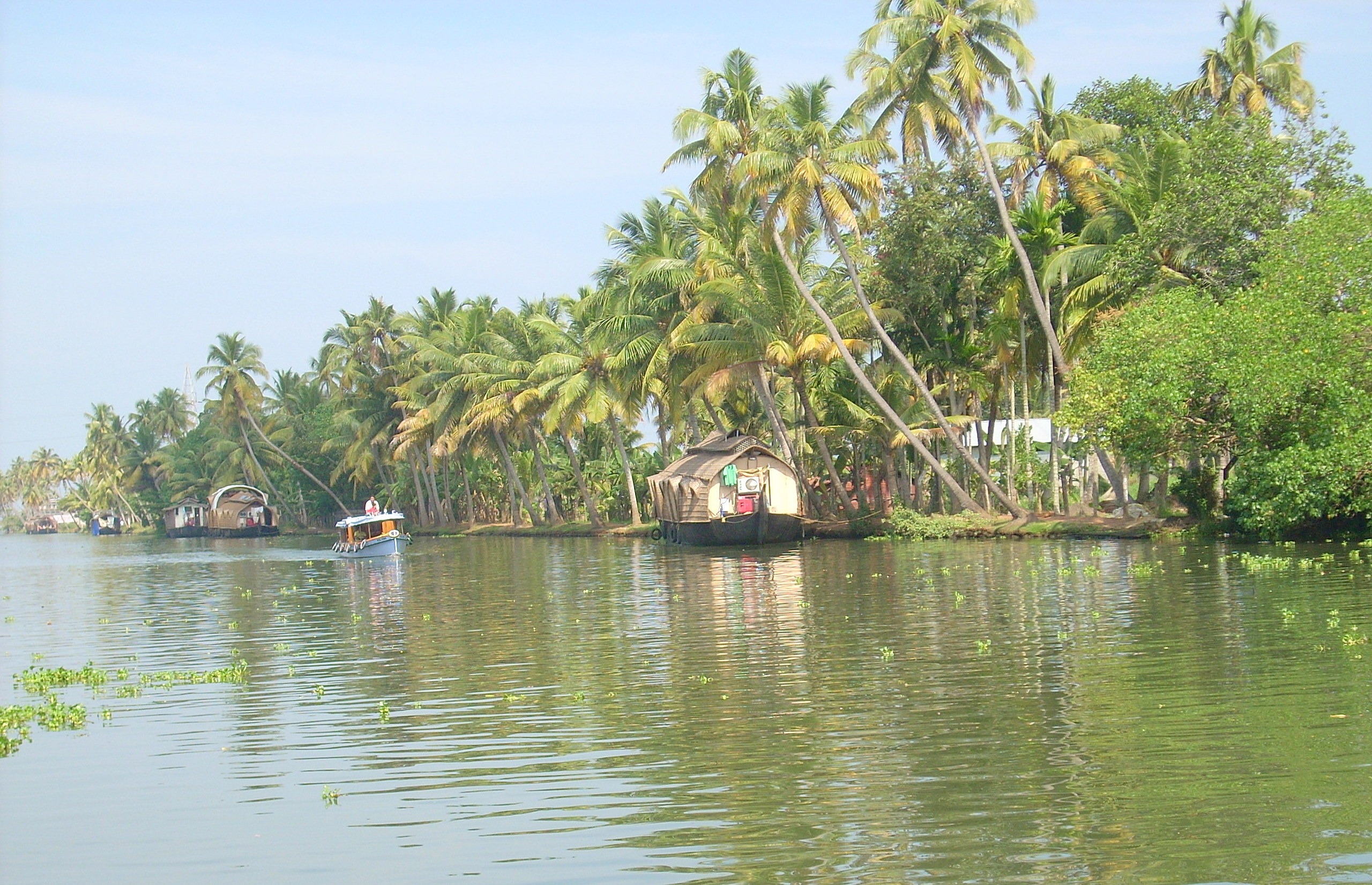
- Kettuvallams line up in the Kuttanad region
- Nicknames: Lowest Region of India, Lowest Region of the Indian subcontinent
- Location in Kerala, India Kuttanad (India)
- Coordinates: 9°25′30″N 76°27′50″E
- Country: India
- State: Kerala
- District: Alappuzha, Kottayam, Pathanamthitta
- Elevation: −2.7 m (−8.9 ft)

Languages
  - Official: Malayalam, English
- Time zone: UTC+5:30 (IST)
- PIN: 688-
- Telephone code: 0477
- Vehicle registration: KL 66
- Nearest city: Alappuzha, Kottayam, Changanassery, Thiruvalla
- Website: https://www.kuttanadan.com

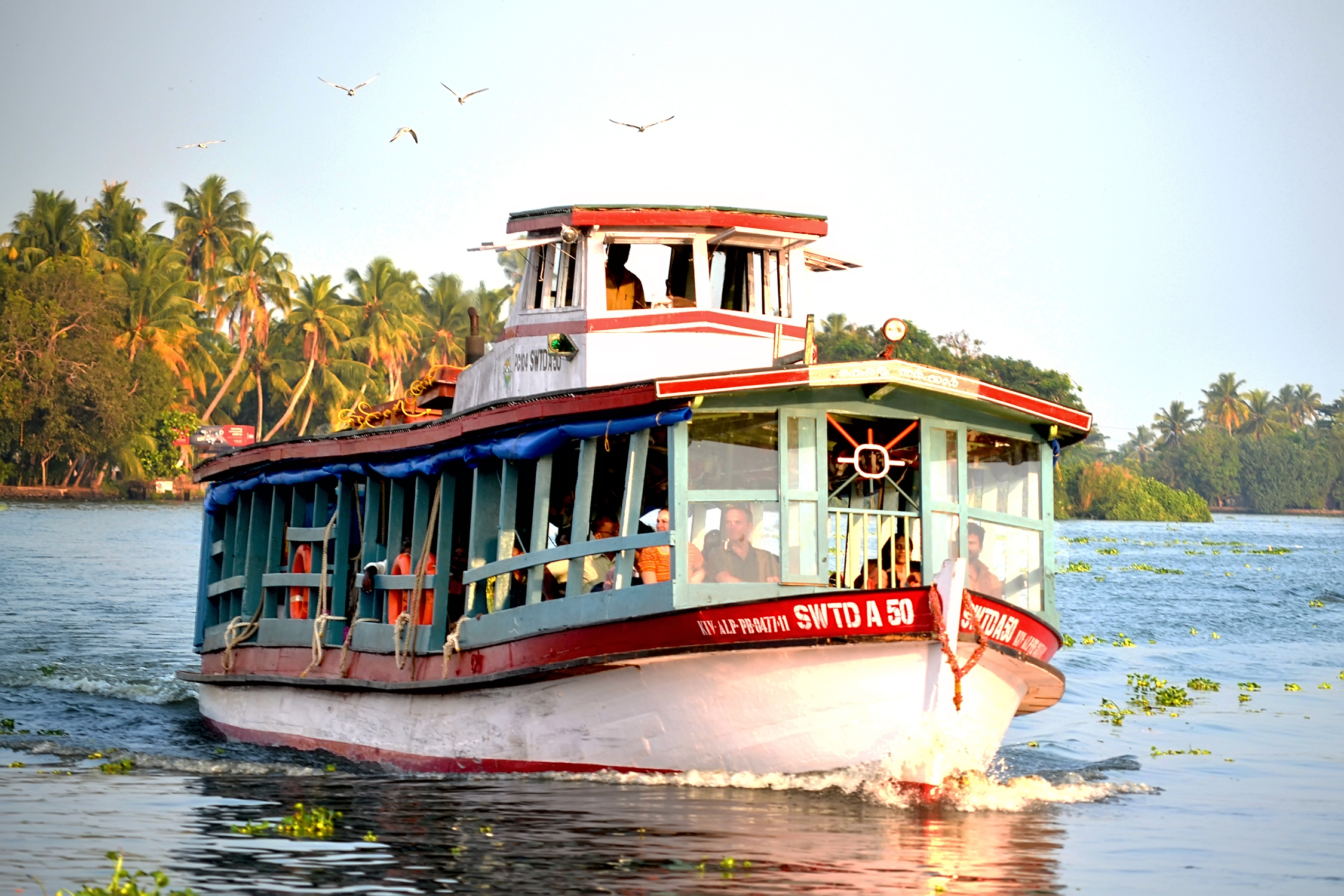
Public Transport Boat service in Kuttanadu

Kuttanad (Malayalam: [kuʈːɐnaːɖə̆]) is a river delta landscape region in the state of Kerala, India, known for its vast paddy fields and geographical peculiarities. It is in the districts of Alappuzha, Kottayam and Pathanamthitta. The region has the lowest altitude in India and is one of the few places in the world where farming is carried on around 1.2 to 3.0 metres (4 to 10 ft) below sea level, using rice paddies largely located on reclaimed land amid the delta. Kuttanad is historically important in the ancient history of South India and is the major rice producer in the state. Farmers of Kuttanad are famous for biosaline farming. The United Nations Food and Agriculture Organization (FAO) has declared the Kuttanad Farming System as a Globally Important Agricultural Heritage System (GIAHS) in 2013.

Four of Kerala's major rivers, the Pamba, Meenachil, Achankovil and Manimala flow into the region. It is well known for its boat race in the Punnamada Backwaters, known in Malayalam as Vallamkalli.

== History ==
The first recorded history of this land is obtained from the Sangam period literature. According to the Sangam era texts, Uthiyan Cheralathan ('Perum Chorru Udiyan Cheralathan, Athan I or Udiyanjeral) is the first recorded Chera dynasty ruler of the Sangam period in ancient Kerala.

He had his capital at a place called Kuzhumur in Kuttanad (central Kerala) and expanded the kingdom northward and eastward from his original homeland. His lifetime is broadly determined to be between first century BC and 2nd century AD. His queen was Veliyan Nallini, the daughter of Veliyan Venman. Uthiyan Cheralathan was a contemporary of the Chola ruler Karikala Chola. He is praised for his elephant corps and cavalry. Present day Changanassery end of Kuttanad was the capital of the Chera dynasty king Uthiyan Cheralathan. The native place of the Kuttuva tribe came to be known as Kuttanadu. According to sangam literature, Uthiyan Cheralathan was defeated in the Battle of Venni against Karikala Chola and the capital was burnt down.

Kuttanad is named after the Chera king Cheran Chenkuttuvan. The name means "Land of the Kuttuvan." Cheran Chenkuttuvan, also known as Kadal Pirakottiya Vel Kelu Kuttuvan ("the Kuttuvan who pushed back the sea"), is credited with reclaiming land from the sea, part of which became Kuttanad. Another theory is that Kuttanad was once believed to be a wild forest with dense tree growth which was destroyed subsequently by a wild fire. Chuttanad (place of the burnt forest), was eventually called Kuttanad. However, this theory is not widely accepted, as there is no historical or linguistic evidence supporting the existence of Chuttanad as an earlier name. Additionally, geology of the place suggest that Kuttanad was a reclaimed marine ecosystem rather than a forest destroyed by fire and the purported 'charred wood' findings just peatified organic matter.

== Geography ==
=== Divisions ===
The Kuttanad region is categorised into:

- Lower Kuttanad
- Upper Kuttanad
- North Kuttanad

Lower Kuttanadu comprises taluks of Ambalapuzha, Nedumudy, Kuttanadu (excluding Edathua, Thalavady, Kidangara and Muttar), and the northern half of Karthikapally taluk in Alappuzha district.

Upper Kuttanad comprises Veeyapuram, Pallippad and Cheruthana in Karthikapally taluk, Edathua, Thalavady, Kidangara and Muttar in Kuttanad taluk; Chennithala and Thripperumthura villages in Mavelikkara taluk; Mannar, Kurattissery, Budhanoor, Ennakkad villages in Chengannur taluk of Alappuzha district; and Parumala, Kadapra, Niranam, Pulikeezhu, Nedumpuram, Chathenkary, Peringara, and Kavumbhagam villages in Pathanamthitta district.

North Kuttanad comprises Vaikom taluk, western parts of Kottayam taluk, and western parts of Changanacherry taluk in Kottayam district.

=== Villages ===
Kuttanad's major villages include Kainakary, Chathenkary, Ramankary, Puthukkary, Chennamkary, Nedumudi, Niranam, Kaipuzha, Edathua, Mampuzhakkary, Neelamperoor, Kainady, Kavalam, Pulincunnoo, Manalady, Kannady Kayalpuram, Veliyanadu, Veeyapuram, Vezhapra, Kunnamkary, Kumaramkary, Valady, Kidangara, Mithrakary, Muttar, Neerattupuram, Thalavadi, Changankary, Pandankary, Champakulam, Nedumudi, Moonnatummukham, Melpadom, Pulincunnu, Pallippad, Payippad, Karichal, Ayaparambu, Anary, Vellamkulangara, Pilappuzha, Pandi, Edathua, Pacha, Chekkidikad, Thakazhy, Cheruthana, Karuvatta, Chennithala, Narakathara, Venattukad, Kayalppuram, Mankompu, Chathurthiakary, Koduppunna, Oorukkary, Thayankary, Thiruvarpu, Kumarakom, Arpookara, Pullangadi, Payattupakka, and Kandankary.

== Backwater paddy cultivation (Kayal cultivation) ==
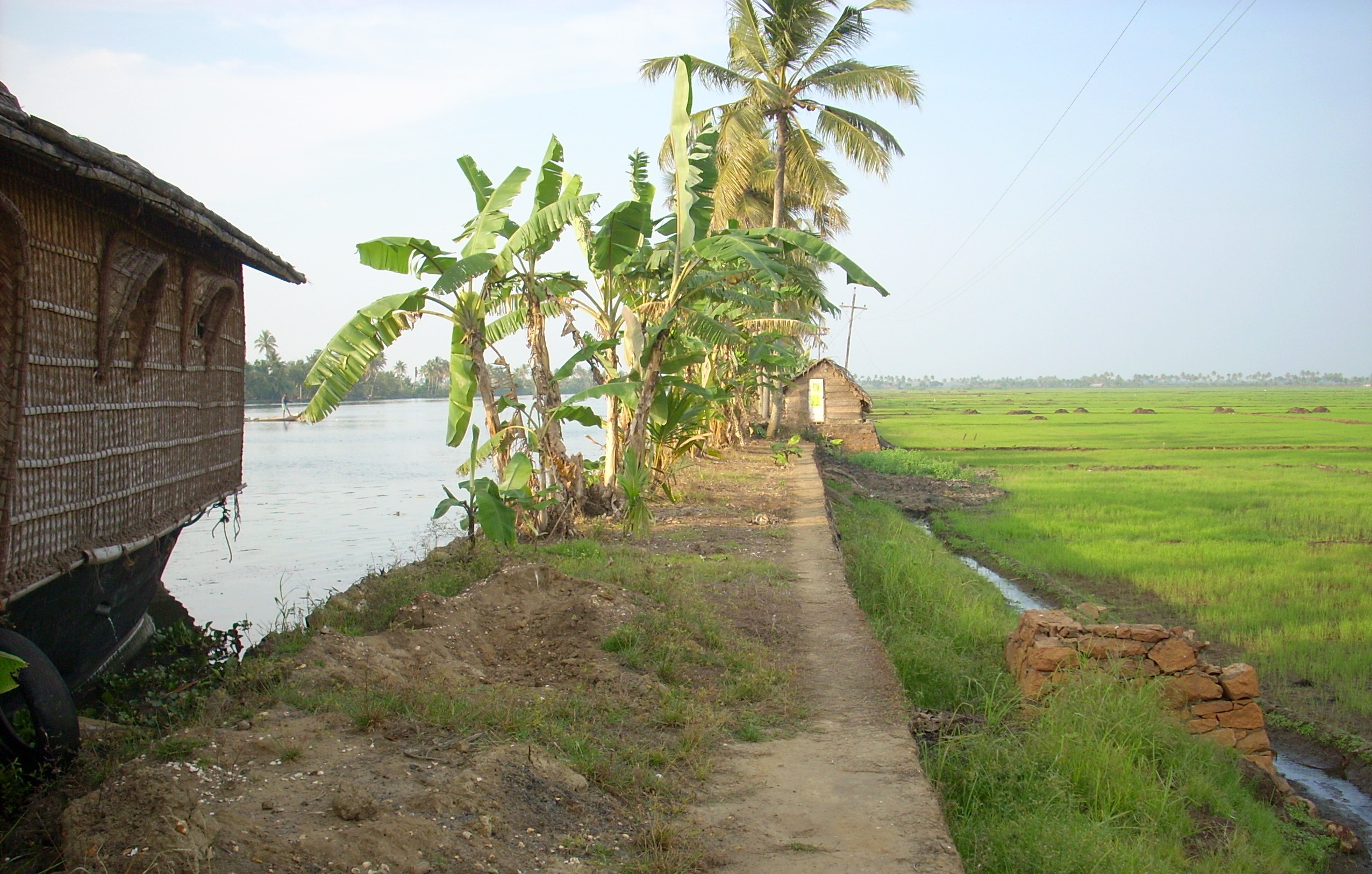
Paddy fields in Kuttanad

The major occupation in Kuttanadu is farming, with rice the most important agricultural product. This activity gives the area its moniker of "The Rice Bowl of Kerala". Large farming areas near Vembanad Lake were reclaimed from the lake. The history of paddy cultivation in Kuttanad can be traced back centuries. The evolution of paddy cultivation correlated with technological advancement and changes in the regulatory framework that existed during the 19th and 20th centuries. In earlier times, reclamation was carried out mainly from the shallow part of the Vembanad Lake or from the periphery of the Pamba River. These reclamations constituted small areas of paddy fields called padasekharams. Bailing out of water from the fields was done manually using water wheels called chakram. Gradually the manual method used for bailing out of water gave way to steam engines.

There were robberies in Kuttanad in earlier days, which were prohibited by the Travancore Maharajah Moolam Thirunal.

Three distinct stages can be identified in the reclamation of kayal lands from the lake. The first stage was carried out by private entrepreneurs without any financial support from the government. The Pattom Proclamation made by the Travencore Kingdom in 1865, gave a great fillip to reclamation activities between 1865 and 1888. During this period de-watering of the polders was done manually using chakram, which restricted large-scale reclamation. Only about 250 hectares of land were reclaimed during this period. Venadu Kayal and Madathil Kayal were reclaimed during this period and are considered the first "Kayal Nilams" to be reclaimed from the Vembanad Lake. These pioneering reclamation activities in kayal cultivation were made by the two brothers Mathai Luka Pallithanam and Ouseph Luka Pallithanam from Kainady village in Kuttanadu.

The second phase started during 1888. One of the reclamation projects during this period was undertaken by Chalayil Eravi Kesava Panicker. He chose to reclaim Vembanad kayal from the mouth of the Chennamkari river as it joins with the backwaters. The reclaimed kayal was known as 'Attumuttu Kayal.' Other major reclamation in the same year was Seminary Kayal, which was undertaken by Kottayam Orthodox Seminary.

The introduction of kerosene engines for dewatering resulted in the reclamation of wider areas of the lake for cultivation. This made farmers consider venturing into the deeper parts of the lake. During the period between 1898 and 1903, reclamation activity was led by Pallithanam Luca Mathai (alias Pallithanathu Mathaichen), who reclaimed the Cherukara Kayal and Pallithanam Moovayiram Kayal. But the second phase (1890 to 1903) of reclamation activities came to a halt because of the ban on kayal reclamation imposed by the Madras Government in 1903. Cherukali Kayal, Rajapuram Kayal, Aarupanku Kayal, Pantharndu Panku Kayal, and Mathi Kayal were the other major reclamations during this period.

In 1912, the Madras Government approved a proposal from the Travancore Government for further reclamations in three stages. Under this scheme, Kayal land was notified for reclamation in blocks, each named with a letter of the English alphabet. Out of the total area of 19,500 acres of kayal land, 12,000 acres were reclaimed between 1913 and 1920. After the removal of the ban in 1913, Pallithanam Luca Matthai along with some other prominent families in Kuttanadu, reclaimed E-Block Kayal, measuring a total area of 2,400 acres. This is the biggest Kayal Nilam in Kuttanadu. C.J. Kurian, Ex MLC, and Mr. John Illikalam were his main partners in this venture. The reclamations between 1914 and 1920, known as the new reclamations, were carried out in three periods. In the first period, Blocks A to G, measuring 6300 acres, were reclaimed. C Block, D Block (Attumukham Aarayiram (Attumuttu Kayal), Thekke Aarayiram, and Vadakke Aarayiram), E Block (Erupathinalayiram Kayal), F Block (Judge's Aarayiram Kayal), and G Block (Kochu Kayal) are the major Kayal Nilams reclaimed during this period.

During the second period of new reclamation, blocks H to N, covering an area of 3600 acres, were reclaimed under the leadership of Pallithanam Luca Matthai, Cunnumpurathu Kurien, Vachaparampil Mathen, Pazhayaparmpil Chacko, Kunnathusseril Peious, Ettuparayil Xavier, and Pattassery PP Mathai. During the third period of new reclamation, R Block Kayal, covering 1,400 acres, was reclaimed by the joint efforts of eight families led by then member of Sree Moolam Popular Assembly, Pallithanam Luca Matthai. His partners in the reclamation included Vachaparampil Mathen, Pazhayaparmpil Chacko, Ettuparayil Xavier, Pattassery PP Mathai, Kaarikkuzhi Ponnada Vaakkaal Mathulla Mappila (E & F block), Meledom, Paruthickal, and Kandakudy. Once, while the king of Travancore visited the Erupathinalayiram Kayal, he was pleased and told Kaarikkuzhi Mathulla Mappila that he should have bought a Ponnada to honor him. Since he has not bought a Ponnada, he presented "Ponnada Vaakkaal" (Ponnada by word). Thereafter his house was known as Ponnadavaakkaal.

From 1920 to 1940 reclamation activity came to a halt because of a steep drop in the price of rice.

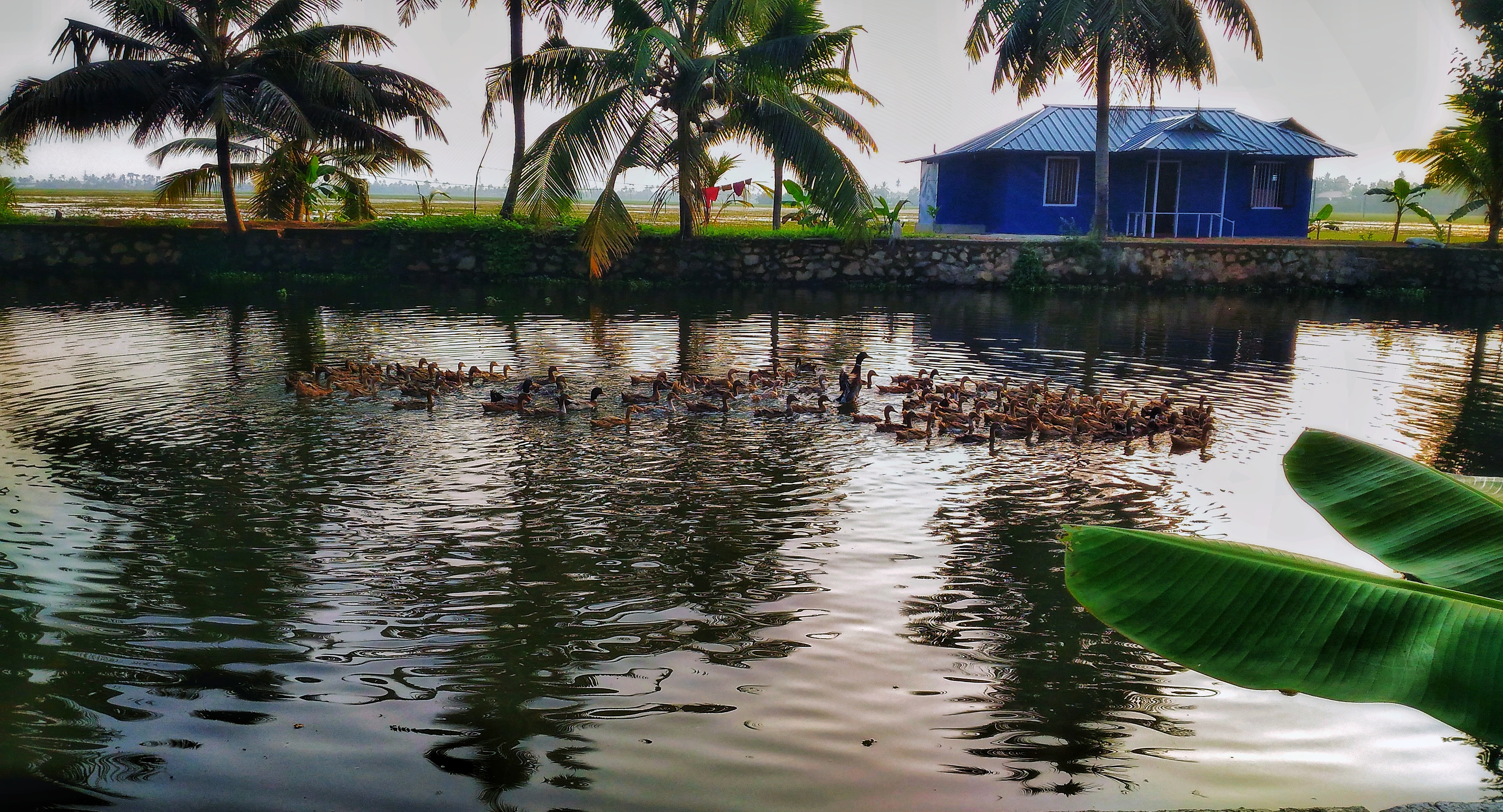
Kuttanad beauty

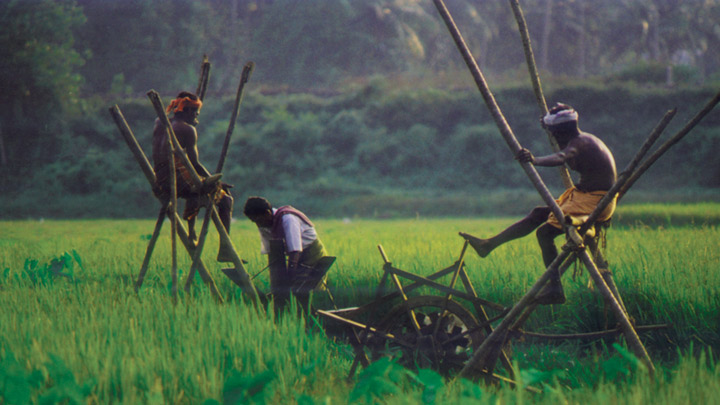
Farmers using traditional water turbines in a rice field

Due to the steep decline in the price of rice between 1920 and 1940, reclamation activities slowed down, but they gained momentum again in the early 1940s. During this period, in order to increase agricultural output, a government initiated the "Grow More Food" campaign, and the provision of incentives encouraged new reclamations. The advent of electric motors made reclamation relatively easier, cheaper, and less risky as compared to earlier periods. The last tract of the reclamations, namely the Q, S, and T block, was made during this period by Joseph Murickan (Muricken Outhachan) and his wife's family, Puthanppura Panchara (Veliyanadu).

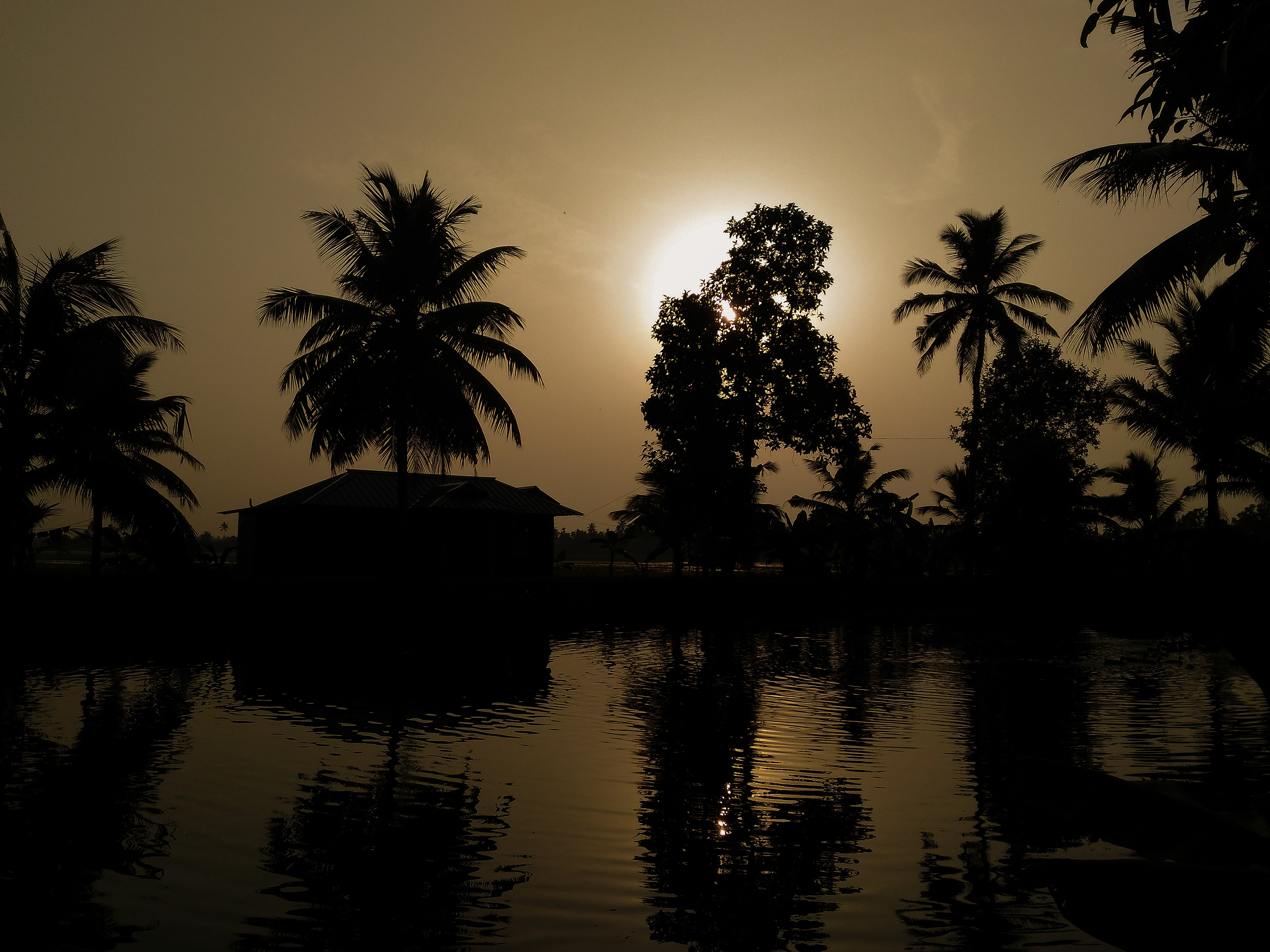
Kuttanad Kerala

As farming in the area increased, farmers felt themselves constrained by the two cycles a year for rice cultivation. The reason for which is the limited availability of potable water in Kuttanadu. During the monsoon seasons, the water from the mountains flows through the rivers to the sea, bringing potable water to Kuttanadu. But during summer, due to the low level of the region, seawater enters Kuttanadu, significantly increasing the salinity of the water and making it unpotable.

Kuttanad is also recognised as a Globally Important Agricultural Heritage Systems (GIAHS) by FAO.

== Thottappally Spillway ==
The Thottappally Spillway project was designed as a permanent solution to the flood situation in Kuttanad. This programme was envisaged in such a way that floodwaters from Pamba, Manimalayar, and Achankovil were diverted to the sea before they reached Vembanad Lake. The spillway was commissioned in 1955.

In 1968, the Government of India proposed that a bund be made across the river so that seawater would not be allowed to come inside Kuttanad during summer, allowing farmers to cultivate an extra crop per year. The project was planned in three phases: the south side, the north side, and another phase to join the two sections. The project was delayed, and by the time the first two phases were complete, the entire money allotted for the project had run out and left the final phase in limbo. The farmers who were expecting many financial benefits after the completion of the project decided to take matters into their own hands, and one night in 1972, a large group of farmers filled the gap between the north and the south side with earth. To this day, the earth embankment between the two sections of the bund remains. With this, it was possible to close the regulator of shutters during December–June when the saline water enters and then open it during the monsoon. Once the Thanneermukkam bund and spillway became operational, two crops were possible in Kuttanad.

Even though the bund has improved the quality of life of the farmers, the bund is alleged to have caused severe environmental problems. The backwaters, which were abundant with fish and part of the staple food of the people of the region, require a small amount of salt water for their breeding. The bund has caused deterioration of fish varieties in the region, and the fishermen are opposed to the bund as of 2005. The bund has also disrupted the harmony of the sea with the backwaters and has caused problems not foreseen before the bund, like the omnipresence of the water weeds. Before the creation of the bund, the saltwater tended to cleanse the backwaters, but this no longer occurs, leading to pollution of the backwaters and the nearby land.

== Notable natives and residents ==
- Kavalam Sreekumar, singer
- Pallithanam Luca Matthai, former member of Sree Moolam Popular Assembly and pioneer of kayal cultivation in Kuttanad.
- Renji Panicker, actor, director, writer, and journalist
- K. K. Nayar, administrator and politician.
- Nedumudi Venu, actor
- K. Ayyappa Panikkar
- Kavalam Narayana Panikkar
- Thakazhi Sivasankara Pillai, novelist, Jnanpith scholar
- Vinayan, film director.
- K. M. Panikkar, scholar, journalist, historian, administrator, diplomat
- K P Sasidharan, Malayalam academic, writer
- Baselios Geevarghese II, Kallasseri Bava, Kurichy, 16th Malankara Metropolitan and 3rd Catholicos of Malankara Church
- Kuriakose Elias Chavara, Indian saint
- John Abraham, film director
- Kunchacko Boban, film actor and producer
- Saji Thomas, sportsman
- I C Chacko, physicist and geologist, state geologist of Travancore State from 1906 to 1921
- Thomas Chandy, MLA, politician
- Ramesh Chennithala, former Minister, UDF political leader
- Guru Gopinath, Indian classical dancer
- K. C. Joseph, politician, former MLA
- Kunchacko, film producer and director
- Mar Thomas Kurialacherry, former archbishop
- Mar James Kalacherry, former archbishop
- Oommen Mathew, politician, former MLA
- Venu Nagavally, film actor and director
- Mankompu Sivasankara Pillai - Kathakali artist of the classical dance-drama's southern style
- Ponkunnam Varkey, novelist
- Sebastian Xavier, Indian Olympic swimmer

== Politics ==
The Kuttanad Assembly constituency used to be part of the Alappuzha Lok Sabha constituency. After the Lok Sabha delimitation in 2008, it now belongs to the Mavelikkara constituency.

== See also ==
- Haripad
- Kayamkulam
- Kunnumma
- Mavelikara
- Thekkekara
