= Narakathara =

- village
- Location in Kerala, India Narakathara (India)
- Coordinates: 9°28′0″N 76°28′0″E
- Country: India
- State: Kerala
- District: Alappuzha

Languages
  - Official: Malayalam, English
- Time zone: UTC+5:30 (IST)
- PIN: 688506
- Vehicle registration: KL-66

Narakathara is a village in Kuttanad on the boat route between Kottayam and Alappuzha.

Earlier accessible only via the water, there is now significant road penetration in this area. The primary occupation of most people in this area is agriculture on lush paddy fields.

Even though it is a backwater region the place is well connected by roads and lakes.

The temple in Narakathara 'Kannakott Temple ' has a major shrine for Sree Bhadrakali and Lord's Shiva with other Hindu lords.

In Narakathara there is a government school, primary health centre, post office and cooperative society (run by the native people).
