= Lower Kuttanad =

- village
- Country: India
- State: Kerala
- District: Alappuzha

Languages
  - Official: Malayalam, English
- Time zone: UTC+5:30 (IST)
- Vehicle registration: KL-
- Coastline: 0 kilometres (0 mi)
- Climate: Tropical monsoon (Köppen)
- Avg. summer temperature: 35 °C (95 °F)
- Avg. winter temperature: 20 °C (68 °F)

Lower Kuttanad comprises taluks of Ambalapuzha, Kuttanad (excluding Edathua, Thalavady and Muttar villages) and northern half of Karthikapally taluk in Alappuzha district, Kerala, India.

It is said to be the lowest elevation area in India.
