= Vellakkinar =

- village
- Location in Kerala, India Vellakkinar (India)
- Country: India
- State: Kerala
- District: Alappuzha

Languages
  - Official: Malayalam, English
- Time zone: UTC+5:30 (IST)
- Vehicle registration: KL-

Vellakkinar or Vellakinar is the fourth ward of the village panchayat of Thalavady in Alappuzha district, Kuttanad taluk, in the State of Kerala, India. Its name is derived from water well (vellakkinar) that was located at Vellakkinar Junction.

== Local government ==
Vellakinar ward is the fifth local government ward in Thalavady Grama Panchayat, one of fifteen wards that each elect a member to its Local Self Government standing committee. As of 2020, its elected member is Binu Suresh of the Bharatiya Janata Party.

== Transport ==
Vellakkinar is 11 km from Thiruvalla Railway Station. Other nearby stations are Haripad, Thakazhy, Ambalappuzha, Alappuzha.
