= Kavalam =

- Village
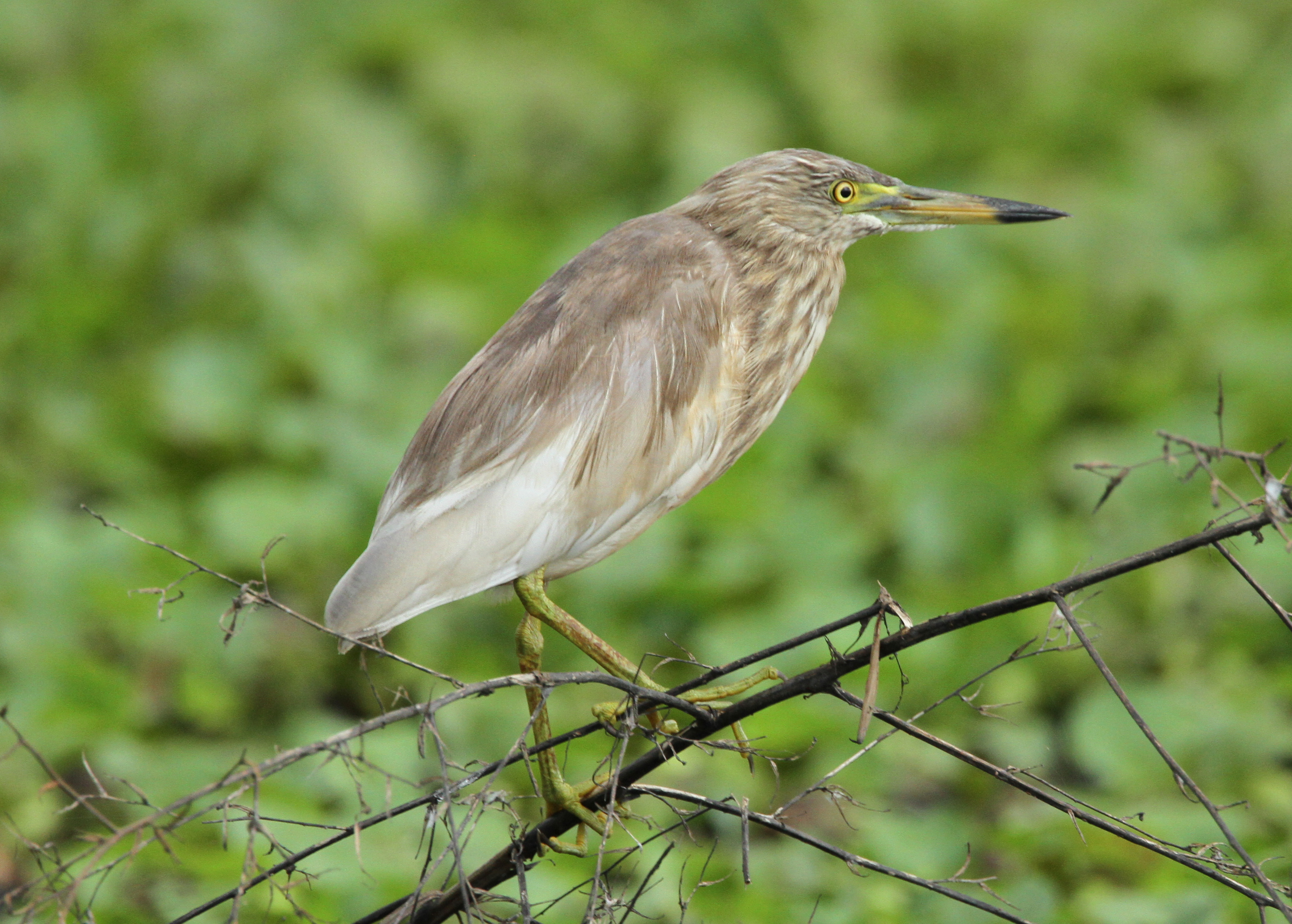
- Pond Heron spotted at Kavalam
- Interactive map of Kavalam
- Coordinates: 9°29′0″N 76°26′0″E
- Country: India
- State: Kerala
- District: Alappuzha

Languages
  - Official: Malayalam, English
- Time zone: UTC+5:30 (IST)
- Vehicle registration: KL-66

Kavalam is a village located in Upper Kuttanadu, Kerala state, Alappuzha District. Positioned along the Pamba River, it is part of the unique low-lying agricultural belt where cultivation occurs below sea level. The village plays a role in the region’s intricate network of canals and waterways, which serve both transport and irrigation purposes.

== Location ==
Kavalam is located on the borders of Alapuzha and Kottayam districts, on the banks of Vembanad Lake.

== Environment ==
The Pampa river flows through the village to merge into Vembanad Lake. The natural environment has been used as a location by many filmmakers.

The area is interspersed with the kayals (canals) and lakes. The lakes and kayals are filled with flocks of ducks, and in summer the rice paddies of Kuttanad turn golden. With a longtime history behind it, Kavalam is part of Kerala's cultural folklore.

== History ==
A decade ago, the village was accessible only by the lake boats provided by the government of Kerala. The place is now accessible from Alleppey, Kottayam and Changanacherry by road. Kavalam addtionally is the location of a confluence of five canals.

== Snake Boat race ==
The village has a snake boat named Kavalam Chundan, which is a regular participant in the snakeboat Vallamkali races. Kavalam Chundan is the subject of the legendary film song of the 1960s "Kuttanadan Punchayile Kochu penne, Kuyilaale."

== Notable people and families ==
- Kavalam Madhava Panikkar - Diplomat, administrator, historian
- Kavalam Narayana Panicker - Poet, dramatist
- Kavalam Sreekumar - Poet
- Joseph Murickan
- The Nilavumthara family is one of the major and prominent families that reside in Kunumma, Kerala. This family's lineage can be traced back to the Brahmin clave Kalikavu/Kaliyankal. The Nilavumthara family also boasts an 300 year old ancestral home that dates back to when Syrian Christian families began erecting more durable nalukettu/talukettu homes, after centuries of matrilineal customs yielding to patrilineal or nuclear family structures.
