= Payippad =

Village in Alappuzha District, Kerala, India

Coordinates: 9.324°N 76.461°E

Payippad is a village in Alappuzha district in the state of Kerala, India. The village is situated about 4 km north of Harippad (the nearest town) on the Harippad, Veeyapuram road. Payippad is better known for the Payippad boat race.Payipad boat race is conducted on 4th (Chathayam) day of Main Onam Celebrations.
