= Manattara =

- village
- Country: India
- State: Kerala
- District: Alappuzha

Languages
  - Official: Malayalam, English
- Time zone: UTC+5:30 (IST)
- Vehicle registration: KL-

Manattara is nearby place of Neerattupuram. It is an Upper Kuttanad area and the bank of Pampa River. It is home to the old Subramanya temple.

Ramavarmapurathu Tharavadu was located in Manattara. "Judge Ammavan" who is worshipped in the famous "Cheruvally Devi Temple" hails from this family. The original Tharavadu got branched into different families like Ramavarmapurathu-Thoppil, Ramavarmapurathu-Madothilaraodu, and Ramavarmapurathu-Padinjareveedu.
