= Manakkattu Devi Temple =

Hindu temple in Kerala, India

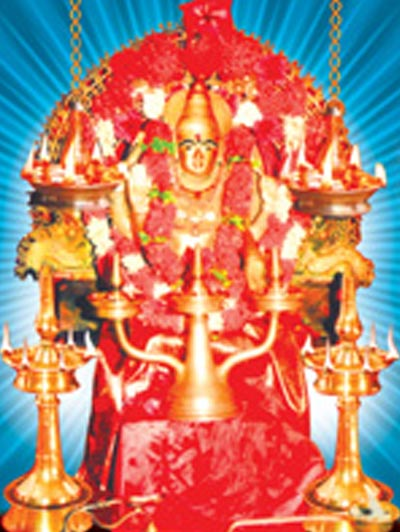
- Manakkattu Devi

- Manakkattu Devi Temple, Pallippad, Alappuzha, Kerala

Religion
- Affiliation: Hinduism
- District: Alappuzha
- Deity: Bhuvaneswari
- Festivals: Thiru Utsavam, Parayeduppu

Location
- Location: Harippad, Pallippad
- State: Kerala
- Country: India
- Interactive map of Manakkattu Devi Temple
- Coordinates: 9°15′28.3″N 76°28′52.3″E

Architecture
- Type: Kerala Style

Specifications
- Temple: One
- Elevation: 27.49 m (90 ft)

Website
- www.manakkattudevitemple.com

Manakkattu Devi Temple is a temple in Kerala. The temple is located at Pallippad in Karthikappalli taluk of Alappuzha district in the south Indian state Kerala. It is situated about 4 km east of Harippad on Nangiarkulangara Mavelikkara road. It comes under four NSS Karayogams (Thekkummuri, Kottakkakam, Naduvattom and Thekkekkara kizhakku)

== Temple history ==
Long before at the time before at Dvapra yuga, these areas were included in Khandava forest. Arjuna sent his arrow as per the advice of Bhagavan Sree Krishna from eythooru (എയ്ത്തൂര്) later known as Evoor, where is famous Sree krishna swami temple is situated. After Khandavadahana the temples in this area got fire. after decades a farmer lady on the way to punja kandam tries to sharpen her bow shaped knife in the stone. Suddenly blood came from the stone. The frightened lady went to the prominent Brahin Family Kochoor Madam and informed the incident. The highest priest came down and find Sree Bhuvaneswary idol there. He made the idol was consecrated priestly near to the old shasta temple which was consecrated by Parasu Rama. The area where Sree ponnu Manakkattamma's idol got is known as valiya manakkattu kaavu.

Manakkattamma is in the form of Sree Bhuvaneswari. The mother of all Godssess includes Brahma Vishnu and Siva. She is the Prakruthi. Manakkattu Temple rituals are entirely different. It has three different poojas on three daily occasions for Durga, Lakshmi and Saraswathi like Mookambika devi.

Kadumpayasam, Therali are important prasada for amma.

== Valyachan (Sree Kunjekutty Pilla Sarvadhi Karyakkar) ==
Valiyachan is the most important Sub deity in Sree Manakkadu Devi temple. He was the army chief of Dharma Raja Karthika Thirunal Rama Varma and the key person who made the Victory over Tippu Sultan. Kunje Kutty pilla was born at Evoor but his mother's house was Nadalikkal Madam near to Manakkattu devi temple. Valiyachan was the most trusted devotee to Manakkattu Amma. His history was noted down in Aitheeha Mala by Kottarathil Sankunny. After his army service, Valyachan was select for his life to be a servant to Manakkattu amma until he went to Vanaprastha. It's believed that he hailed to moksha during Vanaprastha.

Valyachan is really an eternal presence in the Manakattu Devi Temple. There have been many incidents in the past and present about Valyachan. Valyachan has another temple near the Natalikkal Math, also known as the Natalikkal Temple. Until recently, the temple celebrated his birthday.In addition, the senior person in the family will always be under the soul-control of the Valyachan and act as him. He only touches the banana with Valyachan's sword, but the bunches are cut in two. During a festival, some people try to test the Valyachan, and they put the turret which used to grind pulses, inside the banana stalk. The man who was under the control of Valyachan's spirit became angry and ordered him to bring the turbulent banana in front of him, and to everyone's surprise to saw the cut that had been placed inside the stalk. However, Valyachan announce that there was no need for such an event and that the festival at the Natalikkal temple was canceled forever. There are still people in this country who have seen it firsthand.

== Sree Dharmma Shastha Temple ==
Sree Dharmma Shastha Temple was there before. It has been believed for centuries that Sri Dharma Sastha was consecrated by Sri Parasu Raman. But the Temple was demolished for reconstruction and nothing has been done for last 10 years. Sree dharmma Sastha Prathishta was relocated to balalaya which is very painful to devotees. The Temple authority is failed to do something for this.

== Other Sub-deities ==
There are many Upadevathas (sub-deities) adjacent to the temple. The main Upadevathas in the temple premises are:

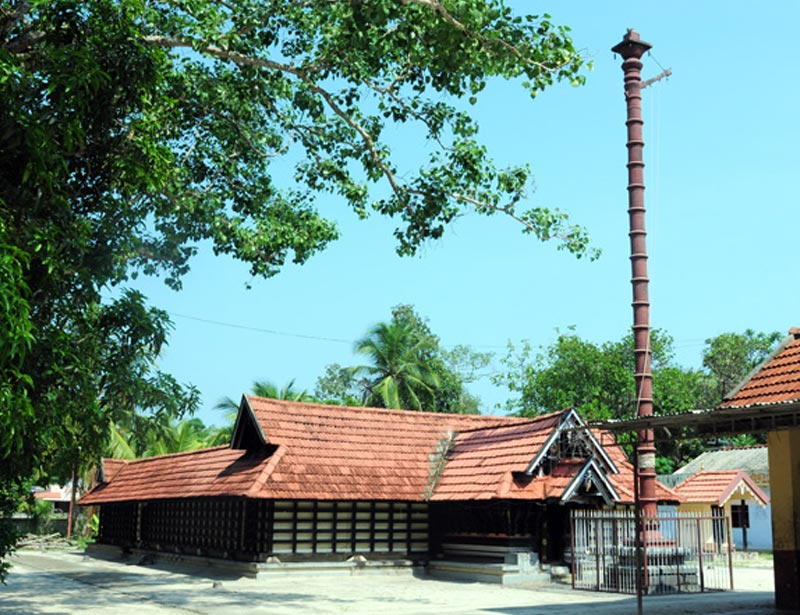
The main Temple.

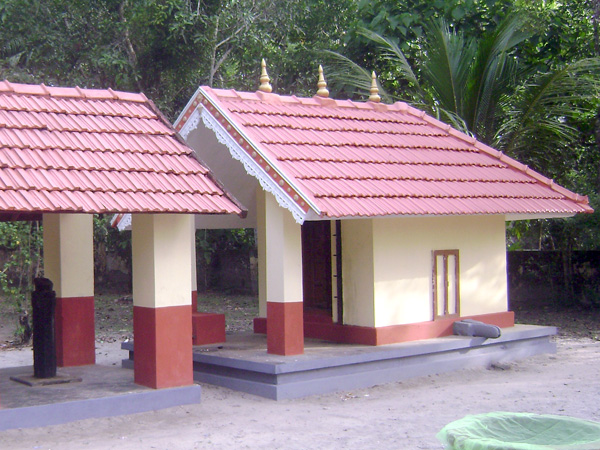
Shaastha Temple(old)

- Yakshi
- Madaswami
- Nagarajav
- Muhurthi
- Rekshas

== Festivals ==
The Temple has two major festivals and a number of festivals.

Period	Event
Chingam 1	Niraputhari
Navaraatri	Navaraatri Pooja
Vrischikam 1	Chirappu
Vrischikam 21, 22	Kolam
Vrischikam 24	Kodiyettu Utsavam
Dhanu 1	Aaraattu
Makara Bharani	Bhagavathippara (Harippad area)
Shivaraatri	Bhagavathippara
Midhunam 13	Sreemad Bhaagavatha Navaha Yanjam
Midhunam 21	Prathista Varshikam, Valiya Guruthi

== Parayeduppu ==
In the numerous temples of Onattukara, the "Parayeduppu" period is the festival season. It all begins when the deity ("Devi") of Manakkattu Devi temple is taken out in procession for Parayeduppu on the Bharani star of the Malayalam month Makaram. The main part of Parayeduppu is the Jeevathaconstructed in the model of the temple structure itself. The rhythms used during Jeevatha Ezunnallathu (procession) are quite noteworthy. Starting with very slow beats, it builds up a crescendo and ends in fast beats. The ensemble consists of Veekkan chenda, Uruttu chenda (both drums), Elathaalam (cymbals), Kombu and Kuzhal (both, wind instruments).

== Aarattu ==
Arattu is celebrated in the last week of the month of Vruschika. its starts on 24 of Vrischikam and ends on Dhanu 1st. On the seventh day of Kodiyeram, Manakattamma goes out to the temple pool of Sri Arayakulangara Sri Krishna Swamy and hoists the flag on return. In the past, the poojas were performed by the Brahmins of the Kochur Math, but now it is performed by the Tantri of the Thazhaman Math, who holds thanthra of the Manakattu Devi Temple.

=== Sajeev Sadasivan ===
Sajeev is the unchanging nouveau riche of Muttam Nadu where Manakattu temple is the deity by his good character. Born on Manakattu temple's Aarattu day.He loved his mother and Manakkattu amma more than his life until he departs at the age of 35. He died in 2016, on an Aarattu day. Sajeev, who worked hard from an early age, had a degree in Biology Science and a Diploma in Instrumentation. During the time when his own father and elder brother were expatriates, he stayed at home and raised cattle for the sole reason that he could not leave his mother alone, even though he had many good job Offers. He was a brother, a Son, a guide for the whole people in Muttom area. Sajeev is still a pain for us. His memories will live with for forever.

== Gallery ==
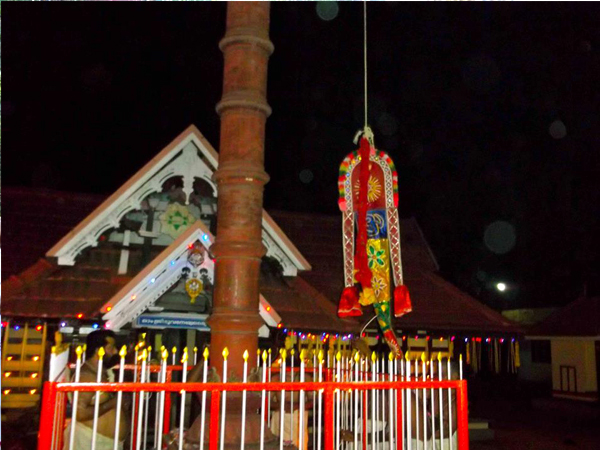
Kodiyettu

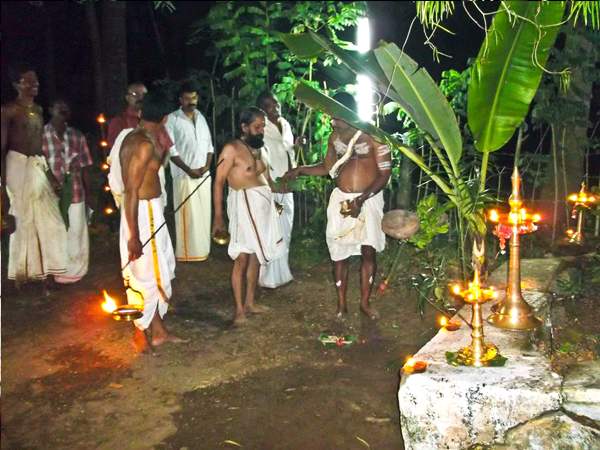
Pallivetta

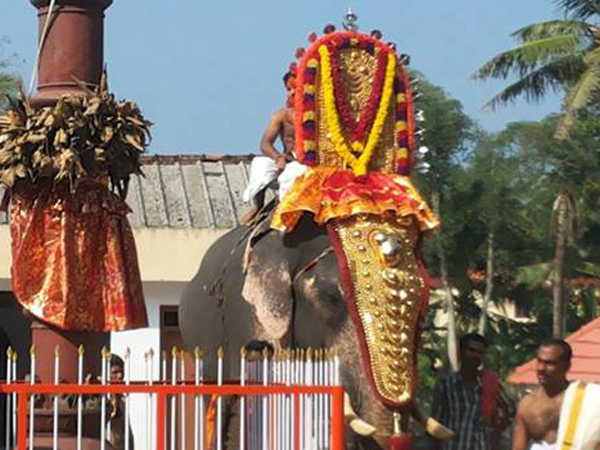
Aarattu

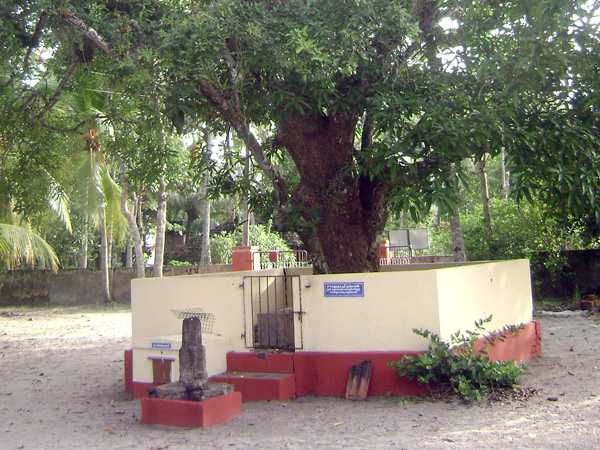
Valyachan

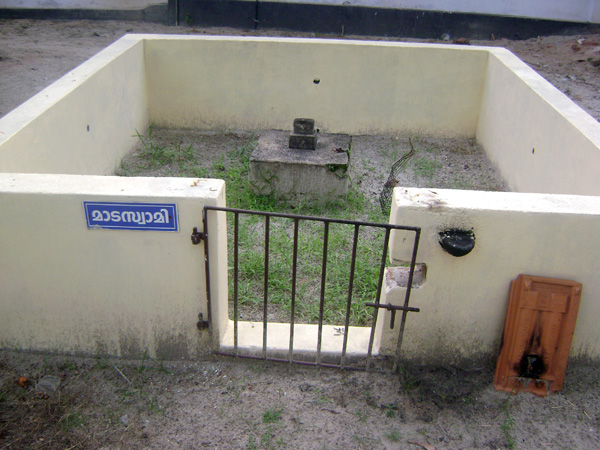
Maadaswami

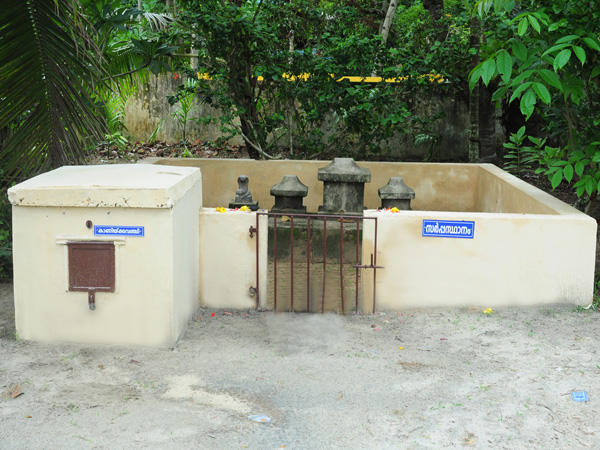
Naagaraaja

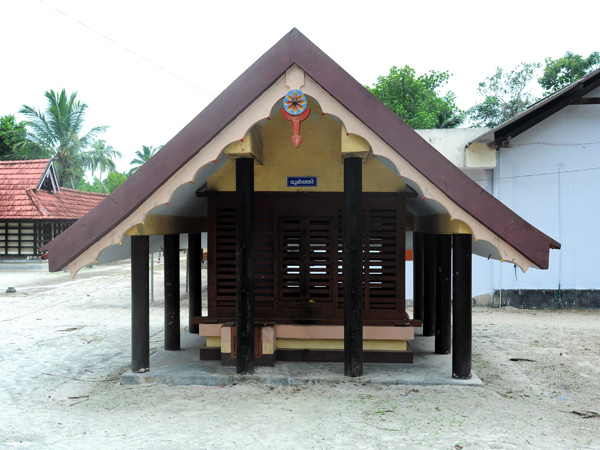
Moorthi Temple

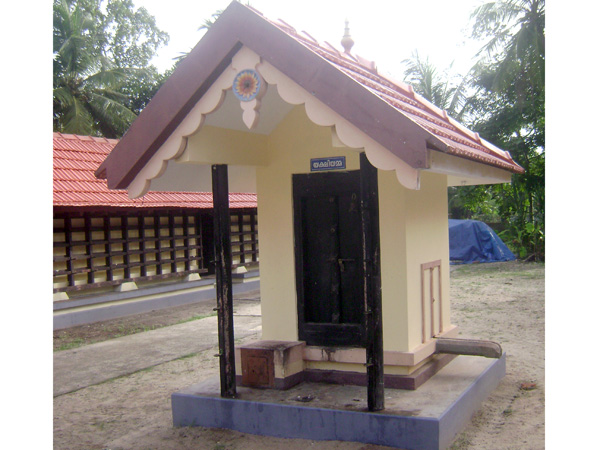
Yakshiamma

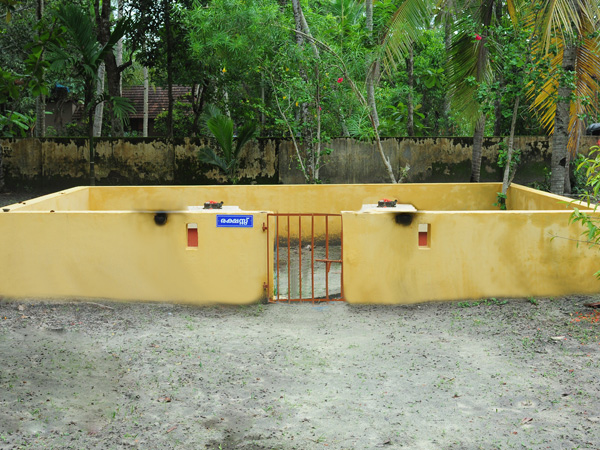
Rekshasu

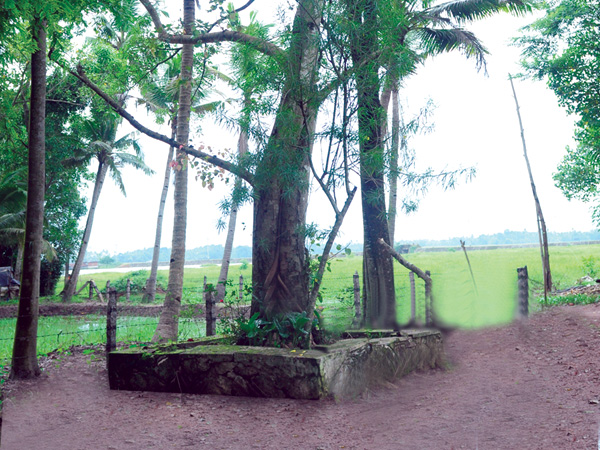
Pallivetta Aalthara

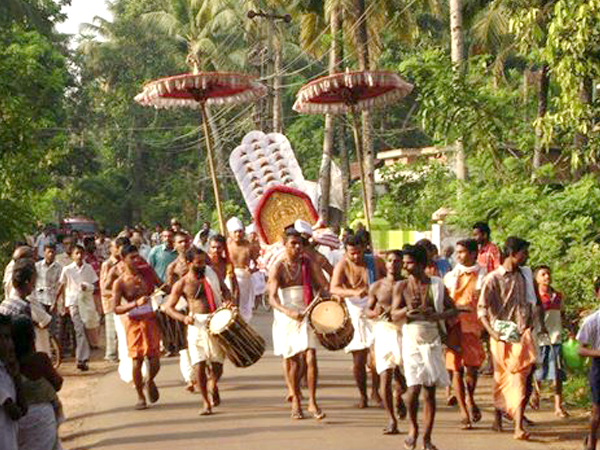
Manakkattu Bhagavathippara

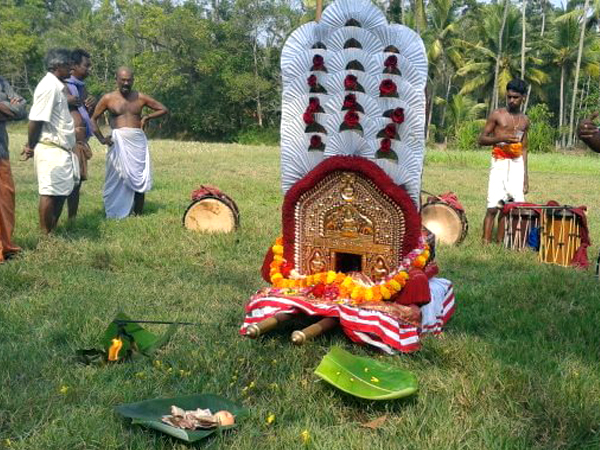
Bhagavathippara

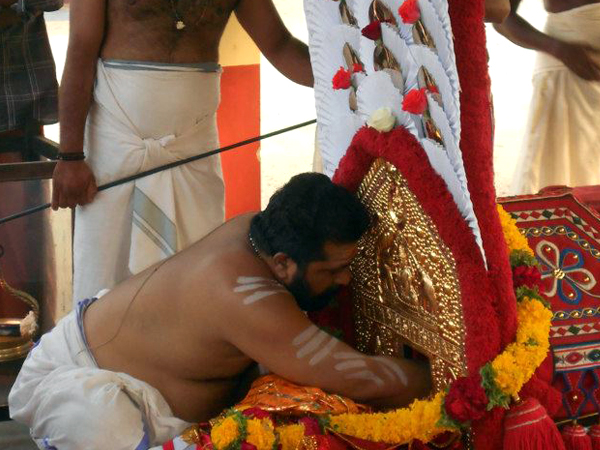
Bhagavathippara

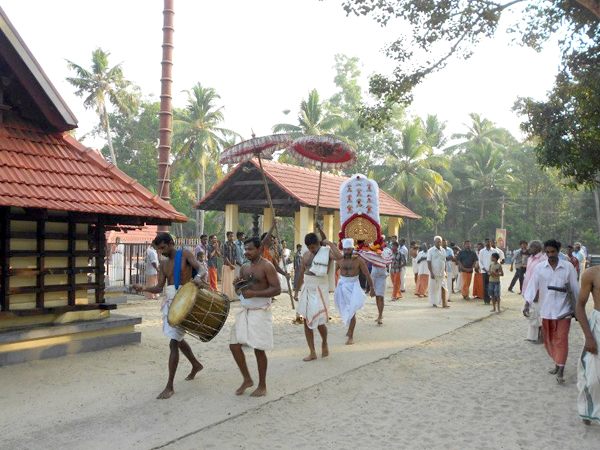
Bhagavathippara

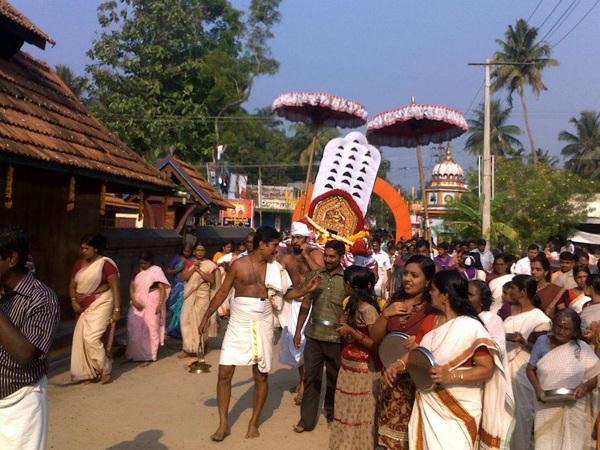
Bhagavathippara

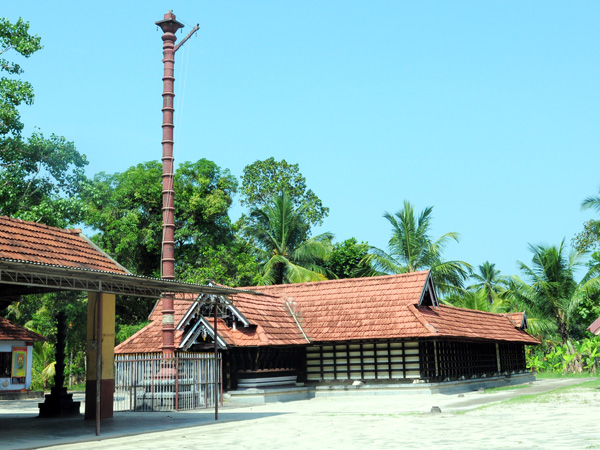
Temple

== See also ==
- Temples of Kerala
- Temple festivals of Kerala
