= Pallithanam Luca Matthai =

Pallithanam Luca Matthai (also known as Pallithanathu Mathaichan) was born in 1880 in Kainady village, Kuttanad, British India.

His father, Mathai Luca Pallithanam, was among the pioneers of kayal cultivation (reclamation of cultivable land from the Vembanad Lake) in Kuttandu. The family estate passed to 18-year-old Luca Matthai on the death of his father.

Matthai spearheaded the reclamation activities of more than one-third of the total Kayal Nilam's (Kayal Nilam refers to the cultivable land reclaimed from the Vemaband Lake). His first venture of kayal cultivation was the reclamation of Cherukara Kayal.

During 1898–1904, he reclaimed the Pallithanam Moovayiram Kayal and Madathil Kayal but could not progress further because of a ban on reclamation imposed by the Travancore Raja in 1904. That ban was removed in 1914, after which Matthai and some other prominent families in Kuttanadu, reclaimed E-Block Kayal, which covered 2,400 acres (970 ha). This is the biggest kayal nilam in Kuttanadu. H Block Kayal (1917) and R Block Kayal (1921) were his other major reclamations.

Matthai served as member of the Moolam Thirunal of Travancore's Praja Sabha (Popular Assembly) and is considered to be a pioneer of the cooperative agricultural movement in Kuttanadu. His life marked the beginning of the epoch of first generation Kayal Raja's of Kuttanad.(Kayal Raja is the term generally used to refer to the prominent kayal cultivators in the Kuttanadu region).

In 1931, in order to strengthen the farming community in Kuttanadu, he founded Kuttanadu Karshaka Sangham. He spearheaded the debt relief struggle that resulted in the enactment of the Agricultural Debt Relief Act.

Our Lady of Dolours Church in Kainady village stands on land donated by him. Using his influence as a member of the Praja Sabha, he established a primary school in Kainady in 1921 and in the initial years he acted as the manager of it. This school was later named as A J John Memorial High School. Matthai was among the founders of the All-Kerala Catholic Congress.

He died on Christmas Day, 1962.
