= I. C. Chacko =

Indian geologist and philologist

Illiparambil Corah Chacko (1875–1966) was a geologist, philologist, writer and grammarian of Kerala, India.

He was born at Pulinkunnu in Kuttanad of Alappuzha District, Kerala. After graduation from His Highness Maharajas College in Trivandrum, he went to London, and studied physics mathematics and geology in the Imperial College of Science and Technology, University of London. He became an associate of the Royal School of Mines. He was the state geologist of Travancore State and the director of industries.

He was a writer in English, Malayalam Sanskrit and geological articles as well. He was the second recipient of the Kenthra Sahitya Academy Award (instituted in 1955), which he was conferred in 1956 for his work 'Paananeeya Pradyotam' a commentary in Malayalam on Panini's Vyakarana Sutras containing Sutrapatha, Dhathupatha, Ganapatha, Indices of Roots & Terminations and Alphabetical Index. He also wrote Christhu sahasra namam (Kristhu sahasra namam) in 1914. The Kerala Sahitya Academy also has an Endowment Award in his name.
