= Narakattaramukku =

- village
- Country: India
- State: Kerala
- District: Alappuzha

Languages
  - Official: Malayalam, English
- Time zone: UTC+5:30 (IST)
- Vehicle registration: KL-

Narakattaramukku is a nearby place of Neerattupuram. It is situated on Neerattupuram - Muttar - Alappuzha road in the Upper Kuttanad area and on the banks of Pampa River.
