= Thalavady =

- village
- Location in Kerala, India Thalavady (India)
- Coordinates: 9°21′0″N 76°32′0″E
- Country: India
- State: Kerala
- District: Alappuzha

Languages
  - Official: Malayalam, English
- Time zone: UTC+5:30 (IST)
- PIN: 689572
- Vehicle registration: KL-
- Nearest city: Alappuzha
- Lok Sabha constituency: Mavelikkara

Thalavady is an Upper Kuttanadu village and Panchayat located in Kuttanadu Taluk, Alappuzha district, Kerala, India. The village was ruled by King of Chembakassery Kingdom. Its geography is dominated by its vast lush green paddy field, unique to Kuttanad villages, bordered by a network of canals running between the fields and the Pampa River that flows through the village. Thalavady panchayat office is located in Trikkayil.

Thalavady is the site of several famous temples and churches. Chakkulathukavu Temple on the banks of Pampa river in Thalavady is one of Kerala's most popular pilgrim centres. Kuzheeppally (jointly owned by Thalavady Padinjarekkara Marthoma Church and St.Thomas Orthodox Church, Thalavady) is one of the major churches in Thalavady. 25-year-old Pamba Boat race is held at Neerattupuram on the day of Uthradam.

A book describing the village in detail was published in 1982, based on a socio-economic study conducted in 1971.

== Etymology ==
Prior to 1750, it was ruled by Chempakassery Kingdom and the capital was Ambalapuzha. Chempakassery Kings had a summer palace at Thalavady. The distance between Thalavady and Ambalapuzha was about 17 kilometers. At that time there was no roadways connecting Ambalapuzha and Thalavady. Travel was possible only through waterways. The Royal party had to move between these two places frequently. Whenever the Royal entourage start from Thalavady, a ceremonial cracker will be set off. This is a message to the people to clear off the canal through which the entourage is coming. The first cracker was fired at Thalavady. The word 'Thalavedy' means first cracker. It is believed that the present name was derived from 'Thalavedi'.

== Transportation ==
Distance from Thalavady:

1.Cochin International Airport- 111 km 2.Trivandrum International Airport- 134 km 3.Tiruvalla railway station - 12.2 km 4. Ambalappuzha railway station - 16.5 km 5. Kerala State Road Transport Corporation (KSRTC) operates bus service from Thiruvalla and Edathua.

== Government ==
Thalavady is designated number 11 of the 13 self-governed segments in the Kuttanad Assembly constituency. It has an elected Local Self Government standing committee, with one member elected for each of its 15 wards.

== Important places ==
- Vyasapuram
- Narakattaramukku
- Manattara
- Trikkayil
- Anaprambal
- Vellakkinar
- Shappupadi
- Parethodu

== Educational Institutions ==
- St.Thomas English Medium Higher Secondary School, Neerattupuram
- Titus Mar Thoma High School, Neerattupuram
- M.T.L.P.S, Neerattupuram
- Anaprampal North M.T.L.P, Neerattupuram
- Government Vocational Higher Secondary School, Thalavady
- Government Model U.P School, Thalavady
- Anaprampal Devaswom Upper Primary School, Thalavady
- CMS High School, Kunthirikkal Thalavady
