= Kumarankary =

Coordinates: 9.4596494°N 76.4985867°E

- Village
- Interactive map of Kumarankary
- Country: India
- State: Kerala
- District: Alappuzha

Population (2001)
  - Total: 51,960

Languages
  - Official: Malayalam
- Time zone: UTC+5:30 (IST)
- PIN: 686103
- Telephone code: 0477
- Coastline: 0 kilometres (0 mi)
- Climate: Tropical monsoon (Köppen)
- Avg. summer temperature: 35 °C (95 °F)
- Avg. winter temperature: 20 °C (68 °F)

Kumarankary is a village in Kuttanad, Alappuzha district, Kerala, India. It borders Kottayam and Alappuzha districts.

== Administration ==
Kumarankary is spread over Kottayam and Alappuzha districts but it is considered to be a part of Alappuzha district. It is spread in 2 wards(WARD 3&4) of Veliyanadu Grama Panchayat in Veliyanad Block Panchayat(Alappuzha district) and ward number 21 of Vazhappally Grama Panchayat in Madappally Block Panchayat(Kottayam district).

== Location ==
Kumarankary village is located 5.5 km to the west of Changanacherry, a Historic town of Central Travancore and 4 km North of Alappuzha-Changanacherry road. a population of about 600.

== Points of interest ==
- Kumarankary Sri Dharma Sastha Temple
- St Mary Church

== Transportation ==
Until recently, the only transportation available to reach Kumarankary is the boat operated by water Transport Department from Changanacherry which disembarks at the Kumaramkary Ambalam (temple) Jetty. Present development of road networks from Changanacherry and Kottayam town made the travel to the village easier. Now there is regularly scheduled bus service from Changanassaery KSRTC depot to Kumarankary.
