= Kavalam Chundan =

Kavalam Chundan is a snake boat that belongs to Kavalam village. This snake boat was formerly known as Kainakary Puthan Chundan.

It was later purchased by Mr Kochupurackal Ouseph Thomman in 1942. In 1943 it was rebuilt and named Kavalam Chundan; after the death of Ouseph Thomman, his son Mr Thomman Joseph took over ownership. This boat won the Nehru Trophy Boat Race for backwater racing in 1949, 1950, 1958, 1960 and 1962. There is also a Malayalam movie based on its story.
