= Anaprambal =

- sub division of thalavady grama panchayath
- Interactive map of Anaprambal
- Country: India
- State: Kerala
- District: Alappuzha

Languages
  - Official: Malayalam, English
- Time zone: UTC+5:30 (IST)
- Vehicle registration: KL-

Anaprambal is a sub division of Thalavady village. It is situated on Thiruvalla - Takazhi - Ambalappuzha road in the Kuttanad area and on the banks of Pampa River. The Sree Dharmasastha Temple is situated here.
