= Trikkayil =

Village in Alappuzha District, Kerala, India

Trikkayil is a village in Alappuzha district, Kerala, India near Neerattupuram. It is situated on the Neerattupuram-Takazhi-Alappuzha road. The place is home to the Thalavady Panchayat office and the famous Sree Krishna Temple. It is an Upper Kuttanad area and the bank of Pampa River.
