= Kainady =

- Village
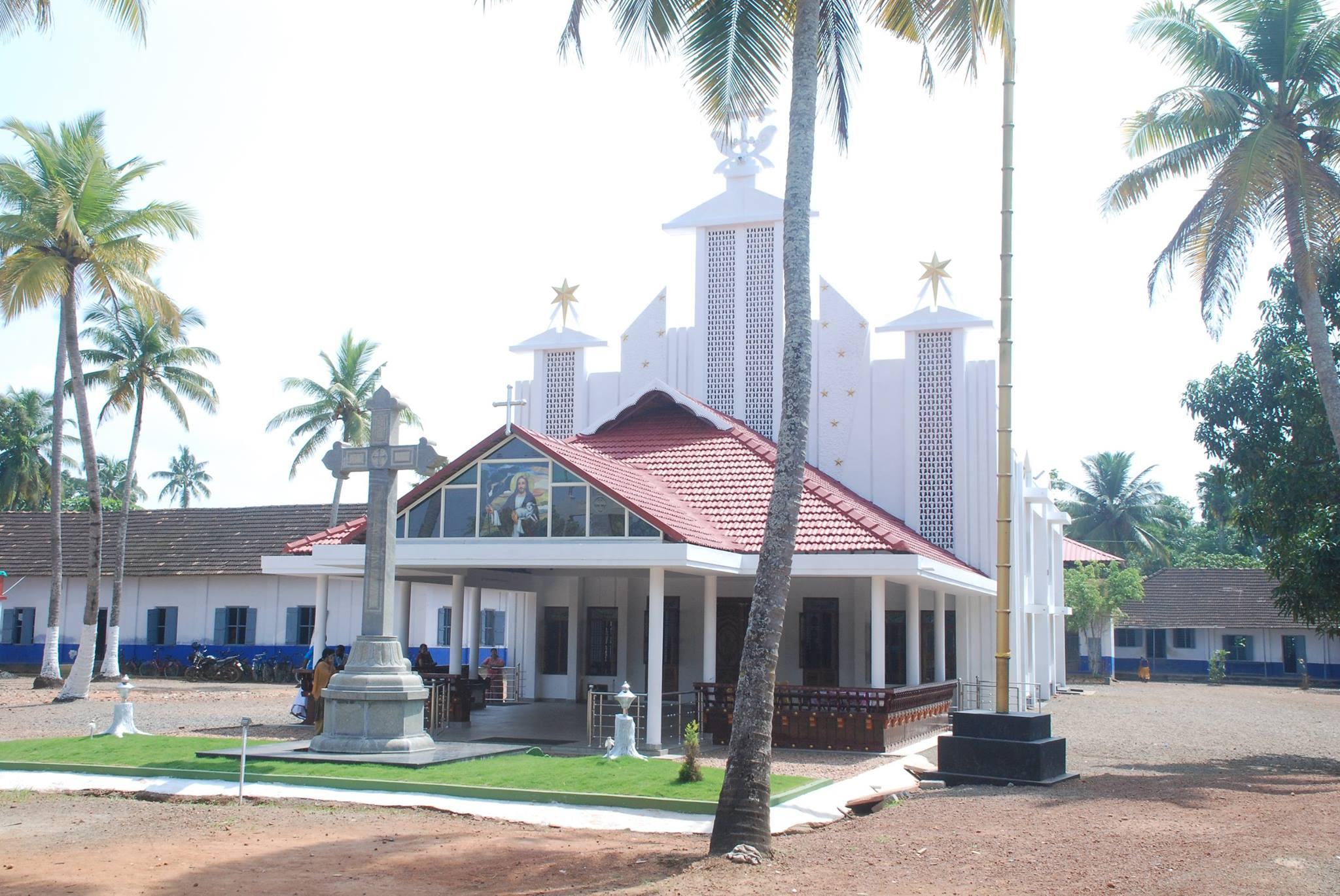
- Interactive map of Kainady
- Country: India
- State: Kerala
- District: Alappuzha
- Taluk: Kuttanad

Government
  - Type: Panchayat
  - Body: Neelamperoor Panchayat

Kainady is a village located in Neelamperoor panchayat in Alappuzha district of Kerala, India.

== Geography ==
Kainady is a small island that consists of paddy fields and small canals. The population consists of Hindu and Christian communities. Our Lady of Dolours Church and Karumathra Temple are two main places of worship in Kainady.

== Notable people ==
Kainady is the birthplace of Pallithanam Luca Matthai (popularly known as Pallithanathu Mathaichan) who was the member of Sree Moolam Popular Assembly during the 1920s. He pioneered the backwater paddy cultivation in Kuttanadu. In 1900 he reclaimed Cherukara Kayal and Pallithanam Kayal from the Vembanad Kayal for paddy cultivation. He is considered as the father of cooperative agricultural movement in Kuttanadu. He spearheaded the debt relief struggle and was instrumental in the enactment of Agricultural Debt Relief Act, that emancipated the illfated agriculture families from the debt trap. He was the founder of Kuttanadu Karshaka Sangham, which was considered as the voice of Kuttanad's farmers.

Eapen Kandakudy, son of Shri Jacob Kandakudy was born on 25 November 1944. He was member of 5th Kerala legislative assembly. He was the chairman of MILMA in 1980. Moreover, he actively participated in the struggle for the swift implementation of the Thanneermukkam Bund Project.

The botanist Joseph Pallithanam was born in Kainady.

Social activist Thomas Pallithanam is also from Kainady

== History ==
In 1921, under the influence of the then member of Sree Moolam Popular Assembly, Pallithanam Luca Matthai Kainady church obtained a permission from the Travancore King to establish St. Mary's School which is the main educational institution in Kainady. In 1960, this school was renamed as A.J John Memorial School in honour of the eminent Catholic leader and Chief minister A. J. John, Anaparambil.

== Nature ==
Kainady is a very scenic place of Kerala amidst the back water paddy fields but blessed in many ways with water and road transports. This village is very much at the brink of Kuttandan Kayals but is very close and connected to Kottayam and Changanacherry towns.
