= Koduppunna =

- village
- koduppunna is located in Kerala Koduppunna (India)
- Coordinates: 9°26′20″N 76°25′15″E
- Country: India
- State: Kerala
- District: Alappuzha

Languages
  - Official: Malayalam, English
- Time zone: UTC+5:30 (IST)
- Vehicle registration: KL-66

Koduppunna is a small village in kuttanad region of Alappuzha district in Kerala. It lies 2 km away from the Alappuzha- Changanacherry road. It is a part of Edathua Panchayath.

== How to reach ==
Koduppunna can be easily accessed by road. The nearest towns are Changanacherry and Edathua. The Kerala State Road Transport Corporation (KSRTC) Runs 28 bus services daily through this village. Nearest bus stations are Changanacherry(11 km) and Edathua (7 km). Major nearby towns are Alappuzha (21 km), Kottayam (31 km) Mavelikkara (27 km) Thiruvalla (23 km) and Harippad (20 km). It is also well connected with waterways. Nearby villages are Puthukkary, oorukkary, Mithrakary, Thayamkary, Ramankary, Champakulam and Edathua.

== Place of Worship ==
=== Temples ===
- Major Koduppunnakavu Devi Temple, Koduppunna
- Palathitta Kalarickal Temple, Koduppunna
- Pazhudi padanilam Temple, Koduppunna
- Venkida Temple
- Paroor Temple

=== Churches ===
- St Joseph's Church, Koduppunna
- St Jude's Shrine, Koduppunna

== Education Institutions ==
- Government HSS, Koduppunna
- Vijayamatha Public School, Koduppunna

== Notable people ==
Kodupunna Govinda Ganakan
