= Joseph Murickan =

Indian farmer (1900–1974)

- Born: 1900; Kavalam, Travancore, British India
- Died: December 9, 1974 (aged 73–74); Thiruvananthapuram, Kerala
- Other name: Murickan Auta or Murikkum Moottil Authachen
- Occupation: Farmer
- Known for: Paddy cultivation in Kuttanad
- Spouse: Eliyamma
- Children: 9

Joseph Murickan also known as Murickan Auta or Murikkum Moottil Authaman was a farmer and landowner from Kerala, India, who played an important role in the expansion of paddy cultivation in Kuttanad. He started farming by filling up the backwaters of Kuttanad. He is popularly referred as Kayal Raja literally meaning 'King of Lake'.

== Biography ==
Joseph Murickan also known as Murickan Auta or Murikkum Moottil Authaman was born in 1900, in Kavalam in present-day Alappuzha district of Kerala. His father, Thomman Luka, came to Kavalam in search of a fertile farmland from Azhikkal house in Kulasekharamangalam near Vaikom in present-day Kottayam district.

=== Personal life and death ===
Murickan was survived by his wife, Eliyamma of Veliyanad Puthanpura Panchara. They have nine children: eight boys and one girl. Murikan died at the age of 74 at Thiruvananthapuram Medical College Hospital on December 9, 1974. He was buried at Palayam Saint Mary Church Cemetery.

== Contributions ==
=== Paddy cultivation ===
During the famine in Travancore after the Second World War, Travancore king Chithira Thirunal ordered more land to be cultivated. The king had only said that the land could be exempted from tax for five years.

Murickan suggested that paddy could be grown in the lake. The locals joked that Murickan was crazy that he could grow paddy in the lake. Regardless of that, he studied the nature of the lake with the help of experts. Realizing that there were shallow parts in the lake, he dug a ridge with mud and pumped out the water. The soil at the bottom was made usable. Thus, in 1940, for the first time, paddy was grown in the backwaters where there was no paddy. Murikkan showed his sincerity to the royal family by naming the fields created by him as Chithira (900 acres), Marthandam (652 acres) and Rani (600 acres). In 1954, farmers' struggle was waged against Muricken, the then largest landlord in Kuttanad. Following the Land Reforms Act passed by the Kerala Legislative Assembly, in 1972, when C. Achutha Menon was the Chief Minister, the Government acquired these lands from the Murikan family. In 1975, the government distributed 1600 acres of land acquired from the Murickan family to 1580 farmers.

=== Churches ===
Chithira church, the first Christian shrine in Kuttanad was built by Murickan. In addition to Chithira Church, Murickan who was a devout Catholic, built six large churches and a small church in Malabar and Thiruvananthapuram region.

=== Freshwater pond ===
Due to the salt water in the lake, he himself took the initiative to get freshwater for the thousands of workers who were working for him and dug a 10-acre pond near the Chithira Church. He implemented a natural purification system in the pond. In addition to the workers, water was also provided to those from nearby areas.

== Honors ==
Joseph Murikkan was honored by the Food and Agriculture Organization (FAO) of the United Nations. His successful efforts to cultivate land below sea level have been praised internationally.

== Controversies ==
In the ICSE Class VII Malayalam textbook, a chapter was about the life of Murickan. The chapter 'Joseph Murickan' was from the autobiography of journalist T. J. S. George. CPI (M) demanded that the chapter be withdrawn on the grounds that it mocks Land Reforms Act of Kerala. Former Kerala chief minister V. S. Achuthanandan said that praising the feudal landlord and mocking land reform is an insult to history. George strongly denied the allegations, saying he did not mock land reform or glorify feudalism.
