= Nedumudi =

- Village
- Interactive map of Nedumudi
- Coordinates: 9.442871°N 76.40399°E
- Country: India
- State: Kerala
- District: Alappuzha
- Elevation: .75 m (2.5 ft)

Population (2011)
  - Total: 14,601

Languages
  - Official: Malayalam, English
- Time zone: UTC+5:30 (IST)
- PIN: 688508
- Telephone code: 0477
- Nearest city: Alappuzha
- Sex ratio: 1065/1000 ♂/♀
- Literacy: 100%
- Lok Sabha constituency: Mavelikkara
- Vidhan Sabha constituency: Kuttanad

Nedumudi is a village in the Alappuzha district of the Indian state of Kerala. It is the birthplace of Malayalam actor Nedumudi Venu. Nedumudi sits on the banks of the river Pamba. It was the first village in Kerala to attain 100% Literacy.

== Climate ==
Nedumudi is part of the lower Kuttanadu. It experiences a moderate climate; however, in autumn, the Pamba river overflows, causing problems. This flooding makes the soil rich for agriculture, the main economic occupation in Nedumudi. However, in 2010, due to the unexpected climate change, the chance of another agricultural season is becoming impossible.

The main celebration in the village is the annual festival of the Sree Bhagavathy temple, Kottaram. It is situated in Attuvathala. The festival is conducted by the four karas (sub divisions) of Nedumudi and the temple Devaswom.

== Demographics ==
According to the 2011 Census of India, Nedumudi had a population of 14,601 with 7,049 males and 7,552 females. The Nedumudi village is geographically divided into 4 sectors namely,

1. Attuvathala
2. Thottuvathala
3. Thekkemuri
4. Ponga
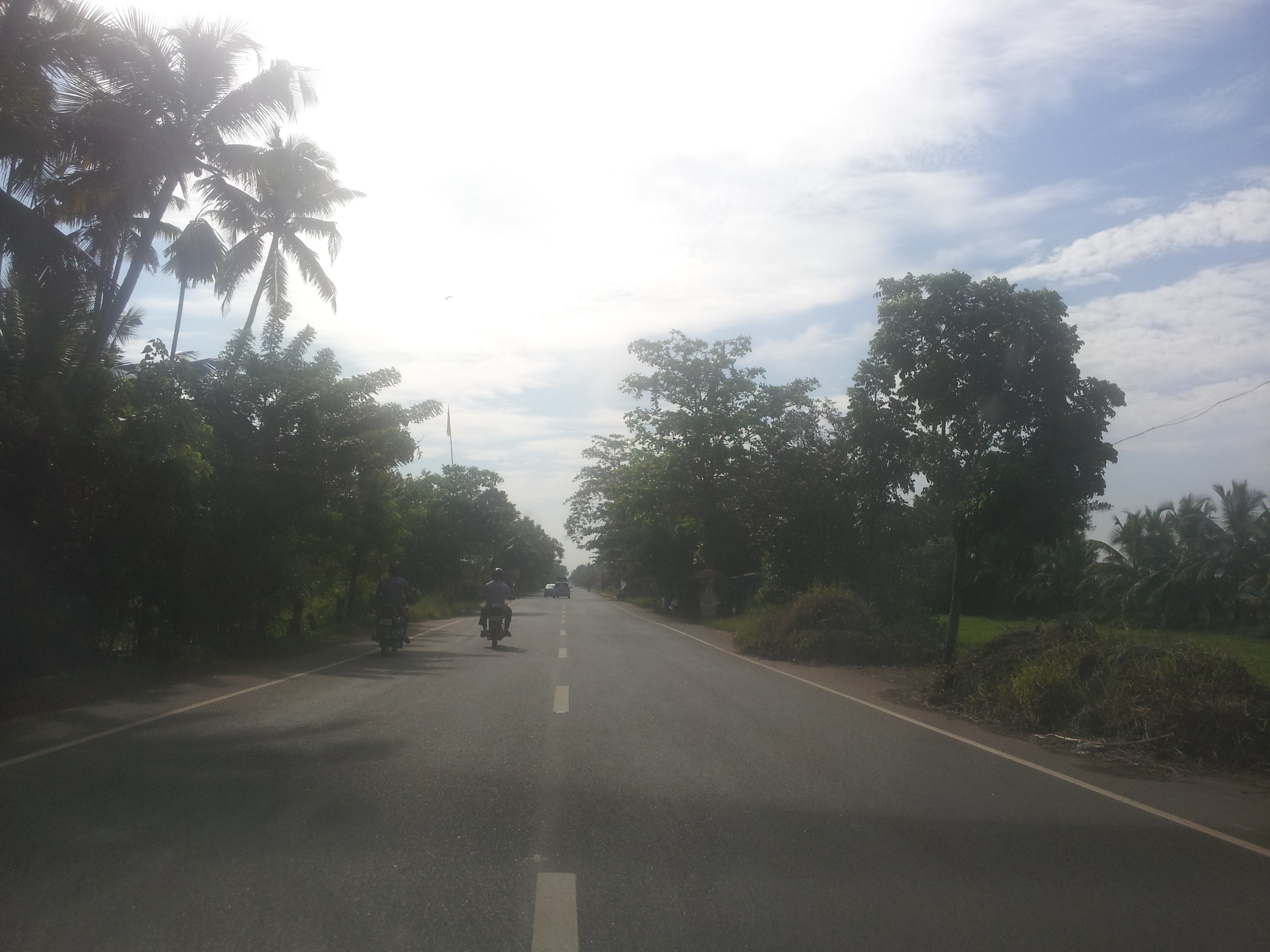
AC Road, Nedumudi

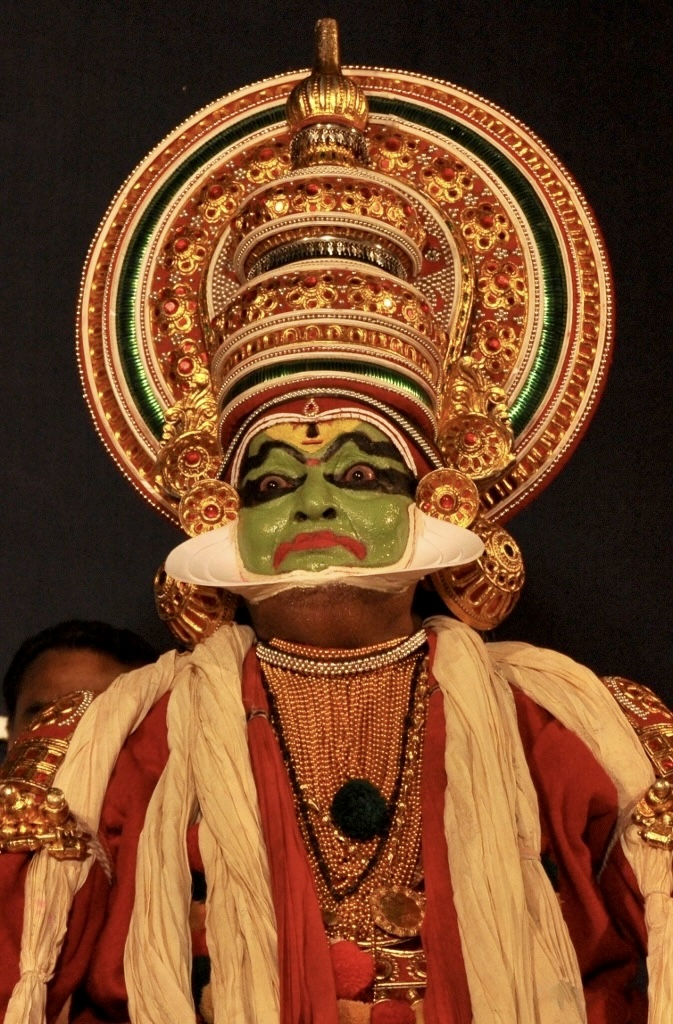
Karnan in Kathakali at Nedumudi

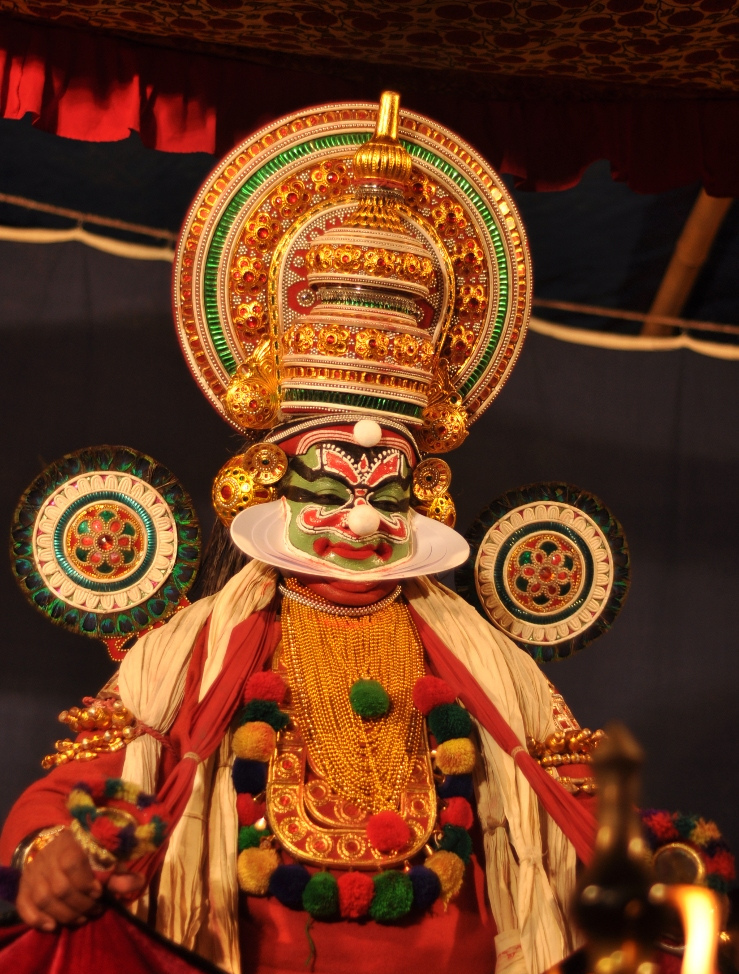
Duryodhanan in Kathakali at Nedumudi
