= Upper Kuttanad =

Region in Kuttanad, India

Upper Kuttanad is a part of India's Kuttanad region. It consists of parts of Kottayam, Pathanamthitta, and Alapuzha districts.

Kuttanad is broadly divided into Lower Kuttanad (Taluks of Ambalapuzha and Kuttanad in Alappuzha district), Upper Kuttanad (some parts of Kuttanad, and Karthikapally Taluks in Alappuzha district, western parts of Tiruvalla taluk in Pathanamthitta district), and North Kuttanad (Taluks of Vaikom, and western parts of Changanacherry and Kottayam taluks in Kottayam district.)

Some villages in Upper Kuttanad are Edathua, Thalavady, Muttar, Veeyapuram, Peringara, chathenkary, Nedumbram, Niranam, Kadapra, Parumala, Mannar and Pallippad.

There is a demand for an Upper Kuttanad taluk (administrative subdivision) with Edathua as headquarters.

Many villages in the Upper Kuttanad region in the upper reaches of Pampa, are frequently affected by heavy rains and floods in 2019.

In 2024, the wetlands of Upper Kuttanad, saw an invasive plant, Malayan Hanguana, spread throughout the backwater areas of Kumarakom panchayat.
