= Mithrakary =

- village
- Location in Kerala, India Mithrakary (India)
- Coordinates: 9°24′45″N 76°28′25″E
- Country: India
- State: Kerala
- District: Alappuzha

Languages
  - Official: Malayalam, English
- Time zone: UTC+5:30 (IST)
- Postal code: 689598
- Vehicle registration: KL-66
- Coastline: 0 kilometres (0 mi)
- Climate: Tropical monsoon (Köppen)
- Avg. summer temperature: 35 °C (95 °F)
- Avg. winter temperature: 20 °C (68 °F)

Mithrakary is a small village in Kerala, India. It is located in Muttar Panchayat in Kuttanadu Taluk. It is presumed that this region (most part of Kuttanad) was a very big forest in ancient years, but later destroyed by a forest fire. It is still possible to see "kari" (coal) if we dig deep into the soil. So this place name end-up with Kari. This village was the property of a well-known Brahmin family named 'Mithra Madom' in early days. The Brahmin family name 'Mithra' and the concept of the land arise from 'Karies' joined to form the name of this village - 'Mithra' 'Kari'. Another and more reliable storey behind the name is that in ancient era, this village was under the control of 'Mithran' - the village ruler. From his name this village got its name.

This village is famous for its ancient temple 'Mithrakary Devi Temple'. The famous peculiarity of this temple is that it has two idols of same goddess at its srikovil.

Mithrakary Devi Temple is famous for "Garudan Thookkam" Garudan Thookkam, literally means hanging garuda (Eagle god).

Major Christian churches are St Xaviers Church (built by Fr. Philipose Chemputhara in 1887) and Holy Family Church (built on 1896 as a sub parish of St. Xaviers, Puthukkary), both under the Archdiocese of Changanassery.

St. Xavier's High School, stated by Rev. Fr. Philip Olassayil in 1949 under the auspices of the Carmelite Convent, enlightened young minds of Mithrakary and its neighbouring villages from its early days, when transportation facilities were limited. The foundation stone was blessed by Servant of God Mar Mathew Kavukattu, the then Archbishop of Changanassery Diocese. Now it is an English Medium school with modern computer education and excellent academic record.

This village is famous for its traditional clay pots called "Mithrakary Chatties"

Mithrakary was celebrated boat race during 1970s – 1990s in Mithrakary River and the major churullan boats were Kalariparampan, Thuruthumali, Kuruppanthara etc.

Nearby villages are Puthukkary, Muttar, Kalangara, Koduppunna, Mampuzhakary, Vezhapra, Edathua etc.

Most of the villagers are farmers and mainly depend on Alappuzha and Changanacherry for their day-to-day life

== Divisions ==
A river flowing through the centre of Mithrakary divides it into two:

- West Mithrakary
- East Mithrakary
