= Valadi =

- village
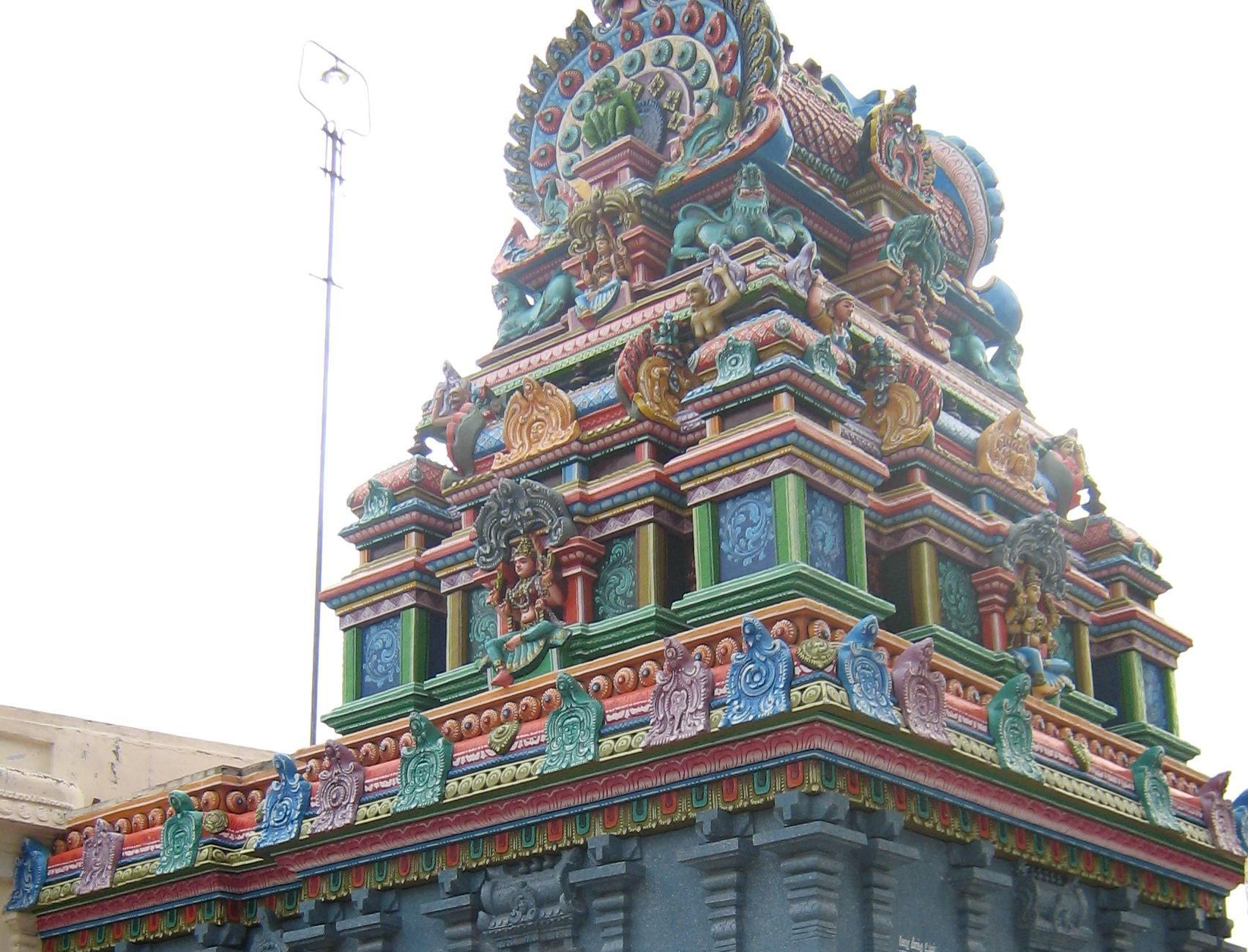
- Ulagayee temple at Valadi

- Location in Tamil Nadu, India
- Coordinates: 10.8763°N 78.7576°E
- Country: India
- State: Tamil Nadu
- District: Tiruchirappalli
- Elevation: 86.86 m (285.0 ft)

Languages
  - Official: Tamil
- Time zone: UTC+5:30 (IST)
- PIN: 621 218
- Telephone code: 0431

Valadi is a zone in Tiruchirappalli city, located on 5 miles from Chathram Bus Terminus in Trichy, Tamil Nadu along the Trichy-Chennai railway.

There is a World War I memorial in Valadi on the Valadi Lalgudi highway.

== Notable people ==
- Lalgudi Jayaraman, musician and composer
- V. Seshasayee, businessman
