= Pallippad =

- Grama Panchayath
- Interactive map of Pallippad
- Country: India
- State: Kerala
- Region: Central Travancore
- District: Alappuzha

Population
  - Total: 24,648

Languages
  - Official: Malayalam,
- Time zone: UTC+5:30 (IST)
- PIN: 690511, 690512
- Vehicle registration: KL-29
- Literacy: 92%
- Lok Sabha constituency: Alappuzha
- Vidhan Sabha constituency: Haripad

Pallippad is a village near Haripad in Alappuzha district in the Indian state of Kerala.Pallipad is the most important area of Upper Kuttanad. The name Pallippad is believed to be derived from Buddhist terminology.The famous River Achankovil Aar passes by Pallippad before it reaches Veeyapuram. The village has abundant water resources, small lakes, and water paths that connect to Alappuzha.

Pallipad is surrounded by religious institutions all around and is famous for its religious harmony. The beauty of Pallipad is the sight of Temples and Christian churches standing tall together.The traditions, culture, and rituals of Pallippad are extensions of the nearby town Haripad. Traditionally, Pallipad was considered the rice bowl of the Kingdom of Travancore.

== History ==
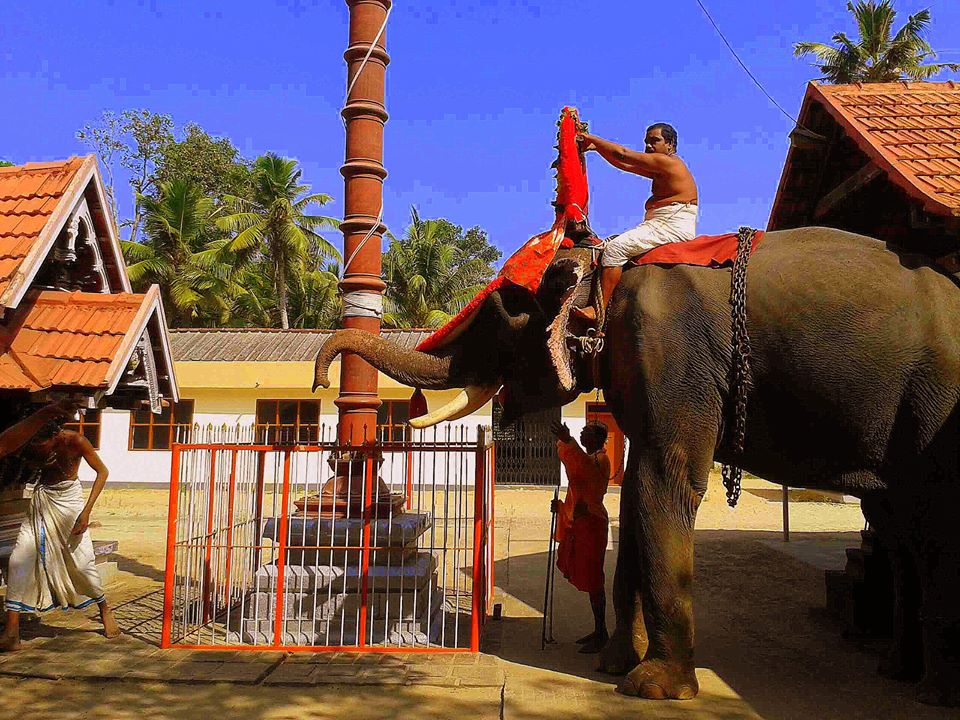
Temple elephant

Pallippad is believed to have been a dense forest before human habitation. Fossil remains were found in the paddy field which justifies this argument.

In 1746, the princely state was defeated by Travancore and its king, Marthanda Varma, on their search for rich paddy fields. The Vettuvelil Yajaman, then Chief Minister of Odanad, settled in Pallippad. After the defeat to Travancore, control of Pallippad went to the Aluva-based Brahmin family Akavoor Mana. Even now, many of the temples in Pallippad are headed by the same Brahmin family and its successors.

== Sites ==
- Mullavakulangara Padanilam: This place is considered one of the most prominent places in Pallippad, where the legendary war between the Chembakashery king and Odanand king of Kayamakulam is said to have taken place.
- Karimpalil Koickal Palace: King Marthanda Varma's guest house (1748) was in Pallippad.
- Gandhiji Smaraka Library: The building was constructed in 1948 after flowers from Gandhiji's Holy remains were put. The Golden Jubilee Memorial building was constructed with the assistance of Raja Rammohun Roy Library Foundation Kolkota, functioning as an A grade Library under The State Library Council.

== Art ==
The murals in the Arayakulangara Sri Krishna Swami temple are believed to have historical importance.

== Demographics ==
As of the 2011 India census, Pallippad had a population of 24,648 with 11,303 males and 13,345 females.

Pallippad Village is part of the Karthikappally Taluk, whose headquarters are situated at Harippad. The Taluk Hospital is also situated in the Pallippad Panchayat limit, where high-quality paddy fields, coconut trees, and river sceneries (Achankovil River) can be spotted. Major schools like Nadevalel school (Naduvattom LPS) and Naduvattam High School are located near the Erattakkulangara temple. Other local schools include [ Konginiyethu L.P. School, Palliyara L.P. School, Anjilimoottil L.P. School (formerly known as Perkattu Pallikudam) and LPS Mullakkara. One of the main college is TKMM Arts College.

Pallippad is the home village of several Hindu temples such as Manakkattu Devi Temple, Neendoor Sreekrishnaswamy Temple, Erattakulangara Devi Temple, Thalathotta Siva temple, Shivamoorthi Temple, Vembolil Shree Bhadrakali Temple, Vazhuthanam Vishnu Temple, Pullambada Devi Temple, Mullakulangara Devi Temple, Arayakulangara Sree Krishnaswami Temple, Chempakasseril Sri Bhagavathy and Nagaraja Swami Temple, and Thalikkal Shiva Temple. Bhagavatha Sapthaham is held yearly in most of the temples. The purpose of Sapthaham is to provide positive energy to the believers by reading the Bhagavatham in seven days. Kuchela Jayanthi and Rukmini Swayamvaram are the most important parts of Sapthaham. Navaho Yagnam is performed in most of the Devi temples every year. Shivarathri Maholsavam is celebrated in Thalikkal Temple and Shivamoorthi Temple. Every year, during Thaipooya, Maholsavam Kavadiyattom goes to Haripad Subramanya Swamy temple from most of the listed temples. These holy temples exist here as a cultural representation of a community. These temples provide believers with complete freedom of belief and worship. They focus on considering the whole world as a single-family and spreading the value of love and life.

== Notable Personalities ==
- Madhu Muttam - screen writer,
