= Mampuzhakkary =

- village
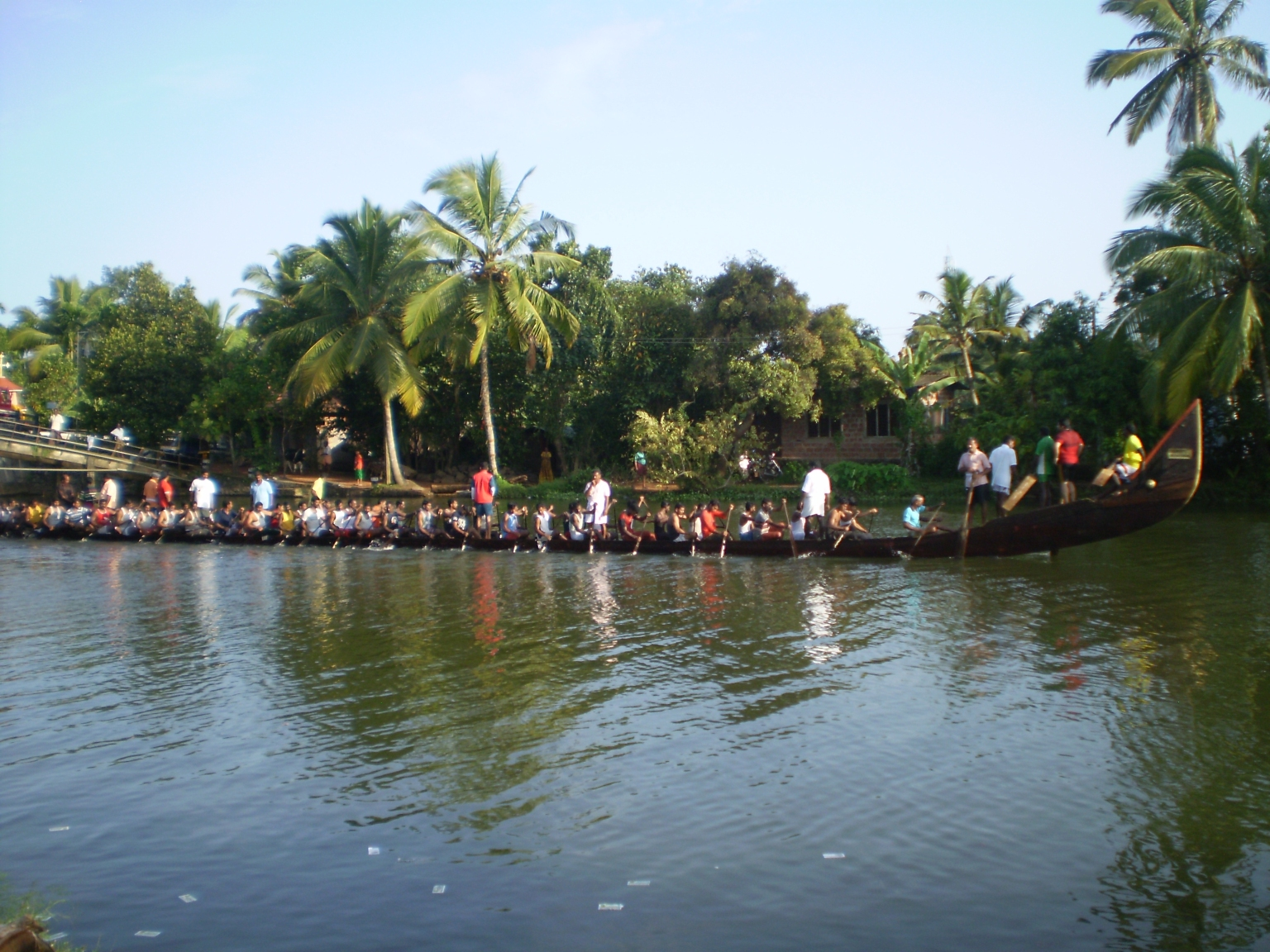
- Trial runs for Nehru Trophy Boat Race 2010

- Location in Kerala, India Mampuzhakkary (India)
- Coordinates: 9°25′0″N 76°28′0″E
- Country: India
- State: Kerala
- District: Alappuzha

Languages
  - Official: Malayalam, English
- Time zone: UTC+5:30 (IST)
- PIN: 689595
- Telephone code: 0477
- Vehicle registration: KL-66
- Nearest city: Changanacherry
- Literacy: 98.8%

Mampuzhakkary is a village in the Kuttanad region of Alappuzha District in South India. It is located near the Pampa River. This village is about 7 km from Changanacherry and 15 km from Alappuzha connected by State Highway 11 (Kerala) or SH11 popularly known as AC road (Alappuzha Changanassery) road.

Agriculture is the major occupation of people in this village. The most commonly grown crop is rice. The backwaters of the area are abundant with fish. There is a primary school, Father Philipose Memorial LP School. There is a hospital, Laxmi Nursing Home (known as Dr. Naveenan's hospital). This village has paddy fields and coconut farms. Agriculture is the major source of income. A local colleges carries out organic farming in Mampuzhakkary.

It has representation at local government level.
