= Muttar =

- village
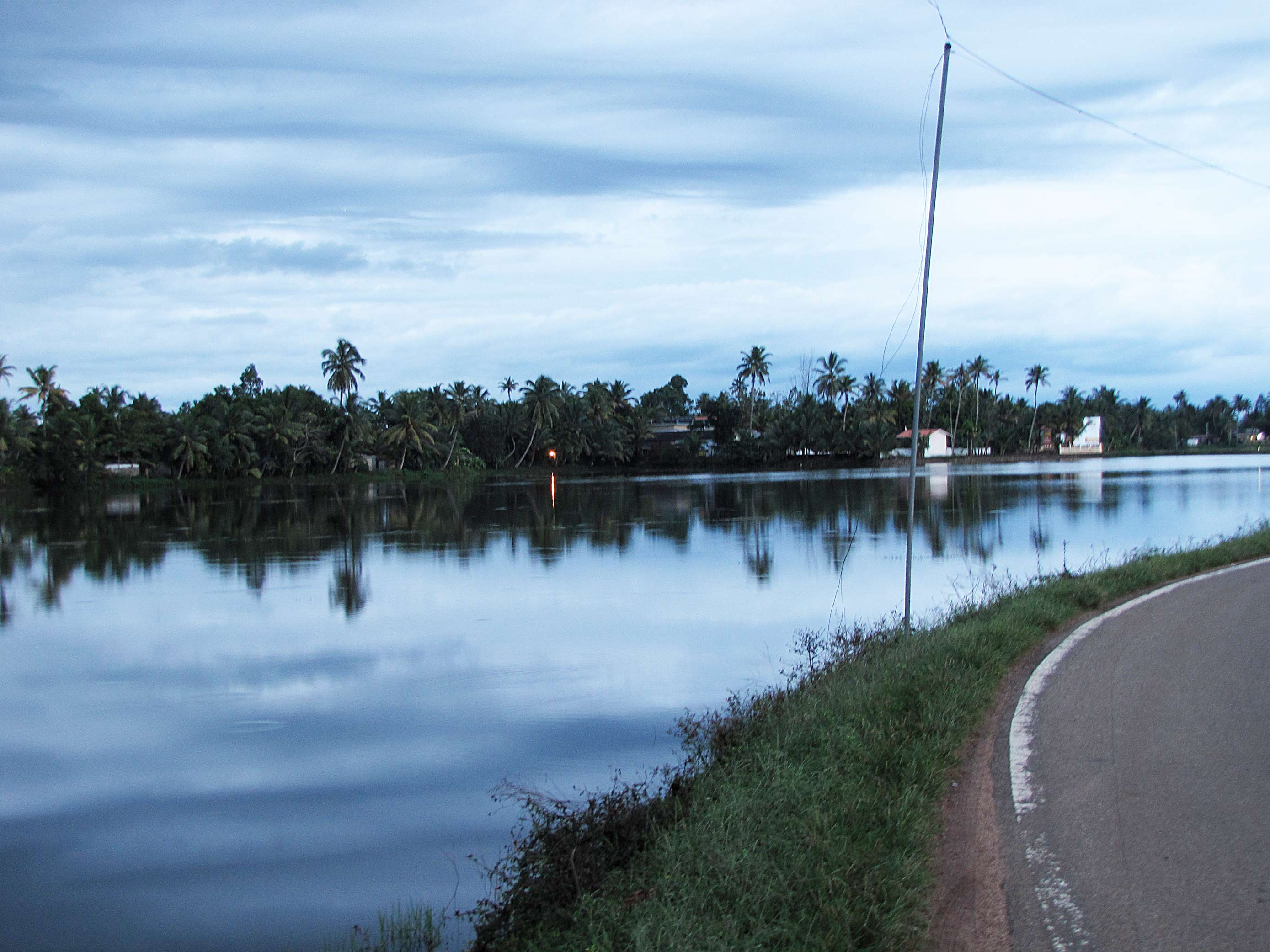
- Muttar village
- Interactive map of Muttar
- Coordinates: 9°26′0″N 76°32′20″E
- Country: India
- State: Kerala
- District: Alappuzha

Population (2011)
  - Total: 9,200

Languages
  - Official: Malayalam, English
- Time zone: UTC+5:30 (IST)
- PINCODE: 689574
- Vehicle registration: KL-04, KL-66
- Nearest town: Changanassery

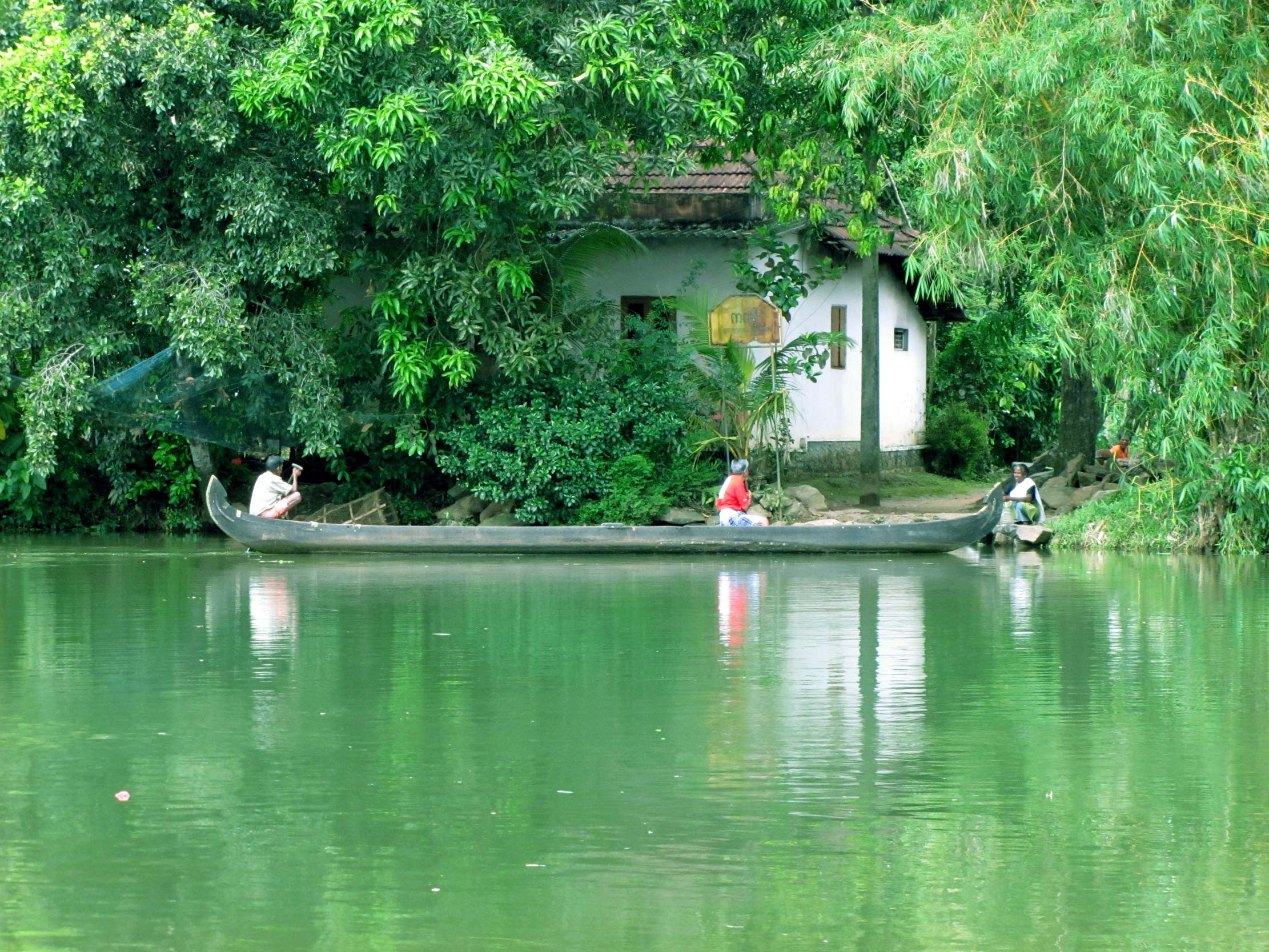
Muttar riverside

Muttar is a village in upper Kuttanad, Alappuzha district of Kerala, India. It is located 10 km west of Thiruvalla on the Kidangara Neerattupuram (Muttar Central) road, surrounded by Thalavady, Neerettupuram, Kunnamkary, Chathamkary & Mithrakary.

== Geography ==
The River Manimala flows on the east of the village. The village has several coconut plantations and paddy fields. Pin Code of Muttar is 689574 which comes under tiruvalla postal division (Kerala Circle) The paddy is cultivated about 5 ft below sea level.

== Places of worship ==
The oldest place of worship in Muttar is the Kochukodungalloor Temple, located on the Northwest side of the village. There is three Nasrani Churches in this small village, The oldest one is St George's Syro-Malabar Church established in 1850 A.D. New church was constructed in 2000 AD . Other Syro-Malabar Churches are St Thomas Church Kumaramchira and Marth Mariam Church Mariyakari(Koventhappalli). There is one Mar Thoma Church as well.

The road through Muttar helps people to reach easily to the religious destination 'Chakulathukavu' Temple.

== Schools ==
The Govt. UP school, and St. George Higher Secondary School, which are more than 75 years old, are the main educational institutes in the village.

A newly started institution in Muttar is the Christ City School (CBSE Curriculum), an institution run by the Carmelites of Mary Immaculate (CMI) Fathers.

St Joseph Mission Hospital is at the heart of the Muttar village.

Muttar was one of the first villages in Alappuzha district to achieve 100% literacy.

== Economy ==
Agriculture is the main revenue source of the village. The main crops are rice, coconut, banana, mango etc. The villagers also engage in fishing as a source of revenue and as entertainment.

== Demographics ==
As per 2011 Indian Census, the population of the village is 9200 out of which 4437 males and 4763 females.
