= Ramankary =

- village
- Location in Kerala, India Ramankary (India)
- Coordinates: 9°25′30″N 76°27′50″E
- Country: India
- State: Kerala
- District: Alappuzha

Languages
  - Official: Malayalam, English
- Time zone: UTC+5:30 (IST)
- PIN: 689595
- Telephone code: 0477
- Vehicle registration: KL-04,KL-66

Ramankary is a village in the Kuttanad region of India. It is located 9 km away from Changanacherry town and 17 km from Alappuzha city. It is one of the villages in Alappuzha on the bank of the Manimala River with picturesque vast paddy fields.

== Geography ==
The villages bordering Ramankary include Veliyanadu on the north, Mampuzhakkary to the east, Manalady to the west and Vezhapra to the south.

== History ==
There is no recorded history on the origin of this land. The oral history among local people, transferred from generation to generation is a blend of myths and legends. There is reference to Kuttanad in the epic Mahabharata of ancient India. During their exile, the five Pandava princes are said to have traveled through this land. In those days, Kuttanad was part of a dense forest, later destroyed by a forest fire which is also mentioned in the epic. Thus came the place name Chuttanad, or the burnt place. In course of time Chuttanad became Kuttanad. One can still see 'kari' or coal deep in the soil of Kuttanad, pointing to the fact that the place was once a forest, destroyed by wildfire. Ramankary is one of the places latter renamed to end with 'kari', the Malayalam word for charcoal.

During the reign of the Chera dynasty that ruled over ancient Kerala, Kuttanad attained an important place in history. One of the powerful kings in the dynasty, Cheran Chenguttavan, is said to have ruled his vast kingdom from Kuttanad, when it was also a famous centre of Buddhism.

Ramankary also has a Dharmashasta (Ayyappa) temple.

== Administration ==
=== Wards ===
Ramankary Grama Panchayat comes under Veliyanad Block Panchayat. It is divided into 13 wards.

- Manalady
- Ramankary North
- Ramankary Town
- Mampuzhakkary West
- Mampuzhakkary Centre
- Mampuzhakkary South
- Oorukkary North
- Puthukkary
- Oorukkary
- Vezhapra East
- Vezhapra Centre
- Vezhapra West

== Demography ==
The Ramankary village had a population of 10755, of whom 5187 were males while 5568 were females as per Population Census 2011. In Ramankary village the population of children aged 0-6 was 1077, which made up 10.01% of the total population of the village. The average sex ratio of Ramankary village is 1073 which is lower than the Kerala state average of 1084. The child sex ratio for Ramankary as per the census is 958, lower than Kthe erala average of 964. Ramankary village has a higher literacy rate compared to Kerala. In 2011, the literacy rate of Ramankary village was 98.02% compared to 94.00% of Kerala. In Ramankary, male literacy stood at 98.25% while female literacy rate was 97.80%. Schedule Caste (SC) constituted 14.80% while Schedule Tribe (ST) were 0.11% of the total population in Ramankary village.

Particulars	Total	Male	Female
Total no. of houses	2,611		
Population	10,755	5,187	5,568
Child (0-6)	1,077	550	527
Schedule Caste	1,592	756	836
Schedule Tribe	12	3	9
Literacy	98.02%	98.25%	97.80%

== Points of interest ==
- Dharmashastha Temple
- District Educational Office of Kuttanadu Educational District
- First Class Judicial Magistrates Court
- Govt. Lower Primary School
- NSS Higher Secondary School
- St Joseph's Church

== Notable people ==
- Nagavally R S Kurup - eriter, film director
- Venu Nagavalli - film actor/director
