= Veeyapuram =

- Village
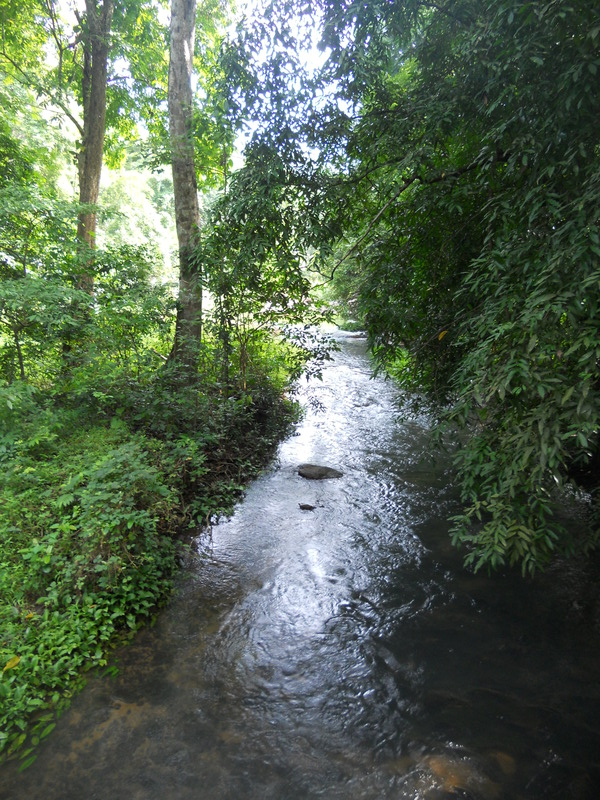
- Achencovil river
- Interactive map of Veeyapuram
- Coordinates: 9°19′0″N 76°28′0″E
- Country: India
- State: Kerala
- District: Alappuzha

Population (2011)
  - Total: 11,392

Languages
  - Official: Malayalam, English
- Time zone: UTC+5:30 (IST)

Veeyapuram is a village in the district of Alappuzha, Kerala, India. It is located about 7 kilometers north of Haripad town.

== Geographics ==
Veeyapuram is surrounded by the Pamba River and Achankovil rivers. This village is under Kuttanad sector and has many paddy fields and streams from both of these rivers. About 15 acre of land belongs to forest department was declared as reserve forest by Kerala forest department in 2013. It is the only forest in Alappuzha District.

== Demographics ==
As of 2011 India census, Veeyapuram had a population of 11392 with 5239 males and 6153 females.

== Specialities ==
Kerala Government Timber Depot. Payippad snake boat race is conducted in this village. The Boat race is a 3-day annual event starting on Thiruvonam day in Chingam month every year. The final race is on the 4th day of Onam (Chadhayam). Star and month mentioned above are as per Malayalam calendar. These days fall on August or September in the Gregorian calendar.
