= Kanjikuzhi (disambiguation) =

Kanjikuzhi is a village in Idukki district of Kerala, Indian.

Kanjikuzhi, or similar, may also refer to the following places in the Indian state of Kerala:

- Kanjikkuzhi, a census town in Kottayam district
- Kanjikuzhi (Alappuzha), a census town and Panchayat in Alappuzha district
- Kanjikuzhy, a village in Idukki, Kottayam, Alapuzha district
