= Kunnumma =

Village in Alappuzha district in the Indian state of Kerala

- village
- Location in Kerala, India Kunnumma (India)
- Coordinates: 9°21′0″N 76°24′0″E
- Country: India
- State: Kerala
- District: Alappuzha

Population (2011)
  - Total: 14,252
- Time zone: UTC+5:30 (IST)

Kunnumma is a village in Alappuzha district in the Indian state of Kerala.

== Demographics ==
As of 2011 India census, Kunnumma had a population of 14252 with 6961 males and 7291 females.
