= Kumarapuram, Alappuzha =

Kumarapuram കുമാരപുരം
- Village
- Kumarapuram
- Kumarapuram Panchayath Junction

- Location in Kerala, India
- Coordinates: 9°17′0″N 76°26′0″E
- Country: India
- State: Kerala
- District: Alappuzha

Government
  - Type: Gram panchayat
  - Body: Kumarapuram Grama Panchayath

Area
  - Total: 13.75 km^{2} (5.31 sq mi)

Population
  - Total: 27,850
  - Density: 2,025/km^{2} (5,246/sq mi)

Languages
  - Official: Malayalam, English
- Time zone: UTC+5:30 (IST)
- PIN: 690548
- Telephone Code: 0479
- Vehicle registration: KL-29 (KAYAMKULAM SRTO)
- Nearest Town: Haripad
- Nearest City: Alappuzha
- Lok Sabha Constituency: Alappuzha
- Legislative assembly constituency: Haripad

Kumarapuram is a village in Alappuzha District of Kerala State of India. This place is mentioned in the famous Malayalam CBI (film series) and is the setting of Oru CBI Diary Kurippu. The famous Ananthapuram Palace also situated here.

== Places to visit ==
=== Ananthapuram Palace ===
Ananthapuram palace is one of the historical palace in Kumarapuram.

== Educational Institutions ==
=== KKKVM Higher Secondary School ===
Kerala Kalidasa Kerala Varma Memorial Higher Secondary School was established in 1960 as LP School. This school got High School status in 1968.

=== Government Technical High School ===
Government Technical High School was established in 1985 and it is managed by the Directorate of Technical Education, Kerala. It is located at south of Kavarattu Sree Mahadeva Temple. The school consists of Grades from 8 to 10.

=== Government U P School Erickavu ===
(Pazhayachira School) Govt UPS Erickavu was established in 1957 and it is managed by the Department of Education. It is located in Rural area. The school consists of Grades from 1 to 7.
