= Kanjikuzhy =

Village in Kerala, India

Kanjikuzhy is a village in Idukki, Kottayam, Alapuzha district in the Indian state of Kerala. The State Bank of India have one of their branches in the village.
