= Alappuzha district =

Alappuzha district Alleppey district
- District
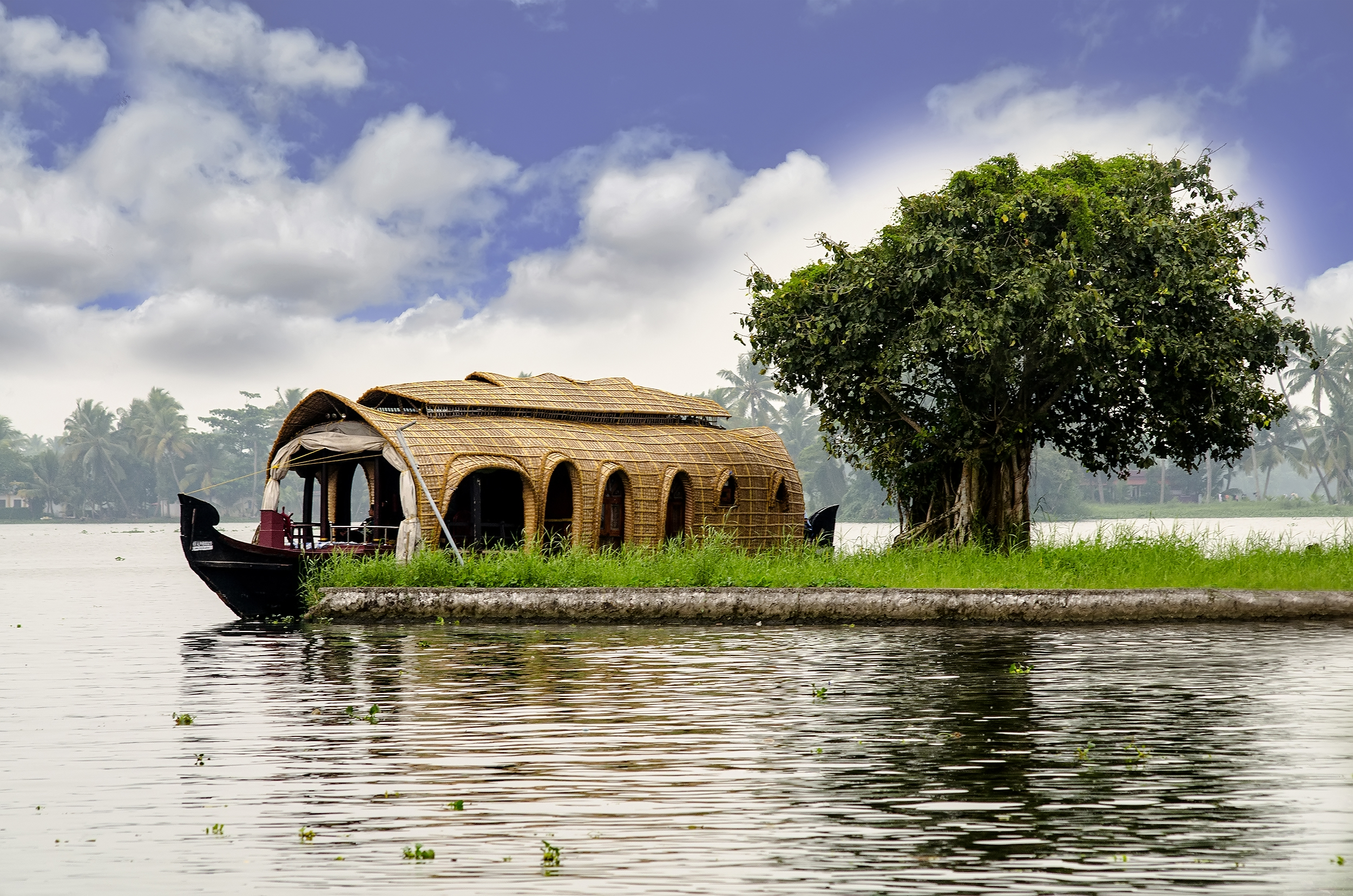
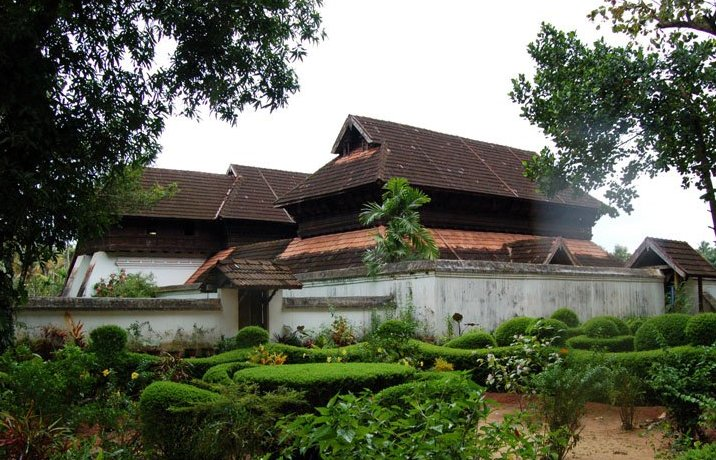
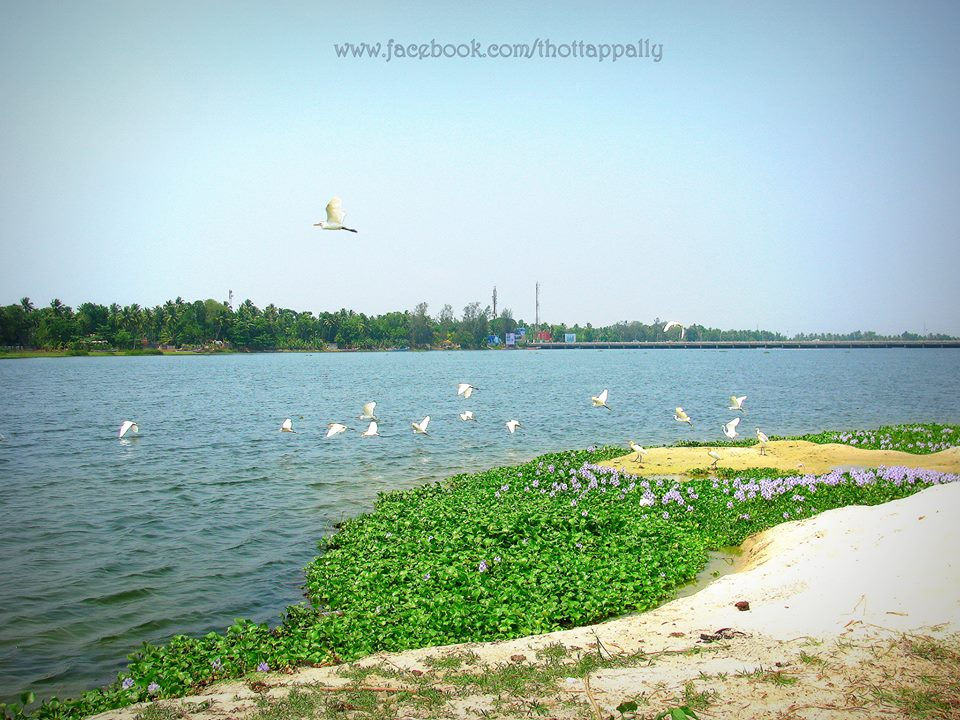
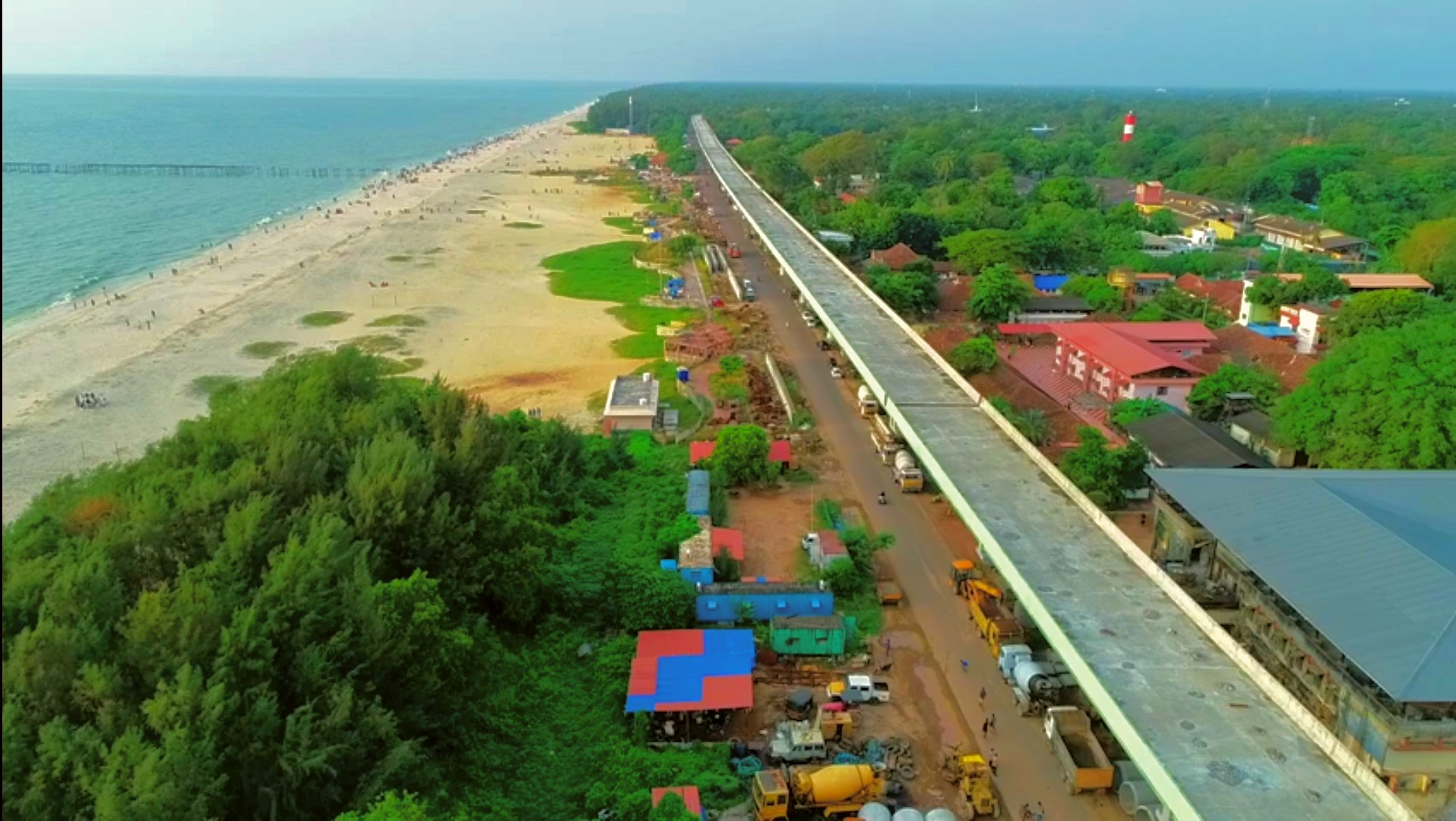
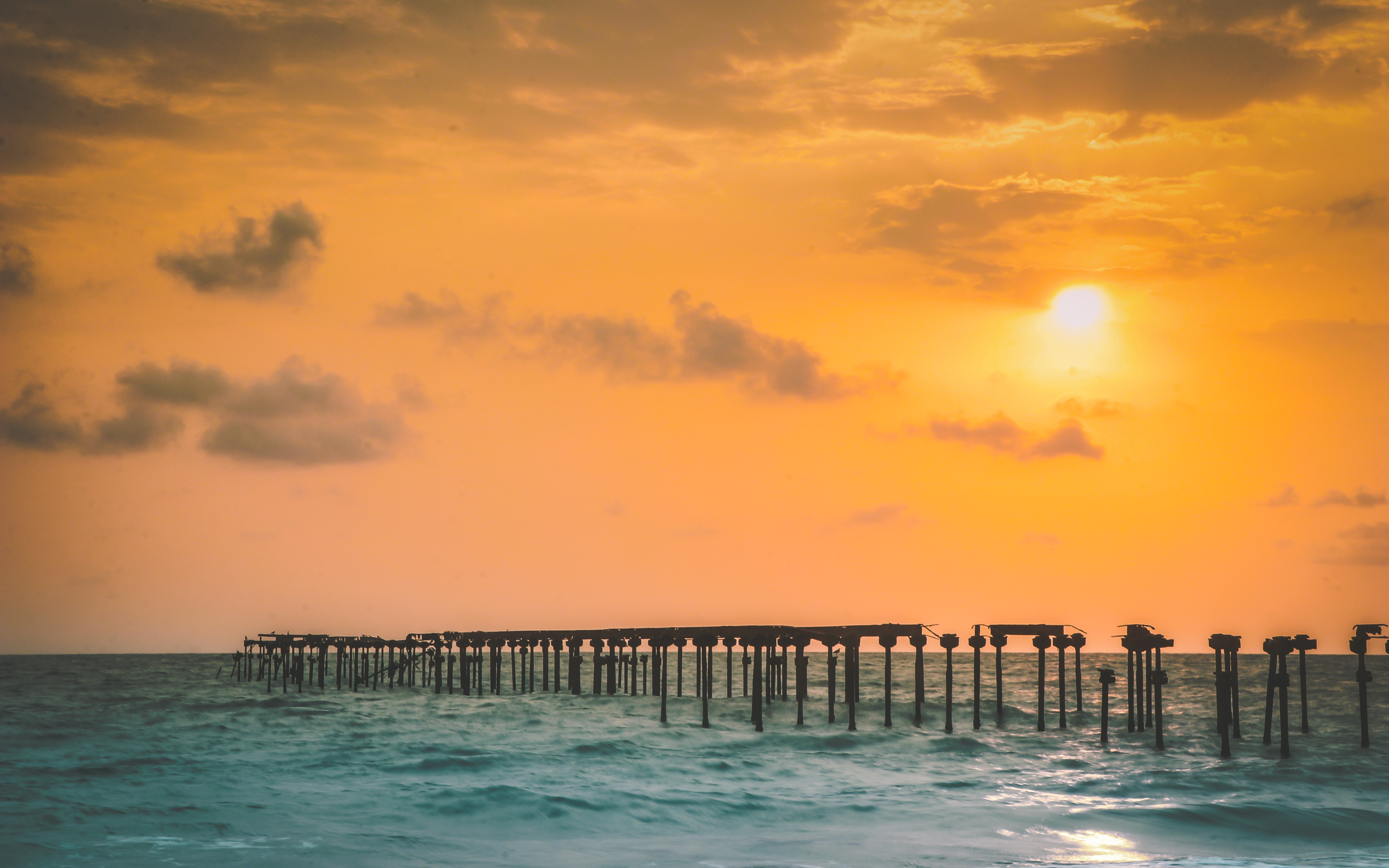
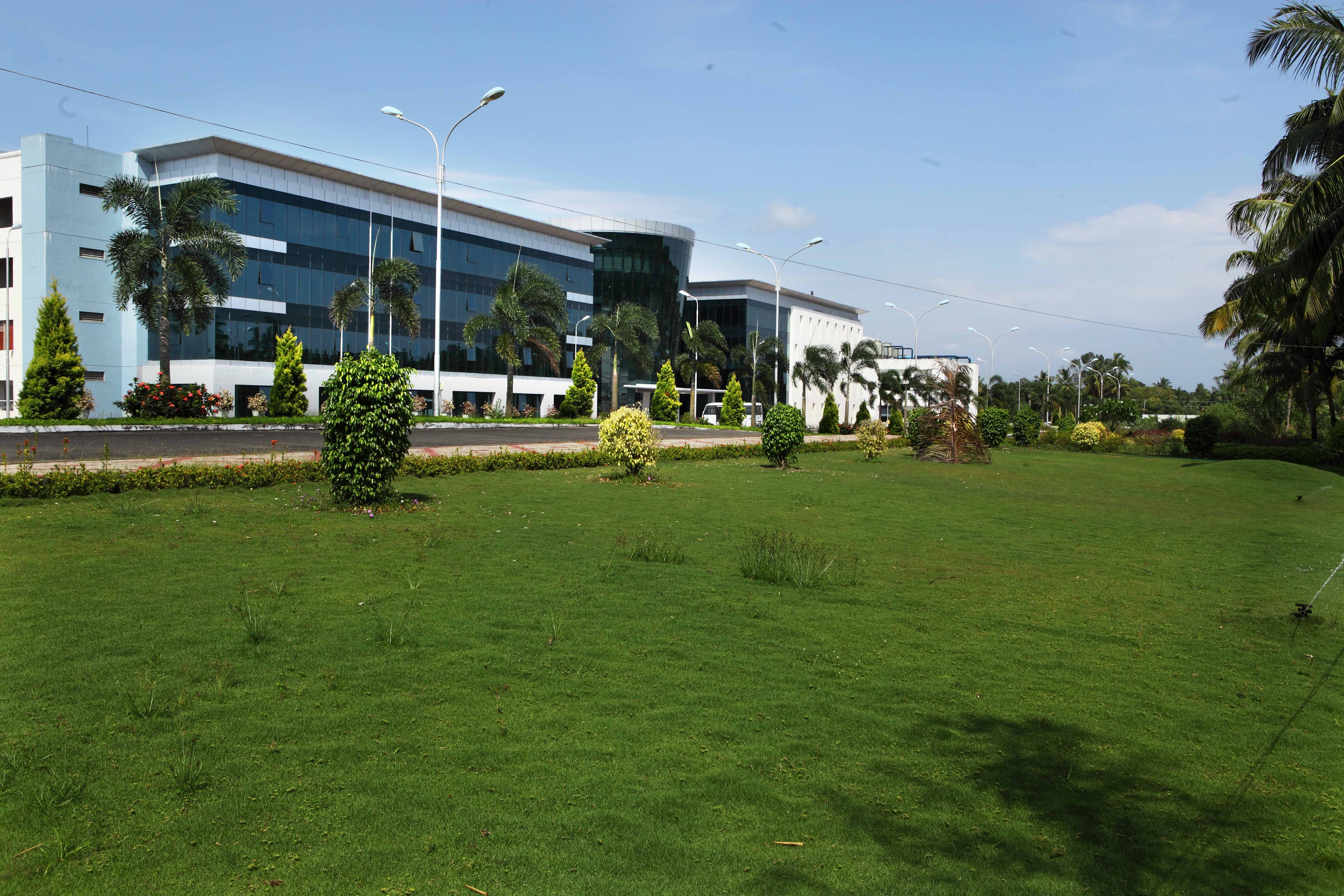
- Clockwise from top: Kettuvallam, Thottappally, Alappuzha Beach, Infopark Campus, Cherthala, Alappuzha Bypass, and Krishnapuram Palace at Kayamkulam.
- Nickname: Venice of the Eastern world King of Backwater
- Interactive map of Alappuzha district
- Coordinates: 9.49°N 76.49°E
- Country: India
- State: Kerala
- Headquarters: Alappuzha
- Subdivisions: Revenue divisions (2): Alappuzha; Chengannur; Taluks (6): Cherthala; Ambalappuzha; Kuttanadu; Karthikappally; Chengannur; Mavelikkara

Government
  - District Collector: Shaji V Nair, IAS
  - District Police Chief: MP Mohanachandran IPS

Area
  - Total: 1,414 km^{2} (546 sq mi)
  - Rank: 14th

Population (2011)
  - Total: 2,127,789
  - Density: 1,505/km^{2} (3,897/sq mi)

Languages
  - Official: Malayalam, English
- Time zone: UTC+5:30 (IST)
- ISO 3166 code: IN-KL
- Vehicle registration: KL-04 Alappuzha, KL-29 Kayamkulam, KL-30 Chengannur, KL-31 Mavelikara, KL-32 Cherthala, KL-66 Kuttanad
- HDI (2005): ▲0.794 ( High)
- Website: alappuzha.nic.in

Alappuzha district (Malayalam: [ɐːlɐpːuɻɐ]), is one of the 14 districts in the Indian state of Kerala. It was formed as Alleppey district on 17 August 1957, the name of the district being changed to Alappuzha in 1990. Alappuzha is the smallest district of Kerala. Alleppey town, the district headquarters, was renamed Alappuzha in 2012.

A town with canals, backwaters, beaches, and lagoons, Alappuzha was described by George Curzon, the British Governor-General of India in the beginning of the 20th century CE, as the "Venice of the Eastern world." The district is best known for its picturesque Kerala Backwaters, by which it is well connected to other parts of Kerala, including the tourist destination of Kumarakom, the district being a well known tourist destination in India. It is also known for its coir factories, as most of Kerala's coir industries are situated in and around the Alappuzha town.

The Vembanad lake, which lies below the sea level, is the longest lake in the Indian peninsula, and the district of Alappuzha lies between this lake and the Arabian Sea. Kuttanad region of the Alappuzha district, which lies below the sea level, is the point of least elevation in the entire India. Kuttanad, also known as The Rice Bowl of Kerala, has the lowest altitude in India, and is also one of the few places in the world where cultivation takes place below sea level.

The district was home to the Communist-led Punnapra-Vayalar uprising against the Divan of the British Princely state of Travancore in the 1940s.

Mariners club Alleppey (MCA) established in the year 2024, by a group of seafarers sailing in the merchant navy.

== Etymology ==
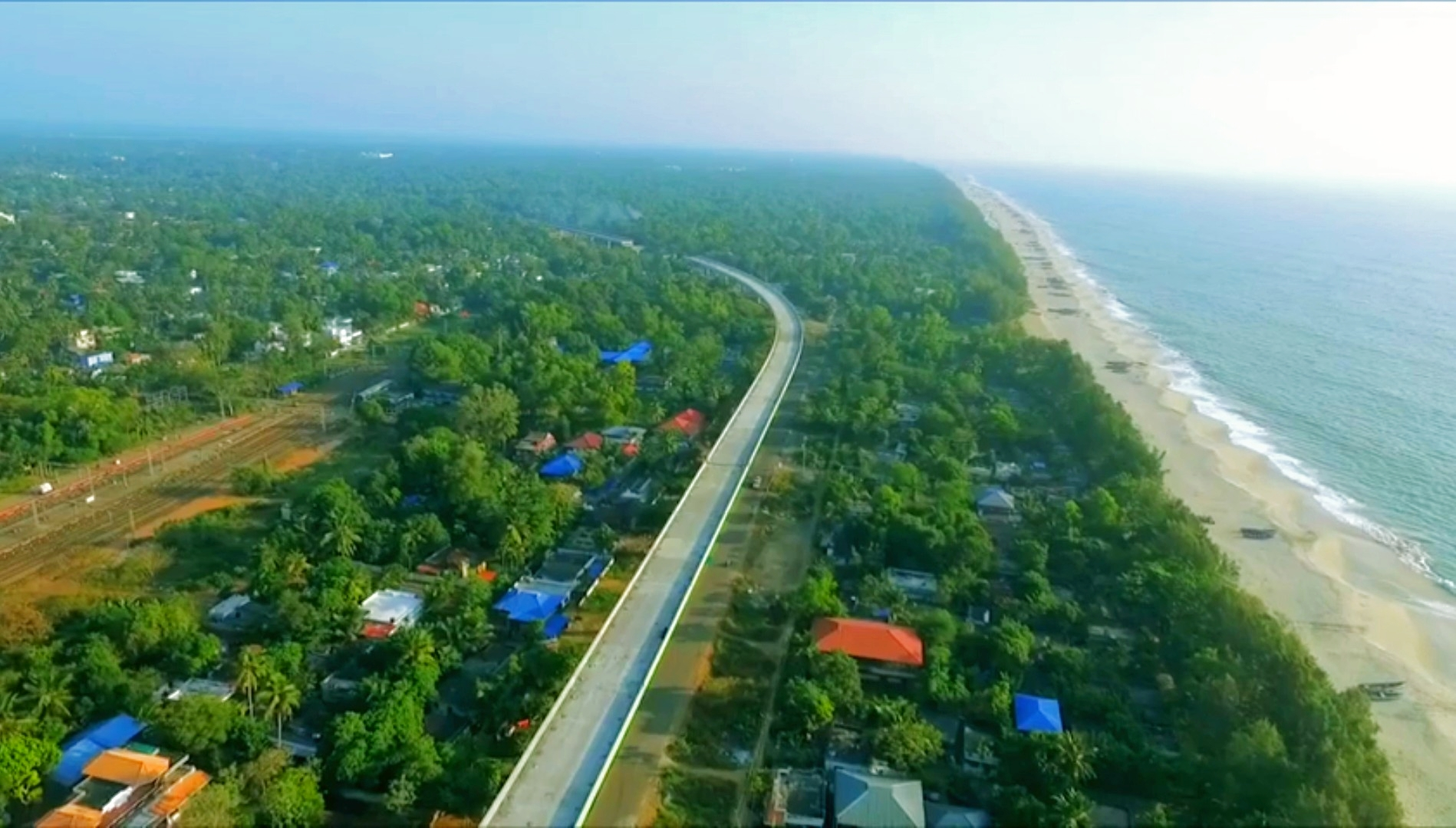
Alappuzha beach road view

Carved out of the erstwhile Kollam and Kottayam districts, most of the modern-day Alappuzha district was part of the Quilon district of the Travancore Kingdom, with a small portion in the northern Alappuzha were part of the Kottayam district of the Travancore Kingdom until 1957. when the modern Alappuzha district was formed. Alappuzha district was formed on 17 August 1957 and consisted initially of seven taluks, namely Cherthala, Ambalappuzha, Kuttanad, Chengannur, Karthikappally and Mavelikkara.

The name Ᾱlappuzha is a toponym. ‘Ᾱlayam’ means ‘home’ and ‘puzha’, according to Dr. Herman Gundert's dictionary, means ‘watercourse’ or ‘river’. The name refers to the network of waterways and backwaters in Alappuzha and its surrounding areas. The district is bounded on the north by Kochi and Kanayannur taluks of Ernakulam district, on the east by Vaikom, Kottayam and Changanassery taluks of Kottayam district and Thiruvalla, Kozhencherry and Adoor taluks of Pathanamthitta district, on the South by Kunnathur and Karunagappally taluks of Kollam district and on the west by Laccadive Sea.

Present-day Alappuzha district comprises six taluks, namely Cherthala, Ambalappuzha, Kuttanad, Karthikappally, Chengannur and Mavelikkara. The area of the district is 1,414 km^{2} (546 sq mi). Its headquarters is located at Alappuzha.

== History ==
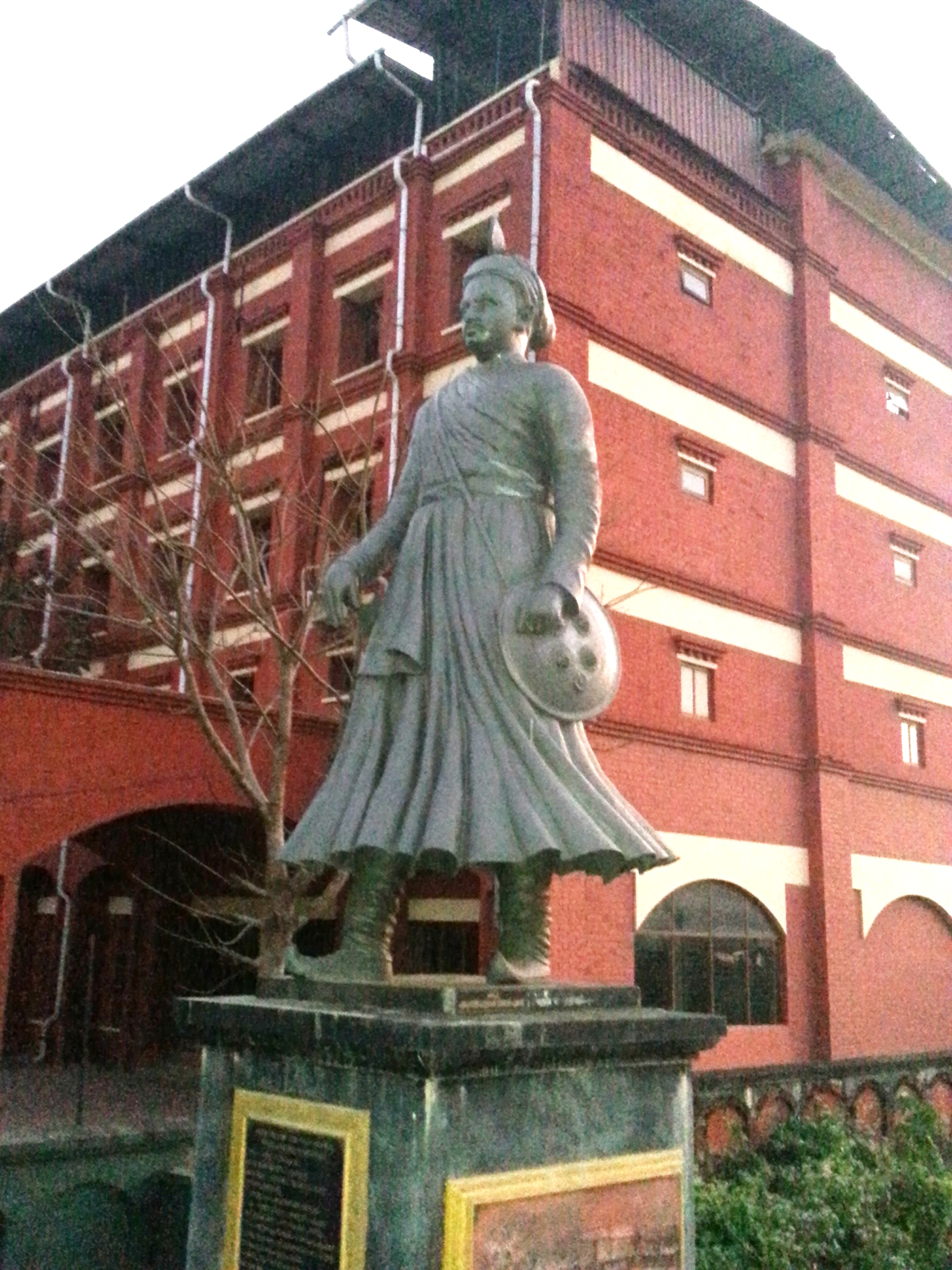
Raja Kesavadas Statue at Changanassery

The present-day town of Alappuzha owes its existence to Raja Kesavadas during the second half of the 18th century CE. However the district of Alappuzha had an important position in the classical Malayalam literature. Kuttanad, the rice bowl of Kerala, was well known from the early Sangam period itself.

=== Classical antiquity ===
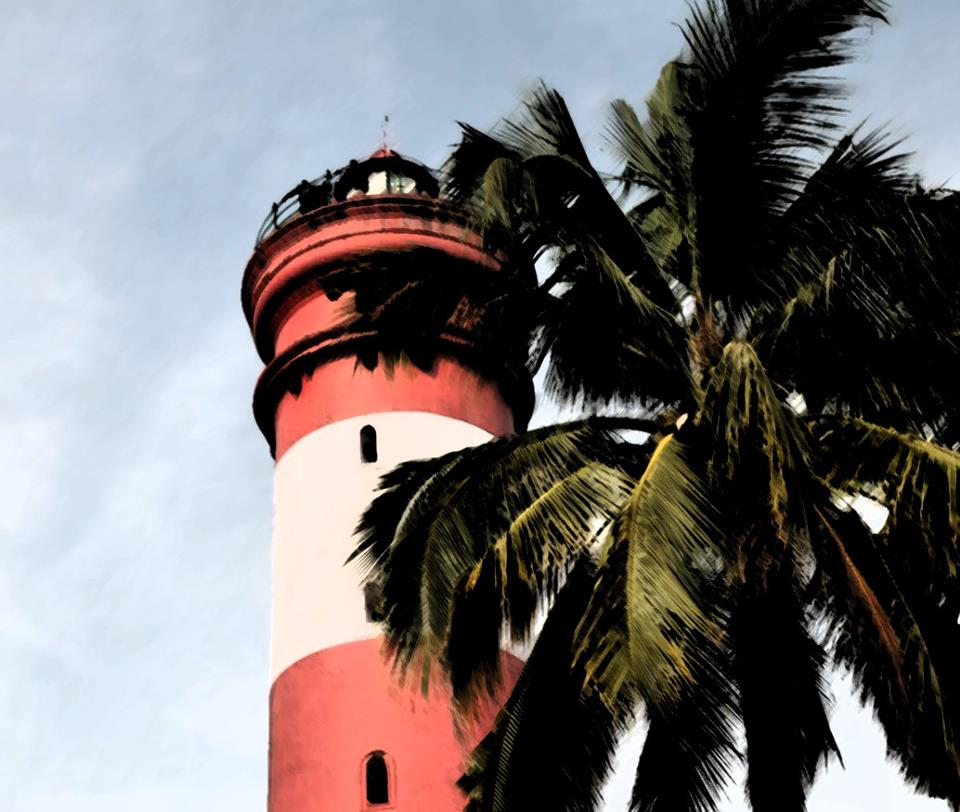
The Lighthouse at Purakkad

History records that the region which now constitutes the modern-day district of Alappuzha had trade relations with the ancient Greece, the ancient Rome, the ancient Levant, the ancient Arabian peninsula, and the Ancient Egypt during the Sangam period in the early centuries of the Common Era.

The ancient port town of Barace which is recorded as an important centre of the Indian Ocean trade in the ancient Greco-Roman travelogues such as the Periplus of the Erythraean Sea (written around 50 CE) is often identified with the modern-day coastal town of Purakkad on the mouth of the Pamba River in the Alappuzha district. This river is also the third-longest river in Kerala only after to the Periyar river and the Bharathappuzha river.

Early members of the Chera dynasty had their home in Kuttanad and were sometimes known as the Kuttuvans. However, the regions south of the Pamba River was ruled by the Ay kingdom during the ancient period. Pamba is mentioned as Baris in the ancient Greco-Roman travelogues. There are archaeological evidences of the early period of this district, including ancient fossils, stone inscriptions and monuments, in the archeological sites like the excavation sites, the caves, the temples, etc. The literary works of the Sangam period also help to take a look into the ancient period of the district.

Alappuzha district was once a prominent centre of Buddhism in South India prior to the arrival of Nambudiri Brahmins into the region. Sri Mulavasam was then a prominent Buddhist pilgrimage centre in the Indian peninsula. Numerous remnants of once flourished Buddhism have been found from the taluks of Ambalappuzha and Mavelikara.

=== Medieval history ===
The regions included in the district had a prominent position in the medieval Malayalam literary works such as Unnuneeli Sandesam. One among the famous literary works of this period was the Ascharya Choodamani, a Sanskrit drama written by Sakthibhadra who was a scholar from Chengannur.

The feudal monarch of Chempakasseri was at its zenith during the reign of Pooradam Thirunal Devanarayanan, a great scholar and a poet who was also the author of the literary work Vedantha Ratnamala. It is said that Ambalappuzha Sri Krishna Temple, at Ambalappuzha, was constructed and the idol of Lord Krishna installed during that time. Chempakassery was ruled by Brahmin monarchs during the medieval period.

It is believed that Melpathur Narayana Bhattathiri, Kumaran Namboothiri, and Neelakanta Deekshithar were eminent scholars who patronized his court.

=== Feudal principalities during the medieval period ===
The southern regions of the modern-day Alappuzha district once formed part of the erstwhile "kingdom of Odanad" (also known as the "kingdom of Kayamkulam" or known by the name "Onattukara"), which was later invaded by the Travancorean forces in the year 1746. It was a branch of the ancient Ay kingdom. It was also known as the Chirava Swaroopam, where the word Chirava derives from the combination of two Malayalam words, Cheru and Aayi, which means "a smaller branch of the Ay kingdom". It included some parts of the modern-day Taluks of Chengannur, Mavelikara, Karthikappally, and Karunagappally.

The northernmost region of the district, which curresponds to the present-day Taluk of Cherthala, was ruled by the "Kingdom of Karappuram" prior to the 1762 treaty that was signed between the kingdom of Travancore and the Kingdom of Cochin. Karappuram was a tributary of the Kingdom of Cochin until 1762 when it was handed over to the kingdom of Travancore. The headquarters of the "Madathingal branch" of the Cochin Royal family was situated at Madathinkara in Karappuram.

South of Karappuram lied the "Chempakassery kingdom" which was also known by the name the "Kingdom of Purakkad" prior to the Travancorean conquest of 1746. The kingdom of Chempakassery included the modern-day Taluks of Ambalappuzha and Kuttanad. The monarch of Chempakassery was known by the title "Chempakassery Deva Narayanan". Melpathur Narayana Bhattathiri and Kunchan Nambiar, who originally hailed from the South Malabar region, were court poets of the Chempakassery kingdom at times.

Karthikappally was a small feudal kingdom that lied between the feudal kingdoms of Odanad and Chempakassery until the Travancorean invasion of the mid-18th century CE, which curresponds to the modern-day Taluk of Karthikappally. The southernmost portion of the district had been once part of the erstwhile feudal kingdom of Karunagappally, which had been subordinate to the Chirava Swaroopam (Kayamkulam) at times.

=== Progress and Social Reformation during the Travancore era (1746–1947) ===
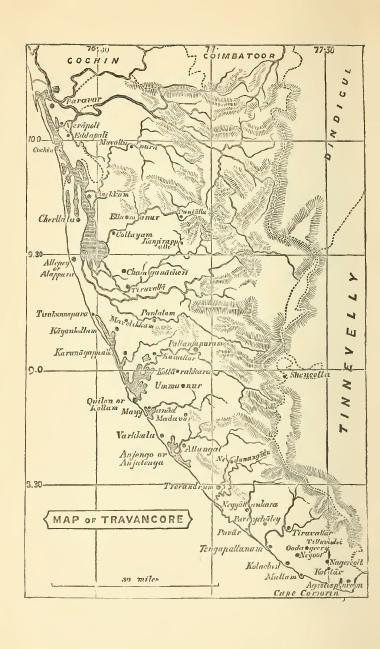
A map of the British Princely state of Travancore published in 1871

In the 17th century the Portuguese power declined on the Malabar Coast and the Dutch Malabar gained a predominant position in the principalities of this district. The church located at Kokkamangalam or Kokkothamangalam is believed to be one of the seven churches founded by St. Thomas the Apostle, one of the twelve disciples of Jesus Christ according to the oral traditions. The picturesque CSI Christ Church in Alappuzha town was built in 1816 by the first CMS (Church Missionary Society) missionary to India, Rev. Thomas Norton. It was the first Anglican Church to be established in the erstwhile state of Travancore.

It was during the mid-18th century CE that the Maharaja Marthanda Varma, popularly known as the ‘Architect of the Modern Travancore’, interfered in the political affairs of the smaller feudal principalities who ruled parts of the district. Marthandavarma Maharaja had a remarkable role in the internal progress of the district. The Krishnapuram Palace, which is now a protected monument of the State Archaeology Department, was constructed during his administrative period. He was known as the "Architect of the Modern Alleppey" and played a key role in making Alappuzha a premier port town of Travancore.

During the reign of Balaramavarma Maharaja, Velu Thampi Dalava took keen interest in the development of the town and the port. He brought whole area of the Pathiramanal island into coconut cultivation and its larger tracts into paddy cultivation. The role of Velu Thampi Dalava in the development of Alappuzha is worth mentioning. In the 19th century the district attained progress in all spheres.

Kayamkulam Kochunni was a heroic outlaw from Kayamkulam who lived during the 19th century CE. The 19th century social reformer Arattupuzha Velayudha Panicker hails from the modern-day district of Alappuzha.

The first modern factory for the manufacture of Coir mats and mattings was also established in 1859 at Alappuzha. The Alappuzha Town Improvement Committee was set up in 1894. During the Travancorean administration, Cherthala taluk was included in the Northern division (Kottayam division) while rest of the Taluks which together constitute the modern-day district of Alappuzha was placed under the Central division (Kollam division) of the British Princely state of Travancore.

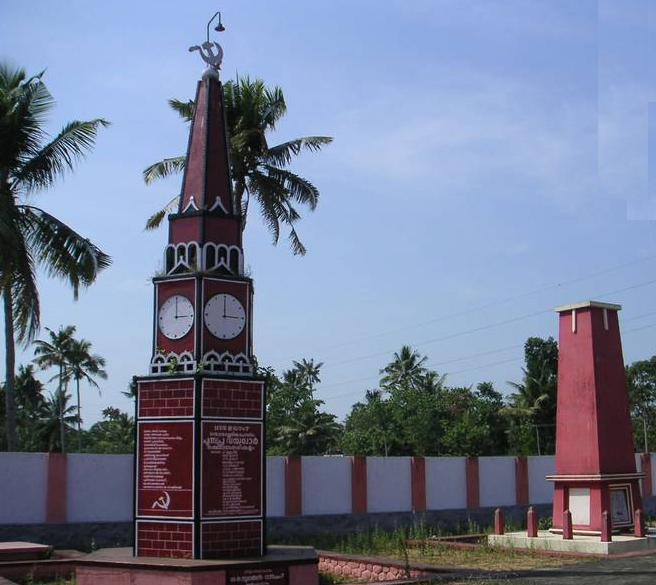
The Communist memorial column in memory of the Punnapra-Vayalar uprising which occurred in 1946 against the Divan of the British Princely state of Travancore.

This district played a prominent role in the freedom struggle of Travancore. The campaign for the eradication of Untouchability was organized much earlier in this district by T.K. Madhavan, a journalist and in 1925 the approach roads to the temples, especially to the Ambalappuzha Sree Krishna Swamy Temple, were thrown open to the Hindus of all castes. The district also witnessed the 'Nivarthana' movement which was started as a protest against the constitutional repression in 1932. The first political strike in Kerala was held at Alappuzha in 1938. The district was home to the Communist-led Punnapra-Vayalar uprising against the Divan of the British Princely state of Travancore in the 1940s.

== Geography ==
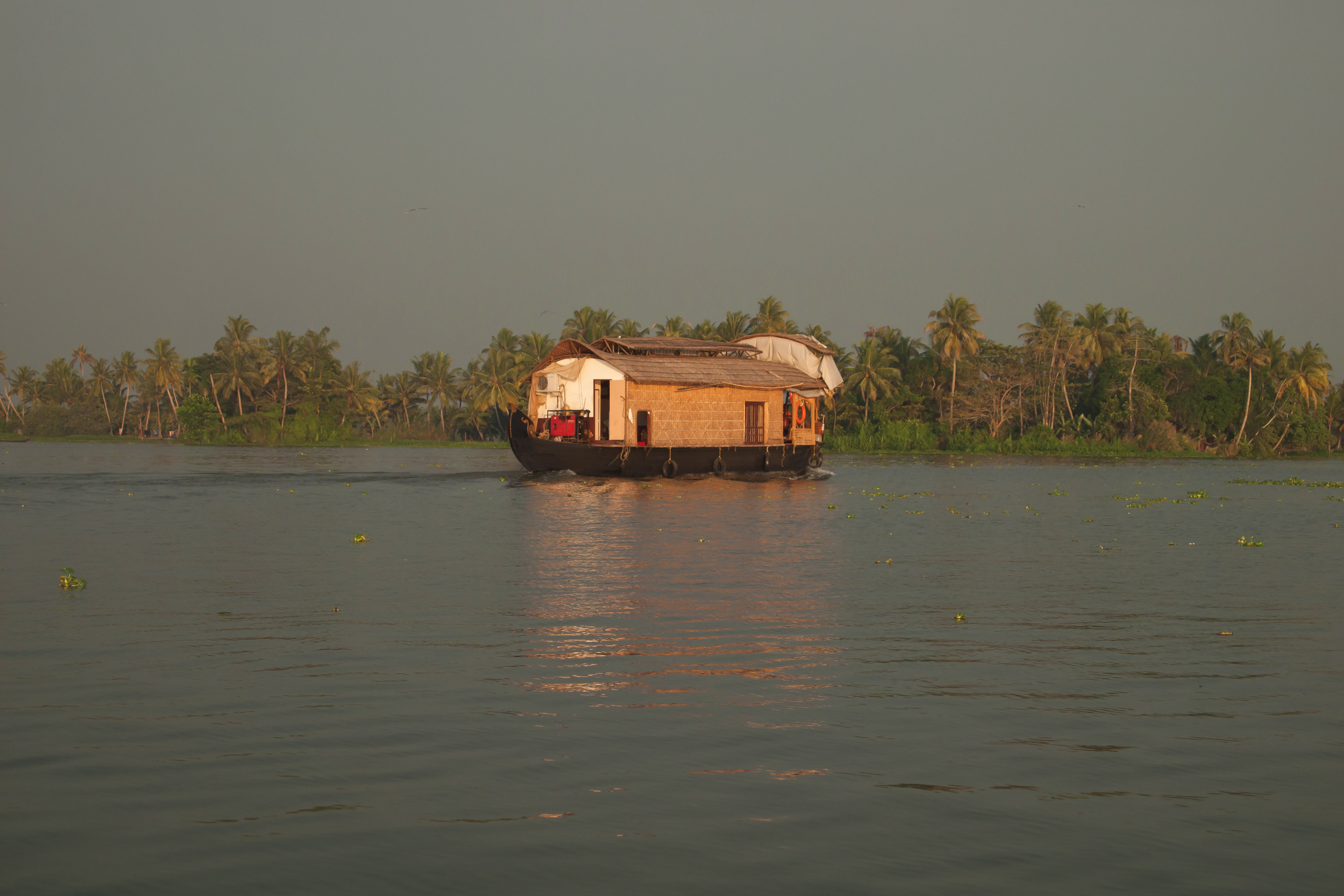
The Vembanad Lake

Alappuzha is on a peninsular landmass between the Arabian Sea and the Vembanad lake. Major rivers are the Manimala, the Pamba, and the Achankovil; their branches and tributaries flow through Alappuzha and empty into the Vembanad lake. The most important lake is Vembanad.

== Forest and wildlife ==
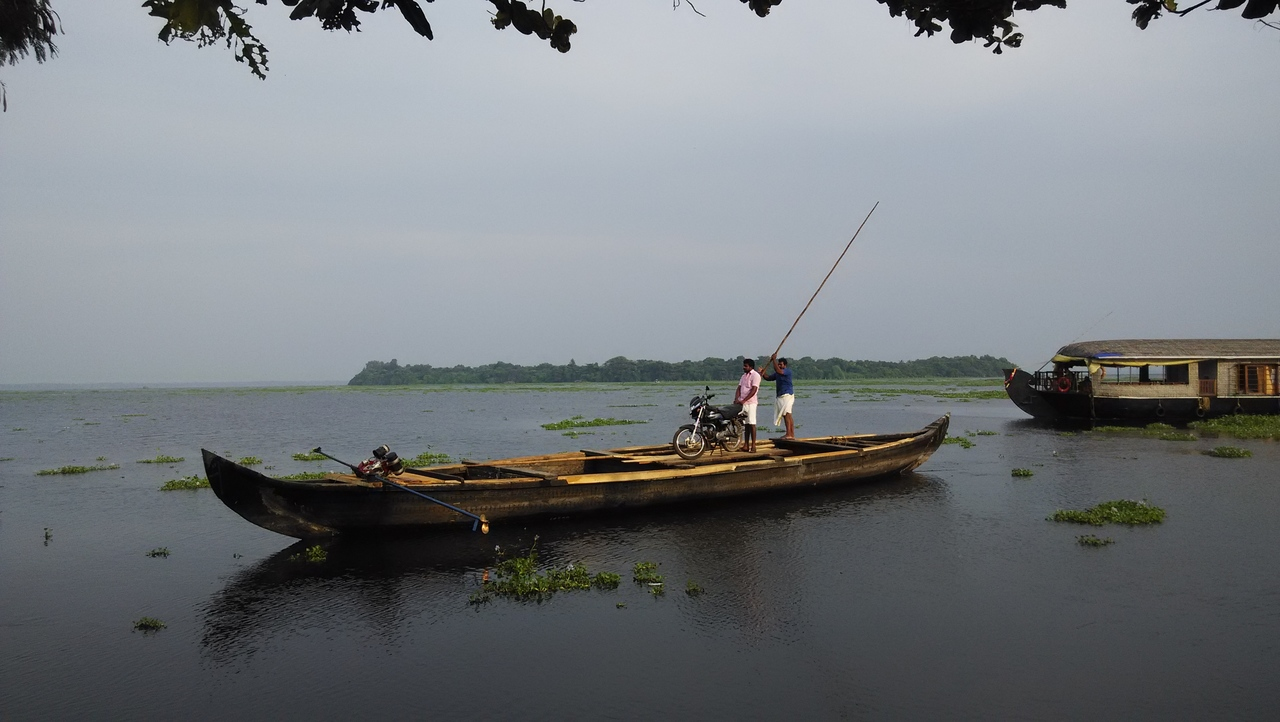
The Pathiramanal island – a view from Muhamma

Alappuzha was the only district in Kerala without public forest land. But that changed in 2013, when 14.5 acres (5.9 ha) of land at Veeyapuram was declared as reserved forest by the Forest and Wildlife Department.

Pathiramanal island on the Vembanad lake of Alappuzha district is famous for rare migrating birds.

== Administration ==
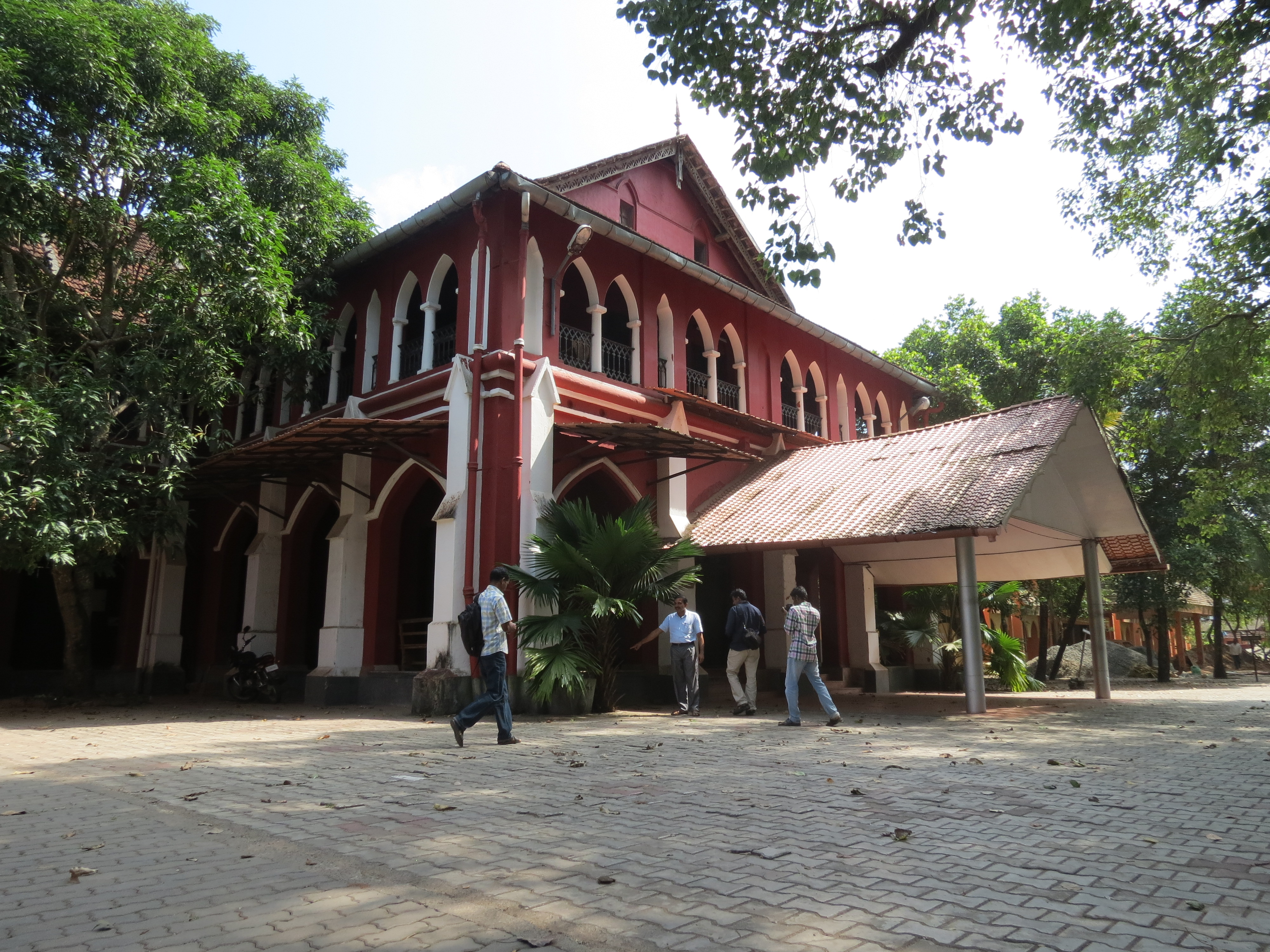
Alappuzha District Court

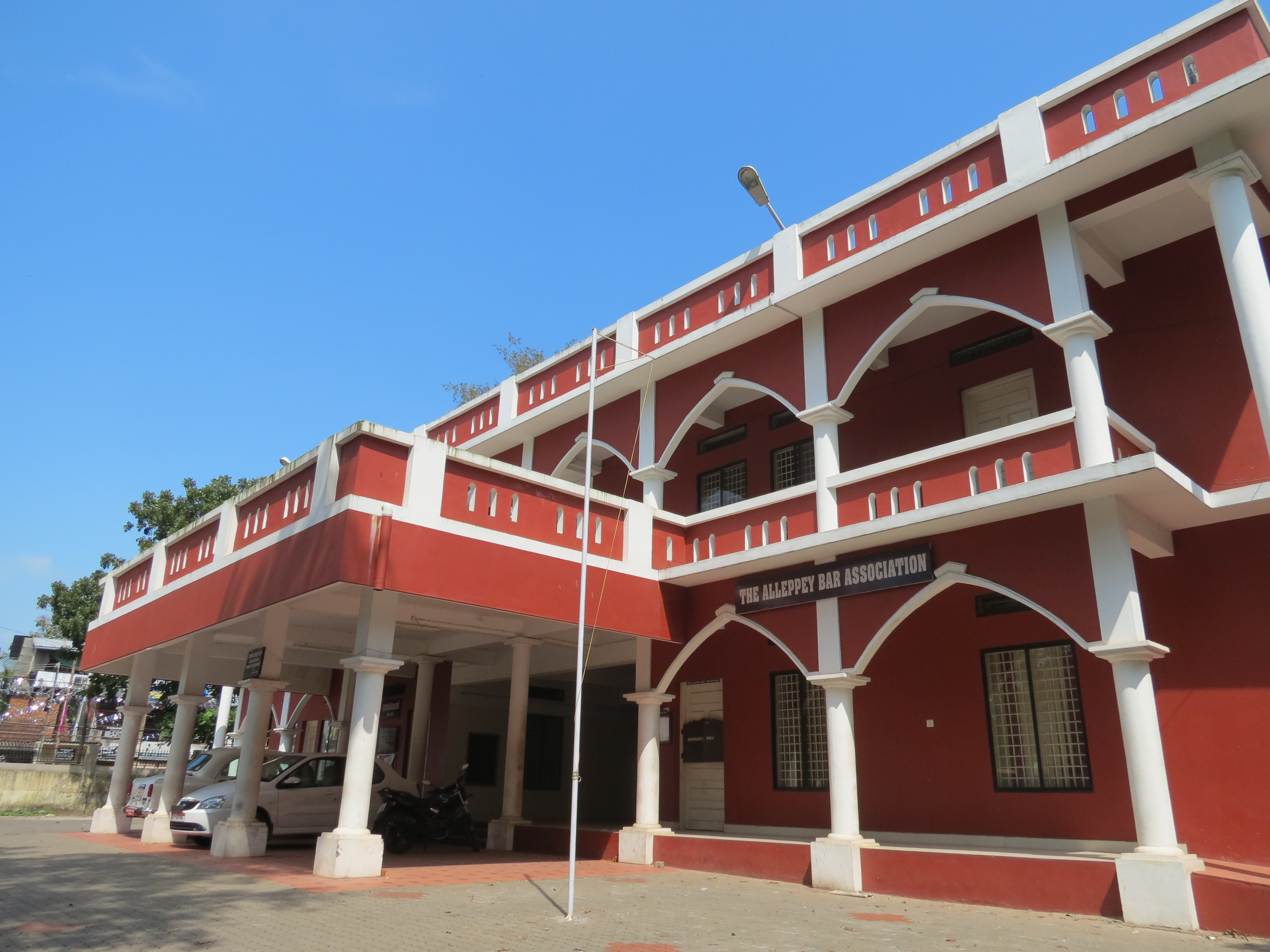
Alleppey Bar Association

Alappuzha city is the administrative headquarters of the Alappuzha district. The district is divided into two revenue divisions-Alappuzha and Chengannur.

=== Municipal towns ===
There are 6 municipal towns in the district. They are:

- Alappuzha
- Chengannur
- Cherthala
- Haripad
- Kayamkulam
- Mavelikara

=== Legislative representation ===
There are two Lok Sabha constituencies in Alappuzha: Alappuzha and Mavelikara.

District	No.	Constituency	Name	Party	Alliance	Remarks
Alappuzha	102	Aroor	Shanimol Osman	INC	UDF	Deputy Speaker
Alappuzha	103	Cherthala	P. Prasad	CPI	LDF	
Alappuzha	104	Alappuzha	A.D.Thomas	INC	UDF	
Alappuzha	105	Ambalappuzha	G. Sudhakaran	IND	UDF	
Alappuzha	106	Kuttanad	Reji Cheriyan	KC	UDF	
Alappuzha	107	Haripad	Ramesh Chennithala	INC	UDF	Minister for Home, Vigilance, and Coir
Alappuzha	108	Kayamkulam	M. Liju	INC	UDF	Minister of Excise & Cooperation
Alappuzha	109	Mavelikara (SC)	M. S. Arun Kumar	CPI(M)	LDF	
Alappuzha	110	Chengannur	Saji Cherian	CPI(M)	LDF	

=== Taluks ===
The district is divided into two revenue divisions which together incorporate six Taluks within them.

- Taluks in the Alappuzha Revenue Division are:

Cherthala	Ambalappuzha	Kuttanad

- Taluks in the Chengannur Revenue Division are:

Karthikappally	Mavelikkara	Chengannur

=== Revenue villages ===
Alappuzha district is divided into 93 revenue villages for the ease and decentralisation of its revenue administration. They are further incorporated into 6 taluks as eludicated below.

==== Cherthala Taluk ====
- Arookutty
- Aroor
- Arthunkal
- Cherthala North
- Cherthala South
- Ezhupunna
- Kadakkarappally
- Kanjikuzhy
- Kodamthuruth
- Kokkothamangalam
- Kuthiyathode
- Mararikulam North
- Pallippuram
- Panavally
- Pattanakkad
- Perumbalam
- Thanneermukkom North
- Thanneermukkom South
- Thuravoor South
- Thaikkattussery
- Vayalar East

==== Ambalappuzha Taluk ====
- Alappuzha West
- Ambalappuzha
- Ambalappuzha North
- Aryad South
- Thumpoly
- Kalavoor
- Karumady
- Komalapuram
- Mannancherry
- Mullakkal
- Paravur-Alappuzha
- Pathirappally
- Pazhaveedu
- Punnapra
- Purakkad

==== Kuttanad Taluk ====
- Champakulam
- Edathua
- Kainakary North
- Kainakary South
- Kavalam
- Kunnumma
- Muttar
- Nedumudi
- Neelamperoor
- Pulinkunnoo
- Ramankary
- Thakazhy
- Thalavady
- Veliyanad

==== Karthikappally Taluk ====
- Arattupuzha
- Cheppad
- Cheruthana
- Chingoli
- Haripad
- Kandalloor
- Karthikappally
- Karuvatta
- Kayamkulam
- Keerikkad
- Krishnapuram
- Kumarapuram
- Muthukulam
- Pallippad
- Pathiyoor
- Puthuppally
- Thrikkunnapuzha
- Veeyapuram

==== Mavelikara Taluk ====
- Bharanikkavu
- Chennithala
- Chunakkara
- Kannamangalam
- Kattanam
- Mavelikara
- Nooranad
- Palamel
- Perungala
- Thamarakkulam
- Thazhakkara
- Thekkekara
- Thriperumthura
- Vallikunnam
- Vettiyar

==== Chengannur Taluk ====
- Ala
- Chengannur
- Cheriyanad
- Ennakkad
- Kurattissery
- Mannar
- Mulakuzha
- Pandanad
- Puliyoor
- Thiruvanvandoor
- Venmony

=== List of district collectors ===
List of Collectors of Alappuzha District according to length of tenure in descending order. The longest serving District Collector of Alappuzha was K. Balakrishna Kurup and the shortest serving District Collector was Sriram Venkitaraman.

K. Balakrishna Kurup served for 1146 days from 2 June 1980 to 23 July 1983, but from July 26, 2022, to August 2, 2022, Sriram Venkitaraman served for only 7 days from 26 July 2022 to 2 August 2022.

#	Collector	Number of days
1	Sriram Venkitaraman	7
2	P. Venugopal	20
3	P. M. Abraham	38
4	V. Retheesan	42
5	V. K. Vasudevan	73
6	K. J. John	85
7	Mini Antony	100
8	P. Venugopal	102
9	Adeela Abdulla	141
10	Renu Raj	144
11	K. R. Viswambharan	170
12	R. Girija	176
13	M. Anjana	196
14	Paul Antony	212
15	K. B. Warrier	228
16	Saurabh Jain	230
17	P. Venugopal	240
18	Romanus Horo	261
19	T. V. Anupama	281
20	E. Shahul Hameed	282
21	K. M. Abraham	305
22	V. R. Padmanabahan	309
23	P. Velayudhan nair	315
24	N. C. Surendran	350
25	P. Sreedhara Menon	352
26	M. N. Gunavardhanan	363
27	Veena N. Madhavan	371
28	Suhas S.	377
29	K. B. A. Hameed	379
30	A. K. K. Nambiar	396
31	S. Ayyappan Nair	397
32	Pradeepkumar	416
33	M. N. Gunavardhanan	419
34	Kshatrapati Shivaji	439
35	K. Ramunni Menon	444
36	N. Kaleeswaran	462
37	K. Narayanan	463
38	M. Dandapani	463
39	V. J. Kurian	481
40	T. V. Swaminathan	530
41	K. Rose	590
42	A. Alexandar	637
43	P. Venugopal	646
44	K. R. Muraleedharan	649
45	K. Bhaskaran Nair	684
46	V. K. Balakrishnan	686
47	C. P. Ramakrishna Pillai	695
48	Jose Cyriac K.	760
49	R. Narayanan	795
50	T. G. Rajendran	895
51	K. M. Ramanandan	931
52	P. Bharathan	988
53	K. Sivasankaran Nair	993
54	N. Padmakumar	1039
55	K. Balakrishna Kurup	1146

== Demographics ==
Historical population
Year	Pop.	±% p.a.
1901	509,545	—
1911	585,094	+1.39%
1921	693,538	+1.71%
1931	865,222	+2.24%
1941	983,184	+1.29%
1951	1,165,845	+1.72%
1961	1,404,269	+1.88%
1971	1,671,286	+1.76%
1981	1,865,455	+1.11%
1991	2,001,217	+0.70%
2001	2,109,160	+0.53%
2011	2,127,789	+0.09%

Area	1414 km^{2} – 3.64% of area of the state
Population	2,127,789 – 6.61% of the population of the state (2011)
Population density	1504/km^{2} (2011)
Literacy	97.36%–94.24% (2011)
Sex ratio	1100 females/1000 males
Urbanization	29.46%

According to the 2011 census, Alappuzha district has a population of 2,127,789, roughly equal to the nation of Namibia or the US state of New Mexico. This gives it a ranking of 216th in India (out of a total of 640). The district has a population density of 1,504 inhabitants per square kilometre (3,900/sq mi) . Its population growth rate over the decade 2001–2011 was 0.88%. Alappuzha has a sex ratio of 1100 females for every 1000 males, and a literacy rate of 95.72%. 53.96% of the population lives in urban areas. Scheduled Castes and Scheduled Tribes make up 9.46% and 0.31% of the population respectively.

Malayalam is the predominant language, spoken by 99.00% of the population. There is a small minority of Konkani speakers in urban areas.

It has the highest population density among all districts of the state. It is 29.46% urbanized, and is the smallest district in Kerala.

=== Religion ===
Religions in Alappuzha district (2011)
Religion	Percent
Hinduism	68.64%
Christianity	20.45%
Islam	10.55%
Other or not stated	0.36%

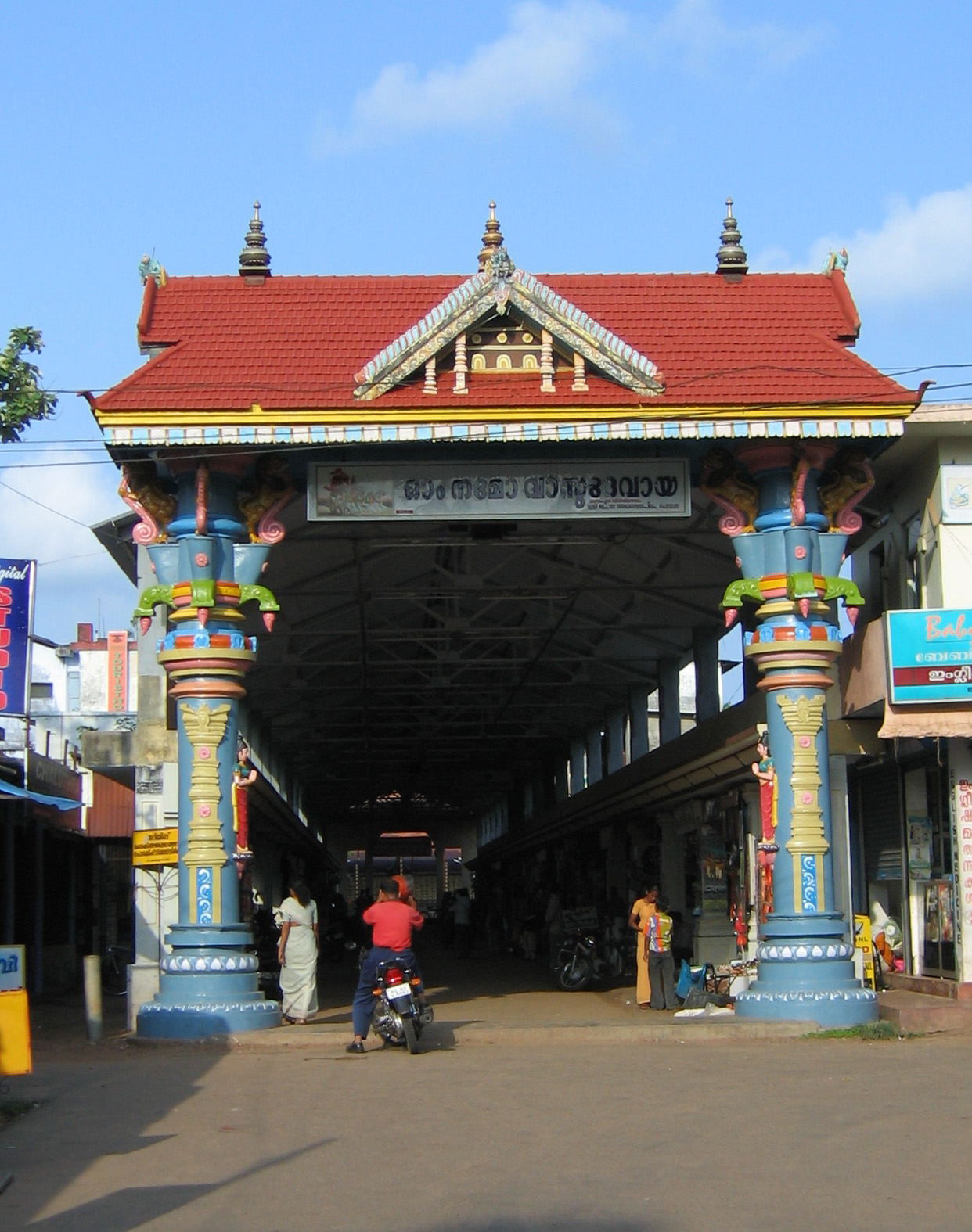
Entrance of Ambalappuzha Sri Krishna Temple

According to the 2011 Indian Census, the Hindu population stood at 68.64%, Christian (Syro Malabar Catholics, Orthodox, Marthoma, Pentecostal, Latin Catholics and Malankara Catholics) at 20.45%, and Muslim population at 10.55%. Though all the taluks of the district has a clear hindu majority, The Christians form a large minority in all parts of the district and among them, Kuttanad has the highest Christian population and is a hub for the Syro-Malabar Church and Chengannur is a center for the Orthodox Churches. While, The Latin Catholics are speard out in the coastal belts.

==== Religions in Alappuzha District (Taluk wise) ====
According to the 2011 Census of India, the religious composition of Alappuzha district shows significant variation across its taluks.

Taluk	Hindu (%)	Muslim (%)	Christian (%)	Others / Not stated (%)
Cherthala	72.41	6.21	21.05	0.31
Ambalappuzha	56.58	19.85	23.31	0.24
Kuttanad	59.64	0.67	39.34	0.35
Karthikappally	75.81	15.75	8.09	0.36
Chengannur	68.59	4.37	26.51	0.53
Mavelikkara	75.44	7.98	16.09	0.50

== Major Towns ==
- Cherthala taluk: Aroor, Thuravoor, Cherthala, Arookutty, Ezhupunna, Kanjikuzhy, Arthunkal, Vayalar
- Ambalapuzha taluk: Alappuzha, Ambalapuzha, Kalavoor, Purakkad, Aryad, Thumpoly, Valavanadu, Pathirappally, Punnapra
- Kuttanad taluk: Champakulam, Edathua, Kainakary, Thakazhy, Thalavady, Nedumudi, Mankombu, Kavalam, Muttar
- Karthikappally taluk: Haripad, Kayamkulam, Cheppad, Chingoli, Karthikappally, Muthukulam, Pathiyoor, Pallippad, Krishnapuram, Arattupuzha
- Mavelikkara taluk: Mavelikara, Chennithala, Chettikulangara, Bharanikavu, Charumood, Nooranad, Mavelikkara Thekkekara, Edappon, Thazhakara
- Chengannur taluk: Chengannur, Budhanoor, Pandanad, Puliyoor, Venmoney, Cheriyanad, Mulakuzha, Mannar

== Transport ==
=== Road ===
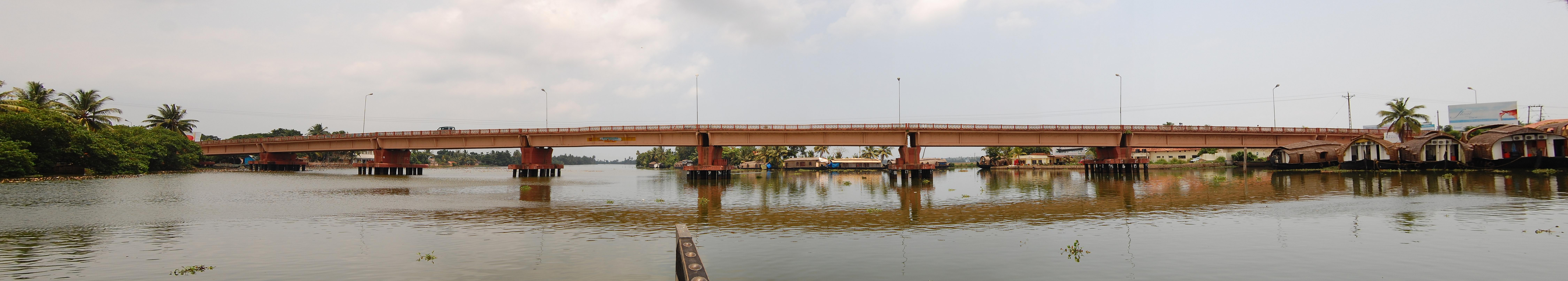
Pallathuruthy bridge

==== National Highways ====
National Highway 66 (India) is one of the longest national highways in India. It connects Panvel to Kanyakumari passes through the city and allow to connect other major cities like Mumbai, Goa, Udupi, Mangalore, Kannur, Kozhikode, Guruvayur, Ernakulam, Kollam, and Trivandrum. The construction of the Alappuzha Bypass, to route the national highway around city centers between Kommady and Kalarkode, is completed; and the highway was opened on 28 January 2021. Alappuzha is also well connected by road. There is a plan to upgrade State Highway 11 (Kerala) to national highway status which helps to connect Alappuzha to Kodaikanal as part of promoting coastal-hill tourism project.

==== State Highways ====
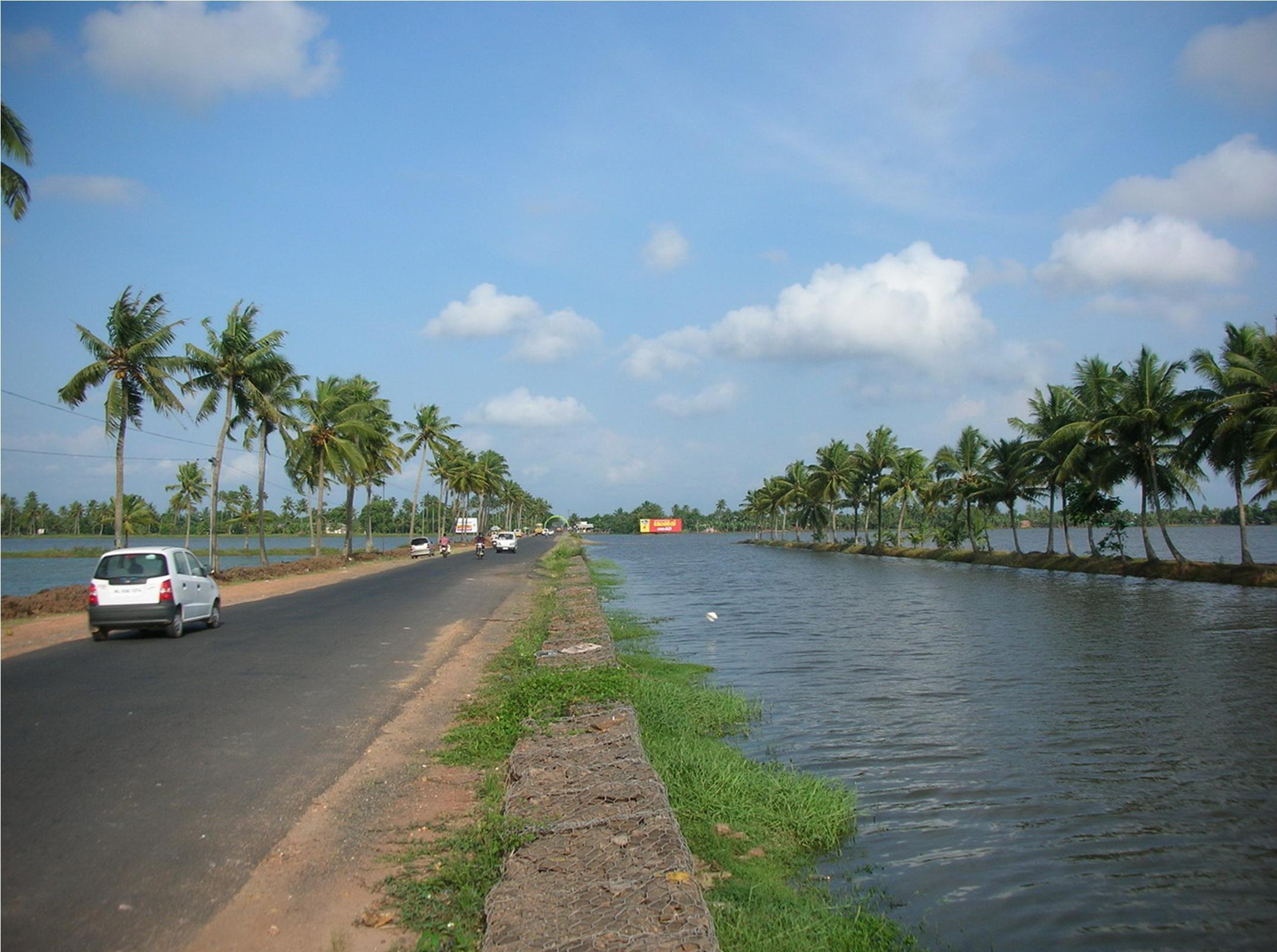
State Highway 11 (Kerala)

There are eight state highways in Alappuzha district and three of them originates from Alappuzha town. State Highway 11 (Kerala) is a state Highway that starts in Kalarcode, Alappuzha and ends in Perunna, Changanassery. The road is popularly known as AC road (Alappuzha Changanassery) road and it has 24.2 km length. It is an important busy road which connects Alappuzha city with Kottayam district. State Highway 40 (Kerala) is an interstate state highway in Alappuzha district which connects with Alappuzha town to Madurai, Tamil Nadu. It is the only interstate state highway in Alappuzha district. State Highway 66 (Kerala) is a state highway which originates from Alappuzha town and terminates at Thoppumpady, Ernakulam.

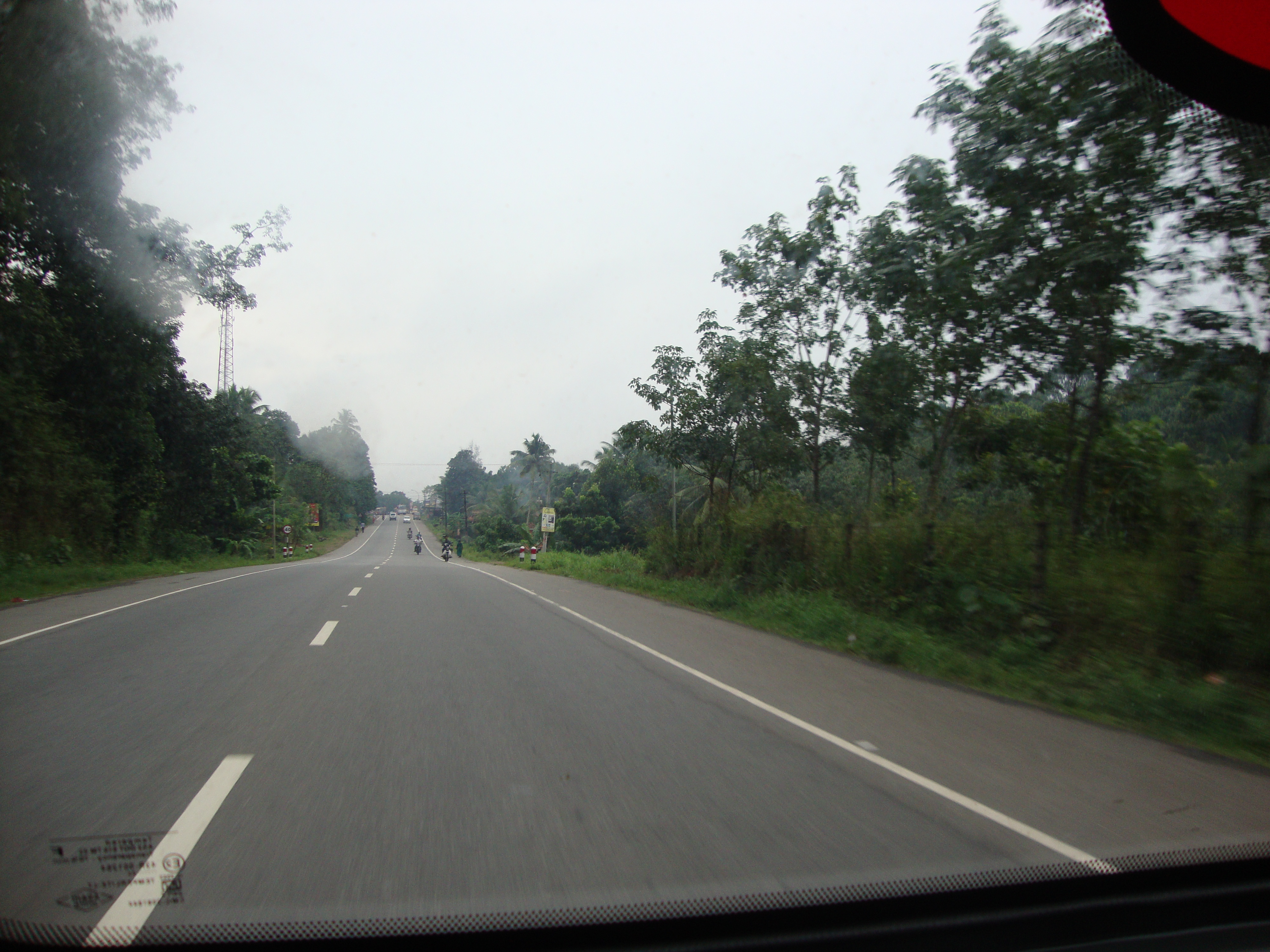
Main Central Road near Chengannur

Main Central Road is the arterial State Highway in the Travancore region of Kerala state. It is designated as SH 1 by the Kerala Public Works Department. It passes through Chengannur town of Alappuzha district and helps it to connect with other parts of Kerala. State Highway 5 (Kerala) is another State Highway that starts in Kayamkulam and ends at Pulimukku junction. The highway is 42.5 km long. State Highway 6 (Kerala) starts in Kayamkulam and ends in Thiruvalla. This highway has 30.8 km length. State Highway 10 (Kerala) is a State Highway that starts in Mavelikkara and ends in Kozhencherry. The highway is 28.7 km long. State Highway 12 (Kerala) that starts in Ambalappuzha and ends in Thiruvalla and has 27.2 km length.

==== Vehicle registration ====
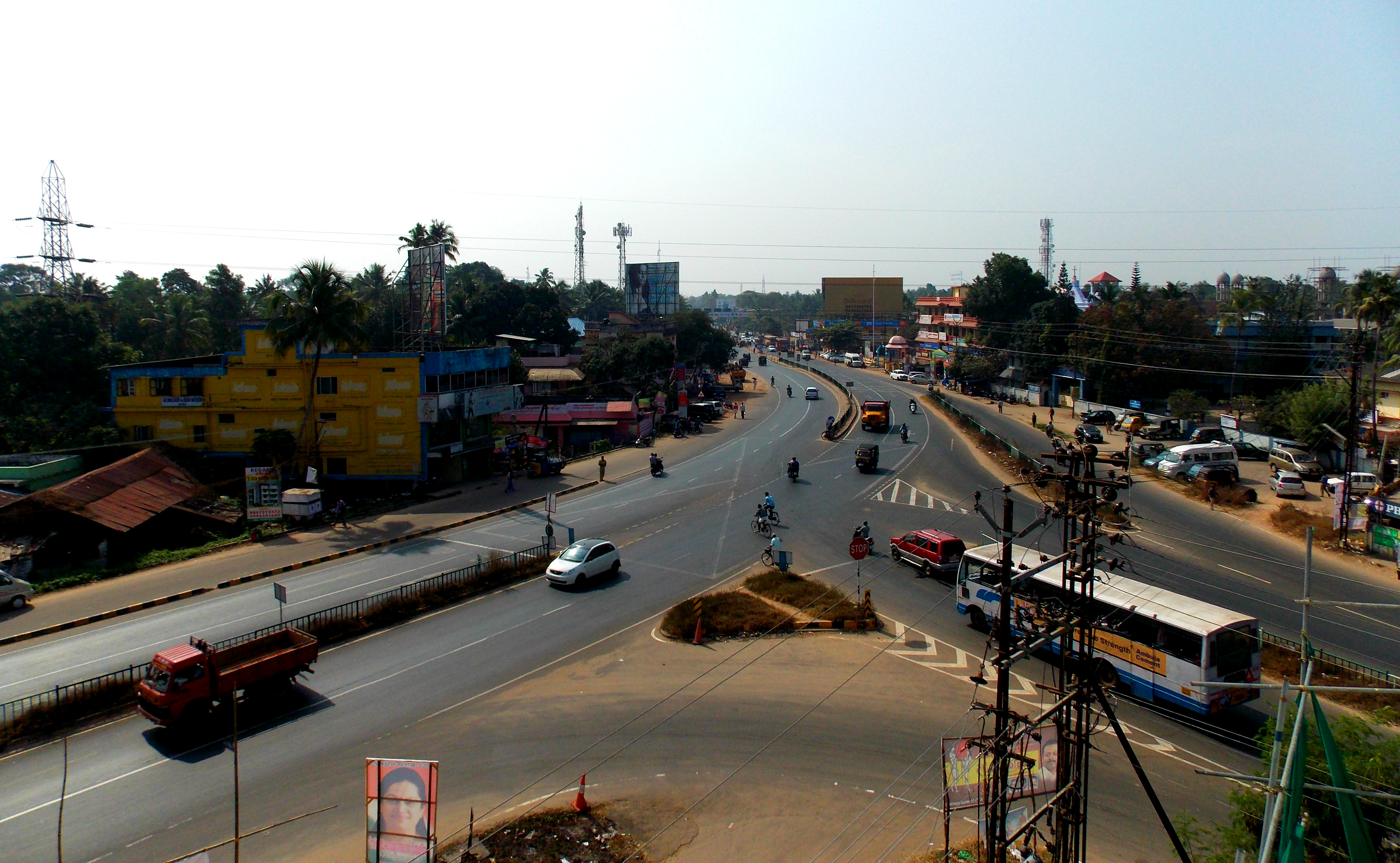
Aroor bypass

Following are the vehicle registrations in Alappuzha District:

- KL-04: Alappuzha RTO (Ambalappuzha Taluk)
- KL-29: Kayamkulam SRTO (Karthikappally Taluk)
- KL-30: Chengannur SRTO (Chengannur Taluk)
- KL-31: Mavelikkara SRTO (Mavelikkara Taluk)
- KL-32: Cherthala SRTO (Cherthala Taluk)
- KL-66: Kuttanad SRTO (Kuttanad Taluk)
- SRTO (HARIPPAD)KL 88

Old structure:- Following are the old registration numbers in Alappuzha District:-

- KLA
- KLY
- KRA
- KRY

=== Water ===
Because of the abundance of waterways, boats and ferries are integral to the transportation system in Alappuzha. National Waterway 3 also passes through the area. There is an SWTD boat jetty in the city that lies opposite to the KSRTC bus stand. It is served by boat services to towns like Kottayam, Kollam and Changanassery besides to other small towns and jetties.

=== Rail ===
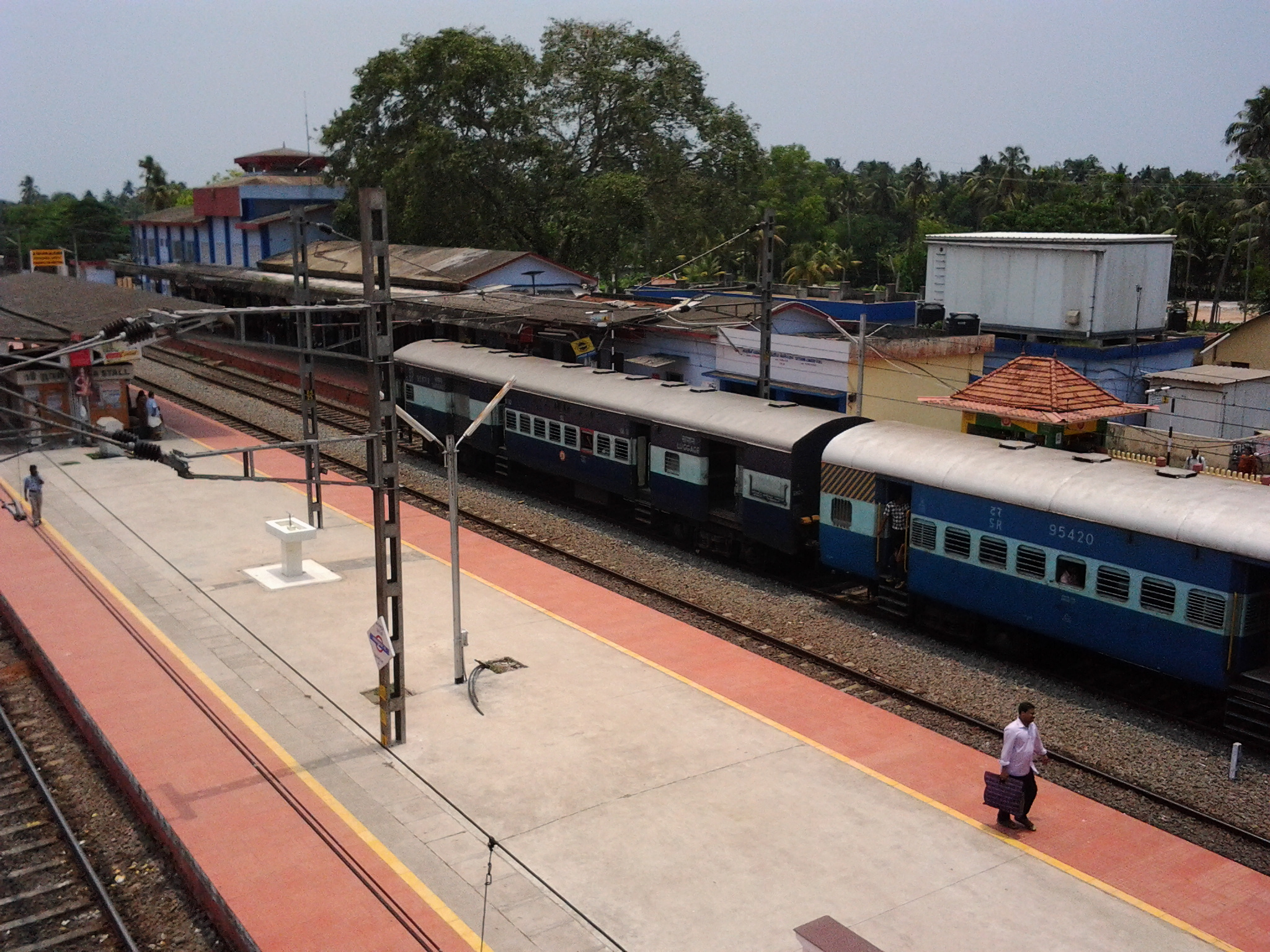
Kayamkulam Junction railway station

Alappuzha district has two railway lines. Ernakulam–Kayamkulam coastal railway line primarily links with Haripad railway station, Alappuzha railway station, Cherthala railway station and Kayamkulam Junction railway station, Whereas Ernakulam-Kottayam-Kollam line connects the eastern region of district and that is Chengannur railway station and Mavelikara railway station.

=== Air ===
The city is accessible by air, rail, road and water. Cochin International Airport, which is 78 kilometres (48 mi) to the North, is the closest airport. Thiruvananthapuram International Airport, 159 kilometres (99 mi) to the South, is the other airport that links the district with other countries. International tourists use this facility to reach Alappuzha. The other nearest airports are at Kozhikode (236 kilometres (147 mi)) and Coimbatore (254 kilometres (158 mi)). A helipad in the city is reserved for government uses.

== Culture ==
Snake boat races are the most significant traditional event in Alleppey. These regattas are usually held between August and October, and involve long thin boats powered by up to 120 oarsmen. One such snake boat race is the Nehru Trophy Boat Race.

Chemmeen was filmed in two villages in Alappuzha. In the opening credits, a written statement in Malayalam thanks the people of both villages.

=== Tourism ===
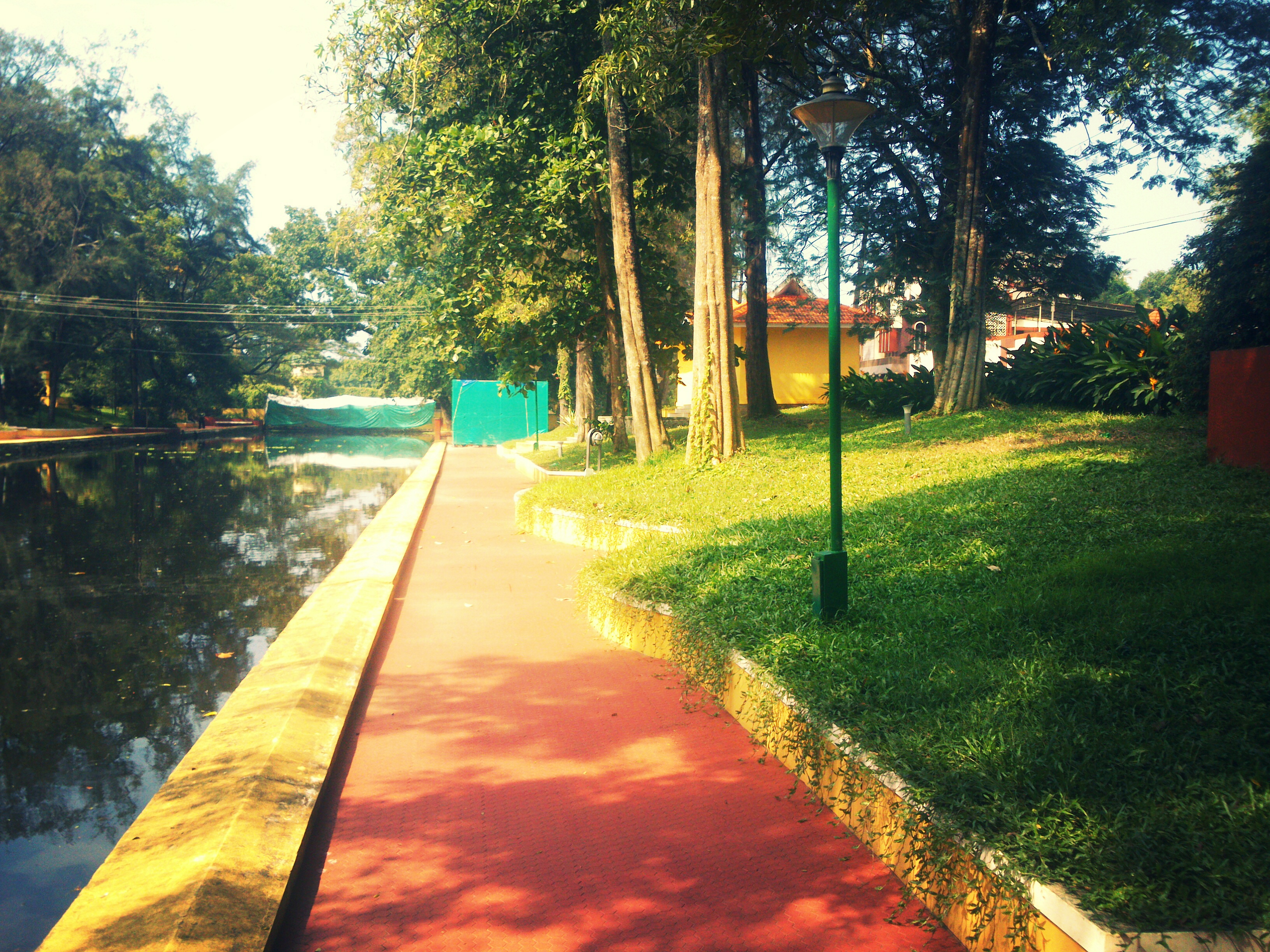
Commercial canal walkway in Alleppey west

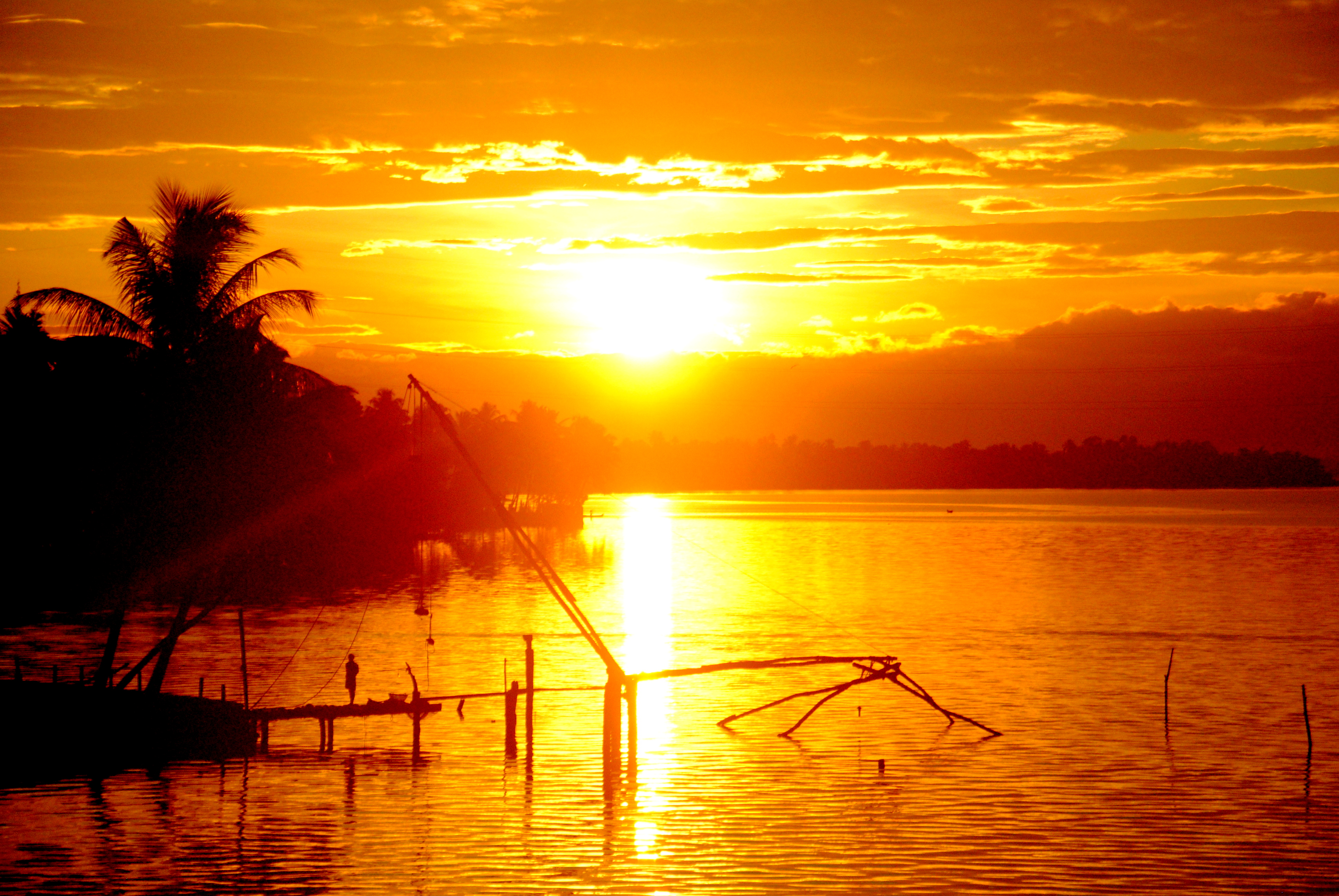
A sunrise from the Aroor bridge

The name Alappuzha is derived from Aal (Sea)+ puzha (River-mouth) ("The joining place of a river and the sea") (Malayalam). Alappuzha is one of the most important tourist centres in the state, with a large network of inland canals, earning it the sobriquet "Venice of the East". These large networks of canals are Alleppey's lifeline. Alappuzha was one of the busiest centers of trade in the past, with one of the best-known ports along the Malabar coast. Even today it retains its charm as the center for the Coir carpet industry and prawn farming.

Alappuzha, the ideal headquarters for backwater tourism, as well as for visits to the church-filled town of Kottayam and the town of Aranmula, which are known for their historic annual Aranmula Snake Boat Race. Chengannur, in Alappuzha, is the nearest railway station to Sabarimala.

The Krishnapuram Palace is in Kayamkulam.

The Buddha idol and Saradha Mandiram are the main attractions of Mavelikkara. The Buddha statue is in a seated posture, resembling Padmasana. A feature common to the idols is that hair has not been engraved on the head. Studies by the archaeology department have not been able to explain the absence of hair, which is common to Buddha statues of the Gandhara and Mathura traditions. The head has markings resembling headgear. Although the department has made a pagoda-like structure for the statue, no information on the idol is available to tourists who visit the area. Local people in the area light lamps before the idol. The idol at Mavelikara is 4 feet (1.2 m) high and is perhaps the biggest. The engravings on the head resemble a helmet of Greek statues. The mark of a sacred thread is visible on the body. Another feature is the marking of a shawl on one shoulder. Here the archaeological department has put up a sign specifying the age of the statue. Saradha Mandiram was the residence of Kerala Panini.

Alappuzha is also known for its snake-boat races held on the second Saturday of August, every year. This competition; the Nehru boat race takes its name from India's first prime minister Jawaharlal Nehru, which was inaugurated in 1952. It is excitement all around as snake-boats, each manned by over a hundred oarsmen, cut through the waters like wind.

The Revi Karunakaran Memorial Museum features displays of art and artifacts. Revi Karunakaran was the architect of a modernized Coir industry that still employs more than 500,000 people in the state of Kerala. The objects displayed at the Museum were collected by his family over three generations and feature unique artistic pieces from all parts of the world.

Alappuzha, the district headquarters, is a town with picturesque canals, backwaters and lagoons, was described as the "Venice of the East" by Lord Curzon.

=== Festivals ===
Chettikulangara Bharani is the most important festival in Alappuzha district. The festival is one among the important temple festivals of Kerala. A Chettikulagara Bhagavathi Temple, a temple dedicated to the Goddess Bhagavathi is about four kilometers from Mavelikkara and six kilometers from kayamkulam. The festival occurs on the Bharani asterism in February/March. The main rituals of the festival are the 'Kuthiyottam' and 'Kettukazcha'. The 'Kuthiyottam' features a procession of young boys who have observed rigorous ritual penance. Traditional drums, music and glittering ornamental parasols accompany this procession of boys who dance in a trance.

The St. Andrew's Basilica, Arthunkal & St. Thomas Church, Thumpoly in Alappuzha District is noted for the annual feast, popularly known as Arthunkal Perunnal, Thumpoly Perunnal (perunnal means feast). The feast is held in December & January every year.

'Chirappu Mahotsavam' is an important occasion at Mullakkal Rajarajeswari Temple in December. Christmas comes in between the festival and Alappuzha town is a busy place at the time. The streets are full of wandering markets and entertainment ventures like circuses and exhibitions. The streets are crowded throughout the month and there is a 'Shiveli' or the display of nine Tuskers accompanied by the 'Chenda' and the 'Panchavadyam' music.

Padanilam Sivarathri is another important religious event in Alappuzha district. This festival is held every year in the Padanilam Parabrahma Temple. The temple is situated in the small town of Padanilam. Padanilam is situated 'about 16 km from Mavelikkara town.

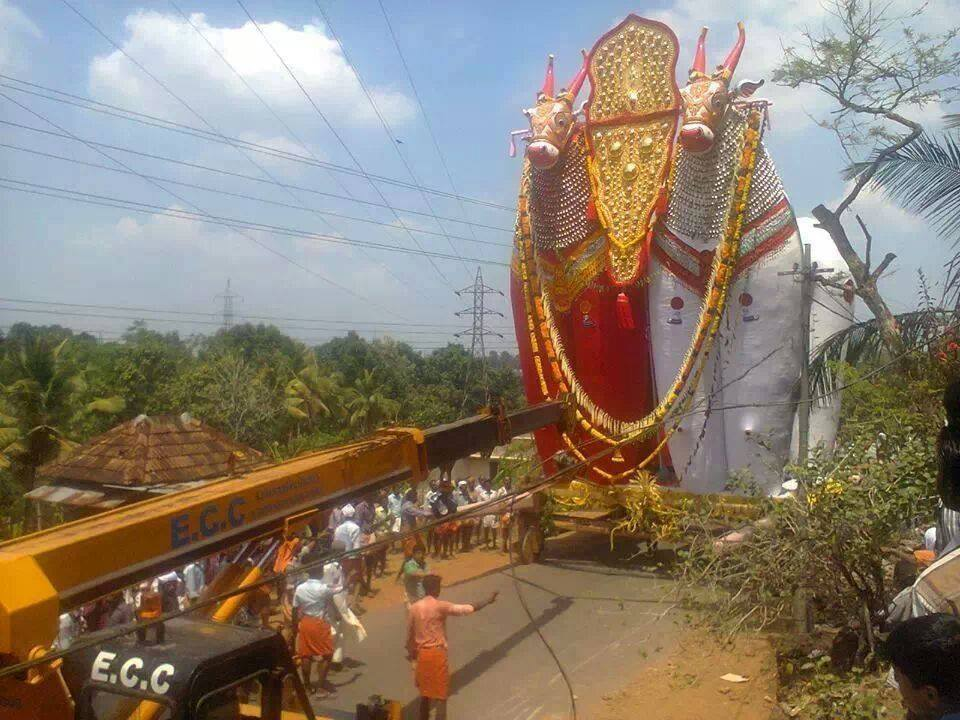
Nooranad Padanilam Sivarathri

A grand annual festival is celebrated at the unique Nagaraja Temple (Mannarasala Temple, Vettikodu Nagaraja Temple) in October/November. Another festival celebrated by the temple is a one-day Thaipooyan Kavadi. The Chandanakudam is celebrated at the Kidangam-Parampu Temple during December every year. Kottamkulangara Temple in Alappuzha has two festive seasons in February and March, because of the two deities with separate flag masts in the same compound wall.

The Kandamangalam Rajarajeshwari Temple is located in Kadakkarappally, Cherthala 1 km west of Thankey junction on NH 47. The annual festival comes in March–April. Chikkara, offering of children to the mother goddess during the festival, is the major attraction. The Chamanju Valathu of children starts on the 2nd day of the festival and lasts until the 8th day. Procession named Thalappoli start on the flag-hoisting day itself. The holy bath (Aarattu) of the goddess is held in a pool within the temple compound on the 10th day of festival. Elephant processions, fireworks, stage shows, etc. are major events that attract thousands of devotees and others.

The churches here celebrate grand annual feasts. The 'Arthunkal Perunnal' feast is celebrated at the Arthunkal Church. Also, the big major Christian feast are the feast's at Edathwa(Edathua) Church and Thumpoli Church Alappuzha, Pallipuram church cherthala. The regatta forms part of many festivals here in many places. The annual Vallam Kali (Nehru Trophy Boat Race) is held in the backwaters in the month of September associated with the Onam festival. The main attraction is the Chundan Vallam (Snake Boat) race, in which a number of contestants are in the running for the Prime Minister's trophy. Another celebration in Alappuzha is the "Beach Festival", held from 30 December to 2 January. The annual festival conducted in Champakulam "Valiya Palli" is another big festival.

== Education ==
=== Medical colleges ===
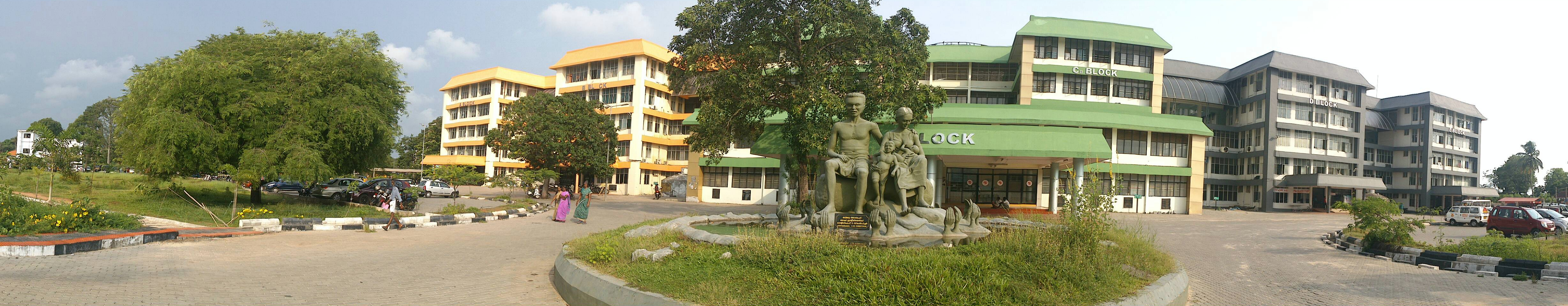
Government T D Medical College, Alappuzha

- Government T D Medical College, Alappuzha

==== Paramedical Colleges ====
- KVM Institute of Paramedical Science, Cherthala.

==== Nursing Colleges ====
- Government College of Nursing, Vandanam.
- KVM College of Nursing, Cherthala.

==== Arts and Science colleges ====
- Bishop Moore College, Mavelikkara
- Government Arts and Science College, Ambalappuzha
- Sree Ayyappa College, Eramallikkara
- Sree Narayana College, Chengannur
- Mar Gregorios College Punnapra
- MSM College, Kayamkulam
- N. S. S. College
- St. Aloysius College, Edathua
- St. Joseph's College for Women, Alappuzha
- St. Michael's College, Cherthala
- Sanatana Dharma College
- Sree Narayana College, Cherthala
- T. K. Madhava Memorial College

==== Engineering colleges ====
- Archana College of Engineering, Panamel, Alappuzha
- Carmel College of Engineering and Technology Alappuzha
- Cochin University College of Engineering, Kuttanad, Pulincunnoo, Alappuzha
- College of Engineering, Cherthala, Pallippuram, Alappuzha.
- College of Engineering, Chengannur, Alappuzha.
- College of Engineering and Management, Punnapra
- K. R. Gouri Amma College of Engineering for Women, Cherthala, Alappuzha
- Mount Zion College of Engineering for Women, Kozhuvalloor, Chengannur, Alappuzha.
- Providence College Of Engineering, Chengannur
- Sree Buddha College of Engineering, Nooranadu, Pattoor P O, Padanilam, Alappuzha
- Sree Vellappally Natesan College of Engineering, kayamkulam, Alappuzha
- University Institute of Technology (UIT), Alappuzha

=== Schools ===
- A.G.R.M. Higher Secondary School, Vallikunnam
- Aiswarya Pradayini LPUPS, Ramapuram
- Al-Ameen Public School, Chandiroor (northern Alappuzha district)
- Aravukad Higher Secondary School, Punnapra
- Aryakkara Bhagavathi Vilasam Higher Secondary School, Muhamma
- Bishop Moore Vidyapith, Cherthala
- Carmel Academy English Medium Higher Secondary School, Pazhavangady
- Carmel International School, Punnapra
- Carmel Polytechnic College, Punnapra
- Gayathri Junior School, Mannancherry
- Georgian Public School and Junior College, Edathua
- Government UP School, Erickavu
- Government Boys Higher Secondary School, Kaymkulam
- Government Sanskrit High School, Charamangalam, Muhamma
- Higher Secondary school, VHSE and Girls High Schools, Kanichukulangara Devaswom, Kanichukulangara
- Holy Family Higher Secondary School, Kattoor
- St. Thomas High School, Thumpoly.
- K.K.K.V.M. Higher Secondary School, Ananthapuram, Haripad
- Krist King High School, Cheppadu
- Kalavoor Government High School
- Leo XIII English Medium Central School, Kalath
- Leo XIII Higher Secondary School
- Lourdes Matha Higher Secondary School, Pacha, Edathua
- Mahakavi Kumaran Asan Memorial Higher Secondary School, Pallana
- MGM (Mar Gregorius Memorial) Central School, Karuvatta, is a CBSE School in Karthikappally taluk
- Matha Senior Secondary School, Thumpoly
- Morning Star English Medium School, Convent Sq.
- Naga Raja Vilasam Upper School (N.R.V.U.P.S.), Vetticode
- Padanilam Higher Secondary School, Padanilam P.O., Nooranad
- Panchayath High School, Pathiyoor
- Pope Pious XI Higher Secondary School, Kattanam
- St. Aloysius Higher Secondary School, Edathua
- St. Thomas High School, Karthikappally
- SDV (Sanatana Dharma Vidyasala) Boys High School
- SDV Boys Higher Secondary School
- SDV English Medium Higher Secondary School
- SDV Girls High School
- S.N.D.P. (Sree Narayana Dharma Paripalana) High School, Mahadevikadu
- S.N.L.P. School, Ambalappuzha
- Sree Sankara English Medium CBSE School, Kuruppamkulangara, Cherthala
- St.Mary’s Residential Central School, Alappuzha
- V.V. Higher Secondary School, Thamarakulam

== Notable people ==
V. S. Achuthanandan Former Chief Minister of Kerala.

- A. K. Antony
- A. M. Ariff
- A. V. Thamarakshan
- Abey Kuruvilla
- Arattupuzha Velayudha Panicker
- Ashokan
- Ayyappa Paniker
- Balachandra Menon
- Baselios Marthoma Didymos I
- Beeyar Prasad
- Bhima Bhattar
- C. M. Stephen
- C. T. Ravikumar
- Chelangatt Gopalakrishnan
- Chenganoor Raman Pillai
- Dulquer Salmaan
- Eleanour Sinclair Rohde
- Erickavu N. Sunil
- Fahadh Faasil
- Farhaan Faasil
- Faazil
- G. Sudhakaran
- Gauthami Nair
- Gayatri Arun
- I. C. Chacko
- Itty Achudan
- J. Sasikumar
- James Kalacherry
- Jomon T. John
- Joy J. Kaimaparamban
- K. Madhu
- K. Shankar Pillai
- K. M. Cherian
- K. M. Mathew
- K. M. Panikkar
- K. P. Appan
- K. P. Sasidharan
- K. P. A. C. Lalitha
- K. R. Gouri Amma
- K. S. Manoj
- Karunakara Guru
- Kavalam Narayana Panicker
- Kavalam Sreekumar
- Kayamkulam Kochunni
- Kunchacko
- Kunchako Boban
- Kuriakose Elias Chavara
- Lopamudra R.
- M. G. Radhakrishnan
- M. G. Sreekumar
- Madhu Muttom
- Mallika Sukumaran
- Mammootty
- Manu S. Pillai
- Maqbool Salmaan
- Mavelikkara Prabhakara Varma
- Mavelikkara Velukkutty Nair
- Minon
- Muthukulam Raghavan Pillai
- Nagavally R. S. Kurup
- Narendra Prasad
- Navodaya Appachan
- Navya Nair
- Nedumudi Venu
- P. Parameswaran
- P. C. Alexander
- P. S. Sreedharan Pillai
- Padmarajan
- Palani Subramaniam Pillai
- Pallithanam Luca Matthai
- Parappurath
- Prakash Varma
- Prasanth Parameswaran
- Rajan P. Dev
- Ramesh Chennithala
- Ratheesh
- Riaz M. T.
- Rupesh Paul
- S. Ramachandran Pillai
- Saranya Mohan
- Saranya Ponvannan
- Sebastian Xavier
- Shanimol Usman
- Sibi Malayil
- Sreekumaran Thampi
- Sukumara Kurup
- T. J. Anjalose
- T. K. Madhavan
- T. M. Thomas Isaac
- Thakazhi Sivasankara Pillai
- Thomas Chandy
- Thomas Kurialacherry
- Thoppil Bhasi
- V. S. Achuthanandan
- Vayalar Ramavarma
- Vayalar Ravi
- Vayalar Sarath Chandra Varma
- Vidya Pradeep
- Vinayan

== Photo gallery ==
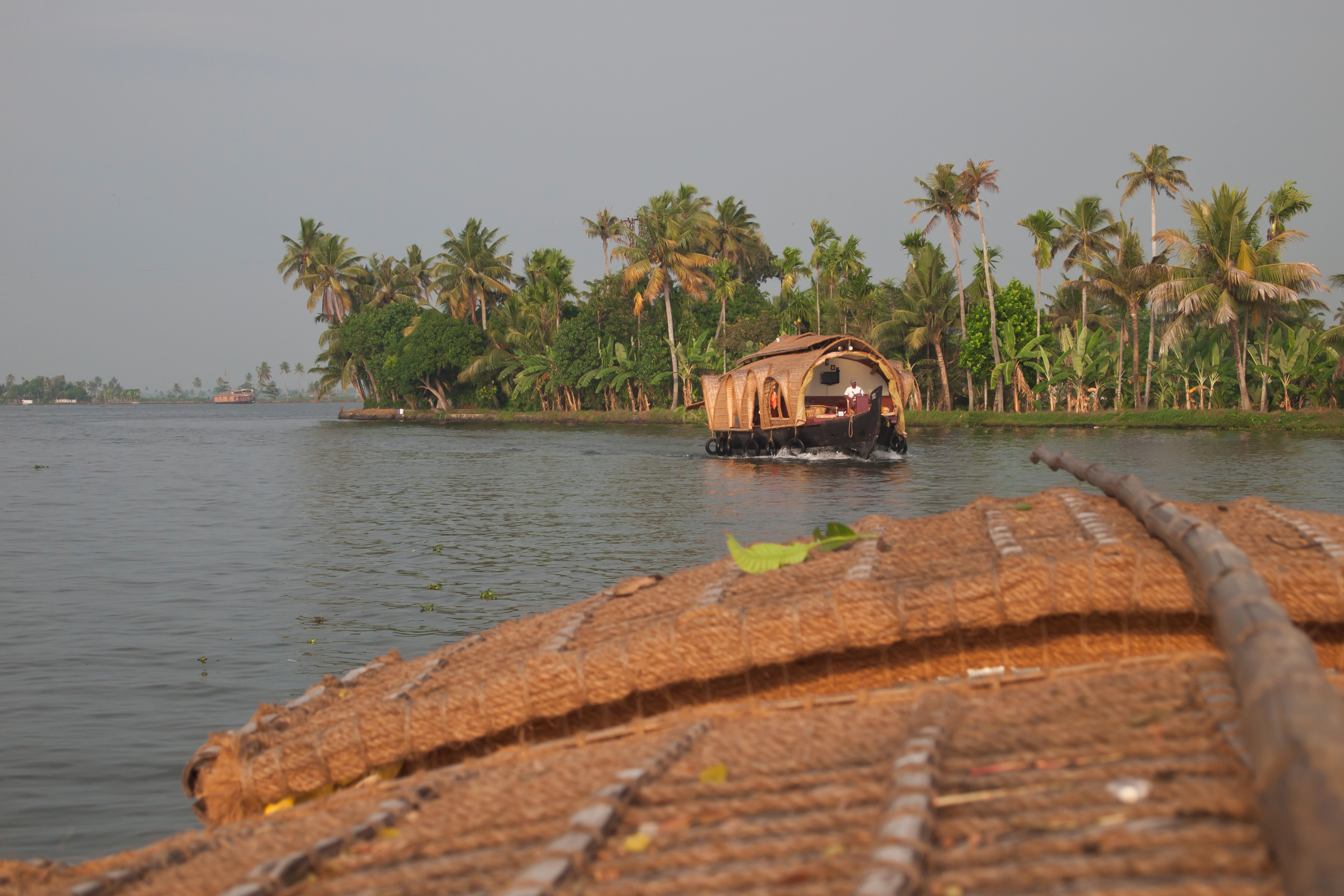
Houseboats on Vambanad Lake

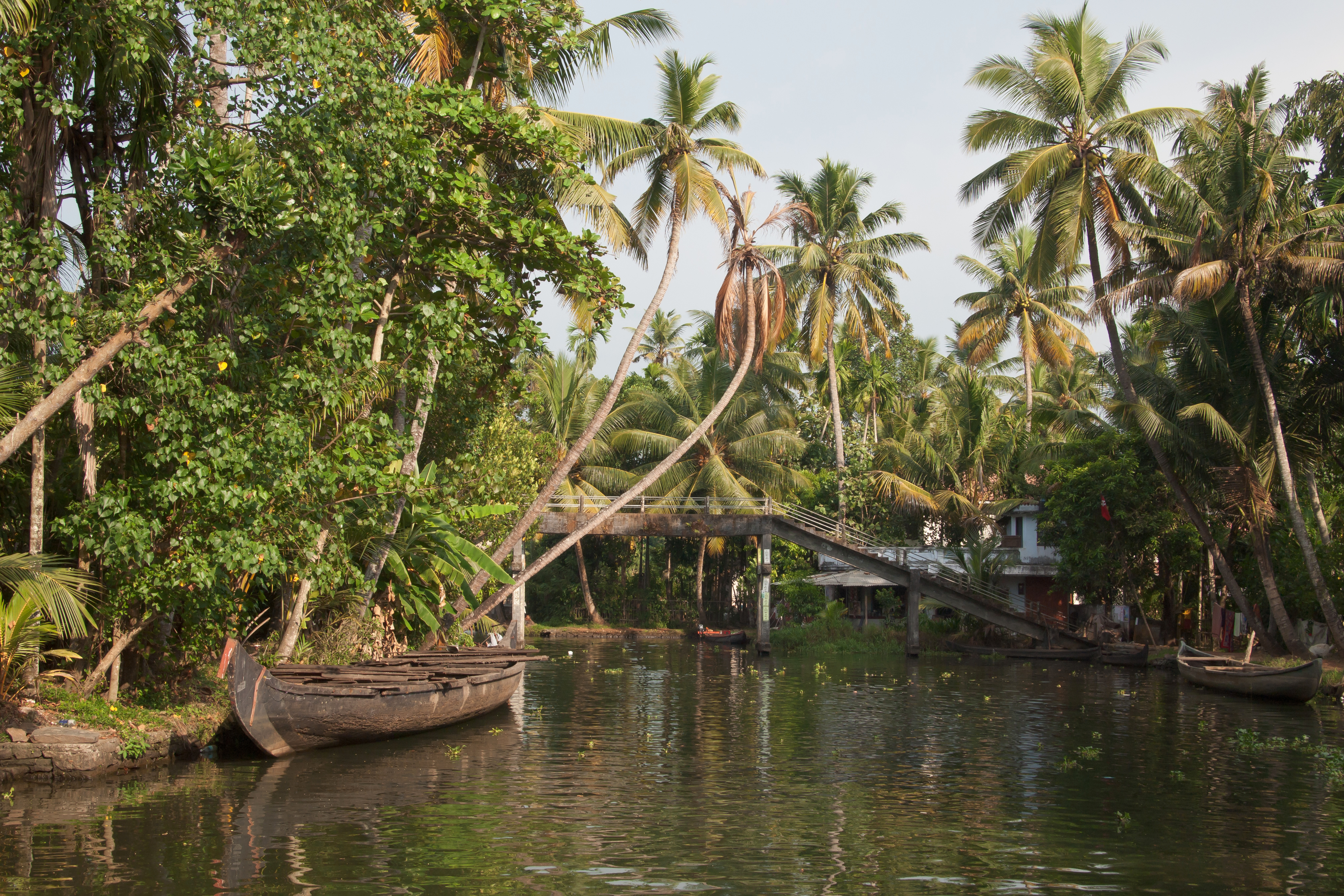
Backwaters in Alappuzha.

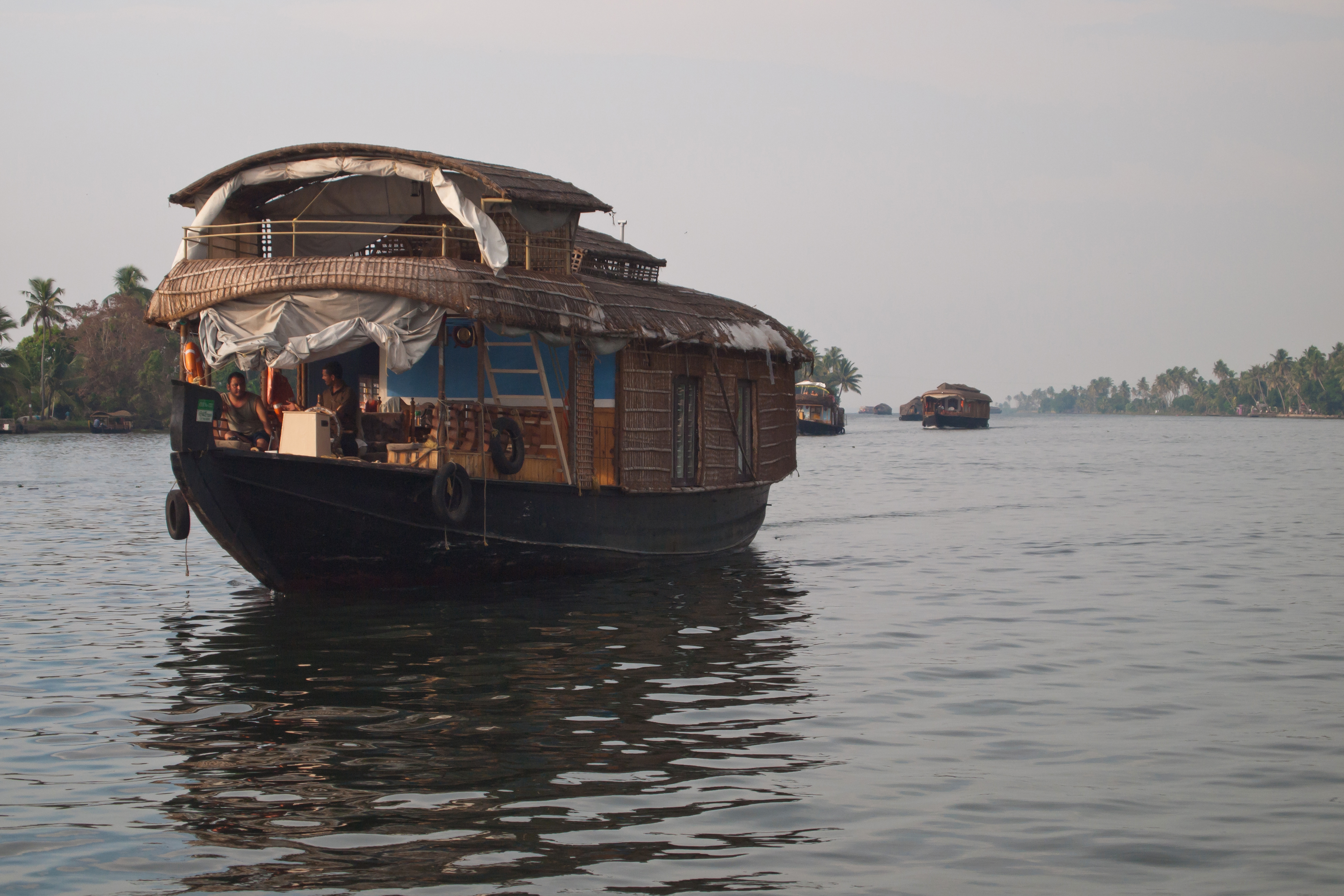
Houseboat in Alappuzha

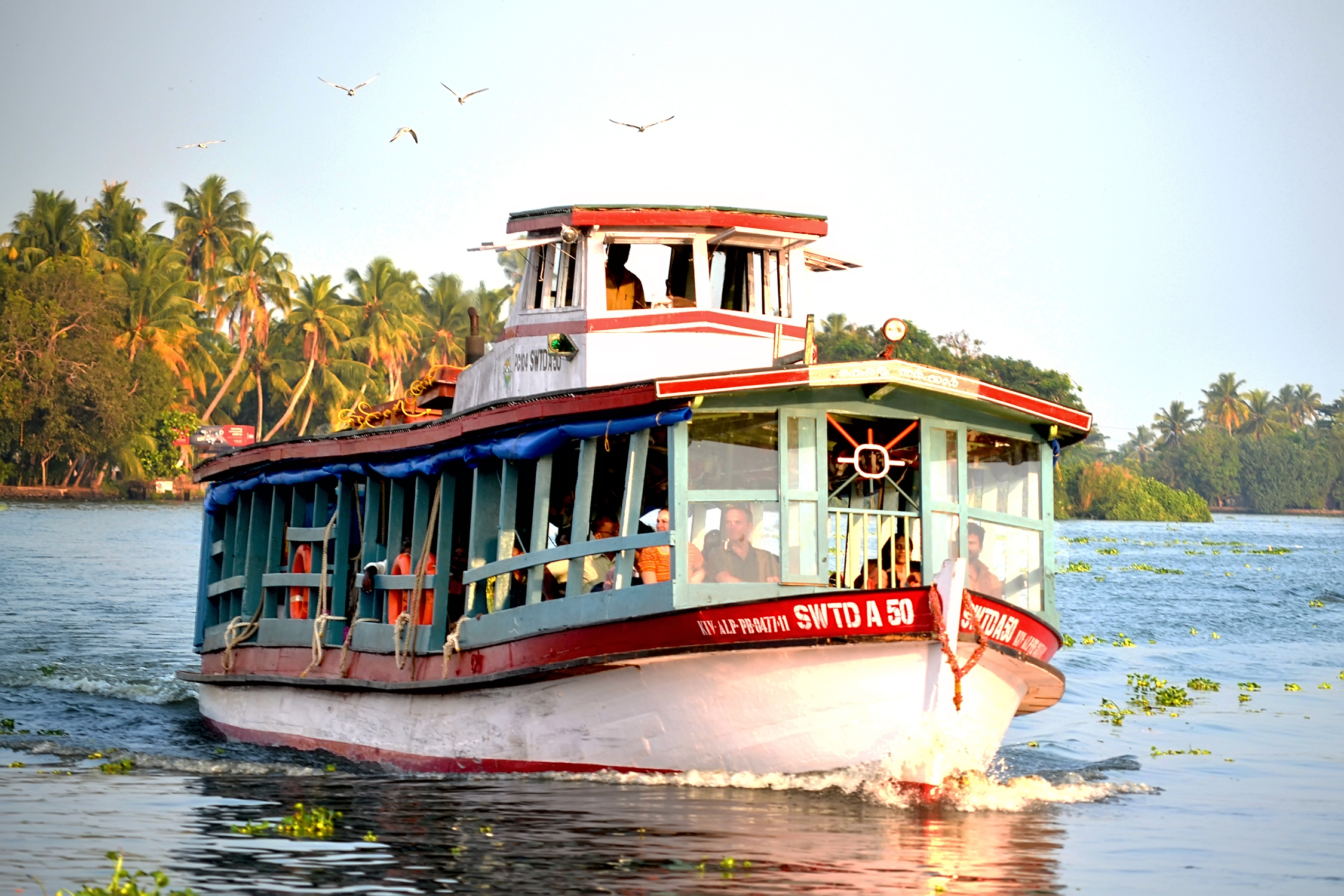
Public Transport Boat service in Kerala.

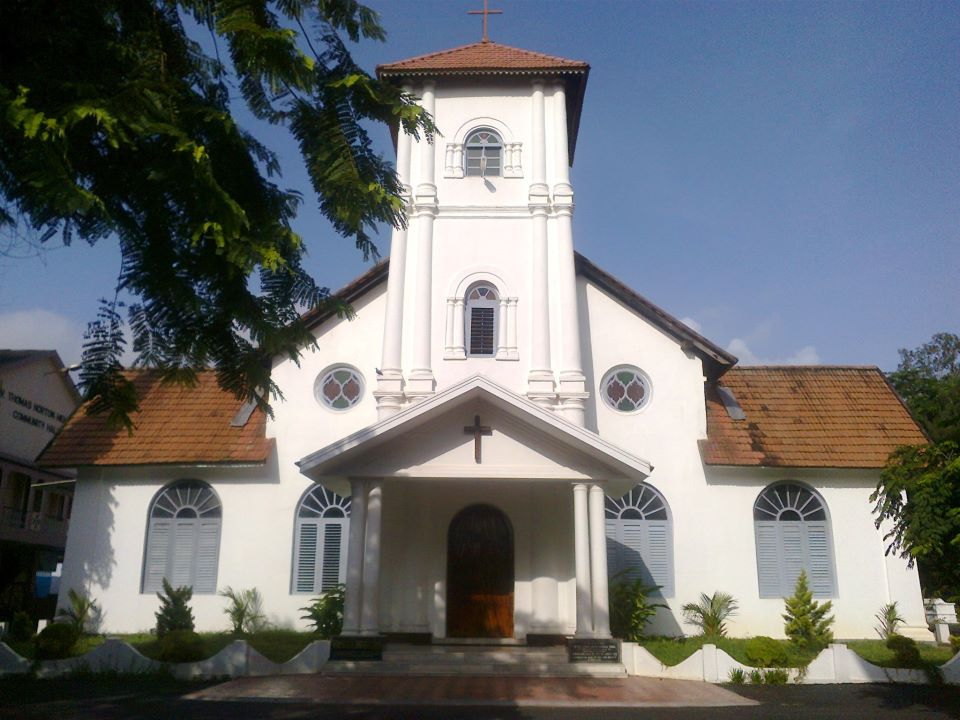
CSI Christ Church, Alappuzha

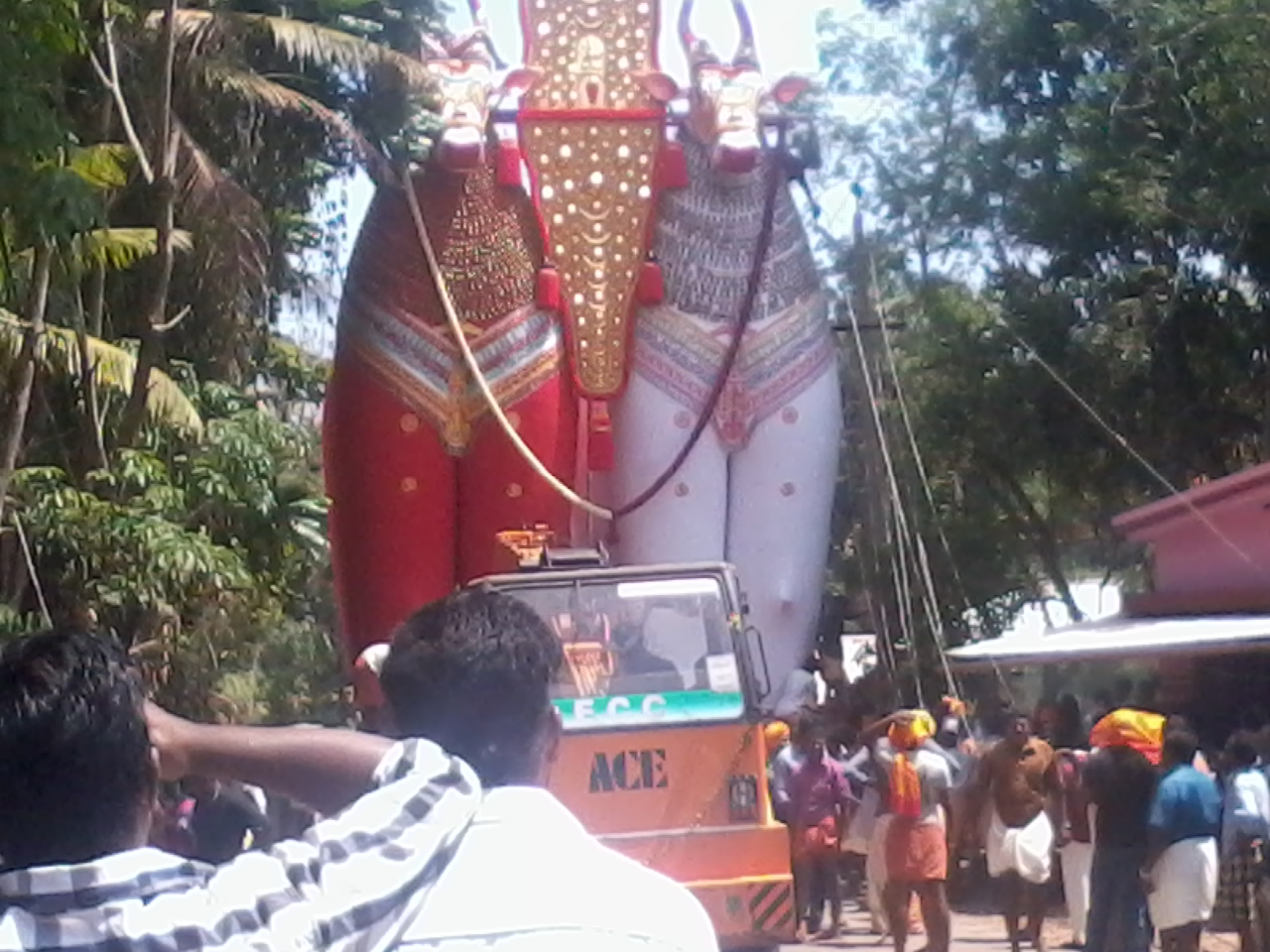
Nooranad Padanilam Sivarathri.

== Towns and villages ==
- Cherthala North
- Kurattikkadu
- Mazhukeer
- Padanilam
- Pathiyankara
- Poomala Chaal
- Vettakkal
- Punnapra

== See also ==
- Administration of Alappuzha district
- Kottayam district
- Chengannur
