= Cherthala North =

- Village
- Location within Kerala
- Coordinates: 9.675°N 76.31°E
- Country: India
- State: Kerala
- District: Alappuzha

Population (2011)
  - Total: 15,922
- Time zone: UTC+5:30 (IST)

Cherthala North is a village in Alappuzha district in the Indian state of Kerala.

== Demographics ==
As of 2011 India census, Cherthala North had a population of 13945 with 6860 males and 7085 females.
