= Perungala =

- village
- Location in Kerala, India Perungala (India)
- Coordinates: 9°10′35″N 76°31′40″E
- Country: India
- State: Kerala
- District: Alappuzha

Population (2011)
  - Total: 14,151

Languages
  - Official: Malayalam, English
- Time zone: UTC+5:30 (IST)

Perungala is a village in Alappuzha district in the Indian state of Kerala.

== Demographics ==
As of 2011 India census, Perungala had a population of 14,151 with 6,430 males and 7,721 females. The CPI(M) party is very strong in this area.
