= Poomala Chaal =

Village in Alappuzha District, Kerala, India

Poomala Chaal is a small village situated about 3 kilometres (1.9 mi) from Chengannur in Alappuzha district, Kerala, India. Poomala Chaal is noted for its natural lotus lake and Malayil Palli (an ancient church founded by St. Gregorios of Parumala).
