= Sriram Venkitaraman =

Civil servant from Kerala, India (born 1986)

Personal details
- Born: 28 November 1986 (age 39) Panampilly Nagar, Kochi, Kerala, India
- Spouse: Renu Raj (m. 2022)
- Education: Bachelor of Medicine, Bachelor of Surgery; Master of Public Health
- Alma mater: Government Medical College, Thiruvananthapuram; Harvard University, Massachusetts
- Profession: Civil servant; Medical doctor
- Known for: Former Sub-Collector of Devikulam

Sriram Venkitaraman (born 28 November 1986) is an IAS officer and a medical doctor from Kerala. He is a former sub-collector of Devikulam and former collector of Alappuzha district for a very short term.

== Early life and education ==
Sriram Venkitaraman was born on 28 November 1986 in Panampilly Nagar, Kochi, Kerala, to a Tamil father P. R. Venkitaraman, a retired zoology professor and a career consultant, and mother Rajam, a State Bank of India employee. He completed his school education at Bhavan's Vidya Mandir-Girinagar in 2004, obtained his M.B.B.S from the Government Medical College, Thiruvananthapuram in 2010, and joined for M.D. in General Medicine from Srirama Chandra Bhanja Medical College and Hospital, Cuttack, later dropped out to pursure Civil Service. He passed the Indian Civil Service Examination in his second attempt in 2012. He later pursued an MPH from Harvard University with a Fulbright scholarship.

== Career ==
While Sriram was the sub-collector of Devikulam, he oversaw the demolition of 92 illegally constructed buildings in Munnar and served notices to about 100 resorts and unauthorized constructions at the ecologically sensitive villages in Devikulam taluk. During his tenure, the revenue department took over the Lovedale homestay in Munnar and converted it into the Munnar village office.

== Homicide Case ==
On 3 August 2019, just two days after Sriram was appointed as the Director of Land Survey Department, he was suspended from government service due to his involvement in a drunken driving car crash that resulted in the death of a senior Kerala journalist K. M. Basheer.

Sriram and his friend Wafa Firoz were travelling in a Volkswagen Vento owned by Wafa, when he lost control over the wheels and hit Basheer near Museum Road. Though his co-passenger said she was driving the car, eyewitnesses stated otherwise.

He was suspended for six months and in March 2020, he was reinstated into the Health Department amidst protests by Basheer's family and became Joint Secretary in the Department of Health and Social Justice.

Later he was appointed as District Collector of Alappuzha district. Though Pinarayi Vijayan, chief minister of Kerala justified the reinstating as a part of the process several organizations like Kerala Union of Working Journalists protested following which he was transferred to the post of General manager Kerala State Civil Supplies Corporation on 1 August 2022.
