= Kurattissery =

- village
- Location in Kerala, India Kurattissery (India)
- Coordinates: 9°18′0″N 76°31′0″E
- Country: India
- State: Kerala
- District: Alappuzha

Population (2011)
  - Total: 11,849

Languages
  - Official: Malayalam, English
- Time zone: UTC+5:30 (IST)

Kurattissery is a village in the Alappuzha district in the Indian state of Kerala.

== Demographics ==
At the 2011 India census, Kurattissery had a population of 11,849 with 5,562 males and 6,287 females.
