= Ennakkad =

- village
- Location in Kerala, India Ennakkad (India)
- Coordinates: 9°17′0″N 76°33′0″E
- Country: India
- State: Kerala
- District: Alappuzha

Population (2011)
  - Total: 18,444

Languages
  - Official: Malayalam, English
- Time zone: UTC+5:30 (IST)
- PIN: 689624
- Vehicle registration: KL30
- Nearest city: Chengannur
- Lok Sabha constituency: Mavelikkara
- Vidhan Sabha constituency: Chengannur
- Climate: MIXED (Köppen)

Ennakkad is a ward in Budhanoor Grama Panchayat, Alappuzha district in the Indian state of Kerala.

== Location ==
Ennakkadu is surrounded by Chennithala, Gramam, Puliyoor, Mavelikkara, Budhanur and Mannar. Ennakkad has its own space in the history of Kerala and contributed significantly in the growth of Communism in Kerala. A heritage building in Ennakkadu is Ennakkadu palace.

== Worship centres in Ennakkad ==
=== St Michael's Church Ennakkad ===
St Michael's Church is famous worship centre in Ennakkad. It belongs to Lactin Catholic and the festival of celebration in April 17 to 21 every year. St Michael's church is located near Ennakkad junction and opposite of St Mary's Church.

=== Devi Temple ===
Ennakkadu Devi temple is very famous. The official name of Ennakkad Devi temple is Naluvila Devi Temple. This temple is a family trust now and is owned and managed by the elder members of Kaduvinal Family. This temple was built by Kaduvinal family members in their own land for their religious purpose. Kaduvinal family members were involved in various decision makings of the Temple Festivals. The temple festival is on "Bharani" Nakshathram in the Malayalam month of Meenam. Currently temple renovation is continuing and is managed by Kaduvinal Family with full cooperation and support from Devi's devotees. First phase of renovation is complete. All the Devi's devotees in Ennakkad extended their full support and cooperation to orazhama for the renovation phase I.

== History ==
A remote forested area lying east of Kuttamperoor, south of Budhanoor, west of Puliyoor, north of Mavelikara had wild animals and thick vegetation with tall wild trees.

Ennakkad as a human settlement, shown an urban characters in the past. Then there was a decline during 80s and 90s. Now again ennakkad is in the path of urbanism.

== Geography ==
The quarter is surrounded by a river, and green paddy fields. This village still have narrow pedestrian lines with full of shady trees leading to small jungle like" KAVU". All governing offices of Bhudhanoor panchayath like Panchayath office and Village offices are situated in Ennakkad.

== Demographics ==
As of 2011 India census, Ennakkad had a population of 18,444 with 8,710 males and 9,734 females.
