= Vettakkal =

- Village
- Location in Kerala, India Vettakkal (India)
- Coordinates: 9.727°N 76.300°E
- Country: India
- State: Kerala
- District: Alappuzha district

Government
  - MLA (2011-16): Mr. P Prasad (M.L.A Cherthala)
- Elevation: 0.6 m (2.0 ft)

Languages
  - Official: Malayalam,
- Time zone: UTC+5:30 (IST)
- PIN: 688529
- Telephone code: 0478
- Vehicle registration: KL-32 or KL-04
- Sex ratio: 1030 ♂/♀
- Parliament of India constituency: Alappuzha
- Legislative Assembly constituency: Cherthala

Vettakkal is a coastal village in Cherthala taluk of Alappuzha district in Kerala, India. Vettakkal is located approximately 5 km west of Cherthala town, and belongs to Pattanakkad Panchayath
