= Pazhaveedu =

Village in Alappuzha, Kerala, India

Pazhaveedu is a village in Alappuzha district in the state of Kerala, India. It is part of Alappuzha municipality.

This place is known for the Pazhaveedu Bhagavathi Temple and its Meena Bharani Festival. The presiding deity of this temple is goddess Bhadra Kaali. Muruga, Sasatha and Ganapathy are the main sub deities here. It is believed that "Mullakkal Bhagawathy" comes to this temple for the "Aarattu". This is a very old temple and exact date when it is built is unknown.

Pazhaveedu is one of the most sought after residential areas in Alappuzha.

The Vikas Nagar lane is home to many NRI families.
