= Mazhukeer =

- village
- Location in Kerala, India Mazhukeer (India)
- Coordinates: 9°20′40″N 76°35′40″E
- Country: India
- State: Kerala
- District: Alappuzha

Languages
  - Official: Malayalam, English
- Time zone: UTC+5:30 (IST)
- Telephone code: 2427
- Vehicle registration: KL-
- Coastline: 0 kilometres (0 mi)
- Nearest city: Chegannur, Thiruvalla
- Climate: Tropical monsoon (Köppen)
- Avg. summer temperature: 35 °C (95 °F)
- Avg. winter temperature: 20 °C (68 °F)

Mazhukeer is a village that lies in the Alappuzha district of Kerala in India. The village begins at Arattupuzha Bridge, which connects Pathanamthitta district and Allapuzha district and lies up to a church near Kallissery junction. The Varattar River is the eastern boundary of Mazhukeer. Mazhukeer is divided into two wards: Mel Mazukeer, or Mazukeermel (Upper Mazhukeer); and Keez Mazukeer, or Mazukeer (Lower Mazhukeer).
