= Pathiyankara =

Village in Alappuzha District, Kerala, India

Pathiyankara is a small village in Alappuzha district, Kerala, India.

Pathiyankara is close the Arabian Sea, where navigational lights were installed. Pathiyankara is about 1.25 nautical miles (2.32 km) from Thrikkunnapuzha village.

People of this village are engaged mostly in Coir fabric work and Fishing.

There are several Hindu temples in Pathiyankara; they include Mootheril Temple, Ammumma Nada Temple, Kaliyamma Temple And Muriyaalil Temple. A notable temple, the abode of Sree Dharmasastha, is located in Thrikkunnapuzha. There is also a mosque where hundreds of people come to pray.

Some part of Pathiyankara are islands. These islands are connected to the main land by a bridge across Kayamkulam Kayal. The main source of transportation is road ways and water ways.

The local Alappuzha district police use patrol boats, but one of their three boats was gutted in a 2016 fire, leaving them without a full compliment for years.
