= Kanjikuzhi (Alappuzha) =

Kanjikuzhi Kanjikuzhy
- Census Town
- Location in Kerala, India Kanjikuzhi (India)
- Coordinates: 9.6214°N 76.3348°E
- Country: India
- State: Kerala
- District: Alappuzha
- Taluk: Cherthala

Government
  - Type: Panchayati Raj (India)
  - Body: Kanjikuzhi Grama Panchayat

Area
  - Total: 12.86 km^{2} (4.97 sq mi)

Population (2011)
  - Total: 23,681
  - Density: 1,841/km^{2} (4,769/sq mi)

Languages
  - Official: Malayalam, English
- Time zone: UTC+5:30 (IST)
- PIN: 688539,688523,688582,688555
- Vehicle registration: KL-32

Kanjikuzhi is a census town and Panchayat in Alappuzha district in the state of Kerala, India. Kanjikuzhi is located 16 km (9.9 mi) north of the district headquarters Alappuzha and 7 km (4.3 mi) south of Cherthala. A hybrid type of long bean, Kanjikuzhy payar, is named after the town, where it was first developed by a local farmer.

== Demographics ==
As of the 2011 census, Kanjikuzhi had a population of 23,681 which constitutes 11,566 males and 12,115 females. Kanjikkuzhi census town has an area of 12.86 km^{2} (4.97 sq mi) with 6,017 families residing in it. The average sex ratio was 1047, lower than the state average of 1084. In Kanjikuzhi, 8.6% of the population was under 6 years of age. Kanjikkuzhi had an average literacy rate of 97.64%, higher than the state average of 94%: male literacy was 98.86% and female literacy was 96.46%.

== Administration ==
Kanjikkuzhi Gram Panchayat is a part of Kanjikkuzhi Block Panchayat. Kanjikkuzhi Panchayat is politically part of Cherthala (State Assembly constituency) under Alappuzha Lok Sabha constituency.
