= Adeela Abdulla =

Indian civil servant (born 1985)

- Born: 4 November 1985 (age 40); Kuttiady, Kerala, India
- Education: MBBS
- Occupations: Director, Agriculture Development and Farmers' Welfare Department . Former Fisheries, Government of Kerala, Director of Women and Child Development of Kerala, former Wayanad Collector, Alapuzha collector Former CEO Life Mission Kerala, Doctor
- Spouse: Rabeeh
- Children: 3

Adeela Abdulla is an Indian Administrative Service officer (Kerala cadre, 2012 batch) and the Director of the Agriculture Development and Farmers' Welfare Department. She was the former Director of the Women and Child Development Department and also served as the Gender Park CEO and State Lottery Department Director. She was the first CEO of Life Mission, a public housing mission in the state. She briefly held the additional charge of Registrar of Cooperative Societies. She was the first Muslim woman to pass the Civil Service Examination from Malabar (Kerala). Adeela was the Managing Director of Vizhinjam Port during the port's inauguration and when the first ship was berthed. She also handled the Kerala Solid Waste Management Project, an ADB-assisted project for waste management in the state.

== Early life ==
Adeela Abdulla was born to Abdulla and Biyyathu. She did her school education at Good Faith School Kuttyadi and MES Raja residential school Chathamangalam. She earned her MBBS from MES Medical College Perinthalmanna. As a medical doctor, she worked in the health centre at Agali, Mannarkkad. Adeela loves reading and is into creative writing. She is married to Dr Rabeeh, who is an infertility specialist and laparoscopy surgeon. They have three children Mariyam, Haezan and Husam.

== Career ==
After working as a Sub-Collector Trainee in Kannur District, she was appointed Sub-Collector of Tirur in Malappuram District and later Subcollector infortKochi.

=== Controversies ===
As the Fort Kochi sub-collector she acted against illegal encroachment worth Rs 60 crore in various parts of the city and began the process of eviction. She attracted the full attention of Kerala. She was transferred to Life Mission Kerala corporation and appointed CEO.

=== Awards ===
1. Finalist for Prime Minister's Award for Financial Inclusion.

2. MES Professional Award for Excellence in Professional Sphere
