= Nethyar Amma =

Nethyaramma (Malayalam: നേത്യാരമ്മ), transliterated variously, including Nethiar and Naittiyar, was the title of the consorts of the reigning Maharajas of Cochin and Zamorins of Calicut. It paralleled the style Ammachi Panapillai Amma in Travancore, and Kettilamma or Kovilamma elsewhere in Kerala. Nethiar was further employed by some elite naduvazhis, Moopil Nairs and families of similar ancestry and rank as the default title of all female members of the family, as was customary with the Kavalappara Nair, the Mannarghat Nair and the Ankarath.
