= Koothali Nair =

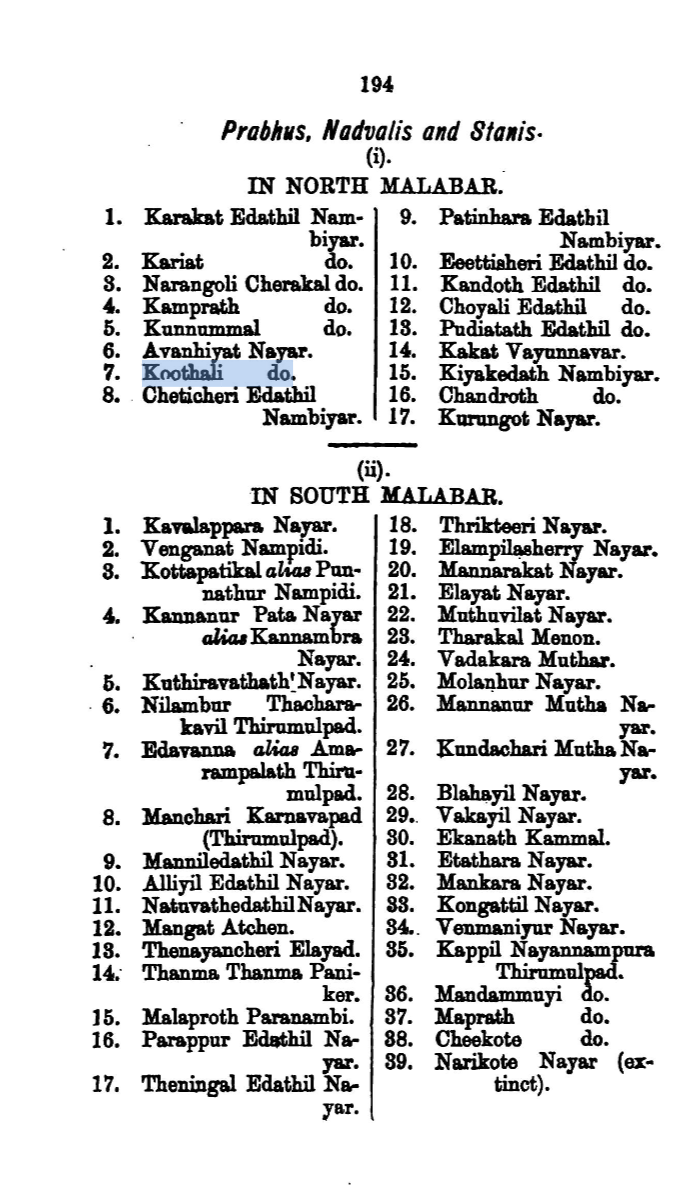

The Koothali (also spelt Kuttali, Kûtali, and Koodali) Moopil Nair or Moothavar, most commonly known as the Koothali Nair and styled Vallabhan Chathan, additionally known as the Koothali Payyormala Nayar and as Vazhunnavar, historically held and controlled an eponymous principality and sthanam of North Malabar, with his hereditary seat in Koothali. Towns and lands subject to the Koothali Moothavar's rule traditionally included Perambra, Changaroth, Cheruvannur, Kuttiady, and adjacent regions, including Kottathara. The Koothali Nair was traditionally one of Malabar's most prominent Naduvazhi, a Moopil Nair and Vazhunnavar, as well as a major Jenmimar, and held the Nair caste rank of Samantan and the family style of swaroopam.

== Origins ==
The Koothali succession descended matrilineally per Marumakkathayam through the aggregated family, known corporately as the Koothali Swaroopam, which formed originally as a thavazhi or kovilakom of the Ayinhat swaroopam, after an Ayinhat princess married the Raja of Kottayam, perhaps Pazhassi Raja.

Per the account, Lakshmi Kettillamma, the newlywed princess, passing through Kurumbala en route to the Ayinhat seat, observed along with her husband a series of strange omens featuring dogs and jackals. After reaching the Ayinhat palace, dreaming of the kuladevi, and consulting with priests, the Raja decided to give over to his wife and his future issue the tainted territories. His own family objects, but is outsmarted by the Ayinhat princess, who secures for her son, Ayinhat Nayar, vast demesnes of his own. The Kottayam Raja raised his son to the rank of Vazhunnavar and ceded to him from Kottayam's holdings the Kottathara and Kurumbala amsams, to be adjoined to Payyormala. Two Nayars - the Thenamangalath Nayar and the Poyil Nayar were appointed as lower nobility in service.

== Details ==
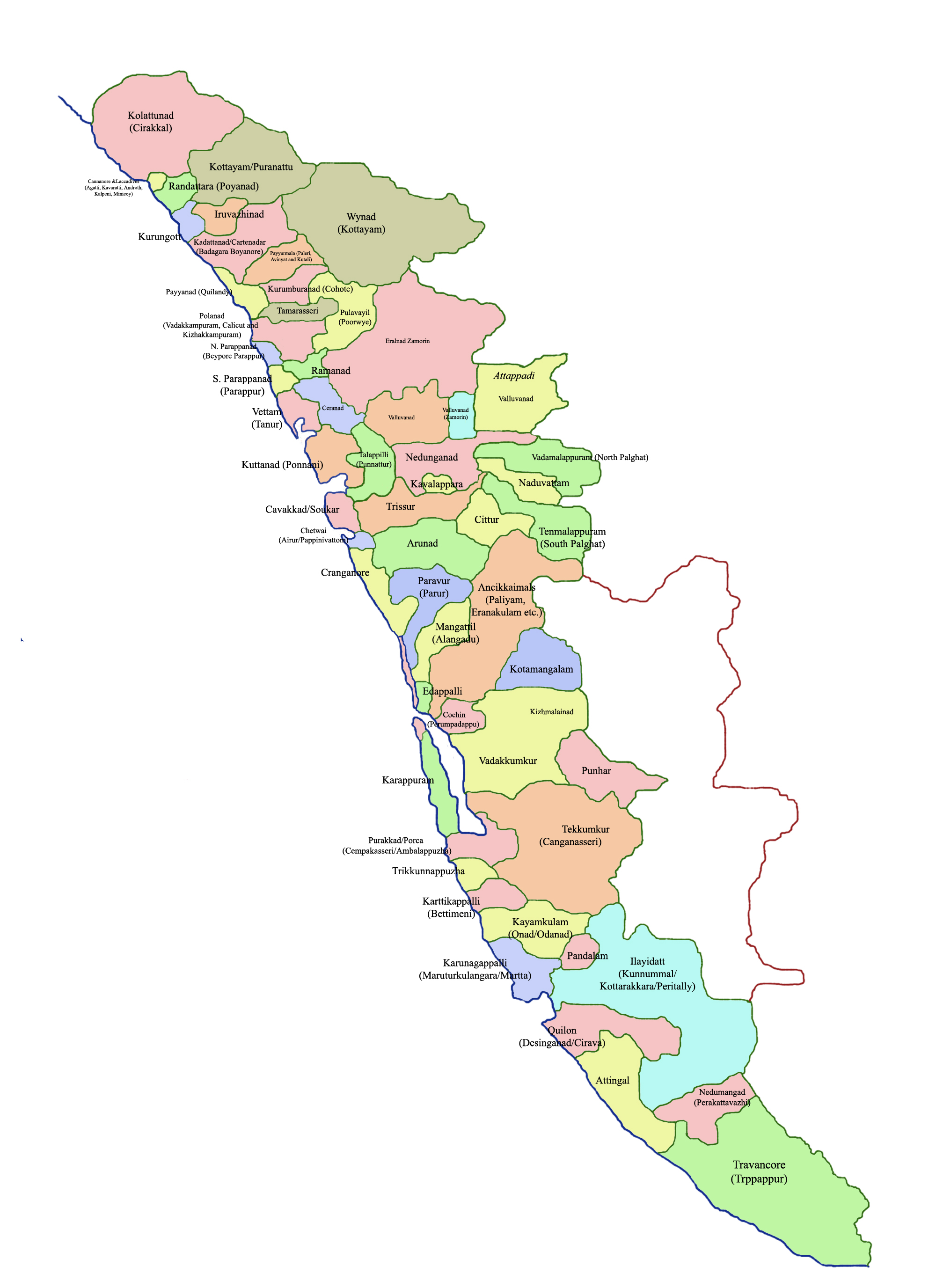
Payyormala as autonomous territories in the late Mediaeval period

By 1859, with the Paleri Nairs having gone extinct, the Koothali Nair, along with his Ayinhat cousin, were regionally second only in rank to the Porlathiri Raja of Kadathanadu, to which region Payyormala now belonged. Immediately beneath them in regional rank were Kadathanad nobles of the highest class: the Kurukkat Kurup, Pookote Nambiar, and Murchilotte Moopil Sthani (whence the Komath) ordered as the first three by precedence.

Under the British Raj the Koothali Nair, as ruler of a zamindari-type princely state was entitled to a malikhana, or Privy Purse, corresponding to one-fifth of the revenues from territories over which he had been mediatized from sovereignty, and paid land revenues of approximately 12,000 rupees.

Following the death of Kunhiraman, the last Koothali Moothavar, in 1936, the voluminous jenmi landholdings of the sthanam were extensively litigated and ultimately escheated to the state, beginning in 1939, and accounting for some 47,000 acres of diversely forested and agrarian lands, which were supervised by an appointed special tehsildar. During 1940s-era agitation echoing the Mappila Rebellion of 1921, peasant demands of the Karshaka Thozhilali Party included the expropriation of at least 16,000 acres or 20,000 acres of cultivable land from the estate to be repurposed for their use.

The final Koothali Nair Kunhiraman married the eldest daughter of Dewan Bahadur Dalawa Palakkal Ankarath Raman Menon, foundress of the Vengalil tharavadu. Their only child, a daughter, married the only son of the Porlathiri Raja of Kadathanadu, and his consort, the heiress of the Komath tharavad. V.K. Krishna Menon was the foremost of the children of the next generation.
