= Kavalappara Narayanan Nair =

Indian dancer

Kavalappara Narayanan Nair (1882–1948) was a prominent 20th-century Kathakali artiste and tutor who specialised in the Hanuman roles of the classical dance-drama from Kerala in south India.

A contemporary of greats like Pattikkamthodi Ravunni Menon and Guru Kunchu Kurup, Narayanan Nair also shone in virtuous slots like Bahukan and Brihannala, anti-hero roles like Shishupalan and Keechakan, grotesque characters like Raudra Bhiman and even minor roles like Mannaan, Aanakkaran, Narasimham, Bheeru and Yavanan. Narayanan Nair was the only northerner Kathakali artiste to figure on the regular pay rolls of the royal palace in Thiruvananthapuram.

His white-beard (vella thaadi) roles in the form of the monkey-god Hanuman gained him fame, and even inspired Malayalam poet Edasseri Govindan Nair to pen a poem titled "Lavanasuravadhathile Hanuman".

Narayanan Nair, a native of Kavalappara east of Shoranur in Palakkad district, was primarily trained under his guru Puthenveettil Sekhara Menon at the local Kaliyogam (Kathakali school) run by the Kavalappara palace. He had been an instructor with leading performing arts institutes like Kerala Kalamandalam, PSV Natyasangham in Kottakkal and Kadathanattu Kaliyogam.

Kalamandalam Ramankutty Nair was a flag-bearing disciple of Kavalappara, having worked on his guru's portrayal of Hanuman roles. His other prominent disciples include Kalamandalam Krishnan Nair, Guru Gopinath, Kottakkal Krishnankutty Nair, Ananda Sivaram and Kelu Nair. Kudamaloor Karunakaran Nair too had his northern-style classes under Naraynan Nair.

== See also ==
- Kathakali
- Guru Gopinath
- Mani Madhava Chakyar
- Kavalappara Nair
