= Thankamani Gopinath =

Indian Mohiniyattam dancer (1918–1990)

- Born: Mangat Mulaykkal Thankamani; 27 March 1918; Thrissur (in present Kerala)
- Died: 28 December 1990 (aged 72)
- Occupations: Mohiniyattam dancer, keral Natanam dance teacher
- Known for: Kerala Natanam
- Spouse: Guru Gopinath

Mangat Mulaykkal Thankamani, known by her married name Thankamani Gopinath (27 March 1918 – 28 December 1990) was a prominent Indian Mohiniyattam dancer and dance teacher from Kerala. The wife and co-dancer of Guru Gopinath, she was the first student of Mohiniyattam from Kalamandalam. Thankamani is considered as one of the important icons in the history of women's progress in Kerala, who learned Mohiniyattam at a time when learning and performing dance was considered unethical for girls in Kerala. She has also starred and sang a song in the 1941 Malayalam movie Prahlada.

== Biography ==
Thankamani was born on 27 March 1918 at Kunnamkulam in present-day Thrissur district. Here parents were Panthalat Govindan Nair and Mangat Mulakkal Kunjikavamma. When Vallathol started Kalamandalam, she was the first Mohiniyattam student to enroll there.

She married Guru Gopinath in September 1936. Thangamani became one of the earliest actresses in Malayalam after she played the role of Kayathu in Prahlada (1941), the third Malayalam sound film alongside her husband Guru Gopinath. Along with being the female lead, she also sang in the film. After the marriage Thangamani gradually stopped dancing Mohiniyattam. Together, they developed and popularized an innovative dance style called Kerala Natanam (originally named Kathakali Natanam). Thankamani's Pantadi dance and Udyana Varnana together with the dances of Radhakrishna, Sivaparvati, Lakshmi Narayana and Sita of Ashokavana she performed with Guru Gopinath were once popular in South India.

Thangamani taught dance at Sree Chitrodaya Dance College, which was the first dance school in Travancore. She was the teacher of most of the early students who learned Kerala Natanam like Lalitha, Padmini, Ragini, Bhavani Chellappan, Mangala and Lakshmi.

Guru Gopinath-Thangamani Gopinath was one of the most popular dance pairs in India during the 1940s and 1950s. Thangamani, who left the dance stage in the late 1960s became a member of the Vishwa Kala Kendram Bharana Samiti in Vattiyoorkavu, Thiruvananthapuram. She died on 28 December 1990, three years after the death of Guru Gopinath.
