= Atom Bomb (film) =

1964 film

- Directed by: P. Subramaniam
- Written by: N. P. Chellappan Nair
- Based on: Atom Bomb by N. P. Chellappan Nair
- Produced by: P. Subramaniam
- Starring: K. Balaji; Kaviyoor Ponnamma; Adoor Bhasi; Thikkurissy Sukumaran Nair
- Cinematography: M. Kannappan
- Edited by: N. Gopalakrishnan
- Music by: Br Lakshmanan
- Production company: Neela Productions
- Release date: 18 April 1964
- Country: India
- Language: Malayalam

Atom Bomb is a 1964 Indian Malayalam-language satirical film, directed and produced by P. Subramaniam, and written by N. P. Chellappan Nair. The film stars K. Balaji, Kaviyoor Ponnamma, Adoor Bhasi and Thikkurissy Sukumaran Nair. Based on Chellappan Nair's play of the same name, it was released on 18 April 1964.

== Cast ==
- Prem Nawas as Sudhakaran
- Ragini as Sushama
- K. V. Shanthi as Kamala
- K. Balaji as Kochu Ragavan
- Kaviyoor Ponnamma
- Adoor Bhasi as Butlar
- Thikkurissy Sukumaran Nair as Kurungodan
- Adoor Pankajam as Kalyani Kutty
- Aranmula Ponnamma as Janaki Amma
- N. P. Chellappan Nair
- Paravoor Bharathan
- S. P. Pillai
- Vanakkutty Raman Pillai

== Soundtrack ==
The music was composed by Br Lakshmanan, with lyrics by Thirunayinaarkurichi Madhavan Nair.

Song	Singers
"Azhakil Mikachathethu"	S. Janaki, P. B. Sreenivas
"Daivame" (Manassinte Maniyarayil)	P. Susheela
"Ennumuthal Ennumuthal"	P. Leela
"Love Venamo"	S. Janaki
"Naanikkunnille"	P. Leela, A. P. Komala
"Njaanoru Kaadenkil"	Thirunayinaarkurichi Madhavan Nair
"Oh My Darling"	S. Janaki, Kamukara
"Pande Paranju Njan Ponne" (Kudumbasuthranam)	K. J. Yesudas, L. R. Eeswari
"Romeo Romeo"	P. Leela, P. B. Sreenivas
