= Champakulam =

- Village
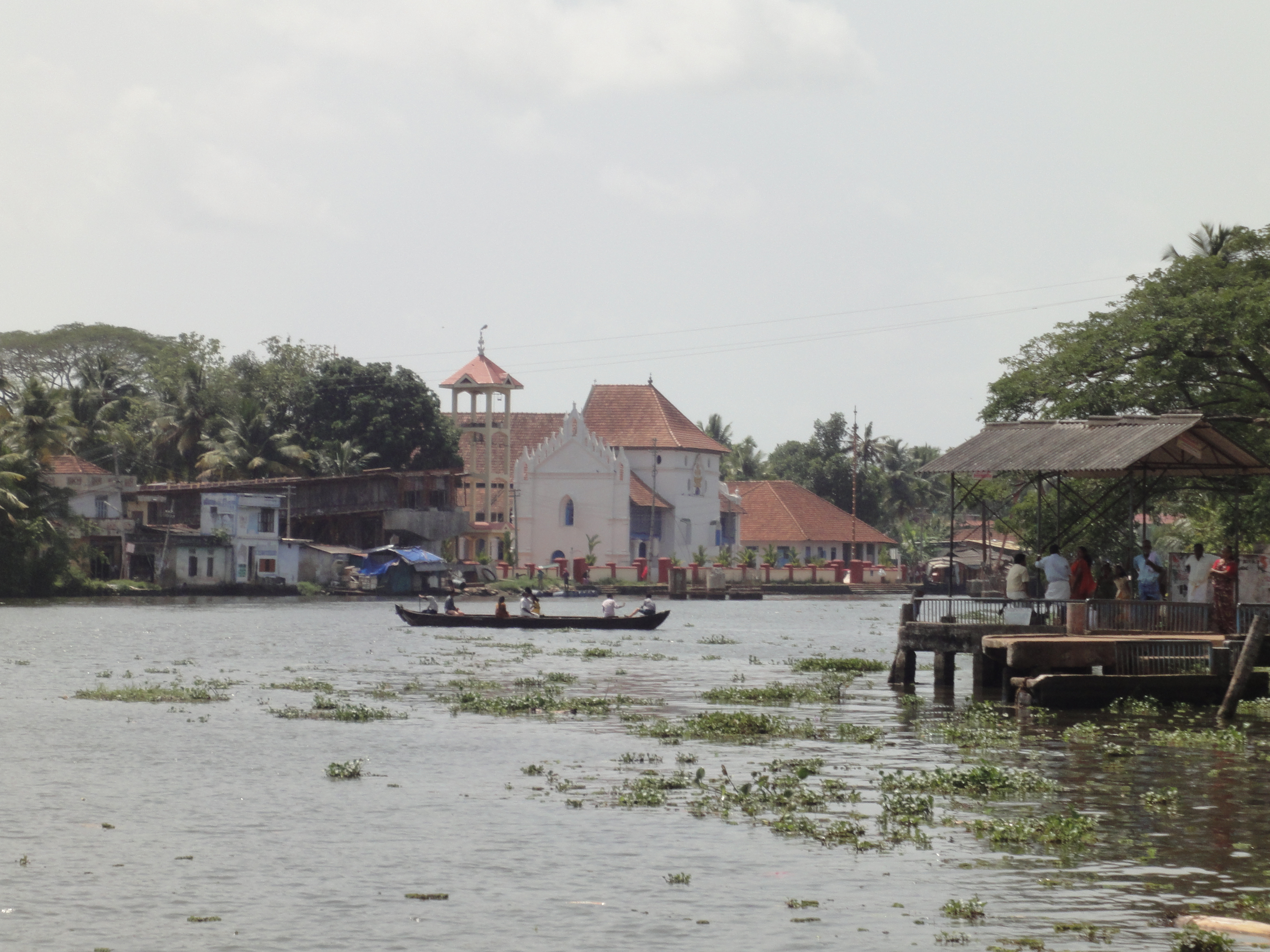
- The new bridge being constructed to connect east and west Champakulam across Pampa River near to Champakulam Church
- Interactive map of Champakulam
- Coordinates: 9.411447°N 76.412723°E
- Country: India
- State: Kerala
- District: Alappuzha
- Talukas: Kuttanad
- Elevation: 1 m (3.3 ft)

Languages
  - Official: Malayalam, English
- Time zone: UTC+5:30 (IST)
- PIN: 688505
- Telephone code: (0477 27...)
- Vehicle registration: KL-66
- Climate: Tropical wet

Champakulam Moolam Boat Race

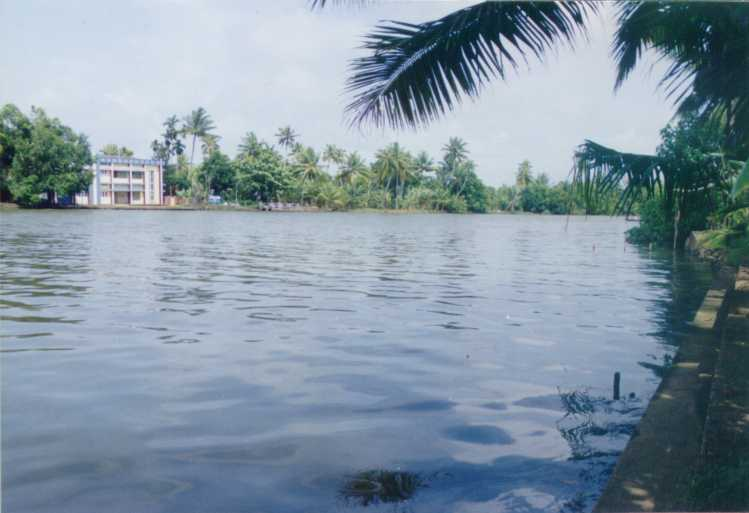
River Pampa passing through Champakulam

Champakulam is a village in Kerala, India. It is in Alappuzha district. Champakulam is part of Kuttanad, the rice bowl of Kerala, and is resplendent in green paddy fields, coconut groves and water fowl. Champakulam is an important tourist spot and is famous for the Champakulam Moolam Boat Race. The river Pampa flows through the village, splitting it into two. It is connected by road to Alappuzha, Changanassery and Edathua.

== Champakulam Kalloorkadu St. Mary's Forane Church (Valia Palli) ==
Champakulam Kalloorkadu St. Mary's Forane Church (also called Champakulam Valia Palli) is one of the oldest Christian churches in India and the mother church of almost all Catholic Syrian churches in Alleppey District. Believed to be established in AD 427. Rebuilt many times and the many rock inscriptions found around the church tell about the history of the church. The open air rock cross at Champakulam church is one of the most ancient with clear documentation of its antiquity up to AD 1151.

There are many archaeological artifacts found around the church about its history. Champakulam church was once under Niranam Church. Champakulam Church had very friendly relations with the Jacobite Syrian group and had a pivotal role in many ecumenical efforts in the eighteenth century. Belongs to the Syro-Malabar Catholic Church of India.

The annual feast at this church is on the 3rd Sunday of October every year. The feast of St. Joseph is celebrated on March 19.

== Champakulam Moolam Boat Race ==
The Champakulam Moolam Boat Race is the oldest and one of the most popular vallam kali (snake boat race) in Kerala state of south India. The race is held on Pamba River on the Moolam day (according to the Malayalam Era M.E) of the Malayalam month Midhunam, the day of the installation of the deity at the Ambalappuzha Sree Krishna Swamy Temple.

=== Champakulam Chundan ===
Chundans (snake boats) are supposed to be Navy boats of Chempakasserry rulers. Now they are only using for the races. Traditionally each boat belongs to a village, and the villagers worship that boat like a deity. Only men are allowed to touch the boat, and to show respect they should be barefooted. To make the boat slippery while in the water, it is oiled with a mixture of fish oil, coconut shell carbon and eggs. Repair work is done annually by the village carpenter. Constructed according to specifications taken from the Sthapathya Veda, an ancient treatise for the building of wooden boats, Champakulam Chundan has 130 ft length and breadth of 69 inches It has a depth of 22 inches with the rear portion towering to a height of about 11 ft, and a long tapering front portion, it resembles a snake with its hood raised. Its hull is built of planks precisely 83 feet in length and six inches wide. It can accommodate 105 oarsmen. This chundan can cover a distance of 1.4 km in about 5 minutes.

In the centre of the chundan vallom, which was earlier the place of the canon, stand two people who beat the odithatta (fire platforms) with poles and sing the vanchippattu (songs of the boatmen) to maintain the rowing rhythm. While the strongest oarsmen sit at the front to set the pace, the back is managed by six hefty amarackars (helmsmen) who stand and help steer the boat. The person at the highest point of the boat is the chief oarsman. Champakulam Chundan is the winner of several boat races including hatric winner of the Nehru Trophy Boat Race during 1989, 1990, and 1991.

Later the boat was procured by UST Global, a California-based IT services company. It was handed over to UST Global by the owners Champakulam Boat Club at a gala ceremony conducted at Alappuzha on 21 December 2013. The UST Global Trivandrum Campus will be the new home for Champakulam Chundan.

New Champakulam Chundan sculptured by Uma Maheswaran, in around 180 days with an approximate cost of ₹56 Lakhs. It can accommodate 104 oarsmen. It is the winner of 2014 Nehru Trophy Boat Race.

== Educational Institutions ==
St. Mary's Higher Secondary School
St. Thomas UP School
Bishop Kurialacherry Public School
Porukara Memorial School

== Notable personalities from Champakulam ==
- Shyama
- Guru Gopinath
- Bishop Kurialassery
- Champakulam Pachupilla
- Saji Thomas International Sportsman, Arjuna Awardee

== Tourism ==
Champakulam is an important tourist spot. There are hundreds of houseboats moving along the Pampa River every day. Champakulam church (Valia Palli) and Champakulam snake boat (and some other snake boats too) are some of the tourist attractions. There are a number of resorts where people can stay and enjoy the beauty of nature. Champakulam angadi has some art-emporiums where tourists might find items of interest.

== Art emporium ==
St. Thomas Art emporium has high quality statues - mostly on wood are produced here. A lot of these are exported to other countries too.

== Places in and around Champakulam ==
Though Champakulam is a village itself, there are many other small places in and around Champakulam. Some of them are part of Champakulam.

- Amichakari
- Champakulam
- Kandankary
- Kondakkal
- Manapra
- Mankombu
- Nedumudi
- Padaharam
- Pulincunnu
- Pullangadi
- Thekkekkara
- Vaisyambhagom
- Nadubhagam

== Champakulam Bridge ==
The two banks (East and West) of Pampa River in Champakulam were only connected by ferries previously. Construction of a new bridge is completed recently and it is open to public now. This bridge connects the east and west banks of Champakulam. This also connects the 2 bus stations on either side of the river.

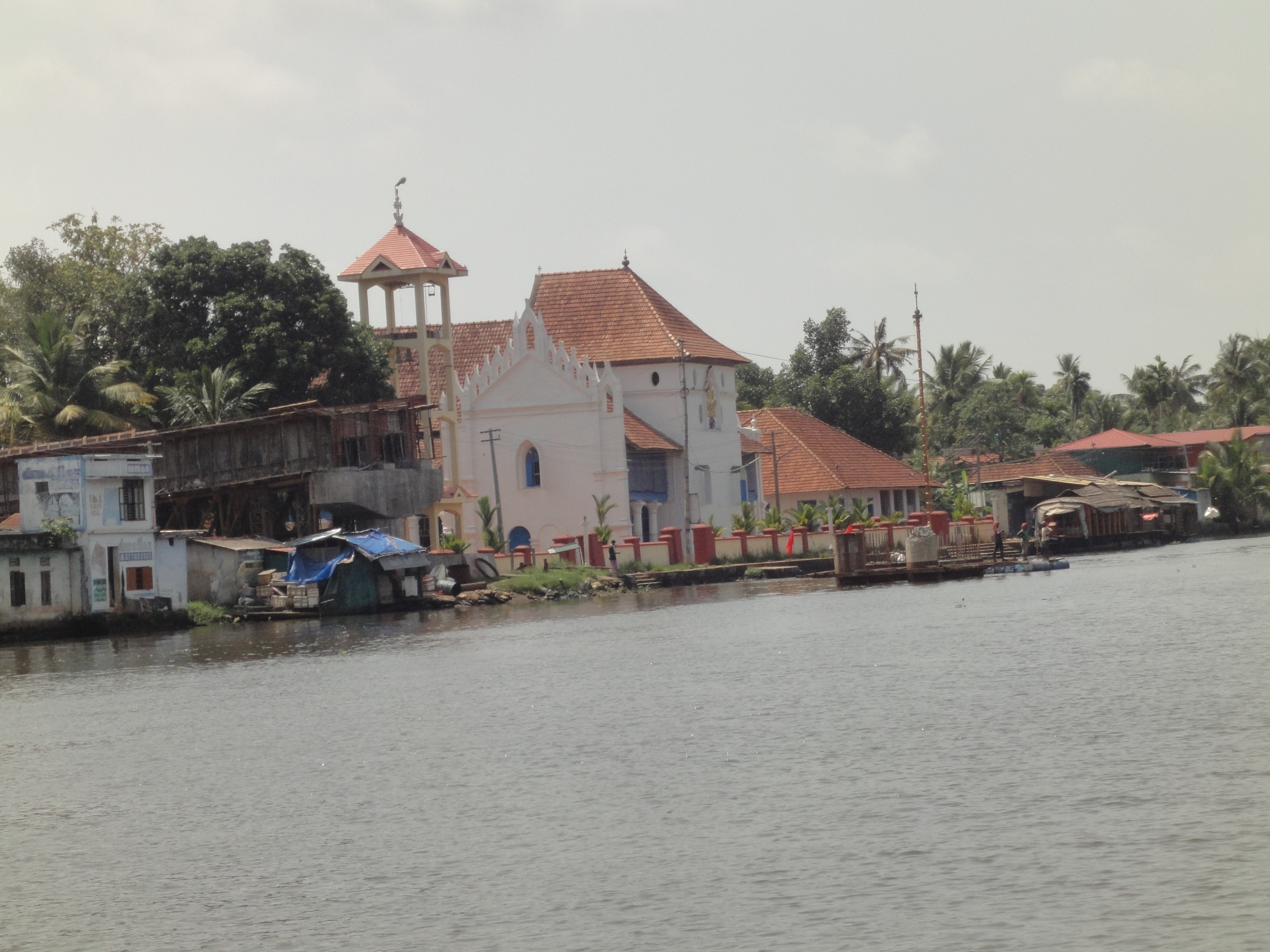
The new bridge connecting east and west Champakulam during construction Pampa River near to Champakulam Church
