= Kerala Natanam =

Classical dance of India

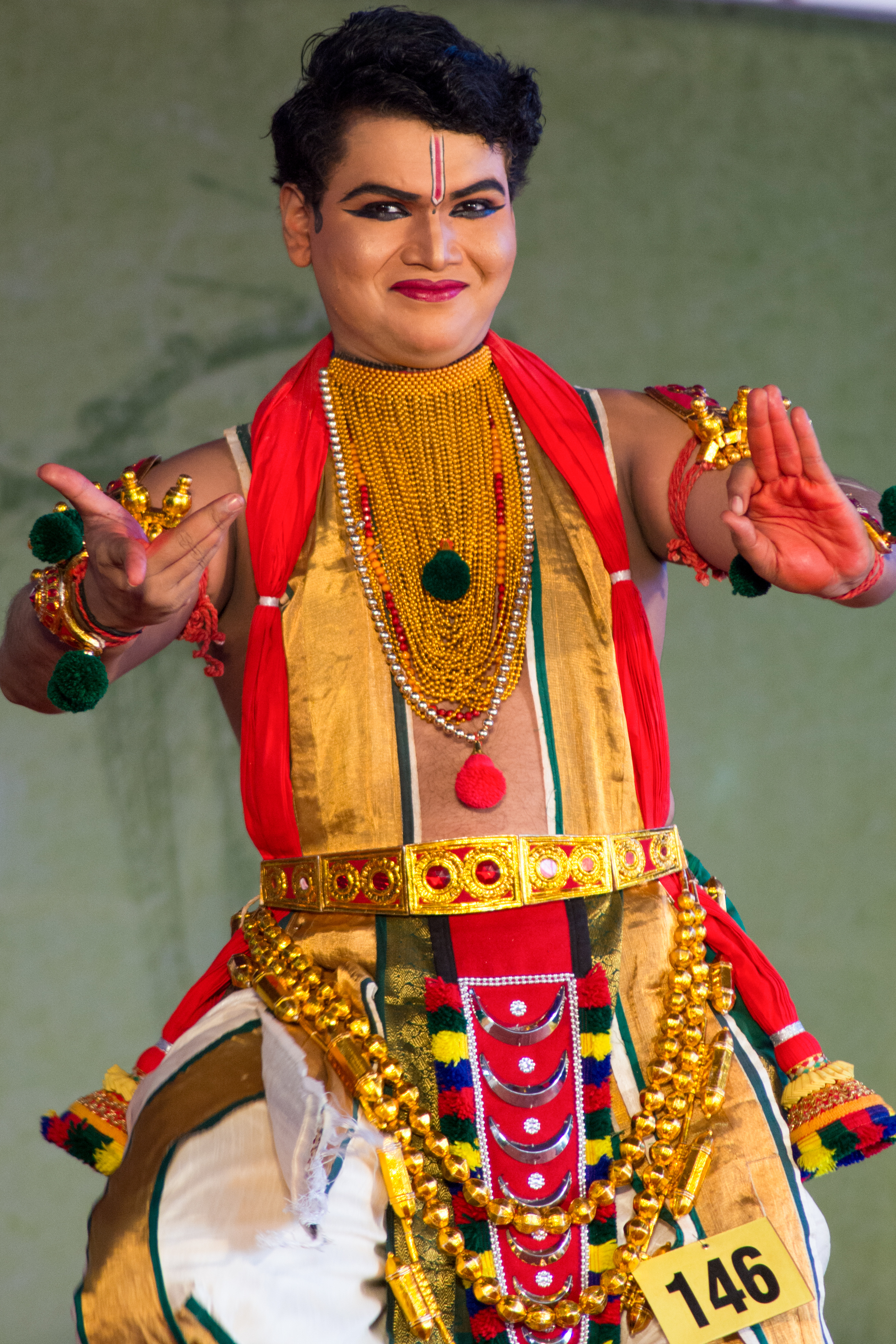
- Keralanadanam
- Genre: Indian classical dance
- Origin: Kerala

Kerala Natanam (Kerala Dance) is a new style of dance that is now recognised as a distinct art form evolved from Kathakali, a form of Indian dance-drama. The Indian dancer Guru Gopinath, a well-trained Kathakali artist, and his wife Thankamani Gopinath who was the first student of Mohiniyattam in Kerala Kalamandalam, developed a unique structure for teaching and performing classical dance forms of India whose origins are from Kathakali. Solo, duets, dance dramas and traditional folk dances were the material they chose.

== Style ==
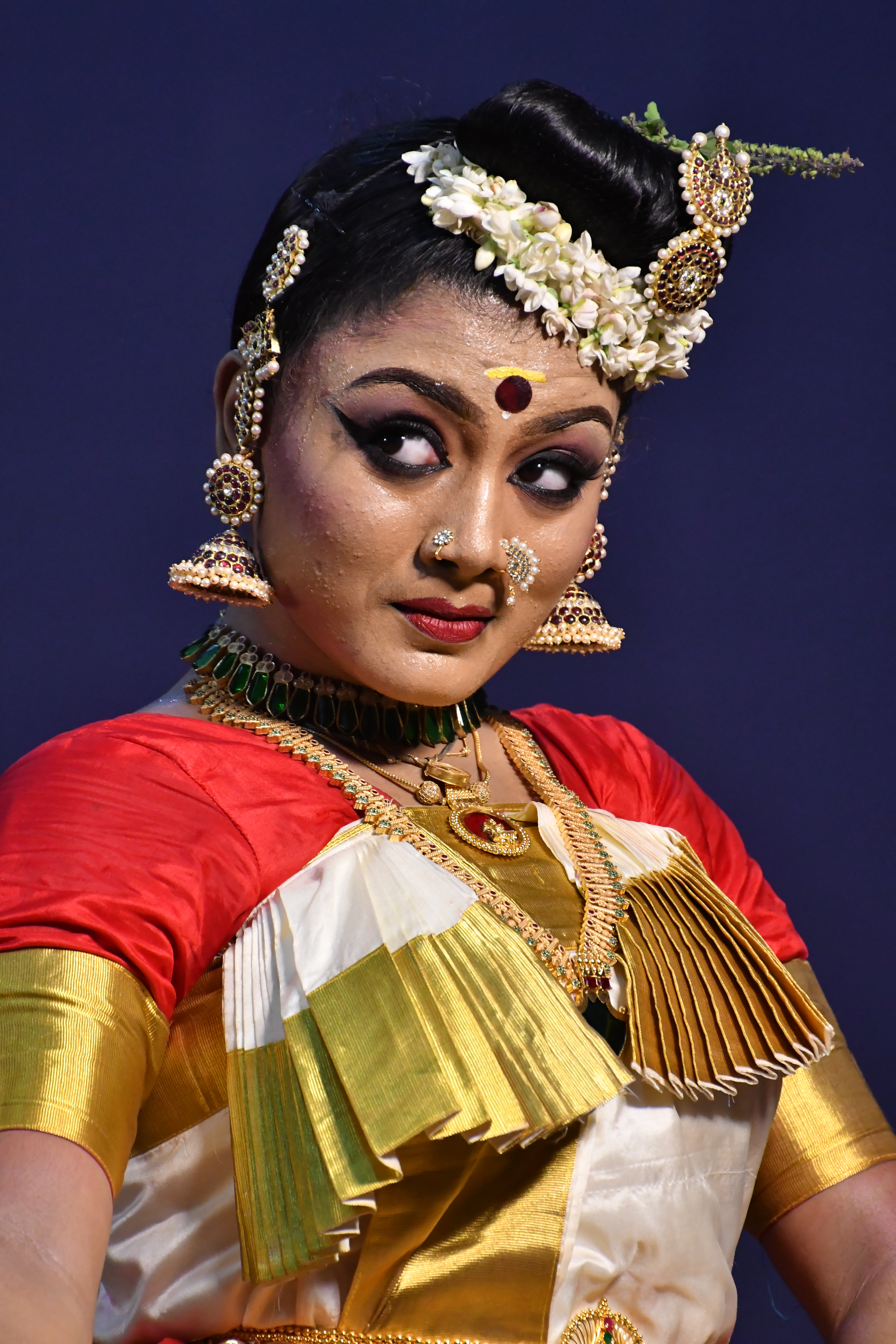
Kerala Natanam

Guru Gopinath and Thankamani's dance programs found traditional pieces existing side by side with those modified to present a variety of themes. Their style relied heavily on the angika abhinaya (body movements and gestures) and satvika abhinaya (facial expressions) from Kathakali. The major stance of Kathakali was changed by Gopinath to a more convenient pose that could rest well with the tribhanga concept.

Another significant deviation was in aharya abhinaya (costume mode), where they adopted costumes and facial makeup to suit the role. Thus, in a dance on Jesus Christ, the dancer dressed like Christ. In social dances the artists wore the dress of labourers, peasants, folk, etc. Likewise roles of Srikrishna, king, snake charmer, hunter had the appropriate attire. For the first time Carnatic music compositions used for concerts were rendered into dance forms by Gopinath. Unlike traditional Kathakali and Mohini attam, a variety of musical instruments were added to his presentations.

Even though during his lifetime Guru Gopinath did not give a name to his style, after his death the movement to give his style a name gained momentum. In 1993, during the Global Conference on Guru Gopinath and Kerala Nadanam held in Trivandrum, a Sanskrit definition was given to this style by his students: Keraleeya Shaastriya Sargaathmaka Nrittham — "A traditional creative dance style originating from Kerala."

Kerala Nadanam can be performed in three ways: Ekamga Nadanam (solo), Samgha Nadanam (group), Nataka Nadanam (dance drama enacting a story). Male–female pair dancing is a distinct style in Kerala Nadanam. So also he has extended the dance drama to five or six hours long performance called Indian ballets.

== See also ==
- Guru Chandrasekharan (1916–1998), classical dancer who performed Kerala Natanam
