= Kudamaloor Karunakaran Nair =

India artist

Kudamaloor Karunakaran Nair (1916-2000) was a pioneering Kathakali artiste who brought to prominence female characters in the classical dance-drama from Kerala in south India.

Kathakali gained a lot through Karunakaran Nair's artistic contributions as his professional career coincided with that of the legendary Kalamandalam Krishnan Nair. With his charming face and graceful feminine movements on the stage, Kudamaloor, as he was simply known (by his place of birth), gained name as the ideal heroine opposite Krishnan Nair's protagonists. Kudamaloor's prominent roles like Damayanti, Lalita, Kunti, Mohini, Rukmini, Devayani, Sairandhri and Draupadi complemented Krishnan Nair's lead roles like Nalan, Karnan, Rugmangadan and Keechakan.

Born in Kudamaloor village of Kottayam district, Karunakaran Nair was initiated to Kathakali by guru Kurichi Rama Panikkar. Later, he had his higher studies from Kurichi Kunhan Panikkar, Thottam Sankaran Namboodiri and Kochappi-Raman brothers. He later gained eminence in the northern school of Kathakali from the late Kavalappara Narayanan Nair. Kudamaloor also donned male roles like Kuchelan (Sudama) in the storyplay Kuchelavrittam and Naradan in Balivijayam.

Kudamaloor had worked as a tutor at the FACT Kathakali School off Kochi, and later at the Kudamaloor Kala Kendram in his native place. Karunakaran Nair was a forerunner of Kottakkal Sivaraman, who further made female roles an important slot in Kathakali.

A winner of the awards by the Central Sangeet Natak Akademi and that of the Kerala Sangeetha Nataka Akademi, Kudamaloor died on October 17, 2000.

Kudamaloor Karunakaran Nair's legacy is continued by his disciple Maryse Noiseux, his son-in-law Mathoor Govindan Kutty and grandson Kudamaloor Muralikrishnan.
