= Kurumbalakotta =

Monolith hillock in Kerala

Coordinates: 11.696146°N 76.033550°E

Kurumbalakotta (Malayalam: കുറുമ്പാലക്കോട്ട) is a hill in Kottathara of Wayanad district, Kerala. It is 20 km from Kalpetta. It is a monolith hillock in Kerala.

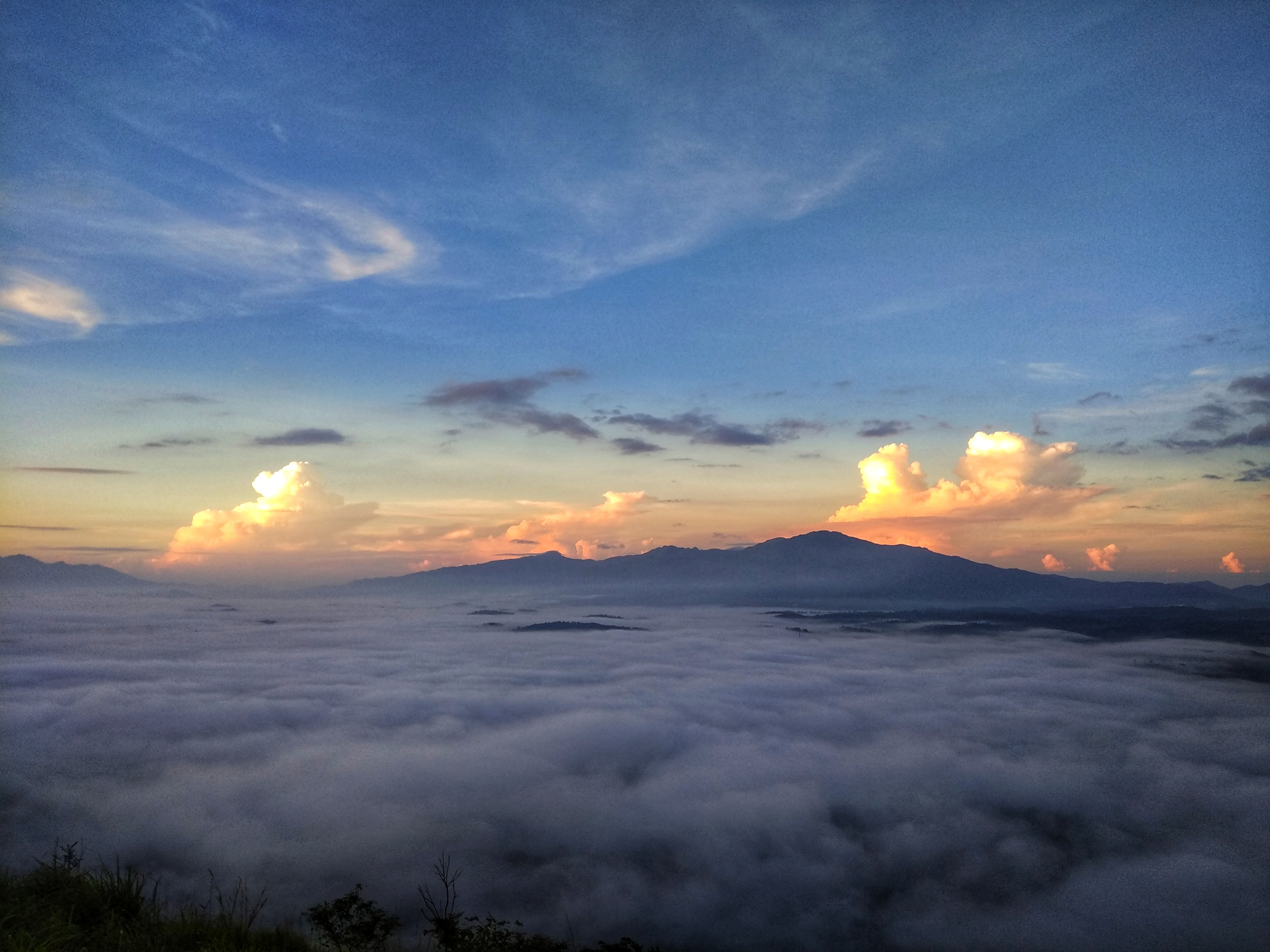
View from Kurumbalakotta

It rises to 991 m (3251.31234 feet) above sea level. It is situated in the centre of Wayanad and also a part of Deccan Plateau and the confluence of Western Ghats and Eastern Ghats. From the hill top, one can see the full scenery of Wayanad plateau. Misty mountains and valleys around the hill gives a pleasant atmosphere for trekkers.

The hill is located in Kottathara panchayat of Vythiri taluk, Wayanad district. Venniyode is the nearby small town. Tourists may reach by road from Kalpetta through Kambalakkad junction.

In July 2024, it was affected by a huge landslide.
