= Koothali =

- Town
- Location in Kerala, India Koothali (India)
- Coordinates: 11°35′0″N 75°46′0″E
- Country: India
- State: Kerala
- District: Kozhikode

Area
  - Total: 14.13 km^{2} (5.46 sq mi)

Population (2011)
  - Total: 11,389
  - Density: 806.0/km^{2} (2,088/sq mi)

Languages
  - Official: Malayalam, English
- Time zone: UTC+5:30 (IST)
- PIN: 673532
- Vehicle registration: KL-77
- Nearest city: Kozhikode
- Lok Sabha constituency: Vatakara
- Vidhan Sabha constituency: Perambra

Koothali is a village near Perambra in Kozhikode district in the state of Kerala, India, and the traditional seat of the Koothali Nair.

The name Koothali has evolved from two terms: Kooth + Ali, in which "Kooth" means performing arts like "Kathakali", "Koodiyattam", etc., and "Ali" means the venue where such art forms are performed. In ancient times, Koothali was a place where this kind of performing arts was taught and practised by artists of "Koothali-Thambayi – the then ruler of Koothali. Koothali has around six hundred years of long history, and it goes back to the time of Tippu Sultan and beyond.

== Demographics ==
As of 2011 Census Koothali Village Had a Population of 11,389 of which 5,525 are males while 5,864 are female.

Religion in Koothali (2011)
Hinduism	77.3%
Islam	21.16%
Christianity	0%

== Transportation ==
Koothali village connects to other parts of India through Perambra town. The nearest airports are at Kannur and Kozhikode. The nearest railway station is at Koyiandy. The National Highway No.66 passes through Koyilandy and the northern stretch connects to Mangalore, Goa and Mumbai. The southern stretch connects to Cochin and Trivandrum. The State Highway No.54 going through Perambra, Koothali and Kuttiady connects to Kalpetta, and indirectly Mananthavady, Mysore and Bangalore.
