= Kettilamma =

Title

Kettilamma was the title held by the Nair consorts of the principal ruling Rajahs of Malabar (Northern Kerala) in pre-democratic feudal Kerala. Similarly, Nair consorts of the Maharajahs of southern Kingdoms of Kerala namely Cochin and of Travancore were known as Nethyar Amma and Panapillai Amma respectively. The form of marriage was referred to as Pattum Vala, after which she assumed the honorific title of Kettilamma.

== Notable people ==
- K. M. Kunhulakshmy Kettilamma (1877–1947) born in Kottayam, in Malabar, was a renowned scholar in Sanskrit and Malayalam. Her major work in Sanskrit was Prarthananjali. Among her Malayalam books were Savitrivrittam, Puranachandrika and Kausalyadevi. She edited the women's magazine Mahilaratnam.
- Avinjyat Kunjani Kettilamma was one of the two consorts of Kerala Varma Pazhassi Raja was famous for having faithfully accompanied the Raja even into forests during his guerilla war and was captured as a sick woman by British in 1805.
- Purameri Devaki Kettilamma was famous for her donations to the Satyagraha committee during Indian freedom struggle.

== See also ==
- North Malabar
