= Guru Chandrasekharan =

Indian classical dancer and choreographer

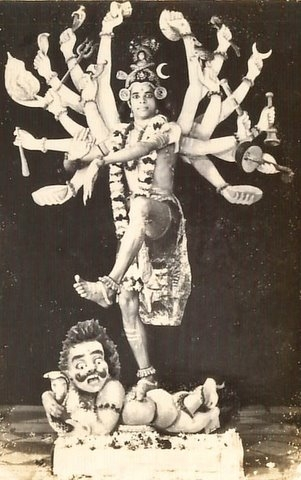
Guru Chandrasekharan as Shiva in the 1930s

Guru Chandrasekharan (1916–1998) was an Indian classical dancer, choreographer and instructor of Kathakali. He was born in Trivandrum, India in 1916. His father was N.K. Nair, an artist and notable oil painter. Guru Chandrasekharan held tenure at the Visva Bharati University (Santiniketan) from 1947 to 1950, where he was a Professor of Classical Dance, focusing on Kathakali.

== Early life and training ==
Guru Chandrashekharan was born on 1916 at Travancore (present-day Thiruvananthapuram district of Kerala). While studying at university, the young Chandrasekharan started practising dance without informing his parents and studied Kathakali Kerala Nadanam under the guidance of Guru Gopinath. During that period Guru Gopinath received Royal Patronage from the Palace of Travancore and a dance studio titled 'Sri. Chithrodaya Nirtha Kalalayam' was established by the Travancore Government in Poojappura in his honour. Chandrasekharan was a student of that school.

== Career ==
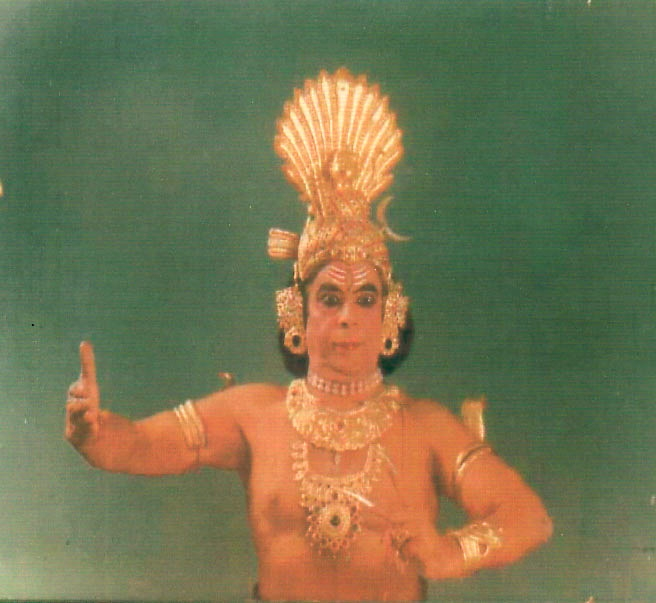
Guru Chandrasekharan as Nataraja in the 1980s

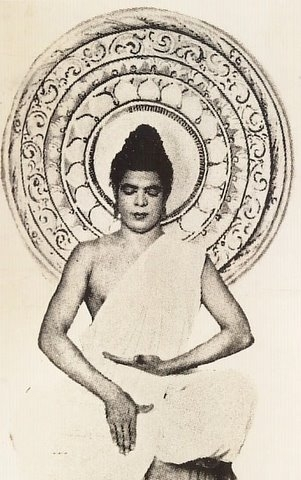
Guru Chandrasekharan as Buddha in the 1950s

Having left Guru Gopinath after some time, Chandrasekharan practised Kathakali under Nedumudi Narayana Kurup who was also an artist under the patronage of the Royal Palace of Travancore. Later he organized his own troupe and conducted performances in major cities in India.

Chandrasekharan was one of the pioneers of using current social themes in creating classical dance productions. He has directed and choreographed several social themes in dance form. In 1943, on an invitation from the British Government of India, he took his troupe to Alexandria in Egypt and parts of Italy to entertain soldiers of the British Indian Army who were engaged in military operations there as part of (World War II). At the close of the war in 1946 he was again invited to go on a tour of the Middle East, but that tour ended with only a preliminary performance in Jaffna, Ceylon.

Chandrasekharan served as a member of the Kerala University Senate, member of the board of directors of Kerala Kalamandalam, member of the Advisory Committee for the Malayalam Encyclopedia (Sarvavijnanakosam), director of Jawahar Bal Bhavan and as a visiting professor and chairman of the Board of Examination at the Swathi Thirunal College of Music.

In the late 1940s, he composed and played in the Voice of Travancore, a dance production with a political theme. It was a critique of the autocratic rule of the Dewan Sir. C.P. Ramaswamy Iyer and the people's movement of resistance thereon. However, C.P. became an admirer of Chandrasekharan's performances and arranged for annual performances at his official residence.

For "Voice of Travancore", Chandrasekhran's performance was praised in the report published by the All India Educational Conference held in Trivandrum in 1946. The review said: "The Nataraja Thandava was presented in a remarkable manner by Chandrasekharan. When he presented the Hunter Dance, his joy of being the monarch of all he surveyed in the forest was vividly perceivable. He aroused the tragic sentiments to a remarkable extent while he was experiencing suicidal agony as he was bitten by a snake. As he entered the 'Ardhanareeswara', here the body was responding to a double call of vigour and grace. It was perhaps more than what an Udayasankar could do". Another well-received composition by the Guru was "Polinja Deepam" (The Light That Died) depicting the sad end of Mahatma Gandhi, which he produced in 1948.

In 1949 he joined the Viswa-Bharati University (Santiniketan) as a professor of Kathakali Dance. During this period he choreographed and performed several of Rabindranath Tagore's famous dramatic dances such as Chithrangada, Chandalika, etc. in cities including New Delhi and Calcutta. At Viswa-Bharati, he had the opportunity to get acquainted with dance forms including those from Kandi, Bali and Burma. During his tenure he met and got well acquainted with the likes of Prof. Humayun Kabir, Zakir Husain (former President of India), etc.

Sri. S.K. George, a Gandhian and the former director of Dinabandhu Bhavan, Santiniketan once said about him:

"Sri Chandrasekharan was one of the best teachers of the Art that Santiniketan has had and did much to rouse interest in its study among students from various parts of the country. He delighted visitors to Santiniketan from all parts of the world during his stay there by the finished technique of his art and has received glowing testimonials from many of them, including delegates to the World Pacifist meeting. In Gurudev's dance-dramas like 'Chandalika', 'Chitrangata' and 'Syama' presented in Santiniketan and outside, he took the leading parts".

Having been at Viswa-Bharati for several years he left Santiniketan and started his own school in Trivandrum under the name of Prathabha Nrithakala Kendram and trained several disciples. In 1954, he performed Thilakkunna Mannu (Simmering Sand) which supported and advocated agrarian revolution. It received wide acclaim and was praised by the then President Rajendra Prasad and Vice-President Dr. Radhakrishnan.

Chandrasekharan's creative contribution includes such compositions as Voice of Travancore, Manishada, Shiva Thandavam, Ganesha Nritham, Ardhanareeswaram, Surya Nritham, Geethopadesam, Kalidasa's Kumara Sambhavam, Sakunthalam, Kumaran Asan's Chandala Bhikshuki, Vallathol's Magdalena Mariyam, Guruvum Sishyanum, Vayalar's Ayisha, Changampuzha's Ramanan, Markandeyan, Mohini, Rugmangada, Savithri, Dakshayagom, Ekalavyan, Chilappadikaram, Pigmalin (adaptation of a Greek original), Fisherman's Revenge (adaptation of a Chinese original), Prapidiyan Pathalathil (adaptation of the Japanese Esashiyuvo), Salome (based on the Biblical character of the same name) and many more. He composed and performed several ballets such as Sri Guruvayurappan, Kumara Sambhavam, Sri Ayyappan, Hrishya Sringan, and Sri Hanuman.

A production of particular note by the late guru is Himavante Makkal (Children of the Himalayas) which was created in 1964 as a response to the Indo-Chinese border conflict of the same year. Having seen it, V.V. Giri, the governor of Kerala at the time was so impressed that he invited Chandrasekharan to the Raj Bhavan of Kerala as an honoured guest. The following is an excerpt from his official praise for the play:

"I am delighted to witness a performance a dance drama based on National Integration presented by Pratibha Nrithakala Kendra, Trivandrum, and directed by the famous and distinguished dancer Chandrasekharan. This play describes the various periods through which we have passed from Vedic period up to the present day. It is a most thought-provoking play and one who attends this function will feel enthused and inspired and would strengthen his spirit of patriotism and love of sacrifice for his country."

In 1965 Guru Chandrasekharan composed a play which was the first of its kind (in any of the official languages) based on the Mahabharatha character Karna. Chandrasekharan played the role of Karna with a cast of over 100 others. It was presented in Trivandrum and ran for a considerable amount of time. It was produced by Kala Nilayam Theatres. He further produced another opera, Bhishmar, which was also based on a Mahabharata character of the same name. This production was undertaken entirely by his own production company and, while it was a critical success, failed financially, forcing him to withdraw from the scene. He did, however, undertake other artistic pursuits well into the 1980s.

He was honoured by his peers in 1976 with an award from the Kerala Sangeetha Nataka Academy. At a public function to celebrate his Shashthipurthi (60th birthday) at Hassan Marrikar Hall, Trivandrum (with Prof. Ayappa Panicker acting as the master of ceremonies), he was conferred the title of "Guru" by the city of Trivandrum. Chandrasekharan has written several articles and periodicals about the dance forms of India. His book on Bharathanatyam Natiya Nirishanam is one of the defining works on the subject and was the culmination of research conducted under the Fellowship Award from the government of India. He was also a prolific oil painter and received an award from the government of Kerala for his art work in 1973.

== Personal life ==
Chandrasekharan married Mohanavalli Amma who belonged to the Kalappurakkal House, Karumaloor, North Paravur, Kerala, India. She was the daughter of V.K Gopala Panicker, Asst|Superintendent of Police in the former Travancore State. Because of the hardships he endured during his artistic career, he did not encourage his children to follow him into the field. His eldest son, Santhikumar, is a food technologist settled in Canada, and his younger son, Krishnakumar, is a Dy director in the (Sports Authority of India). One of his daughters, Ragini died in the late 2000s and his youngest child Renuka is a former actress and a classical dancer.

Chandrasekharan died in Trivandrum of cardiac arrest at the age of 82 on 5 August 1998.

The poet Harindranth Chatopadhyaya wrote this to him on 21 February 1952.

"Courage is this that single willed unaided lone you build and build which shows you have the spirits pluck so from the heart, I wish you luck."

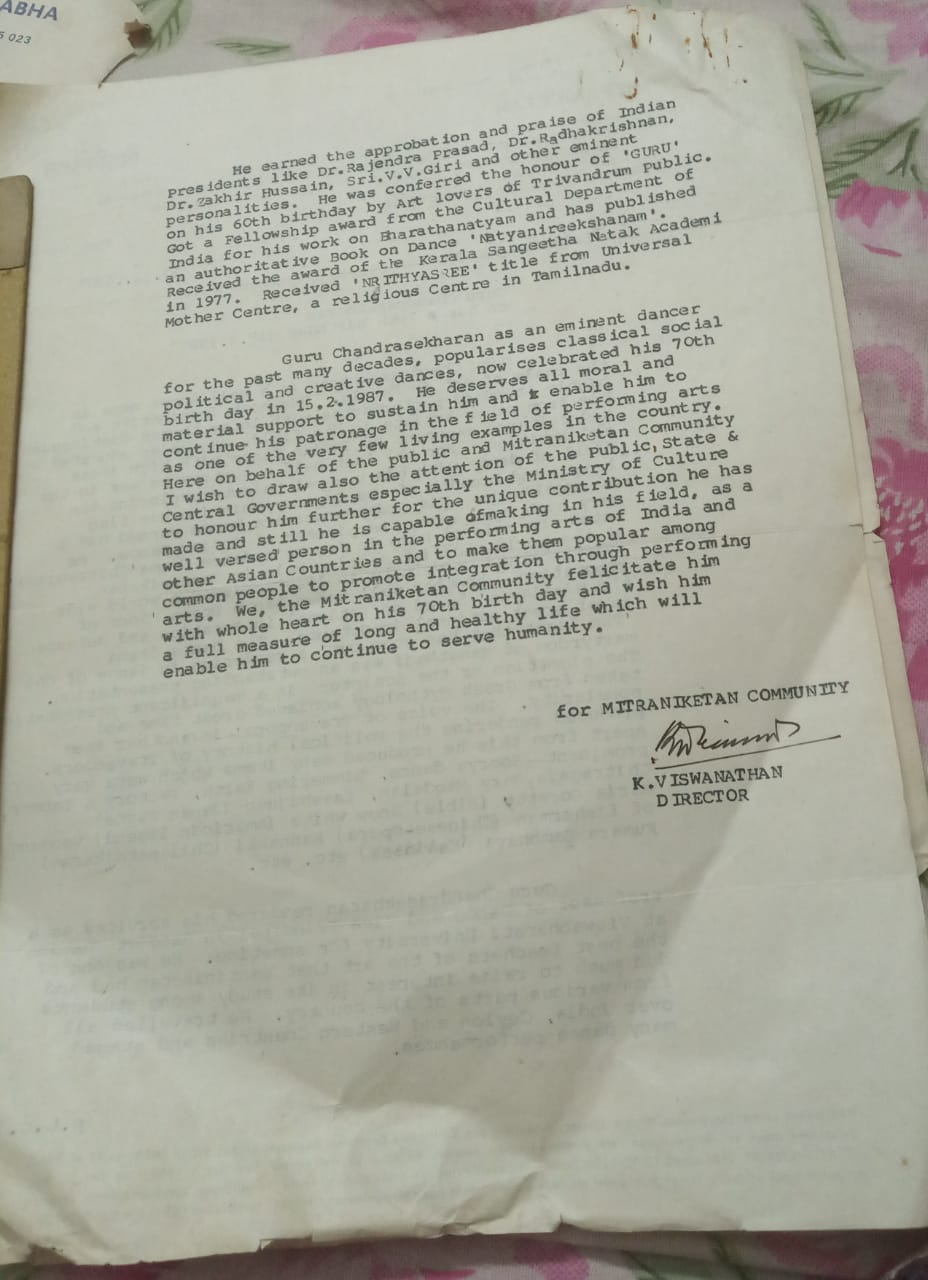
