= Kandankary =

- Village
- Location in Kerala, India
- Coordinates: 9°23′38″N 76°26′14″E
- Country: India
- State: Kerala
- District: Alappuzha
- Taluk: Kuttanad

Government
  - Body: Panchayath

Languages
  - Official: Malayalam, English
- Time zone: UTC+5:30 (IST)
- PIN: 689573
- Telephone code: 0477
- Vehicle registration: KL-66, KL-04
- Nearest city: Alappuzha/Aleppey, Changanassery, Thiruvalla
- Literacy: 97.64%.

Kandankary is a small village in Kerala, India. It is located in Champakulam Panchayat in Kuttanad Taluk.

== Geography ==
It is presumed that this region (most part of Kuttanad) was a very big forest in ancient years, but later destroyed by a forest fire. It is still possible to see "kari" (coal) if we dig deep into the soil. So this place name end-up with Kari. The main source of income is agriculture. The rice fields are a key feature of the place. The village is located on the banks of the Pamba River. This village is known for its ancient temple Kandakarykkavu Devi Temple and St. Joseph's Church and DVHSS Kandankary.

Kandankary is located 18 km from Changanacherry,19 km from Alappuzha & 44 km from Kottayam.

== Economy ==
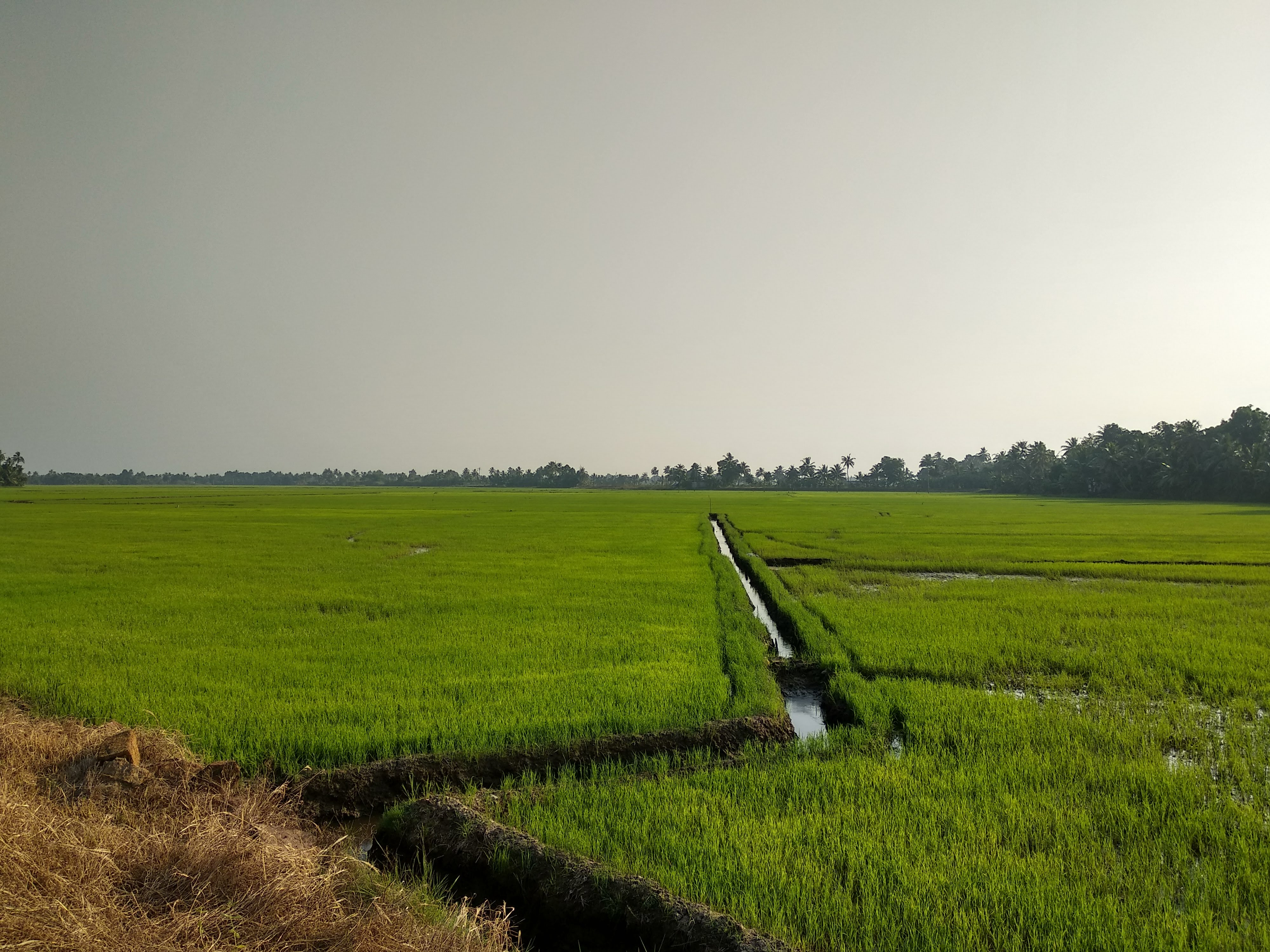
Kandankary paddy cultivation

Due to the good soil and availability of water, paddy cultivation is traditionally practiced by most people here. After harvest, the fields are irrigated and fish farming is started. This is another source of income for the farmers here.

== Shrines ==
- Kandankary Kavu Devi Temple
- St. Joseph's Church Kandankary

== School ==
- D V Higher Secondary School

== Transportation ==
- (K.S.R.TC) Kerala State Road Transport Corporation
- (S.W.T.D) State Water Transport Department

== Gallery ==
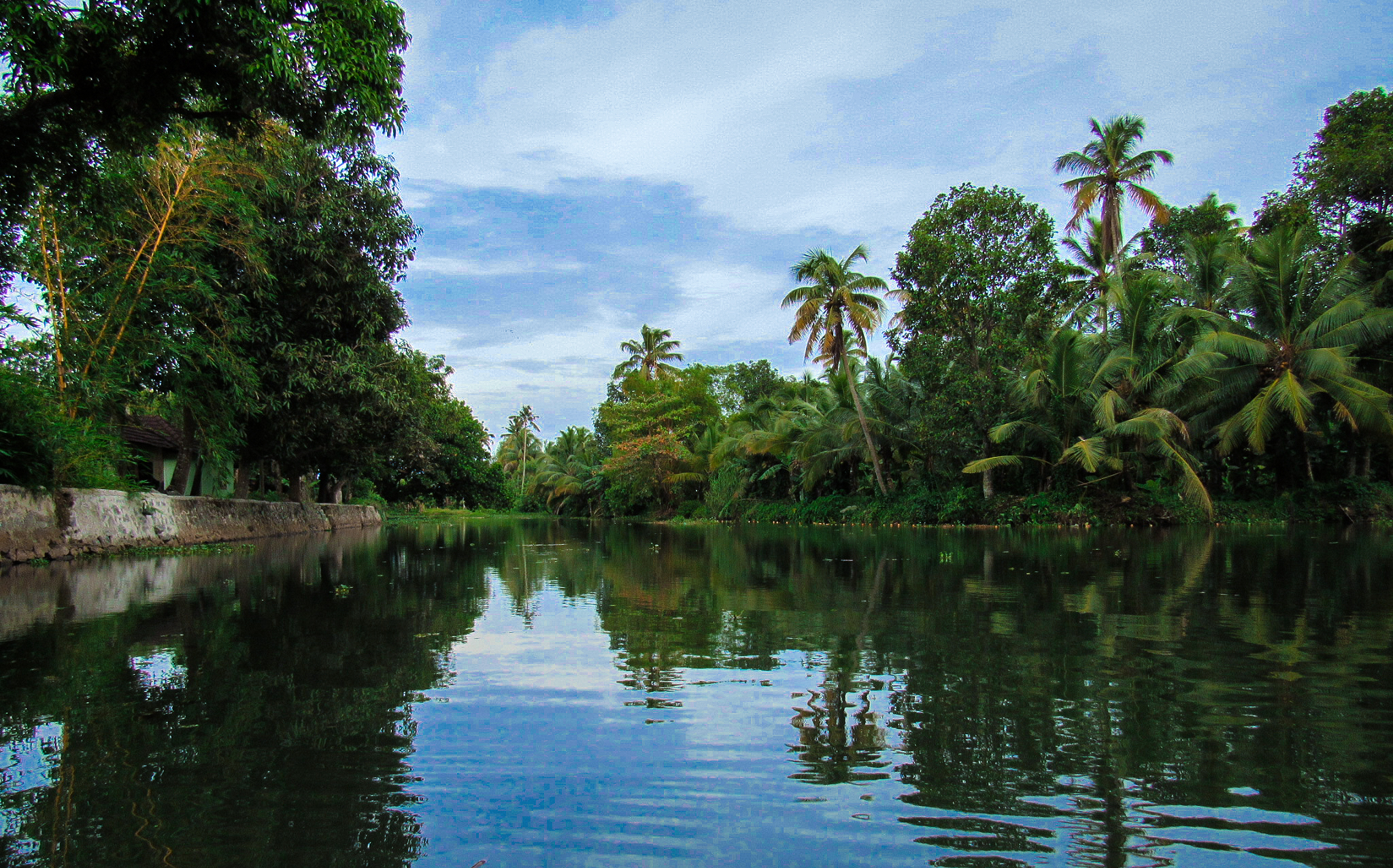
Kandankary backwater view

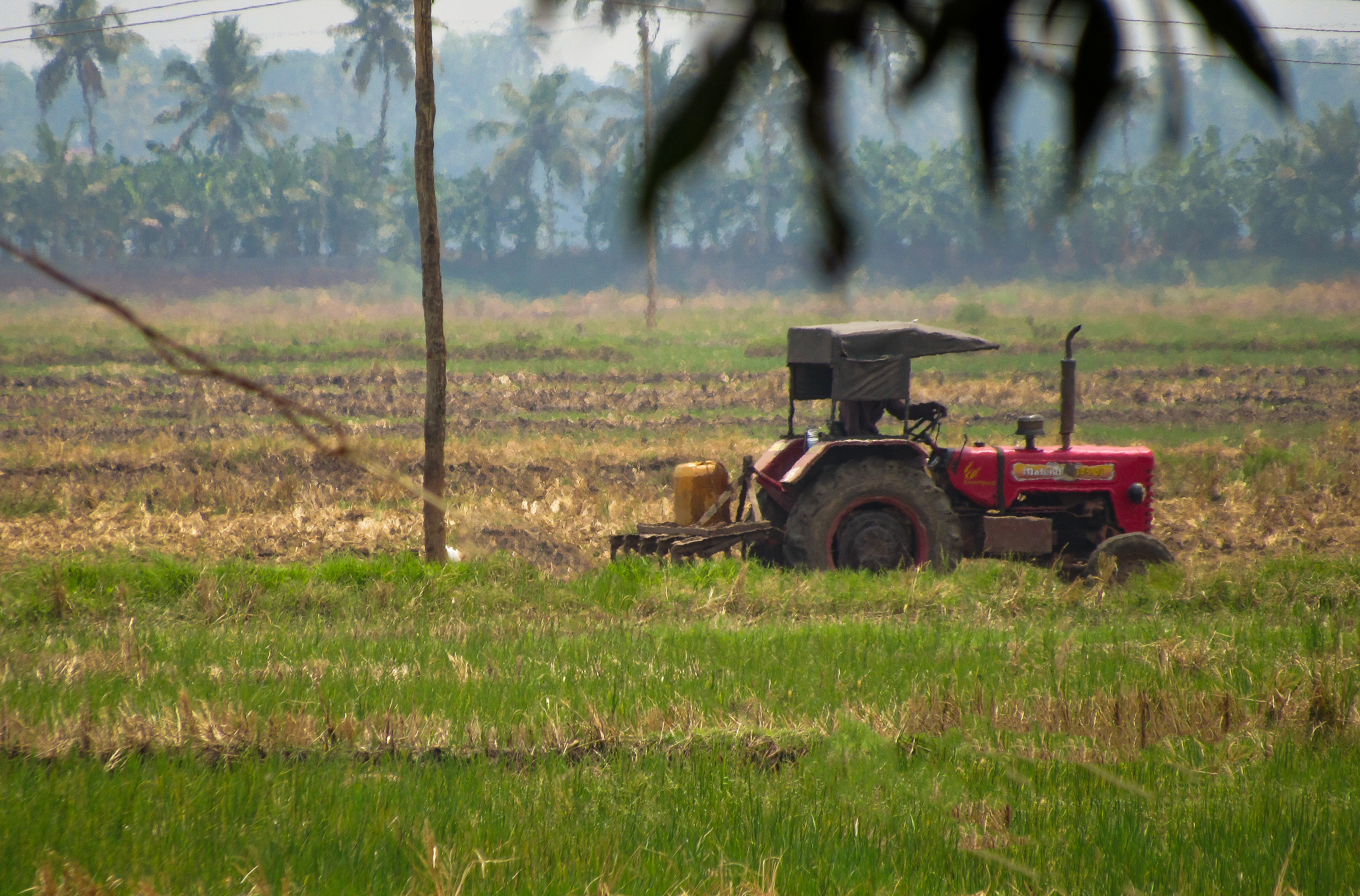
Local paddy field

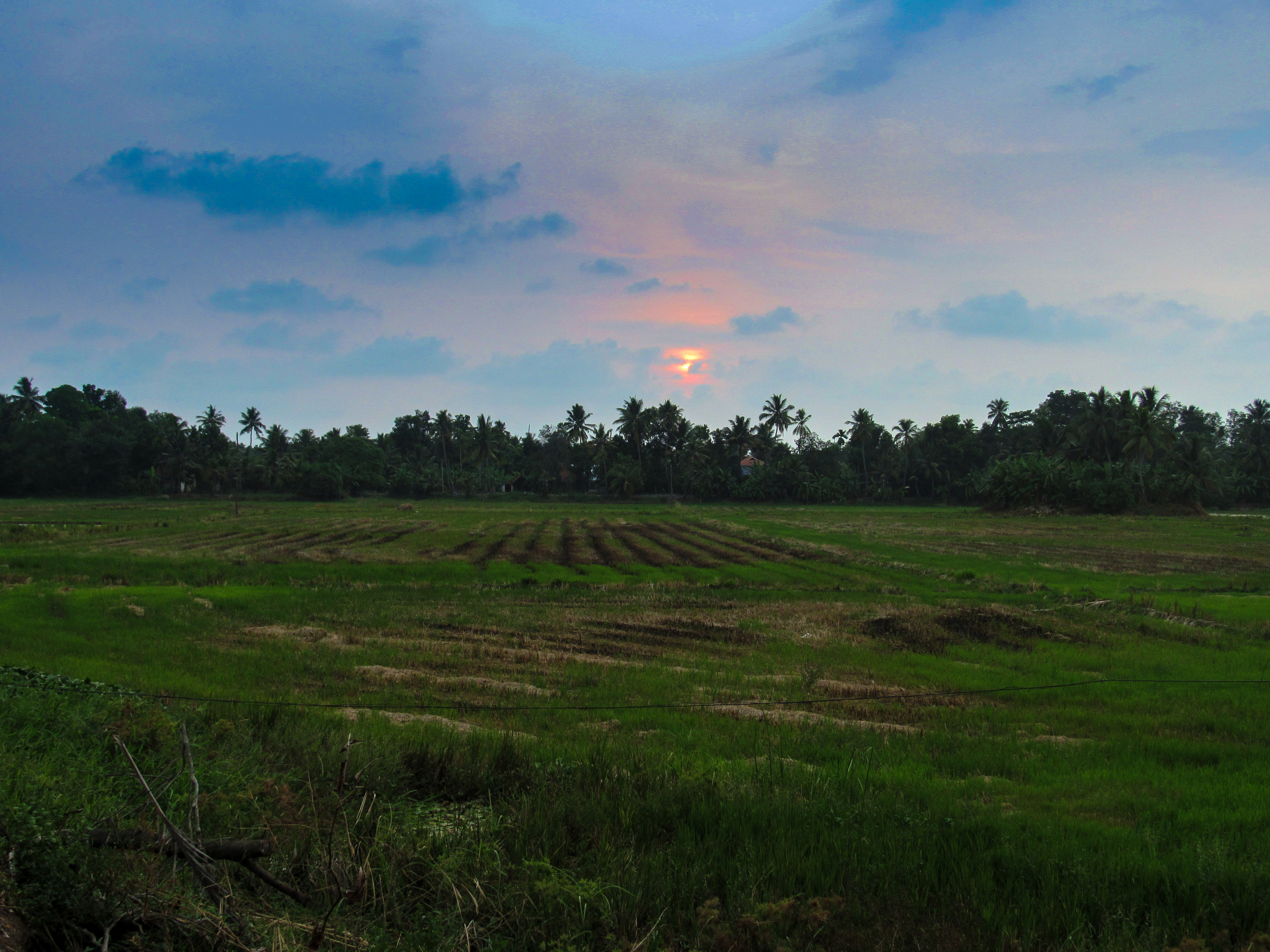
Sunset in paddy field

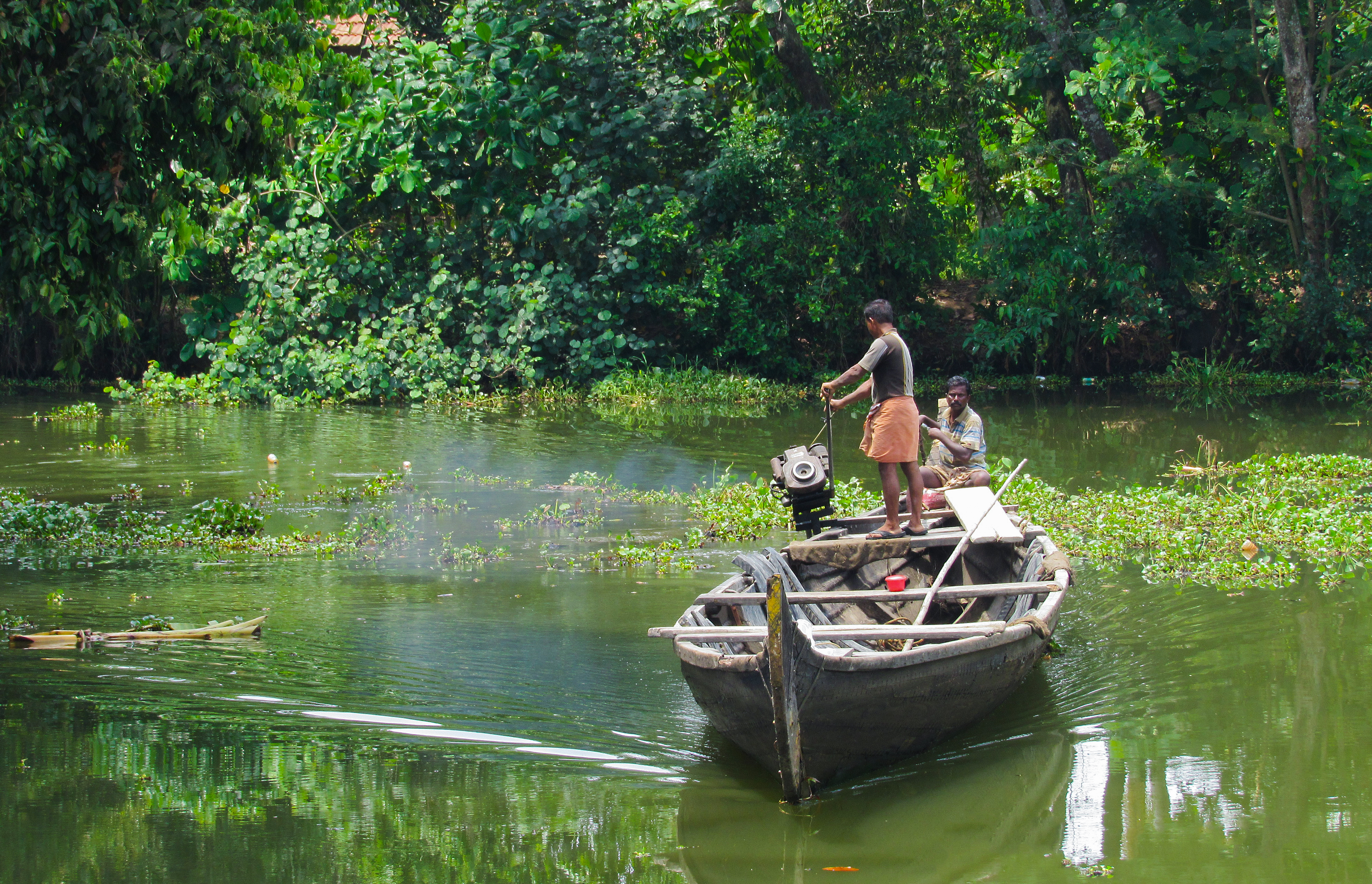
Kandankary boat

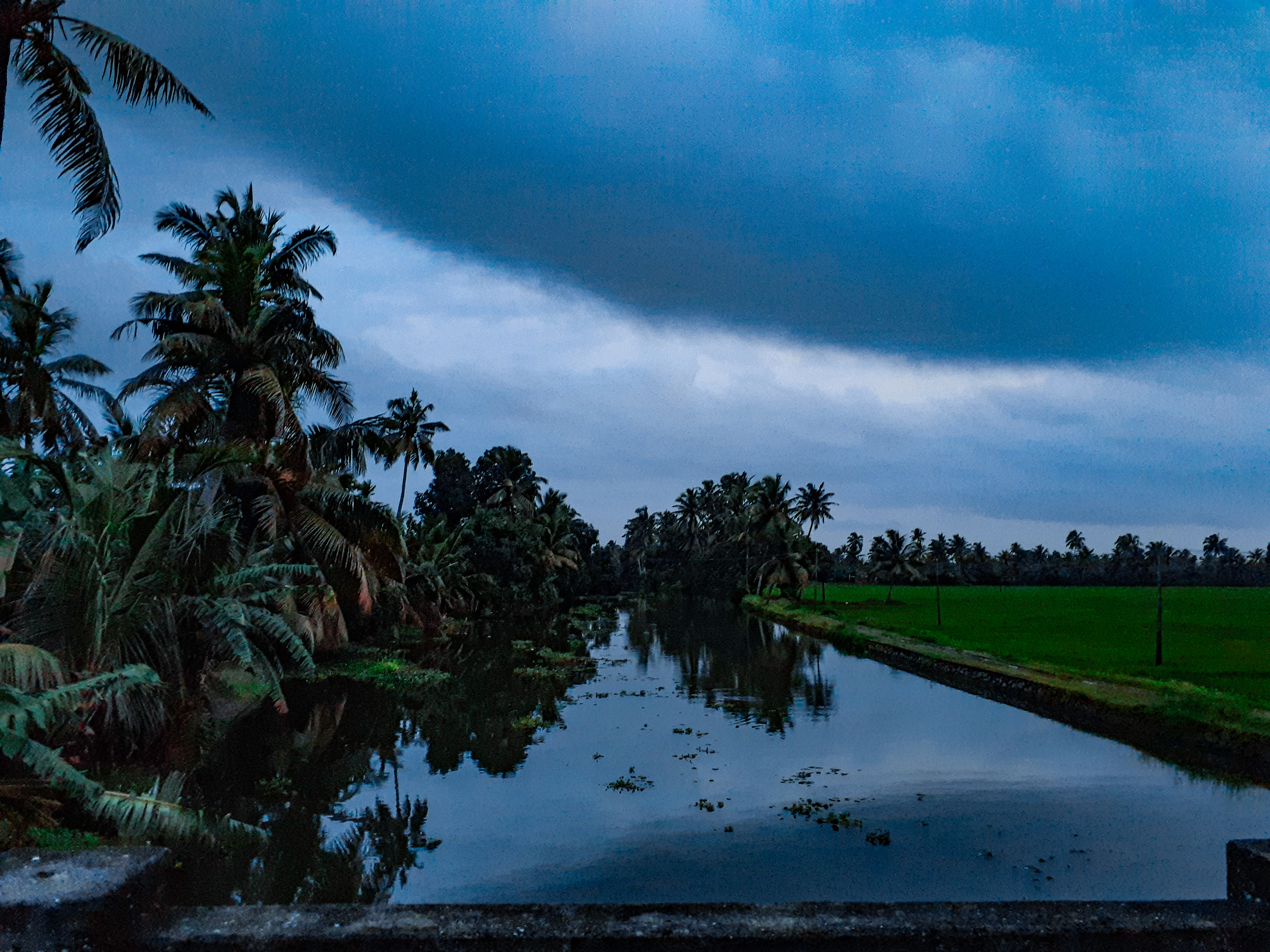

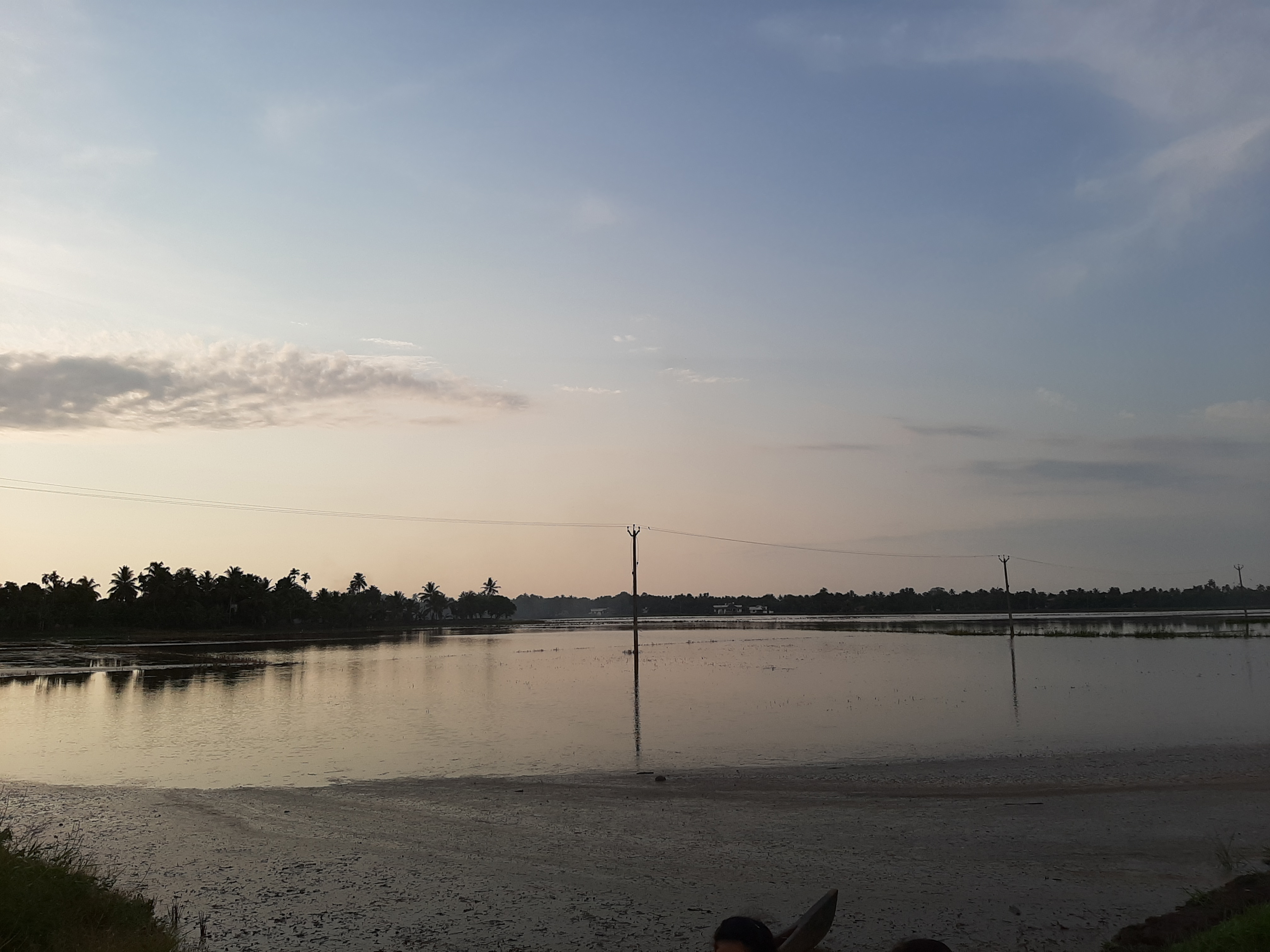
