= Mathoor Govindan Kutty =

Indian Kathakali dancer (1940–2021)

- Born: 5 October 1940; Nedumudi, Alappuzha district, British India
- Died: 4 February 2021 (aged 80); Kottayam, Kerala, India
- Occupation: Kathakali artist
- Known for: Kathakali Stri Vesham
- Awards: Sangeet Natak Akademi Award (2005); Kerala State Award for best Kathakali Artist (2011)

Mathoor Govindan Kutty (5 October 1940 – 4 February 2021) was an Indian Kathakali artist from the state of Kerala. In a career spanning over six decades, he specialized in Kathakali Stri Vesham, the portrayal of female characters on stage. He was the recipient of the 2011 Kerala State Award for the best Kathakali artist, 2010 Kerala Sangeetha Nataka Akademi Award and the 2005 Sangeet Natak Akademi Award for contributions to the Kathakali art form.

== Early life ==
Kutty was born Narayana Govinda Kunju Panicker on 5 October 1940 in the Nedumudi village in Alappuzha district to Karthyayani Kunajamma and Damodaran Namboodiri. His name was later changed to Mathoor Govindan Kutty. He graduated from high school in Mathoor and later moved to Kudamaloor (near Kottayam) after his wedding.

== Career ==
Kutty started his training in the classical South Indian dance and theater form, Kathakali, with Nedumudy Kuttappa Panicker at the age of 14 and went on to train under artists including Kurissi Kunjan Panicker, Ambalappuzha Shekharan at the Mathoor Kalari, a traditional Kerala arts training space. He later trained under Kudamaloor Karunakaran Nair at the Thekkan Chitta Gurukulam.

Under Nair's tutelage, he specialized in Kathakali Stri Vesham, or the portrayal of female characters, and would continue to do so through his career of over six decades. He credited Nair's portrayal of Damayanti as an inspiration for his choice of female characters. Some of his lead roles included performances with other prominent artists including Kalamandalam Gopi, Kalamandalam Krishnan Nair, and Mankulam Vishnu Namboothiri. Some of the popular characters that he portrayed included Damayanti in Nalacharitram (transl. A Good Character), Kunti in Karnasapatham (transl. Karna's Resolve), and Panchali in Duryodhana Vadham (transl. Duryodhana's Execution). As a teacher, he also trained many artists at the Kudamaloor Kalakendra (center for the arts). He also portrayed the role of Shiva in disguise as a hunter in Irattakkulangara Rama Varier's Kiratham. He also portrayed the role of Sukracharya in 19th century composer Thazhavana Govindan Asan's Devayaniswayamvaram (transl. Devayani's Swayamvara). In a review of his performance, The Hindu, called out his emoting and the subtle humor that he infused into his role. The same newspaper, in a review of his portrayal of Kripacharya in Utharaaswayamvaram (transl. Uthara's wedding) praised his delivery, and the conscious interspersing of acting with realism. He also portrayed the role of Narada in Balivijayam (transl. Bali's victory). Kutty made a switch towards portraying male characters in the latter portion of his career attributing it to advancing age.

He led the performance of Kudamaloor Kalamandram group at the opening ceremony of the 1982 Asian Games and at the 1993 Kathakali Mahotsav. In addition to performances in India, he had also performed internationally in England, France, and Germany. His last performance was two weeks before his death, where he portrayed the role of Kunti in Karnasapatham. Speaking later on his death, his contemporary, artist Kalamandalam Gopi, praised his proficiency and ease in portraying a wide range of characters in addition to calling to the role of imagination and improvisation that he brought along to his works.

Kutty was a recipient of the 2011 Kerala State Award for best Kathakali artist, 2010 Kerala Sangeetha Nataka Akademi Award and the 1993 Guru Chenganoor award. He was also the recipient of the Sangeet Natak Akademi Award for advancing his contributions to advancing the Kathakali art form. The citation from the Akademi called him "one of the foremost exponents" of the art form. Some of his other honors included the Kerala Kalamandalam award, Madavoor Vasudevan Nair award, and the Kerala Sahitya Akademi award. He was also a member of the governing body of the Kerala Sahitya Akademi, had held a central fellowship from the Union Government and was the recipient of the 2014 Kalamandalam fellowship. He was nominated by the Kerala state government for the Padma Shri, India's fourth highest civilian award in 2014.

== Personal life ==
Kutty was married to Rajeswari, his teacher Kudamaloor Karunakaran Nair's daughter, and had two sons. His wife died in 2011. He died on 4 February 2021, in Kottayam after a period of brief illness from COVID-19 during the COVID-19 pandemic in India. He was 81, and was cremated with state honors.
