= Moopil Nair =

Subgroup of the Nair caste

Moopil Nair, also transliterated Mooppil and Muppil, is a subgroup of the Samantan Nair caste. They were naduvazhis and desavazhis in the Malabar region, present-day Kerala state, South India, typically owing at least nominal allegiance to a superordinate Raja, despite frequently aggregating lands and political powers of sufficient scale so as to establish them as essentially autonomous monarchs in their own rights. Although Moopils frequently simply styled themselves as 'the' name of swaroopam/tharavadu Nair, virtually all were entitled to higher titular Nair rank.

Among them was Kavalappara Moopil Nair, who ruled the small kingdom of Kavalappara Swaroopam, and a nominal feudatory of the Vellattiri Raja of Valluvanad, himself a sometime Moopil Nair. Kavalappara holdings spanned some 155,358 acres of allodially freeheld jenmi lands, rendering them among Malabar's foremost jenmimars, alongside fellow Moopil Nairs such as the Mannarghat Nair, a feudatory of the Vallabha Velattiri Raja of Valluvanad, whose peak estates subsumed some 180,000 acres of Malabar lands, and Koothali Nair, whose total holdings are unknown, but whose rump holdings along as escheated to Malabar state amounted to some 53,000 acres who along with his cousin Payyormala Avinyat moopil nair ruled the kingdom of Payyormala with nominal allegiance to the Zamorin, Kurangoth Nair ruler of the small kingdom of Kurangoth vassal to Kolathiri, Pulavayil Nair ruler of pulavayil with nominal allegiance to Zamorin and Kutiravatathu moopil nair the cavalry chief of Zamorin .KT Moopil Nair had a landholding of 50,000 acres comprising both agricultural and forest land.

== Notable Moopil Nairs ==
- Kavalappara Moopil Nair
- Mannarghat Moopil Nair
- Mannur Moopil Nair
- Koothali Moopil Nair
- Blahayil Moopil Nair
- Kodakara Moopil Nair
- Kuppathode Moopil Nair
- Kuthiravattath Moopil Nair
- KT Moopil Nair
- Beypore Moopil Nair
- Velattiri Moopil Nair
- Kurangoth Moopil Nair
- Paleri Nair
- Payyormala Avinhat Nair
- Pulavayil Moopil Nair
- Alliyil Edathil Nair of pulavayil
- Mannil Edathil Nair of pulavayil
- Vazhathattil Moopil Nair
