= Guru Kunju Kurup =

Kathakali dancer from south Kerala

- Born: Central Travancore, Kerala
- Relatives: Perumanoor Gopinathan Pillai

Guru Kunju Kurup (1881–1970) was a Kathakali dancer from south Kerala, India.

== Life ==
Born in a Poypallilkulam family of Thakazhi village of Kuttanad in present-day Alappuzha district, Kurup was initiated into Kathakali at the age of 13 by his uncles Kochappi Panikker and Rama Panikker.

He later joined the famous Kaliyogam (repertory) of Mathur Kunhu Pillai Panikker, and subsequently had tutelage under gurus Champakulam Sankara Pillai and Thottam Sankaran Namboodiri. His grooming later under Vechur Ayyappa Kurup paved the way for his entry into the Kochi and Malabar belts.

Kunju Kurup's marriage with a relative of Palayil Karunakara Menon, a Kathakali exponent living near Palakkad in 1910, cemented his ties with central Kerala. Soon, he was made a tutor at the famous Kerala Kalamandalam following an invitation from its co-founder, poet Vallathol Narayana Menon. He later had brief stints as a Kathakali guru in Bangalore (1943) and Madras (or Chennai, in 1914, during which Mrinalini Sarabhai was his student), and later (1948–52) at Chembakassery Natana Kalamandalam in Ambalappuzha, his home territory.

Kurup was awarded the Padma Bhushan award of 1971. He tutord Kalamandalam Krishnan Nair. He succeeded in creating the fresh aesthetics of Kathakali acting-dancing through a sublime presentation of rasa and bhava abhinaya. Kurup was renowned for his varied roles like Nala, Hamsam (swan), Rugmangada, Arjuna and Krishna besides minukku veshams such as Kuchelan, Brahmanan and Sundara Brahmanan. He also excelled in anti-hero roles like Ravana and Keechaka, besides the black-bearded Kaatalan.

Kurup was honoured with the Sangeet Natak Akademi Award for Kathakali in 1956 for his unique contributions to the four-century old classical dance-drama from the southern Indian state. He also won the Central Sangeet Natak Akademi fellowship in 1969.
