= N. P. Chellappan Nair =

Indian writer

N. P. Chellappan Nair (1903–1972) was a playwright and short story writer from Kerala, India. He concentrated on sociopolitical satire. Of his 200 stories, thirty-one have been published in a separate volume. He received the Kerala Sahitya Akademi Award for Drama in 1961 for the play Iblisukalude Naattil.

== Personal life ==
N. P. Chaellappan Nair was born in 1903 in Mannar, a small town in what is now Alappuzha district of Indian state of Kerala. He died in 1972 at the age of 69.

== Works ==
=== Plays ===
- Pranaya Jambavan (1938)
- Lady Doctor (1940)
- Minnal Pranayam (1941)
- Vanakumari (1942)
- Lieutenant Nani (1946)
- Iblisukalude Naattil (I960)
- Ksheerabala (1966)
- Itiyum Minnalum
- Vikata Yogi
- Bhavana
- Nurse
- Minnal Pinarukal
- Aa Prakasham Poliyukayilla
- Vazhivilakkukal
- Devadasi
- N. G. O.
- Gangayum Yamunayum Onnuchernnozhukanam
- Mohangal, Mohabhangangal
- Kakkakalum Kakkathamoburattikalum

=== Short stories ===
- NPyude Charithrakathakal (Collection of 21 short stories)
- Ere Nerum Kure Nunayum
- Dasapushpangal

=== Films ===
N. P. Chellappan Nair wrote the screenplay and starred in K. Subrahmaniam's film Prahlada (1941). He also scripted the films, Chandrika (1950), Sasidharan (1950), Chechi (1951) and Athmasanthi (1964).
