= Guru Gopinath =

Indian actor-cum-dancer (1908–1987)

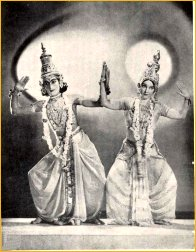
- Born: 24 June 1908; Central Travancore, Kerala
- Died: 9 October 1987 (aged 79)
- Known for: Kerala Natanam (Kerala Dance)
- Children: 4, including Vinodini Sasimohan, Venugopal
- Relatives: Guru Kunchu Kurup (uncle)

Perumanoor Gopinathan Pillai, more popularly known as Guru Gopinath (24 June 1908 – 9 October 1987), was a well known Indian actor-cum-dancer. He is well regarded as the greatest preserver of the dance tradition. He is a recipient of the Sangeet Natak Akademi Award, the Kerala Sangeetha Nataka Akademi Fellowship, and the Kerala Sangeetha Nataka Akademi Award.

== Significance ==
Guru Gopinath was well tempered by traditional discipline, but he expanded the framework of tradition. He was instrumental in introducing and popularising Kathakali, the illustrious dance drama of Kerala, lying in obscurity, to the outer world.

He is considered a key personality of Indian dancing in the 20th century like Uday Shankar. He carved out a contemporary style of dancing, classical in form but popular in appeal, through which the fame of Kathakali spread far and wide in the early 1930s.

He showed how Indian dancing could handle themes other an than those from Hindu mythology. Indian classical dance is the language of humanity, the global language. He popularised it by choreographing dance and ballets having biblical social current and political themes.

He was trained in both southern (Kaplingadan) and northern (Kalluvazhi) style of Kathakali. He was invited for higher studies when poet Vallathol Narayana Menon started Kerala Kalamandalam at Mulamkunnathukavu in Thrissur. He received training from masters in the field, such as Pattikkamthodi Ravunni Menon, Guru Kunchu Kurup and Guru Kavalappara Narayanan Nair. He studied Rasa Abhinaya under Natyaacharya Padma Shri Mani Madhava Chakkiyar. Famous Kathakali artist Kalamandalam Krishnan Nair and dancer Ananda Shivaram were then students in the first batch of Kalamandalam.

He was dance partner to Ragini Devi, formerly Esther Luella Sherman, an American-born dancer from Michigan. Guru Gopinath and Ragini Devi made their first stage performance in Mumbai in December 1932.

The success of this performance encouraged them for more stage shows and an all India tour, making performances and lecture- demonstrations on Indian classical dance. Kathakali and dancing were thus made popular, which was comprehensive to the layman and connoisseur alike.

When Rabindranath Tagore saw young Gopinath's performance in early thirties he wrote an appreciation on the dancer:

"Mr Gopinath is a real artist and I am sure there are not many who could rightfully take their stand by his side either in India or abroad. He brought to my mind glimpses of the great past when dancing was one of the most treasured arts in India and not as today, a mere device of whetting up the jaded appetite of the idle rich. His presence in our midst was a great lesson and now that dancing is again coming into vogue amongst us, his style should give us a correct lead, for in want of it, we are yet groping in the dark."

He was awarded the Veera Srumkhala from, Chithira Thirunal Balarama Varma the King of Travancore. The Guru Status was awarded later by Indian People's Theatre Association (IPTA). The Rabindra Bharathi University honoured him with a doctorate. His statue was erected in Viswa Bharathi University. His illustrious demonstration of Nava Rasa (the nine emotions) is featured in major museums in US, France, Germany and Switzerland.

Kathakali style of dancing and training was a male monopoly. It was Guru Gopinath who experimented and proved that females can perform Kathakali. He was appointed as the palace dancer and principal of the dance institution run by the royal family. The Natananiketan in Chennai and the Viswa Kala Kendra in Trivandrum the International Kathakali Centre in Delhi were institutions founded by him.

Malayalam film history has noted Guru Gopinath as one among the actors of the beginning years. He has acted in the movie Prahlada as Hiranyakasipu. This was the sixth Malayalam movie and the third movie having sound tracks.

He has made guest appearances as Jesus Christ in Jeevithanauka and Poothana in Bhakathakuchela.

Guru Gopinath was one artist who could show the nine emotions in Kathakali and along with different emotions on each half of his face at the same time.

He died on stage, as he wished, with makeup, attire and anklets while enacting the role of King Dasharatha in his famous ballet Ramayana on 9 October 1987 at Fine Arts Hall Eranakulam.

The Kerala government has established a dance village named 'Guru Gopinath Natanagramam in Trivandrum. The Natanagramam has a 3-storey dance museum dedicated to him.

Guru Gopinath has travelled and performed in many parts of the world. He made performances in US, erstwhile USSR and Sri Lanka. He was a member of the first cultural delegation of independent India to the USSR in 1954. Among them was the great Indian Dancer Tara Chaudhri, the only North Indian born dancer performing dances from the south. He was invited as a judge of Classical Dances in the Eighth World Youth Festival held at Helsinki, Finland in 1961.

== Early years ==
Guru Gopinath's family the 'Perumanoor tharavad' has two hundred years of tradition in Kathakali. The Kathakali artist Champakkulam Paachu Pillai, who was known for his performance in thaadi and kaththi roles in Kathakali, was his elder brother. Bheeman Paramu Pillai alias Unda Paramu Pillai, a court dancer (kathakali) of Travancore was his maternal grandfather.

He was born on 24 June 1908, as the second son of Madhavi Amma and Kaippilli Sankara Pillai, in Champakulam, Kuttanad now in Alappuzha district of Kerala. There were many exponents of Kaplingadan style of 'Kathakali' in this family like Champakkulam Paramu Pillai and Champakkulam Shanku Pillai. Great Kathakali master Guru Kunchu Kurup is related to this family.

His initiation to Kathakali arangu (stage) was accidental. When he was a child once he had gone with his paternal uncle for a Kathakali show performed by his troupe. The show was on and at midnight suddenly uncle came to the sleeping boy and did some minimum make up to him to look like a maharshi – a hermit – and asked him to sit on a chair on the stage. He instructed him to hand over the bows and arrows when a man with glittering headgear comes and bestow him. He did exactly as told by uncle. That was Guru Gopinath's first appearance in a Kathakali show.

Great masters of Kathakali like Champakkulam Paramu Pillai, Mathoor Kunjupilla Panicker, and Thakazhi Kesava Panicker at Champakkulam were his teachers for the initial years, where he had undergone training in southern style of acting in kathakali, which gives importance to abhinaya.

Kavalappara Narayanan Nair was his main teacher at 'Kerala Kalamandalam' where he was asked to join as a special student for higher studies in northern style, which gives importance to gestures movements and footsteps. Guru Kunchu Kurup taught him lessons in Abhinaya(acting). Later he went and stayed with Chenganoor Raman Pillai an expert in southern style, to learn more about Kathakali.

== Family ==
Guru Gopinath was married to Mulakkal Thankamani Amma, a great Mohiniyattam dancer and exponent of Kerala Natanam. She was the first student of Mohiniyattam at Kerala Kalamandalam in early 30s, when Poet Vallathol Narayana Menon and Manakkulam Mukunda Raja started a course to revive this dying art form. After marriage she became co-dancer and partner of Gopinath. Her relentless support of her husband was significant to his achievement.

They had four children. Their eldest daughter is Vasanthi Jayaswal, a dancer and social worker. She is an exponent of Kerala Natanam & Bharatanatyam and is a teacher of shastras in USA. Their second daughter was Vilasini Ramachandran, a Senior I.A.S. officer in Gujarat (She died on 5 March 2015). The youngest daughter Vinodini Sasimohan was a child artist in Malayalam movies in the 60s and she is now the Chief Administrative Officer of Viswa Kala Kendra, Trivandrum. G. Venugopal is his only son.

== Kerala Natanam (Kerala Dance) ==
He made "Kathakali" more accessible to teachers, students and audience. He brought some innovative changes to make a new style of dancing from this ancient dance form known as 'Oriental dance', 'Kathakali Natanam' and later 'Kerala Natanam' (Keralanatanam), without sacrificing its essence and classicism.

Kerala Natanam can be called a stylised form of Kathakali. Guru Gopinath developed his own style that was appealing to the masses who were then devoid of art and dance, without compromising on the classical background. He never tried to reform Kathakali and to tamper with the originality and purity it possessed.

He was instrumental to bring Kathakali out from the courtyards of upper class Brahmins and Nairs and rajas and dance chambers of temples to the masses. His performances created a dance wave in Kerala, which had reprecations all over India in thirties and forties

Ordinary people in India, who had no training knowledge in understanding classical dance started enjoying it and appreciating it, only after they had the opportunity of watching Gopinath perform.

== Ramlila and Ramayana ballet ==
Guru Gopinath was an exponent of various styles of Indian dances. The illustrious 'Raam Leela' of Delhi, choreographed and directed by him. His last choreography 'Ramaayana' ballet was the most popular one, which was staged more than 1500 times in various parts of Kerala.

== Books ==
Guru Gopinath has written books in Malayalam and English, which explain theory and practise of Indian and Kerala dances. Two books are in English- The classical Dance poses of India and Abinaya Prakashika (with Sanskrit slokas).

Other books are:

- Kathakali Natanam (kathakali dancing)
- Natanakairali (Kerala dance)
- Thalavum Natanavum (rhythm and dancing)
- Abhinayamkuram (The beginning of Acting)
- Abhinaya prakashika (The Expressions of Acting)
