= Prahlada (film) =

Prahladan
- Directed by: K. Subramaniam
- Written by: Devotional
- Screenplay by: N. P. Chellappan Nair
- Produced by: Madras United Artist Corporation
- Starring: T. K. Balachandran; N. P. Chellappan Nair; Guru Gopinath; Thankamani Gopinath; Kumari Lakshmi
- Music by: Vidwan V. S. Parthasarathy Ayyankar
- Release date: 17 August 1941
- Country: India
- Language: Malayalam

Prahlada is a 1941 Indian Malayalam-language film, directed by K. Subramaniam and produced by Madras United Artist Corporation. The film stars T. K. Balachandran, N. P. Chellappan Nair, Guru Gopinath, Thankamani Gopinath and Kumari Lakshmi. The film's score was composed by Vidwan V. S. Parthasarathy Ayyankar. The movie is a remake of Prahalada, a Tamil film released in 1939. It is the first devotional film in Malayalam, and the debut Malayalam film of director-producer K. Subramaniam, actor T. K. Balachandran and music director V. S. Parthasarathy Iyengar. It was also the debut film of Guru Gopinath and Thankamani Gopinath.

It is a retelling of the Hindu mythological story of Prahlada and his devotion to the god Maha Vishnu.

== Cast ==
- T. K. Balachandran
- N. P. Chellappan Nair as Sukracharya
- Guru Gopinath as Hiranyakasipu
- Thankamani Gopinath as Kayathu
- Satyajeet Singh
- Kumari Lakshmi as Prahlada
