= Vaisyambhagom =

Village in Alappuzha District, Kerala, India

Coordinates: 9.409°N 76.388°E

Vaisyambhagom is a village in Kuttanadu Taluk in Alleppey District in Kerala. River Pookaitha, a branch of River Pamba flows on the north and west side of the village. Vaisyambhagom is bordered by the Nadubhagom village on the east and by the Chempumpuram village on the north. Kanjippadom is on the western side of the river Pookaitha (Pamba River) and Karumady on the south.

The village Vaisyambhagom is in Kuttanadu taluk and in Nedumudy panchayath. Politically, Vaisyambhagom is a ward in the Nedumudy Grama panchayat. It is part of Kuttanadu Legislative assembly constituency.

== Important institutions ==
- Government Lower Primary School vaisyambhagom.
- BBM High School vaisyambhagom
- Edakkadu Devi temple vaisyambhagom
- Holy Cross Church, vaisyambhagom
- saint Antony's Syro Malabar Church vaisyambhagom
- Sahrudaya Library and Reading Room Vaisyamabhagom
