= Mannarghat Nair =

Mannarghat Muppil Nair (Kunnattattil Madambil Nair) was the royal title usually given to the eldest male member of Mannarghat Muppil Nair family, in whom the Mannarghat jenmi estates and feudatory obligations to the Velattiri Raja of Valluvanad alike vested.

He was a "desavazhi" (provincial governor) under Valluvanad (southern Malabar, India), looking after the eastern boundary and the hilly areas. The Nairs had considerable land holdings in the area and also held about 70% of the land in Attappadi, including Silent Valley. Their peak landholdings reached approximately 180,000 acres.

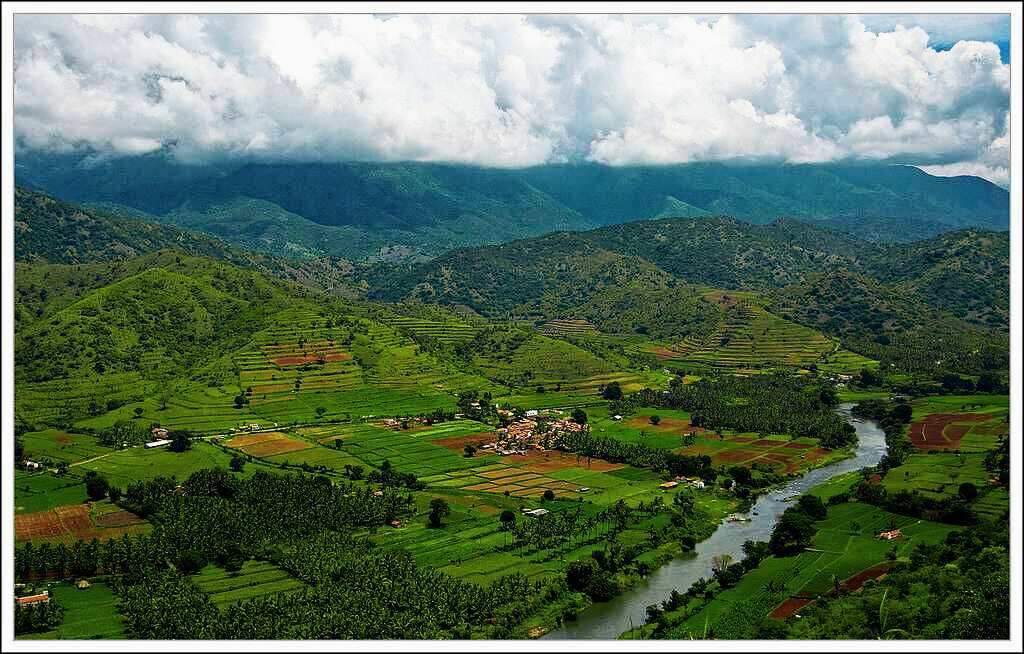
The Attapady hills, which accounted for the bulk of the Mannarghat estates.

== See also ==
- Muppil Nayar
