= Kottathara =

- village
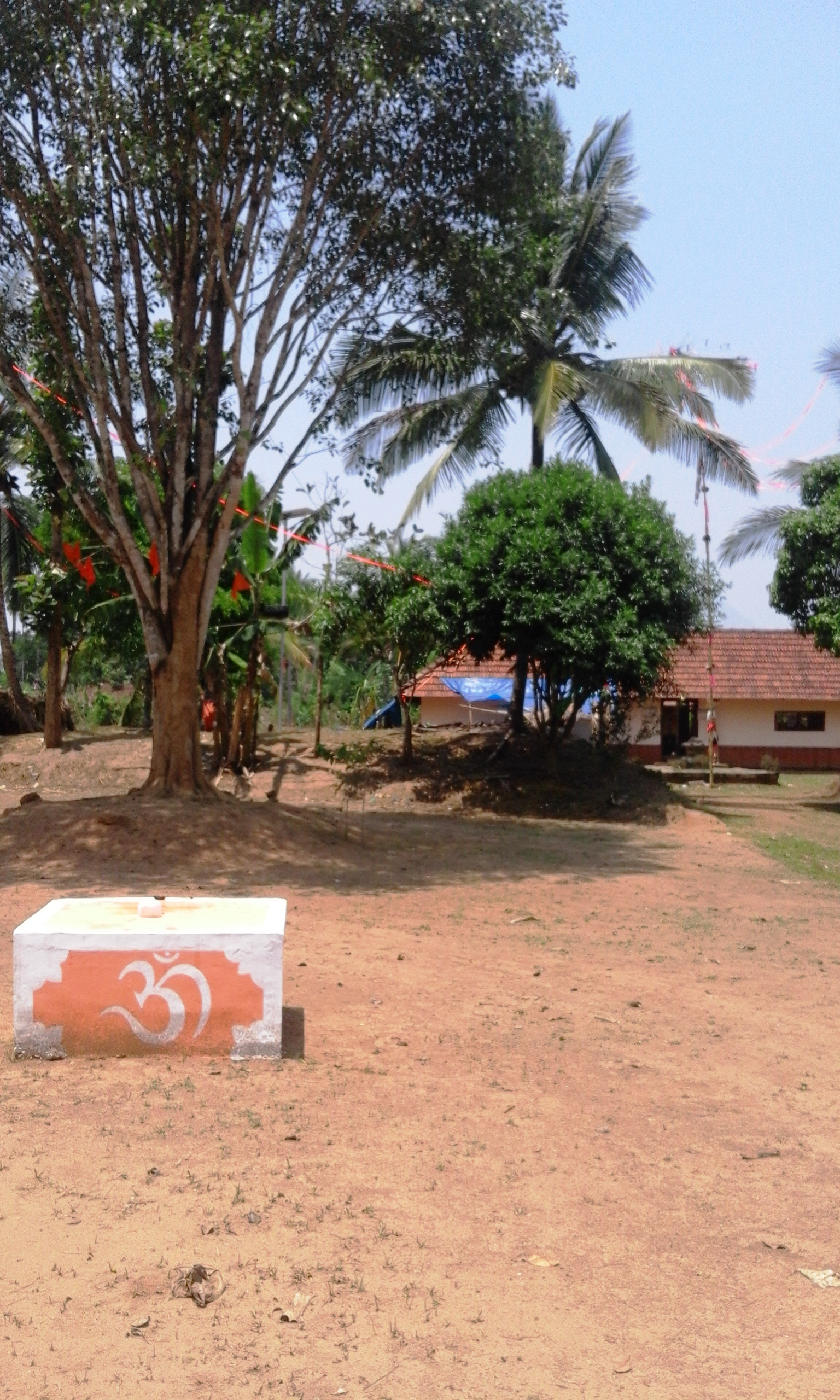
- Paradhevatha Kavu, Venniyode
- Interactive map of Kottathara
- Coordinates: 11.65636°N 76.02496°E
- Country: India
- State: Kerala
- District: Wayanad

Languages
  - Official: Malayalam, English
- Time zone: UTC+5:30 (IST)
- PIN: 673122
- ISO 3166 code: IN-KL

Kottathara or Venniyode is a gram panchayat in Wayanad district, Kerala State, India.

== Location ==
Kottathara is located near Padinjarathara. Venniyode is a small township which is located on the link road between Kamblakkad and Padinjarathara. Valal is the nearest village from Venniode Junction.

Venniyode Junction is the headquarters of Kottathara village.

== Location ==
=== Gallery ===
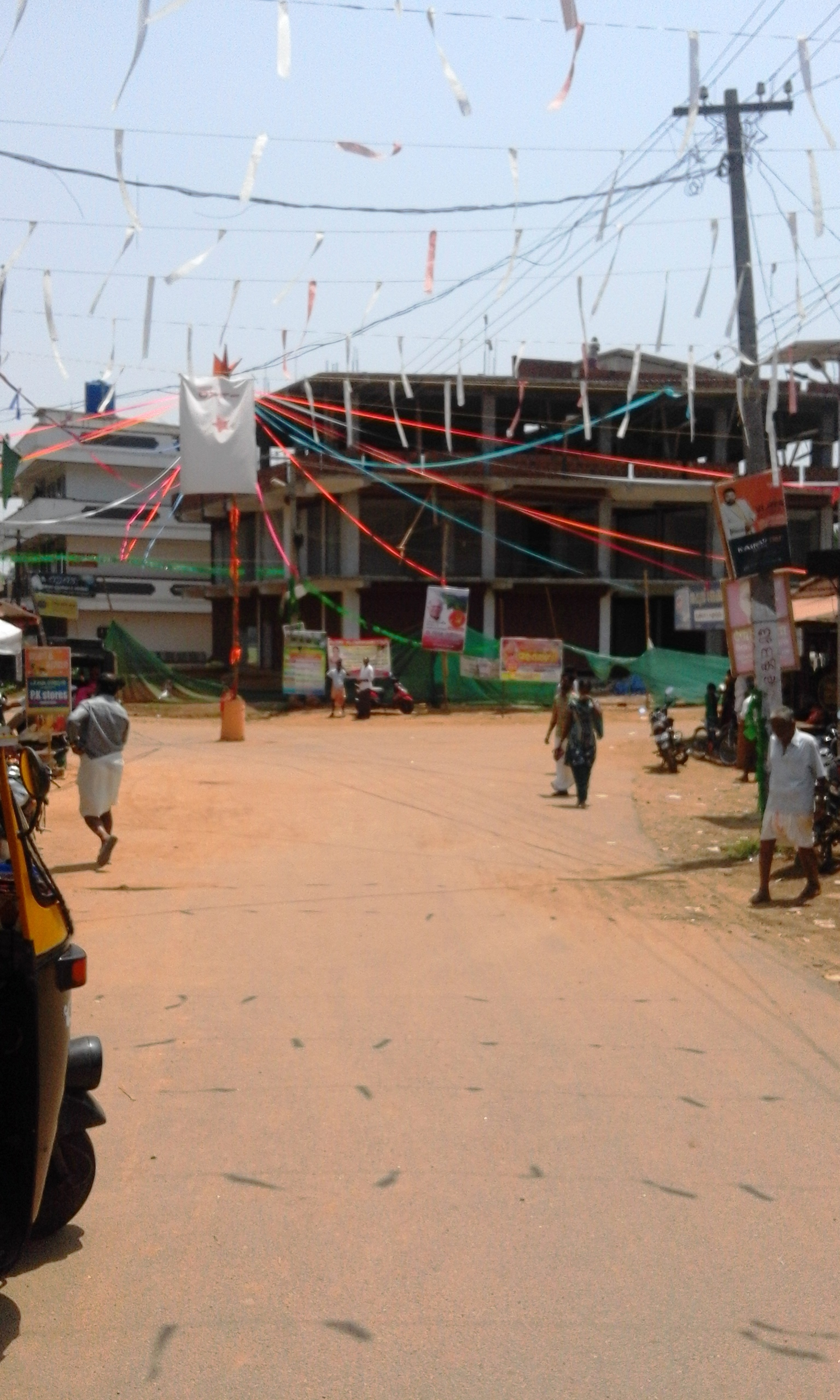
Venniyode Junction

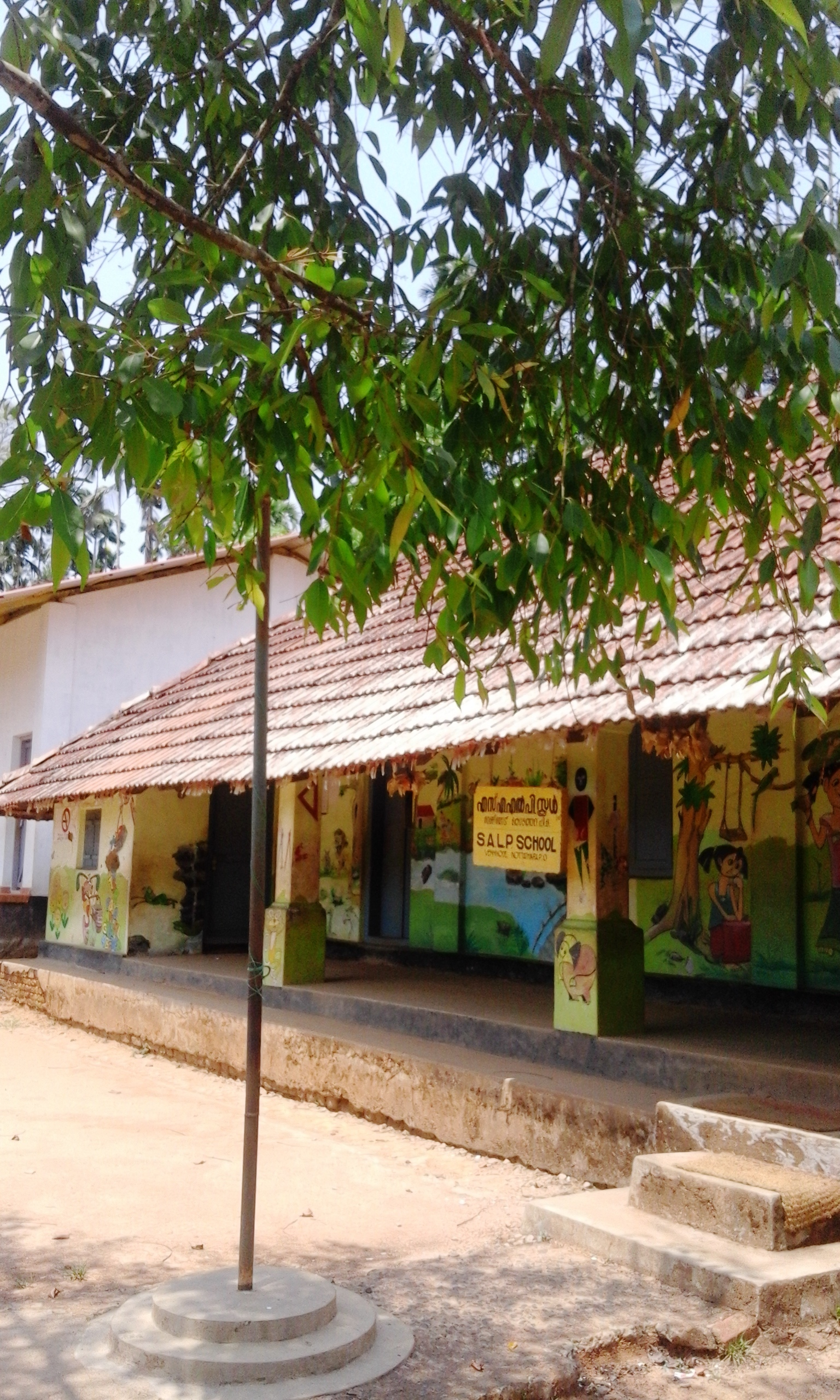
The old school at Venniyode
