= Kavalappara Nair =

Feudal class in medieval Kerala, India

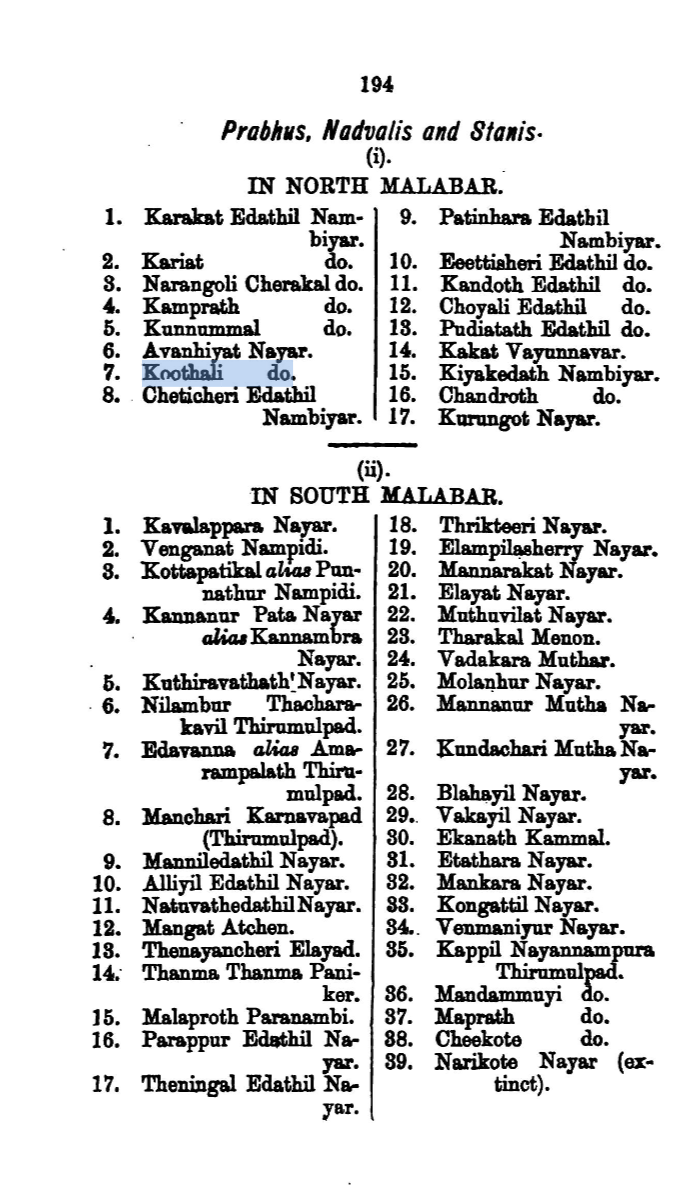
Elite sthanams in Malabar, including the Kavalappara at the head of the Southern tables

The Kavalappara is an princely Indian Nair tharavad or swaroopam, whose estates and powers vested in the matrilineally-mediated succession to and from each Kavalappara Nair, who headed the family and held the rank of Moopil Nair. In medieval Kerala, they served as part of the jenmi, or allodially landed nobility, and were sworn to the service of the rajas of the area, first that of Palghat and then later that of Cochin. Based at Kavalappara Desam in Karakkat, Valluvanada, their holdings extended to areas such as Kailiad and Panayur, ultimately compassing some 155,358 acres of jenmom estates, and ranking preeminent among the jenmimars of Malabar.

== Early history ==
The Kavalappara Moopil Nayar, also known as the Karakkattu Kumaran Raman, were one of the four chiefly dynasties or perumpata nayar of ancient Nedunganad. They became independent from the chieftainship of Nedungethiri in the 15th century, soon after the arrival of the Zamorin of Calicut to Nedunganad. Based at Eruppe Desam near Karakkat, Nedunganad, their holdings included some ninety-six villages.

== Nedunganad ==
Nedunganad, one of the seventeen districts during the Chera regime of Kodungallur, was situated between Kalladikkodan hills to the seashore villages of Ponnani-Purang. The chieftain of Nedunganad, known as Nedungethirippad, was an inefficient ruler. Kavalappara Nayar with other three (Thrikkateeri Nayar, Vattakkavil and Veettikkad nayars) became more powerful than Nedungethiri. Nedungethiri asked the help of the Zamorin of Calicut. The procession of the Eralppad was known as kottichezhunnallathu. The Zamorin built a palace at Karimpuzha. This was happened soon after 1487. It was the same Zamorin who, later, in 1498, met with Vasco da Gama. When the Zamorin's procession reached Karimpuzha, the three Nayar chiefs of Nedunganad, came and received him. Kavalappara refused to attend the meeting of the Eralppad at Karimpuzha. He declared independence and asked the help of Cochin. He was so fortunate, because his land was situated on the banks of River Nila, adjacent to the boundary of the King of Cochin.

== Mythology and medieval history ==
The family are Moopil Nairs and claim to be descendants of Karakalamma, a child of Vararuchi, a Brahmin saint, and a Pulayar woman. Through this association, they also share kinship with the Kadambur Brahmins and the two communities recognise their shared ancient heritage in occasional rituals. The Kavalapparas also claim to have been independent chieftains from the later stages of the Chera dynasty until the arrival of the Zamorin of Calicut in 1748, although this is not historically accurate. K. K. N. Kurup, a historian of the Malabar region, notes that absence of their name from highly detailed documents of the period indicates that they were no more than "dependent landed aristocracy", variously of the rajas of Palghat and of Cochin. They were naduvazhi of the raja of Palghat, meaning that they were a form of feudatory governor who inherited their role, which included some political powers, but were subservient to him.

During the period when clashes between the Zamorin of Calicut and the king of Cochin were common, which coincided with the arrival of Europeans in the area, the Kavalapparas were able to exploit the uncertainty and unrest to their advantage. They successfully fought in an alliance with forces from the kingdom of Travancore against the Zamorin and by around 1760 they had reached a deal with the kingdom whereby they gained independence from interference in return for ceding to it a monopoly of the pepper growing on family properties. Unhampered by the objections previously raised by the Zamorin and by the raja of Cochin, they constructed a kottaram as a physical symbol of their independence. This residence took a form common to the royal family of Travancore and thus different from the kovilakam palaces that traditionally belied the status of Malabar rulers. Thereafter, the Kavalapparas and the royal house of Travancore retained close ties and it was to Travancore that the family fled when the Mysorean occupation of Malabar dispossessed them of their properties.

The Kavalappara joined with Kesava Pillai and forces of the East India Company (EIC) in the Third Anglo-Mysore War, supplying both soldiers and grain. In recognition of this, Pillai, who was Diwan of Travancore and acting for the Bombay Presidency, reinstated their position as chieftains. A dispute arose because this arrangement contradicted one made around the same time between the king of Cochin and the Madras Presidency, which allowed for the king to have control of the Kavalappara territories. In 1792, the Kavalappara chieftain — who was seeking reinstatement in Kavalappara itself and in Edatara, Kongad and Mannur — was given a one-year reinstatement in a subordinate role by a Joint Commission instituted by the EIC in the Bombay Presidency. This was challenged by the king of Cochin, who said that the Kavalappars were his "acknowledged dependent[s]" and paid tribute to him, but the arrangement was continued with some financial amendments in 1793.

The traditional system of land tenancies and land ownership in Malabar, known as janmi, had resulted in a small number of families owning most of the land. The EIC had determined to use a slightly modified form of the existing janmi administrative processes to collect revenue. Under this modified system, the janmis were granted leases on land and were responsible for collecting revenue — almost entirely based on a proportion of agricultural produce — on behalf of the EIC. The janmis, such as the Kavalapparas, sublet to tenants known as kanakkarans, who had some security of tenure, and both could sublet to verumpattakkars, who were tenants-at-will. (Note: One of the modifications gave the janmis the power to evict tenants at the expiry of a lease, which now generally ran for 12 years in the case of kanakkarans and for a year in the case of verumpattakkars.) Thus, in 1794, the EIC granted the Kavalappara family a quinquennial lease on lands but it also disbarred from the feudal privileges of collecting death taxes from the Mappilas and some festival offerings from the ryots. All revenue collecting responsibilities were lost in 1796 when they were transferred to direct control of the EIC, although the EIC did return a portion of the funds collected by the system of malikhana that recognised the loyalty of certain ruling families. In common with many of his peers, the Kavalappara chieftain had amassed considerable arrears in revenue monies that he was supposed to hand over and as a result of the transfer of revenue collection he now became nothing more than a landed aristocrat without political influence. Some feudal rights were retained, notably of control over some temples, but by the end of the nineteenth century the family estates were being administered by the Court of Wards and remained so until 1910.

== Today ==
Today the traditional eight-acre palace complex that was long the seat of the Kavalappara Nair is mostly in ruin, with many core palace structures demolished or destroyed by storms. The present complex retains only the Oottupura or ceremonial banqueting hall, the Agraśālā, and the 'stepped mansion' complex, all of which are in derelict condition.

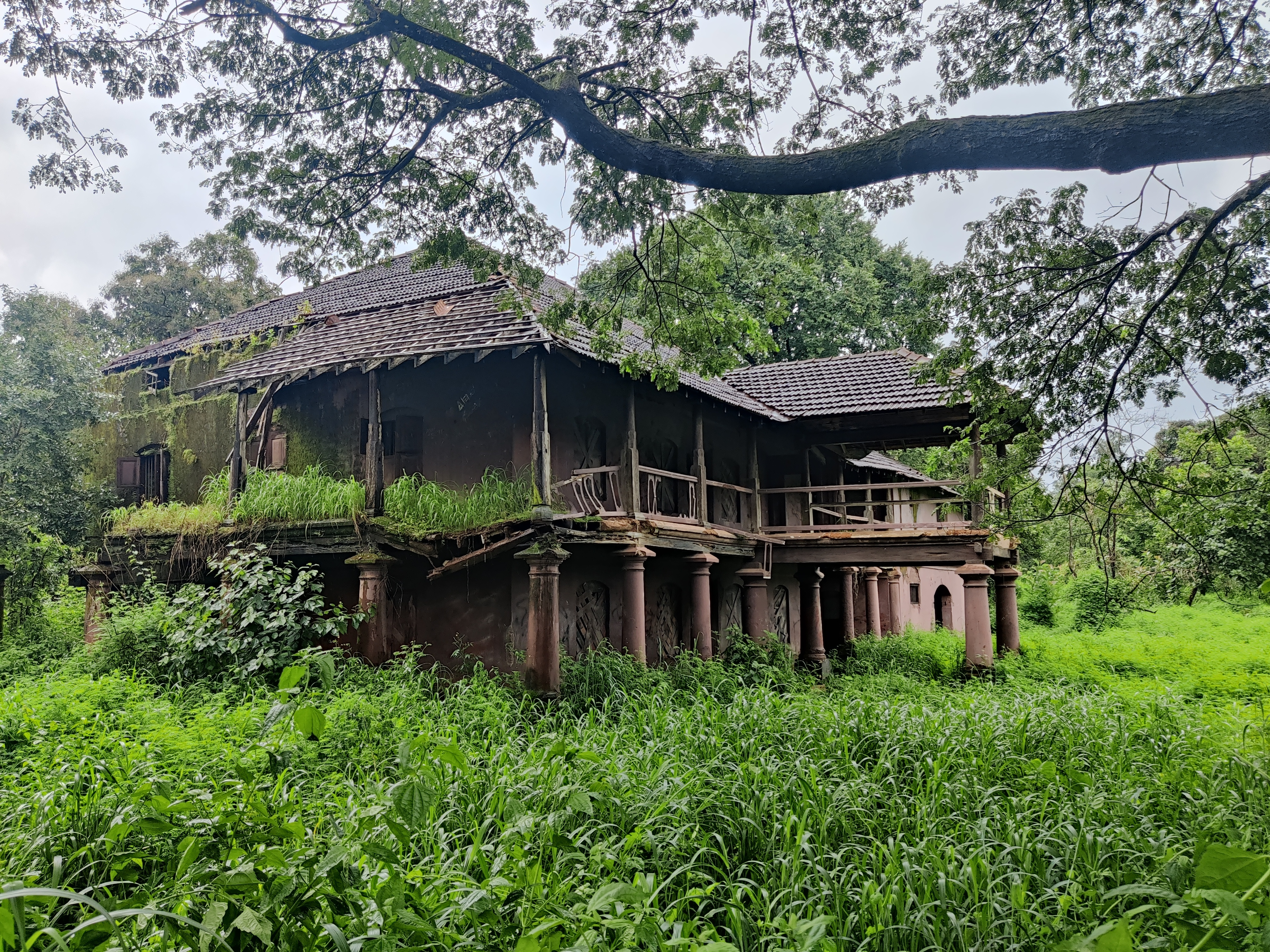
portions of the Kavalappara kottaram palace complex in ruins, in 2022

== See also ==
- History of Kerala
