= Ambalappuzha Assembly constituency =

Constituency of the Kerala legislative assembly in India

Coordinates: 9.38°N 76.36°E

Ambalappuzha
- Constituency No. 105 for the Kerala Legislative Assembly
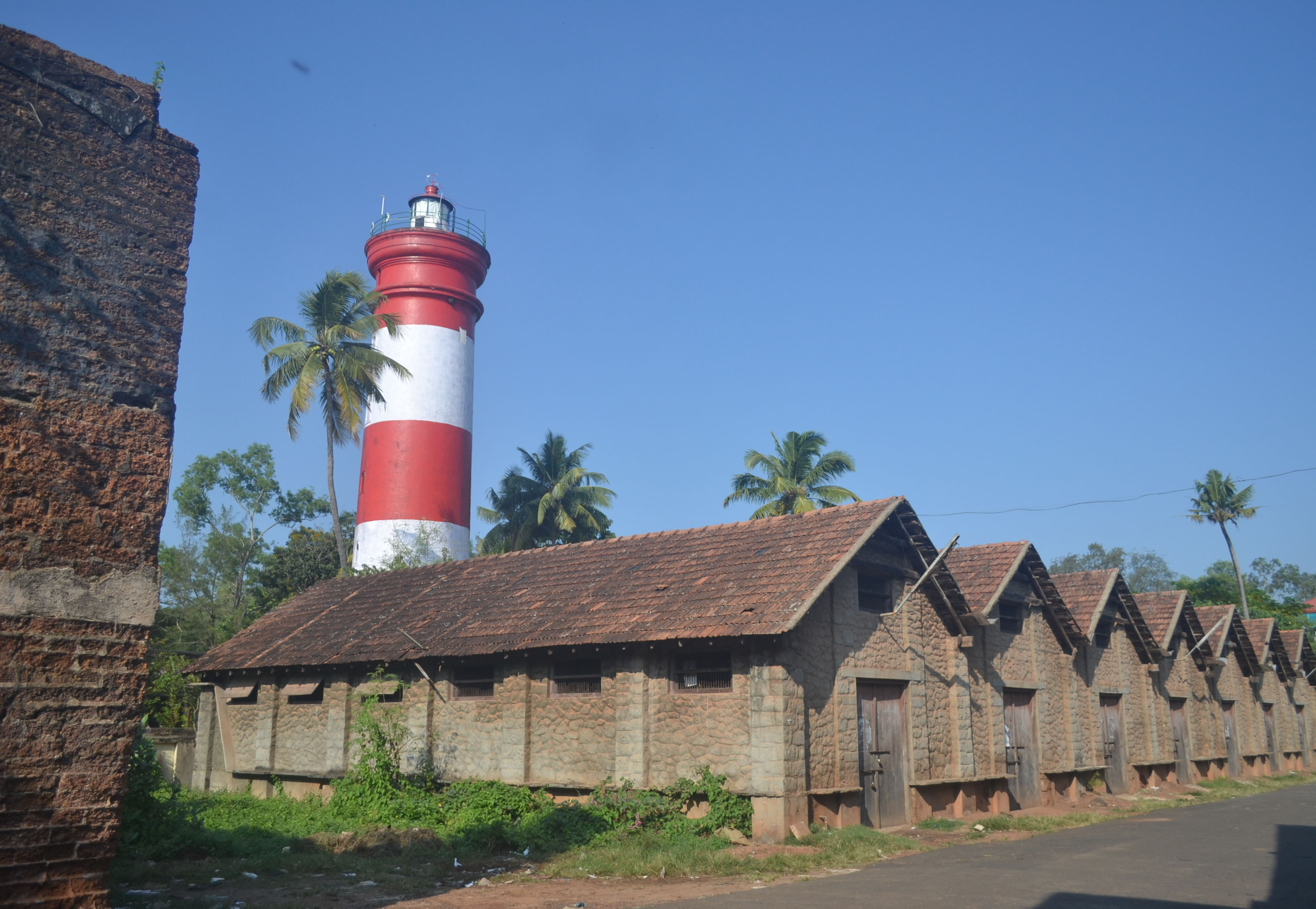
- Alappuzha Lighthouse

Constituency details
- Country: India
- Region: South India
- State: Kerala
- District: Alappuzha
- Lok Sabha constituency: Alappuzha
- Established: 2008
- Total electors: 1,78,623 (2021)
- Reservation: None

Member of Legislative Assembly
- 16th Kerala Legislative Assembly
- Incumbent G. Sudhakaran
- Party: Independent
- Alliance: UDF
- Elected year: 2026

Ambalappuzha State assembly constituency is one of the 140 state legislative assembly constituencies in Kerala in southern India. It is also one of the seven state legislative assembly constituencies included in Alappuzha Lok Sabha constituency. The current MLA is G. Sudhakaran of the UDF alliance.

== Local self-governed segments ==
Ambalappuzha Assembly constituency is composed of the following local self-governed segments:

Name	Status (Grama panchayat/Municipality)	Taluk	Ruling Alliance
Parts of Alappuzha	Municipality	Ambalappuzha	UDF
Ambalapuzha North	Grama panchayat	Ambalappuzha	LDF
Ambalapuzha South	Grama panchayat	Ambalappuzha	LDF
Punnapra North	Grama panchayat	Ambalappuzha	LDF
Punnapra South	Grama panchayat	Ambalappuzha	UDF
Purakkad	Grama panchayat	Ambalappuzha	UDF

== Members of Legislative Assembly ==
The following list contains all members of Kerala Legislative Assembly who have represented the constituency:

Key

CPI(M) INC Independent RSP

Election	Niyama Sabha	Member	Party	Tenure
1967	3rd	V. S. Achuthanandan	CPI(M)	1967 – 1970
1970	4th	V. S. Achuthanandan	CPI(M)	1970 – 1977
1977	5th	K. K. Kumara Pillai	RSP	1977 – 1980
1980	6th	P. K. Chandrananandan	CPI(M)	1980 – 1982
1982	7th	V. Dinakaran	Independent	1982 – 1987
1987	8th	V. Dinakaran	INC	1987 – 1991
1991	9th	C. K. Sadasivan	CPI(M)	1991 – 1996
1996	10th	Susheela Gopalan	CPI(M)	1996 – 2001
2001	11th	D. Sugathan	INC	2001 – 2006
2006	12th	G. Sudhakaran	CPI(M)	2006 – 2011
2011	13th	G. Sudhakaran	CPI(M)	2011 – 2016
2016	14th	G. Sudhakaran	CPI(M)	2016 - 2021
2021	15th	H. Salam	CPI(M)	2021-2026
2026	16th	G. Sudhakaran	UDF	2026-

== Election results ==
Percentage change (±%) denotes the change in the number of votes from the immediate previous election.

=== 2026 ===
There were 1,71,265 registered voters in the constituency for the 2026 Kerala Assembly election.

2026 Kerala Legislative Assembly election: Ambalappuzha
Party	Candidate	Votes	%	±%
Independent	G. Sudhakaran	75,184	53.40	
CPI(M)	H. Salam	47,249	33.56	
BJP	Arun Anirudhan	16,348	11.61	
SUCI(C)	Johnson Mathew	1,020	0.72	
NOTA	None of the above	980	0.70	
Margin of victory		27,935	19.84	
Turnout		1,38,499	80.86	▲4.15
UDF gain from CPI(M)		Swing		

By local self-governed segment:

Status (Local bodies)	Lead
Alappuzha	UDF
Punnapra North	UDF
Punnapra South	UDF
Ambalappuzha North	UDF
Ambalappuzha South	UDF
Purakkad	UDF

=== 2021 ===
There were 1,78,623 registered voters in the constituency for the 2021 Kerala Assembly election.

2021 Kerala Legislative Assembly election: Ambalapuzha
Party	Candidate	Votes	%	±%
CPI(M)	H. Salam	61,365	44.79	▼2.53
INC	M. Liju	50,240	36.67	▲6.33
BJP	Anoop Antony	22,389	16.34	▼0.71
SDPI	M. M. Thahir	1,690	1.23	▲0.01
NOTA	None of the above	591	0.43	−
WPOI	Subadramma Thottappally	525	0.38	▼0.28
SUCI(C)	Subaida	221	0.16	▼0.92
Margin of victory		11,125	8.12	▼8.86
Turnout		1,37,021	76.71	▼2.19
CPI(M) hold		Swing	▼2.53	

By local self-governed segment:

Status (Local bodies)	Lead
Alappuzha	LDF
Punnapra North	LDF
Punnapra South	LDF
Ambalappuzha North	LDF
Ambalappuzha South	LDF
Purakkad	UDF

=== 2016 ===
There were 1,68,949 registered voters in the constituency for the 2016 Kerala Assembly election.

2016 Kerala Legislative Assembly election: Ambalapuzha
Party	Candidate	Votes	%	±%
CPI(M)	G. Sudhakaran	63,069	47.32	▼7.16
JD(U)	Shaik P. Harriz	40,448	30.34	▼9.97
BJP	L. P. Jayachandran	22,730	17.05	▲14.77
SDPI	K. S. Shan	1,622	1.22	▼0.36
SUCI(C)	R. Arjunan	1,439	1.08	▲0.73
Independent	Nassar M. Pygamadom	1,053	0.79	−
PDP	A. Ansari	931	0.70	−
WPOI	Nasar Arattupuzha	878	0.66	−
NOTA	None of the above	627	0.47	−
Independent	Joseph Kuttikadan	266	0.20	
Independent	P. G. Sugunan	231	0.17	
Margin of victory		22,621	16.98	▲2.81
Turnout		1,33,294	78.90	▼0.73
CPI(M) hold		Swing	▼7.16	

=== 2011 ===
There were 1,46,890 registered voters in the constituency for the 2011 election.

2011 Kerala Legislative Assembly election: Ambalapuzha
Party	Candidate	Votes	%	±%
CPI(M)	G. Sudhakaran	63,728	54.48	▲1.21
INC	M. Liju	47,148	40.31	▼0.26
BJP	P. K. Vasudevan	2,668	2.28	▼0.48
SDPI	S. H. Alhadhi	1,852	1.58	−
BSP	Omanakuttan	672	0.57	▼0.28
SUCI(C)	K. R. Sasi	415	0.35	−
Independent	Sivakumar	347	0.30	
Independent	Nazeer Ahammed	136	0.12	
Margin of victory		16,580	14.17	▲1.48
Turnout		1,16,966	79.63	▲6.56
CPI(M) hold		Swing	▲1.21	

=== 2006 ===
There were 1,28,577 registered voters in the constituency for the 2006 Kerala Assembly election.

2006 Kerala Legislative Assembly election: Ambalappuzha
Party	Candidate	Votes	%	±%
CPI(M)	G. Sudhakaran	50,040	53.27	▲6.23
DIC	Adv. D. Sugathan	38,111	40.57	▼10.84
BJP	G. Baladevan	2,591	2.76	
Independent	K. R. Sasi	1,811	1.93	
BSP	K. J. Chandramohan	797	0.85	
AIADMK	Saleena Rehim	582	0.62	
Margin of victory		11,929	12.69	▲8.32
Turnout		93,953	73.07	▲0.85
CPI(M) gain from INC		Swing	▲6.23	

=== 2001 ===
There were 1,43,058 registered voters in the constituency for the 2001 Kerala Assembly election.

2001 Kerala Legislative Assembly election: Ambalappuzha
Party	Candidate	Votes	%	±%
INC	Adv. D. Sugathan	53,119	51.41	▲5.01
CPI(M)	C. K. Sadasivan	48,602	47.04	▼1.56
Independent	P. K. Sasi	890	0.86	
Independent	Vasudevan Nair R.	709	0.69	
Margin of victory		4,517	4.37	▲2.07
Turnout		1,03,325	72.22	▼3.08
INC gain from CPI(M)		Swing	▲5.01	

=== 1996 ===
There were 1,43,058 registered voters in the constituency for the 1996 Kerala Assembly election.

1996 Kerala Legislative Assembly election: Ambalappuzha
Party	Candidate	Votes	%	±%
CPI(M)	Susheela Gopalan	47,968	48.6	▼0.5
INC	Devadath G. Purakkad	45,710	46.4	▼1.1
BJP	K. D. Ramakrishnan	2,801	2.8	▲0.5
PDP	P. Sahadevan	1,242	1.3	
Independent	K. J. Sheela	432	0.4	
Independent	P. T. Chandrababu Kainakary	397	0.4	
Independent	Radhakrishnan N. N. Pillai	75	0.1	
Margin of victory		2,258	2.3	▲0.8
Turnout		1,00,204	75.3	▼4.5
CPI(M) hold		Swing	▼0.5	

=== 1991 ===
There were 1,27,784 registered voters in the constituency for the 1991 Kerala Assembly election.

1991 Kerala Legislative Assembly election: Ambalappuzha
Party	Candidate	Votes	%	±%
CPI(M)	C. K. Sadasivan	48,150	49.1	
INC	V. Dinakaran	46,617	47.5	
BJP	K. D. Ramakrishnan	2,259	2.3	
Jharkhand Party	Joseph Kuttikkarru	439	0.5	
Independent	S. Rajeevan	405	0.4	
Independent	P. T. Kuriakose	179	0.2	
Margin of victory		1,533	1.5	
Turnout		1,01,973	79.8	
CPI(M) gain from INC		Swing		

=== 1987 ===
There were 1,02,169 registered voters in the constituency for the 1987 Kerala Assembly election.

1987 Kerala Legislative Assembly election: Ambalappuzha
Party	Candidate	Votes	%	±%
INC	V. Dinakaran	41,938	47.62	
CPI(M)	G. Sudhakaran	41,814	47.48	
BJP	M. P. Unnikrishnan	2,620	2.98	
Independent	T. S. Joseph	720	0.82	
Independent	M. M. Sherief	335	0.38	
Independent	S. Rajeevan	212	0.24	
Independent	K. P. Nagendran	139	0.16	
Independent	T. E. Saifuddin	129	0.15	
Independent	Balakrishna Pillai Prabhakaran Pillai	92	0.10	
Independent	Shahul Hameed Muhammed	63	0.07	
Margin of victory		124	0.1	
Turnout		88,522	86.6	
UDF hold		Swing		

=== 1982 ===
There were 85,833 registered voters in the constituency for the 1982 Kerala Assembly election.

1982 Kerala Legislative Assembly election: Ambalappuzha
Party	Candidate	Votes	%	±%
Independent	V. Dinakaran	35,821	50.93	
CPI(M)	P. K. Chandranandan	33,937	48.25	
Independent	R. Balakrishna Pillai	582	0.83	
Margin of victory		1,884	2.7	
Turnout		70,818	82.5	
Independent gain from CPI(M)		Swing		

=== 1980 ===
There were 87,812 registered voters in the constituency for the 1980 Kerala Assembly election.

1980 Kerala Legislative Assembly election: Ambalappuzha
Party	Candidate	Votes	%	±%
CPI(M)	P. K. Chandranandan	36,009	52.27	
Independent	V. Dinakaran	32,884	47.73	
Margin of victory		3,125	4.5	
Turnout		70,818	82.5	
CPI(M) gain from RSP		Swing		

=== 1977 ===
There were 75,233 registered voters in the constituency for the 1977 Kerala Assembly election.

1977 Kerala Legislative Assembly election: Ambalappuzha
Party	Candidate	Votes	%	±%
RSP	K. K. Kumara Pillai	32,056	51.81	
CPI(M)	V. S. Achuthanandan	26,471	42.79	
Independent	Rajasimhan	2,288	3.70	
Independent	K. Balakrishna Kurup	458	0.74	
Independent	P. A. Majeed	269	0.43	
Independent	Joseph Poothara	223	0.36	
Independent	Rama Panicker Harihara Iyer	102	0.16	
Margin of victory		5,585	9.0	
Turnout		63,387	84.3	
RSP gain from CPI(M)		Swing		

== See also ==
- Ambalappuzha
- Alappuzha district
- List of constituencies of the Kerala Legislative Assembly
- 2016 Kerala Legislative Assembly election
