= Kalarcode =

- village
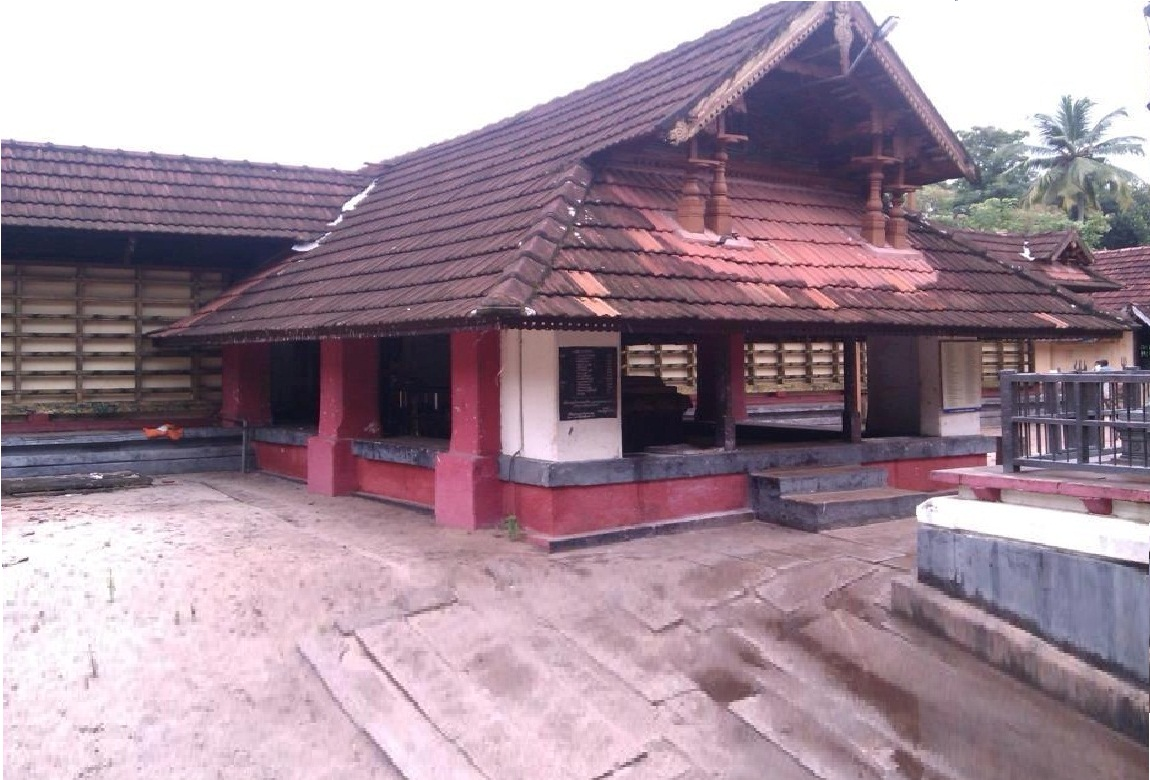
- Kalarcode Mahadeva Temple
- Interactive map of Kalarcode
- Coordinates: 9°28′0″N 76°20′30″E
- Country: India
- State: Kerala
- District: Alappuzha

Languages
  - Official: Malayalam, English
- Time zone: UTC+5:30 (IST)
- PIN: 688003
- Telephone code: 0477
- Vehicle registration: KL-
- Coastline: 0 kilometres (0 mi)
- Nearest city: Alappuzha
- Lok Sabha constituency: Alappuzha
- Climate: Tropical monsoon (Köppen)
- Avg. summer temperature: 35 °C (95 °F)
- Avg. winter temperature: 20 °C (68 °F)

Kalarcode or Kalarkode is an Indian village in Alappuzha district, 4 kilometres (2.5 mi) from the town of Alappuzha. The village name derives from Kalyakroda Vilasam.

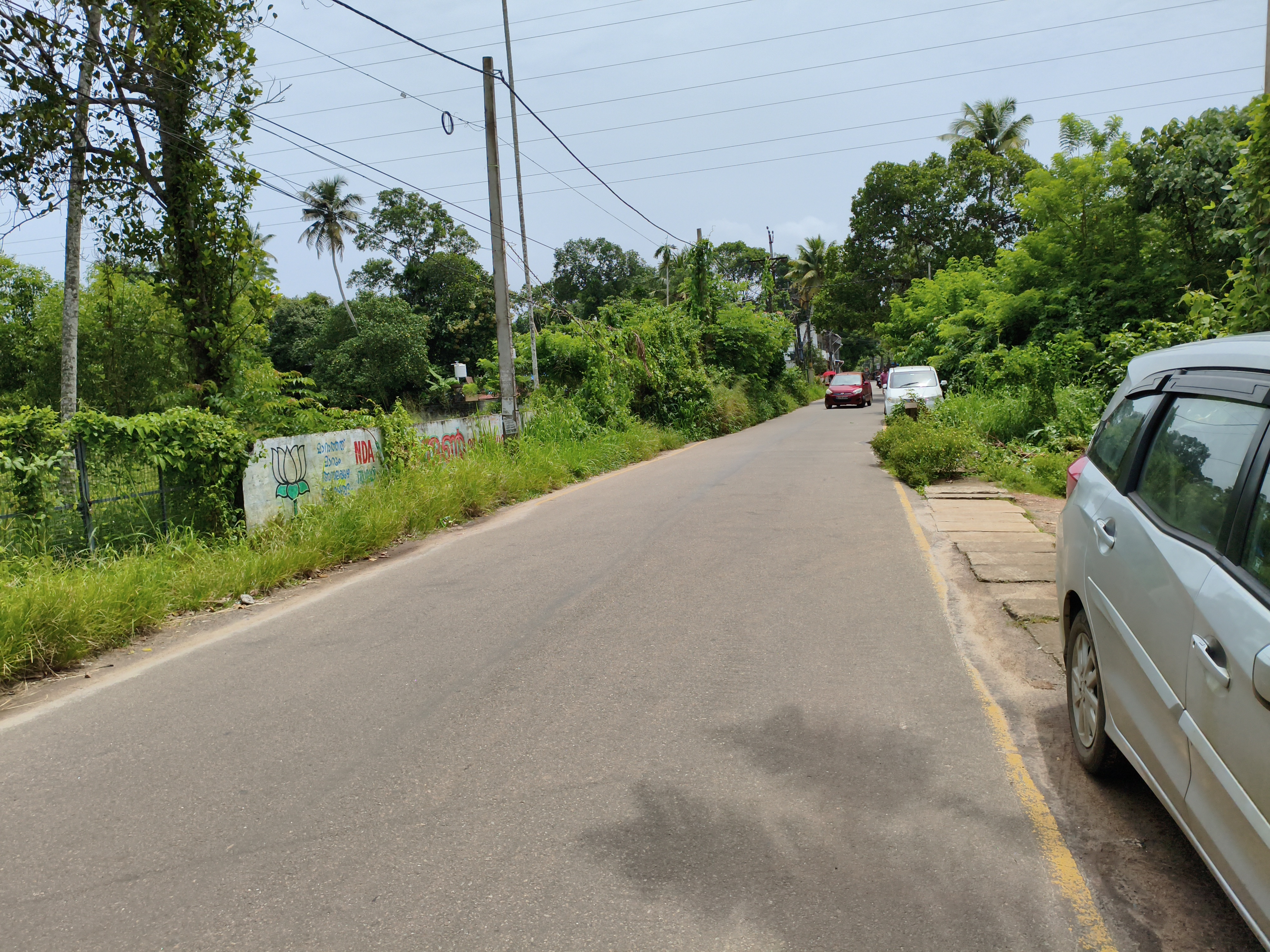
IMS Rd in Kalarcode, Alappuzha, bordering Punnapra

== Demographics ==
As of the 2001 Census of India, Kalarkode had a population of - with - males and - females.

== Education ==
Sanatana Dharma College is situated here, as are the Alappuzha centre of the Institute of Management in Kerala and the Kerala University Study centre.

== Transportation ==
Kalarkode have connections with Alappuzha, Eranakulam, Changanassery and other parts of Kerala through a well-connected network of roads & rail. The nearest railway station is Alappuzha Railway Station, 3.1 kilometres (1.9 mi) away. The nearest airport is Cochin International Airport, 92.3 kilometres (57.4 mi) away. The Alappuzha - Changanassery state highway (AC Road) starts at Kalarkode. The construction of Alappuzha Bypass starting from Kalarkode at the south end to set apart National Highway 66 (Old NH 47) crisscrossing through the bustling Alappuzha city heart is underway construction at a rapid pace.

== Nearby places ==
- Ambalapuzha
- Alappuzha
- Champakulam
- Cherthala
- Haripad
- Sanathanapuram

== Administration ==
The village is part of Ambalapuzha state assembly constituency for state elections. That in turn is part of the Alappuzha Lok Sabha constituency for national elections.

== Religion ==
The Major Mahadeva temple is an important place of worship in this area.
