= Paravur =

Paravur may refer to:

- Paravur, Kollam, a municipality in Kerala, India
  - Paravur Lake, a lake in Paravur, Kollam, Kerala, India
  - Paravur railway station, a railway station in Kollam district, Kerala, India
- North Paravur, a municipality in Ernakulam district, Kerala, India
  - Paravur Taluk, a taluk in Ernakulam district, Kerala, India
- South Paravur, a village in Ernakulam district, Kerala, India
- Paravur, Alappuzha, a village in Alappuzha district, Kerala, India
