= College of Engineering and Management, Punnapra =

CAPE College Of Engineering Alappuzha (CCEA)
- കേപ്പ് കോളേജ് ഓഫ് എഞ്ചിനീയറിംഗ് ആലപ്പുഴ
- Type: Public, Government Educational Institution
- Established: 2008
- Affiliations: AICTE, A P J Abdul Kalam Technological University
- Chairman: Chief Minister of Kerala
- Principal: Roobin V.Varghese
- Students: 1500+
- Location: Punnapra, Alappuzha, Kerala, India; 9°46′15″N 76°33′18″E
- Website: www.cempunnapra.org, www.capekerala.org

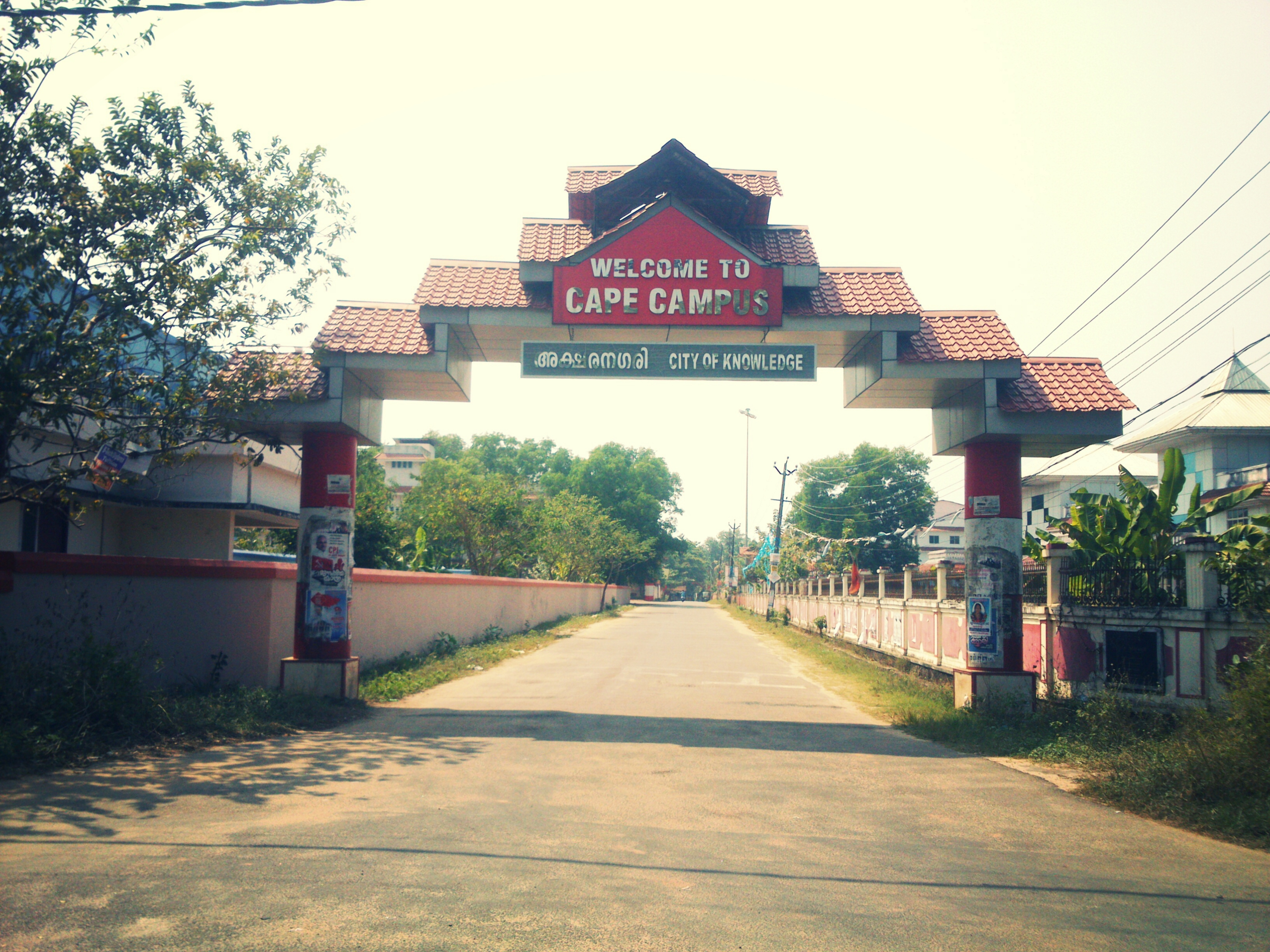
Entrance to Campus

The CAPE College of Engineering Alappuzha is an educational institution established in 2008 under the Co-operative Academy of Professional Education. The College is affiliated to Kerala University(till 2015) and A.P.J Abdul Kalam Technical University ( KTU) (from 2015) and is approved by All India Council for Technical Education (AICTE).

The Institution is currently holding the place of one of the largest engineering workshop in kerala. Fully controlled and funded by Govt of Kerala.

== Courses ==
B.Tech Courses (UG) - Duration - 4 Years

- Civil Engineering - 4 Year Course - 60 seats
- Computer Science and Engineering - 4 Year Course - 120 seats
- Computer Science and Business Systems - 4 Year Course - 60 seats
- Electronics and Communication Engineering - 4 Year Course - 60 seats
- Electrical and Electronics Engineering - 4 Year Course - 30 seats
- Electrical and Computer Engineering - 4 Year Course - 60 seats
- Information Technology - 4 Year Course - 60 seats
- Master of Computer Applications - 2 Year Course - 60 seats

M.Tech Courses (PG) - Duration - 2 Years

- Computer Science & Engineering - 2 Year Course - 18 seats

== Admission ==
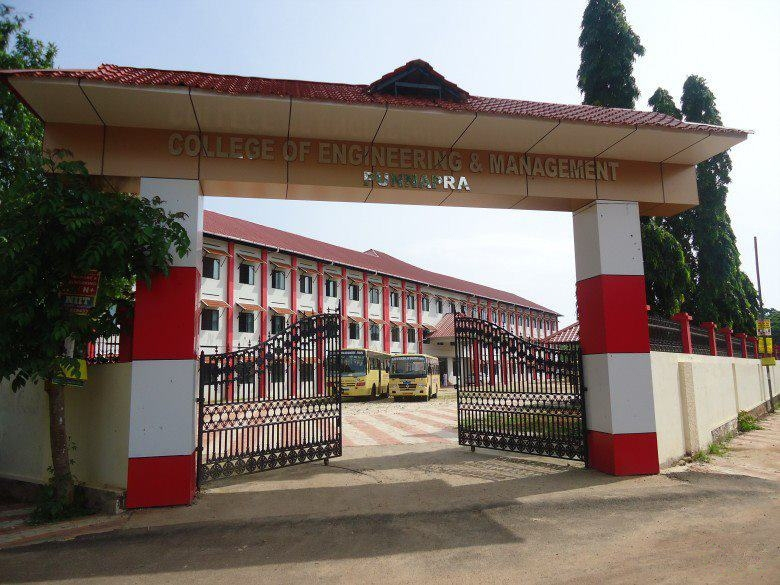
Entrance to CAPE Campus

Admission of students are carried out by the basis of the ranks obtained in the state-level Common Entrance Exam, conducted by the Commissioner of Entrance Examination(CEE).

== Location ==
The College is situated inside CAPE Campus or City Of Knowledge which is an education healthcare campus consist of many other institutions like Institute of Management & Technology(IMT), Kerala Institute of Making the Best(KIMB), Sagara Hospital. All these institutions situated in Punnapra North near Alappuzha. It is about 4 km from Alappuzha town which is commonly known as Venice of The East.

== Facilities ==
- Canteen
- 1 Boys Hostel
- 1 Girls Hostel
- Central Park
- State Bank Of India (SBI) ATM
- Post Office - (Vadakkal Alappuzha - 688003)
- Career Guidance and Placement Unit
- Central Library
- Indoor Badminton Court
- Auditorium
- Stationery shop
- Gymnasium (proposed)
- Student's Vehicle Parking Shed

== About ==
All the events are under the care of govt of Kerala. The admissions to the free/merit seats and management seats are through the Central Allotment Process conducted by the Controller of Entrance Examinations, government of Kerala. The proportion of seats are as follows : free/merit seats 50%, management seats 35% (as aforementioned allotment to both these categories are through the Central Allotment Process ), the remaining 15% seats come under the NRI quota.

=== Placement ===
The placement cell provides the opportunity for the final year students to attend campus interviews with organizations and arranges in-industry training for students. Main recruiters include Tata Consultancy Services, IBS Software Services, Amazon, Logidots, UST Global, Mindtree etc.

== Activities ==
=== Atharva-'19 ===
National Technical event conducted in 2019. Including varieties of workshop, games, DJ.

=== Atharva-'20 ===
National Technical event conducted in 2020.

=== Dextra ===
Cultural Festival of CEMP

== See also ==
- List of Engineering Colleges in Kerala
- Co-operative Academy of Professional Education
- KEAM
- All India Council for Technical Education

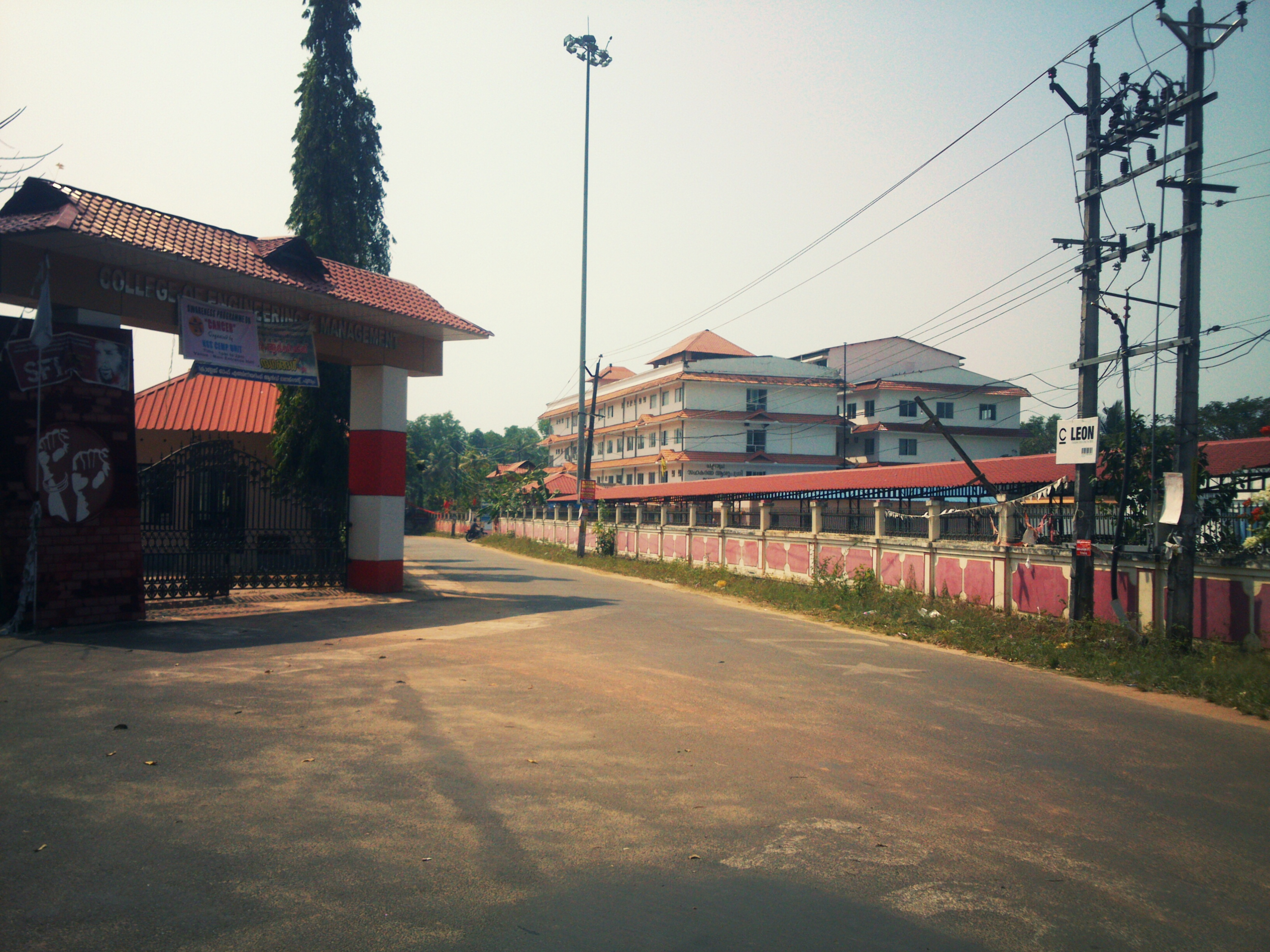
Campus
