= List of colleges affiliated to the Cochin University of Science and Technology =

Cochin University of Science and Technology (CUSAT) is a government owned autonomous university in Kochi (Cochin), Kerala, India. CUSAT is academically structured into 9 faculties: engineering, environmental studies, humanities, law, marine sciences, medical sciences and technology, science, social sciences and technology. It has 27 departments offering graduate and post graduate programmes as well as research in different disciplines like engineering, science, technology, humanities, law and management. Various centres for specialised areas is established by the university aiming multi-disciplinary interaction. Apart from these there are many government and non-government institutions affiliated with CUSAT.

== Recognised institutions ==
No.	Name	District	Code	Established	Management	Source
1	CUCE Kuttanad	Alappuzha	-	1999	CUSAT	
2	Government Medical College, Ernakulam	Ernakulam	CMC	1999	CAPE (Co-operative Academy of Professional Education)	
3	CIFNET	Ernakulam	-	1963	Government of India	
4	Conspi Academy of Management Studies, Plankalamukku	Thiruvananthapuram	-	2004	Private Self-financing	
5	Southern Naval Command Headquarters	Ernakulam	-	2004	Indian Navy	
6	ER & DCI Institute of Technology	Thiruvananthapuram	-	2001	Department of Information Technology	
7	IIITM	Thiruvananthapuram	-	2000	Government of Kerala	
8	Bhavan's Royal Institute of Management	Ernakulam	-	2002	Bharathiya Vidya Bhavan	
9	College of Engineering Thalassery	Kannur	-	2020	CAPE (Co-operative Academy of Professional Education)	

== Research centres ==
No.	Name	District	Established	Management	Source
1	CIFT	Ernakulam	1957	ICAR	
2	NCESS	Thiruvananthapuram	1978	Kerala State Council for Science, Technology and Environment	
4	CMFRI	Ernakulam	1947	Indian Council of Agricultural Research	
5	MPEDA	Ernakulam	1972	Department of Commerce, Government of India	
6	NPOL	Ernakulam	1958	Defence Research and Development Organisation	
7	NIO	Ernakulam	1960	CSIR	
8	RRII)	Kottayam	1955	Rubber Board	
9	KSCSTE KFRI	Thrissur	1975	Kerala State Council for Science, Technology and Environment	
10	Vikram Sarabhai Space Centre(VSSC)	Thiruvananthapuram	1963	Indian Space Research Organisation	
11	National Institute for Interdisciplinary Science and Technology (NIIST)	Thiruvananthapuram	1975	CSIR	
12	Kerala Institute of Local Administration (KILA)	Thrissur	1990	Government of Kerala	
13	Cochin Base of Fishery survey of India	Ernakulam	1957	Fishery survey of India	
14	Central Coir Research Institute	Alappuzha	1953	Coir Board of India	
15	Integrated Fisheries Project	Ernakulam	1972	Government of India	

== See also ==
- Cochin University of Science and Technology
