= Alappuzha Bypass =

NH bypass in Kerala

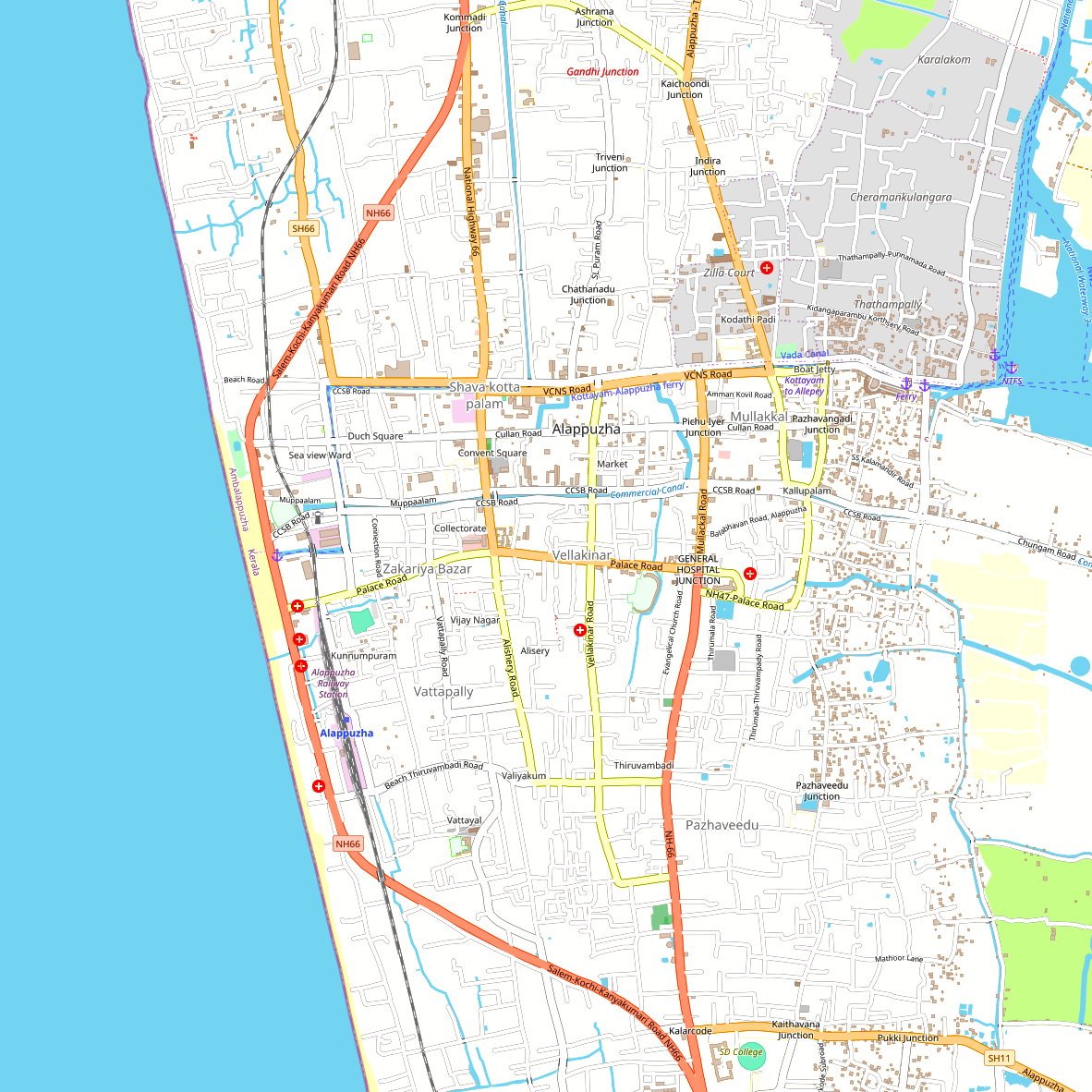

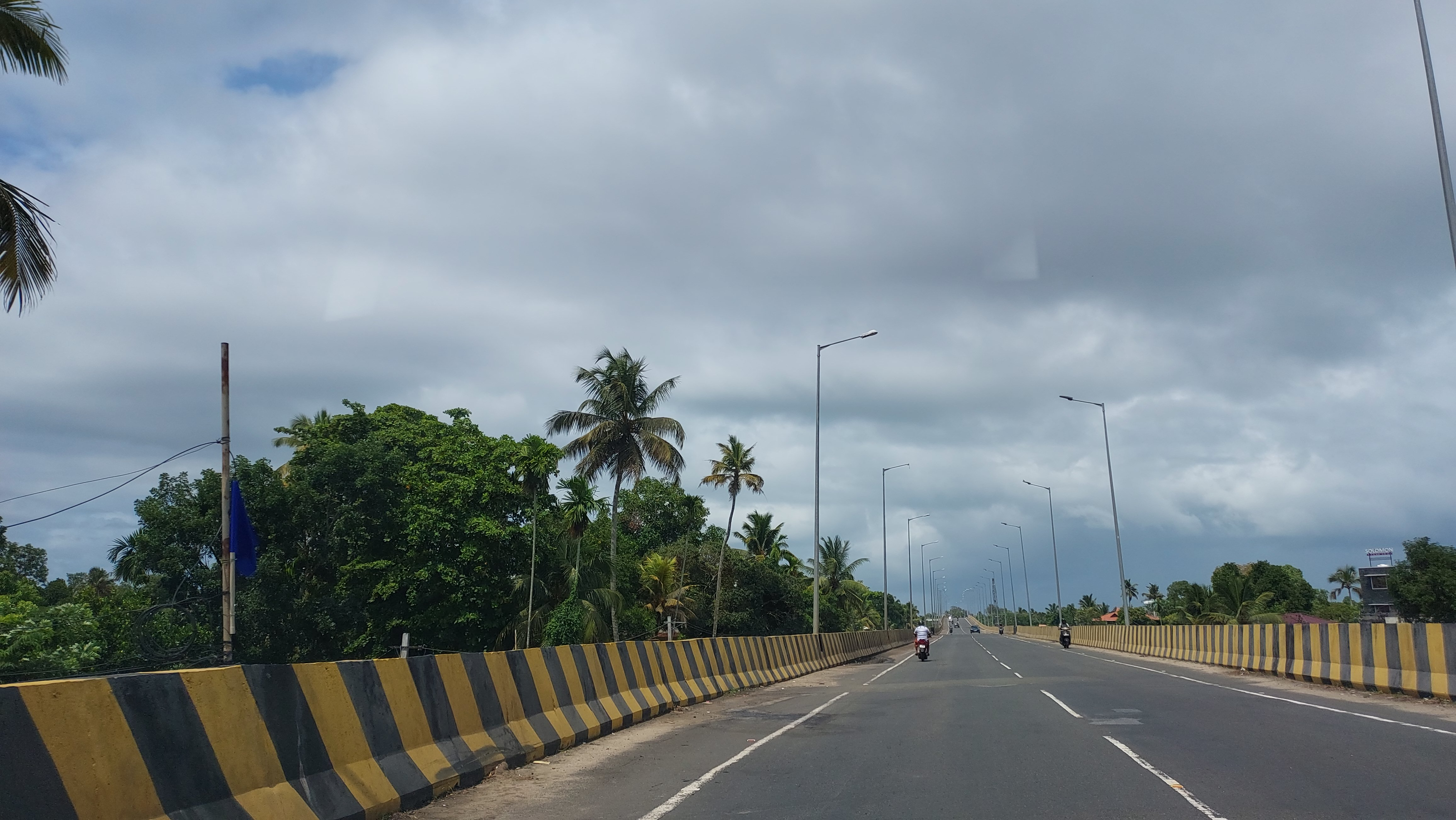
- Street view of Alappuzha bypass.

Route information
- Maintained by NHAI
- Length: 6.8 km (4.2 mi)
- Existed: 28 January 2021–present

Major junctions
- South end: NH-66 in Kalarcode
- North end: NH-66 in Kommady

Location
- Country: India
- Major cities: Alappuzha

Highway system
- Roads in India; Expressways; National; State; Asian

Alappuzha Bypass is a part of NH 66 that bypasses the CBD of Alappuzha city in Kerala, India. The 6.8 km long, two lane bypass is the first and longest elevated beach highway in the country, starting at Kalarcode in the south and ending at Kommady in the north. It runs along the beachside of Alappuzha City. It is a joint venture (50:50) between the central and state governments. The contractor for the project was RDS-CVCC, which is a joint venture that is also responsible for Kollam Bypass project, which was inaugurated in 2019 by Prime Minister Shri Narendra Modi. CVCC worked on the Kollam Bypass while RDS construction company completed the Alappuzha bypass. This was the first bypass project in the state of Kerala but the construction was delayed by 40 years.

The Central government contributed Rs 185 crores and the State government Rs 250 crores for the project. The bypass is under the Thuravoor Thekku - Paravur stretch of the national highway widening project. As a part of six laning NH 66, a two lane elevated bridge parallel to the existing elevated bridge is under construction.

== History ==
The necessity for a bypass at Alappuzha dates back to the 1970s. NH 66 is one of the longest national highways in India stretching from Panvel to Kanyakumari and criss-crossing through the Alappuzha city centre. The highway gets narrower as it enters the urban area, and together with the criss-crossing, a lot of traffic is created. Since then it had been a long time plea to reroute the national highway around the downtown.

The land for the Alappuzha bypass was acquired by the revenue department in 1980, and the width of the bypass was decided to be 45 meters wide. In 2008, the project became a part of the National Highways Authority of India's (NHAI) project to convert NH 66 into a 4 lane road from Cherthala to Oachira. In 2010, it was announced that the bypass would be its own special project. On April 10, 2015, Nitin Gadkari inaugurated the construction on the bypass, and work on it began.

=== Timeline ===
Year	Events
1980	Early proposals for constructing NH Bypass road at Alappuzha.
1980	The revenue department had acquired land for the bypass.
2008	Alappuzha bypass was included as a part of the project of National Highways Authority of India (NHAI).
2010	Centre had announced that the bypass project would be completed as a special project.
2015	Union transport and highways minister Nitin Gadkari inaugurated the long-pending construction works of the Alappuzha bypass from Kommadi to Kalarkode.
2017	Delay in fund allocation and public protest put off the proposed completion by September 2017.
2018	Indian Railways declined approval for constructing the two ROBs at Malikamukku and Kuthirapanthy.
2020	Indian Railways granted permission to place girders at Malikamukku in January 2020.
2020	Following to Malikamukku, Indian Railways nods to place girders at Kuthirapanthy in June 2020.
2021	Alappuzha Bypass inaugurated on 28 January by Nitin Gadkari (Central Road Transport Minister), and Pinarayi Vijayan (Chief Minister of Kerala).

== Project specifications ==
Project Specifications
Project Title	Alappuzha Bypass
Type	Elevated Beach Highway
Total Distance	6.8 kilometres (4.2 mi)
Construction Mode	Engineering Procurement Construction (EPC)
Contractor	Cherian Varkey Construction Company-RDS (JV), Kochi
South End	Kalarcode
North End	Kommady
ROBs	2 (Malikamukku & Kuthirapanthy)
Underpass	—N/a
Major Bridges	—N/a
No of Pilings	—N/a
Piers	—N/a
Culverts	—N/a
Project Cost	₹348.43 crore (US$37 million)

== Gallery ==
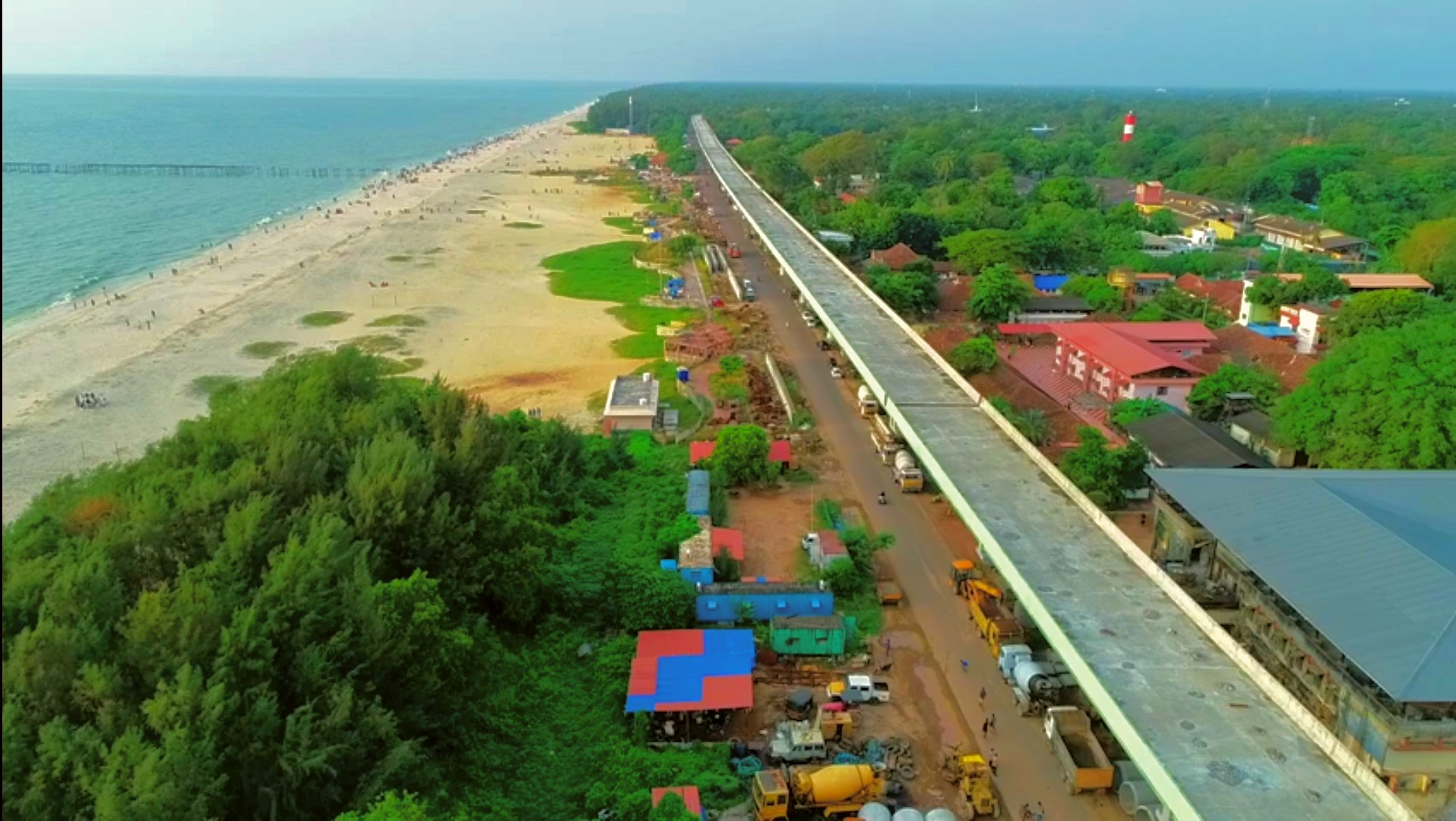
Aerial View

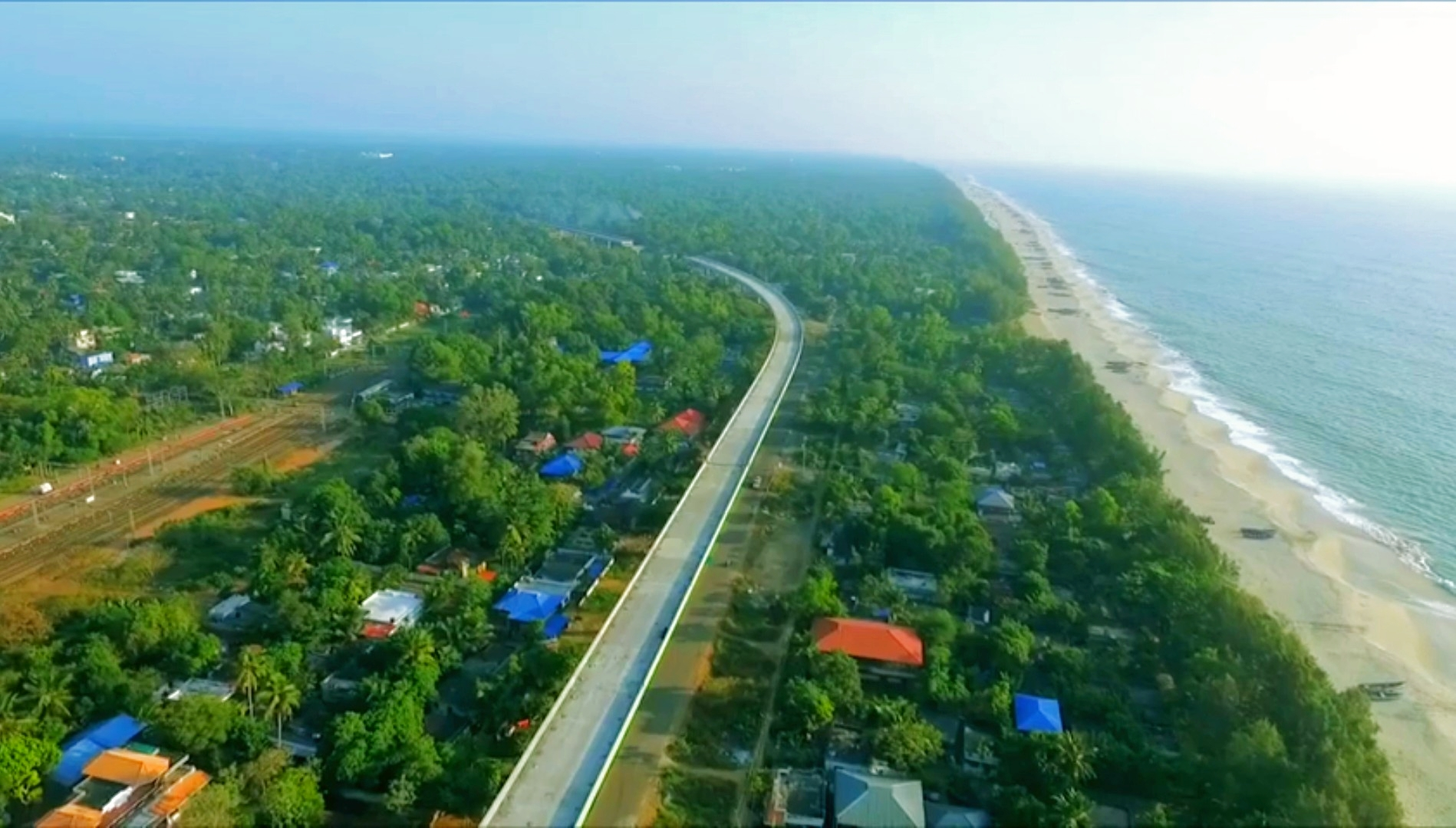
Aerial View

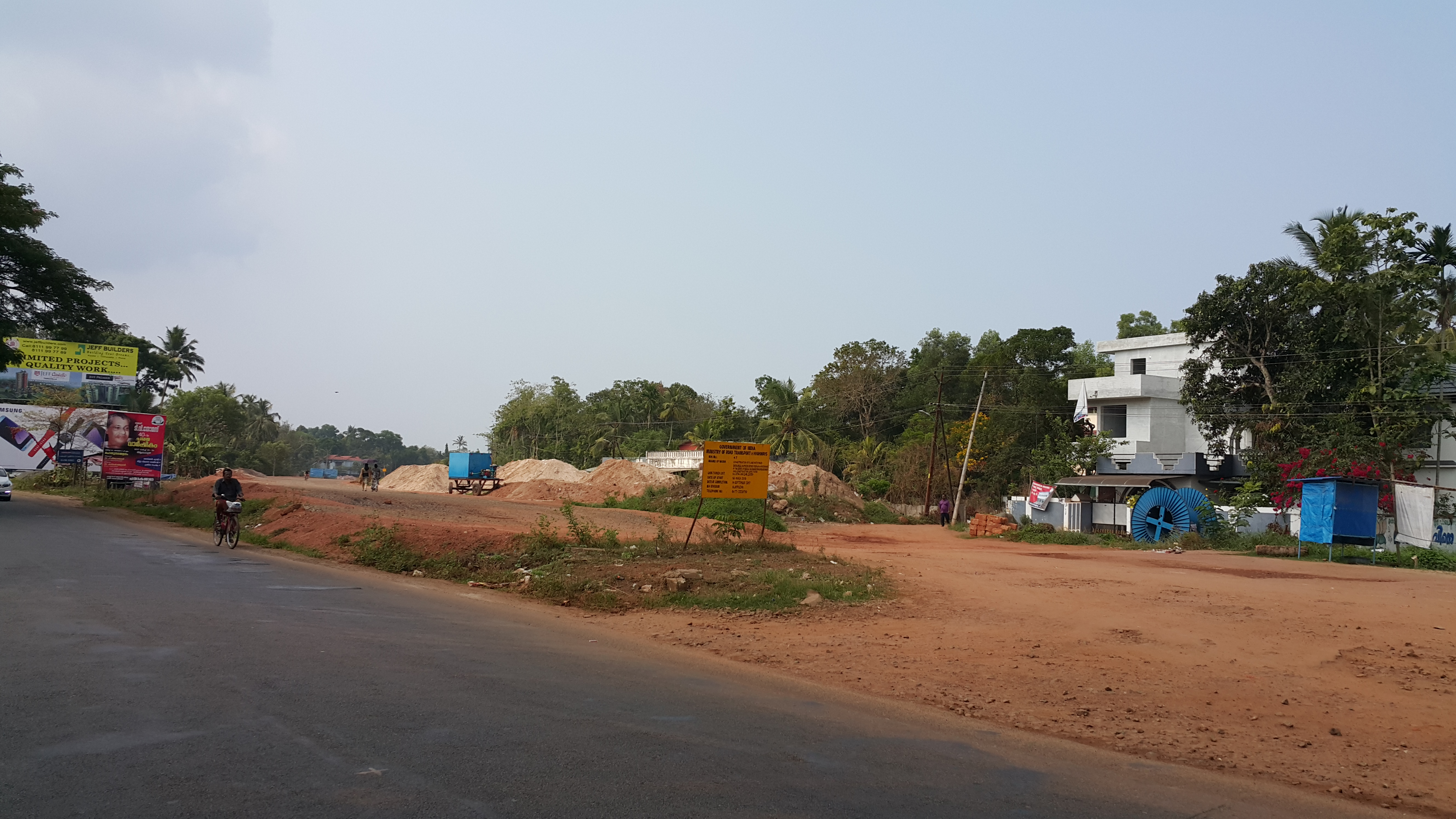

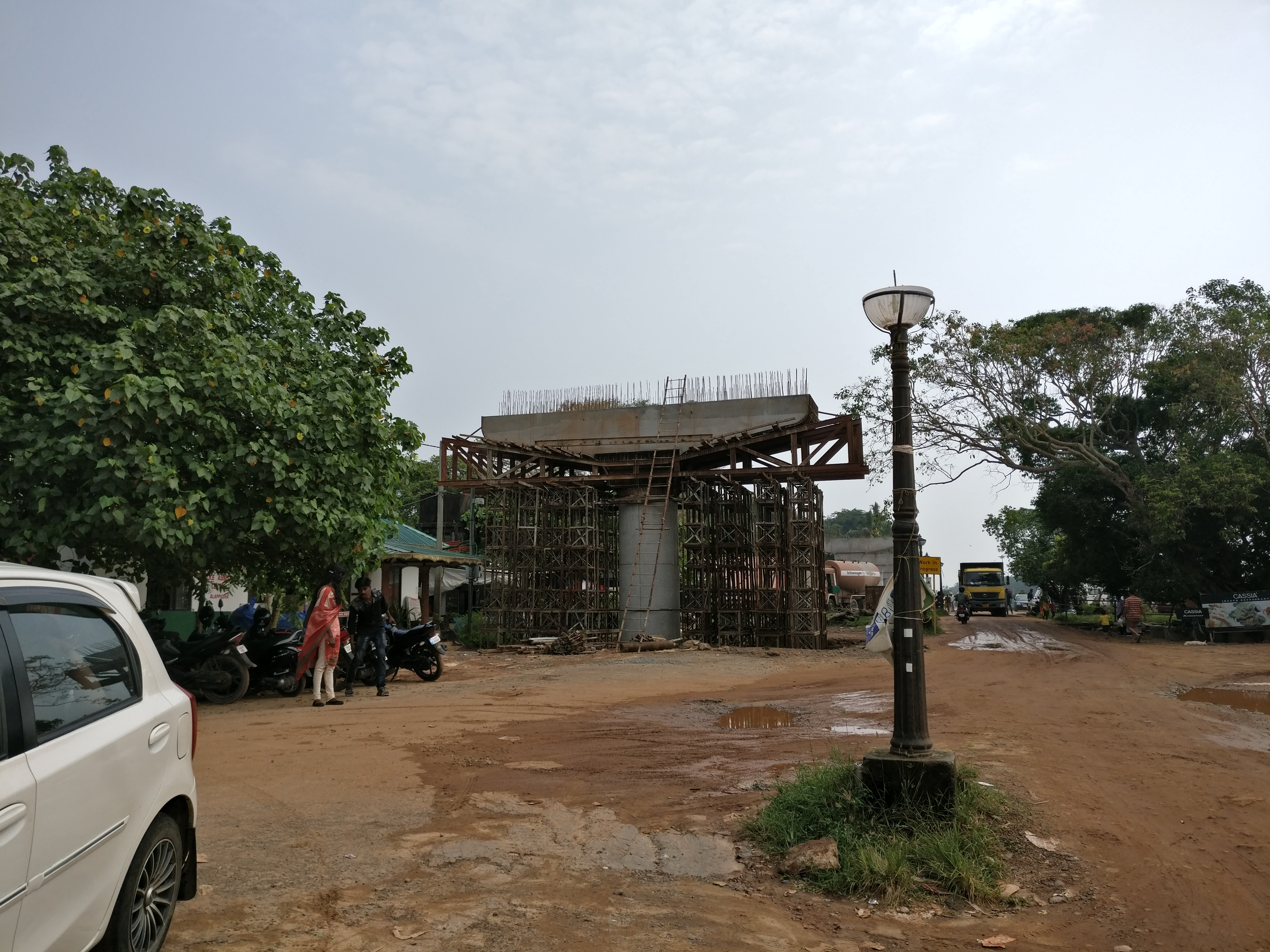

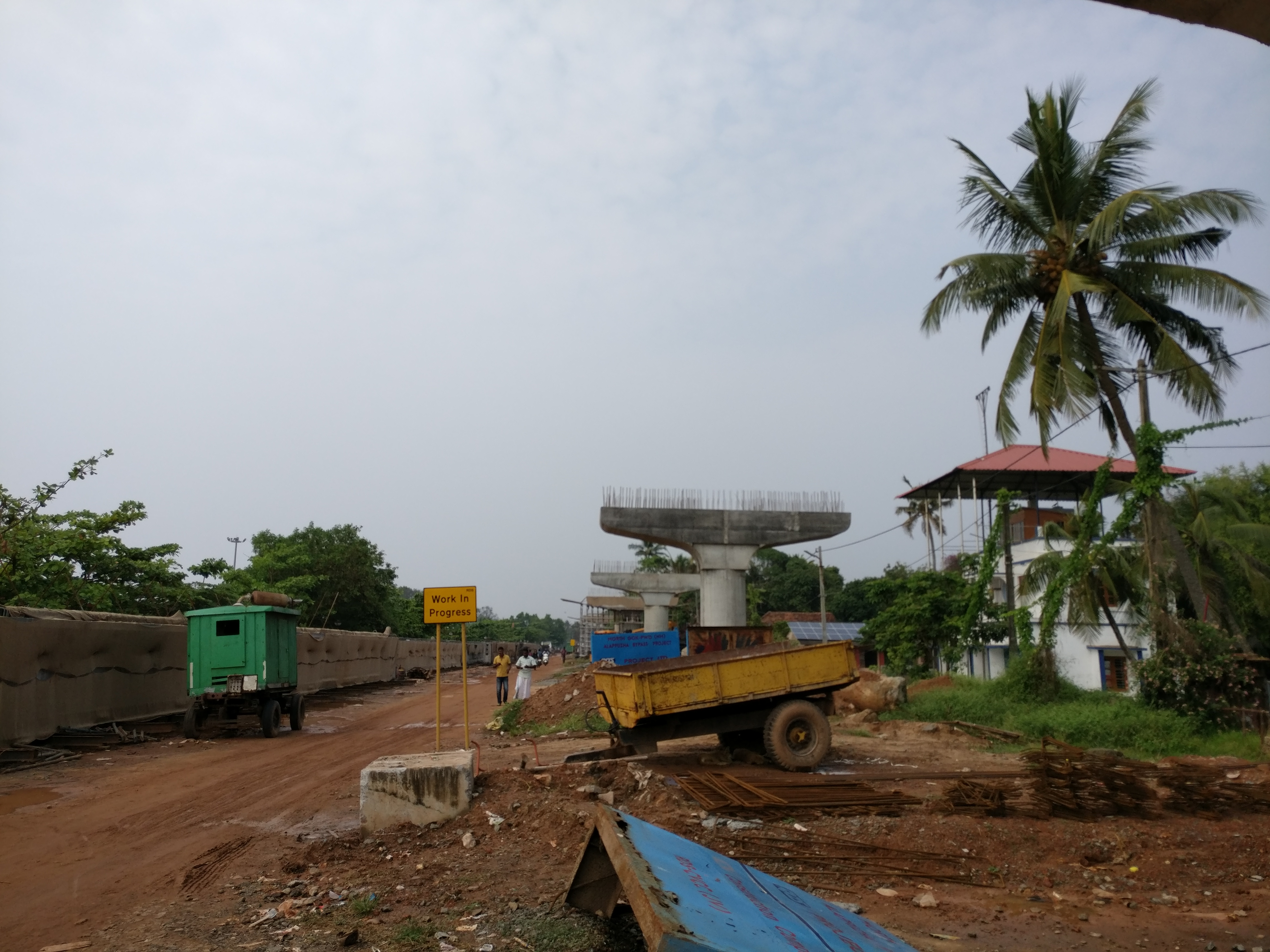

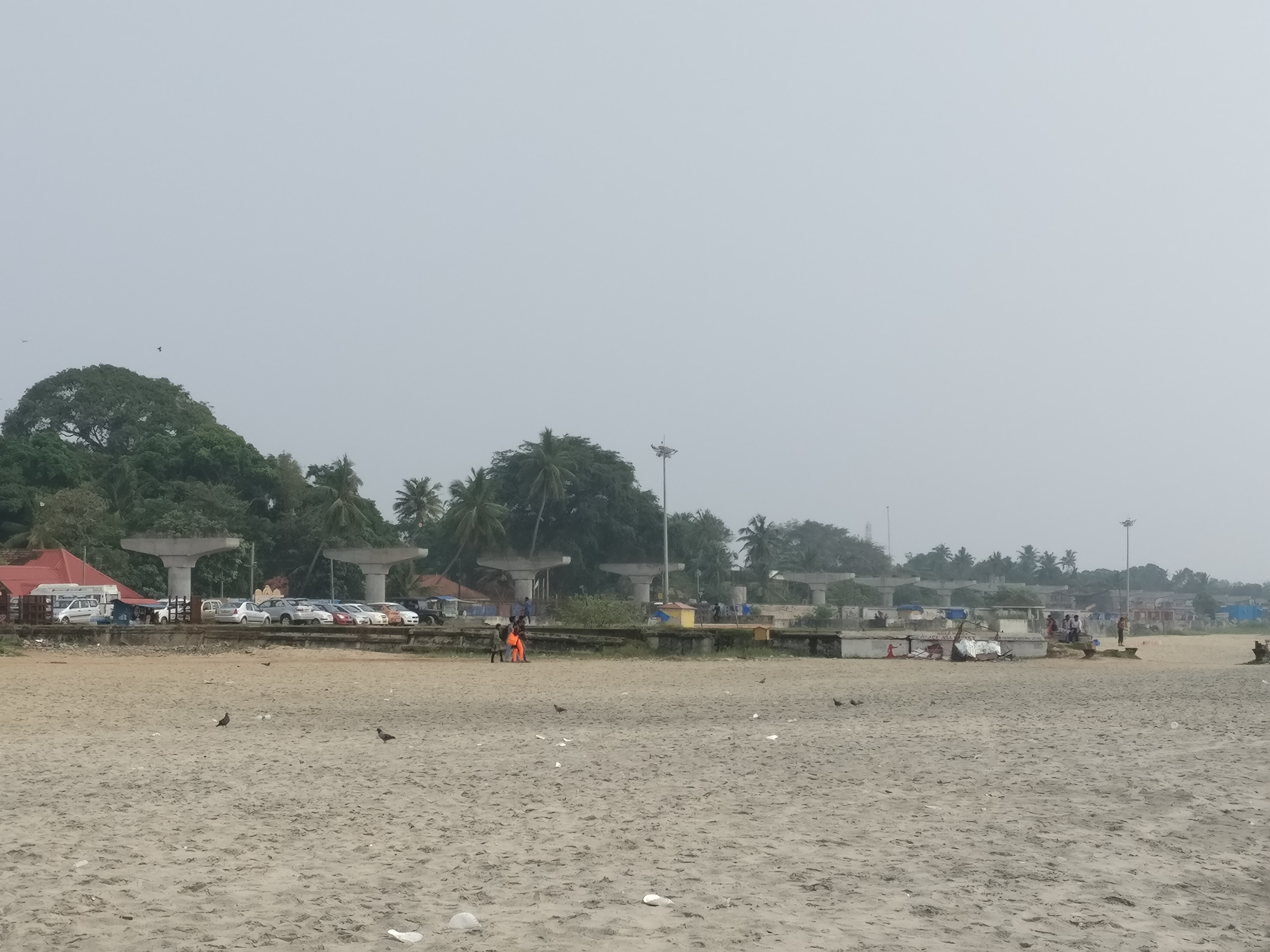

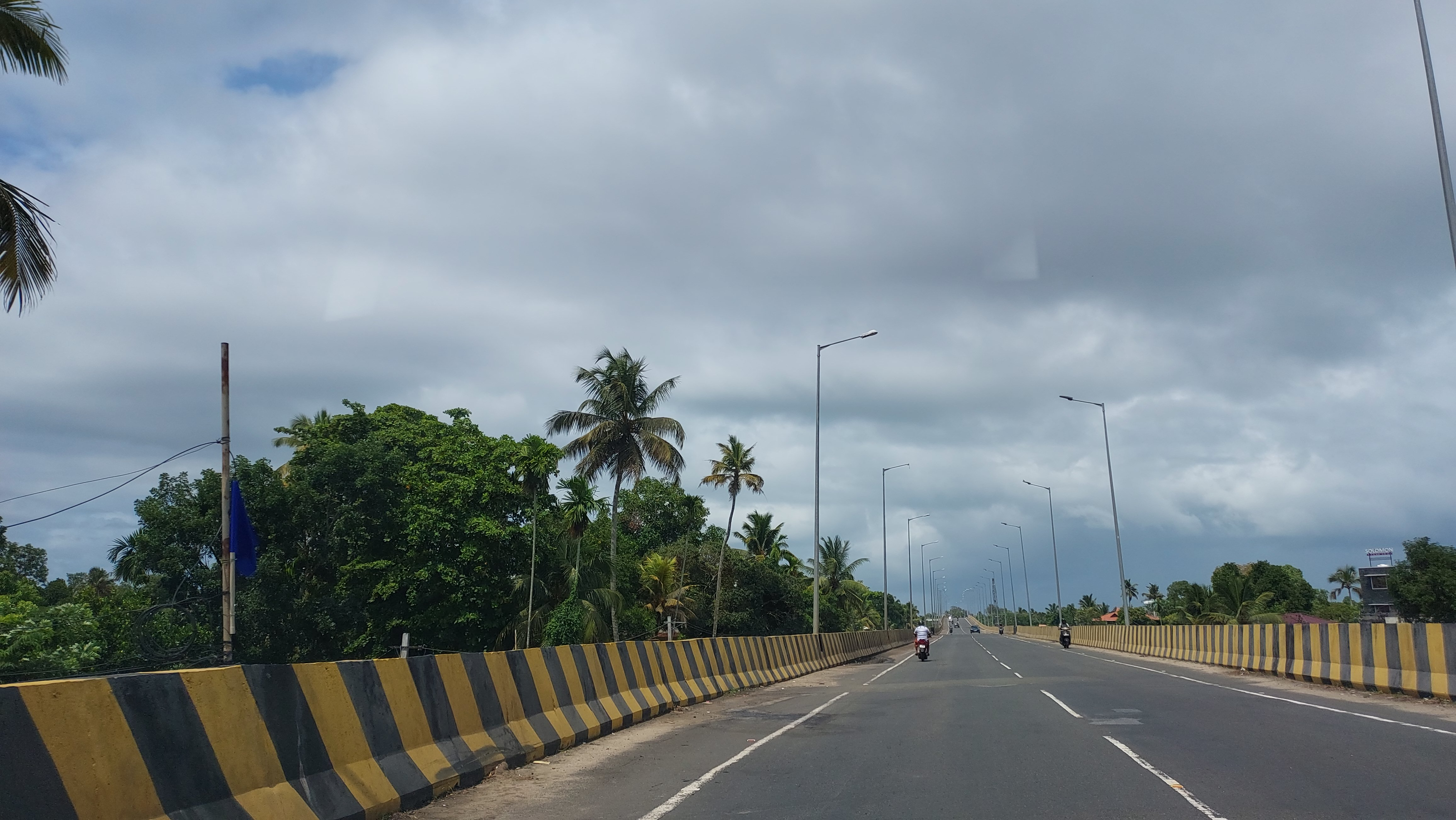
Alappuzha Bypass road (June 2023)

== See also ==
- Alappuzha
- Alappuzha District
- List of national highways in India by state
- List of state highways in Kerala
- National highways in India
- Roads in India
- Roads in Kerala
