= H. Salam =

Indian politician

Member of the Kerala Legislative Assembly
- In office 24 May 2021 – 23 May 2026
- Preceded by: G. Sudhakaran
- Succeeded by: G. Sudhakaran
- Constituency: Ambalappuzha

Personal details
- Born: Kerala, India
- Party: CPI-M,

H. Salam is an Indian politician, who is a member of the CPI-M. He served as a member of the Kerala Legislative Assembly representing Ambalappuzha constituency.
