= Co-operative Academy of Professional Education =

Educational institution in India

The Co-operative Academy of Professional Education (CAPE) of Kerala, India, is an educational institution in professional fields to provide facilities for education and training. CAPE is promoted by the Co-operation Department of the Government of Kerala and is an autonomous society under the Government of Kerala. The society is registered under the Travancore-Cochin Literary, Scientific and Charitable Societies Act, 1955 on the basis of the Memorandum of Association and the rules as approved by the Government of Kerala. The Chief Minister of Kerala, Shri. Pinarayi Vijayan is the ex-officio chairman of the society. The Minister for Co-operation, Tourism, Devaswoms, Shri. V. N. Vasavan is the ex-officio vice-chairman of the society and the chairman of its board of governors.

== Institutions under CAPE ==
Under CAPE there are nine engineering colleges, one management institute and one finishing school and a hospital at Punnapra.

Name	District	Code	Established	Source
College of Engineering Aranmula	Pathanamthitta	AEC	2014	
College of Engineering Kidangoor	Kottayam	KGR	2000	
College of Engineering Perumon	Kollam	PRN	2000	
College of Engineering Trikaripur	Kasaragod	TKR	2000	
College of Engineering Vatakara	Kozhikode	VDA	1999	
College of Engineering Thalassery	Kannur	TLY	2000	
College of Engineering Pathanapuram	Kollam	PEC	2011	
College of Engineering and Management, Punnapra	Alappuzha	PRP	2008	
College of Engineering Muttathara	Thiruvananthapuram	CEM	2016	
Institute of Management and Technology, Punnapra|Institute of Management and Technology, Punnapra	Alappuzha	IMT	2009	
Kerala Institute of Making the Best, Punnapra|Kerala Institute of Making the Best, Punnapra	Alappuzha	KIMB	-	
Sagara Hospital, Punnapra|Sagara Hospital Punnapra	Alappuzha	-	2010	
