= G. Sudhakaran =

Indian politician (born 1946)

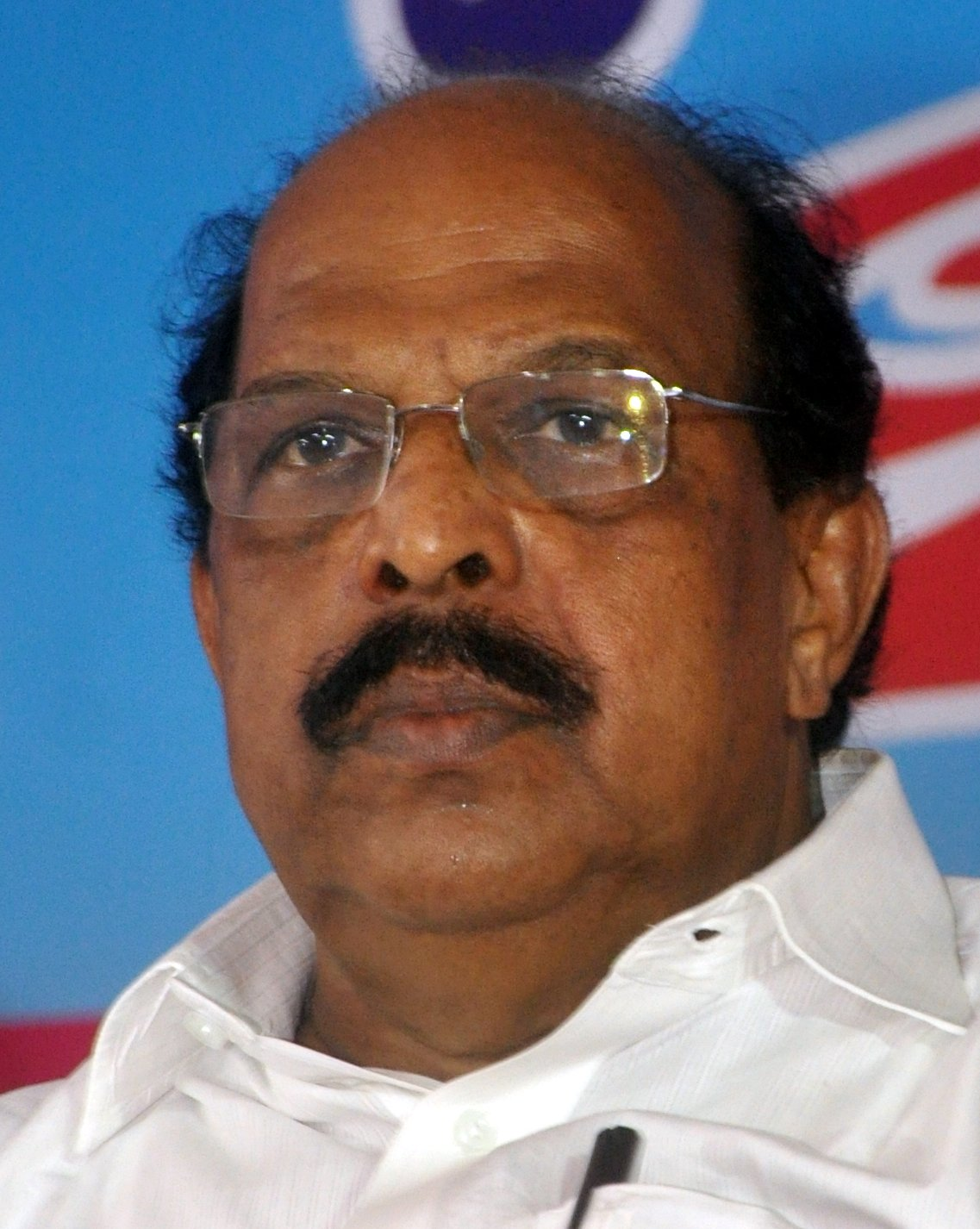

Pro-tem Speaker of the Kerala Legislative Assembly
- In office 20 May 2026 – 22 May 2026
- Preceded by: A. N. Shamseer (Speaker)
- Succeeded by: Thiruvanchoor Radhakrishnan (Speaker)

Minister for Public Works and Registration, Government of Kerala
- In office 25 May 2016 – 3 May 2021
- Chief Minister: Pinarayi Vijayan
- Preceded by: V. K. Ebrahimkunju (Public Works); Anoop Jacob (Registration)
- Succeeded by: P. A. Mohammed Riyas (Public Works); Kadannappalli Ramachandran (Registration)

Member of the Kerala Legislative Assembly
- Incumbent
- Assumed office 4 May 2026
- Preceded by: H. Salam
- Constituency: Ambalappuzha
- In office 2006 – 2016
- Preceded by: D. Sugathan
- Succeeded by: H. Salam
- Constituency: Ambalappuzha
- In office 1996–2001
- Preceded by: Thachedy Prabhakaran
- Succeeded by: M. M. Hassan
- Constituency: Kayamkulam

Minister for Co-operation, Coir and Electricity, Government of Kerala
- In office 2006 – 2011
- Chief Minister: V. S. Achuthanandan
- Preceded by: M. V. Raghavan (Co-operation); Aryadan Muhammed (Electricity)
- Succeeded by: C. N. Balakrishnan (Co-operation); Adoor Prakash (Coir); Aryadan Muhammed (Electricity)

Personal details
- Born: 1 November 1946 (age 80) Mavelikkara, Alappuzha, Travancore–Cochin (present day Kerala), India
- Party: Independent (2026–present); Communist Party of India (Marxist) (1960s - 2026)
- Parents: P. Gopala Kurup; L. Pankajakshi Amma
- Education: Master of Arts; Bachelor of Laws

G. Sudhakaran (born 1 November 1946) is an Indian politician and author. He is a former minister of Government of Kerala and member of the Communist Party of India (Marxist). Sudhakaran is an independent politician since 2026 and represents the Ambalappuzha constituency since 2026 and previously from 2006 to 2021.

== Career ==
=== Politician ===
He was Member, CPI(M), Alappuzha District Committee and State Committee. He was elected to Kerala Legislative Assembly in 1996 and 2006.

=== Author ===
He published books including:

- Aaranu née Obama (Collection of Poems).
- Unni Makane Manohara (Collection of Poems).
- Sannithanathile Kazhuthakal (Collection of Poems).
- Kanal Vazhiyil Kari Puralathe (Collection of Selected Niyamasabha Speeches).
