= South Paravur =

Village in Kerala

- Village
- Interactive map of South Paravur
- Country: India
- State: Kerala
- District: Ernakulam

Languages
  - Official: Malayalam, English
- Time zone: UTC+5:30 (IST)
- Nearest city: Kochi
- Climate: tropical (Köppen)

South Paravur is a small village near Udayamperoor, India. It is part of Kanayannur taluk of Ernakulam district. Its name distinguishes it from the town with the same name in the northern end of Ernakulam. Vembanad Lake, and the house of prominent political leader and former Chief Minister of Kerala V.S. Achuthanandan are nearby.

== See also ==
- Paravur, Kollam place with same near Kollam
- Paravur, Alappuzha place with same near Alappuzha
- North Paravur, a town in Ernakulam with same name
