= Ambalapuzha North =

Human settlement in India

Ambalapuzha North is a panchayat and part of Ambalapuzha. It is in Alappuzha district, Kerala, India.
