= Punnapra =

- Town
- Location in Kerala, India Punnapra (India)
- Coordinates: 9°26′0″N 76°20′0″E
- Country: India
- State: Kerala
- District: Alappuzha

Languages
  - Official: Malayalam, English
- Time zone: UTC+5:30 (IST)
- PIN: 688004
- Vehicle registration: KL-04
- Nearest city: Alappuzha
- Nearest Hospitals: Vandanam Medical Hospital; Sagara Hospital

Punnapra (Malayalam: [punːɐprɐ]) is a village in Alappuzha district of Kerala, India. It is a coastal area of the Arabian Sea and lies west to Kuttanad, popularly known as The rice bowl of Kerala. Punnapra is located on NH 66 of about 8 km (5.0 mi) south of district headquarters Alappuzha.

== Local Governance ==
Punnapra is divided into 2 panchayats:

- Punnapra North
- Punnapra South

== History ==
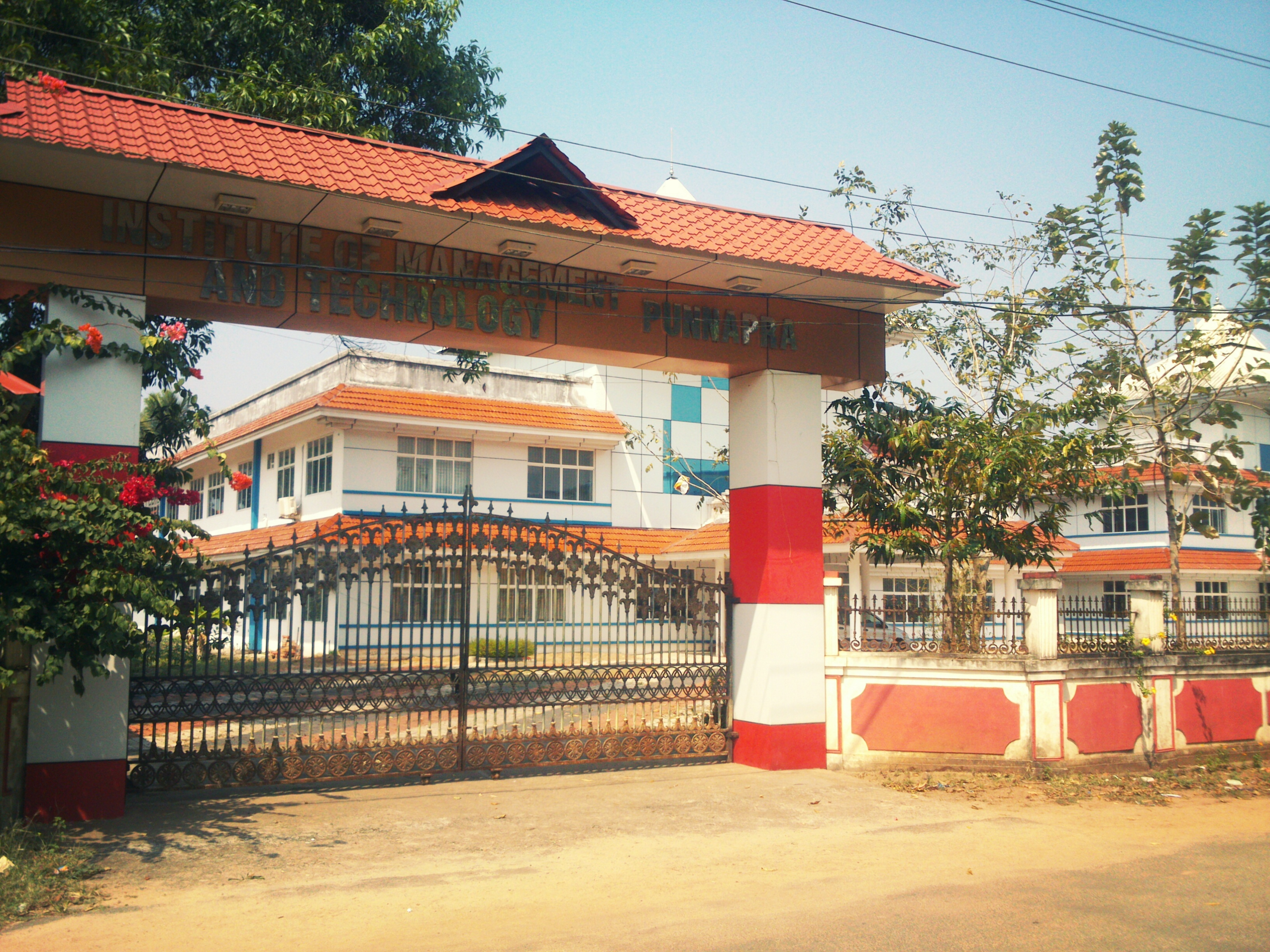
IMT Punnapra

Punnapra was part of the princely state of Travancore before the independence of India. In 1940s, Communist party developed a good influence among the workers in the coir industry and organised a strike for better wages. Sir C. P. Ramaswami Iyer, the diwan(prime minister) of Travancore intervened to resolve the labour issues, but situation worsened with the faction of workers demanding for Responsible Government, a political move against the rule of Sir C. P. Ramaswami Iyer. A landlord, Applon Aroj in Punnapra was given with police protection on demand and one demonstrator was shot dead in an agitation near to his house. A large number of strikers attacked the police camp, killed a four policemen and about 35 strikers were also killed. Government declared martial law and in the following army action about 300 people were massacred. The series of incidents is known as Punnapra-Vayalar uprising. There is a memorial known as the Punnapra-Vayalar uprising martyrs' column and every year, a procession is held from Valya chudukad in Alappuzha to the memorial on the date.

== Colleges ==
- College of Engineering and Management, Punnapra
- Government T D Medical College, Alappuzha
- Aravukad ITC, Punnapra Alappuzha
- Carmel polytechnic college
- Mar Gregorios College Punnapra

== Election Results ==
=== Panchayat Election 2025 ===
Grama Panchayats
Panchayat	Total Seats	Wards won			
Panchayat	Total Seats	LDF	UDF	NDA	OTH
Punnapra North	19	10	3	6	0
Punnapra South	19	4	11	4	0

District Panchayat

2025 Kerala local elections: Alappuzha Dist. Punnapra Division
Party	Candidate	Votes	%	±%
CPI(M)	Adv. R. Rahul	22,967	42.57	
INC	P. Udayakumar	20,194	37.42	
BJP	V. Baburaj	10,807	20.02	
Margin of victory		2,773	5.15	
Turnout		53,968		
CPI(M) hold		Swing		

=== Panchayat Election 2020 ===
Grama Panchayats
Panchayat	Total Seats	Wards won			
Panchayat	Total Seats	LDF	UDF	NDA	OTH
Punnapra North	17	13	2	2	0
Punnapra South	17	10	2	2	3

District Panchayat

2025 Kerala local elections: Alappuzha Dist. Punnapra Division
Party	Candidate	Votes	%	±%
CPI(M)	Geetha Babu	24,307	48.47	
INC	Kukku Unmesh	16,760	33.42	
BJP	Asha Rudrani	9,080	18.12	
Margin of victory		7,547	15.05	
Turnout		50,147		
CPI(M) hold		Swing		

=== Panchayat Election 2015 ===
Grama Panchayats
Panchayat	Total Seats	Wards won			
Panchayat	Total Seats	LDF	UDF	NDA	OTH
Punnapra North	17	10	4	1	2
Punnapra South	17	7	6	2	2

District Panchayat

2015 Kerala local elections: Alappuzha Dist. Punnapra Division
Party	Candidate	Votes	%	±%
CPI(M)	G. Venugopal	21,823	44.69	
INC	A. I. Muhammed Aslam	18,384	37.64	
BJP	D. Bhubaneswaran	8,630	17.67	
Margin of victory		3,439	7.05	
Turnout		48,837		
CPI(M) hold		Swing		
