= Paravur, Alappuzha =

Paravur Paravoor
- Village, Alappuzha
- Location in Kerala, India Paravur (India)
- Coordinates: 9.4532°N 76.3415°E
- Country: India
- State: Kerala
- District: Alappuzha

Government
  - Body: Punnapra North Panchayat

Languages
  - Official: Malayalam, English
- Time zone: UTC+5:30 (IST)
- Nearest city: Alappuzha
- Civic agency: Punnapra North Panchayat
- Climate: tropical (Köppen)

Paravur or Paravoor is a village in India near the town of Alappuzha in the Alappuzha district. It is part of the Punnapra North panchayat.

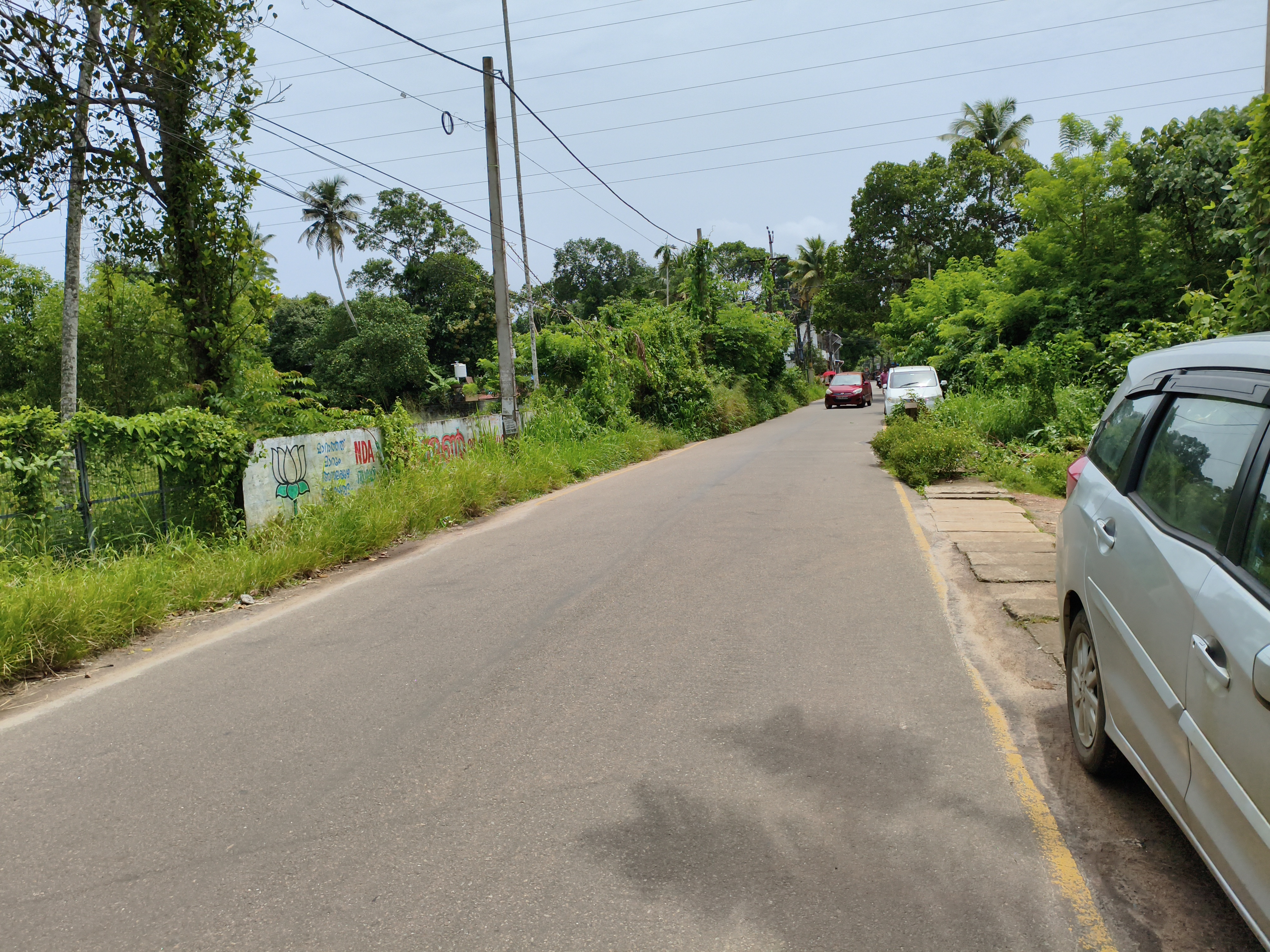
Paravur, Alappuzha

Paravoor is the fishing hub of Alappuzha and the majority of the people are from the fishing community. The beaches in Paravoor are the elongated extension of the Alappuzha beach with its famous sunset sights and the sea breeze ruffling through our hair. The jolly sight of people relaxing in the evening and children playing in the sand lifts one's mind beyond heights. The morning air hustles with the sweat of fisherman as they are back from their tiresome time at the sea. One of the best places to cool and calm your mind in the whole of Alappuzha.

== See also ==
- Paravur, Kollam place with a similar name near Kollam
- South Paravur place with a similar name near Kochi
