= Ambalapuzha South =

Panchayat in Alappuzha, Kerala

Ambalapuzha South is a panchayat and part of Ambalapuzha. It is in Alappuzha district, Kerala, India.
