= Ambalappuzha =

- Town
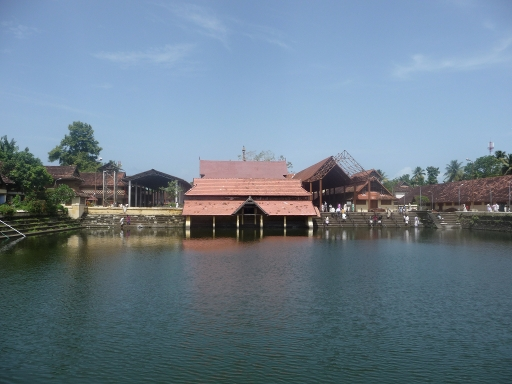
- Ambalappuzha Sri Krishna Temple

- Location in Kerala, India Ambalappuzha (India)
- Coordinates: 9°23′N 76°21′E
- Country: India
- State: Kerala
- Region: Central Travancore
- District: Alappuzha

Government
  - Panchayat President: Smt. Sathi S Nath

Area
  - Total: 9.18 km^{2} (3.54 sq mi)

Population (2011)
  - Total: 33,939
  - Density: 3,700/km^{2} (9,580/sq mi)

Languages
  - Official: Malayalam, English
- Time zone: UTC+5:30 (IST)
- PIN: 688561
- Vehicle registration: KL 04
- Sex ratio: 1034 ♂/♀
- Literacy: 92%
- Lok Sabha constituency: Alappuzha
- Vidhan Sabha constituency: Ambalappuzha
- Climate: Moderate (Köppen)
- Website: lsgkerala.in/ambalapuzhasouthpanchayat/

Ambalappuzha is a small coastal town in the Alappuzha district of Kerala state, India. It is located 14 km (8.7 mi) south of Alappuzha which is the district headquarters.

Ambalappuzha is divided into the two panchayats of Ambalapuzha North and Ambalapuzha South.

== Etymology ==
A combination of two Malayalam ambalam "temple" and puzha "river".

== Demographics ==
As of 2011 Census, Ambalappuzha had a population of 33,939 with 16,620 males and 17,319 females. Ambalappuzha rural village has an area of 9.18 km^{2} (3.54 sq mi) with 7,856 families residing in it. 10.5% of the population was under 6 years of age. Ambalappuzha had an average literacy of 93.2% higher than the national average of 74% and lower than state average of 94%; male literacy was 95.5% and female literacy was 90.9%.

== Geography ==
Ambalappuzha is a coastal town, near National Highway 66, about 13 kilometres (8.1 mi) south of Alappuzha. The Sree Krishna Temple is located 1.5 kilometres (0.93 mi) east of the town junction.

== Politics ==
Ambalappuzha assembly constituency is part of Alappuzha (Lok Sabha constituency).

== Election Results ==
=== Panchayat Election 2025 ===
District Panchayat

After Delimitation, 8 wards of Thakazhi Grama Panchayat, which were in Ambalappuzha division, have been transferred to Champakulam division.

2025 Kerala local elections: Alappuzha Dist. Ambalappuzha Division
Party	Candidate	Votes	%	±%
INC	A. R. Kannan	21,733	45.03	
CPI	E. K. Jayan	16,115	33.39	
BJP	Arun Anirudhan	10,411	21.57	
Margin of victory		5,618		
Turnout		48,259		
INC gain from CPI		Swing		

Block Panchayat

Based on the delimitation, a new division was formed in Ambalappuzha Block Panchayat, increasing the total number of divisions to 14.

Total seats	UDF	LDF	NDA	OTH
14	8	5	1	0

Based on delimitation, Two new wards each were formed in Ambalappuzha North and Ambalappuzha South grama panchayats, increasing the total number of wards to 20 in Ambalappuzha North and 17 in Ambalappuzha South.

Grama Panchayats
Panchayat	Total Seats	Wards won			
Panchayat	Total Seats	LDF	UDF	NDA	OTH
Ambalappuzha North	20	9	3	1	7
Ambalappuzha South	17	8	5	4	0

=== Panchayat Election 2020 ===
District Panchayat

2020 Kerala local elections: Alappuzha Dist. Ambalappuzha Division
Party	Candidate	Votes	%	±%
CPI	P. Anju	27,490	46.36	
INC	Bindu Baiju	19,858	33.50	
BJP	Susmitha Jobi	11,948	20.16	
Margin of victory		7,632		
Turnout		59,296		
CPI gain from INC		Swing		

Block Panchayat

Total seats	LDF	UDF	NDA	OTH
13	12	1	0	0

Grama Panchayats
Panchayat	Total Seats	Wards won			
Panchayat	Total Seats	LDF	UDF	NDA	OTH
Ambalappuzha North	18	8	3	1	6
Ambalappuzha South	15	7	0	6	2

=== Panchayat Election 2015 ===
District Panchayat

2015 Kerala local elections: Alappuzha Dist. Ambalappuzha Division
Party	Candidate	Votes	%	±%
INC	A. R. Kannan	25,428	45.38	
CPI	Kamal M. Makkiyil	22,112	39.47	
BJP	Kottaram Unnikrishnan	8,497	15.16	
Margin of victory		3,316		
Turnout		56,037		
INC hold		Swing		

Block Panchayat

Total seats	UDF	LDF	NDA	OTH
13	8	5	0	0

Grama Panchayats
Panchayat	Total Seats	Wards won			
Panchayat	Total Seats	LDF	UDF	NDA	OTH
Ambalappuzha North	18	7	2	4	5
Ambalappuzha South	15	10	2	2	1
