= Punnapra North =

Indian demographic area

Punnapra North is a panchayat and part of Punnapra. It is in Alappuzha district, Kerala, India. Borders are Alappuzha municipality in north, nedumudy panchayth in east, punnapra south panchayath in south and Arabian Sea in west.

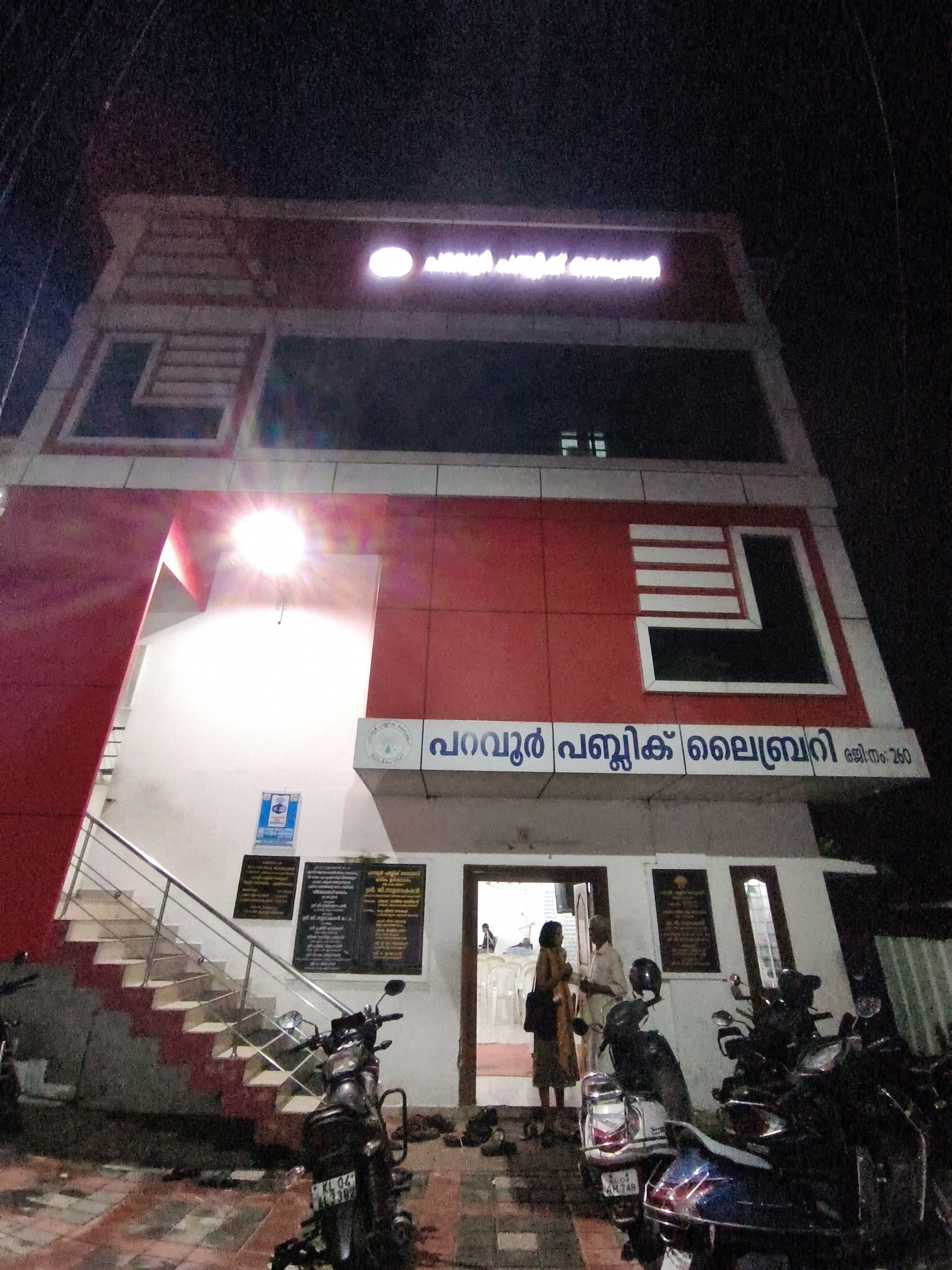
Paravur Public Library in Punnapra North
