= Punnapra South =

Panchayat in Kerala, India

Punnapra South is a grama panchayat and part of Punnapra village, in Alappuzha district, Kerala, India. It was created by dividing the erstwhile Punnapra panchayath into north and south. The placename is much famous for the 1946 Punnapra-Vayalar revolt. Nearness to beach and presence of paddy fields makes here a place with rarest geography and hence one of the good places for sightseeing. The NH-47 and Ernakulam-Kayamkulam coastal railway line passes through Punnapra. There is a railway station at Punnapra.

Punnapra south panchayath is further divided into 15 wards on either side of NH-47.Punnapra market is the business centre and heart of the panchayath. Many educational institutions are situated in punnapra like Carmel poly technic college, carmel engineering college, mar gregorious college etc.
