= Srivallavan Kotai =

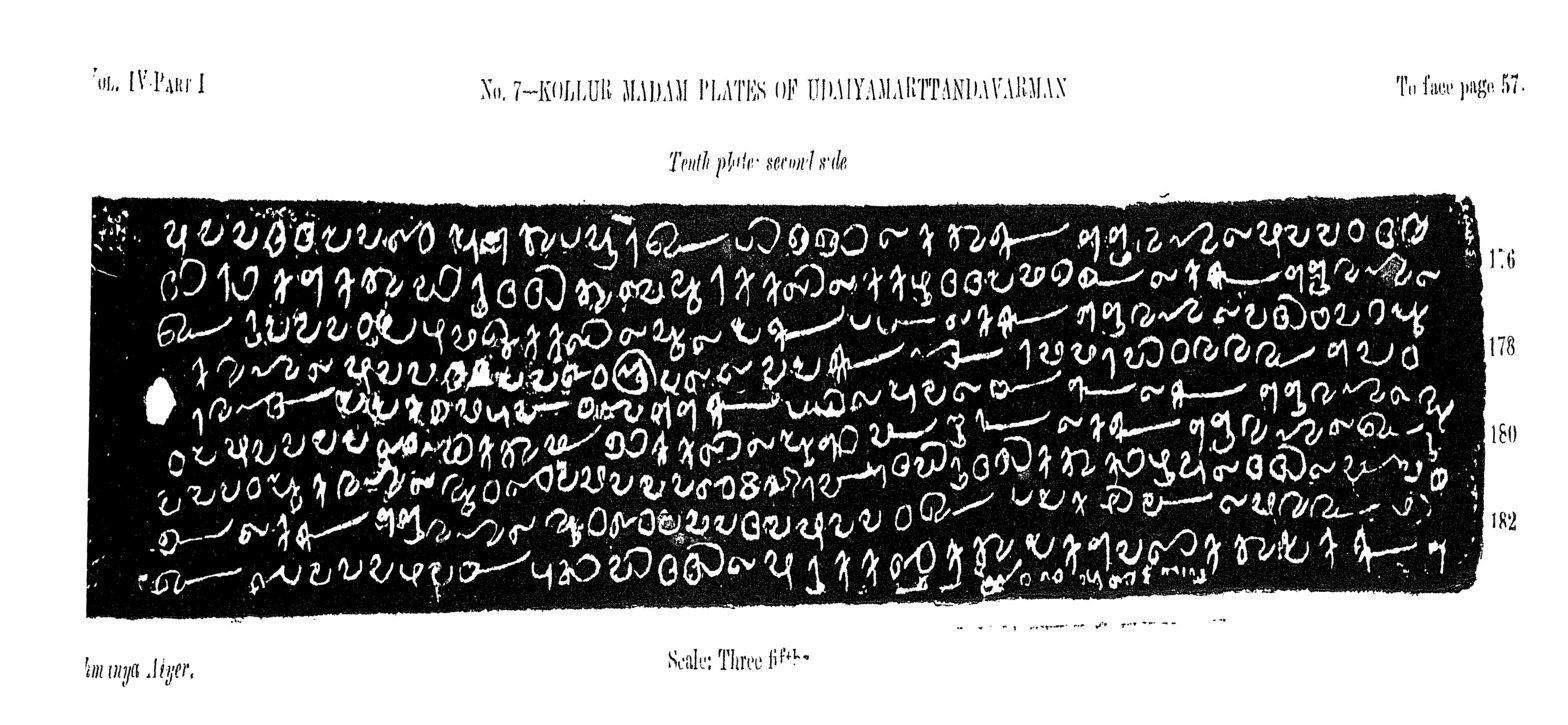
Kollur Madhom plates

Srivallavan Kothai Varma (fl. c. late 10th century CE; also known as Sri Vallabha Goda Varma) was a ruler of the country of Venad (based at the port of Kollam; in present-day Kerala, India) under the medieval Chera state of Kerala.

Vallavan Kothai and his immediate family are best remembered for their extensive endowments to several Hindu temples along the Pamba river, including the Chengannur Temple, the Thiruvanvandoor Temple, and the Thrikkodithanam Temple. It is also recorded that his mother founded the Devideveswaram Temple. Adithya Umayamma, a possible close relative of Vallavan Kothai, founded the Ayirur Temple.

He is also remembered for issuing a decree that constitutes the earliest surviving epigraphical record explicitly referring to the Kollam Era (the Malayalam Calendar). It is recorded that Vallavan Kothai ruled from the Panankavil Kovilakam at the port of Kollam.

Vallavan Kothai was succeeded as ruler of Venad by Govardhana Marthanda.

== Associated epigraphic records ==
- Mamballi copper plate (c. 973/74 CE)
- Thiruvanvandoor inscriptions
- Thrikkodithanam inscription
- Kollur Madhom plates
