= List of places of worship in Chengannur =

This is a list of places of worship in the Kerala municipality of Chengannur.

== Hindu temples ==
- Chengannur Mahadeva Temple
- Cheriyanad Sree Balasubrahmanya Swami Temple
- Thrichittatt Maha Vishnu Temple
- Aranmula Parthasarathy Temple
- Puliyur Mahavishnu Temple
- Thiruvanvandoor Mahavishnu Temple
- Sree Narayanapuram Thrikkayil Temple, Perissery
- Anandeshwaram Mahadeva Temple, Pandanad
- Kallisseri Azhakiyakavu Devi Temple

== Christian Churches ==
- St. Mary's Orthodox Cathedral, Puthencavu
- Pazhaya Suriyani Pally (Old Syrian Church)
- India Pentecostal Church of God
- Assemblies of God in India
