= Mundankavu =

Mundancavu
- Town
- Location in Kerala, India Mundancavu (India)
- Coordinates: 9°19′54″N 76°36′19.5″E
- Country: India
- State: Kerala
- Region: South India
- District: Alappuzha

Government
  - Type: Municipality
  - Body: Chengannur Municipality Ward 1

Population (2001)
  - Total: 1,500

Languages
  - Official: English, Malayalam, Hindi
- Time zone: UTC+5:30 (IST)
- PIN: 689121
- Landline code: 0479
- Vehicle registration: KL-30
- Nearest city: Chengannur
- Assembly constituency: Chengannur

Mundankavu is a village situated 2 kilometres (1.2 mi) from Chengannur town centre in Alappuzha district, Kerala, India. It lies on the banks of the river Pampa. It is known as Vadakekkara which is situated on the northern banks of River Pampa. Mundancavu(Mundankavu) ward is part of Chengannur Municipal town.

== Historic and Notable landmarks ==
- Erapuzha Bridge, (First concrete bridge in Kerala under British rule supervised by Italian Engineer Mr. Giuseppe Marini) across [Pamba] river on MC road is one of the oldest bridges which connected Chengannur town to Thiruvanvandoor Panchayath( Kallissery). A state of the art modern 2 line bridge is built recently and the traffic is now through the new bridge. The old bridge is still in perfect condition and being used by local people.
- Thazhamon Madhom, the members of this madhom are the traditional head priests of Sabarimala temple.
- Edavana Madhom or Edavana Mutts
- Mampilly Madhom, Mampilly copperplate Vallabhakotha-chera 973 AD.

== Historic importance ==
Historically, Chengannur village was ruled by "Vanjipuzha Chiefs". The "Vanjipuzha Principality" Palace situated near the river Pamba was located here before it was demolished. The Vanjipuzha chief are descendants of early rulers of chengannur "Vanchipura Thampurans" .The palace had close architectural similarities to that of Thrichittatt Maha Vishnu Temple. They were Kshatriyas of Nair origin. Venad queens, some of the Kupaka women from the Ay family of Kizhperur settled here to be married by the Madampi of Vanjipuzha in the reign of . Velu Thampi Dalawa before escaping to Mannadi was sheltered by Vanjipuzha Madhom in Adoor. Vanjipuzha Chief has a relevant position in the history of Travancore and they had the right to sit along with the Maharaja of Travancore. They were appointed protectors of the temples at Vaikom and [Chengannur_Mahadeva_Temple].

== Major Institutions ==
- JBS School Mundancavu
- Post Office Mundancavu
- Kerala Viswakarma Sabha Head Quarters
- NSS Chengannur Taluk Headquarters
- Industrial Estate Mundancavu
- Amballoor Clinic ( Hospital)

== Culture and Religion ==
Mundancavu is in the banks of Pamba which influenced the culture of this area. There are two "Chundan Vallam" (Snake boats) participating in Aranmula Boat Race hails from Mundancavu- Mundancavu Palliyodam and Kodiyattukara Palliyodam. Padayani is a traditional temple artform performed as part of the festival in the Vadasserikkavu Devi Temple.Thrichittatt Maha Vishnu Temple is an ancient Vishnu Temple which is one of the 108 Divya Desam.

The Chengannur Suriyani Church, built by the Vanjipuzha Chiefs, is famous for its unique architecture is near Mundancavu. The Church is shared by both the Marthoma and Orthodox Christians. There is a 33.5 feet tall cross said to have been carved from a single stone is a minor attraction.

Chengannur-Parumala Road goes through Mundankavu which is the main road uses by thousands of pilgrims to St. Peter and St. Paul's Church, Parumala

== Transport ==
Mundancavu is well-connected by road and rail. State Highway 1 (SH1), popularly known as the MC Road, passes through the heart of this place and connects to state capital, Thiruvananthapuram and Angamaly in Eranakulam District. The Chengannur - Kottayam stretch of the MC Road is also part of the NH 183 which stretches between Kollam and Theni.

=== Road ===
Mundancavu is located in MC Road and ordinary buses stops at the junction. Long distance bus stops are available at Chengannur Town which is 2 km south from Mundancavu. Some of the Major destinations from Chengannur are Thiruvananthapuram, Ernakulam, Thrissur, Kozhikode, Mangalore, Mukambika, Kanyakumari, Coimbatore, Palani, Kannur and Wayanad

=== Rail ===
Chengannur Railway Station (station code: CNGR), is an important railway station between Kollam and Kottayam. It is a major railway station in the Thiruvananthapuram railway division of the Southern Railway Zone (India). This is 2 km from Mundankavu
