= Perissery =

Village in Alappuzha District, Kerala, India

Coordinates: 9°18′36″N 76°36′01″E

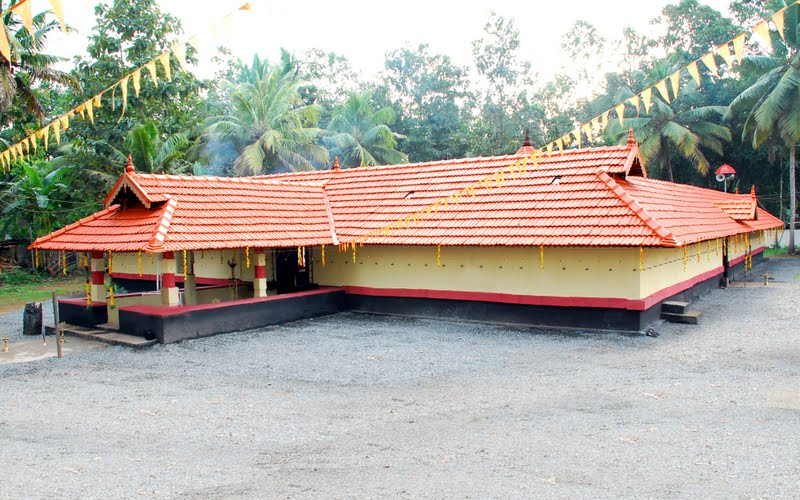
Sree Narayanapuram Thrikkayil Temple

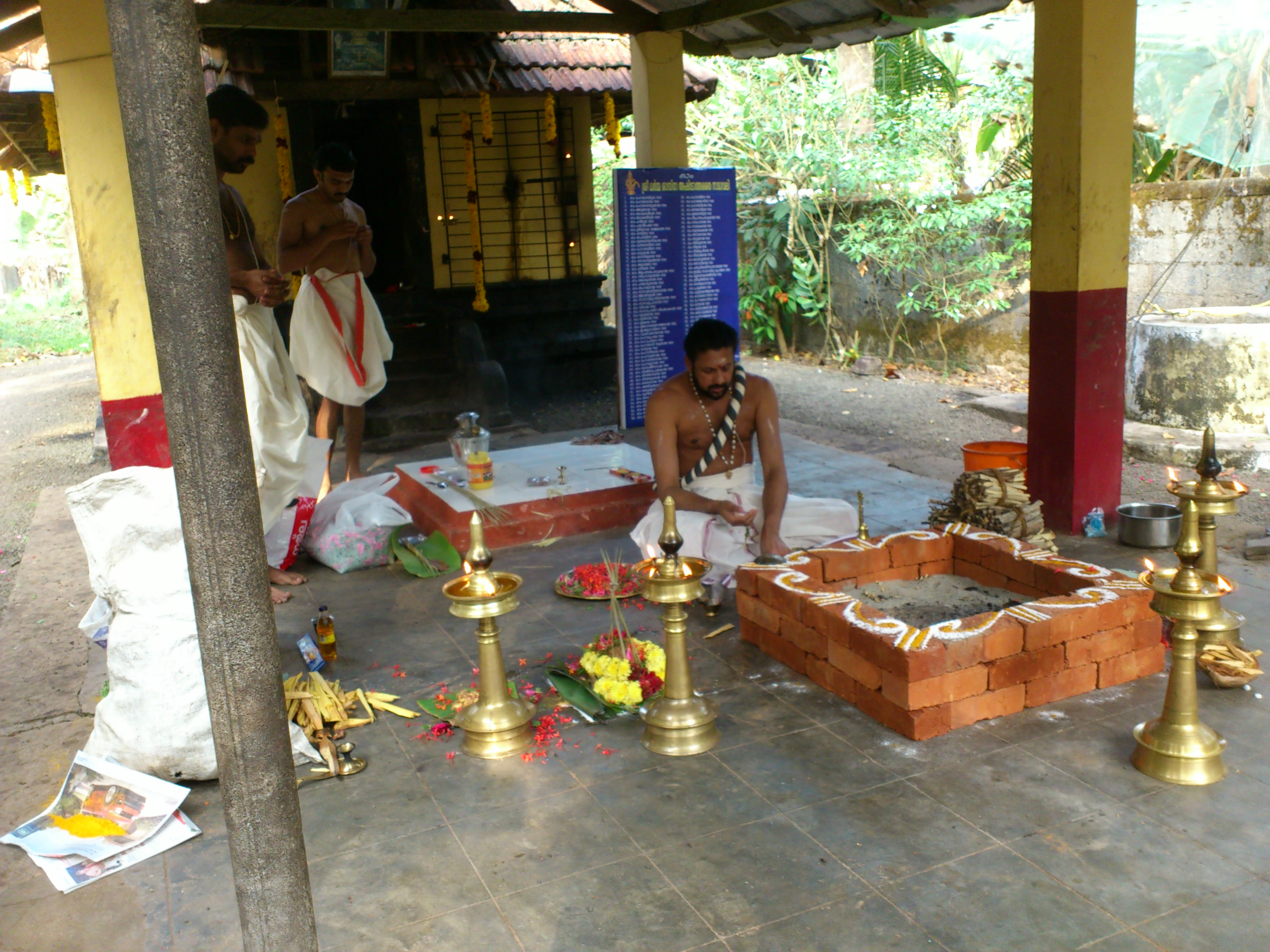
Pazhayar Sree Dharma Sastha Temple

Perissery is a village situated 1 kilometre (0.62 mi) west of Chengannur Railway Station in Alappuzha district, Kerala, India.

== Religious buildings ==
The village contains the Pazhayattil Devi Temple and others such as Sreenarayanapuram Thrikkayil Kshetra, Pazhayar Sree Dharmasastha Temple, Pazhayattil Devi Temple, Peroorkulangara Sree Subramanya Swami Kshetra are located in this village. St. Mary's Orthodox Syrian church (Palliyil Family Church) is located in Perissery. The Geevarghese kathannar tomb is situated left side of Altar of orthodox valiyapally. Pandavan Para, a cave where the Pandavas in the Mahabharata epic were supposed to have lived is very near this village. The old Syrian church, built in 365 AD, is located here.

== Schools ==
A technical higher secondary school and high school is situated in this village. This will be upgraded to College of Applied Science from the academic year 2014- 2015 without any financial commitment on the part of Government.
