= Panankavil Palace =

Panankavil Palace, also Panankavu, was a royal palace (kovilakam) located in the port of Kollam, in the country of Venad, in southern Kerala. The earliest known reference to the palace dates to the mid-10th century CE, while the latest reference is from early 12th century CE. The exact location of this estate has not been identified.

It is speculated that the Panankavil palace first functioned as the estate of the rulers of Venad before becoming the residence of the last Chera ruler of Kerala. It is believed to have stood somewhere between the old Ganapathi Temple and the Lakshminatha temple (near the tobacco warehouse) in Kollam.

It is also believed that the palace was linked to the Chiravay house of the Venad family, a branch originally associated with Kollam.

== References to the Panankavil Palace ==
- Mampalli copper plate (c. 973/74 CE) – mentions the ruler of Venad holding a council at the Panankavil Palace (the "Kottil" within the Panainkavin Koyil) in connection with donations to the Chengannur Temple.
- Kollam Rameswaram temple inscription (c.1102 CE) – mentions the Chera ruler of Kerala residing at the Panankavil Palace (Panainkavin Koyilakam) and holding a council with his feudatories, including the rulers of Eranad and Venad.
