= List of colleges affiliated to the University of Kerala =

There are 204 colleges affiliated to the University of Kerala, which is in Thiruvananthapuram in the state of Kerala, India. This list is categorised into two main parts, Autonomous colleges and Non-Autonomous colleges. Autonomous colleges are bestowed academic independence, primarily in order to enhance the level of education in those colleges.

A college may be classified as government run, private unaided, or private aided. A government college receives full funding from the Government of Kerala, while a private unaided college receives no funding from the government. In a private aided college, one or more of its courses receives partial funding from the government.

== Affiliated colleges ==
Name of College	Year of Establishment
GOVT/AIDED Arts and Science Colleges	
Colleges in Alappuzha District
1. Bishop Moore College, Mavelikara	1964
2. Christian College, Chengannur	1964
3. MSM College, Kayamkulam	1964
4. N.S.S. College, Cherthala	1964
5. SN College, Cherthala	1964
6. SD College, Alappuzha	1946
7. St. Joseph's College for Women, Alappuzha	1954
8. St. Michael's College, Cherthala	1967
9. TKMM College, Nangiarkulangara	1964
10. SN College, Chengannur	1981
11. Sree Ayyappa College, Eramallikara, Thiruvanvandoor	1995
Colleges in Kollam District
12.Fatima Mata National College, Kollam	1951
13. Sree Narayana College for Women, Kollam	1951
14. SN College, Kollam	1948
Govt. Arts & science college, Thazhava Karunagappally	2016
38. Baby John Memorial Government College, Chavara	1981
39. Kumpalathu Sanku Pillai Memorial Devaswom Board College (KSMDB College), Sasthamcottah	1964
40. TKM College of Arts & Science, Karicode	1965
41. St. Gregorios College, Kottarakkara	1964
42. St. Stephen's College, Pathanapuram	1964
43. NSS College Nilamel	1964
44. St. John's College, Anchal	1964
45. Sree Narayana College, Punalur	1965
46. MMNSS College Kottiyam	1981
47. SN College, Chathannur	1981
48. Ayyankali Memorial Arts and Science College, Punalur	2015
Colleges in Pathanamthitta District.
15. St. Cyril's College, Adoor	1981
16. N.S.S. College, Pandalam	1950
Colleges in Thiruvananthapuram District
17. Government College for Women, Thiruvananthapuram	1897
18. St. Xavier's College, Thumba	1964
19. University College Thiruvananthapuram	1866
20. Government College, Kariavattom	1997
21. Government Sanskrit College, Thiruvananthapuram	1889
22. Government College, Attingal	1975
23. Government College, Nedumangad	1981
24. Kunjukrishnan Nadar Memorial Government Arts and Science College	1982
25. All Saints College, Thiruvananthapuram	1964
26.H.H. Maharani Sethu Parvathi Bai N.S.S. College for Women	1951
27. Mahatma Gandhi College, Kesavadasapuram	1945
28. Mar Ivanios College, Nalanchira	1949
29. S.N.College, Sivagiri, Varkala	1964
30. Sree Narayana College, Chempazhanthy	1964
31. VTM NSS College, Dhanuvachapuram	1964
32. Government Arts College, Thiruvananthapuram	1948
33. Christian College, Kattakada	1965
34. Iqbal College, Peringammala	1964
35.. Mannaniya College of Arts & Science, Pangode	1995
36. Loyola College of Social Sciences, Sreekariyam	1963
37. aims Medical/Engineering Training, Balaramapuram	1997
Fine Arts Colleges (Government)
49. College of Fine Arts, Thiruvananthapuram	1979
50. Raja Ravi Varma College of Fine Arts, Mavelikara	1999
Music college (Government)
51. Sri Swathi Thirunal College of Music, Thycaud, Thiruvananthapuram	1999
Physical Education (Government)
52. Lakshmi Bai National College of Physical Education, Kariavattom, Thiruvananthapuram	1989
Law Colleges (Government)
53. Government Law College, Thiruvananthapuram	1954
Private
54. The Kerala Law Academy Law College, Peroorkada, Thiruvananthapuram	1968
Training Colleges
55. UEI Global Institute of Hotel Management Thiruvananthapuram	
56. College of Teacher Education, Thycaud, Thiruvananthapuram	1911
57. SN Training College, Nedumganda, Varkala, Thiruvananthapuram	1958
58. Mar Theophilus Training College, Bethany Hills, Thiruvananthapuram	1956
59. Karmela Rani Training College, Kollam	1960
60. Mount Tabor Training College, Pathanapuram	1960
61. NSS Training College, Pandalam	1957
62. Peet Memorial Training College, Mavelikara	1960
Medical Colleges
63. Government Medical College, Thiruvananthapuram	1950
64. Thirumala Devaswom Medical College, Alappuzha	1963
Ayurveda Medical College
65. Govt. Ayurveda Medical College, Thiruvananthapuram	1989
Homeopathy Medical Colleges
66. Govt. Homoepathic Medical College, Iranimuttom, Thiruvananthapuram	1983
67. Sri Vidhyadhiraja Homoeopathic Medical College, Nemom, Thiruvananthapuram.(Aided from 2002 onwards)	2001
Dental Colleges (Government)
68. Govt. Dental College, Thiruvananthapuram	
SELF- FINANCING COLLEGES
Arts & Science Colleges
1. Sree Sankara Vidyapeedom College, Nagaroor P O, Kilimanoor
2.Sree Naryana Guru College Of Advanced Studies Chempazhanthy
3. AJ College of Science & Technology, Thonnakkal, Thiruvananthapuram	1995
4. Emmanuel College, Vazhichal, Kudappanamoodu, Thiruvananthapuram	1995
5. National College, Manacaud, Thiruvananthapuram	1995
6. CHMM College for Advanced Studies, Palayamkunnu, Varkala	1995
7. KVVS College of Science & Technology, Kaithaparambu, Adoor	1995
8. Sree Vidhyadhiraja College of Arts & Science, Karunagapally	1995
9. College of Applied Science Adoor, Pathanamthitta	1995
10. College of Applied Science Mavelikara, Alappuzha	1995
11. National Institute of Speech &Hearing, Poojappura, Thiruvananthapuram	2002
12. Sree Narayana College of Technology, Vadakkevila, Kollam	2003
13. PMSA Pookoya Thangal Memorial Arts &Science College, Kadakkal, Kollam	2003
14. Naipunya School of Management, Near Manorama Jn, Cherthala	2005
15. College of Applied Science, Dhanuvachapuram, Thiruvananthapuram	
16. Sree Narayana Guru Memorial Arts & Science College	
17. Sree Narayana Guru Memorial Catering College, Cherthala, Alappuzha	
18. SNGM Arts & Science College, Valamangalam South, Thuravoor, Cherthala	
19. White Memorial College of Arts & Science for Women, Pannachamoodu, Thiruvananthapuram. Kerala
21. Dr. Palpu College of Arts and Science, Pangode - Puthussery, Mathira	2014
22. KICMA College, Neyyar Dam, Kattakada	2011
23. Christ Nagar College, Maranalur, Thiruvananthapuram	2012
Training Colleges
19. National Training College for Women, Pazhakutty, Nedumangad	1995
20. Fathima Memorial Training College, Vadakkevila, Kollam	1997
21. CSI College of Education, Parassala, Thiruvananthapuram	1995
22. Baselious Marthoma Mathews Training College, Kottarakara	1995
23. Mannam Memorial Training College, Vilakudy, Kollam	1995
24.* National Training College, Pravachambalam* ( *steps are being initiated for disaffiliation )	1995
25. Sobha College of Teacher Education, S.L.Puram, Cherthala	2003
26. KNMKNMS Training College, Vellarada, Thiruvananthapuram	1995
27. BNV College of Teacher Education, Thiruvallam, Thiruvananthapuram	2005
28. KTCT College of Teacher Education, Kaduvayil, Thottacadu, Thiruvananthapuram	2005
29. New B Ed College, Nellimoodu, Thiruvananthapuram	2005
30. H.H.Marthoma MathewsII Training College, Adoor	2005
31. Jameela Beevi Memorial Centre for Teacher Education, Kayamkulam	2005
32. St. Thomas Training College, Mukkolakkal, Thiruvananthapuram	2005
33. MAET Training College, Nettayam, Thiruvananthapuram	2005
34. St. Jacob's Training College, Menamkulam, Thiruvananthapuram	2005
35. Emmanuel College of B. Ed Training, Vazhichal, Kudappanamoodu, Thiruvananthapuram	2005
36. Christ Nagar College of Education, Thiruvallam, Thiruvananthapuram	2005
37. RV Training College, Valakam, Kottarakara, Kollam	2005
38. Buddha College of Teacher Education, Muthukulam North, Alappuzha	2005
39. Mannam Foundation Centre for Education Technology, Poruvazhy, Edakkal, Kollam	2005
40. Manjappara Educational and Charitable Trust B.Ed Centre, Manjapara, Ayur	2005
41. Sree Narayana Training College, Sreekandeswaram, Poochakkal, Cherthala	2005
42. Fathima Memorial Training College, Umayanalloor, Kollam	2005
43. Sabarigiri College of Education, Anchal, Kollam	2005
44. College of Teacher Education, Arkanoor, Ayoor, Kollam	2005
45. Victory College of Teacher Education, Olathanni, Thiruvananthapuram	2005
46. Millath College of Teacher Education, Kunnathur, Kollam	2005
47. SNGM B.Ed College, Valamangalam South, Thuravur, Cherthala	2005
48. Sri Vidyadhiraja Model College of Teacher Education, Vendar PO, Kottarakara, Kollam	2005
49. Iqbal Training College, Peringammala, Thiruvananthapuram	2005
50. Kaviyattu College of Education, Pirappencode, Thiruvananthapuram	
51. Sree Narayana Guru Kripa Trust B.Ed College, Pothencode, Thiruvananthapuram	
52. Haneefa Kunju Memorial College of Education, Umayanallur, Kollam	2005
53. Valiyam Memorial College of Teacher Education, Edappallikkotta, Chavara, Kollam	
54. Jamia Training College, Chithara, Kollam	
55. KPM BEd Training College, Cheriyavelinalloor, Oyoor, Kollam	
56. Sree Narayana Guru College of Legal Studies, Kollam	
57. METCA Institute of Teacher Education, Chavarcode, Palayamkunnu, Varkala, Thiruvananthapuram

== Architecture colleges ==
Name of the college	Year of establishment
College of Architecture, Trivandrum, C.A.T	2011

== Autonomous colleges ==
1. Mar Ivanios College, Thiruvananthapuram

2. Fatima Matha National College, Kollam

== Engineering colleges ==
The only engineering college affiliated to university of Kerala is University College of Engineering, Kariavattom.It is the one and only Constituent College of the University of Kerala. From the academic year 2015-16, all other engineering colleges affiliated to the University of Kerala except UCEK are now affiliated to KTU.

== M B A colleges ==
71. DCSMAT Trivandrum, Kazhakuttom	2006
72. Lead college of management, dhoni, Palakkad	2009
73. TKM Institute of Management, Kollam	1995
74. Member Sree Narayana Pillai Institute of Management & Technology, Madappally, Chavara, Kollam	2002
75. Bishop Jerome Institute, Kollam	2011
76. Allama Iqbal Institute of Management, Daivapura, Peringamala, Nedumangad, Thiruvananthapuram	2003
77. Snehacharya Institute of Management & Technology, Karuvatta, Alappuzha	
78. G Karunakaran Memorial Co-Operative College of Management and Technology, Nedumangadu, Kerala	2010
MCA Colleges	
76. K VM College of Engg & Information Technology, Cherthala	2001
77. KVVS Institute of Technology, Kaithaparambu, Adoor, Pathanamthitta	2002
78. Mar Thoma Institute of Technology, Chadayamangalam, Ayur	2002
78. Mar Baselios Institute of Technology, Anchal, Kollam	2003
80. Sree Narayana Institute of Technology, Vadakkevila, Kollam	2003
Nursing Colleges	
81.Holy Cross College of Nursing, Kottiyam, Kollam	2002
82. C.S.I College of Nursing, Karakonam, Thiruvananthapuram	2002
83. St Joseph's College of Nursing, Anchal, Kollam	2002
84. KVM College of Nursing, Cherthala, Alappuzha	2002
85. Sree Narayana Trusts Medical Mission College of Nursing, hathannur, Kollam	2004
86. Bishop Benziger College of Nursing, Vadakkevila, Kollam	2004
87. Sivagiri Sree Narayana Medical Mission College of Nursing, Sreenivasapuram, Varkala	2004
88. Archana College of Nursing, Pandalam	2004
89. Upasana College of Nursing, Kollam	2005
90. Vijaya College of Nursing, Kottarakkara, Kollam	2005
91. Azeezia College of Nursing, Meeyannoor, Kollam	
Dental Colleges (Private)	
92. PMS College of Dental Science & Research, Vattappara, Thiruvananthapuram	2002
93. Azeezia College of Dental Science & Research, Meeyannoor, Kollam	2005
Siddha College	
94. Santhigiri Siddha Medical College, Koliyakode, Thiruvananthapuram	2002
Ayurveda Medical College	
95. Pankaja Kasthuri Ayurveda Medical College, Kattakada, Thiruvananthapuram	2002
96. Sree Narayana Institute of Ayurvedic Studies & Research, Karimpinpuzha, Puthur, Kollam	2004
Medical College	
97. Dr Somerwell Memorial CSI Medical College, Karakkonam, Thiruvananthapuram	2002
98. Sree Gokulam Medical College & Research Foundation, Venjaramoodu, Thiruvananthapuram	2005
99. SUT Academy of Medical Sciences, Vattappara, Thiruvananthapuram	2006
Pharmacy College	
100. St. Joseph's College of Pharmacy, Muttom, Cherthala	2004
101. Mar Dioscorus College of Pharmacy, Alathara, Sreekariyam, Thiruvananthapuram	2004
102. Dale ViewCollege of Pharmacy & Research Centre, Poovachal, Thiruvananthapuram	2003
103. Ezhuthachan National Academy Pharmacy College, Marayamuttom, Neyyattinkara, Thiruvananthapuram	2003
104. National College, Manacaud, Thiruvananthapuram	1995
105. A.J College Thonnakkal, Thiruvananthapuram	-
