= K. M. Cherian =

K. M. Cherian may refer to:

- K. M. Cherian (doctor) (1942–2025), Indian heart surgeon
- K. M. Cherian (journalist) (1897–1973), Indian journalist
