= Viralminda Nayanar =

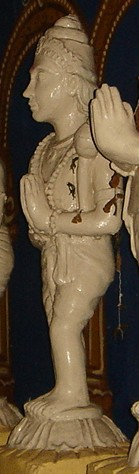

Personal life
- Born: 8-9th century CE; Chengannur
- Honors: Nayanar saint

Religious life
- Religion: Hinduism
- Philosophy: Shaivism, Bhakti

Viralminda Nayanar, also known as Viranmindar (Viranmintar), Viranmintan and Viranminda Nayanar (Viranminta Nayanar), is a Nayanar saint, venerated in the Hindu sect of Shaivism. He is generally counted as the sixth in the list of 63 Nayanars. He was a contemporary of Sundarar (8th-9th century CE). He along with Cheraman Perumal Nayanar are the two Nayanars from Kerala (Malayala Nadu). Viralminda Nayanar is described in legends as the reason Sundarar composed a hymn to the Nayanar saints, which became the first compilation of the list.

== Life ==
The life of Viralminda Nayanar is described in the Periya Puranam by Sekkizhar (12th century), which is a hagiography of the 63 Nayanars. Viralminda Nayanar was born in Sengunru (Sengkunroor) (generally identified with modern-day Chengannur) in the hilly terrain of Malainadu, modern-day Indian state of Kerala. The region was then under the reign of the Chera kings. He is regarded as a historical figure (8th-9th century), contemporary of Sundarar and the Chera king Rajashekhara Varman (Cheraman Perumal Nayanar, reign: 820- 844), both are venerated as Nayanars. Viralminda Nayanar and Cheraman Perumal Nayanar are the only two Nayanars from Kerala. The mintan/mintar is an honorific in his name.

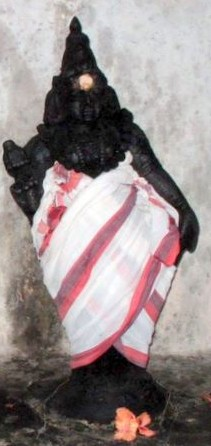
To pacify Viralminda, Sundarar (pictured), who composed a hymn to the Nayanars, the first compilation of the Nayanar list.

Viralminda Nayanar was a Vellalar, a caste of agricultural land owners. He was a great devotee of Shiva, the patron god of Shaivism. He believed that honouring the devotees of Shiva is a greater form of service to Shiva, than worshipping Shiva himself. He travelled to various temples of Shiva and finally reached Thiruvarur, famous for its Thyagaraja Temple dedicated to Shiva. He saw devotees of Shiva called atiyar ("servants") seated in the Devasrayam, the thousand-pillared mandapa (hall) in the temple and prostrated to them and stayed in their company. He decreed that others should also pay their respects to the atiyar, before worshipping the lingam (aniconic symbol of Shiva worshipped in temples) in the garbhagriha (sanctum sanatorium). Once, Sundarar, one of the most celebrated Nayanar saints, came to the shrine and went straight to the garbhagriha, without bowing to the atiyar. This offended Viralminda, who not only excommunicated Sundarar from Shaivism, but also Thyagaraja, the form of Shiva worshipped in the temple who insulted the devotees by accepting Sundarar's worship.

To placate Viralminda, Sundarar composed the Tiruthonda Thogai ("The List of Holy Devotees"), a hymn to Nayanar saints, which is the first compilation of the list. The list of Nayanars was crystallized in the Periya Puranam with addition of Sundarar in the list of the 62 saints of Tiruthonda Thogai. The Periya Puranam continues with praising Viralminda Nayanar as the raison d'etre for the Nayanars' list and states that he received Shiva's grace and reached Kailash, Shiva's abode after his death. He was made the leaders of the ganas, attendants of Shiva at Kailash.

A legend says that after Sundarar insulted the devotees, Viralminda Nayanar pursued Sundarar with his axe. When Sundarar was just within the grasp of Viralminda, Thyagaraja rescued Sundarar by hiding him in the temple wall. A shrine (ottu thiyagaraja shrine) marks the event and spot where Viralminda is worshipped in the Thyagaraja_Temple.

While some accounts narrate that the composition of Tiruthonda Thogai reconciled the differences between Viralminda Nayanar and Sundarar, others say that he never forgave Thyagaraja, Sundarar and the people of Thiruvarur and left Thiruvarur. He vowed never to enter Thiruvarur. Viralminda was angry with Sundarar as he used Thyagaraja to pacify the warth of his wife Paravai. He was upset with Thyagaraja for his partiality with Sundarar, despite all his faults. He was enraged with the god when he heard Thyagaraja gave Sundarar a divine vision.

Viralminda settled in the village of Vandampalai, outside Thiruvarur. He used to serve lunch to the devotees every day and would ask for their village before serving them. He would kill any one who came from Thiruvarur with his axe. Once, Thyagaraja, disguised himself as a devotee and came to Viralminda's house. Viralminda's wife welcomed him and asked him his village. He said he belonged to Thiruvarur; she immediately warned him about Viralminda's hatred of Thiruvarur and its people and requested him to lie about his village. The devotee refused to do so, but requested the wife to keep the axe on Viralminda's left hand, instead of the usual right. She complied. When Viralminda heard the devotee belonged to Thiruvarur, he reached for his axe, but did not find it in its usual place. The delay helped the devotee escape, but Viralminda chased him with his axe. The devotee entered the limits of Thiruvarur and Viralminda unconsciously broke his vow, following him. Viralminda chopped off his own legs as penance. Thyagaraja revealed his divine form as Shiva and blessed Viralminda for his devotion. The divine vision also led to a truce between Viralminda, Thyagaraja and Sundarar. The Shiva temple in Vandampalai was built in memory of the event.

== Remembrance ==
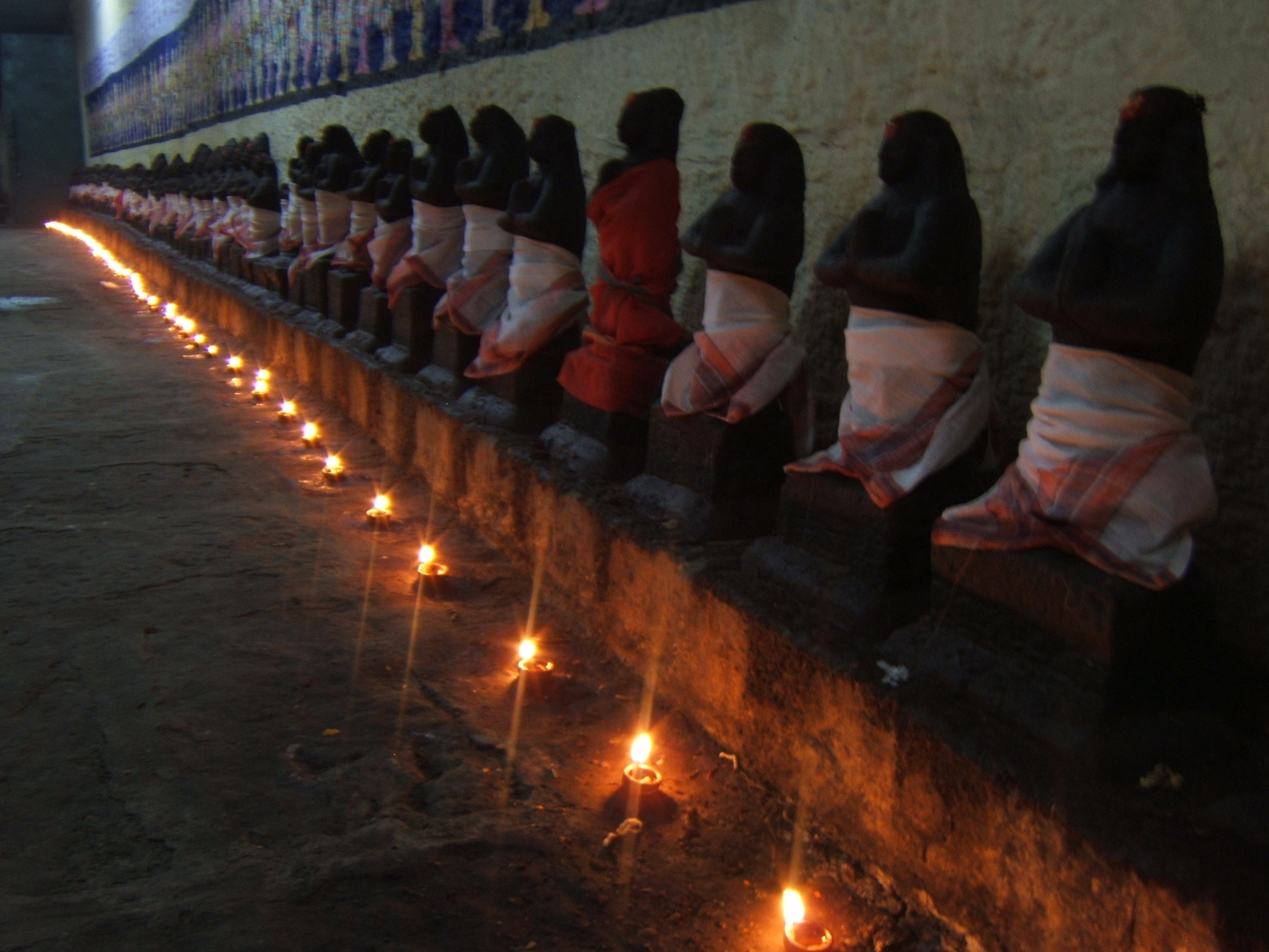
The images of the Nayanars are found in many Shiva temples in Tamil Nadu.

Sundarar venerates Viralminda (called Viranmintan of Kunrai) as a Nayanar in the Tiruthonda Thogai. The Mucukundasahasranaman, a "liturgy" dedicated to Thyagaraja, which mainly speaks about his love for Sundarar, also recalls the devotion of Viralminda Nayanar. Viralminda Nayanar has shrines in the Thiruvarur and Vandampalai temples.

Viralminda Nayanar is worshipped on Thiruvathira, the Purnima (full moon day) of the Tamil month of Chithirai. He is depicted is depicted wearing a crown, with folded hands (see Anjali mudra) and holding an axe (parashu) in the crook of his arm. He receives collective worship as part of the 63 Nayanars. Their icons and brief accounts of his deeds are found in many Shiva temples in Tamil Nadu. Their images are taken out in procession in festivals.

== See also ==
- Nayanars
