= Sree Narayanapuram Thrikkayil Temple =

Hindu temple in Kerala, India

ശ്രീ നാരായണപുരം തൃക്കയിൽ ക്ഷേത്രം
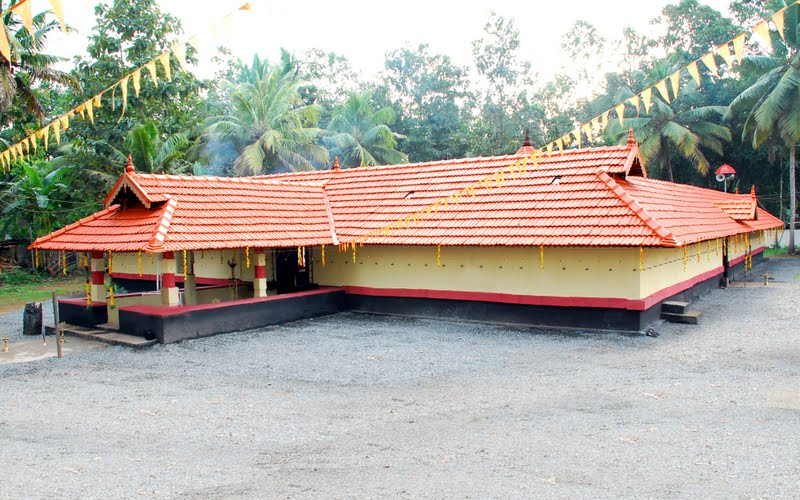

Religion
- Affiliation: Hinduism
- District: Alappuzha
- Deity: Vishnu
- Festival: പന്ത്രണ്ട് വിളക്ക് മഹോത്സവം

Location
- Location: Perissery
- State: Kerala
- Country: India
- Interactive map of ശ്രീ നാരായണപുരം തൃക്കയിൽ ക്ഷേത്രം
- Coordinates: 9.3096°N 76.5994°E

Website
- ശ്രീ നാരായണപുരം തൃക്കയിൽ ക്ഷേത്രം

Sree Narayanapuram Thrikkayil Temple (Malayalam: ശ്രീ നാരായണപുരം തൃക്കയിൽ ക്ഷേത്രം) is one of the oldest temples in Perissery. The divine idol installed here represents the world–enchanting form of Krishna endowed with the four lustrous arms carrying the conch, the discus, the mace, and the lotus. Adorned with the divine Thulasi garland and pearl necklaces, the idol represents the majestic form of Vishnu as revealed to Vasudeva and Devaki at the time of Krishnavatharam.

== Gallery ==
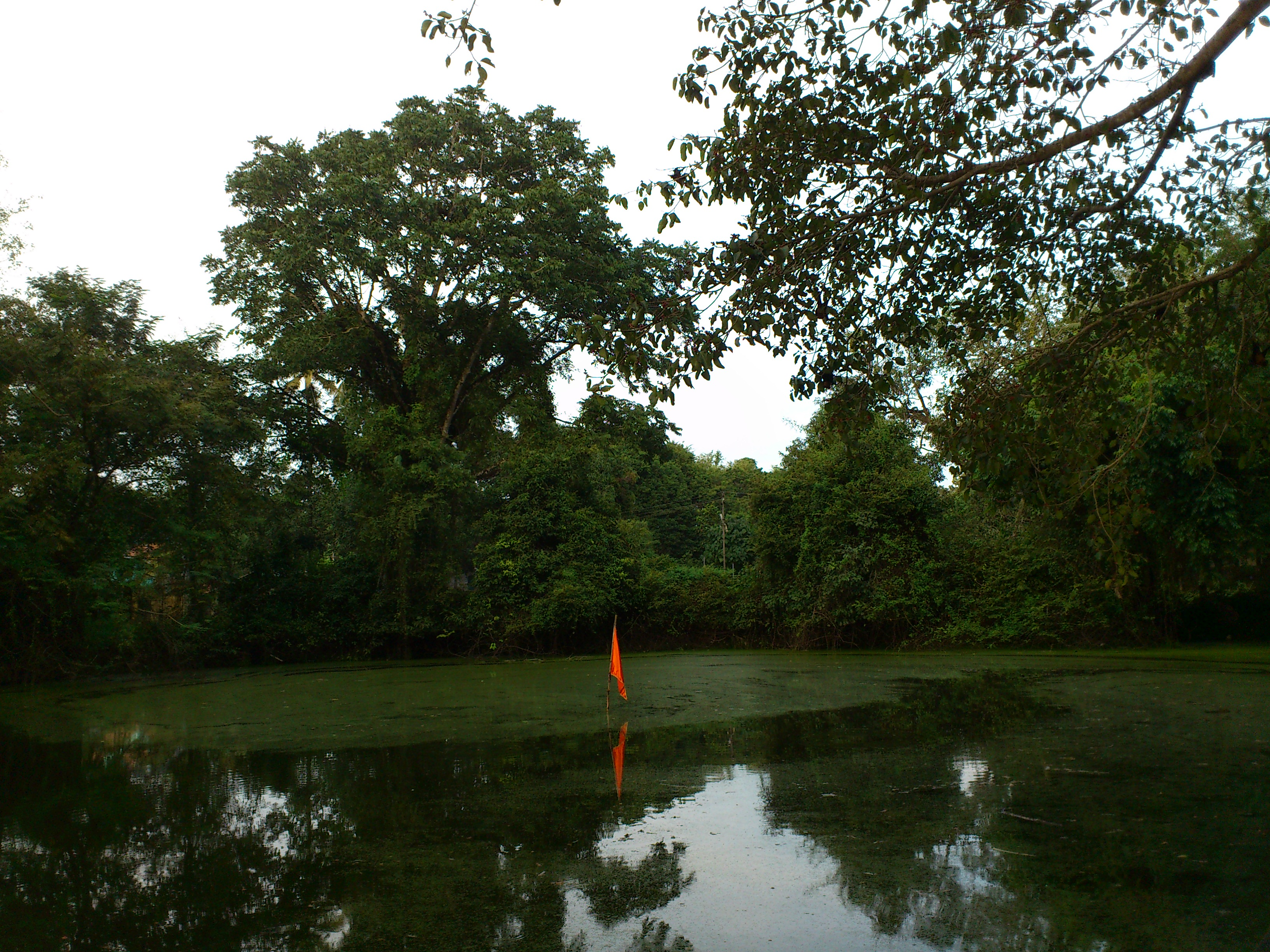
അമ്പലക്കുളം

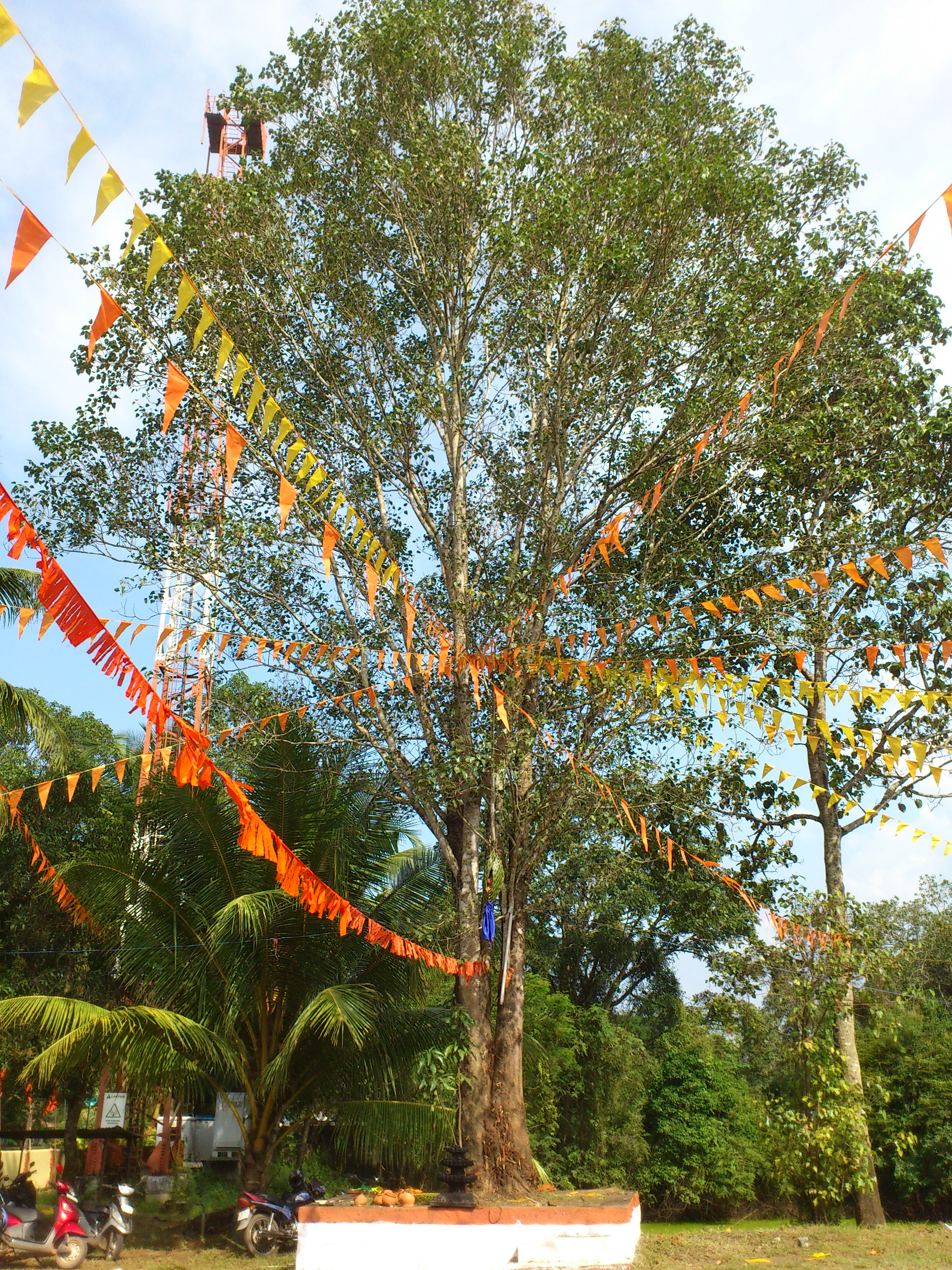
അരയാൽ മരം

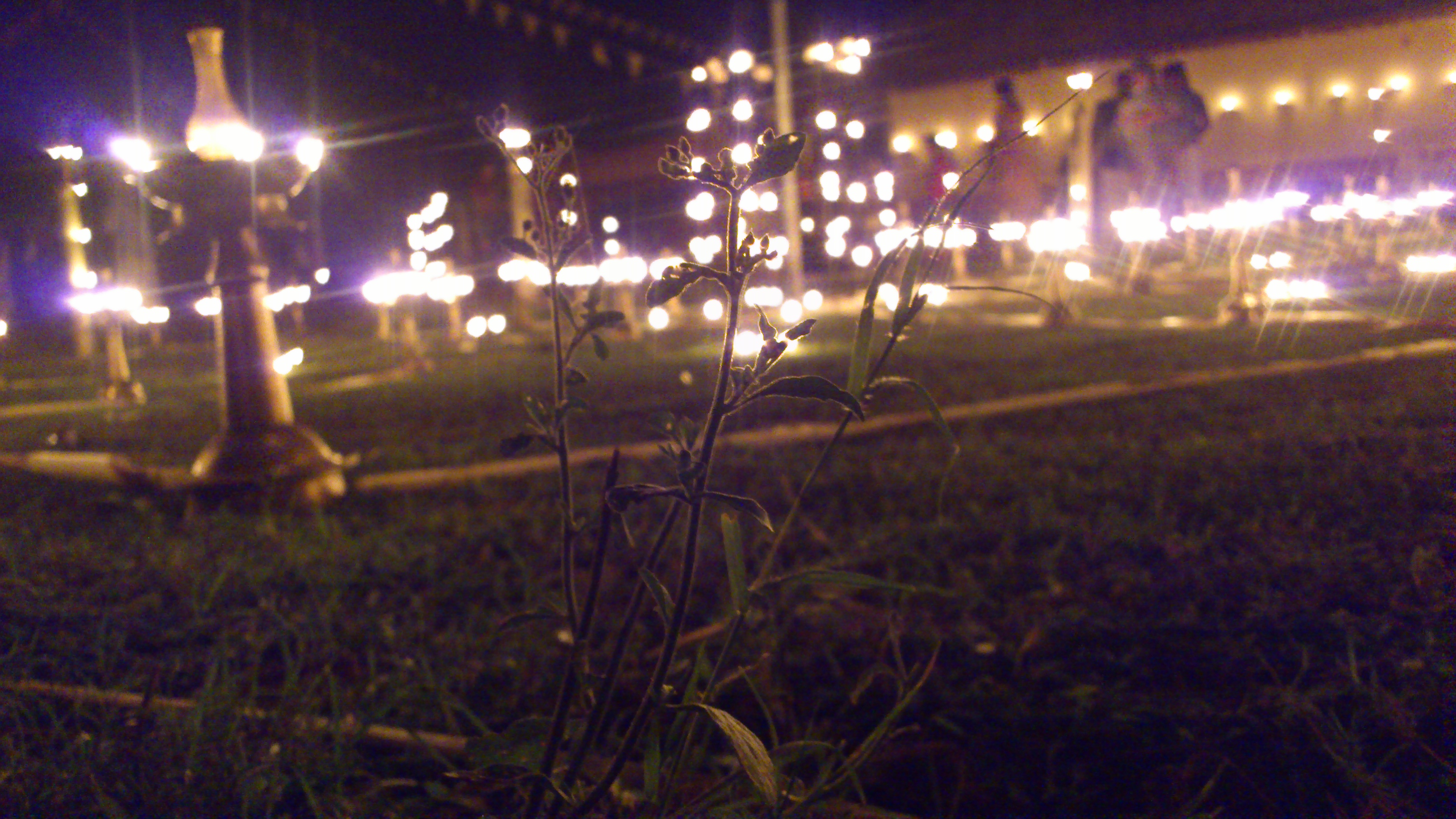
പന്ത്രണ്ട് വിളക്ക് മഹോത്സവം

== See also ==
- Temples of Kerala
- Temple festivals of Kerala
- List of places of worship in Chengannur
