= P. M. Joseph =

Indian educationist

- Born: Puthenpurayil Mathew Joseph; Chengannur, Kerala, India
- Occupation: Educationist
- Known for: Physical education
- Awards: Padma Shri

Puthenpurayil Mathew Joseph was an Indian educationist and the founder principal of the Laxmibai National College of Physical Education which later grew to become the present day, Lakshmibai National University of Physical Education (LNIPE), Gwalior.

== Early life ==
Born in Chengannur, in the south Indian state of Kerala, Joseph was also the founder of the Physical Education Foundation of India, a non governmental organization working towards effective dissemination of scientific knowledge in sports and sports education. LNIPE have named their central library after him.

== Awards ==
He was honoured by the Government of India in 1967, with the award of Padma Shri, the fourth highest Indian civilian award for his contributions to the society.

== See also ==
- Lakshmibai National University of Physical Education
