= Kadampur, Kerala =

Village in Kerala, India

Kadampur is the north west part of Budhanur panchayat, Chengannur Taluk, Alappuzha District, in state of Kerala, India.
