= Sree Ayyappa College, Eramallikkara =

- ശ്രീ അയ്യപ്പ കോളേജ്, ഇരമല്ലിക്കര
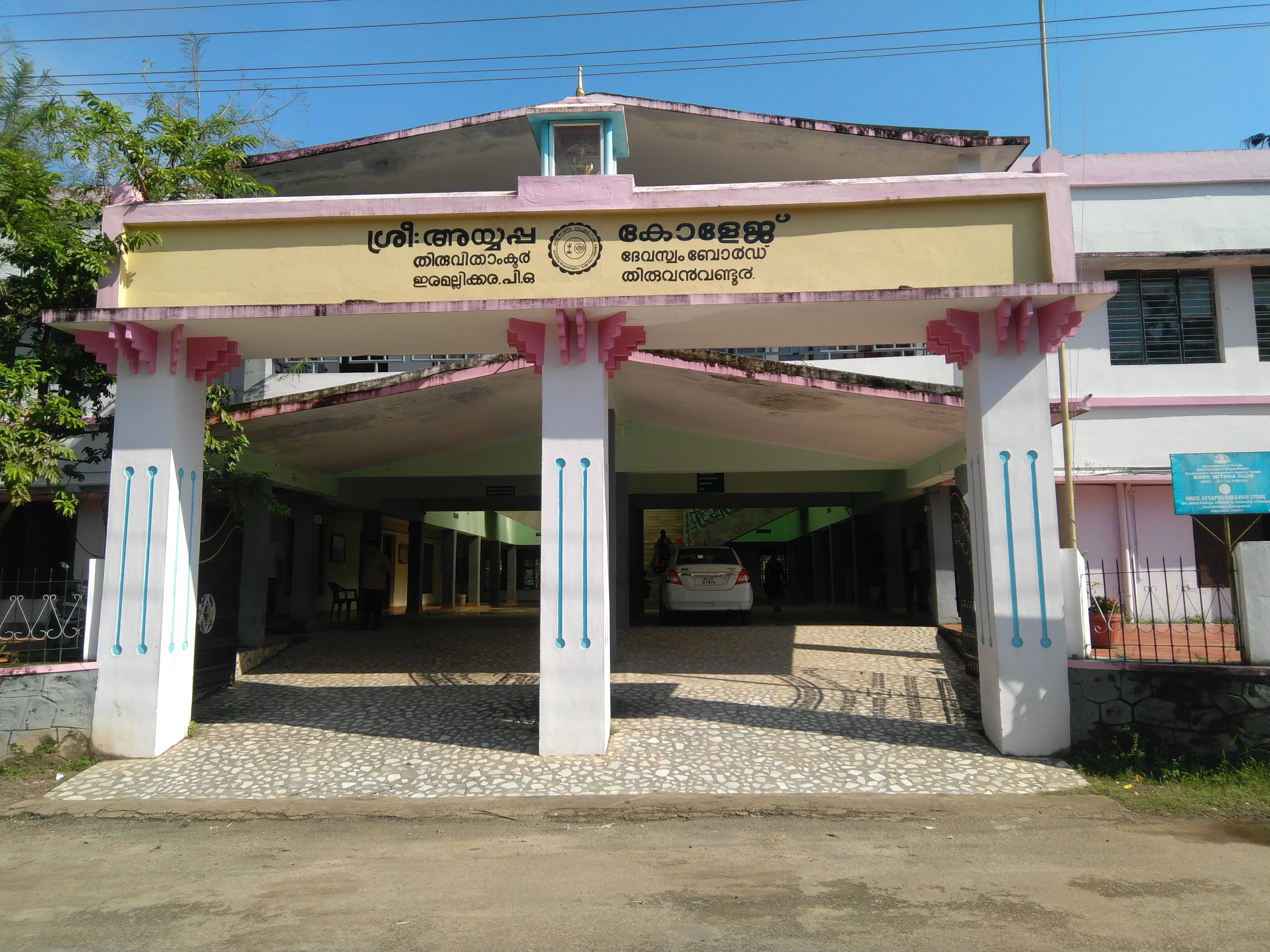
- Type: Public
- Established: 1995
- Affiliations: University of Kerala
- Principal: Dr. K C Prakash
- Location: Chengannur, Kerala, India; 9°20′51.44″N 76°33′22.13″E
- Website: www.sreeayyappacollege.ac.in

Sree Ayyappa College, Eramallikkara is Government aided college of Higher Education located at Eramallikkara, Chengannur, affiliated to University of Kerala. The college is owned and managed by Travancore Devaswom Board. Started functioning in 1995 under colleges included under Section 2(f)/12(B) of UGC Act 1956, as the fulfilment of a long cherished dream of the rustic populace of the serene and beautiful hamlet of Eramallikkara, situated at the confluence of the twin-rivers, holy Pamba River and Manimala.

== Location ==
Sree Ayyappa college is located at Eramallikara, Thiruvanvandoor, which is about 4 km from NH 183. The Chengannur Railway station is the nearest railway station to the college.

== Departments ==
- Commerce with Computer application
- Computer Science
- Electronics
- Industrial Microbiology and Bio chemistry
- Mathematics
- Oriental languages
- Physical Education

== Courses Offered ==
Two year post graduation course in

- M.Sc Computer Science

Under Graduation courses in

- B.Sc Computer Science
- B.Sc Electronics
- B.Sc Mathematics
- B.Sc Biochemistry & Industrial Microbiology
- B.com Commerce with Computer Application
- B.A English and Media Studies

== Accreditation ==
It is a NAAC accredited college.

== Admission ==
Admission to all classes is governed by the rules laid down by the Govt. of Kerala and the University of Kerala from time to time
