= K. M. Cherian (doctor) =

Indian heart surgeon (1942–2025)

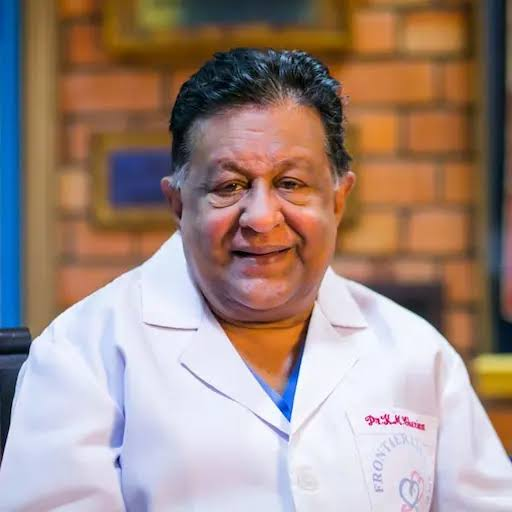
- Born: 8 March 1942; Kayamkulam, Kingdom of Travancore, India
- Died: 25 January 2025 (aged 82); Bengaluru, Karnataka, India
- Education: Kasturba Medical College, Mangalore
- Occupation: Cardiac surgery
- Years active: 50+ years in cardiac surgery
- Known for: Performed India’s first successful coronary artery bypass surgery in 1975
- Spouse: Selien Cherian
- Children: Sanjay Cherian (son) Sandhya Cherian (daughter)
- Awards: Padma Shri in 1991 Wockhardt Medical Excellence Award in 2005 Lifetime Achievement from KMC

Kotturathu Mammen Cherian (8 March 1942 – 25 January 2025) was an Indian heart surgeon. He performed India's first coronary artery bypass surgery and first heart-lung transplant and is considered a pioneer of pediatric cardiac surgery in the country. He was also a former honorary surgeon to the President of India and a Padma Shri awardee.

== Background ==
Cherian was born to Mammen of the Kotturathu house in Chengannur, Kerala, on 8 March 1942. He started his career in Christian Medical College, in Vellore as lecturer in Surgery. In 1970, he migrated to Australia. He did his FRACS in Cardiothoracic Surgery in 1973. He also worked in New Zealand and the United States.

After his studies, he worked as a Special Fellow in Pediatric Cardiac Surgery in Birmingham, Alabama under Dr. John W. Kirklin and in the University of Oregon under Dr. Albert Starr. On his 26th birthday in 1968, he performed his first open heart surgery.

As a young migrant in Australia, he had the opportunity to work at St Vincent's Hospital, Sydney.

Cherian died in Bengaluru, Karnataka on 25 January 2025, at the age of 82. He is survived by his son Sanjay, daughter Sandhya and many grandchildren. His wife Celine predeceased him in 2020.

== Career as surgeon ==
Cherian attended Kasturba Medical College, Manipal. He performed India's first coronary artery bypass surgery in 1975 at Southern Railway Headquarters hospital, Perambur, Chennai. He was the founder of Frontier Lifeline Hospital, where he performed India's second heart transplant surgery in 1995. He also performed the country's first heart-lung transplant and the country's first pediatric cardiac surgery. Dr.K.M.Cherian is also credited with introducing the Physician Assistant profession in India in the year 1992. Today, the profession has grown to over 10,000 graduate PAs with over 25 universities conducting the program. The Indian Association of Physician Assistants celebrates Dr.K.M.Cherian as the father of the PA profession in India.

== Awards and honours ==
- He was awarded Padma Shri by the Government of India in 1991, and was honorary surgeon to the President of India from 1990 to 1993.
- In June 2000, Cherian received a lifetime achievement award from Kasturba Medical College for contributions made to the field of cardiothoracic surgery in India.
- He received a Harvard Medical Excellence Award in 2005, through a panel organised by Harvard Medical School.
- His name is engraved in one of the stones at Kos Island, Greece along with three other Indian surgeons, on the occasion of the 18th World Congress held by the World Society of Cardio Thoracic Surgeons held between 30 April – 3 May 2008.
- In 2010, Cherian became the first Indian to be designated president of the World Society of Cardio Thoracic Surgeons.
- In May 2016, Cherian was selected to be a member of the "Founder Circle" of the American Association for Thoracic Surgery.

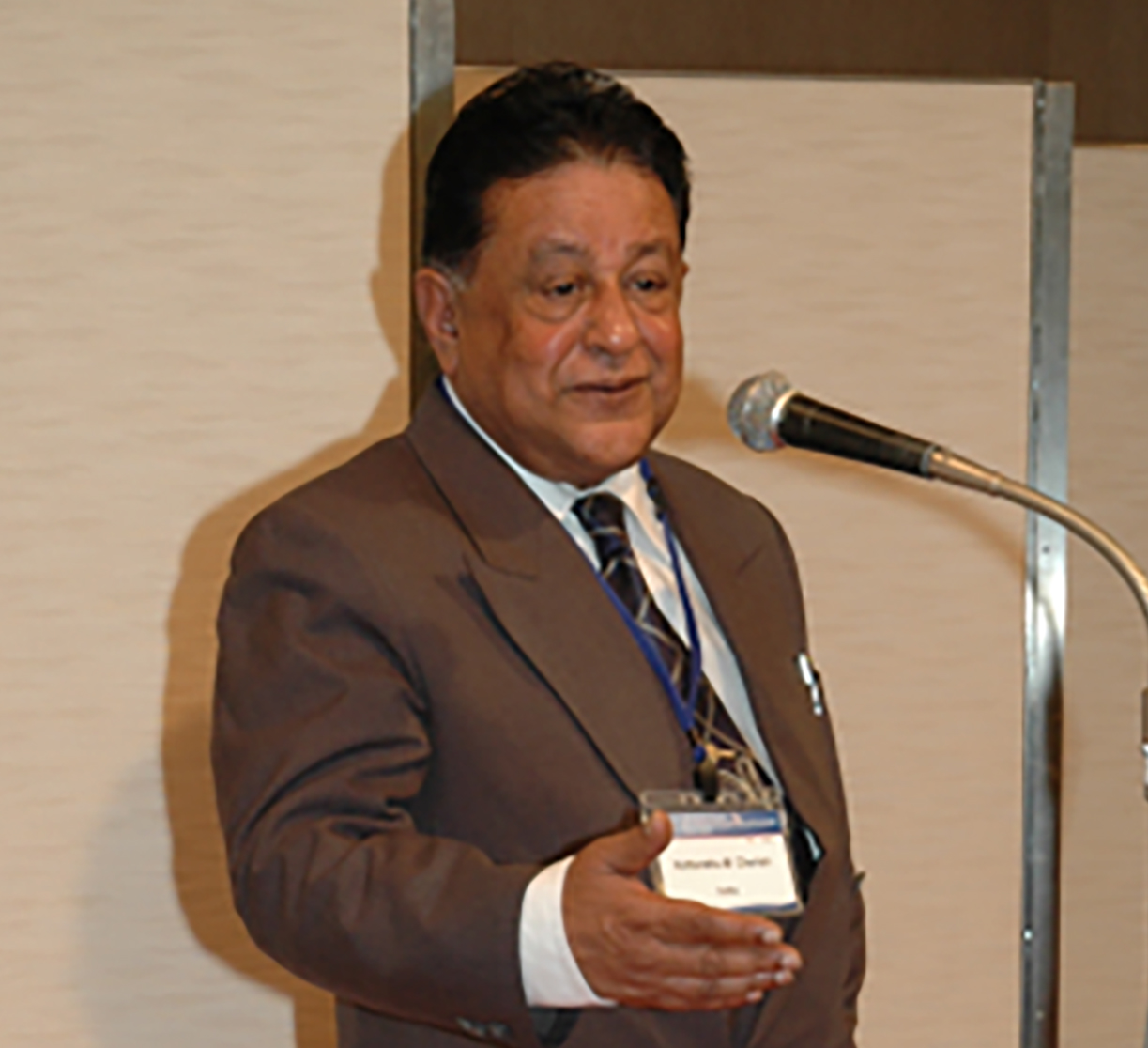
Dr.K.M.Cherian in Kyoto, Japan during the WSCTS Conference, 2007

== Business ventures ==
Cherian was the Founding Vice President and Director of Madras Medical Mission (MMM), Founding Chairman of Pondicherry Institute of Medical Sciences (PIMS). He was the Founder Chairman of Frontier Lifeline Hospital and Frontier Mediville, the first Medical SEZ and Medical Science Park in India. His Charitable Trust has built the St.Gregorios Cardio Vascular Centre, at Parumala, in Kerala and his Educational Trust runs the International CBSE School named “The Study – L’ecole Internationale” in Puducherry.

=== Dr. K. M. Cherian Institute of Medical Sciences ===
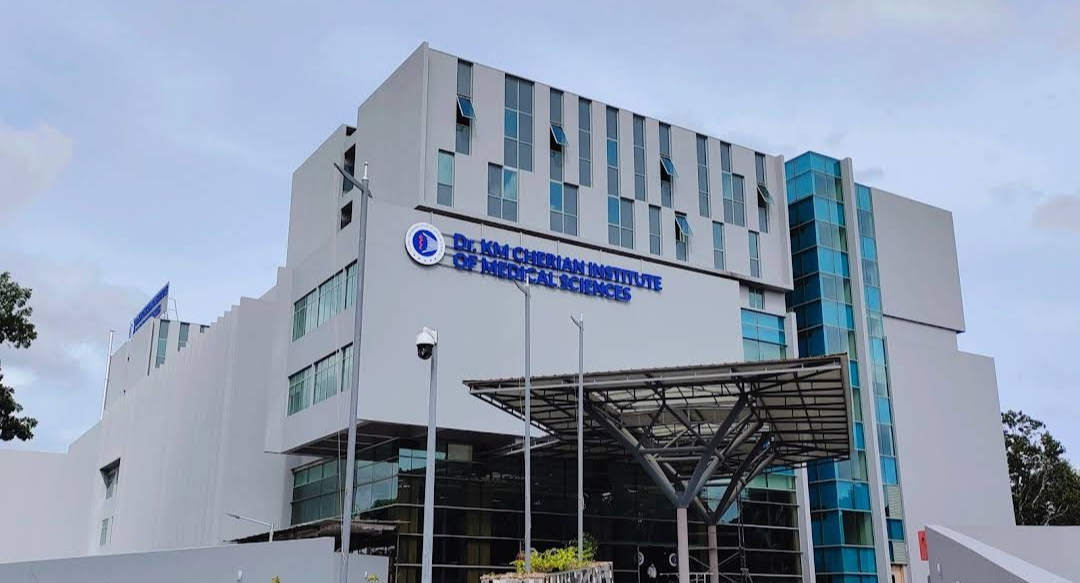
Dr. K. M. Cherian Institute of Medical Sciences.

Cherian and several other investors set up a hospital in Chengannur, Kerala. It was inaugurated in March 2021. It sits on a 5-acre plot. The name of the hospital is Dr. K. M. Cherian institute of medical sciences.

== Biography ==
A biography about Cherian titled Hand of God was released in 2015 and was written by Priya M. Menon. He released his autobiography on 24 January 2025.
