= Christian College, Chengannur =

Government-Aided Private college in Kerala, India

Coordinates: 9°18′23.3″N 76°37′34.0″E

- Motto: Our Utmost For The Highest
- Type: Aided
- Established: 1964
- Founder: Rt. Rev. Dr. Mathews Mar Athanasius Episcopa
- Parent institution: Malankara Mar Thoma Syrian Church
- Affiliations: University of Kerala
- Principal: Prof. Dr. Abraham A
- Manager: Rt. Rev. Dr. Euyakim Mar Coorilos Suffragan Metropolitan
- Location: Chengannur, Alappuzha district, Kerala, 689122, India
- Campus: Semi-urban
- Website: http://www.christiancollege.ac.in

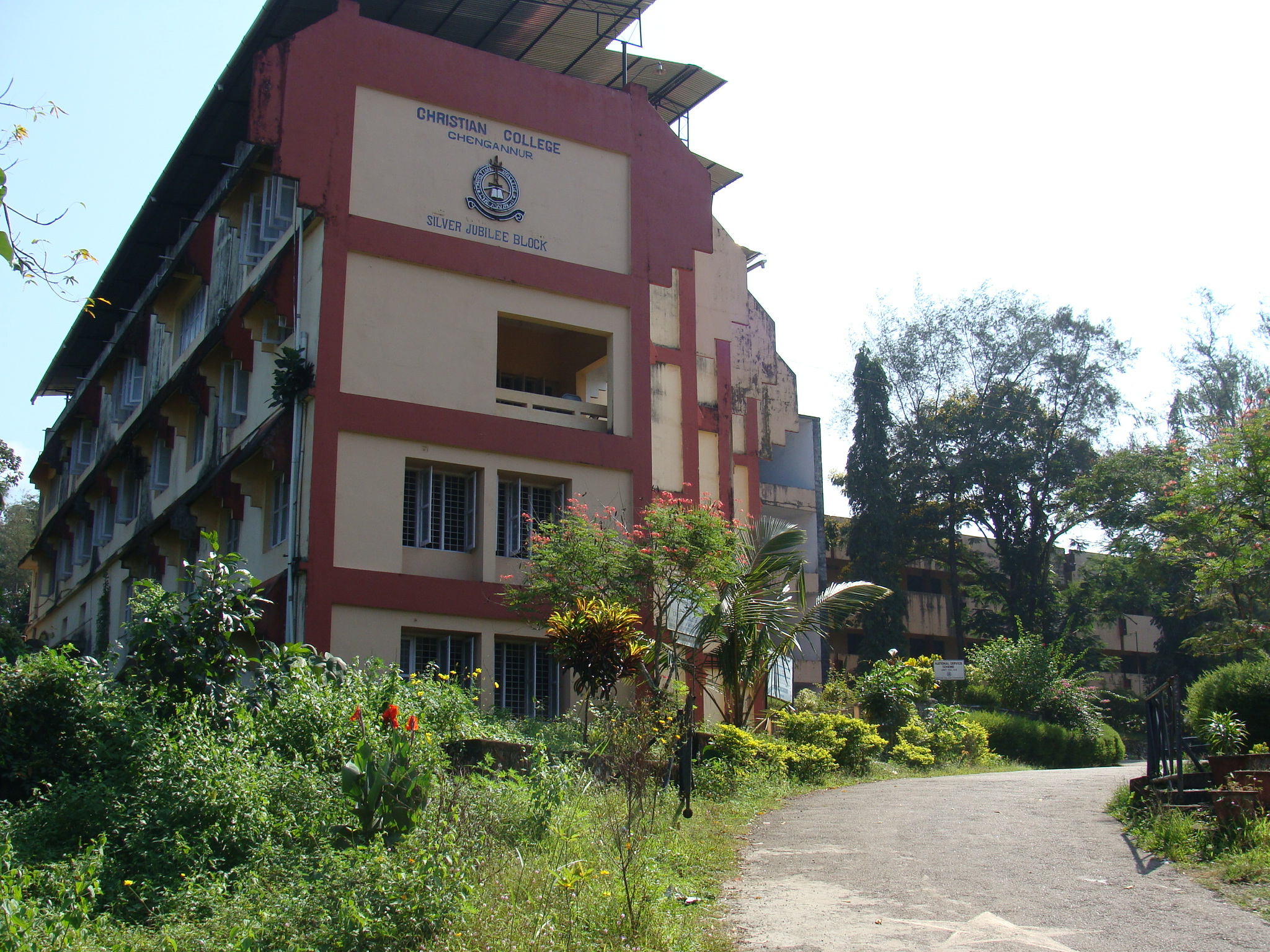
Silver Jubilee Block

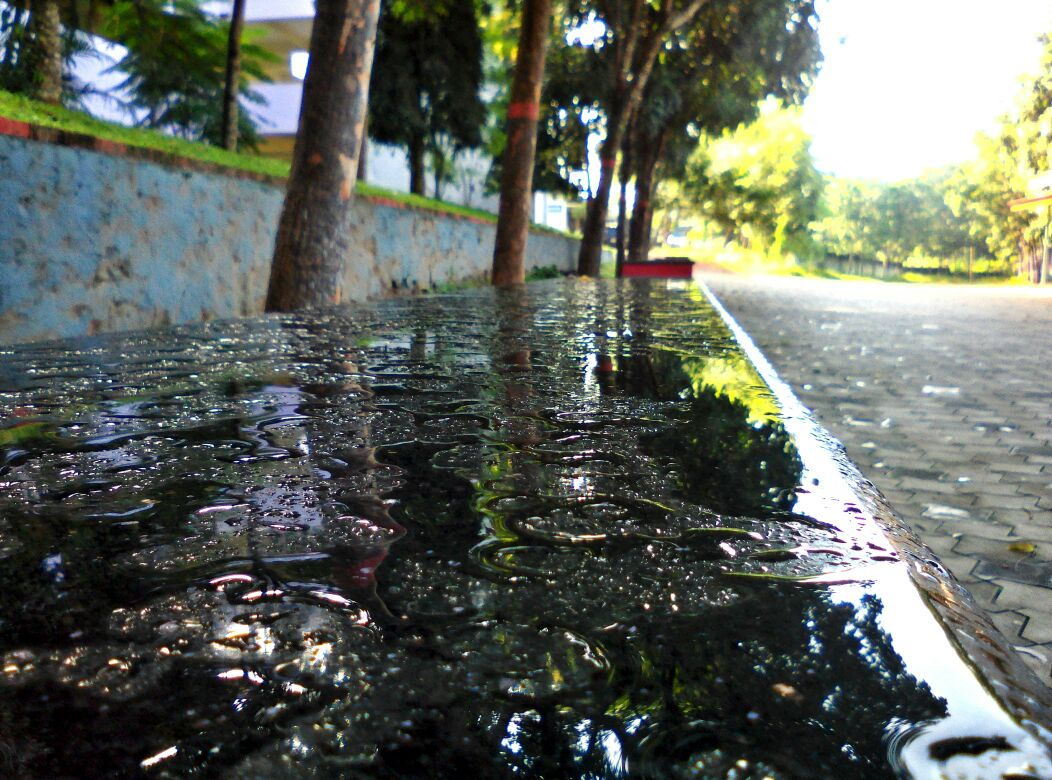
Christian college chengannur

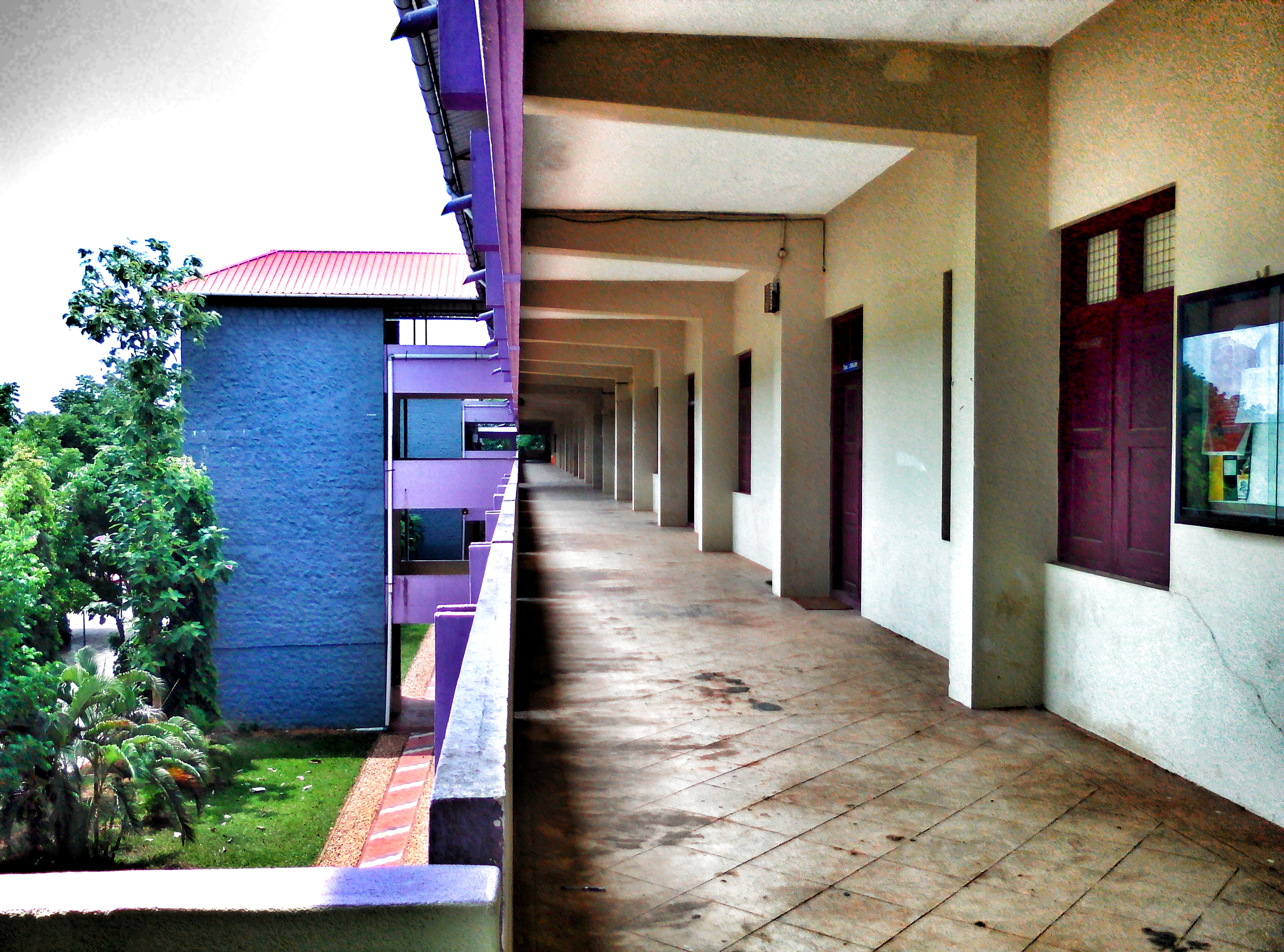
CCC corridors

Christian College, Chengannur (CCC) is a government-aided college for higher education located at Angadickal Chengannur, Alappuzha district, Kerala, India. It was established in 1964 by Rt. Rev. Dr. Mathews Mar Athanasius Episcopa. The college is owned and operated by Malankara Marthoma Syrian Church and affiliated with Kerala University. The NAAC Accredited B++ Grade College has 9 departments offering various graduate and post-graduate courses. Notable alumni of the college include Saji Cherian and former parliamentarian KK Ramachandran Nair.

== Endeavours ==
The College turned a garbage dump into a mini-forest, in an effort for biodiversity conservation. The mini-forest, also known as Shanthisthal, was set up by the Christian College Biodiversity Club, and is home to around 200 trees and plants of 116 species, including several rare, endangered and threatened ones. The College also has the Campus Bird initiative in which birdwatchers and students came together to document the number of birds, to study the changes in regions where such birds exist and how climate change affects the population.

== Awards ==
The college received the Vanamitra Award, instituted by the Kerala Forest Department, on July 2, 2024 for their biodiversity conservation efforts.

== Accreditation ==
The college is recognized by the University Grants Commission (UGC).

== List of Managers ==
(The '^{#}' and '*' indicates the same Bishop(s) known by different titles at different points in time)

1. Rt. Rev. Mathews Mar Athanaseus Episcopa (1964-1973)
2. Rt. Rev. Thomas Mar Athanaseus Suffragan Metropolitan (1974-1980)
3. Rt. Rev. Philipose Mar Chrysostom Suffragan Metropolitan (1980-1984) (1988-1990) (1997-1999)
4. The Most Rev. Dr. Alexander Mar Thoma Metropolitan (1984-1985)
5. Rt. Rev. Easow Mar Timotheos Episcopa (1985-1987)
6. Rt. Rev. Dr. Euyakim Mar Coorilos Episcopa (1990-1997)*
7. Rt. Rev. Dr. Joseph Mar Irenaeus Suffragan Metropolitan (1999-2005)^{#}
8. Rt. Rev. Dr. Zacharias Mar Theophilus Suffragan Metropolitan (2005-2015)
9. Rt. Rev. Dr. Joseph Mar Thoma Metropolitan (2015-2020)^{#}
10. Rt. Rev. Thomas Mar Timotheos Episcopa (2020-2023)
11. Rt. Rev. Dr. Euyakim Mar Coorilos Suffragan Metropolitan (2023-)*

== List of Principals ==
1. Very Rev. A. A. Pylee (1964-1978)
2. Prof. K. M. Thomas (1978-1984)
3. Prof. N. P. Philip (1984-1989)
4. Prof. George Varghese (1989-1994)
5. Prof. K. V. Mathew (1994-1997)
6. Dr. George Zachariah (1997-1999)
7. Prof. Dr. T. C. Varghese (1999-2002)
8. Prof. Mathew C. Philip (2002-2007)
9. Dr. Jacob George (2007-2012)
10. Prof. Mathew Varghese (2012-2014)
11. Dr. Achamma Alex (2014-2019)
12. Dr. Johnson Baby (2019-2024)
13. Prof. Dr. Abraham A (2024-)
