= Old Syrian Church, Chengannur =

Syrian Christian church in Kerala, India

Coordinates: 9.322683°N 76.605567°E

Pazhaya Suriyani Pally a.k.a. Old Syrian Church, Chengannur is an ancient Syrian Christian church of Kerala. It is governed by a joint commission of the Malankara Orthodox Syrian Church and the Mar Thoma Syrian Church. It is considered as one among the oldest still standing church buildings in Kerala and across India, that predates several centuries before the arrival of European Christianity in India. It is located at Chengannur, a major town along the MC Road, about 117 km north of the Kerala state capital Thiruvananthapuram and about 98 km south of Kochi. According to the verdict by the Madras High Court the governance of the church is conducted by both denominations who appoint trustees for the maintenance of the building.

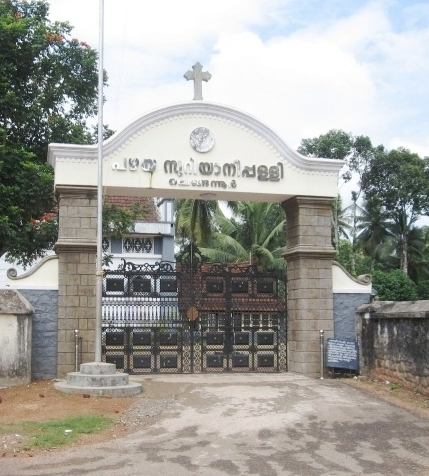

== History ==
It is believed that the church was built about 1650 years ago. The structure of the church building indicates that it is old. The story is that long ago a hermit priest came to Chengannur and began a worship place at this spot.

Till AD 1580, Nazranis and Knanaya people were worshipping together in this church. Then the Knanaya people who escaped the persecution in Cochin and surrounding area, also joined with those at Chengannur. Later the Knanaya people had built their own church and moved out. During reformation two groups were formed in the Malankara Church. These two factions quarreled in this church and there was a court case. Now the Chengannur Pazhaya Pally is co-owned by the Malankara Orthodox Syrian Church and the Malankara Mar Thoma Syrian Church.

== Architecture ==
Architectural style is a blend of 18th Century Christian and Hindu temple architecture and something fast disappearing from Kerala landscape. Its gopuravathil (gatetower), nadapanthal (porch), kalluvilakku (stone lamp) and doors are adorned with carved figurines, including a depiction of Hanuman holding a baton. This is indicative of communal and religious harmony exhibited by the localities in yesteryears.

The Pazhaya Suriyani Pally in Chengannur and the Cheriya Pally (St. Mary's Orthodox Church) in Kottayam have a similar architectural style.

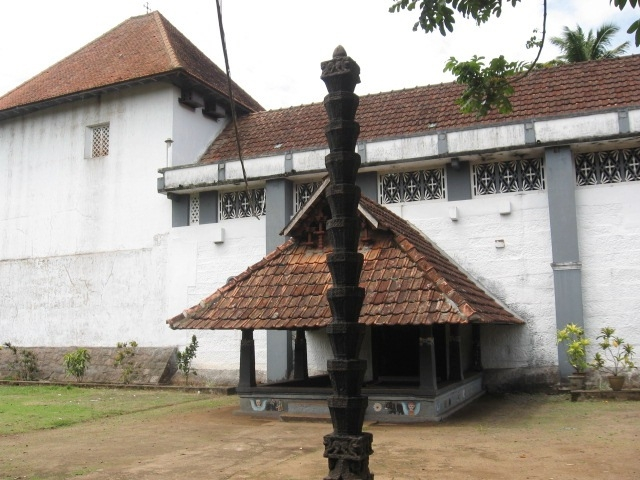

== History ==
History has it that Ivanios Yuhanon, a metropolitan from Antioch, Syria, visited Malankara in 1751 and made the western malika (double storied building) of the Pazhya Suriyani Pally (this malika is no more there) his home. Mar Ivanios, credited with the propagation the liturgy of Mar Yacob in Malankara, died in 1794 and was interred in front of the southern thronos (altar) of the Church.

There is legend regarding Mar Ivanios’ arrival in Chengannur. When he reached Erapuzha Kadavu on River Pampa by boat, his followers took him to the Church in a procession. But the Nair chiefs of the land did not allow the procession to pass in front of the Vanchipuzha Chief's palace and the procession had to take a different route. When the son of Vanjipuzha Chief fell ill, the royal astrologer found that the curse of a saint had fallen on the son. The Chief is said to have tendered an apology to Mar Ivanios whose prayer rid the boy of his illness. In return the Chief bestowed tax-free land and properties to the Church.

Tablets of History: The cemetery adjoining the Suriyani Pally has over 1200 tombs. George Joseph, who was once President of the Indian National Congress and his brother journalist Pothen Joseph and Padmashri PM Joseph, once principal of the National Physical Education College, Gwalior, are among those buried here.

Suriyani Pally has little written evidence of its past except the words carved on the pillars of its nadapanthal. Its traditions tell of resistance to outside control, both from the East and the West. Throughout the centuries the church proclaimed its independence as evidenced by the formation of a Trust ratified by Travancore Royal, Court and latest by the High Court of Kerala

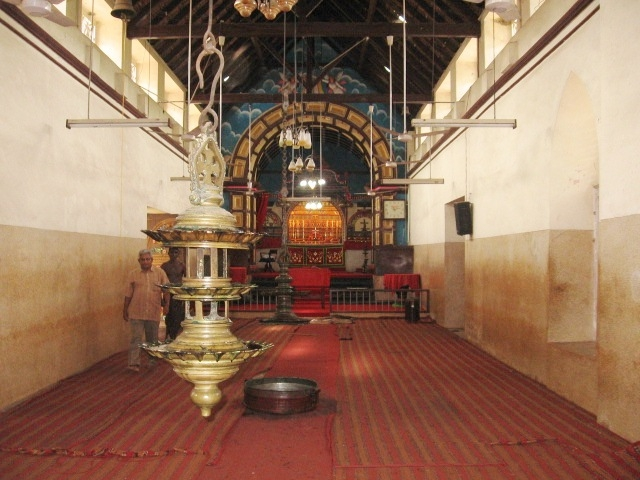

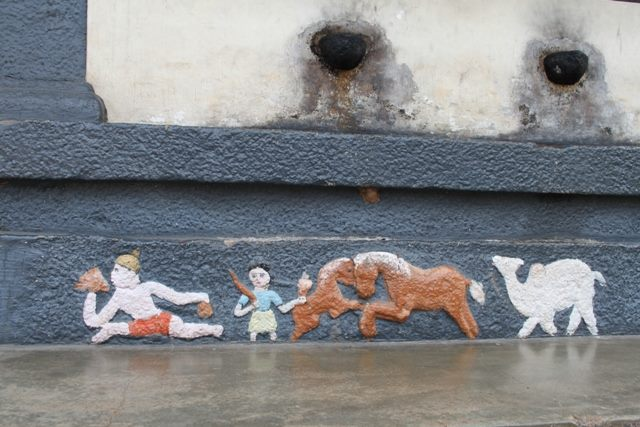
Hanuman picture near chengannur Pazhaya Suriyani Pally

Two tombs close to the Church belong to two members of the Marthoma Church—Kottooreth Valiachan and Kottarathil Thoma Kaseesa. Valiachan, Rev. M. Joseph Kottooreth, was the first translator of the Syrian liturgy and first Secretary of the Church. He was also the first editor of the Malankara Sabha Tharaka. He also successfully conducted the Suriyani Pally case. Thoma Kaseesa and 11 others founded the Marthoma Suvishesha Sangham, which has been organizing the Maramon Convention for more than a century.

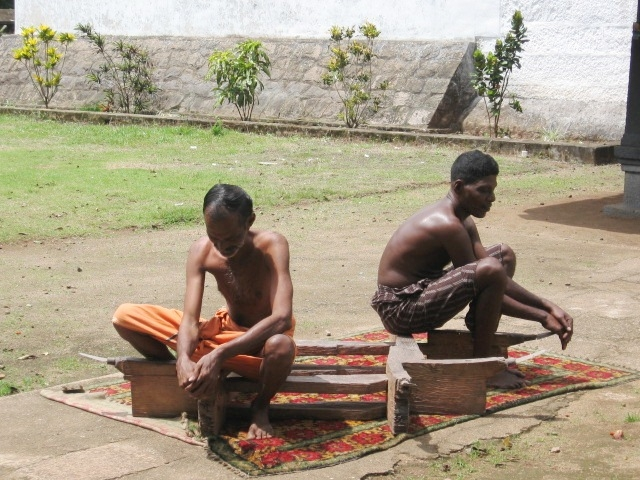

== Traditions ==
The Church is known for its Aval Nercha (offering of sweetened rice flakes) held on every Maundy Thursday, for the last four centuries. The current Trustee, V.A.Abraham Vaikkathethu, is one of the chief organisers of the Nercha at present.

The aval nercha custom is said to have an uninterrupted history of not less than 400 years. It was the patronage of the then rural chieftain of Vanjippuzha Palace, attached to the erstwhile kingdom of Venad who ruled Chengannur in the 16th century, which made it a popular event in the region.

The Vanjippuzha chief had given the power of local administration to Thomman Thomman, founder of the Mukkathu family of Syrian Christians, who had migrated to Chengannur in the late 16th century.

=== Origins of the custom ===
According to church trustee V.A. Abraham, the origin of the aval nercha is attributed to an elderly matriarch of the Mukkathu family named Ackamma who used to take a small packet of aval to distribute it to the devotees after the Holy Qurbana on Maundy Thursday.

Ackamma used to give a pinch of rice flakes to all around her, and the members of the Mukkathu family continued the practice even after her death. The aval nercha became an elaborate event in later years, says Babu Zacharia, a former English professor and former president of the Mukkathu Kudumbayogam.

It is believed that a unique eight-headed coconut-scraper was gifted to the church by the royal chief for the annual aval nercha. There are others who believe that the foldable eight-headed coconut scraper is as old as the 1,650-year-old church. This antique piece is a major attraction of the aval nercha.

More than a thousand coconuts, 300 kg of rice flakes, 200 kg of jaggery, and spices go into the preparation of the aval, says Zacharia.

In the olden days, all these items were collected from the members of the Mukkathu family. However, now, rice flakes, jaggery and spices are purchased from the market, while the coconuts are collected from family members.

=== Collective effort ===
As many as 100 family members assemble on the church premises on the eve of Maundy Thursday, immediately after the evening service. The eldest member of the family present breaks a coconut after a short prayer, marking the beginning of the collective preparation of the aval.

The sweetened aval is kept to soak and swell in large bell metal vessels. It is distributed immediately after the morning service.

The faithful here still follow the custom and tradition of accepting the aval nercha in a cloth and not in a container of any kind, says Abraham.

Services in the church are conducted on a 2-week basis between the Orthodox and Marthoma factions based on pre-determined agreements.
