= Thazhamon Madom =

Family of the tantris of Sabarimala

Thazhamon Madom is the family of the tantris of Sabarimala. The members of this madom are the head priests of Sabarimala temple for many years. This madom is in Mundencavu in Chengannur of central Kerala. The Padi Pooja, Udayasthamana Pooja and Kalasa Poojas cannot be conducted unless the Tantri is present during the ceremony. The tantri, or his representative is required to be present at the temple premises whenever the temple is open.

== Origin ==
They were invited by the Pandalam kings from Andhra Pradesh to serve as Thantris at Sabarimala after the Mala Araya community, who were the traditional priests of Sabarimala, and the Malayali Namboothiri illams declined to take up the thantram due to the temple's location deep within dense forests. The Namboothiris also considered performing the thantram to be inferior, as they identified themselves as Vedic Brahmins, lacked the mantras and ritual frameworks required for the worship of Kerala Tantric deities, and feared that adopting or altering the deity's nature to fit their worship system could bring destruction upon their families.
