= Mampalli copper plate =

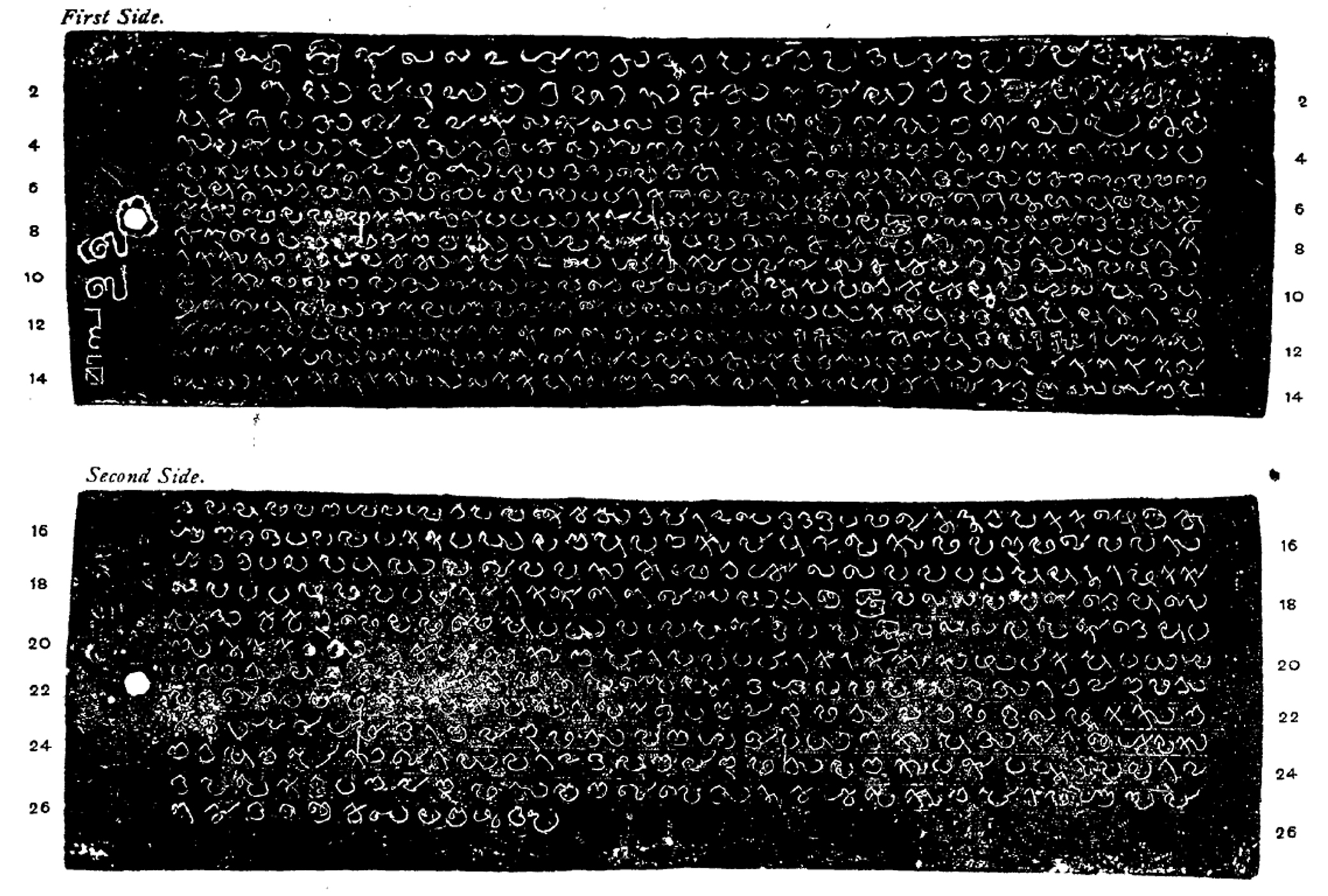
Mampalli copper plate (10th century AD)

The Mampalli copper plate (973 AD), also romanised as Mamballi, records a donation made by the chiefly family of Venad (in present-day Kollam, Kerala) to the Chengannur Temple (Alappuzha, Kerala). The inscription is the earliest epigraphical record to mention the Kollam or Malayalam Era, referring to it as the "Kollam Thonri Era" (year 149).

The record is engraved on both sides of a single copper plate in Vattezhuthu (script), with the necessary Grantha characters, and is written in an early form of the Malayalam language. The plate was originally in the possession of Mampalli Madhom near Trivandrum and is now preserved in the Padmanabhapuram Palace Museum.

A second Mampalli plate, regarded as a companion to the first and dated to approximately the same period, is owned by Mampalli Madhom.

== Contents ==
The Mampalli record is notable for containing two royal deeds issued by the chiefly family of Venad.

=== First deed (as an attipperu) ===
At a meeting held at the Panainkavil Palace in Kollam between Srivallabha Goda, the ruler of Venad, and the committee of Brahmin village elders (the Parada) of Chengannur, the ruler granted to Aditya Umayamma, as a royal gift, the sole proprietary rights over the deity of the Ayirur Temple, which she had originally founded, together with the landed property of the Ayirur Temple.

=== Second deed (as a kizhidu) ===
The second deed records the subordination of the Ayirur Temple to the Chengannur Temple.

Umayamma, in turn, donated to the Chengannur Temple, as a subordinate property endowment (kizhidu), the proprietary rights and landed property of the Ayirur Temple that she had received as a royal gift, with Srivallabha Goda, the village assembly, and others serving as witnesses. The endowment included provisions for routine expenditures and for the payment of a protection fee (rakshabhoga).

The uralar were responsible for protecting the temple and its property and were entitled to receive 200 para of paddy annually as the protection fee (rakshabhoga). A penalty clause was also prescribed: anyone who violated the agreement by obstructing cultivation or confiscating property belonging to the kizhidu, together with their accomplices, was required to pay a fine of 200 kazhanju (a unit of measure) of gold.

=== Witnesses to the transaction ===
The following individuals are listed as witnesses:

- Murunkayur Devan Pavithran
- Itayamanam Channaran Kandan
- Manalmukku Kandan Damodaran
- Punalur Ravi Parantavan
- Kutakottur Parantavan Kandan

Scribe: Chathan Chadayan, the village assembly secretary (poduval) of Chengannur.
