= Chengannur =

Municipal town in Kerala, India

- Municipality
- Location within Kerala Location within India
- Coordinates: 9°19′6.54″N 76°36′50.46″E
- Country: India
- State: Kerala
- District: Alappuzha

Government
  - Type: Municipality

Area
  - Total: 14.60 km^{2} (5.64 sq mi)
- Elevation: 7 m (23 ft)

Population (2011)
  - Total: 23,466
  - Density: 1,607/km^{2} (4,163/sq mi)
- Time zone: UTC+5.30 (IST)
- Post code: 689121
- Area code: 0479
- Vehicle Code: KL-30
- Nearest cities: Pathanamthitta (25 km), Kottayam (36 km), Alappuzha (43 km), Kollam (58 km)
- Website: www.chengannurmunicipality.in

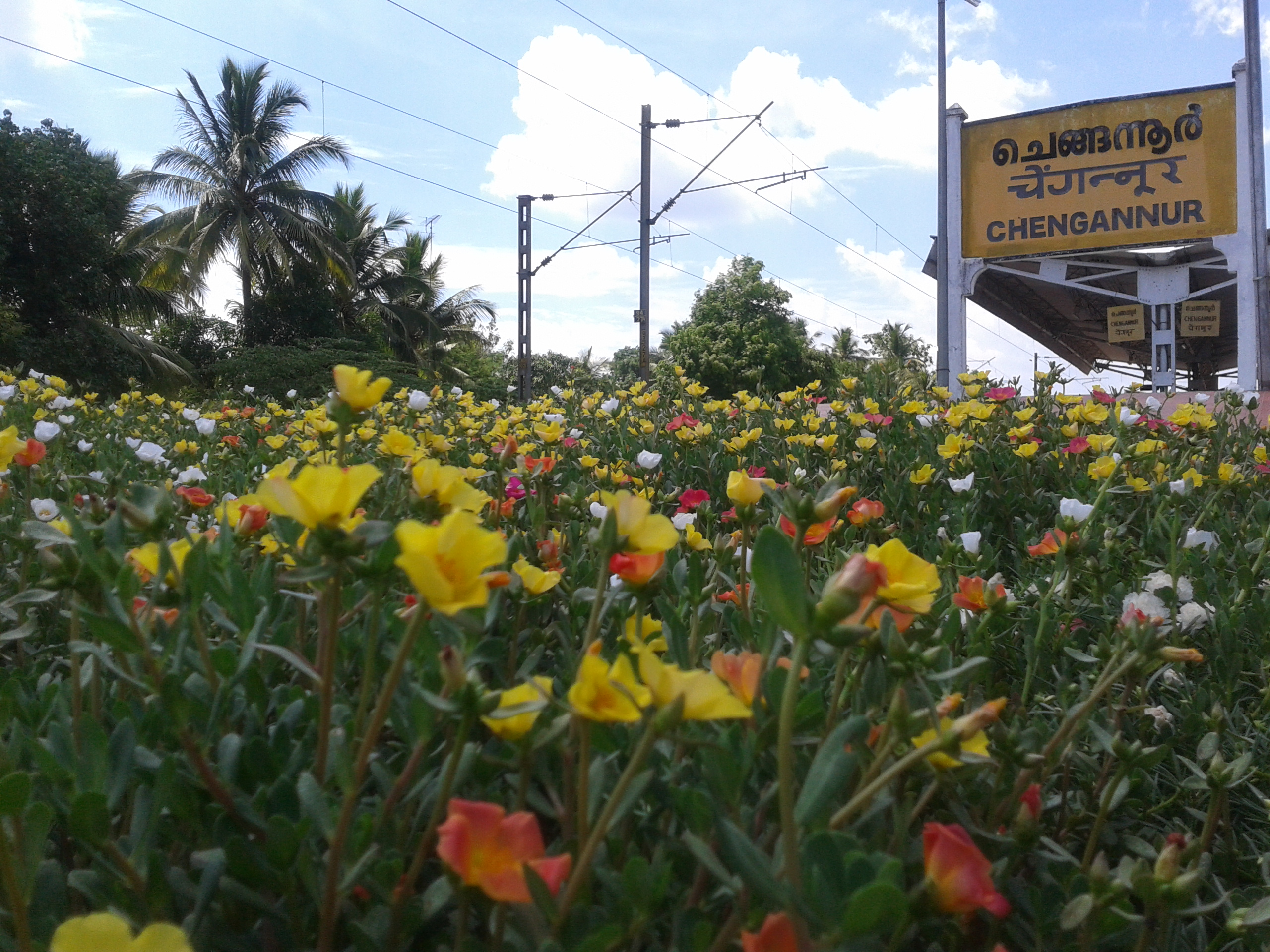
Chengannur Railway Station

Chengannur (IPA: [t͡ʃeŋ:e̞n:u:r]) is a municipality in the Alappuzha district of Kerala, India. It is located 43 km (26.7 mi) southeast of the district headquarters in Alappuzha and about 117 km (72.7 mi) north of the state capital Thiruvananthapuram. Although Chengannur is part of Alappuzha district, it lies closer to the other district headquarters, Pathanamthitta, about 24 km (15 mi) to its northwest. As per the 2011 Indian census, Chengannur has a population of 23,466 people and a population density of 1,607/km^{2} (4,160/sq mi).

Today, Chengannur is a primary economic and cultural hub of the Onattukara region. The town is noted for the Chengannur Mahadeva Temple and the Old Syrian Church of the ancient St. Thomas Christians community. It is also a major point for pilgrims to the Sabarimala Temple, and thus has been described as "The Gateway to Sabarimala".

== Etymology ==
The name Chengannur (chem-kunnu-ur/oor) is derived from the words 'chem' (Malayalam), which means 'red'; 'kunnu' (Malayalam), which means 'hill'; and 'ur/oor' (Malayalam), which means 'land.' It means the land of red hills. The red soil of Chengannur was different from the soil of nearby regions of Mavelikara and Kuttanad.

== History ==
=== Ancient Period ===
Chengannur was a part of the Ay Kingdom in the ancient period. The Ay Kingdom's territory extended from the Pamba River in the north to Nagercoil in the south. Thereafter it came under the sovereignty of the Cheraman Perumals. The earliest epigraphical record to mention Chengannur (Thiruchenkunrur) is the Mampalli copper plate inscription (947 CE), which records a donation from Venad chiefly family to the Chengannur Temple.

=== Medieval Period ===
In the medieval age, Chengannur was controlled by the Vanjipuzha chieftains of Mundencavu, of Tulu Brahmin origin. The principality was a feudatory of Odanad. Chengannur came under the Kingdom of Travancore when the area was annexed by Marthanda Varma in 1742. Marthanda Varma transferred the rights over Chengannur from the King of Odanad to the Vanjipuzha family, after the family helped him in his conquests. The economic, social, and religious esteem and the political power and sway of the Vanjipuzha family over Chengannur continued to be intact throughout the British period uninterrupted.

In the mid-18th century, there were large-scale migrations from Kollam due to various natural disasters. Black pepper was a major export item of Chengannur. Angadikkal (Angadi means market in Malayalam) was the main market in Chengannur. The current Chengannur market, known as Shastham Puram Chanda, was developed by Velu Thampi Dalawa. During the 19th and 20th centuries, this market played a major role in selling and buying goods produced in the eastern mountains with the towns along the coast.

=== Early Modern Period ===
Mahatma Gandhi addressed at the Mills Ground (Mills Maithan is Ksrtc Bus stand now) at Chengannur in 1925 as part of his visit to the Kingdom of Travancore. In 1938, as part of the Indian independence movement, a large gathering of people from all over Central Travancore were present at the Mills Maithan in Chengannur in response to a notification circulated by the State Congress. There was a police lathi charge during the meeting, and a person named 'Kutilil George' died, and scores of people were injured.

Chengannur Municipality was formed in the year 1980 with Shri. P.K. John Plammoottil as its first municipal chairman.

== Culture ==
The cultural background of Chengannur originates from the era of royal rule. Chengannur was a part of Vanjippuzha Principality, which was under the rule of Travancore.

Chengannur town is in the banks of the holy river Pamba which influenced the culture of this town. There are many "Chundan Vallam" (snake boats) participating in the Aranmula Boat Race hails from Chengannur and nearby areas. Padayani is a traditional temple artform performed as part of the festival in the Vadasserikkavu Devi Temple. Chengannur has produced several great Kathakali artists, the most famous being Chenganoor Raman Pillai. Chengannur was also historically famous for the craftsmen who were brought by rulers of Travancore to build the Sabarimala temple. Idols of the deities of many temples in Kerala were crafted in Chengannur.

Chengannur is a major Shaiva pilgrim destination in India. The Chengannur temple is one of the 108 temples believed to have been created by Parasurama. The Vishnu temples of Chengannur are believed to have been established by the Pandavas of the Mahabharatha. These temples are major Vaishnava pilgrim destinations of South India.

The Chengannur Suriyani Church, built by the Vanjipuzha Chiefs, is well-known for its unique architecture. The Church is shared by both the Marthoma and Orthodox Christians. There is a 33.5 feet tall cross said to have been carved from a single stone is a minor attraction. The annual custom of Aval Nercha (offering of flattened rice) at this church is another tradition believed to have been initiated by a member nearly 400 years ago. This custom is still practiced by the local Nasrani community and is organised by members of the Mukkath Kudumba Yogam on Maundy Thursday.

== Demographics ==
Historical population
Year	Pop.	±%
1931	10,738	—
1941	12,543	+16.8%
1951	14,561	+16.1%
1961	22,277	+53.0%
1971	13,316	−40.2%
1981	24,862	+86.7%
1991	25,872	+4.1%
2001	25,397	−1.8%
2011	23,466	−7.6%

As of the 2011 Census, Chengannur had a population of 23,466 and a population density of 1,607 inhabitants per square kilometre (4,160/sq mi). Of this, 10,933 are males and 12,533 are females. Chengannur Municipality has an area of 14.6 km^{2} (5.6 sq mi) with 6,278 families residing in it. The average female sex ratio was 1146 higher than the state average of 1084. 7.2% of the population was under 6 years of age. Chengannur had an average literacy of 97.8%, higher than the state average of 94%; male literacy was 98.3% and female literacy was 97.4%.

=== Religion ===
Religion in Chengannur (2011)
1. Hinduism (61.7%)
2. Christianity (37.3%)
3. Islam (0.43%)
4. None (0.56%)
5. Other (0.04%)

According to the 2011 census, Hindus are the majority, with 62% of the population adhering to the religion. Christians form a significant minority, constituting 37% of the population. Muslims constitute 0.56% of the population.

Chengannur town is the headquarters of the Chengannur Orthodox Diocese under the Malankara Orthodox Syrian Church. The diocese is headquartered at Bethel Aramana, Chengannur, and covers 51 parishes and 10 chapels in the Chengannur area. The diocesan cathedral is Saint Ignatius Orthodox Cathedral in Chengannur, the spiritual center of 8,851 Malankara Orthodox families.

== Transport ==
Chengannur is well-connected by road and rail. State Highway 1 (SH1), popularly known as the MC Road, passes through the heart of the town and connects Chengannur to the state capital, Thiruvananthapuram and Angamaly in Eranakulam District. The Chengannur - Kottayam stretch of the MC Road is also part of the NH 183, which stretches between Kollam and Theni. Another major road is State Highway 10 which connects Chengannur to Mavelikkara and Kozhencherry. Besides these two roads, there are also many arterial roads running across the length and breadth of the town.

=== Road ===
Kerala State Road Transport Corporation has a depot at Chengannur (station code: CGNR); it is among the 29 major depots in the state. The KSRTC depot at Chengannur has an interstate bus service, which is operated to Kanyakumari. KSRTC runs buses to different cities and towns inside and outside the state. Some of the major destinations are Thiruvananthapuram, Ernakulam, Thrissur, Kozhikode, Mangalore, Mukambika, Kanyakumari, Coimbatore, Palani, Kannur and Wayanad. The municipal private bus stand is located in front of the railway station. Private buses leave this stand heading to various places in the Alappuzha, Kottayam, Pathanamthitta and Kollam districts. In addition to these, private luxury buses are available to major cities like Bangalore, Chennai, Coimbatore, Mysore, Salem, Mangalore etc.

=== Rail ===
Chengannur Railway Station (station code: CNGR) is an important railway station between Kollam and Kottayam. It is a major railway station in the Thiruvananthapuram railway division of the Southern Railway Zone (India). People from the eastern part of the state are using this railway station for travelling to various parts of the country. All the trains travelling through this route stop at Chengannur station. It caters to the needs of 3 districts, viz., Alappuzha, Kollam and Pathanamthitta. By rail, Chengannur is well connected to major cities in India like Delhi, Mumbai, Chennai, Kolkata, Bangalore, Hyderabad, Pune, Agra, Ahmedabad, Bikaner, Mangalore, Bhopal, Guwahati, Nagpur, Jammu and other major cities of the country. Recently, the station has been declared as "The Gateway to Sabarimala". The rail line between Chengannur and Thiruvananthapuram has been doubled and electrified. Two new lines are proposed from Chengannur: one to Thiruvananthapuram via Adoor and the other to Sabarimala via Pathanamthitta. Furthermore, an MRTS is proposed to be established between Thiruvananthapuram and Chengannur. There is one more small railway station at Cheriyanadu, which is 6 km from the town centre.

=== Air ===
Chengannur is served by the Trivandrum International Airport, which is about 115 kilometers from the city via Main Central Road. Another airport is Cochin International Airport, which is 125 km from Chengannur via MC Road

== Climate ==
Köppen-Geiger climate classification system classifies its climate as tropical monsoon (Am).

Climate data for Chengannur, Kerala
Month	Jan	Feb	Mar	Apr	May	Jun	Jul	Aug	Sep	Oct	Nov	Dec	Year
Mean daily maximum °C (°F)	31.2 (88.2)	31.7 (89.1)	32.6 (90.7)	32.7 (90.9)	32.1 (89.8)	29.9 (85.8)	29.4 (84.9)	29.4 (84.9)	29.9 (85.8)	30 (86)	30 (86)	30.7 (87.3)	30.8 (87.4)
Daily mean °C (°F)	26.8 (80.2)	27.5 (81.5)	28.6 (83.5)	29.1 (84.4)	28.7 (83.7)	26.9 (80.4)	26.5 (79.7)	26.5 (79.7)	26.9 (80.4)	26.9 (80.4)	26.7 (80.1)	26.7 (80.1)	27.3 (81.2)
Mean daily minimum °C (°F)	22.5 (72.5)	23.4 (74.1)	24.7 (76.5)	25.5 (77.9)	25.4 (77.7)	24 (75)	23.6 (74.5)	23.7 (74.7)	23.9 (75.0)	23.9 (75.0)	23.5 (74.3)	22.7 (72.9)	23.9 (75.0)
Average precipitation mm (inches)	21 (0.8)	34 (1.3)	59 (2.3)	156 (6.1)	308 (12.1)	574 (22.6)	522 (20.6)	358 (14.1)	278 (10.9)	329 (13.0)	211 (8.3)	54 (2.1)	2,904 (114.2)
Source: Climate-Data.org (altitude: 13m)

== Politics ==
=== Lok Sabha ===
Chengannur is a part of the Mavelikara constituency, which after demarcation extends from Changanassery in the Kottayam district to Kottarakkara in the Kollam district. Kodikunnil Suresh of the INC has been representing the Mavelikkara constituency since 2009.

=== State Assembly ===
Chengannur's assembly constituency (Number 110) is a part of the Mavelikkara (Lok Sabha constituency). The first speaker of the Kerala legislative assembly, Sankaranarayanan Thampi, was an MLA from Chengannur. K. K. Ramachandran Nair was the MLA from 2016 onwards. He died and was replaced in the by-elections conducted on 28 May 2018 by Saji Cherian of Left Democratic Front.

=== Administration ===
Chengannur Town officials
Municipal Chairman	Smt. Shoba Varughese
Sub Collector
Deputy Superintendent of Police	

The two administrative systems prevailing in Chengannur are Revenue and local self-government. As per the revenue system, Chengannur is one of the two revenue divisions of the Alappuzha district. The Chengannur revenue division comprises the Karthikapally, Chengannur, and Mavelikkara taluks consisting of a total of 44 villages. Under the local self-government system, Chengannur is divided into 1 statutory town and development blocks consisting of 11 panchayats.

== Economy ==
There are many state Government offices, banks, and educational institutions located in Chengannur. A good number of people work in these institutions. Another major source of income is from the non-residential Indians, which is a common economical factor in the central Travancore region and the rest of Kerala as well. Agriculture is also there in the outskirts, but mostly confined to rubber plantations. There are no major industries in Chengannur, but a number of small scale industries are present. Major private employers are limited to banks, hospitals, and shops.

Chengannur Central Hatchery in Chengannur, which was started in 1961, was Asia's biggest poultry hatchery under government initiative.

In the Sabarimala season, which starts from mid-November to mid-January, there is a huge boost in economical activities in this town. Since Chengannur is the nearest railway station to Sabarimala Temple, most devotees use this railway station to visit the temple. During this season a boost in restaurant, hotel, and transportation business is visible.

== Notable people ==
- Viralminda Nayanar- 9th Century Nayanar Saint
- Sakthibhadran - 9th Century author of the first ever sanskrit drama (Aascharya Choodamani) from southern India
- George Joseph - Indian Freedom Fighter and Editor of Young India, The Independent (India) magazines
- M. R. Kurup - ISRO Scientist and Founder of the First Solid Rocket Propellant Plant in India
- K. M. Cherian - Renowned Cardiac Surgeon who performed India's first coronary artery bypass surgery
- Chenganoor Raman Pillai - Kathakali Artist
- Puthencavu Mathan Tharakan - Malayalam Poet
- Sivaraman Cheriyanad - Malayalam writer and teacher
- Acharya Narendra Bhooshan - Indian linguist and Vedic Scholar
- Captain Thomas Philipose - Maha Vir Chakra Awardee
- Pothan Joseph - Renowned Journalist
- Puthenpurayil Mathew Joseph - Renowned Educationist and Founder Principal of Laxmibai National College of Physical Education
- Mela Raghu - Indian actor
- Sony Cheruvathur - Former Captain of Kerala cricket team
- Saji Cherian - Minister for Fisheries, Culture and Youth Affairs, Government of Kerala
- Karun Nair - Indian national team cricketer

== Places of worship ==
The population of Chengannur mainly practices Hinduism and Christianity. Muslims are also found in the M.C. Road Mulakuzha region of the town. Most of the Muslims are living in the Kollakadavu and Mannar areas.

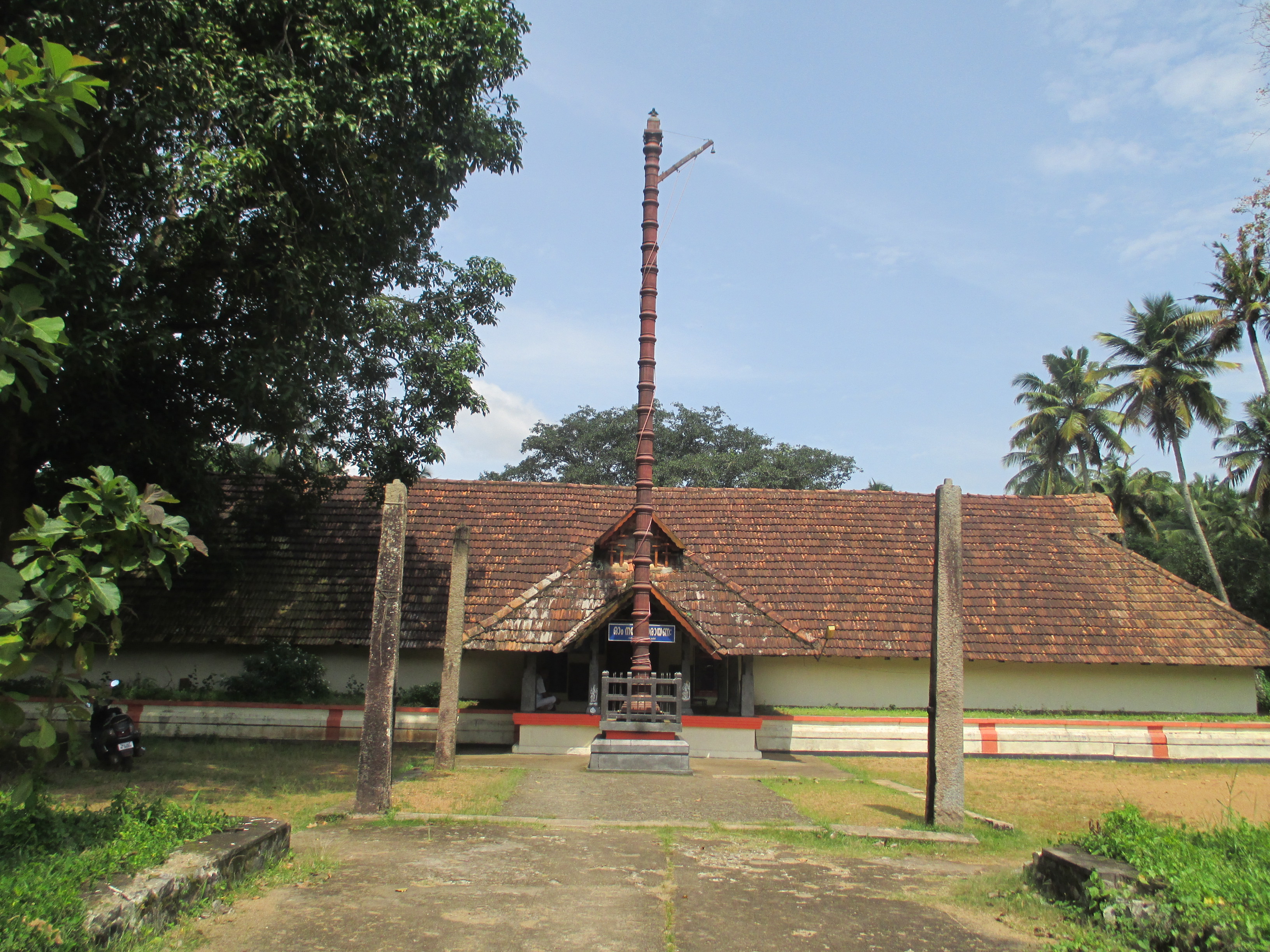
The Vanjippuzha Palace had close architectural similarities to that of Thrichittatt Temple

- Chengannur Mahadeva Temple
- Thripuliyoor Mahavishnu Temple
- Thrichittatt Maha Vishnu Temple
- Anandeswaram Sree Mahadeva Kshethram
- Cheriyanad Sree Balasubrahmanya Swami Temple
- Kallisseri Azhakiyakavu Devi Temple
- Pazhaya Suriyani Pally (Old Syrian Church)
- St. Mary's Orthodox Cathedral, Puthencavu
- Thiruvanvandoor_Mahavishnu_Temple

== Educational organizations ==
Technical Institutions

- College of Engineering Chengannur : Established in 1993, CEC is the first self financing engineering college in Kerala. Now it is ranked among the top 20 engineering colleges in Kerala
- Mount Zion Institute of Science & Technology, Kozhuvalloor
- St. Thomas College of Engineering and Technology, Kozhuvalloor
- Providence College of Engineering, Chengannur
- College of Applied Science, Perissery, Chengannur
- Govt. Industrial Training Institute, Chengannur

Non Technical Institutions

- Christian College, Chengannur: Established in 1963 by the Malankara Marthoma Syrian Church and affiliated to Kerala University. This college offers bachelor's and master's degrees in various subjects
- Sree Narayana College, Ala, Chengannur
- Sree Ayyappa College, Eramallikkara, Chengannur
- Mar Ivanios Law College, Puliyoor
- Dr. KM Cheriyan, Institute of Medical Sciences, Kallissery, Chengannur

== See also ==
- Alappuzha
- Aranmula
- Changanassery
- Kadampur
- Kayamkulam
- Mavelikkara
- Pandalam
- Thiruvalla
