= Chengannur Mahadeva Temple =

Hindu temple in Kerala, India

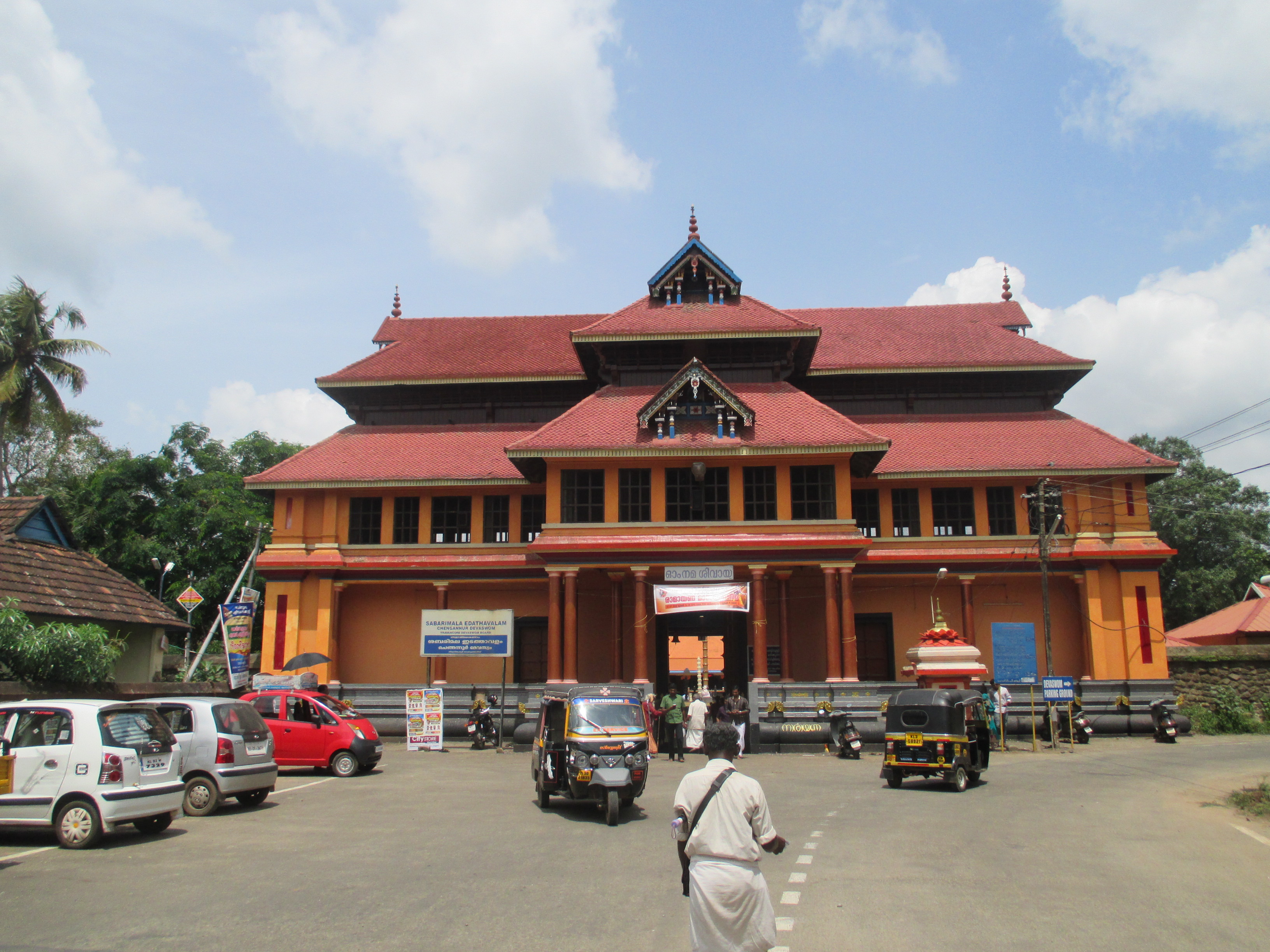

- Mahadeva Temple, Chengannur, Alappuzha, Kerala

Religion
- Affiliation: Hinduism
- District: Alappuzha
- Deity: Mahadeva (Shiva); Bhagavati (parvathi or mahakali)
- Festivals: Varshikotsav (yearly festival); Shivaratri; Chitrapournami; Thripputhu

Location
- Location: Chengannur
- State: Kerala
- Country: India
- Coordinates: 9°19′27.5″N 76°36′41.1″E

Architecture
- Type: Dravidian architecture; Kerala architecture
- Creator: Perumthachan

Specifications
- Temple: One
- Elevation: 49.28 m (162 ft)

Chengannur Mahadeva Temple is a prominent Hindu temple, dedicated to Shiva and located in the town of Chengannur in the South Indian state of Kerala. The temple is one of the major Shiva temples in Kerala, along with the Ettumanoor Mahadevar Temple, Kaduthruthy Mahadeva Temple, Vaikom Temple, Ernakulam Shiva Temple and Vadakkunnathan Temple. goddess Parvati is worshipped with equal importance.There are shrines for Ganesha, Dakshinamurti, Subrahmanya, Shasta, Krishna, Nilagriva, Sthalisha, Hanuman, Ganga, and serpent deities inside and outside the temple complex.

The temple celebrates a rare menstruation festival for parvathi, called Thripputhu (Malayalam: തൃപ്പൂത്ത്), during which the temple is closed for three days for the irregular menstruation of the deity. There are five daily pujas done in the temple, three sarabalies for Shiva and three for Parvati. Tantric worship is led by a member of the Thazhamon Madom family. The yearly festival (vaarshika ulsavam) is celebrated from December to January and lasts 28 days. The temple is administered by the Travancore Devaswom Board.

== Legend ==
It is believed that Parvati, the consort of Shiva, came here after marrying him in the Himalayas. Parvati had her menstrual period for 28 days. Bhadrakali is considered a reincarnation of Sati, whose Kamakhya Temple fell in the north. Another variant of the same legend indicates that the sage Agastya, who could not witness Shiva and Parvati's sacred marriage, was visited by the pair afterward. Since Parvati was menstruating, she waited for 28 days to give darshan to the sage.

== Architecture ==
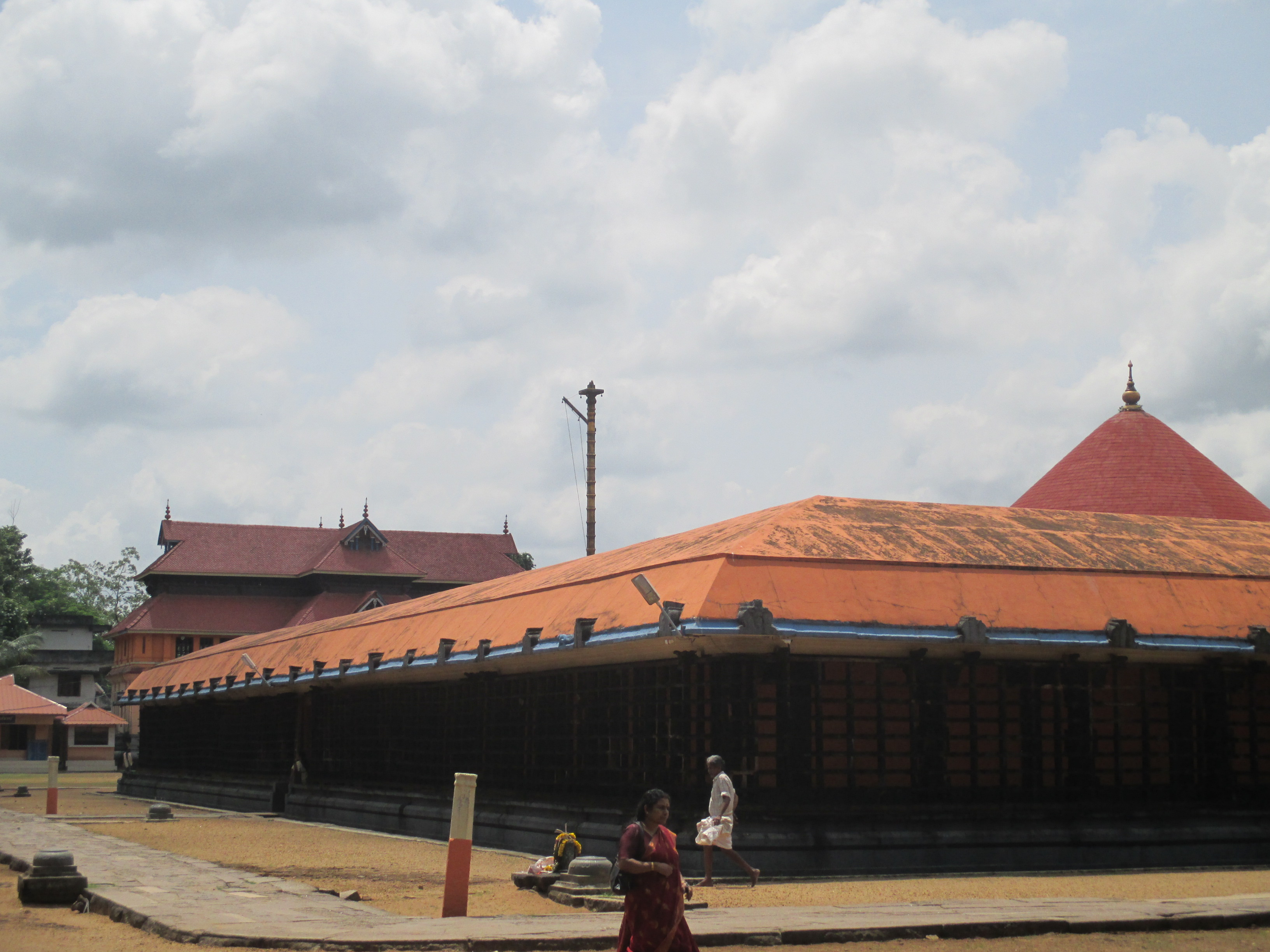
Temple tower along with the sanctum

The temple is located in the heart of Chengannur, very close to the Pamba River. The town is considered one of the 32 Namputiri towns in Kerala, and Mahadeva (Shiva) is believed to be the god of the town. The presiding deity Mahadeva in the form of a lingam faces east, while the image of his consort Bhadrakali is located behind it facing west. The temple is approached through a temple tower, built in Kerala style, and by passing a golden flagstaff, both of which are axial to the central shrine. There are shrines around the temple in the second precinct for Shasta and Nilagriva, while an image of Ganesha is seen in the first precinct. The image of Bhadrakali is made of panchaloha, an alloy of five metals. It is believed that Perumachuten brought the image to the temple.

The temple is built in Kerala-style architecture, which is common in all temples in the South Indian state of Kerala. The temple has a two-storeyed gopuram or gateway tower, with the upper story having wooden rails covering the kottupura (a hall of drum beating during festivals). A rectangular wall called the kshetra-madilluka, pierced by gateways, encloses all of the temple's shrines. The metal-plated flagstaff or dvajasthambam is located axial to the temple tower leading to the central sanctum, and there is a deepastambha, which is a lamp post. The chuttambalam is the outer pavilion within the temple walls. The central shrine and the associated hall is located in a rectangular structure called nalambalam. Between the entrance of the nalambalam and the sanctum, there is a raised square platform called a namaskara mandapa which has a pyramidal roof. Thevrapura, the kitchen used to cook offerings to the deity is located on the left of the namaskara mandapa from the entrance. Balithara is an altar used for making ritualistic offerings to demigods and the festive deities. The central shrine called the sri-kovil houses the image of the presiding deity. It is on an elevated platform with a single door reached through a flight of five steps. Both sides of the doors have images of guardian deities called Dvarapalakas. As per Kerala rituals, only the main priest called Thantri and the second priest called Melshanthi can enter the sri-kovil. The central shrine has a circular plan with a base of granite, superstructure of laterite and conical roof made of terracotta tile supported from inside by a wooden structure. The lower half of the sri-kovil consists of the basement, the pillar or the wall, called stambha or bhithi and the entablature called prasthara in the ratio 1:2:1, in height. Similarly the upper half is divided into the neck called griva, the roof tower called shikhara and the finial kalasam (made of copper) in the same ratio. The roof projects in two levels to protect the inner structure from heavy rains during monsoon seasons. The roof of the temple and some of the pillars have lavish wood and stucco carvings depicting various stories of ancient epics, the Ramayana and Mahabharata.

== Festival and worship practises ==
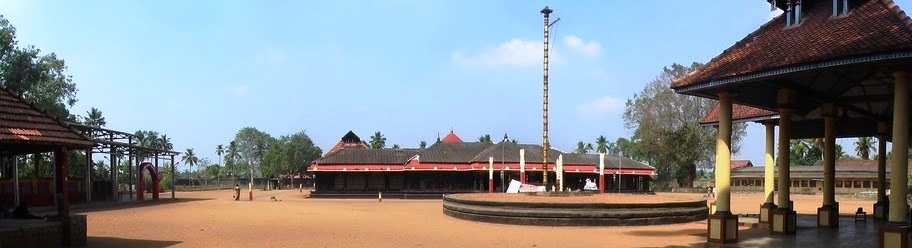
A view of the temple premises

There are five daily pujas done in the temple, three sarabalies for Shiva and three for Bhadrakali. Tantric worship is done by a member of the Thazhamon family. The temple celebrates a rare menstruation festival for Bhadrakali, called Thripputhu, during which the temple is closed for three days during the irregular menstruation of the deity. The appearance of a stain in the white garment is considered an aspect of devotion. As per accounts of the temple officials, in modern times, the feature is observed once in three or four months, while it was regularly observed during the olden times. The ceremony usually resembles the puberty ceremony of high-class girls in Kerala. The sri-kovil is closed during the three days and opened after a purification ceremony is performed during the fourth day.

Thiruppooth Aratt is a festival celebrated in the temple at least thrice a year when the festival images of Mahadeva and Bhadrakali are taken in a procession on decorated elephants to the Pamba River. A holy dip, called arat is offered to the images and the decorated images are taken back to the temple. Women devotees carry traditional thalappoli lamps during the procession. The procession is accompanied by a temple orchestra and panchavadyam. The major festivals in the temple are flag hoisting on the Thiruvathirai month of Dhanu and Aaraattu during the Thiruvathirai month of Makaram. The yearly festival is celebrated from December to January and lasts 28 days.

== See also ==
- Temples of Kerala
- Temple festivals of Kerala
