= Thiruvanvandoor Mahavishnu Temple =

Hindu temple in Thiruvanvandoor

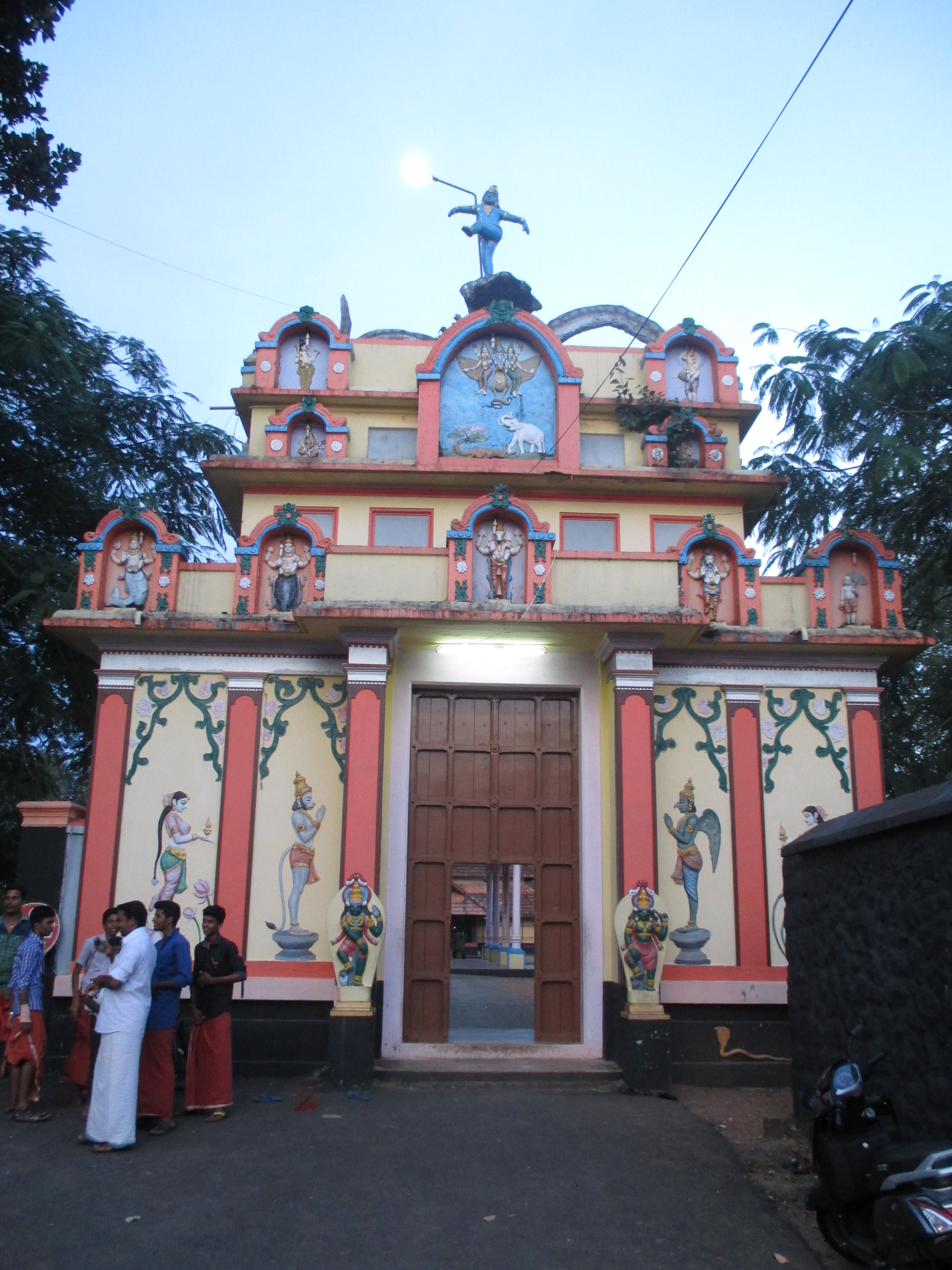

- Location in Kerala

Religion
- Affiliation: Hinduism
- District: Alapuzha
- Deity: Pambanaiappan (Vishnu) Gosala Krishna (Vishnu)

Location
- Location: Thiruvanvandoor
- State: Kerala
- Country: India
- Coordinates: 9°20′35″N 76°34′47″E

Architecture
- Type: Dravidian architecture

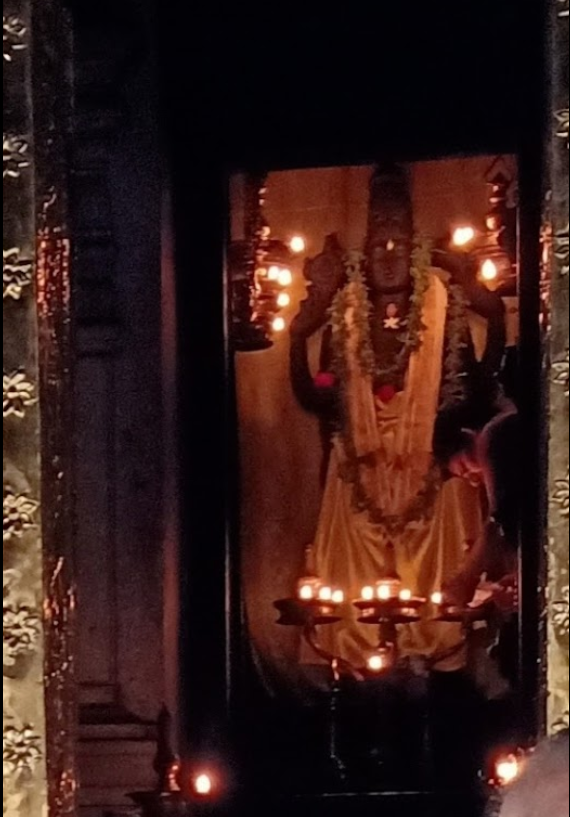
Thiruvanvandoor Pambanaiappan

The Thiruvanvandoor Mahavishnu Temple is a Hindu temple dedicated to Vishnu and located in Thiruvanvandoor, Alappuzha District, Kerala, South India. Constructed in the Kerala style of architecture, the temple is glorified in the Nalayira Divya Prabandham, the early medieval Tamil canon of the Alvar saints from the 6th–9th centuries CE. It is one of the 108 Divya Desams dedicated to Vishnu, who is worshipped as Paambanaiappan. The nearest railway station to the temple is located in Chengannur, while the nearest airport is Trivandrum International Airport.

It is one of the five ancient shrines in the Chengannur area of Kerala, connected with the legend of Mahabharata, where the five Pandavas are believed to have built one temple each; Thrichittatt Maha Vishnu Temple by Yudhishthira, Puliyur Mahavishnu Temple by Bheema, Aranmula Parthasarathy Temple by Arjuna, Thiruvanvandoor Mahavishnu Temple by Nakula and Thrikodithanam Mahavishnu Temple by Sahadeva.

The temple is open from 4 am to 11:00 am and 5 pm to 8 pm and is administered by Travancore Devaswom Board of the Government of Kerala.

== Legend and history ==
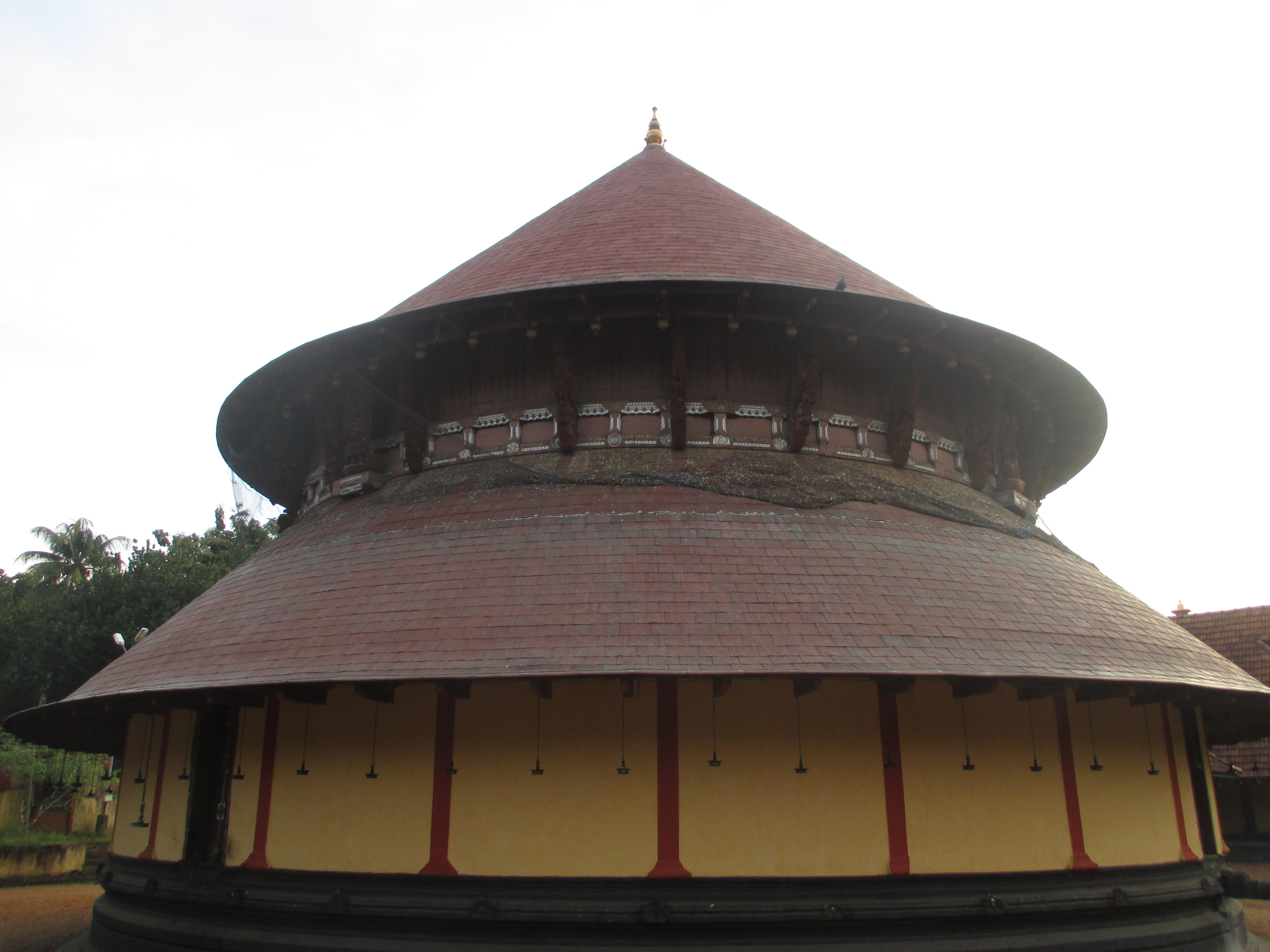
Image of the tower over the sanctum sanctorum

It is one of the five ancient shrines in the Chengannur area of Kerala, connected with the legend of Mahabharata. Legend has it that the Pandava princes, after crowning Parikshit as king of Hastinapura left on a pilgrimage. On arriving on the banks of river Pamba, each one is believed to have installed a tutelary image of Krishna; Thrichittatt Maha Vishnu Temple by Yudhishthira, Puliyur Mahavishnu Temple by Bhima, Aranmula Parthasarathy Temple by Arjuna, Thiruvanvandoor Mahavishnu Temple by Nakula and Thrikodithanam Mahavishnu Temple by Sahadeva.

The famous Pamba river is near the temple and hence the name of the deity is Paambanaiappan. As per another legend, the temple is believed to be consecrated by the sage Bhrigu. The temple is counted as one of the five temples built and worshipped by Pandavas from Mahabharatha.

Earliest references to this temple appear in the poems and hymns composed by the greatest of Alvar saints - Nammalvar, in circa 800 CE. Stone inscriptions in the temple date it back to the Second Chera Empire (800 - 1102 CE). The temple is open from 4 am to 11:00 am and 5 pm to 8 pm and is administered by Travancore Devaswom Board of the Government of Kerala.

== Architecture ==
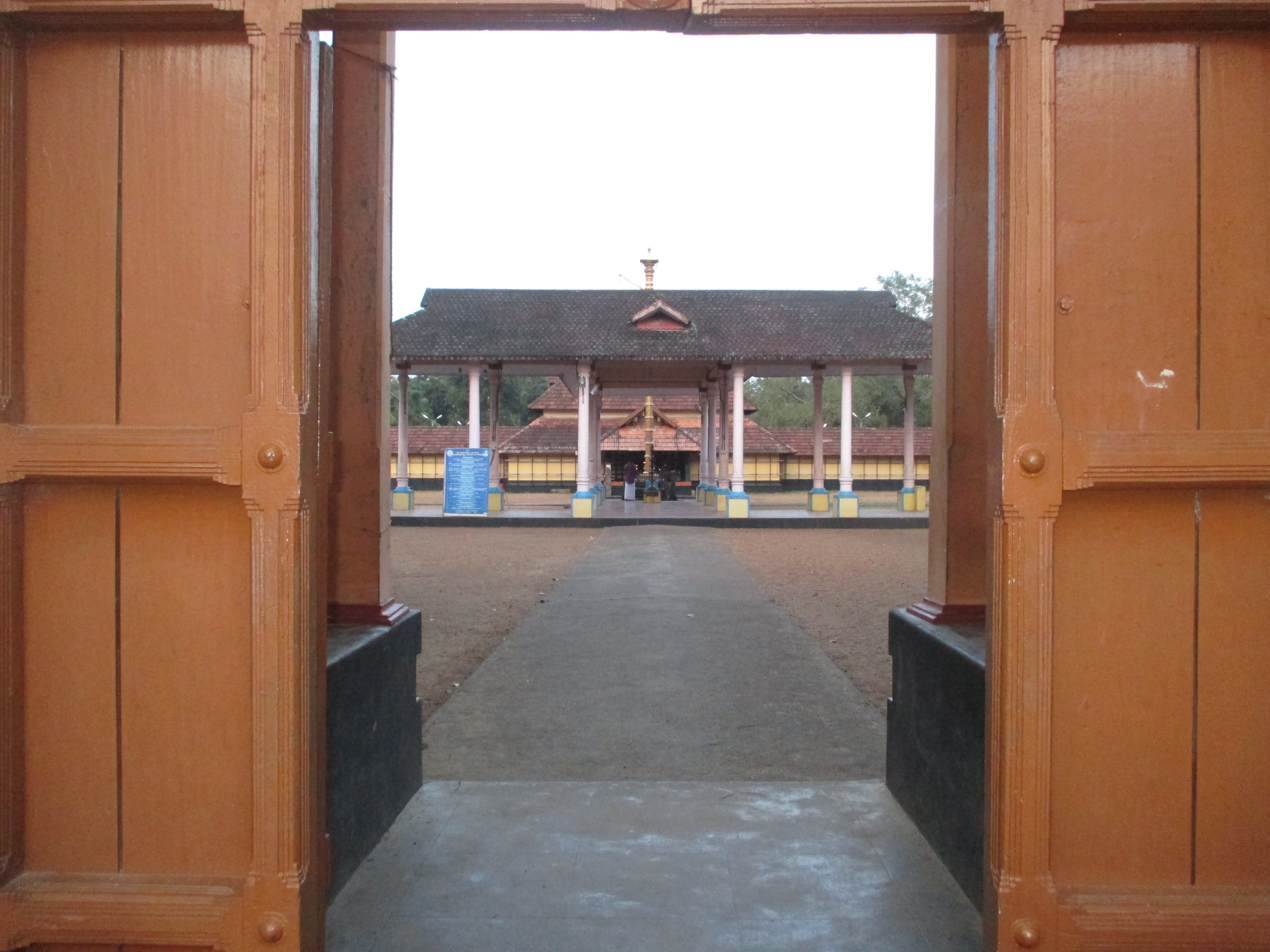
View of the temple from the gateway tower

The temple is built in Kerala style architecture, which is common in all temples in the South Indian state of Kerala in Eastern axis. The temple has a two storeyed gopuram or a gateway tower, with the upper story having wooden trails covering the Kottupura (a hall of drum beating during festivals). A rectangular wall around the temple, called Kshetra-Madilluka pierced by the gateways, encloses all the shrines of the temple. The metal plated flagpost or dvajasthambam is located axial to the temple tower leading to the central sanctum and there is a Deepastamba, which is the light post. Chuttuambalam is the outer pavilion within the temple walls. The central shrine and the associated hall is located in a rectangular structure called Nallambalam, which has pillared halls and corridors. Between the entrance of Nallambalam to the sanctum, there is a raised square platform called Namaskara Mandapa which has a pyramidal roof. Thevrapura, the kitchen used to cook offering to the deity is located on the left of Namaskara Mandapa from the entrance. Balithara is an altar is used for making ritualistic offering to demi-gods and the festive deities. The central shrine called Sreekovil houses the image of the presiding deity. It is on an elevated platform with a single door reached through a flight of five steps. Either sides of the doors have images of guardian deities called dvarapalakas. As per Kerala rituals, only the main priest called Thantri and the second priest called Melshanthi alone can enter the Sree Kovil. The central shrine has a circular plan with the base built of granite, superstructure built of laterite and conical roof made of terracota tile supported from inside by a wooden structure. The lower half of Sree Kovil consists of the basement, the pillar or the wall, called stambha or bhithi and the entablature called prasthara in the ratio 1:2:1, in height. Similarly the upper half is divided into the neck called griva, the roof tower called shikhara and the conical kalasam (made of copper) in the same ratio. The roof projects in two levels to protect the inner structure from heavy rains during monsoon. The roof of the temple and some of the pillars have lavish wood and stucco carvings depicting various stories of ancient epics, Ramayana and Mahabharata. The outer walls around the sanctum have a series of wooden frames housing an array of lamps, which are lit during festive occasions. The temples have paintings on its walls dating back to early 18 century.

== Festival ==
The annual Tiruvaymoli festival is celebrated in commemoration of Nammalvar, the saint poet of 8th century. The annual 51-day festival to commemorate the installation of idol of Sreekrishna is concluded with Gajamela, where a parade of 21 caparisoned elephants is held. The floats depict depicting Puranic themes and are accompanied by music players playing Mayuranrithom, Krishnanattom, Karakom, Nadaswarom, Panchavadyam, and Pancharimelom. A team of Pancharimelam performers offer rendition during the event. During the evening Kathakali performers where artiste perform various historic themes.

== See also ==
- Temples of Kerala
