= Puliyur Mahavishnu Temple =

Vishnu temple in Kerala

Thripuliyoor Mahavishnu Temple
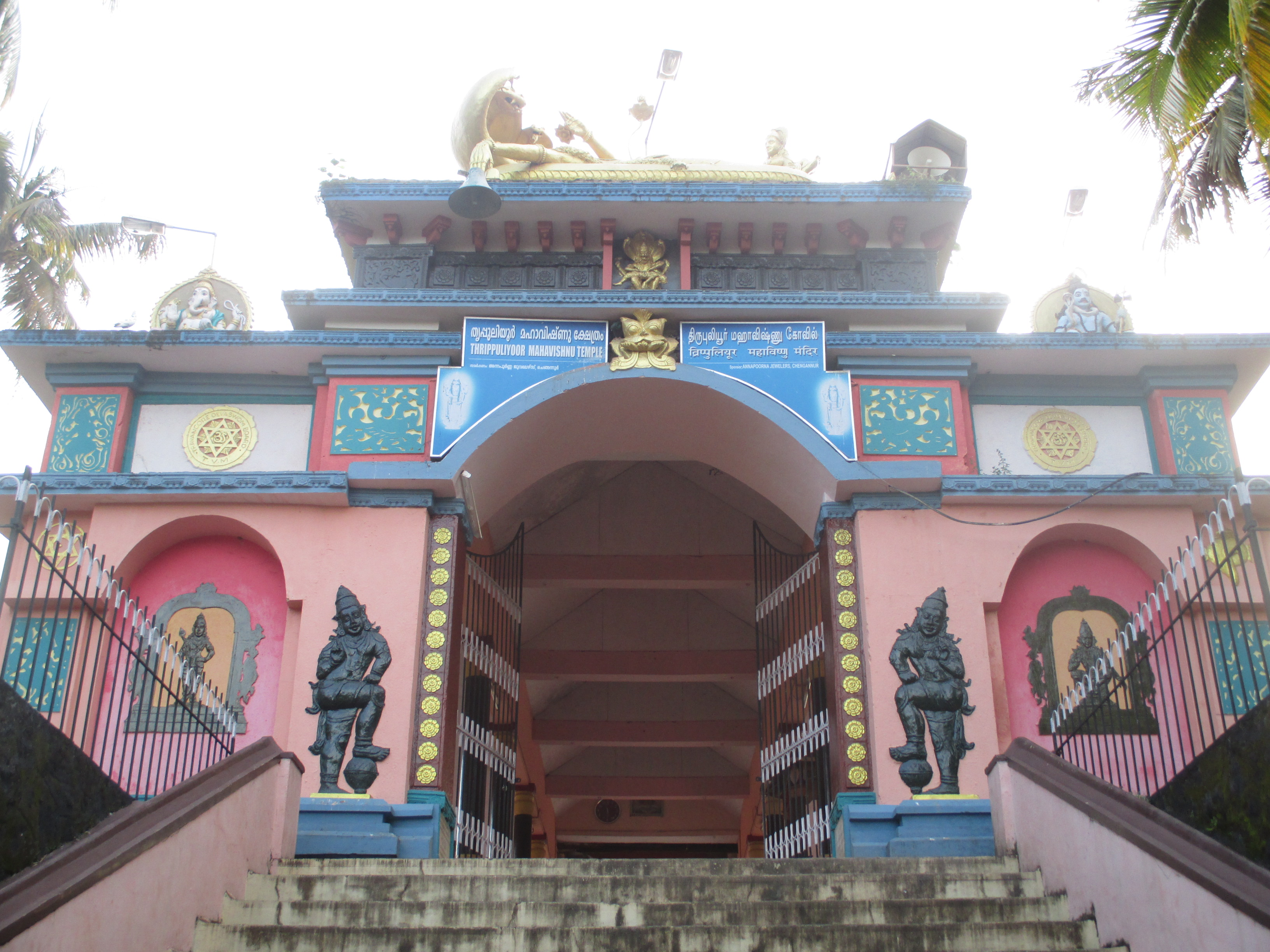

- Location in Kerala

Religion
- Affiliation: Hinduism
- District: Alappuzha
- Deity: Mayapiran (Vishnu) Porkodi Naachiyar (Lakshmi)
- Festival: Kavadi maholsavam

Location
- Location: Puliyoor
- State: Kerala
- Country: India
- Interactive map of Thripuliyoor Mahavishnu Temple
- Coordinates: 9°18′07″N 76°35′09″E

Architecture
- Type: Dravidian architecture

The Thripuliyoor Mahavishnu Temple (also called Mayapiran temple) is a Hindu temple dedicated to Vishnu and located in Puliyoor, Alappuzha District, Kerala, South India. Constructed in the Kerala style of architecture, the temple is glorified in the Nalayira Divya Prabandham, the early medieval Tamil canon of the Alvar saints from the 6th–9th centuries CE. It is one of the 108 Divya Desams dedicated to Vishnu, who is worshipped as Mayapiran/Thripuliyoorappan. The nearest railway station to the temple is located at Chengannur, while the nearest airport is Trivandrum International airport.

It is one of the five ancient shrines in the Chengannur area of Kerala, connected with the legend of Mahabharata, where the five Pandavas are believed to have built one temple each; Thrichittatt Maha Vishnu Temple by Yudhishthira, Puliyoor Mahavishnu Temple by Bhima, Aranmula Parthasarathy Temple by Arjuna, Thiruvanvandoor Mahavishnu Temple by Nakula and Thrikodithanam Mahavishnu Temple by Sahadeva.

The Aratu festival during the Tamil month of Margaḻi and the Kavadiattam during the month of Thai are the major festivals celebrated in the temple. The temple is open from 4 am to 11 am and 5 pm to 8 pm and is administered by Travancore Devaswom Board of the Government of Kerala.

== Legend ==
It is one of the five ancient shrines in the Chengannur area of Kerala, connected with the legend of Mahabharata. Legend has it that the Pandava princes, after crowning Parikshit as king of Hastinapura left on a pilgrimage. On arriving on the banks of river Pamba, each one is believed to have installed idols of Krishna; Thrichittatt Maha Vishnu Temple by Yudhishthira, Puliyur Mahavishnu Temple by Bheema, Aranmula Parthasarathy Temple by Arjuna, Thiruvanvandoor Mahavishnu Temple by Nakula and Thrikodithanam Mahavishnu Temple by Sahadeva.

It is said that this Place is constructed and built by Bhima, one of the Pandavas. He worshipped the deity of this temple, Mayapiran. the seven sages - Atri, Vasishtar, Kashyapar, Gautamar, Bharadvajar, Vishvamitra, and Jamadagni got the seva of this Maayapiraan along with porkodi Naachiyaar and through Indra, it is said that all these Saptarishis got their Mukti towards the emperuman.

Once, Virukshadharbi, who was the son of Sibhi Chakravarthy, ruled an empire where there was flood and there was no proper vegetation and the wealth and the beauty of the entire empire seems to be decreasing. At that time, the king thought, if any austerities were given to Sapta Rishis, it might increase the wealth and beauty of the Empire. As a result of this, he invited Saptarishis, the seven important sages. But, the Saptarishis did not accept his charity, since they felt that the reduction of wealth and health in the entire empire were on account of the deeds of the ruling king. But, the king wanted them to accept his donation, and as a result of this, he asked his palace officials to keep some gold inside the fruits and give them that, so that they would accept that and simultaneously his charity is also accepted. But, knowing the truth that some golds are placed inside the fruit through their yogic power, the sages did not accept the fruits also. Virukshadharbi got angry with the Saptharishis and tried them to kill and as a result of this cruel mind, he started an Yaagam in which a lady Pishacha by named "Kiruthyai" arose and he ordered the demon to kill all them. Knowing this, Emperumaan sent Indra to destroy Kiruthyai and to protect the sages. Indra killed the demon and all the Sapta Rishis got the seva of the Emperumaan and got their Mukthi.

During Mahabharata war, Bhima underwent penance worshipping the lord here. Bheema was the powerful among the five brothers and this temple is large indicating his largess. Also the Gatha, the weapon used by Bheema is believed to be present in the temple.(this Gatha was recently placed in the temple)

== Architecture ==
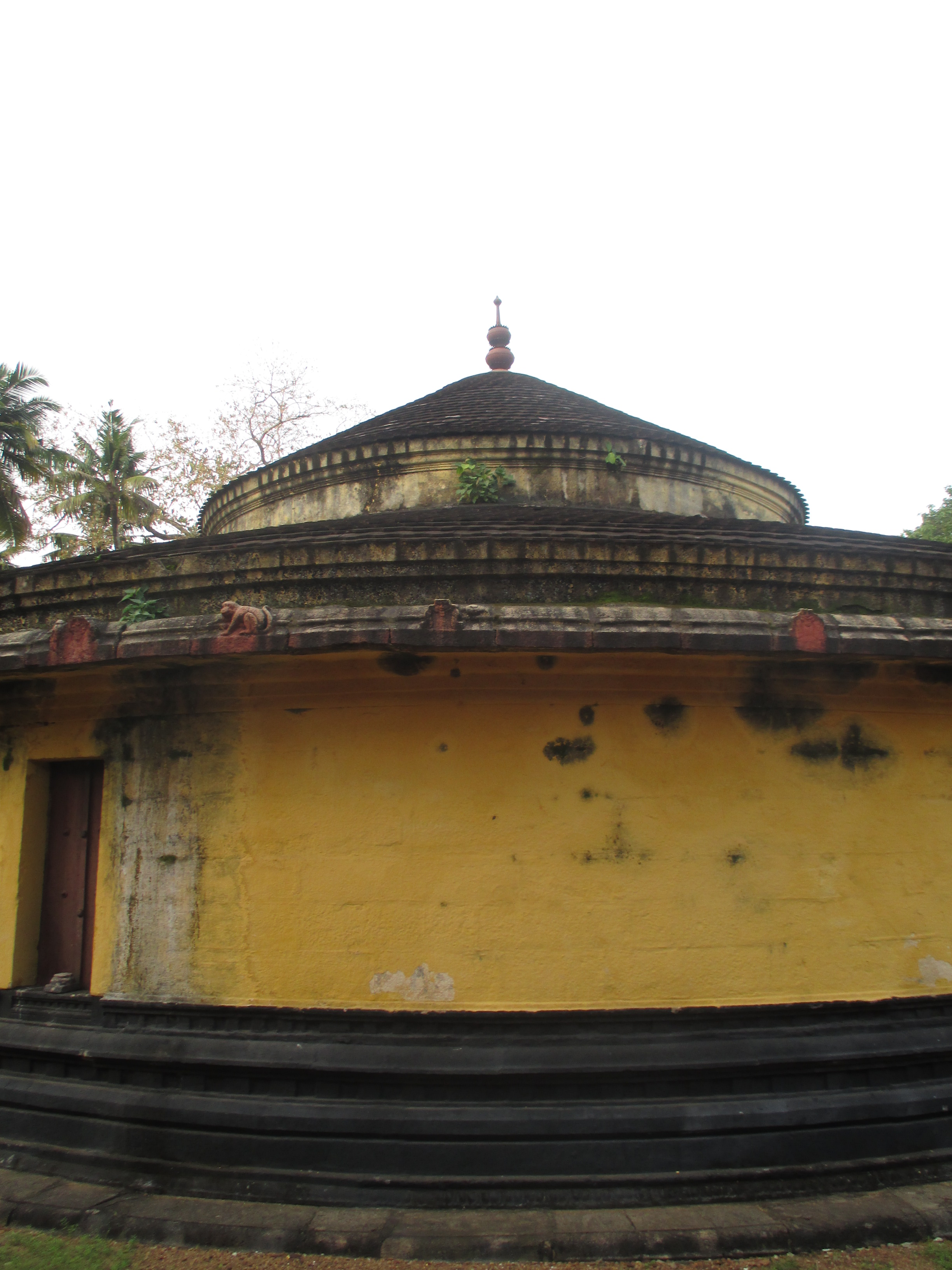
Image of the Sreekoil, the sanctum

Earliest references to this temple appear in the poems and hymns composed by the greatest of Alvar saints - Nammalvar, in circa 800 CE. Stone inscriptions in the temple date it back to the Second Chera Empire (800–1102 CE). Another of the Alvars, Tirumangai Alvar has mentioned Thirupuliyur in one of his verses in his Siriya Thirumadal(2673,71).

The temple is located about 90 km from Ernakulam. The nearest railway stations are Aluva and Angamaly; the nearest airports are Cochin International Airport, and Nedumbassery Airport. The temple is in fact located less than 12 km from Nedumbassery airport. For travelling pilgrims, it is recommended that they stay at Angamaly or Nedumbassery and commute to the temple for Perumal Darshan, as the place has limited facilities for stay. The temple complex enclosed in a large area with picturesque surroundings, holds the main sanctum dedicated to Lakshmana Perumal. The sanctum sanctorum of the main shrine houses the idol of Mahavishnu.

The temple is built in Kerala style architecture, common in all temples in the South Indian state of Kerala in Eastern axis. The temple has no gateway tower and has an arch from the main road. A rectangular wall around the temple, called Kshetra-Madilluka pierced by the gateways, encloses all the shrines of the temple. The metal plated flagpost or dvajasthambam is located axial to the temple tower leading to the central sanctum. Chuttuambalam is the outer pavilion within the temple walls. The central shrine and the associated hall is located in a rectangular structure called Nallambalam, which has pillared halls and corridors. Between the entrance of Nallambalam to the sanctum, there is a raised square platform called Namaskara Mandapa which has a pyramidal roof. Thevrapura, the kitchen used to cook offering to the deity is located on the left of Namaskara Mandapa from the entrance. Balithara is an altar is used for making ritualistic offering to demi-gods and the festive deities. The central shrine called Sreekovil houses the image of the presiding deity. It is on an elevated platform with a single door reached through five steps. As per Kerala rituals, only the main priest called Thantri and the second priest called Melshanthi alone can enter the Sree Kovil. The central shrine has a circular plan with the base built of granite, superstructure built of laterite and conical roof made of terrocata tile supported from inside by a wooden structure. The temple has shrines of Dakshinamurthy, Krishna, Bhagavati, and Ayyappa.

== Festivals, religious importance, and worship practices ==
The temple is open from 5 am to 10 am and 4 pm to 7 pm on all days leaving festive days. The two major festivals celebrated in the temple are Vaikuntha Ekadashi and Thiruvonam. The main annual festival for ten days each year in the month of Medam (April/May). The temple is under the administration of the Travancore Devaswom Board. Mayapiran is revered in Nalayira Divya Prabhandam, the 7th–9th century Vaishnava canon, by Nammalvar and Thirumangai Alvar. The temple is classified as a Divya Desam, one of the 108 Vishnu temples that are mentioned in the book. During the 18th and 19th centuries, the temple finds mention in several works like 108 Tirupati Antati by Divya Kavi Pillai Perumal Aiyangar. The Aratu festival during the Tamil month of Margaḻi and the Kavadiattam during the month of Thai are the major festivals celebrated in the temple. As per literary mention, Thripuliyoor was a division of a large town historically. One of the twelve regions was Kuttanadu in which the temple is located. The Vimanam, the roof over the sanctum is called Purushasukta Vimanam as the seven sages, the Saptarishis, performed penance.

== Sources ==
- Cultural Heritage of Kerala. Kerala, India: DC Books. 2008. ISBN 9788126419036.
- Rao, A.V. Shankaranaryana (2012). Temples of Kerala. Vasan Publications. ISBN 978-81-89888-94-7.
