= Thrichittatt Maha Vishnu Temple =

Vishnu temple in Chengannur

Trichittatt Mahavishnu Temple, Chengannur
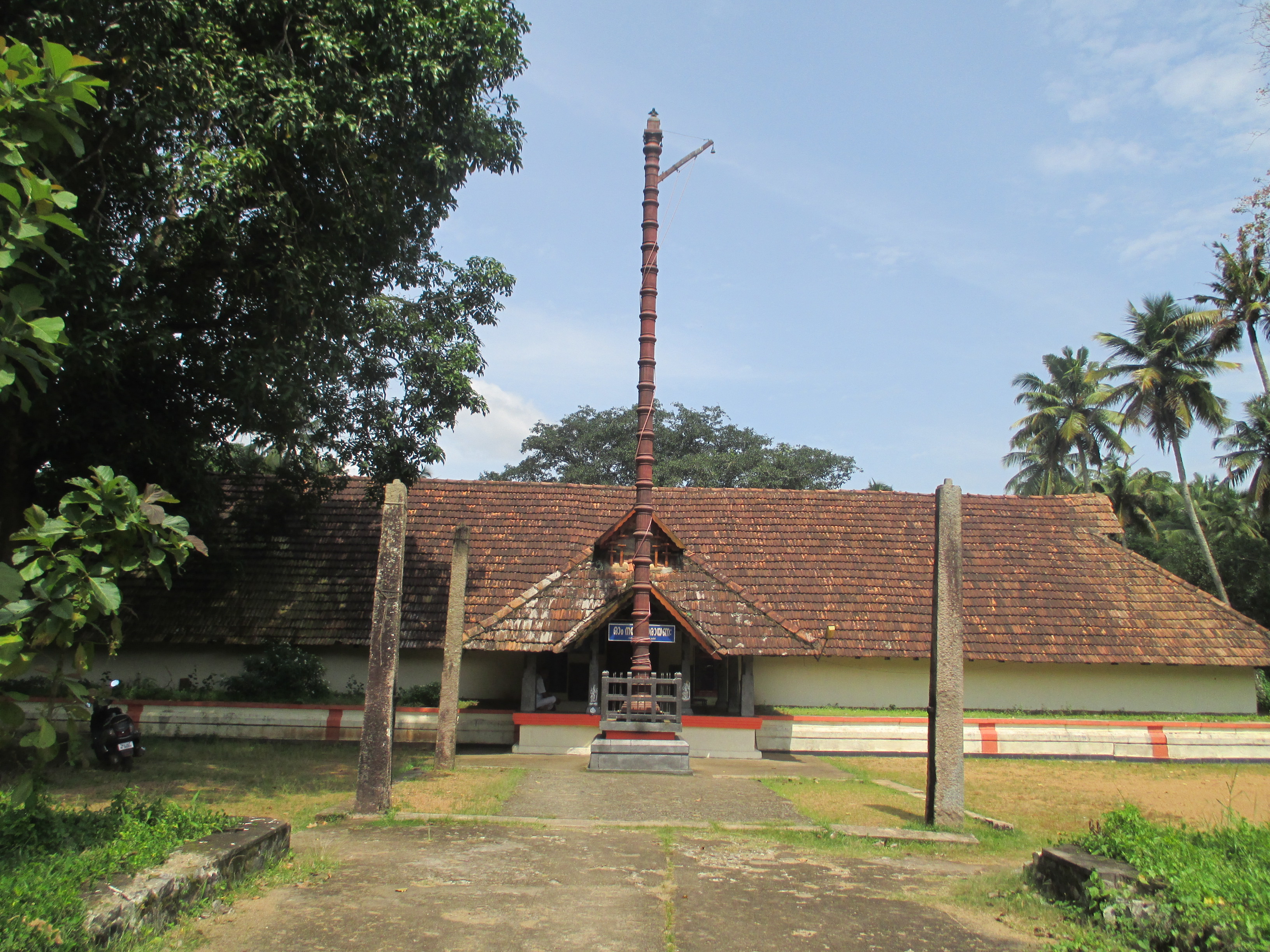

- Location in Kerala

Religion
- Affiliation: Hinduism
- District: Alappuzha
- Deity: Imayavarappa Perumal (Vishnu)

Location
- Location: Chengannur
- State: Kerala
- Country: India
- Coordinates: 9°19′36″N 76°36′15″E

Architecture
- Type: Tamil architecture

The Thrichittatt Mahavishnu Temple (also called Thiruchenkundrur and Imayavarappan temple) is a Hindu temple dedicated to Vishnu, located in Chengannur, Alappuzha District, Kerala, South India. Constructed in the Kerala style of architecture, the temple is glorified in the Nalayira Divya Prabandham, by Nammalvar, one of the Sri Vaishnava saint-poets of the 8th century called the Alvars. It is one of the 108 Divya Desams dedicated to Krishna, an avatar of Vishnu, who is worshipped as Imayavarappan. The nearest railway station to the temple is located in Chengannur, while the nearest airports are Trivandrum International Airport and Cochin International Airport Ernakulam.

It is one of the five ancient shrines in the Chengannur area of Kerala, connected with the legend of Mahabharata, where the five Pandavas are believed to have built one temple each; Thrichittatt Maha Vishnu Temple by Yudhishthira, Puliyur Mahavishnu Temple by Bhima, Aranmula Parthasarathy Temple by Arjuna, Thiruvanvandoor Mahavishnu Temple by Nakula and Thrikodithanam Mahavishnu Temple by Sahadeva.

The temple is open from 5:00 am to 11:00 am and 5:00 pm to 8:00 pm and is administered by Travancore Devaswom Board of the Government of Kerala.

== Legend ==
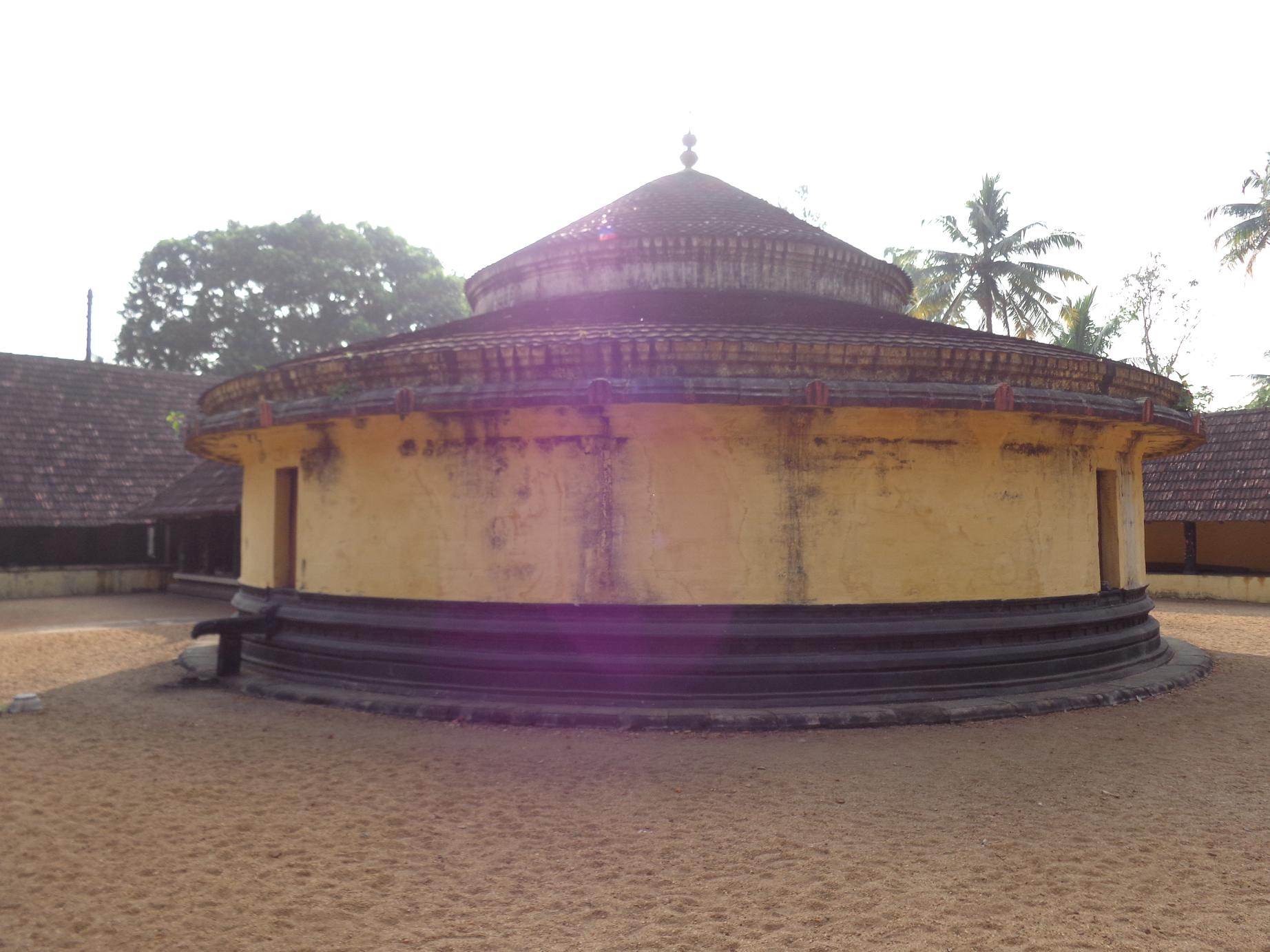
The sanctum of Trichittatt temple

It is one of the five ancient shrines in the Chengannur area of Kerala, connected with the legend of Mahabharata. Legend has it that the Pandava princes, after crowning Parikshit as king of Hastinapura left on a pilgrimage. On arriving on the banks of river Pamba, each one is believed to have installed a tutelary image of Krishna; Thrichittatt Maha Vishnu Temple by Yudhishthira, Puliyur Mahavishnu Temple by Bhima, Aranmula Parthasarathy Temple by Arjuna, Thiruvanvandoor Mahavishnu Temple by Nakula and Thrikodithanam Mahavishnu Temple by Sahadeva.

During the Kurukshetra War, Yudhishthira, the eldest of the Pandavas, who never before uttered a lie, lied in one instant to defeat his guru, Drona. To overcome the sin of the lie, according to this temple's regional legend, he underwent penance worshiping Vishnu here. The (devas) came to this place prior to Yudhishthira and hence the deity here is referred as Imayavarappar. There is another version that the Pandavas worshipped the idols during the reign and started installing them in different places during the end of the reign.

Thiruchittattu temple, is considered to be one among the 108 most sacred place of worship, where it is believed Vishnu himself resides.

The temple is believed to have been built by devas along the banks of Chittar, a tributary of holy river Pampa, before mankind was born. The temple, was then renovated, by Yudhishthira in Dvapara Yuga. The temple is considered to be the primary temple among the five Mahavishnu Temples built by Pandavas.

In Dvapara Yuga, the Pandavas resided at present day Chengannur for a large duration of their exile, hence, after the passing of deity Krishna, Sage Bhrigu persuaded the Pandavas to consecrate four sacred temples in the vicinity, to the deity, who was their guide and protector in Mahabharata

This would allow daily offerings and pooja to be carried out on the benevolent deity, in the form of the Thevaram, not only by Pandavas but also all the people who helped Pandavas survive during the exile. The Pandavas, maintained and performed puja in the five temples till their svargarohanam (Auspicious journey to Vaikuntham)

Yudhishthira on renovation of the temple, installed the Thevara Moorthy of Vishnu with a tutelary image of the deity Krishna. This unique idol, is facing east in a standing posture, with four arms, holding the - Panchajanya (conch) in the upper right hand, Sudarshana Chakra (discus) in the upper left hand, and a lotus in the lower right hand. The lower left hand is free, however Vishnu idols generally have the Kaumodaki (mace) in this hand.

Yudhishthira after having a holy bath, installed the idols after immersing it in the Pushkarani (Pond), filling the Conch with its water and performed the first Pooja after installation

Hence, the pond at Thrichittat is named as - Amurtha Pushkarani, since the idol was immersed in it and as - Shankha Tirtham, on the occasion of the pond's water filling the Conch, therefore, worshipping at Shankha Tirtham, is considered equivalent to that of Sree Kovil (Sanctum Sanctorum of the Temple), and full darshanam is complete when both places are worshipped

== History ==
Earliest references to this temple appear in the poems and hymns composed by the greatest of Alvar saints - Nammalvar, in circa 800 CE. Stone inscriptions in the temple date it back to the Second Chera Empire (800 - 1102 CE). In modern times, the temple is administered by Travancore Devaswom Board of the Government of Kerala. There are no historical records to indicate when the temple was built. As per local legend, the temple was believed to have been built by devas.

== Architecture ==
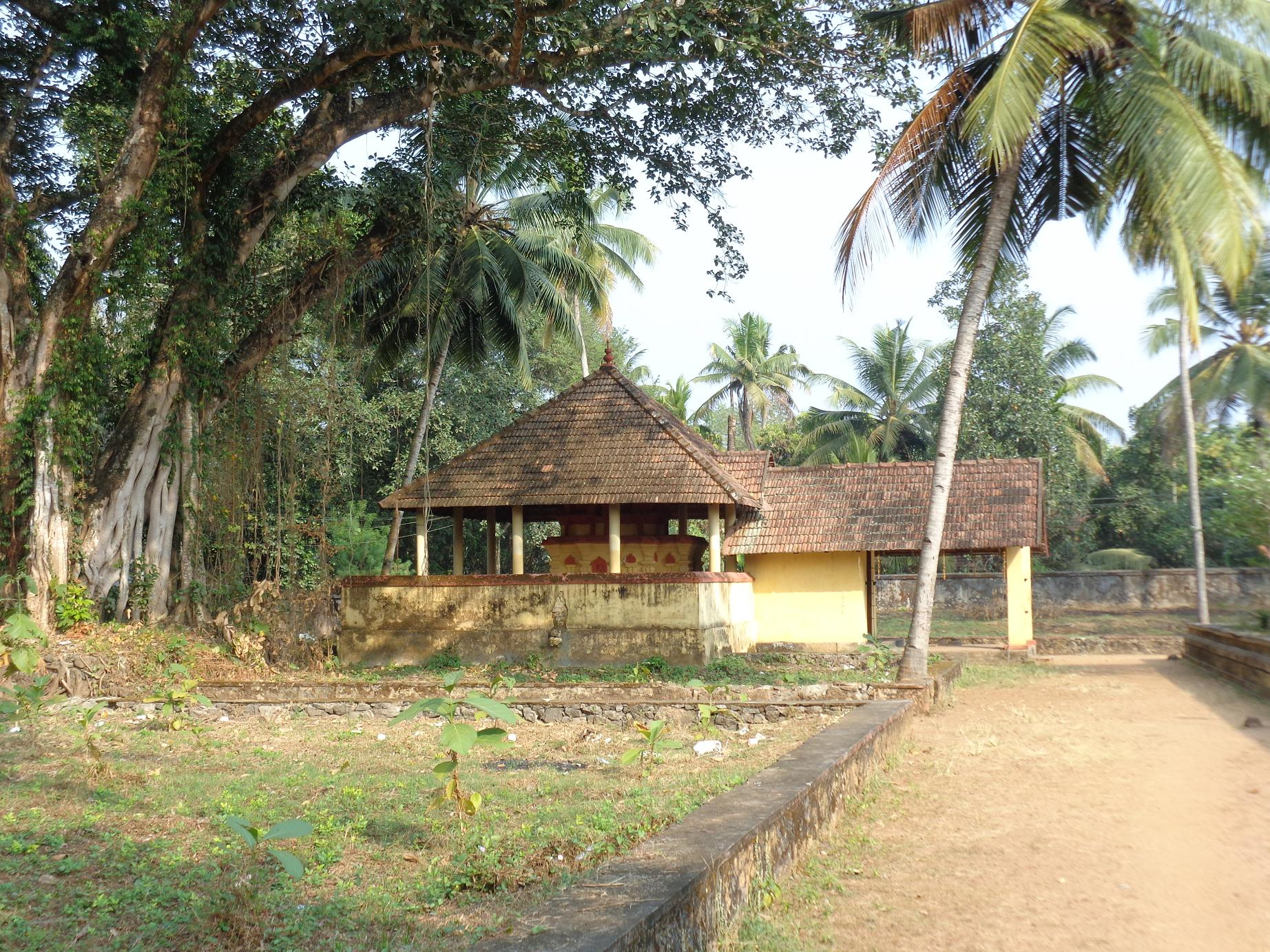
The shrine of Goshalakrishan

The temple is built in Kerala style architecture, common in all temples in the South Indian state of Kerala in Eastern axis. The temple has no gateway tower and has an arch from the main road. A rectangular wall around the temple, called Kshetra-Madilluka pierced by the gateways, encloses all the shrines of the temple. The metal plated flagpost or dvajasthambam is located axial to the temple tower leading to the central sanctum. Chuttuambalam is the outer pavilion within the temple walls. The central shrine and the associated hall is located in a rectangular structure called Nallambalam, which has pillared halls and corridors. Between the entrance of Nallambalam to the sanctum, there is a raised square platform called Namaskara Mandapa which has a pyramidal roof. Thevrapura, the kitchen used to cook offering to the deity is located on the left of Namaskara Mandapa from the entrance. Balithara is an altar is used for making ritualistic offering to demi-gods and the festive deities. The central shrine called Sreekovil houses the image of the presiding deity. It is on an elevated platform with a single door reached through five steps. As per Kerala rituals, only the main priest called Thantri and the second priest called Melshanthi alone can enter the Sree Kovil. The central shrine has a circular plan with the base built of granite, superstructure built of laterite and conical roof made of terrocata tile supported from inside by a wooden structure. The image of the presiding deity is 4 ft (1.2 m) tall. Krishna is in his vishvarupa pose, the one he depicted to Arjuna during the Kurukshetra War. In the second precinct, there are shrines of Sastha, Yakshi, Nagaraja and Erangavil Bhagavathy Balarama in the lower shrine.

== Festival, worship practices and religious importance ==
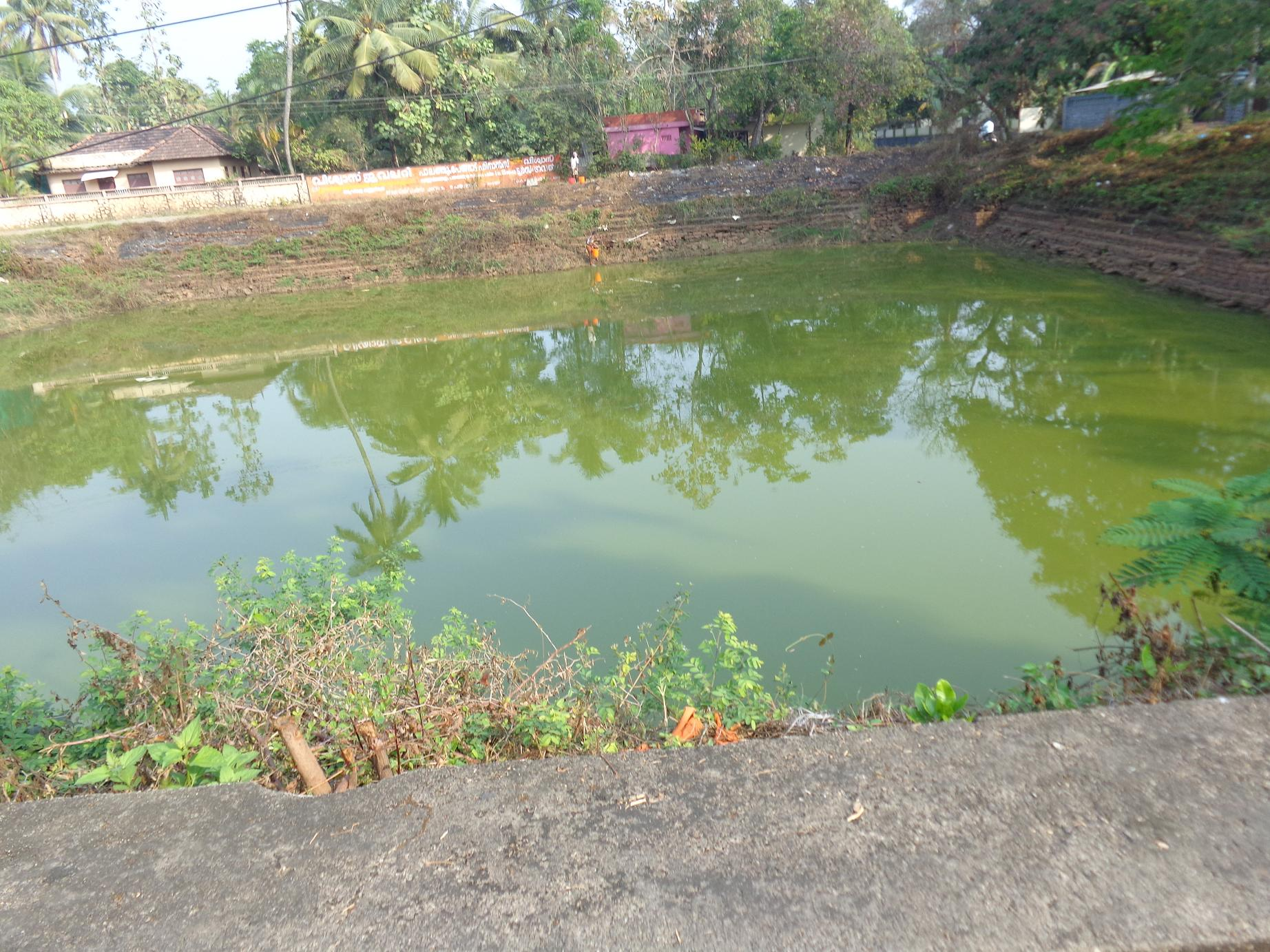
Temple pond (Sanghatheertha)

The temple is open from 5.30 am to 10.30 am and 5-30 pm to 7-30 pm (Thursday 5-30am to 11am and 5-30pm to 7-30pm)on all days leaving festivel days. The major festivals celebrated in the temple are Vaikuntha Ekadashi and Temple festival is at Atham to Thiruvonam (10days)in meenam Month of ME.and Sreekrishna jayanthi as janmastami (Astami -Rohini) . From 1957, the festival of Gosala Krishna Temple at Thiruvanvandoor commences from Thrichittatt Maha Vishnu temple when 25 caparisoned elephants are paraded to the Thiruvanvandoor.

Imayavarppa Perumal temple is revered in Nalayira Divya Prabhandam, the 7th–9th century Sri Vaishnava canon, by Nammalvar. The temple is classified as a Divya Desam, one of the 108 Vishnu temples that are mentioned in the book. During the 18th and 19th centuries, the temple finds mention in several works like 108 Tirupati Antati by Divya Kavi Pillai Perumal Aiyangar.

- Thrippuliyoor Pancha Pandava Mahavishnu Mayappiran (Beemasena Thiruppathi Covil)Temple. (Kuttanadu Thiruppathi).Puliyoor,Chengannur, Alappuzha Dist.
- Thiruvaranmula Pancha Pandava Mahavishnu Parthasaradhi temple.(Arjuna thiruppathi covil)Thirukuralappan. Aranmula, Pathanamthitta Dist.
- Thiruvanvandoor Panchapandava Mahavishnu (Pampanayappan)temple. Nakula thiruppathi kovil
- Thrikkodiththanam Pancha Pandava Mahavishnu Albhuthanarayanan Temple.

Sahadeva Thiruppathi, Thrikkodiththanam, Chenganassery, Kottayam Dist.

- Thiruvallavizha Mahavishnu Kolapperumal Temple Thiruvalla, Pathanamthitta Dist.
- Thrikkaakara Vamanamoorthi Temple, Thrikkaakkara, Ernakulam Dist.
- Thirumittakode Anchumoorthi Temple
- Thirunavaya Navamukunda Temple
