= Aranmula Parthasarathy Temple =

Hindu temple of Krishna near Aranmula, India

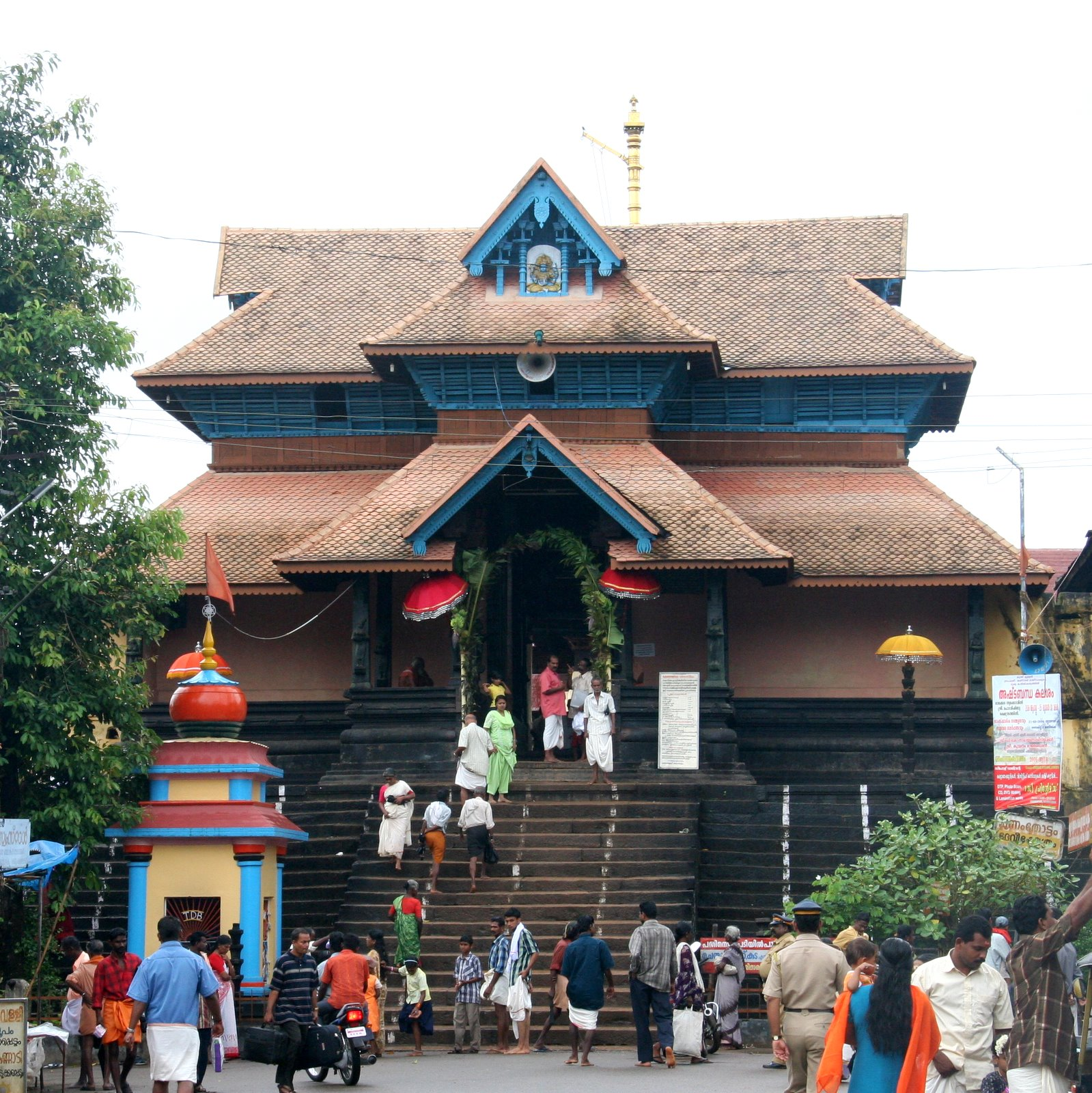

- Parthasarathy Temple, Aranmula, Pathanamthitta Kerala

Religion
- Affiliation: Hinduism
- District: Pathanamthitta
- Deity: Parthasarathy (Krishna)
- Festival: Aranmula Boat Race

Location
- Location: Aranmula
- State: Kerala
- Country: India
- Coordinates: 9°19′41.2″N 76°41′16.4″E

Architecture
- Type: Tamil architecture

Specifications
- Temple: One
- Elevation: 36.8 m (121 ft)

The Aranmula Parthasarathy Temple is a Hindu temple located in Aranmula, a village in Pathanamthitta District, Kerala, South India, on the southern bank of Pamba river, the third longest river in Kerala. It is dedicated to the Lord Krishna, who is worshipped as Parthasarathy (Arjuna's charioteer). Constructed in the Kerala style of architecture, it is one of the "Divya Desams", the 108 temples of Vishnu revered by the Alvar saints.

It is one of the most important Krishna temples in Kerala and is one of the five ancient shrines in Kerala, connected with the legend of the Mahabharata, where the five Pandavas are believed to have built one temple each; Aranmula is built by the Pandava prince Arjuna.

The sacred jewels, called Thiruvabharanam of Ayyappan are taken in procession to Sabarimala each year from Pandalam, and Aranmula Temple is one of the stops on the way. Also, the Thanka Anki, golden attire of Ayyappan, donated by the king of Travancore, is stored here and taken to Sabarimala during the Mandala season of late December.

Aranmula is also known for snake boat race held every year during Onam linked to the legends of the Mahabharata. The temple has four towers over its entrances on its outer wall. The Eastern tower is accessed through a flight of 18 steps and the Northern tower entrance flight through 57 steps leads to the Pamba River. The temples has paintings on its walls dating back to early 18th century.

The temple is open from 4 am to 11:00 am and 5 pm to 8 pm and is administered by Travancore Devaswom Board of the Government of Kerala.

== Legend ==
The Aranmula Parthasarathy Temple is one of the five ancient shrines in the Chengannur area of Kerala, connected with the legend of the Hindu epic Mahabharata. Legend has it that the Pandava princes, after crowning Parikshit as king of Hastinapura left on a pilgrimage. On arriving on the banks of Pamba River, each one is believed to have installed a tutelary image of Krishna; Thrichittatt Maha Vishnu Temple by Yudhishthira, Puliyur Mahavishnu Temple by Bheema, Aranmula by Arjuna, Thiruvanvandoor Mahavishnu Temple by Nakula and Thrikodithanam Mahavishnu Temple to Sahadeva. Legend has it that Arjuna built this temple, to expiate for the sin of having killed Karna on the battlefield, against the dharma of killing an unarmed enemy. It is also believed that here, Vishnu revealed the knowledge of creation to the god Brahma, from whom the Madhu-Kaitabha demons stole the Vedas.

The image of the temple was brought here in a raft made of six pieces of bamboo to this site, and hence the name "Aranmula" (six pieces of bamboo). There is another story, which says it was brought in a raft made of seven pieces of bamboo, out of which one got separated at a place 2 km upstream of the current Temple's location on the banks of Pamba. The place is called "Mulavoor Kadavu" meaning "river bank where the bamboo pole came off". There are still descendants of a family of Ayurveda physicians with great lineage by that name Mulavoor residing there. As per other legend, the place derives its name from arin-villai, a land near a river.

As per another legend, during the battle of Kurukshetra, the Kaurava prince Duryodhana had taunted Bhishma of not using his full might in fighting the Pandavas. This taunt by Duryodhana filled Bhishma with rage. Bhishma took a vow to fight with such ferocity the next day that Krishna himself would be forced to break his vow of not using a weapon during the war in order to protect Arjuna. On the ninth day of the battle, the Kauravas reigned supreme under the leadership of Bhishma, when Krishna motivated Arjuna to take initiative and vanquish his foe. Bhishma was unparalleled with the use of celestial weapons in such a manner that Arjuna could not counter the onslaught. Arrows after arrows fired from Bhishma's bow breached the defenses of Arjuna and inflicted wounds to his body by penetrating his armour. The string of Arjuna's bow, the Gandiva was snapped during the battle. Seeing Arjuna's plight, Krishna jumped down in rage, and took up his sudarshana chakra charging towards Bhishma. Bhishma was overfilled with joy and surrendered to Krishna. Meanwhile, Arjuna beseeched Krishna not to kill Bhishma, as it would have been against Krishna's vow to take up arms in his battle. It is believed that it is this image of Krishna that is enshrined here, with the Sudarshana chakra This symbolizes the Lord's act of compassion to both his devotees on either side of the battle. Krishna broke his vow to protect Arjuna and also to fulfill the promise that his ardent devotee Bhishma had made.

Krishna presiding here in the Vishvarupa form is considered as "Annadana Prabhu" (The Lord who provides food) along with other temples like Vaikom Mahadeva Temple and Sabarimala. It is believed that those whose Annaprashana is performed at the Aranmula Parthasarathy temple would never be affected by the pangs of poverty throughout their life.

Aranmula Mirror is also related to the history of this temple. The king of Travancore wanted to donate a crown made of rare metal to the temple and he found a rare combination of copper and lead. It is believed as per the tradition that preparing the metal polished mirror was produced only by a family. In modern times, the College of Fine Arts have started producing it on commercial scale.

== Architecture ==
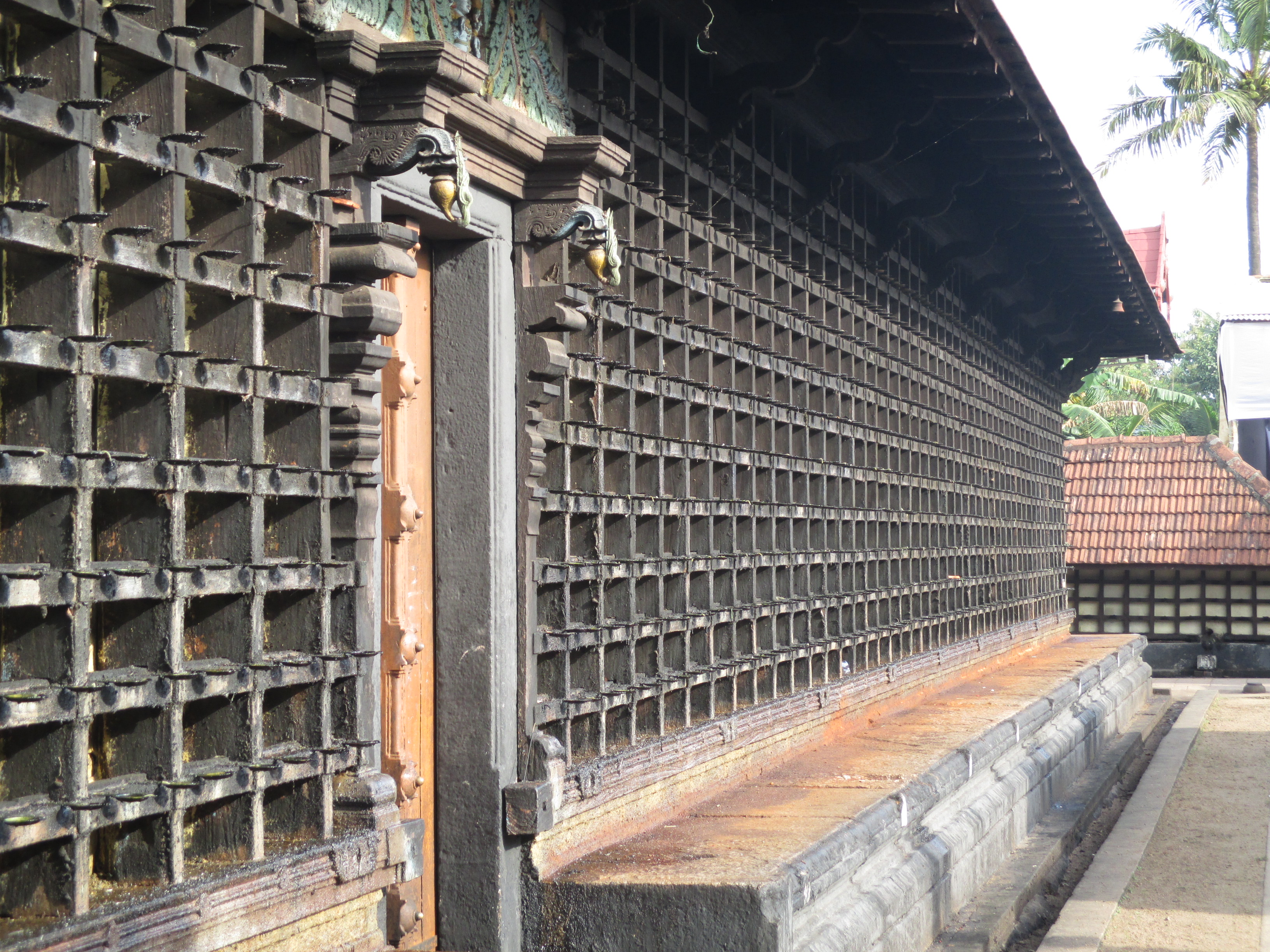
The outer walls around the sanctum housing the structure of lamps, called Vilakkumaadam

The temple is built in Kerala style architecture, which is common in all temples in the South Indian state of Kerala in eastern axis. The temple has an elevated structure reached by a flight of 20 steps. The temple has a two-storeyed gopuram or a gateway tower, with the upper storey having wooden trails covering the Kottupura (a hall of drum beating during festivals). A rectangular wall around the temple, called Kshetra-Madilluka, pierced by the gateways, encloses all the shrines of the temple. The metal plated flagpost or Dwajasthambam is located axial to the temple tower leading to the central sanctum and there is a Deepastamba, which is the light post. Chuttuambalam is the outer pavilion within the temple walls. The central shrine and the associated hall is located in a rectangular structure called Nallambalam, which has pillared halls and corridors. Between the entrance of Nalambalam to the sanctum, there is a raised square platform called Namaskara Mandapam which has a pyramidal roof. Thevrapura, the kitchen used to cook offering to the deity is located on the left of Namaskara Mandapa from the entrance. Balithara is an altar is used for making ritualistic offering to demi-gods and the festive deities. The central shrine called Sreekovil houses the image of the presiding deity, who is a standing four-armed Lord Vishnu worshipped as Parthasarathy. It is on an elevated platform with a single door reached through a flight of five steps. Either sides of the doors have images of guardian deities called Dvarapalakas. As per Kerala rituals, only the main priest called Thantri and the second priest called Melshanthi alone can enter the Sree Kovil. The central shrine has a circular plan with the base built of granite, superstructure built of laterite and conical roof made of terracotta tile supported from inside by a wooden structure. The lower half of Sree Kovil consists of the basement, the pillar or the wall, called stambha or bhithi and the entablature called prasthara in the ratio 1:2:1, in height. Similarly the upper half is divided into the neck called griva, the roof tower called shikhara and the conical kalasam (made of copper) in the same ratio. The roof projects in two levels to protect the inner structure from heavy rains during monsoon. The roof of the temple and some of the pillars have lavish wood and stucco carvings depicting various stories of ancient epics, Ramayana and Mahabharatha. The outer walls around the sanctum have a series of wooden frames housing an array of lamps, which are lit during festive occasions. The temples have paintings on its walls dating back to early 18 century. The image of the presiding deity is 6 ft (1.8 m) tall, making it the tallest among the idols of all Krishna temples in Kerala. Krishna is in Vishvarupa pose, the one he depicted to Arjuna during the Mahabharatha war. It is thus considered to be in fierce form. As per one legend, Arjuna is believed to have built the temple in Nilakal Narayanapuram and later brought to Aranmula in a raft made with six bamboo. In the second precinct, there are shrines of Sastha, Yakshi, Nagaraja and Erangavil Bhagavathy. There is another shrine for Balarama in the lower shrine, considered to be older than the main shrine.

== Aranmula Temple Utsavam ==
The annual Utsavam commences on the Atham Nakshatra in the month of Makara and concludes ten days later on the Thiruvonam day. Garuda Vahanam Ezhunellippu is the main event during this ten day festival. This event falls on the fifth day of the annual festival and is also called Anchaam Purappadu. The deity is taken out from the sanctum sanctorum mounted on Garuda. It is believed that all 33 million Devas (the elements of nature) and Gandharvas would be present in the temple at that time to witness Lord Krishna riding on his vahana, the Garuda.

== Other Festivities ==
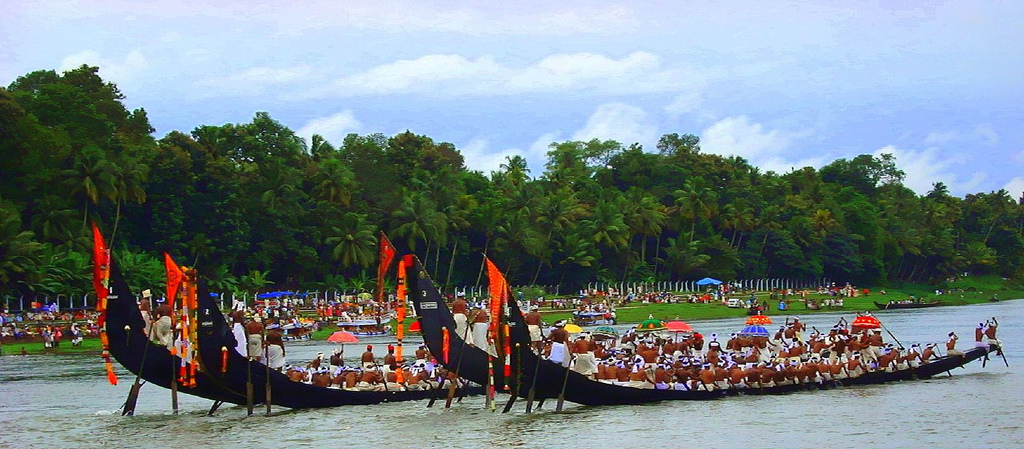
Aranmula Uthrattathi Boat Race

As per Hindu legend in Mahabharata, Arjuna, one of the Pandavas was returning with the image of Krishna after along penance. He faced a huge flood in the Pamba river. A poor low caste Hindu helped him cross the river with a raft made with six bamboos. It is believed that the Aranmula Boat Race is celebrated annually on the Pamba river to commemorate the poor Hindu. The race is held on the last day of the Onam festival when snake boats around 100 ft (30 m) with four helmsmen, 100 rowers and 25 singers participate. The boats move in pairs to the rhythm of music. After the watersport, there is an elaborate feast in the Aranmula temple. The festival is the largest boat race festival held in Kerala and is attended by thousands of visitors. The festival was largely a religious one until 1978, when the Government of Kerala declared it a sports event, but during 2000, the religious festivities were restored.

The Malayalam month of Meenam witnesses a festival where Aranmula Parthasarathy is taken in a grand procession on the Garuda mount to the Pampa river bank, where an image of the Bhagawati from the nearby Punnamthode temple is brought in procession for the Arattu festival.

Another festival celebrated here is the Khandavanadahanam celebrated in the Malayalam month of Dhanus. For this festival, a replica of a forest is created in front of the temple with dried plants, leaves and twigs. This bonfire is lit, symbolic of the Khandavana forest fire of the Mahabharata.

The heads of three Brahmin households in Aranmula and nearby Nedumprayar follow a tradition of fasting on Thiruvonam. The tradition reportedly dates back to more than two centuries. It is believed that once a Brahmin made a vow to feed one pilgrim every day. Pleased with his devotion, the presiding deity appeared to him. From then on, the Brahmin was overjoyed and he made it a custom to feed to conduct a feast every year, which is practised in modern times. The feast is conducted after the boat race.

== Religious importance ==
The temple is revered in Nalayira Divya Prabandham, the 7th–9th century Vaishnavite saint from Tamil Nadu, Nammalvar in one Tamil hymn. The temple is classified as a Divyadesam, one of the 108 Vishnu temples. Thirumangai Alvar have sung in praise of the deity in this temple with eleven hymns. Thulabaram, the practice of weighing oneself against material and donating it to the temple is practiced here. The Vanni tree in the temple is believed to have medicinal values. The fruits of the Vanni tree are also weighed in Thulabaram and also used for curing diseases of the devotees. It is the place where Brahma is believed to have worshiped Vishnu to retrieve the Vedas from the two demons named Madhu and Kaitibha. The image of Parthasarathy is believed to have been installed by Arjuna himself. The temple is used to store the jewels of the Sabarimala temple.

== Temple administration ==
The temple is open from 4 am to 11:00 am and 5 pm to 8 pm and is administered by Travancore Devaswom Board of the Government of Kerala. The king of Travancore maintained the golden dress in the temple, offered to Sabarimala Ayyapan Temple. The practise of offering the golden dress to Sabarimala temple annually is done by the board.

== See also ==
- Temples of Kerala
- Aranmula kottaram
- Anikkattilammakshethram
