= Thrikodithanam Mahavishnu Temple =

Vishnu temple in Thrikodithanam

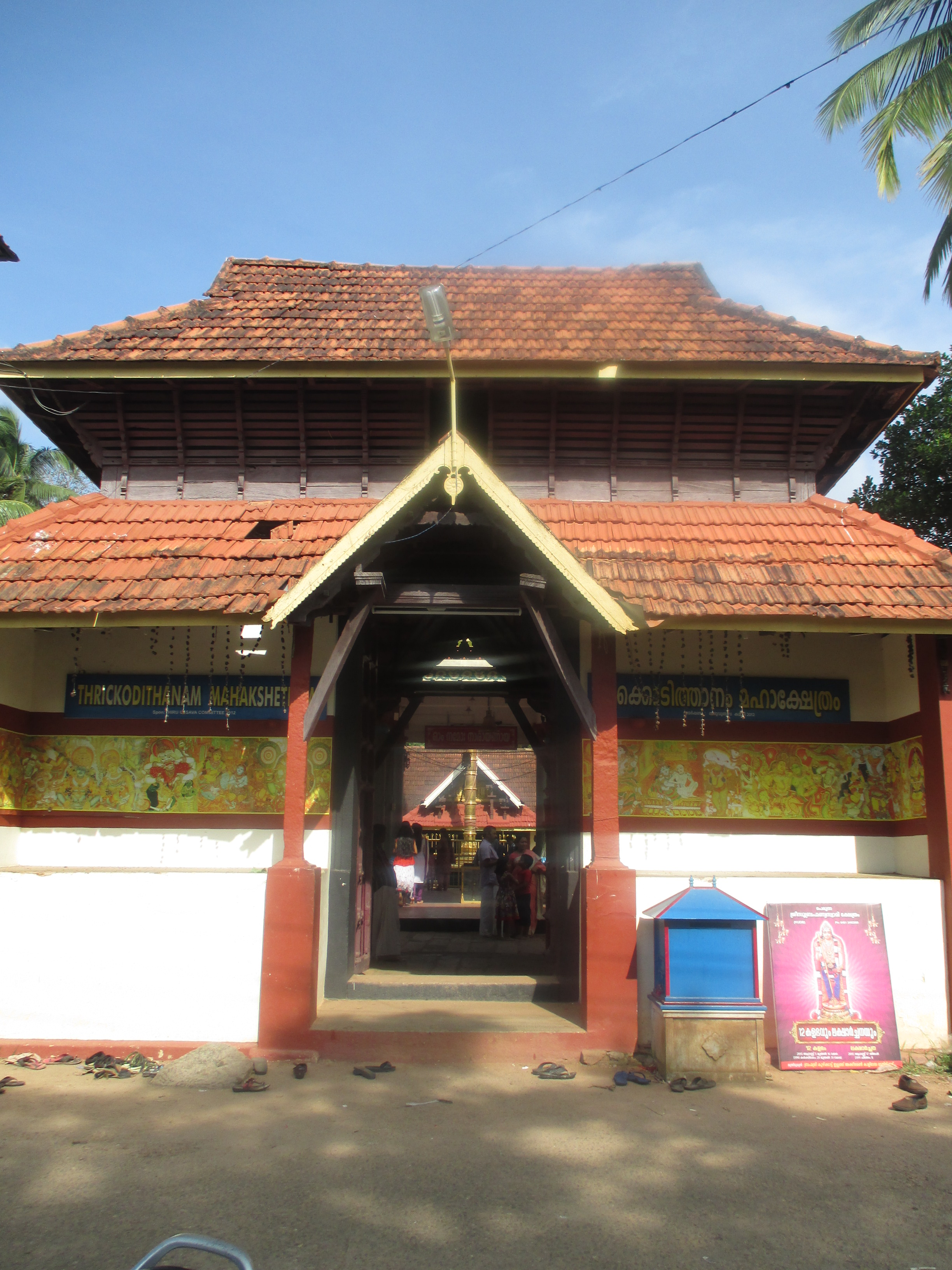

- Location in Kerala

Religion
- Affiliation: Hinduism
- District: Kottayam
- Deity: Mahavishnu

Location
- Location: Kerala, India
- State: Kerala
- Country: India
- Interactive map of Thrikodithanam Mahavishnu Temple
- Coordinates: 9.438092°N 76.561998°E

Architecture
- Type: Kerala architecture

Website
- http://www.thrikodithanamtemple.com/

Thrikodithanam Mahavishnu Temple is a Hindu temple dedicated to Vishnu and located in Thrikkodithanam, Kottayam District, Kerala, South India. Constructed in the Kerala style of architecture, the temple is glorified in the Nalayira Divya Prabandham, the early medieval Tamil canon of the Alvar saints from the 6th–9th centuries CE. It is one of the 108 Divya Desam dedicated to Krishna, an avatar of Vishnu, who is worshipped as Mahavishnu. The nearest railway station to the temple is located in Changanassery, while the nearest airport is Cochin International Airport.

It is one of the five ancient shrines in the Kottayam-Alappuzha-Pathanamthitta area of Kerala, connected with the legend of Mahabharata, where the five Pandavas are believed to have built one temple each; Thrichittatt Maha Vishnu Temple by Yudhishthira, Puliyur Mahavishnu Temple by Bheema, Aranmula Parthasarathy Temple by Arjuna, Thiruvanvandoor Mahavishnu Temple by Nakula and Thrikodithanam Mahavishnu Temple by Sahadeva. The temple is open from 4:00 am to 11:00 am and 5:00 pm to 8:00 pm and is administered by Travancore Devaswom Board of the Government of Kerala.

== Legend ==
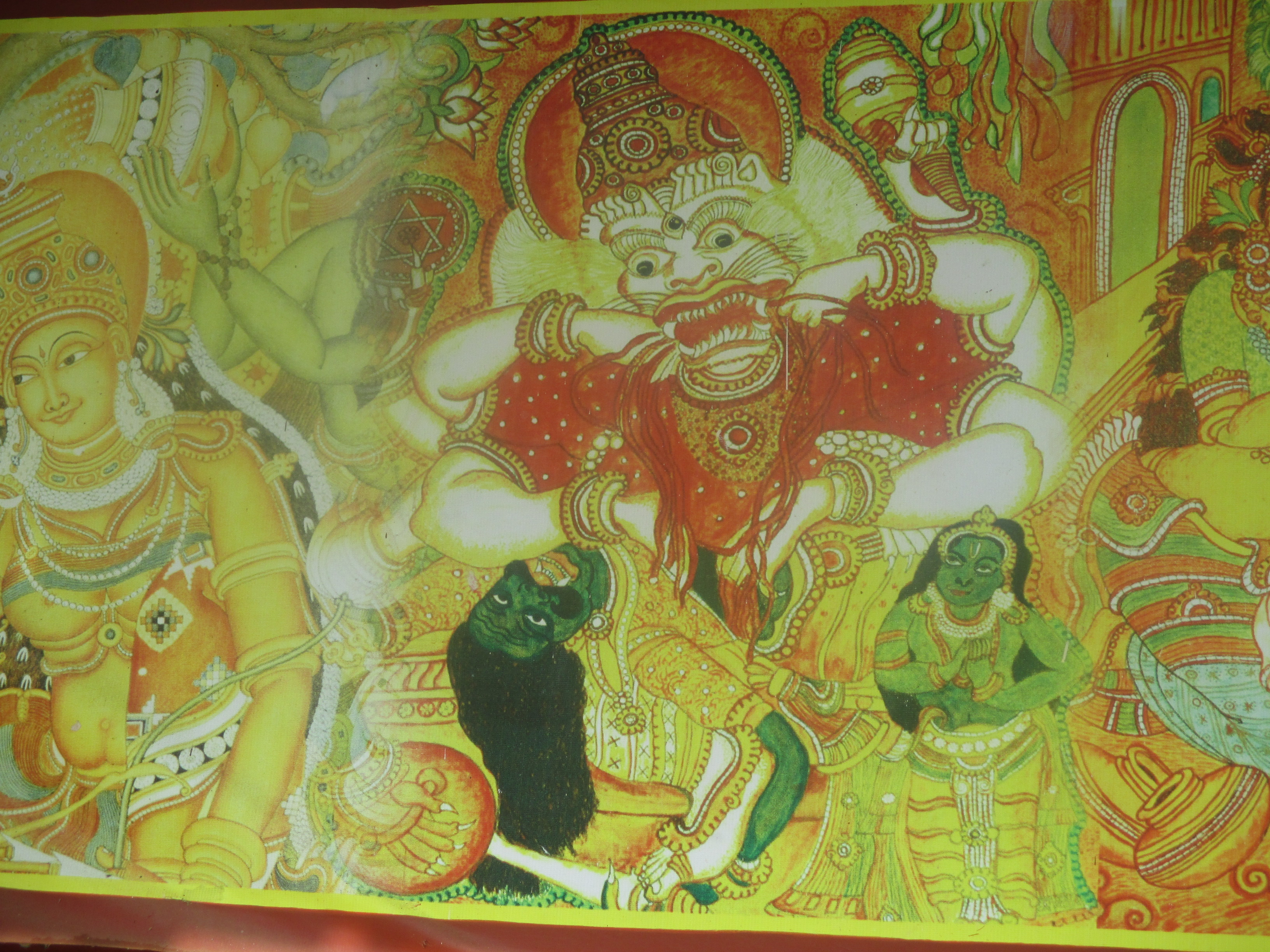
Painting on the walls of the outer gopuram of the temple. These particular paintings do not exist now (as of 2024).

It is one of the five ancient shrines around the Chengannur area of Kerala, connected with the legend of Mahabharata. Legend has it that the Pandava princes, after crowning Parikshit as king of Hastinapura left on a pilgrimage. On arriving on the banks of river Pamba, each one is believed to have installed a tutelary image of Krishna; Thrichittatt Maha Vishnu Temple by Yudhishthira, Puliyur Mahavishnu Temple by Bheema, Aranmula Parthasarathy Temple by Arjuna, Thiruvanvandoor Mahavishnu Temple by Nakula and Thrikodithanam Mahavishnu Temple by Sahadeva.

The Divya Kshetram was built by Sahadeva of Pandavas. King Rukmangatha of Surya Vamsa undertook Ekadasi Vratham and gifted all his punyas to Devas by which he reached Devaloka. There are also shrines for Krishna and Narasimha. Another legend is that temple servant being cursed by the deity to turn into a stone as he delayed the opening of the temple doors making the devotees to wait for darshana. The statue of the servant can be seen in front of the temple. A monthly Sravana Deepams (festival of light) is performed.

== Architecture ==
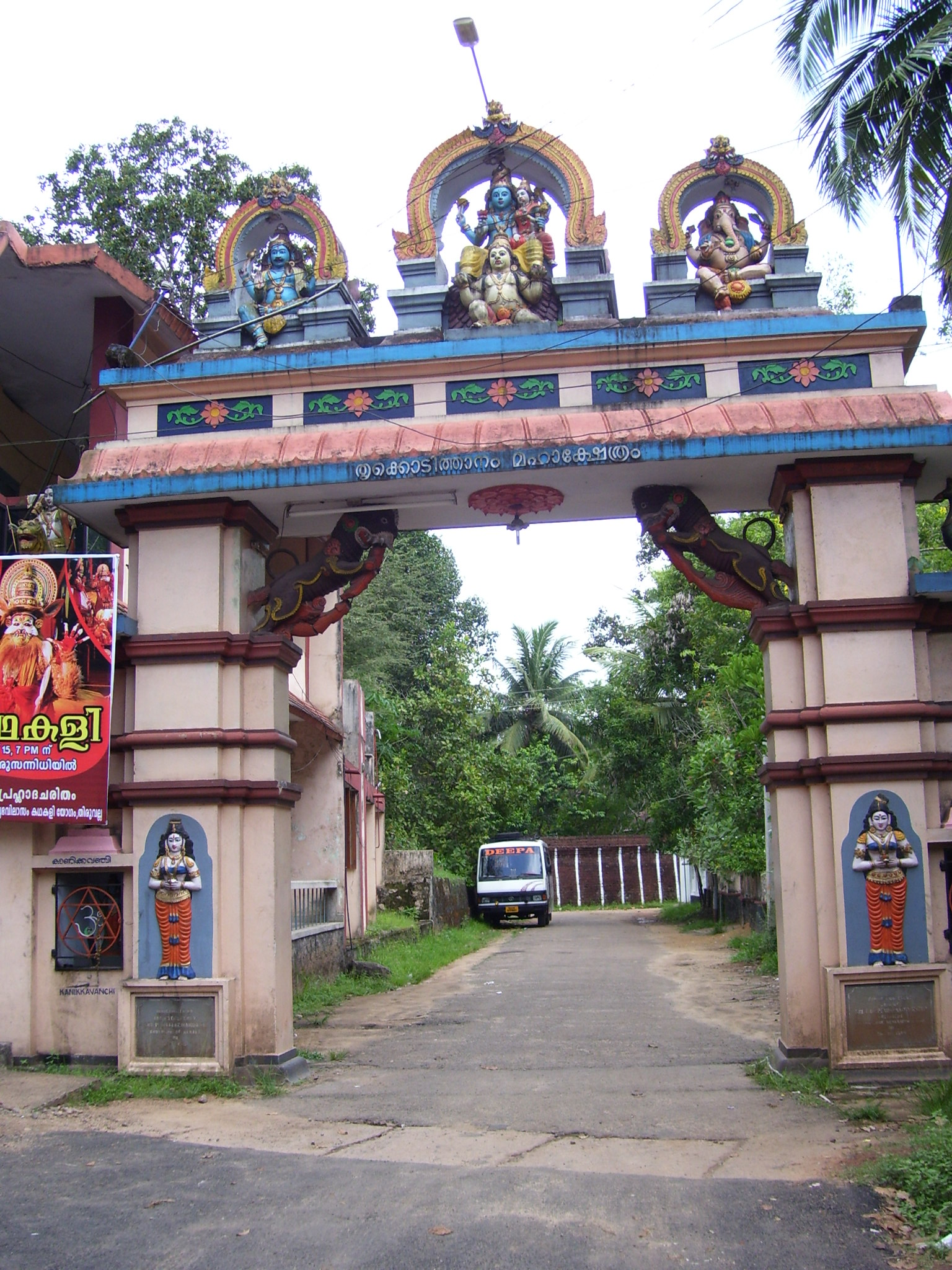
The Temple Entrance

The presiding deity in the temple is Athpudha Narayanan, who is also named as "Amirutha Narayanan". The presiding deity is sported in standing posture facing the east direction. His consort is Karpagavalli. The temple is built in Kerala style architecture. The temple has a two storeyed gopuram or a gateway tower, with the upper storey having wooden trails covering the Kottupura, the hall of drum beating during festivals. A rectangular wall around the temple, called Kshetra-Madilluka pierced by the gateways, encloses all the shrines of the temple. The metal plated flagpost or dvajasthambam and the Deepastamba, the light post, are located axial to the temple tower leading to the sanctum. Chuttuambalam is the outer pavilion located within the temple walls. The sanctum and the associated hall is located in a rectangular structure called Nallambalam that has pillared halls and corridors.

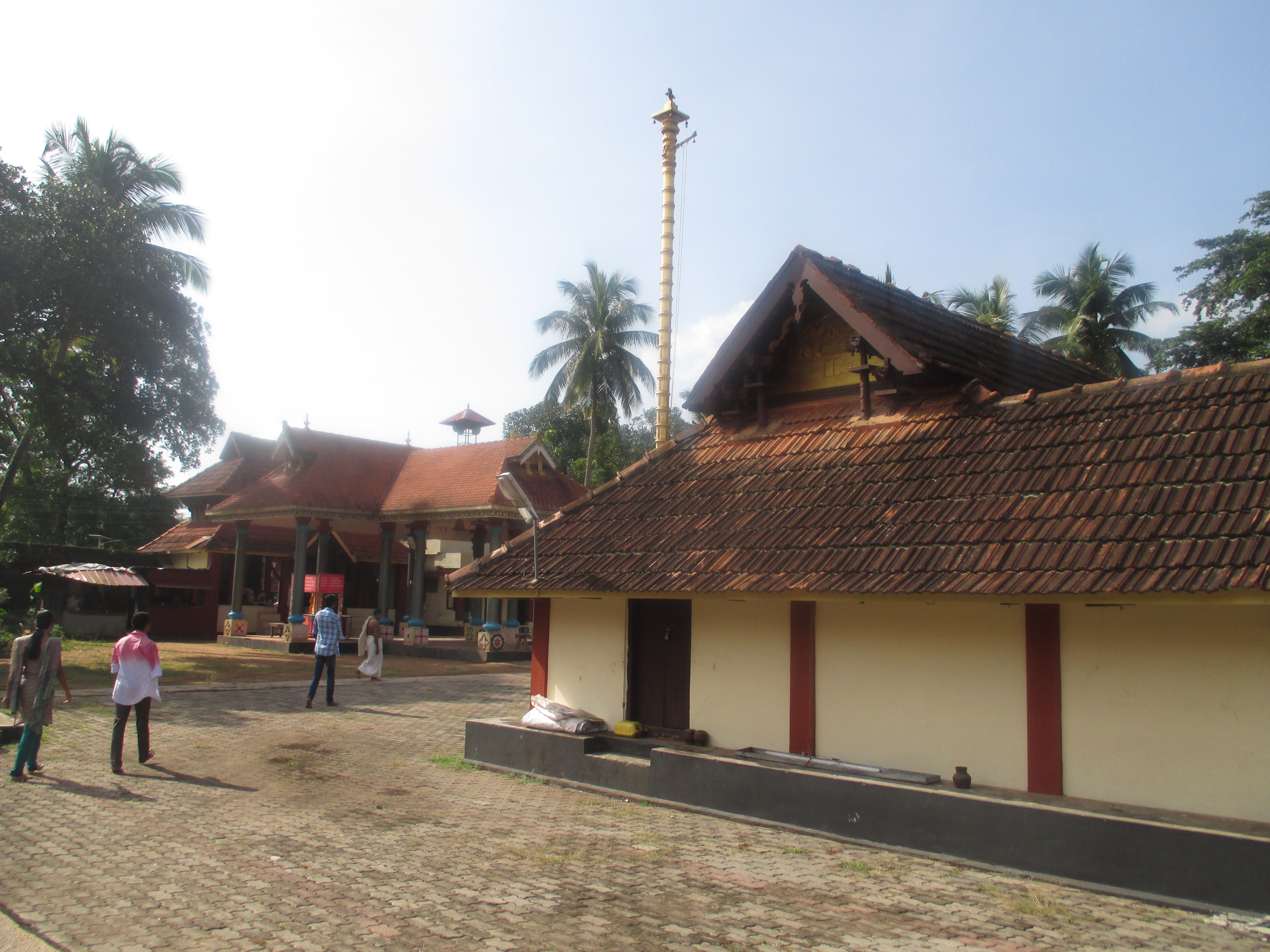
The shrines in the temple

Between the entrance of Nallambalam to the sanctum, there is a raised square platform called Namaskara Mandapa (altar) which has a pyramidal roof. Thevrapura, the kitchen used to cook offering to the deity is located on the left of Namaskara Mandapa from the entrance. Balithara is an altar is used for making ritualistic offering to demi-gods and the festive deities. The sanctum called Sreekovil, houses the image of the presiding deity. It is on an elevated platform with a single door reached through a flight of five steps. Either sides of the doors have images of guardian deities called Dvarapalakas. As per Kerala rituals, only the main priest called Thantri and the second priest called Melshanthi alone can enter the Sree Kovil. The central shrine has a circular plan with the base built of granite, superstructure built of laterite and conical roof made of terracotta tile supported from inside by a wooden structure. The lower half of Sree Kovil consists of the basement, the pillar or the wall, called stambha or bhithi and the entablature called prasthara in the ratio 1:2:1, in height. Similarly the upper half is divided into the neck called griva, the roof tower called shikhara and the finial kalasam (made of copper) in the same ratio. The roof projects in two levels to protect the inner structure from heavy rains during monsoon. The roof of the temple and some of the pillars have lavish wood and stucco carvings depicting various stories of ancient epics, Ramayana and Mahabharatha. The outer walls around the sanctum have a series of wooden frames housing an array of lamps, which are lit during festive occasions. The temples has paintings on its walls dating back to early 18 century. The image of the presiding deity is 6 ft (1.8 m) tall. Krishna is in Vishvarupa pose, the one he depicted to Arjuna during the Mahabharatha war. In the second precinct, there are shrines of Sastha, Yakshi, Nagaraja and Erangavil Bhagavathy Balarama in the lower shrine. The temple tank named Bhoomi Theertham is located opposite to the temple. The Vimanam, the roof the sanctum is called Punniya koti Vimaanam.

== Kazhuvetti Kallu ==
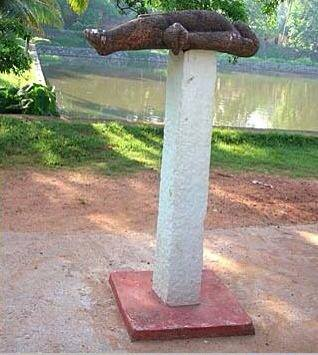
Kazhuvetti Kallu at the Thrikodithanam Mahavishnu temple complex

Between the pond and the eastern entrance, near a public platform for arts and discourses, is a strange granite statue. It is a man flat on his back, held up stiff and straight on a stone pillar about six feet high. Only his waist rests on the pillar, rest of the body is unsupported. He holds a shankhu (conch shell) in his left hand and wears the sacred thread indicative of the Brahmin castes. At one time the statue wore a crown as well. The idol is a stern reminder that bribery, cheating and dishonesty cannot be tolerated. Anybody who goes after these evils will be met with the capital punishment, such as, that met with the man lying on the stone. Common folklore about this stone idol has a story of jealousy, indiscretion and swift retribution.

The ruler of Chembakaserry kingdom was a renowned Nambuthiri Brahmin who took pride in the prosperity of his own kingdom and Sri Krishna temple. Since temples were then considered keystones to a kingdom's spiritual and temporal well-being, the King decided to embarrass the rulers of Nanrulainattu (capital-Thrikodithanam) by making a deliberate, untimely visit to the famous Vishnu Temple. He arrived in Thrikodithanam after the Seiveli puja (the last ceremony of the day) and after the temple had closed. It is considered very inauspicious to open a temple after the gods are put to rest, but still, the King forced an entry by bribing a caretaker. When the rulers of Nanrulainattu discovered this indiscretion, they were furious. The caretaker was beheaded and, soon, the Chambakaserry king too fell ill and died. So this stone figure was installed near the temple entrance to deter any future offenders and to remind everybody of the consequences of disturbing the gods. Another version of the story lays the blame on the king of Ambalapuzha for this surreptitious darshana.

== Religious importance ==
Arputha Narayana temple is revered in Nalayira Divya Prabhandam, the 7th–9th century Vaishnava canon, by Nammalvar. The temple is classified as a Divya Desam, one of the 108 Vishnu temples that are mentioned in the book. The temple is also believed to be the place where Kutakkuttu, a dance form where ladies hold an umbrella while dancing is practiced during worship.

The temple is under the administration of the Travancore Devaswom Board.
