= Kalarickal =

Kalarickal is a surname of Indian origin. Notable people with the surname include:

- K. P. Joseph Kalarickal (born 1930), Indian novelist, poet and biographer
- Mathew Kalarickal (1948–2025), Indian cardiologist

== See also ==
- Kalarickal Manikanda Swami Temple, an ancient temple in Kottayam District, Kerala, India
