= Kalarickal Manikanda Swami Temple =

- Kalarickal Manikanda Swami Temple, Changanassery, Kottayam, Kerala

Religion
- Affiliation: Hinduism
- District: Kottayam
- Deity: Lord Shiva
- Festival: Maha Shivaratri

Location
- Location: Changanassery
- State: Kerala
- Country: India
- Interactive map of Kalarickal Manikanda Swami Temple
- Coordinates: 9°27′01.0″N 76°33′49.8″E

Architecture
- Type: Architecture of Kerala

Specifications
- Temple: One
- Elevation: 30.44 m (100 ft)

Kalarickal Manikanda Swami temple is an ancient temple in Thrikkodithanam village in Kottayam District, Kerala, India.

Lord Siva is the main prathista (idol). The tomb of Kalarickal Gurunathan is also present in the temple. It is said that Karikal Gurunathan was a kalari (traditional kerala martial arts) expert and helped the king of Thrikkodithanam. It is believed that Gurunthan's birthplace is Edappali, Kochi.

Temple renovation is in progress and it attracts many devotees.

== See also ==
- Temples of Kerala
- Thrikodithanam Mahavishnu Temple
