= Muthumariamman Temple, Tiruvappur =

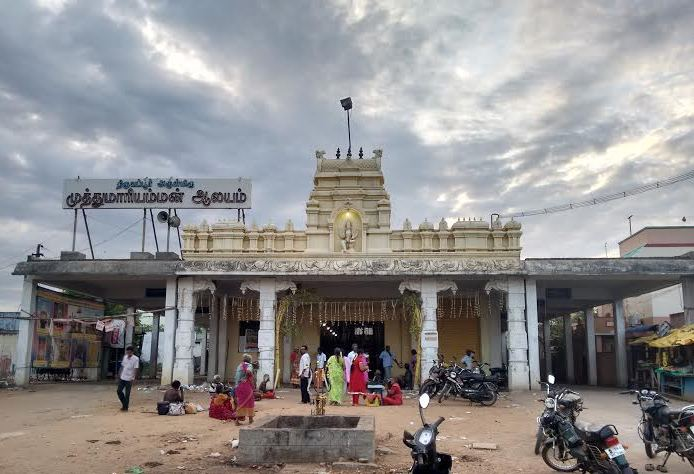
Temple entrance

Muthumariamman Temple is situated at Tiruvappur in Thirukokarnam, at a distance of 5 kilometres from Pudukkottai in Tamil Nadu, India.

== Structure ==
The presiding deity, Muthumariamman, is found in sitting posture. The temple has front mandapa followed by Dwajasthambam, bali peetam and sanctum sanctorum. In the prakara, Meenakshi of Madurai and Kamatchi of Kanchipuram are found.

== Festivals ==
Aadi Fridays are famous in this temple. During Tamil month of Masi showering of flowers and car festival are held. In the Sundays of Tamil month of Avani special worship is held.

== Worship time ==
The temple is opened for worship from 6.00 to 10.00 a.m. and 5.00 to 8.00 p.m.
