= Chanjody =

- Village
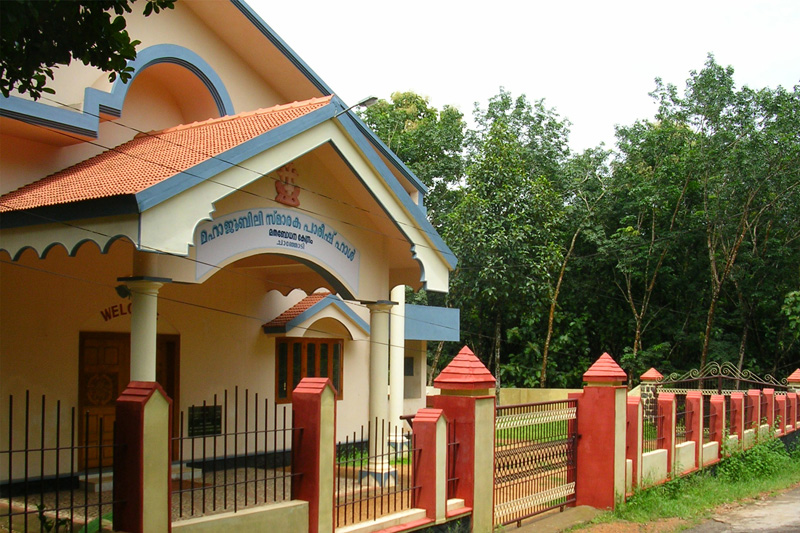
- Parish Hall
- Interactive map of Chanjody
- Coordinates: 9.445464°N 76.591477°E
- Country: India
- State: Kerala
- District: Kottayam

Languages
  - Official: Malayalam, English
- Time zone: UTC+5:30 (IST)
- PIN: 686
- Telephone code: 91 481
- Vehicle registration: KL-33

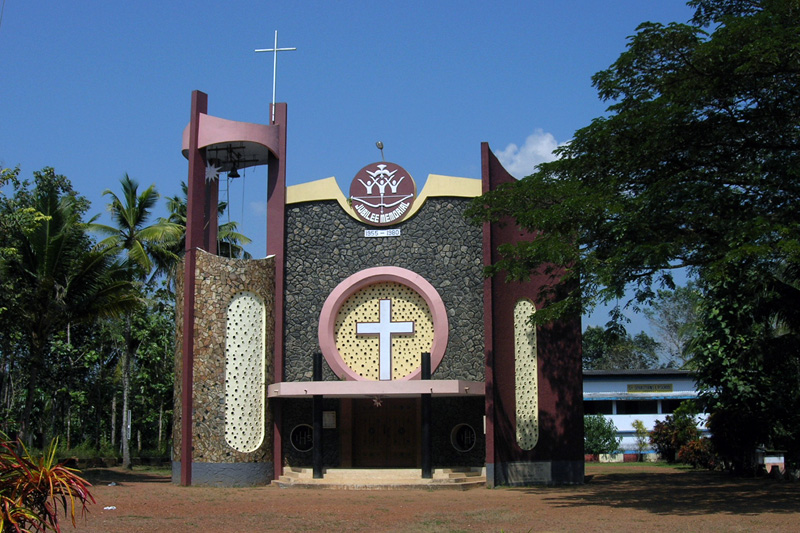
St Sebastian's Church

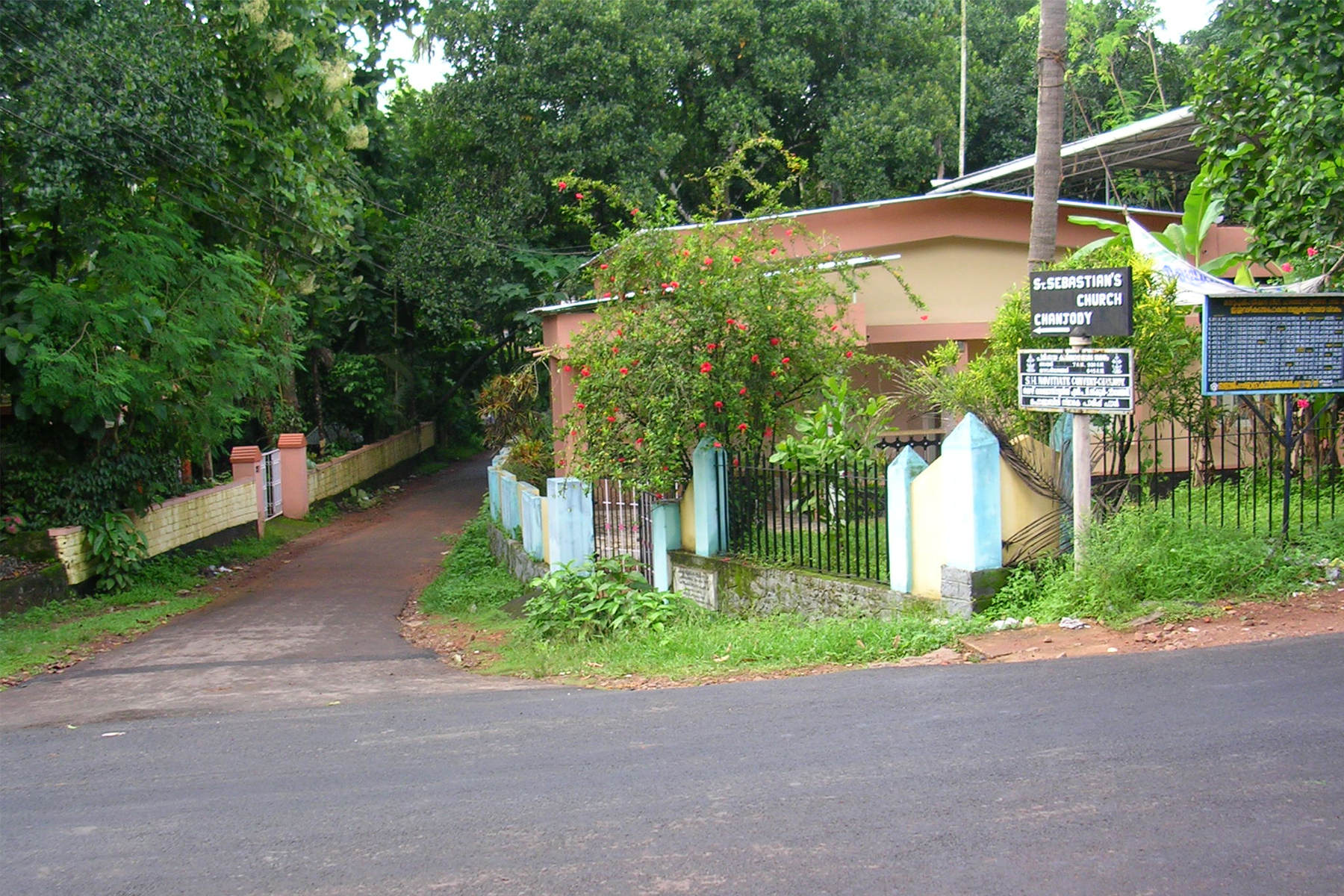
Chanjody Junction

Chanjody is a small village in Changanassery Taluk in the Kottayam district, Kerala, India. A small part of Chanjody comes under Pathanamthitta District under Thiruvalla Revenue Division.

Administered through the Thrikodithanam panchayat, a small part of the village forms part of the district of Pathanamthitta under Thiruvalla Constituency & Thiruvalla Revenue Division .It is known for its bright coloured houses, beautiful gardens and the three sisters.

== Demographics ==
The population is mainly middle class Indian sub urban people with a literacy proximate to 100 percent. A large part of the population are followers of the Syro-Malabar Catholic Church, with sects of Hinduism and Christianity also present.

The basic infrastructure of the village is well developed and the nearest towns - Changanassery and Tiruvalla are just 7 kilometers apart.

== Landmarks ==
The major landmarks of this place include St: Sebastian's Church, the parish Hall and St: Sebastian's Lower Primary School.
