= 2025 Sabarimala gold row =

Alleged misappropriation of temple gold

- Date: September 2025 – present
- Location: Sabarimala (Pathanamthitta district), Kerala, India
- Cause: Alleged irregularities and discrepancies relating to gold-plated temple artefacts during replating/repair work (2019 and 2025)
- Participants: Travancore Devaswom Board; Kerala High Court (Devaswom Bench), Kerala Police Special Investigation Team (SIT); Enforcement Directorate (money-laundering probe)
- Outcome: Court-monitored investigation ongoing; multiple FIRs registered; arrests and further probes reported

The 2025 Sabarimala gold row is a controversy and ongoing set of investigations concerning alleged irregularities and the reported misappropriation of gold associated with gold-clad temple artefacts at the Sabarimala Ayyappa temple in Kerala, India. The matter drew public attention in September 2025 after the Special Commissioner for Sabarimala informed the Kerala High Court that gold cladding from temple artefacts had been removed for renovation without prior intimation, prompting judicial scrutiny and subsequent court-monitored investigations. The case involves alleged irregularities connected to gold-clad panels/plates associated with the Dwarapalaka (guardian deity) idols and with door-frame components of the Sreekovil (sanctum sanctorum).

In October 2025, the Kerala High Court ordered a court-monitored probe by a Special Investigation Team (SIT) and directed further inquiries into discrepancies reported in relation to earlier replating work in 2019.The High Court noted a significant weight discrepancy (reported as about 4.54 kg) between the time certain gold-clad plates were removed and when they were produced before a firm for replating work in 2019, and questioned why the temple’s administering body did not report it at the time.

The investigation continued into 2026, with media reporting arrests, bail orders for some accused, and an Enforcement Directorate (ED) money-laundering probe involving searches across multiple states. For example, the ED reported searches in Kerala, Tamil Nadu and Karnataka in connection with alleged proceeds of crime, and later reported attachment/freezing of assets of the prime accused under provisions of the Prevention of Money Laundering Act (PMLA).

== Background ==
The Sabarimala temple is managed by the Travancore Devaswom Board. The gold cladding on certain prominent temple components dates to sponsorship-linked works in the late 1990s, and later replating/repair work in 2019 involved removing gold-clad components and sending them for processing. In 2025, the Kerala High Court examined documentation relating to these works and raised concerns about record-keeping and chain of custody for valuable temple assets. Media reports described the High Court’s concern that items were recorded in official documents as “copper plates” despite their gold cladding, and that weight/quantity discrepancies were not adequately accounted for.

== Emergence of the controversy in 2025 ==
On 10 September 2025, the Special Commissioner for Sabarimala reported to the Kerala High Court that gold cladding from the Dwarapalakas and associated components had been removed on 7 September 2025 for renovation without advance intimation to his office. The High Court initiated proceedings (suo motu) and examined earlier documentation associated with similar repair work in 2019.

On 17 September 2025, the High Court ordered a probe into allegedly missing gold linked to the Dwarapalaka idol components. On 18 September 2025, the High Court expressed concern over a discrepancy of around 4.54 kg based on a weight drop between removal and production before a replating firm during the 2019 work.

== Court-monitored SIT probe ==
On 6 October 2025, the Kerala High Court ordered a court-monitored probe by a Special Investigation Team (SIT), reported as headed by ADGP (Law and Order) H. Venkatesh, to investigate all aspects of the alleged loss/disappearance of gold and to examine the chain of custody, audit records, and potential criminal liability.

== Arrests and proceedings ==
Unnikrishnan Potti, a priest and businessman and Kandararu Rajeevaru (a member of the Tantri family serving as a chief priest by rotation) were arrested in connection with the case.

== Enforcement Directorate probe ==
In January 2026, the ED conducted raids/searches across Kerala, Tamil Nadu and Karnataka as part of a money-laundering probe linked to the alleged misappropriation of gold and related assets. The ED later froze immovable properties valued at approximately ₹1.3 crore belonging to Unnikrishnan Potty, stating that attachments were made under PMLA provisions.

== Reactions ==
The matter triggered political debate in Kerala. In December 2025, the BJP state president Rajeev Chandrasekhar filed a petition seeking a CBI probe, and that the High Court issued notices to the state government, CBI, the Travancore Devaswom Board and other respondents.
