= Puliyoor =

- Village
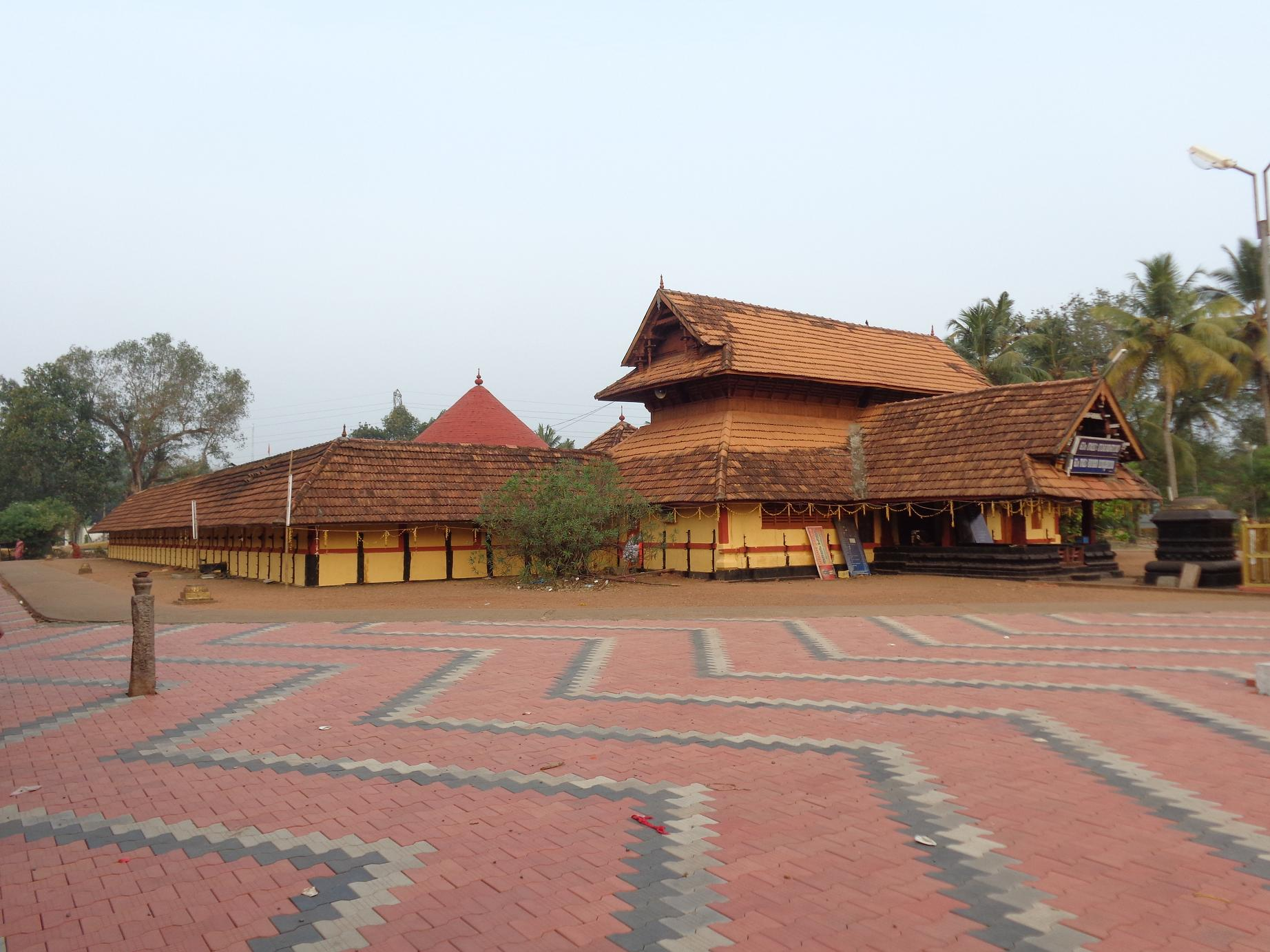
- Puliyoor temple
- Interactive map of Puliyoor
- Coordinates: 9°18′0″N 76°35′0″E
- Country: India
- State: Kerala
- District: Alappuzha

Population (2011)
  - Total: 16,531

Languages
  - Official: Malayalam, English
- Time zone: UTC+5:30 (IST)
- PIN: 689510
- Vehicle registration: KL

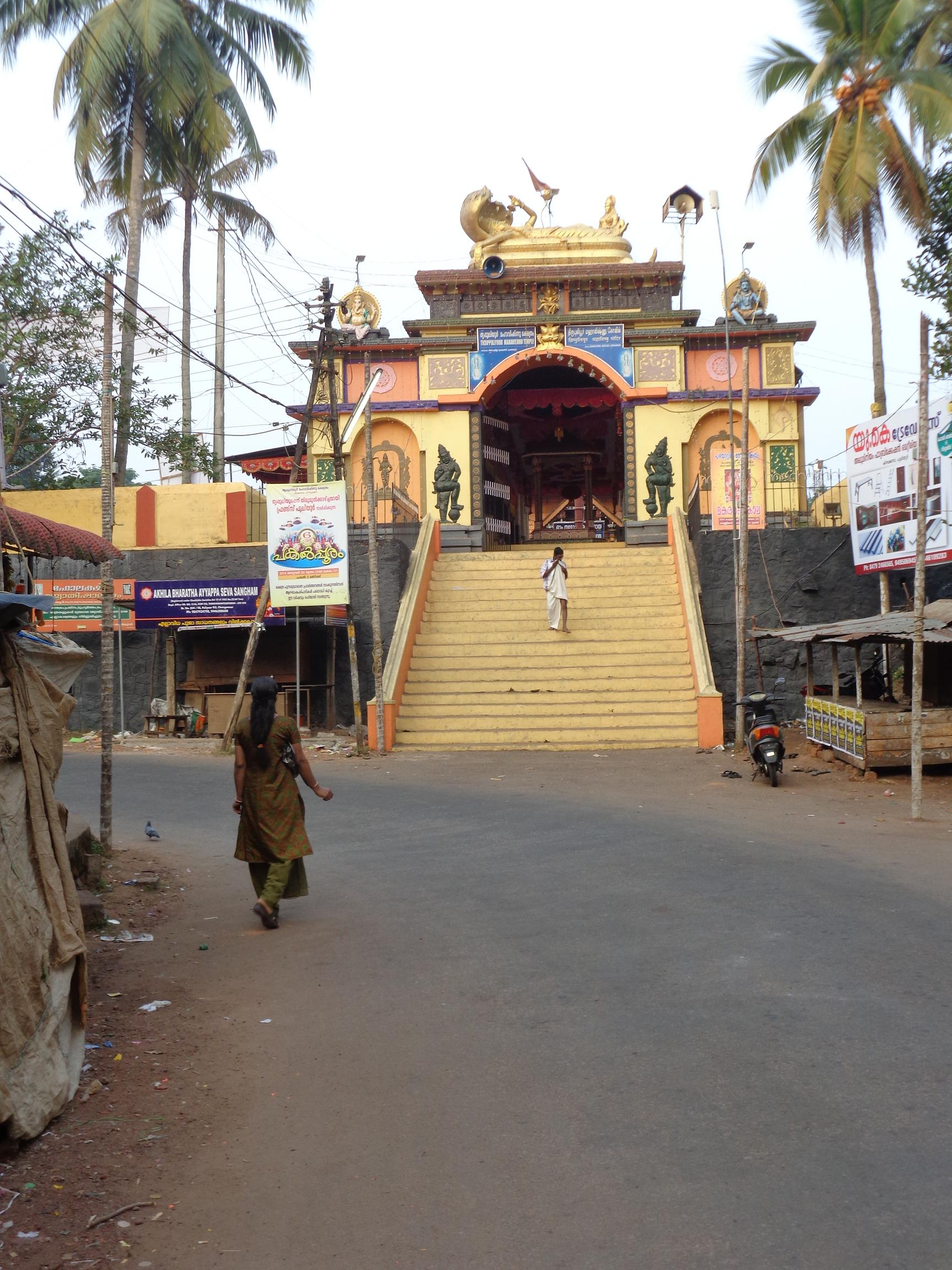
Temple gate of puliyoor mahavishnu temple

Puliyoor is a village in Chengannur municipality in Alappuzha district in the Indian state of Kerala.

The schools in the village include Government HS Puliyoor, Govt. U.P. School Perissery, Vallikkav LP School and Snehagiri U.P. School. Government UP School was the first established school in the area and is over 100 years old. The Great flood of 99 provided the timber for today's school building.

Thrippuliyoor Mahavishnukshethram (Puliyoor Temple) is the famous temple here which is mentioned in Thirukkural and Alvar scripts and is a main attraction. It is one of the 108 Vaishnava temples (Divya Desam) and is believed to be established before 6th century CE.

Today, many social associations and cultural clubs, libraries, temples and churches strengthen the culture of the region.

== Etymology ==
It is widely believed that the name Puliyoor came from the phrase "puliye kanda ooru" meaning "Land where the leopard was spotted".

== History ==
In ancient times, Puliyoor was an abode of Buddhist believers. Non Hindus were welcomed in this village since ancient times and the region was a good example of religious harmony even having a Christian serving as the temple administrator. Many of the places in the region were isolated islands in the ancient times but today they are all well connected by roads.

Pandavanpara (rock of the Pandavas of Mahabharatha) of Chengannur is nearby with a temple at the hilltop and is believed to have been a hideout for the pandavas during their exile and is famed for having the footsteps of Bhima. The region around Pandavanpara has various temples dedicated to each pandava.

== Temples ==
Thrppuliyoor temple was established even before the sixth century. It is one of the most important Vaishnavite temples of India and is one of the 108 (Divya Desam). Velakali is an important festival of Puliyooor and it is the only region in central travancore where this artform is prevalent today.

== Geography ==
The highest point of the village is called Nootavanpara.

== Demographics ==
As of 2011 India census, Puliyoor had a population of 16531 with 7586 males and 8945 females.

== Economy ==
Agriculture was a main profession of the people many years back. A small section of the people are now employed in cottage industries. The main crops are coconut, rubber, cassava, rice and banana. Vegetables are also cultivated.

== Schools ==
- Government UP School
- Puliyoor Higher secondary school
- J.B.School
- M M SKV

== See also ==
- Puliyoor Mahavishnu Temple
