= K. P. Joseph Kalarickal =

Indian writer

K.P Joseph Kalarickal
- Born: Kerala
- Education: University of Kerala
- Occupation: Novelist
- Children: Francis Kalarickal, Jerry George Kalarickal, Anna Anthony
- Writing career
- Genre: Biography
- Website: www.kpjoseph.com

K.P Joseph Kalarickal is an Indian writer of books such as Gospel of Guru Sree Narayana, Notes on the era and other poems, Hormis: legend of a great banker with passion for development: biography of K.P. Hormis, founder of Federal Bank, Bishop Jonas Thaliath of Rajkot: a biography.

He was born in the temple town of Aluva on 5 March 1930 in an orthodox Christian family and many of his books are derived from his personal experiences. An MA graduate from the University of Kerala, he has worked as a Consultant FAO of the United Nations. He also worked for Cochin Shipyard and retired as Chief Manager Finance and Management Services.

== Bibliography ==
- Gospel of Guru Sree Narayana
- Hormis: legend of a great banker with passion for development : biography of K.P. Hormis, founder of Federal Bank
- Notes on the era and other poems
