= Thrikkodithanam =

- village
- Location in Kerala, India Thrikkodithanam (India)
- Coordinates: 9°26′10″N 76°34′0″E
- Country: India
- State: Kerala
- District: Kottayam

Population (2011)
  - Total: 33,819

Languages
  - Official: Malayalam, English
- Time zone: UTC+5:30 (IST)
- PIN: 686105
- Vehicle registration: KL-33

Thrikkodithanam is a village in Kottayam district in the state of Kerala, India. It is located on the outskirts of Changanassery Municipality.

The area of the villages is 9.5 km^{2}. The local administrative body is called the Panchayat and is one of seven in Madapally Block.

== Demographics ==
As of 2011 Thrikkodithanam had a population of 33,819 according to the India census: 16,504 males and 17,315 females.

== Sri Murugan Temple ==
Sri Murugan temple is situated next to Thrikodithanam Mahavishnu Temple. Most devotees visiting the Thrikodithanam Mahavishnu Temple also happen to visit the Sri Murugan temple.

== Temple Pond ==
There is a beautiful and sacred pond near the main entrance of Thrikodithanam Mahavishnu Temple, i.e. Eastern Gate. Between the pond and the entrance there a strange granite statue known as Kazhivetti kallu. The 10-day annual festival is celebrated during the lunar month of Vrishchigom (November–December). The major highlight of the festival commences after dusk on the 9th day and carries on until the early hours of the following morning. It is a huge display of 1001 flares made of cloth bundles dipped in oil and placed on a pyramidal structure.
