= Travancore Devaswom Board =

Kerala statutory board managing temples

- Formation: 1950; 76 years ago
- Type: Autonomous Body
- Headquarters: Thiruvananthapuram
- Location(s): Nanthancode, Kawdiar Post, Thiruvananthapuram 695003, Kerala (EPABX Nos.: 0471-2317983 / 2316963 / 2310921 / 2723240 FAX: 0471-2310192)
- Region served: Kerala
- President: K. Jayakumar
- Member 1: K. Raju
- Member 2: Adv. P D Santhosh Kumar
- Devaswom Secretary: P N Ganeswaran Potti
- Key people: K. Muraleedharan, Minister for Devaswoms, Government of Kerala
- Website: travancoredevaswomboard.org

The Travancore Devaswom Board, headquartered in Thiruvananthapuram (Trivandrum) the capital city of Kerala, is a statutory and autonomous body managing around 1252 temples in the southern part of India. The regular operations of one of the major temples of India, the Sabarimala temple, works under its guidance

== History and Administration ==
Travancore Devaswom Board is an autonomous administrative body created for managing around 1200 temples in South India. The management of one of the famous temples, Sabarimala, is under it.

== Roles and Responsibilities ==
Travancore Devaswom Board is formed with below purpose

- Pilgrim welfare.
- Maintain properties of temple.
- Development of areas in and around temple.
- Welfare of staff working in temples managed by it.
- Purchase of temple ritual items.
- Offering guidelines on sacred Prasadam prepared at temples managed by it.
- Representing temple in court in all legal matters.
- Fire lit during Makaravilakku at ponnambalamedu

== Composition ==
Travancore Devaswom Board is headed by K. Jayakumar

== See also ==
- Devaswom boards in Kerala
- 2025 Sabarimala gold row
