= Thantri =

Vedic religious leader

Thantri or Tantri is the Vedic head who sets the rules in temples of Kerala and in coastal Karnataka in southern India. It is a hereditary position. The thantri installs the murti of the deity called prana pratishtha, and from that moment he assumes the position of the guru of the deity.

Thantris are Shrauta Namboothiri Brahmins who study tantras, and belong to Poorva Mimamsa, one of the 6 schools of thought in Hindu philosophy. Poorva mimamsa deals with the early parts of the Vedas. Another famous school of philosophy is Vedanta also known as Uttara Mimamsa (essence of Vedas). One common misconception about Vedanta is that it mostly deals with the later parts of the Vedas. Vedanta is the essence that enlightens one in the end, not the physical ending.

Thantris have the exclusive right to conduct certain core rituals in temples of Kerala and Tulunadu. In temples like Sabarimala, the presence of thantri is needed every day.

Daily rituals in Kerala temples are traditionally performed by Namboothiris, and often by Embranthiri migrants from Karnataka. Even among Namboothiris, only designated families become thanthris. Thanthris have to perform the task of transferring (skt. Aavaahanam) the aura (skt. Chaithanyam) of the deity and energizing the idol. The techniques employed are described in the aagamas.

The first step of a Yajamaanan (a person who has prepared himself mentally and financially) to build a temple, is to seek and accept (Varikkal) an aacharyan (Thanthri). Sanskrit text Thanthra Samuchayam identifies an ideal aachaaryan as one who is born into a Brahmin family, has performed all the Shodasakriyas from Garbhaadhaanam to Agnyaadhaanam, has understood the concepts contained in the Vedas and Aagamas (Braahmacharyam, Gaarhasthhyam, Vaanaprasthham and Samnyaasam), has received blessings and Manthram advice from Gurus and elders, is an expert in performing rites and rituals (Karmams), is capable of receiving spiritual powers through meditation and penance (Thapas). Future Aachaaryans of the temple must be descendants of this Guru or Thanthri.

During the evolution and development of Thanthric philosophy, two kinds of aachaaryas emerged - the theoreticians and the practitioners. While the former developed concepts and prescribed procedures, the latter perfected their performance through strict discipline, leading to the attainment of the expected results.

== Scriptures on Thanthras ==
The treatises may be divided into three categories: Aagamas (Shaivism), Samhithas (Vaishnavism) and Thanthrams (Shakthism). (Aagamas include Nigama versions.) The former are Shiva's advice to Parvathy, while Nigamas are spoken by Parvathy to Shiva. Other classifications are regional, such as Vishnukraanthaa, Rathhakraanthaa and Aswaakraanthaa, and also Yaamalams and Daamarams.

Keraleeyans have also written treatises. The most popular is Thanthra Samuchayam by Chennas Narayanan Namboodiripad, who was one among the 18 ½ poets of the Saamoothiri's court. He consolidated and systematized the scattered literature which had then complicated its learning and practice. Written in simple style and understandable by the common man, it covers topics such as building of temples, consecration of murtis, kalasams, uthsavams and praayaschithams.

Several commentaries (skt. vyakhyanam) were written both in Sanskrit and Malayalam. The treatise describes rituals related to seven deities: Shiva, Vishnu, Durga, Saasthaavu, Subrahmanian, Ganapathy, and Sankaranarayanan The aagamams of these deities have been condensed, as expressed by the author, when he stated, "Swaagama-saara-samgrahaal".

Two known commentaries in Sanskrit are Vimarsini and Vivaranam. Later, several translations into Malayalam were completed, of which Kuzhikkaattu Pacha by Kuzhikkaattu Maheswaran Bhattathiripad is the most popular. Works such as Thozhaanooranushtthaanam and Parameswaraanushtthaanam deal with the same topics, also from Kerala.
