= Dhvajastambha =

Flagstaff, a common feature of South Indian Hindu temples

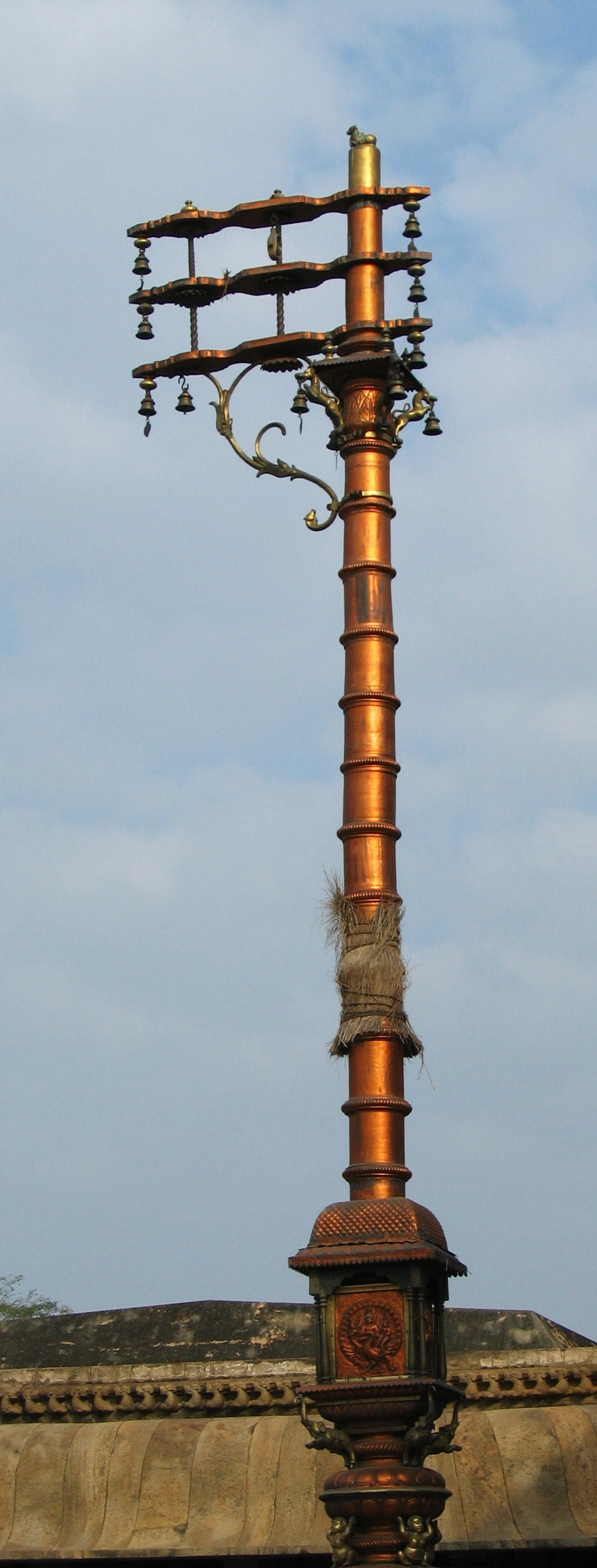
Brihadeeswarar Temple, Thanjavur, Tamil Nadu, India.

The dhvajastambha (ध्वजस्तम्भ) refers to the flagstaff erected in front of the mukhamaṇḍapa (front pavilion) of a Hindu temple. The dhvajastambha is usually built within the temple walls (prākāra). They are traditionally built of wood and stone, where the wooden variety is often finished with a metal covering (kavaca). The dhvajastambha is a common feature in South Indian temples.

Two other objects that are grouped together with this flagstaff are the bali pitham (altar for offerings) and the vehicle (vahana) of the deity to whom the temple is dedicated. Symbolically, these three objects are shields that protect the sanctuary of the temple from the impure and undevoted.

== Churches in Kerala ==
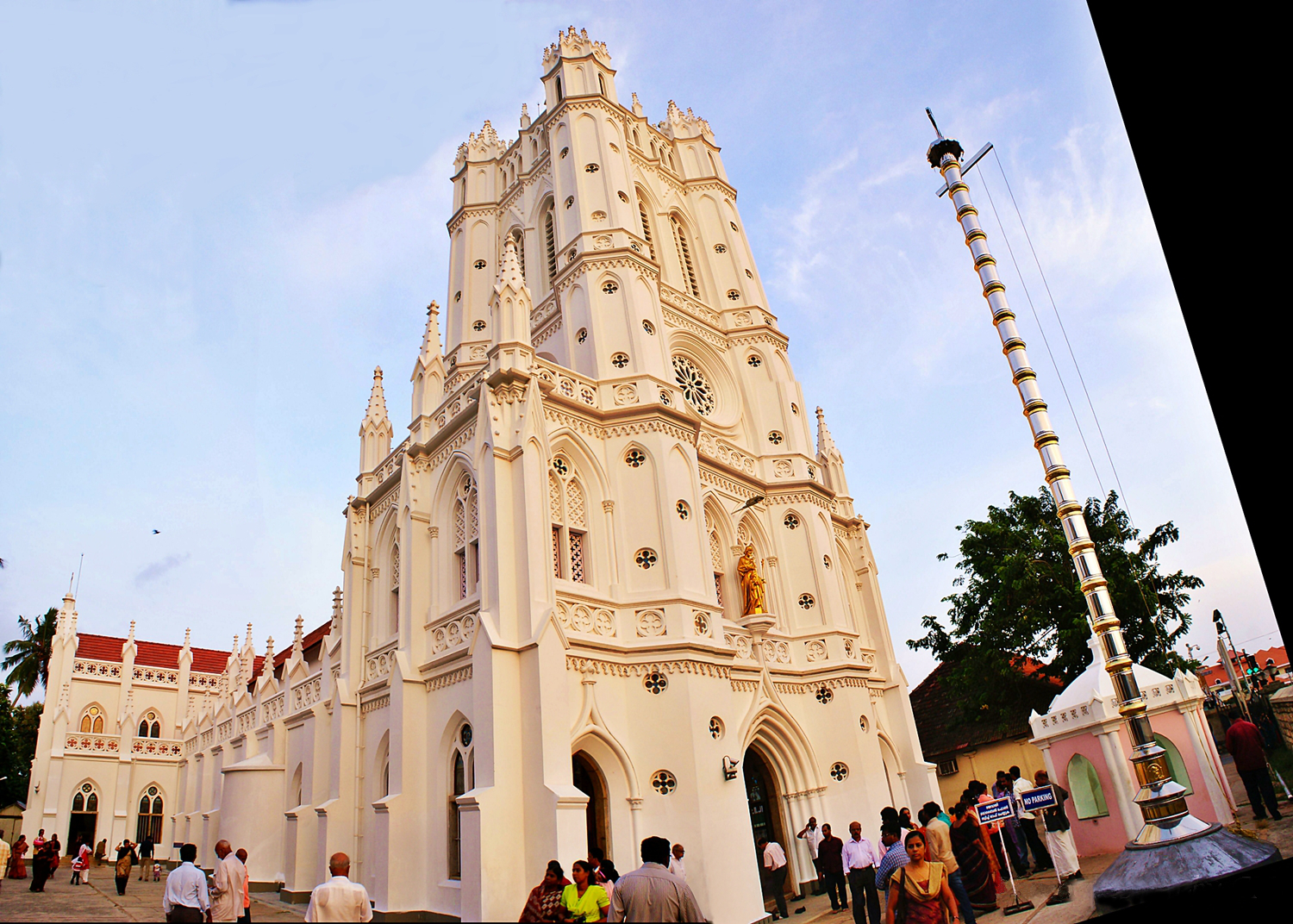
Dwajasthambam in front of St. Joseph's Cathedral, Trivandrum, Kerala

Dwajasthambam are a common element in front of churches in Kerala, India, often with a cross at the top.

== See also ==
- Dhvaja
- Gopuram
- Vahana
- Hindu temple architecture
