= Chengannur Assembly constituency =

Constituency of the Kerala legislative assembly in India

Chengannur
- Constituency No. 110 for the Kerala Legislative Assembly
- Chengannur within Alappuzha district

Constituency details
- Country: India
- Region: South India
- State: Kerala
- District: Alappuzha
- Lok Sabha constituency: Mavelikara
- Established: 1957
- Total electors: 2,08,498 (2021)
- Reservation: None

Member of Legislative Assembly
- 16th Kerala Legislative Assembly
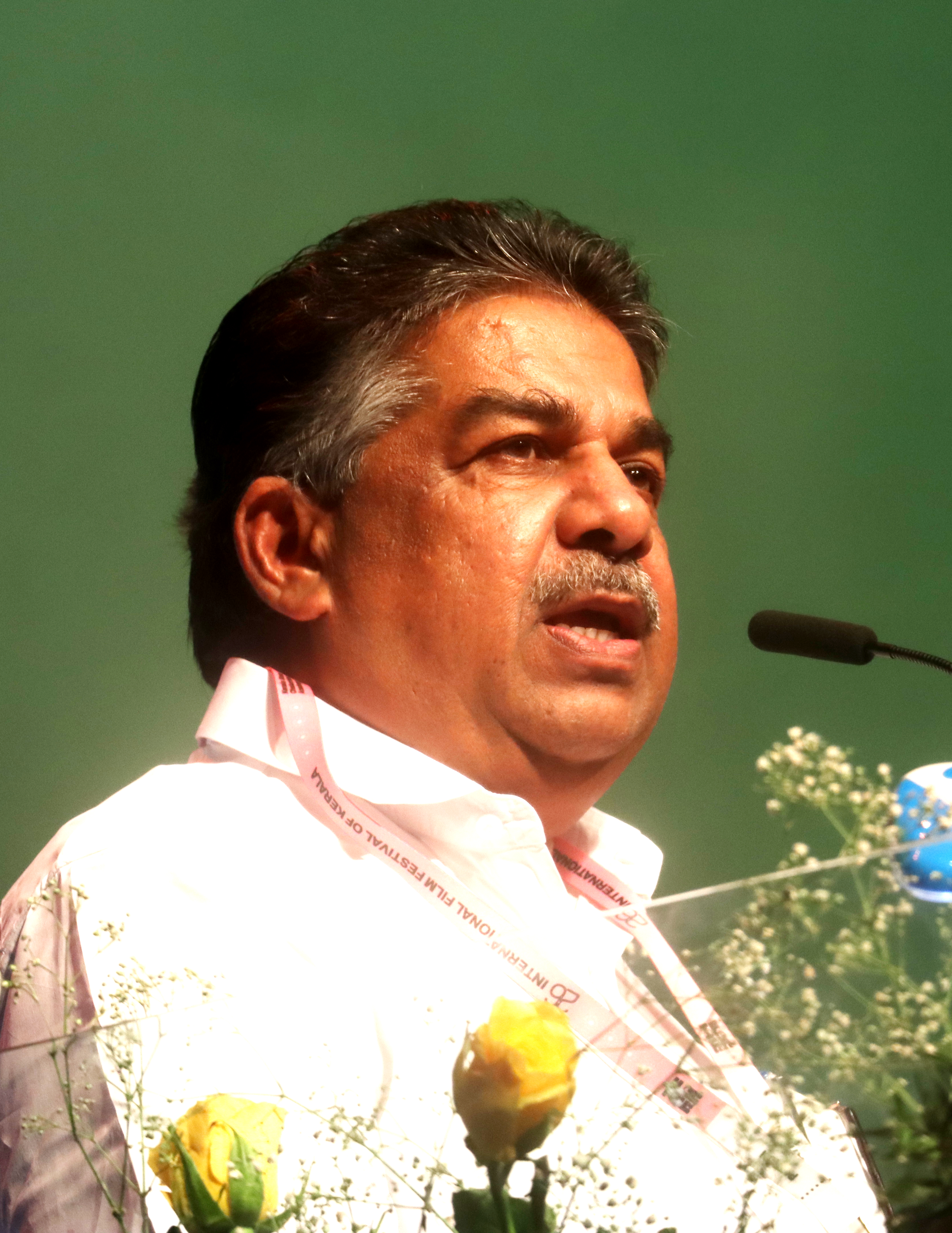
- Incumbent Saji Cherian
- Party: CPI(M)
- Alliance: LDF
- Elected year: 2026

Chengannur Assembly constituency is one of the 140 state legislative assembly constituencies in Kerala, India. It is one of the seven assembly segments that constitute the Mavelikara Lok Sabha constituency. Since 2021, it has been represented by Saji Cherian of the Communist Party of India (Marxist).

== Local self-governed segments ==
Chengannur Assembly constituency is composed of the following local self-governed segments:

Name	Status (Grama panchayat/Municipality)	Taluk	Ruling alliance
Chengannur	Municipality	Chengannur	UDF
Ala	Grama panchayat	Chengannur	NDA
Budhanoor	Grama panchayat	Chengannur	NDA
Cheriyanad	Grama panchayat	Chengannur	UDF
Mannar	Grama panchayat	Chengannur	LDF
Mulakuzha	Grama panchayat	Chengannur	LDF
Pandanad	Grama panchayat	Chengannur	NDA
Puliyoor	Grama panchayat	Chengannur	UDF
Thiruvanvandoor	Grama panchayat	Chengannur	NDA
Venmony	Grama panchayat	Chengannur	LDF
Chennithala-Thriperumthura	Grama panchayat	Mavelikkara	NDA

== Members of Legislative Assembly ==
The following list contains all members of Kerala Legislative Assembly who have represented the constituency:

Key

INC CPI(M) NDP CPI IC(S)

Election	Niyama Sabha	Member	Party	Tenure
1957	1st	R. Sankaran Thampi	CPI	1957 – 1960
1960	2nd	K. R. Saraswathi Amma	INC	1960 – 1965
1965		K. R. Saraswathi Amma	INC	1965-67
1967	3rd	P. G. P. Pillai	CPI(M)	1967 – 1970
1970	4th	P. G. P. Pillai	CPI(M)	1970 – 1977
1977	5th	Thankappan Pillai	NDP	1977 – 1980
1980	6th	K. R. Saraswathi Amma	NDP	1980 – 1982
1982	7th	S. Ramachandran Pillai	NDP	1982 – 1987
1987	8th	Mammen Iype	IC(S)	1987 – 1991
1991	9th	Shobhana George	INC	1991 – 1996
1996	10th	Shobhana George	INC	1996 – 2001
2001	11th	Shobhana George	INC	2001 – 2006
2006	12th	P. C. Vishnunath	INC	2006 – 2011
2011	13th	P. C. Vishnunath	INC	2011 – 2016
2016	14th	K. K. Ramachandran Nair	CPI(M)	2016 – 2018
2018*	14th	Saji Cherian	CPI(M)	2018 - 2021
2021	15th	Saji Cherian	CPI(M)	2021 - 2026
2026	16th	Saji Cherian	CPI(M)	Incumbent

== Electorate ==
As of 2026, the constituency has 189,490 voters. As per estimates 32% of the electorate is Nair, 24% Ezhava and 30% Christians predominantly from Malankara Orthodox Syrian Church and Mar Thoma Syrian Church.

== Election results ==
Percentage change (±%) denotes the change in the number of votes from the immediate previous election.

=== 2026 ===
2026 Kerala Legislative Assembly election: Chengannur
Party	Candidate	Votes	%	±%
CPI(M)	Saji Cherian	57,859	42.1	▼6.48
INC	Adv. Abi Kuriakose	47,567	34.61	▲7.83
BJP	M. V. Gopakumar	30,942	22.51	▼1.01
NOTA	None of the above	638	0.46	▲0.13
SUCI(C)	B. Praneesh	429	0.31	▲0.1
Margin of victory		10,292	7.49	▼14.38
Turnout		1,37,435	72.03	▲1.44
CPI(M) hold		Swing	▼6.48	

By Local body Segments
No.	Status (Local body)	Votes			Lead
No.	Status (Local body)	Saji Cherian	Abi Kuriakose	M. V. Gopakumar	Lead
1	Mannar	6,457	5,233	3,804	1,224
2	Pandanad	2,443	2,366	1,517	77
3	Thiruvanvandoor	3,113	3,027	2,749	86
4	Chengannur Municipality	5,849	6,409	3,198	560
5	Mulakkuzha	6,645	4,620	2,492	2,025
6	Ala	7,015	5,103	2,853	1,912
7	Puliyoor	2,461	2,113	1,476	348
8	Budhanoor	5,868	3,850	3,187	2,018
9	Chennithala-Thriperumthura	6,533	5,488	3,504	1,045
10	Cheriyanad	5,028	4,135	3,075	893
11	Venmony	5,430	4,257	2,552	1,173
	Postal Votes	1,017	966	535	51

=== 2021 ===
There were 2,08,498 registered voters in the Chengannur constituency for the 2021 Kerala Assembly election.

2021 Kerala Legislative Assembly election: Chengannur
Party	Candidate	Votes	%	±%
CPI(M)	Saji Cherian	71,502	48.58	▲3.39
INC	M. Murali	39,409	26.78	▼4.37
BJP	M. V. Gopakumar	34,620	23.52	▼0.16
Independent	Shaji T. George	534	0.36	–
NOTA	None of the above	493	0.33	▼0.26
SUCI	T. K. Gopinathan	316	0.21	–
Independent	Melivin K. Mathew	198	0.13	–
Margin of victory		32,093	21.87	▲8.02
Turnout		1,47,171	70.59	▼8.73
CPI(M) hold		Swing	▲3.39	

=== 2018 by-election ===
Following the death of the sitting MLA K. K. Ramachandran Nair, a by-election was held in the Chengannur constituency on 28 March 2018. There were 2,00,137 registered voters in the constituency for the by-election.

2018 Kerala Assembly By-election: Chengannur
Party	Candidate	Votes	%	±%
CPI(M)	Saji Cherian	67,303	45.19	▲8.85
INC	D. Vijayakumar	46,347	31.12	▲0.27
BJP	P. S. Sreedharan Pillai	35,270	23.68	▼5.65
Independent	Swami Sukbaksh Saraswathi	800	0.53	
NOTA	None of the above	728	0.07	▼0.18
AAP	Rajeev Pallathu	368	0.24	−
Independent	Mobran Achary	263	0.17	
RLD	Jiji Puntbala	248	0.16	
Independent	Aji. M. Chalakeri	137	0.09	
Independent	Madhu Chengannur	124	0.08	
Independent	Sreedharan Pillai	121	0.08	
Independent	Somnatha Warrier T. K.	98	0.06	
Independent	Unni Karthikeyan	57	0.04	
API	Subhash Naga	53	0.04	
Independent	Murali Naga	44	0.03	
Independent	A. K. Shaji	39	0.03	
Independent	Sivaprasad Gandhi K. M.	21	0.01	
Independent	M. C. Jayalal	20	0.01	
Margin of victory		20,956	13.85	
Turnout		1,58,756	79.32	▲5.59
CPI(M) hold		Swing	▲8.85	

=== 2016 ===
There were 1,97,372 registered voters in the constituency for the 2016 Kerala Assembly election.

2016 Kerala Legislative Assembly election: Chengannur
Party	Candidate	Votes	%	±%
CPI(M)	K. K. Ramachandran Nair	52,880	36.34	▼5.67
INC	P. C. Vishnunath	44,897	30.85	▼21.13
BJP	P. S. Sreedharan Pillai	42,682	29.33	▲24.49
Independent	Sobhana George	3,966	2.73	−
BSP	Alex	483	0.33	−
NOTA	None of the above	363	0.25	−
Independent	E. T. Sasi	247	0.17	
Margin of victory		8,013	5.49	▼4.48
Turnout		1,45,518	73.73	▲2.86
CPI(M) gain from INC		Swing		

=== 2011 ===
There were 1,76,875 registered voters in the constituency for the 2011 election.

2011 Kerala Legislative Assembly election: Chengannur
Party	Candidate	Votes	%	±%
INC	P. C. Vishnunath	65,156	51.98	▲1.48
CPI(M)	C. S. Sujatha	52,656	42.01	▼2.59
BJP	B. Radhakrishna Menon	6,062	4.84	▲1.04
Independent	Surendran Karippuzha	848	0.68	−
SUCI(C)	V. Venugopal	623	0.50	
Margin of victory		12,500	9.97	▲4.07
Turnout		1,25,345	70.87	▼1.13
INC hold		Swing	▲1.48	

=== 2006 ===
There were 1,21,105 registered voters in the constituency for the 2006 election.

2006 Kerala Legislative Assembly election: Chengannur
Party	Candidate	Votes	%	±%
INC	P. C. Vishnunath	44,010	50.5	▲6.9
CPI(M)	Saji Cherian	38,878	44.6	▲2.5
BJP	Mannar Satheesh	3,299	3.8	▼9.5
Independent	Sasi E. T.	488	0.6	
Independent	V. Venugopal	416	0.5	
Margin of victory		5,132	5.9	▲4.4
Turnout		87,139	72.0	▼0.1
INC hold		Swing	▲6.9	

=== 2001 ===
There were 1,31,196 registered voters in the constituency for the 2001 election.

2001 Kerala Legislative Assembly election: Chengannur
Party	Candidate	Votes	%	±%
INC	Sobhana George	41,242	43.6	
CPI(M)	K. K. Ramachandran Nair	39,777	42.1	
BJP	M. T. Ramesh	12,598	13.3	
Independent	Adv. Sanalkumar	902	1.0	
Margin of victory		1,465	1.5	
Turnout		94,522	72.1	
INC hold		Swing		

== See also ==
- Chengannur
- Alappuzha district
- List of constituencies of the Kerala Legislative Assembly
- 2016 Kerala Legislative Assembly election
