= List of colleges and schools in Chengannur =

List of colleges and schools in Chengannur:

== Colleges ==
- College of Engineering Chengannur
- Mount Zion Institute of Science & Technology, Kozhuvalloor
- St. Thomas College of Engineering And Technology, Kozhuvalloor
- Christian College, Chengannur
- Sree Narayana College, Ala, Chengannur
- Sree Ayyappa College, Eramallikkara, Chengannur
- Providence College of Engineering, Chengannur
- College of applied science, Perissery, Chengannur
- Mar ivanios law college, Puliyoor
- Govt. Industrial training institute, Chengannur
- Dr. KM Cheriyan Institute of Medical Sciences kallissery, Chengannur

== Schools ==
• SNDP ups Ala

• SN Trust HSS cheriyand

- Mathews Mar Athanasius Residential School, Chengannur
- A.M.M Higher Secondary School, Edayaranmula
- St. Gregorios School Senior Secondary School, Chengannur
- High School Kallissery
- Metropolitan Higher Secondary School Puthencavu
- Ebenezer EM High School, Kallissery
- Chinmaya Vidyalaya, Chengannur
- Government Boys School
- Government Girls School
- St Anne's G.H School, Nursery, U.P, Highschool, Higher secondary
- Thalapanagad LP School (also known as Madathilparampil School)
- JBS MANGALAM
- St. George Public School Kozhuvalloor
- St Mary's Residential Mulakkuzha
- Devaswom Board High School, Cheriyanad
- Devaswom Board Higher Secondary School, Cheriyanad
- Srivijayeshwari High School, Cheriyanad
- St Bursouma's Public School & Junior College, Ayranikudy, Pandalam
- St Judes UP School, Venmoney
- Government High School, Puliyoor
- Snehagiri UP School, Puliyoor
- Government Primary School, Thonakadu
- Mar Philexinos U P School, Puthencavu
- G M P Kindergarten School, Puthencavu
- C M S U P School, Kodukulanji
- John Memorial High School, Kodukulanji
- Christ Church Vidyapeeth, Kodukulanji
- Raja Rajeswari Central School kodukulanji
- Mar Pilexinos L P School, Neervilakom
- N S S High School, Edanadu
- Government U.P.S Perissery
- GHS Thiruvavandoor
- Sree Hariharasutha Vilasom (S.H.V) High School, Karakkad
- Government L.P School, Karakkad
- St Joseph English medium school, Cheriyanad (I.C.S.E.)
- L P School Piralassery (ESTD 1889)
- E.A.L.P School Angadical
- SNDP LP School, Kozhuvalloor
- Government High School, Mulakuzha
- St.Mary's School, Kallisery
- Government Higher Secondary School, Angadical South
- Swami Vivekananda High School Pandanad (SVHS)
- St Ignatious Cathedral English Medium School, Mundancavu
- Sree Vijayswary High School, Cheriyanad
- SREE BHUVANESWARI HIGHER SECONDARY SCHOOL, MANNAR
- Scrv TTI angadical chengannur
