= Kodukulanji =

Village in India

- village
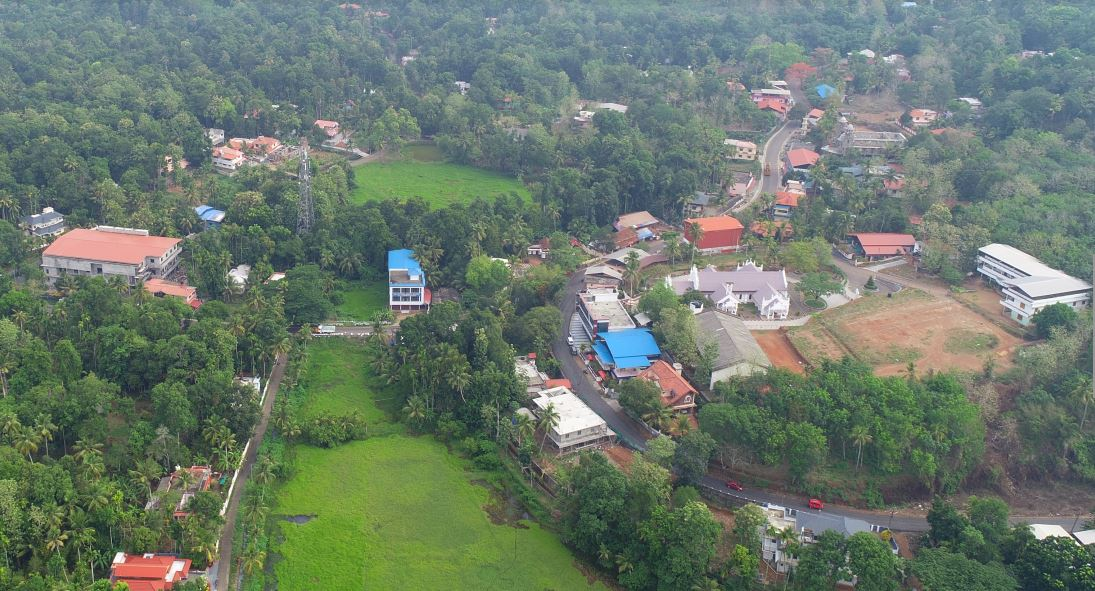
- Aerial View of Kodukulanji
- Interactive map of Kodukulanji
- Coordinates: 9°16′12″N 76°36′42″E
- Country: India
- State: Kerala
- District: Alappuzha

Government
  - Body: Ala Panchayat

Languages
  - Official: Malayalam, English
- Time zone: UTC+5:30 (IST)
- PIN: 689508
- Telephone code: 0479
- Vehicle registration: KL-4/KL-30
- Coastline: 0 kilometres (0 mi)
- Nearest city: Cochin
- Lok Sabha constituency: Mavelikara
- Civic agency: Ala Panchayat
- Climate: Tropical monsoon (Köppen)
- Avg. summer temperature: 35 °C (95 °F)
- Avg. winter temperature: 20 °C (68 °F)
- Website: .

Kodukulanji is a village located in Venmoney and Ala Panchayat around 5 km north of the Achankovil River and 7 km south of the Pamba River, in Alappuzha district.

== Location ==
Kodukulanji is located around 5 km north of the Achankovil River and 7 km south of the Pamba River. The village is predominantly Syrian Christian. Kodukulanji is one of the highest places in Alapuzha district. The village comes under two panchayats, Ala and Venmoney. The legislative constituency is Chengannur and parliamentary constituency is Mavelikara.

Kodukulanji is also famous for a 13th Century Ayyappa temple situated at a peak, highest in Alleppey. Varattar, a tributary of the Pamba River, flows through Kodukulanji.

Kodukulanji (part of ALA Panchayath) is on the banks of Uttarappalli River (ഉത്തരപ്പളി ആറ്) also known as Varattar (വരട്ടാർ) locally. This river is a natural interlinking of Achankovil and Pampa rivers.

== Etymology ==
The name Kodukulanji originated from two words "Kodu" which means "curves" and "kulanji" a tree(reeds that grows lavishily )which was once common in this place.

== Location ==
Kodukulanji is a village which is situated about 8 km south of Chengannur town and 10 km from Mavelikara town.

The proposed National Highway NH 183 which connects Kollam to Theni passes through Kodukulanji.

The two major cities of Kerala, Cochin city in Ernakulam district and Thiruvananthapuram city are approximately 110 kilometers apart from Kodukulanji.

== Transport ==
Kodukulanji is a junction of two roads. One road goes to Mavelikara via Kollakadavu. The other road leads to Pandalam via Venmoney.

Proposed Kollam-Theni Highway (NH 220) passes through Kodukulanji

Private buses dominate the public transportation in this route. KSRTC also operates bus services through this area on a smaller scale. Private buses are running in this route with an average time interval of 10 to 15 minutes from Chengannur and Mavelikara private bus stands. Nearest main railway station is Chengannur (7 km). Nearest airport is Trivandrum International Airport which is at a distance of 123 km from Kodukulanji.

== Religion ==
The population in Kodukulanji practices Hinduism and Christianity.

=== Churches ===
- C.S.I Christ Church

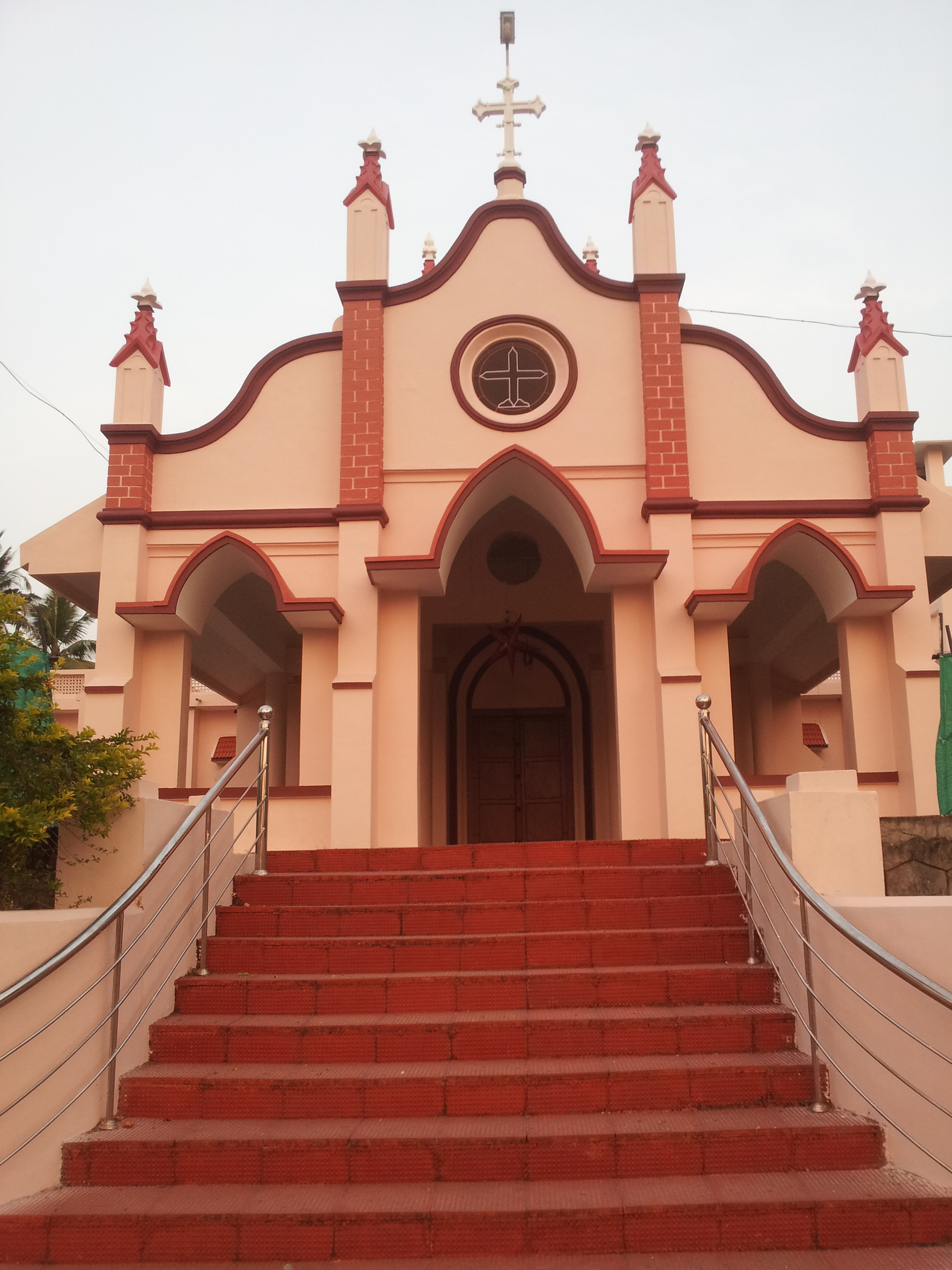
Csichristchurch kodukulanji

C.S.I Christ church was established in the year 1842 by CMS missionaries. To begin with there were only 8 Christian families‚ but in due course more Christian families joined the church from surrounding areas like Pennukkara, Cheriyanad, Cheruvalloor, Kozhuvalloor, and Kollakadavu. The main building of the present church was constructed in the year 1846.

- Prakashagiri St Mary's Orthodox Church
- St John's Malankara Catholic Church
- Indian Pentecostal Church of God (I.P.C., Bethel Church, Kodukulanji)
- St. Paul's C.S.I Church
- The Pentecostal Mission Church (TPM)
- Church of God (Full Gospel), Kodukulanji

=== Hindu Temples ===
- Dharma Sastavu Temple: Dharma Sastavu temple is situated at Kuthiravatoom which is about 1 km from Kodukulanji.

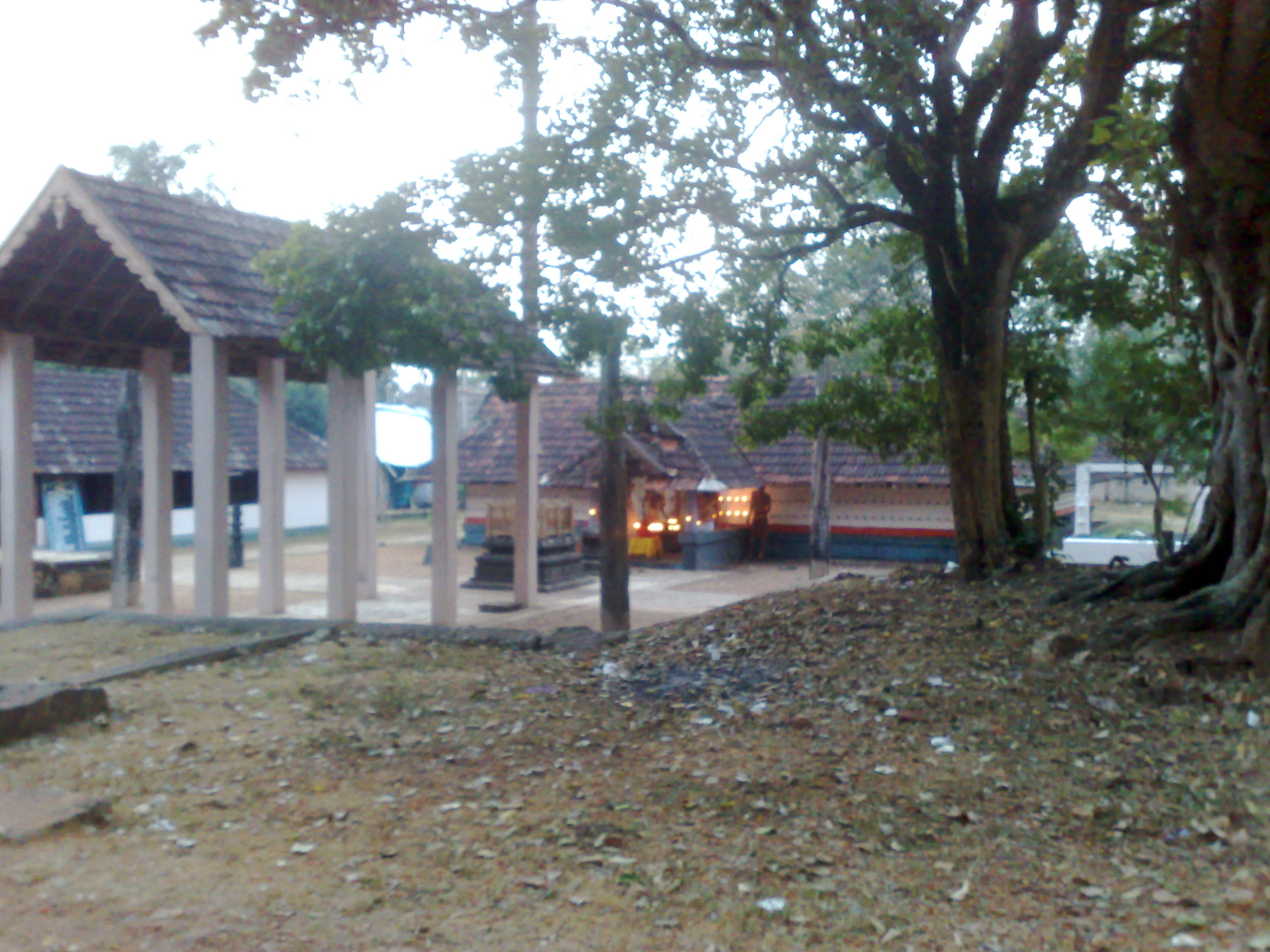
കുതിരവട്ടം ശ്രീ ധർമ്മ ശാസ്താ ക്ഷേത്രം

Another temple was constructed at Poovannalkavu near Parachantha and opened to public on the year of 2012. The new temple was built by the two NSS Karayogams (Kodukulanji and Kodukulanji Karode).

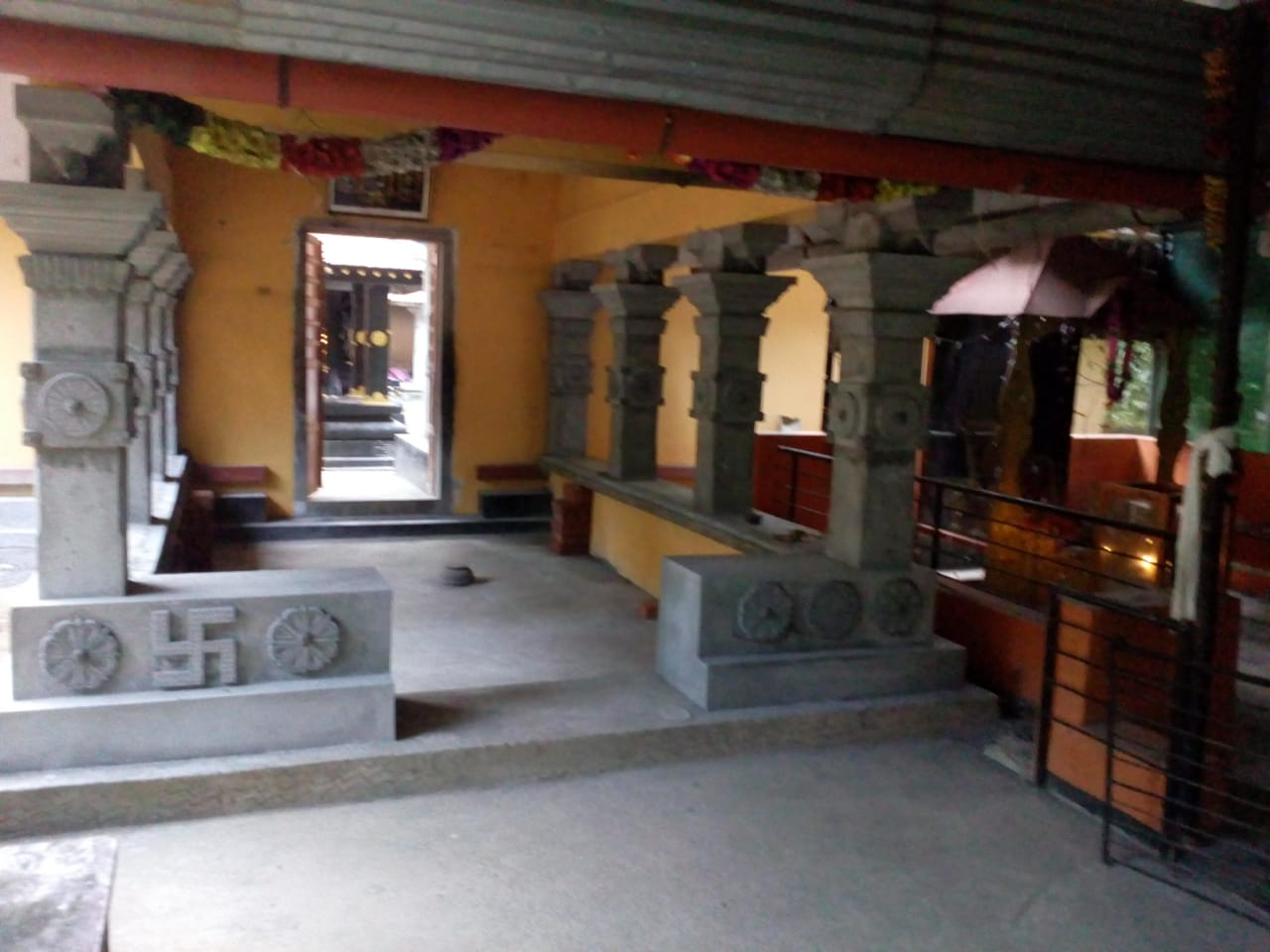

== Politics ==
Kodukulanji is a part of Ala grama panchayat. The assembly constituency is Chengannur and Parliamentary constituency is Mavelikara. In the 2010 local body elections the United Democratic Front (UDF) alliance got absolute majority in the Ala Grama panchayat with 9 seats out of 13. Left Democratic Front (LDF) and Bharathiya Janatha party (BJP) got 2 seats each. The current Panchayat President is Mr. Bahulayen C.K of Indian National Congress (INC).

== Schools ==
The schools functioning at Kodukulanji are C.M.S UP school, Christ Church Vidyapith, John Memorial High School, Raja Rajesweri Senior Secondary School.

- C.M.S UP school

C.M.S UP School was started in 1842 by C.M.S Missionaries. The school has Classes up to 7th standard and follows Kerala state syllabus

- Christ Church Vidyapith

Christ Church Vidyapith was started in 2000 and is managed by C.S.I Management. The school follows C.B.S.E syllabus and has classes from LKG up to 10th Standard.

- John Memorial High School

John Memorial High school has Classes from 8th Standard to 10th Standard. The schools follows Kerala state syllabus

- Raja Rajeshwari Senior Secondary School

Raja Rajeshwari school was started in 1998 and has classes from LKG up to 12th standard. The school follows C.B.S.E syllabus

== Colleges ==
- St. Thomas College of Engineering & Technology

St. Thomas College of Engineering & Technology is situated at Kozhuvalloor, which is at a distance of 1.5 km from Kodukulanji. The college was established on 2010.

- Mount Zion College of Engineering for Women

Mount Zion College of Engineering for Women, is situated at Kozhuvalloor. The college was established in 2009.

== Places to see ==
Kuthiravattom Chira, which is situated at a distance of one km from Kodukulanji is surrounded by fresh water body covering acres. To augment its beauty "Kuthiravattom Chira Tourism" project, a joint venture of the Venmoney grama panchayat of the Chengannur block and the District Tourism Promotion Councils (DTPC) was commenced in 2008.As part of the first phase, a camp site-cum-convention centre, huts, dwelling units and an open theatre will be constructed. The project is included in the DTPC's `My Village' scheme

other attractions including

PALLONNI CHAL

POOMALA CHAL

AND MABRAPADAM WALK

== See also ==
- Alappuzha District
- Chengannur
- Mavelikkara
