= Cherian =

Cherian/Cheriyan is a Malayali Syrian Christian surname of Semitic (Hebrew-Aramaic) origin, presumed to be a derivative of Zecharya (Zacharias or Zechariah) and a variant of Zacharias popular among the Christian community of Kerala, southern India. The final -n is the Malayalam third-person masculine singular suffix.

In India it is mostly found only as a given name although this trend is changing in the present generations, but in the United States and United Kingdom, Europe and Australia, and also Indian states other than Kerala, it is also used as a family name among expatriate families from Kerala.

== Origins ==
The generally accepted explanation is that this name is of Semitic (Hebrew-Aramaic) origin, presumed to be a derivative of Zecharya (Zacharias or Zechariah) and a variant of Zacharias. This is supported by the fact that Kerala was one of the chief centers for ancient spice trading between the West and East and there was a historic Nasrani community with religious, linguistic, cultural and genetic connections to the Levant and Middle East. The final -n is the typical Malayalam third-person masculine singular suffix.

There is an alternative hypothesis suggesting an Armenian origin for the name. This relies on the empirical observation that a name ending with ian is highly probable to be an Armenian name. The original candidate Armenian name is Khatcherian which means "follower or son of the Cross". This theory also takes support from the fact that there has been significant presence of Armenians in India, especially Chennai and Kolkata, who migrated to India to escape persecution from Turkey.

== Notable people with the name ==
- M. E. Cherian (1917 – 2 October 1993), an Indian Christian evangelist, Bible teacher, poet, and hymn writer.
- Cherian K. Cherian (born 1932), Malayalam–language poet from Kerala
- Cheriyan Kalpakavadi, Indian screenwriter for Malayalam films
- Cherian Philip (born 1953), politician in Kerala, consultant for Kairali TV and former chairman of KTDC
- Accamma Cherian (1909–1982), Indian freedom-fighter
- Jacob Cherian (1923–2007), a.k.a. Ayya, Indian surgeon, educationist and social worker
- Jayan K. Cherian, Indian poet and filmmaker living in USA
- Joy Cherian (born 1942), the first Indian American Commissioner at the United States Equal Employment Opportunity Commission (EEOC)
- K. M. Cherian (doctor) (1942–2025), Indian heart surgeon who performed India's first coronary artery bypass surgery
- K. M. Cherian (journalist) (1897–1973), media personality and chief editor of Malayala Manorama daily
- M. K. Cheriyan, Indian teacher, literarian, Biblical scholar and orator
- P. V. Cherian (1893–1969), Indian physician, surgeon, politician and Governor (of Maharashtra)
- Saji Cherian (born 1965), Indian politician
- Tara Cherian (1913–2000), Indian social activist and politician, the first woman mayor of Madras city

== Fictional characters ==
- Neha Cherian, in the novel Five Point Someone by Chetan Bhagat
