= Ezhakadavu =

Village in Alappuzha District, Kerala, India

Ezhakadavu is a village towards the southernmost end of Chennithala-Tripperunthura panchayat. It falls under the Alappuzha district.
