= Attuvassery =

Village in Kollam District, Kerala, India

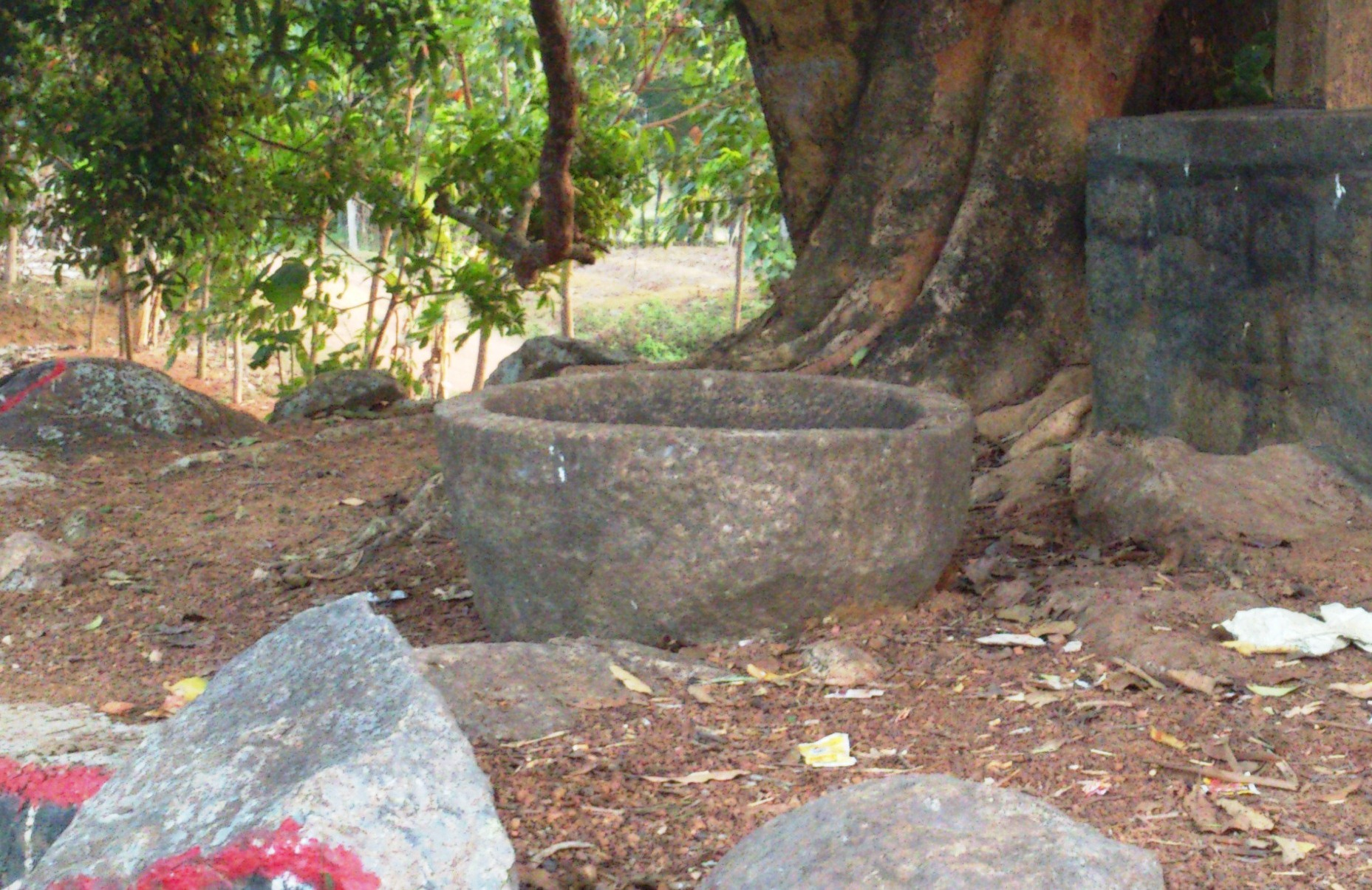
Kalathotti

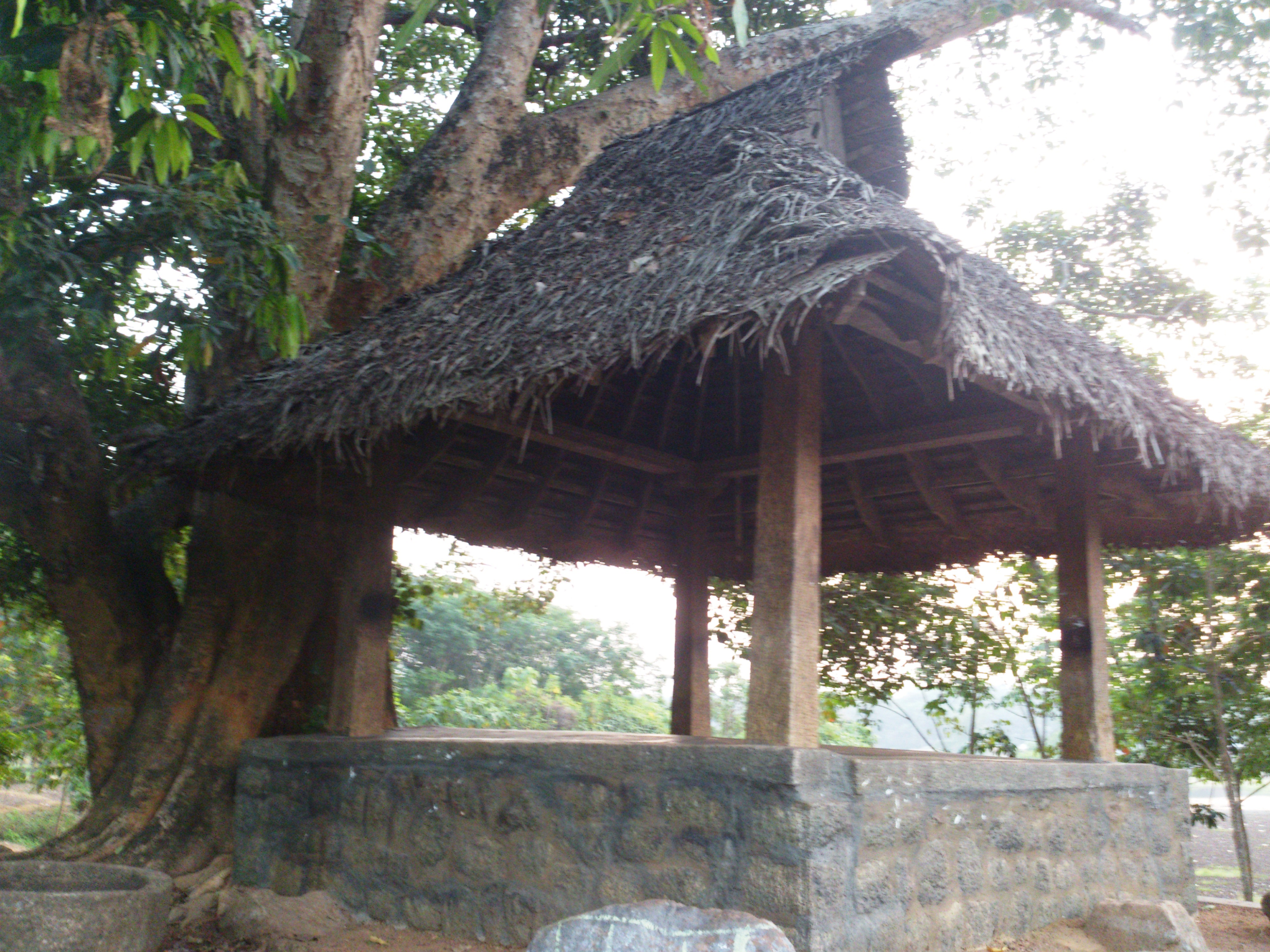
Kalathattu

Attuvassery (Malayalam: ആറ്റുവാശ്ശേരി) is a village in Kollam district in the state of Kerala in southern India. The Kallada River flows through the village from east and south. On the other side of the river, Attuvassery is in the east and Thekkumchery is in the south, while on the west side are Kadampanadu and North Mannady.

== Economy ==
The economy is mainly dependent upon agriculture but now most of the paddy fields are abandoned by farmers due to the shortage of workers as the new generation is not engaging in the agriculture field because of the low return. Educated youths are seeking government jobs or overseas jobs which are more profitable.

== Environmental problems ==
A large quantity of the land area has been converted from vegetable farming to rubber estates so inhabitants of this area is gradually becoming dependent on other states for food items. The village does contain some brick factories and two (One is at Pakistan Mukku and other one is at kaleekkalazhikathu mukku) cashew-processing factory, however. Sand mining from Kallada river was one source of income but this is totally controlled by authorities due to environmental problems. Now the un-authorised mining is also doing in large scale by the support of corrupted panchayath, police, RT officials. Attuvassery is a village in kottarakkara taluk, Vettikkavala block, near Tekkumcheri and Mavadi, Attuvassery is a beautiful village that has number of good sceneries like "kattakkuzhi, kalathattu etc.."

== Etymology ==
Attuvassery, the land lying in the mouth (va) of kalladayar, so as it call as attuvacheri, then it changed to Attuvassery. Another mythological story was based on mahabharatha. Noottavar was staying here once up on a time, then the land called as Noottuvassery, which again changed to Attuvassery. However, now the village known as Attuvassery.

Iverkala the name indicate 'IVER', Pandavas were lived in river bank during the 'Vanavasa' period."Attuvassey Kalathattu", an ancient resting place of travellers, is historically known since this kalathattu had given refuge to Raja Raja Sree Marthanda Varma, while he was being chased by his rivals in Thiruvithamkoor. The Fable is that he had played Chathurangam with villagers here who did not identify the Maharaja.Sacred Groves are also here.

== Land ==
Land in Attuvassery is fertile and often devoted to agriculture.

== Temples ==
Attuvassery has two temples on it. Both are about 250 – 500 years old. Both have very powerful vigraha. The villagers give respect to both. Dharma Sasthavu is the main prethishttah in Dharma Sastha Kshethram. The administration of temple is under N.S.S. Rudhira Bhayankari Khshetram, Kaalee devi is the main prethishttah in this temple. A Kaavu is located near the temple. This temple has a pond located in front of it.

== Agriculture ==
Till some years ago people in Attuvassery cultivated paddy in the fields. But people now mostly depend upon rubber and banana plants. 73% of the people in Attuvassery has rubber in their own land, 18%people cultivate banana, on Attuvassery's land, 9% vegetables.

== Transportation ==
Residents mainly rely on private vehicles and autorickshaws.

== Industry ==
There are two brick companies in Attuvassery. Again one brick factory will uplift in Attuvassery's land soon.

== Educational institutions ==
There is only one school in Attuvassery. It is S.V.N.S.S.U.P.S. It offering L.K.G to 7. All classes in this school get computer training. 97% people who live in Attuvassery studied in this school.
