= M. K. Cheriyan =

Prof. M. K. Cheriyan (born 13 August 1940) is a retired Principal of Bishop Moore College, an aided college in Mavelikara, in the Alappuzha district of Kerala, India. He served as the Principal of Bishop Moore College from 1989 - 1996. Prof. Cheriyan is an eminent teacher, a literarian, biblical scholar & orator.

== Biography ==
Prof. Cheriyan was born in Kozhuvallor, near Chenganoor. He did his early education at C.M.S Middle School, Kodukulanji and J.M. High School Kodukulanji. He finished his intermediate education at S.B College, Changanassery and took his bachelor's degree in Zoology major from NSS College, Pandalam. He completed a Master's degree at S.B College, Changanassery majoring in Malayalam Language and Literature in 1962.

=== Tenure at CMS College Kottayam ===
After finishing his education he started working as Malayalam Lecturer (Vaadhyar) at CMS College Kottayam. He worked at CMS College from 1962 to 1964 as lecturer in Malayalam Department. In 1964, along with two of his colleagues, Prof. Cheriyan joined Bishop Moore College in Mavelikara managed by Church of South India (CSI).

=== Tenure at Bishop Moore College ===
- Lecturer, Malayalam Department - 1964 to 1966.
- Professor, Malayalam Department - 1967 to 1975
- Head of the Department, Malayalam - 1975 to 1993
- Vice Principal - 1986 to 1989
- Principal - 1989 to 1996

After his retirement he served as the Principal of India Bible College in Paranthal.

Prof. M. K. Cheriyan has authored and published 15 books. His latest book "Gaveshana Swaryabham" won the first Njananikshepam Award in the year 2000.

On his 60th birthday, one of his students Thomas Neelaarmadam published a book named "Gaveshana Saraniyude Upaasakan" about Prof. Cheriyan and his contributions. His wife Prof. Rosamma Cheriyan is a retired lecturer of Physics from Bishop Moore College.
