= Kanaka Ha Ma =

Indian poet (born 1964)

- Born: 1978 (age 47–48); Karnataka, India
- Occupations: Writer; Poet; Columnist
- Spouse: P. C. Vishnunadh (m. 2007)

Kanaka Ha Ma is a noted Kannada poet and columnist. She has also been active as a theatre actor and a freelance journalist for Kannada publications.

== Family ==
Kanaka hails from Halikere, Shimoga district in Karnataka. She is married to P. C. Vishnunath who is the Minister for Culture and Tourism and the MLA for Kundara Legislative Assembly Constituency and the couple have one child.

== Work ==
Three collections of her poetry have been published by Akshara Prakashana which is run by Ninasam. She also translated noted Urdu poet, Javed Akhtar's book Tarkash to Kannada. Her poems are featured on Poetry International Rotterdam and have been translated into English and French. Kanaka also used to write columns for Kannada publications including Lankesh Patrike and Kannada daily Udayavani. While working with SPARROW (Sound and Picture Archives for Research on Women) she translated poems and interviews of Urdu, Marathi and Kannada writers and edited books on them. She is a founder member and Director of PAMPA (People for Performing Arts and More) which has organized the SIWE (South Indian Writers Ensemble) at Chengannur for the last 3 years. In November 1997, she attended the International Poetry Biennale at Ivry Sur Seine, France along with other well known poets like Kanimozhi and Bei Dao.

== Selected publications ==
- Holebagilu (The River Gate,1993)
- Papanashini (The Destroyer of Sins, 1997)
- Arabi emba kadalu (The Arabian Sea, 2006)
- Battalike (Tarkash, 2003)
