= P. C. Vishnunadh =

Indian politician (born 1978)

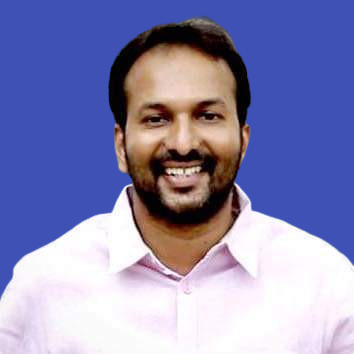

Minister for Tourism, Cinema and Culture, Government of Kerala
- Incumbent
- Assumed office 18 May 2026
- Chief Minister: V.D. Satheesan
- Portfolios: List: Tourism; Culture; Kerala State Film Development Corporation; (KSFDC); Kerala Chalachithra Academy; Kerala Cultural Activist Welfare Fund Board
- Preceded by: P. A. Mohammed Riyas (Tourism); Saji Cherian (Culture and Cinema)

Member of the Kerala Legislative Assembly
- Incumbent
- Assumed office 24 May 2021
- Preceded by: J. Mercykutty Amma
- Constituency: Kundara
- In office 2006 – 2016
- Preceded by: Shobhana George
- Succeeded by: K. K. Ramachandran Nair
- Constituency: Chengannur

Working President, Kerala Pradesh Congress Committee
- Incumbent
- Assumed office 2025

Personal details
- Born: 30 March 1978 (age 48) Mavadi, Kollam, Kerala, India
- Party: Indian National Congress
- Spouse: Kanaka Ha Ma (m. 2007)
- Parent(s): Chellappan Pillai; Leela C. Pillai
- Education: Government Law College, Thiruvananthapuram

Palottu Chellappan Pillai Vishnunadh (born 30 March 1978) is an Indian politician of the Indian National Congress who is currently serving as the Minister for Culture, Cinema and Tourism in the Government of Kerala. He represents the Kundara constituency in the Kerala Legislative Assembly.

== Biography ==
Vishnunadh was born in a Nair family to P. Chellappan Pillai and Leela C. Pillai at Mavadi, Kollam district. Vishnunadh is married to Kanaka Ha Ma and the couple have a daughter.

== Political career ==
Vishnunadh entered politics through Kerala Students Union (K.S.U.) and was Unit Secretary of Devaswom Board College, Sasthamkotta (1993). He was elected as the secretary, Arts Club, Devaswom Board College (1997) and University Union Councillor, Devaswom Board College (1998). Vishnunadh was elected to the Kerala University Senate in 2001 and 2002. He had participated in 'Memorial March' in 2005 commemorating the 75th anniversary of the Dandi March as the representative of Kerala State. He was state President of Kerala Students' Union (K.S.U.(I)) from 2002 to 2006. During his period with K.S.U, he was imprisoned in connection with the Strike conducted by K.S.U. against hike in bus charge. He has participated in many students' agitation and strikes. He was elected as Kerala Youth Congress President in 2010. In 2014, he was nominated as the KPCC general secretary. In 2017, he was appointed the Secretary of Indian National Congress with charge of Karnataka state. In January 2020, he was appointed the Vice President of Kerala Pradesh Congress Committee.

Vishnunadh was first elected to Kerala Legislative Assembly from Chengannur assembly constituency in 2006 Kerala Legislative Assembly election by defeating Saji Cherian of CPI(M) by a margin of 9531 votes. He was re-elected for the second time in 2011 Kerala Legislative Assembly election defeating Adv. C. S. Sujatha of CPI(M) by a margin of 12500 votes. In 2016 Kerala Legislative Assembly election he was defeated by Adv K. K. Ramachandran Nair of CPI(M) by a margin of 7983 votes. He had contested the 2021 Kerala Legislative Assembly election from Kundara assembly constituency and defeated J. Mercykutty Amma of Left Democratic Front (Kerala) by 4,523 votes.

== Other interests ==
Vishnunadh has sung a song in a short film named "Njan Kanda Keralam" directed by his friend Ramesh Makayiram.
