= Pennukkara =

- village
- Location in Kerala, India Pennukkara (India)
- Coordinates: 9°16′59″N 76°36′52″E
- Country: India
- State: Kerala
- District: Alappuzha

Government
  - Body: Ala Panchayat

Population (2019)
  - Total: 6,670

Languages
  - Official: Malayalam, English, Hindi
- Time zone: UTC+5:30 (IST)
- PIN: 689520
- Telephone code: 0479
- Vehicle registration: KL-4/KL-30
- Coastline: 0 kilometres (0 mi)
- Nearest city: Cochin
- Lok Sabha constituency: Mavelikara
- Civic agency: Ala Panchayat
- Climate: Tropical monsoon (Köppen)
- Avg. summer temperature: 32 °C (90 °F)
- Avg. winter temperature: 20 °C (68 °F)

Pennukkara is a small village situated about 5 km (3.1 mi) south of the town of Chengannur taluk of Alappuzha district, Kerala in India. Pennukkara is famous for its lagoons, Pond's and the Poomala Chal lake, & Natural heritages. The kerala's longest Canal Aquadate is situated at Pennukkara & Pennukkara (part of ALA Panchayath) is on the banks of Uttarappalli River ## Utharappalli_River also known as varattar locally. this river is a natural interlinking of Achankovil and Pampa rivers.

Pennukkara is a landmark site to travelers on the kollam -theni National highway, Chengannur-Mavelikkara Road, Pandalam Kozhuvaloor, Venmony, Kollam etc..

Administratively Pennukkara lies under the jurisdiction of ALA village Panchayat. Mostly this place is an agricultural strip of paddy field called Mampra padam. The physical features of the area follow the typical midland geographical pattern of Kerala, consisting of lush vegetation, fertile wet fields, and hilly terrain.

Malamodi, Kinaruvila, Valappuzha, Thevarakkode, Chammath, Pullamthazham, Utharapally are the minor places include in Pennukkara

There are private and state transport buses connecting Chengannur and kollam chain service, kozhuvalloor, Venmony, pandalam, Mavelikara, Haripad, Mannar, Alappuzha, through Pennukkara :-

- 5 km (3.1 mi) to Chengannur
- 12 km (7.5 mi) to Pandalam
- 13 km (8.1 mi) to mavelikara
- 15 km (9.3 mi) :- Thiruvalla
- 14 km (8.7 mi) :- Mannar
- 14 km (8.7 mi) :- Aranmula
- 22 km (14 mi) :- Kayamkulam
- 22 km (14 mi) :- Haripad
