= K. K. Ramachandran Nair =

Indian politician (1953–2018)

Adv. K. K. Ramachandran Nair
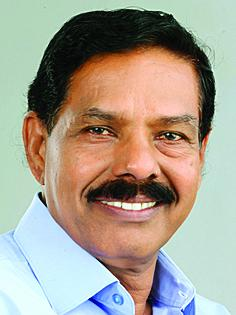

Member of Kerala Legislative Assembly from Chengannur
- In office 2016–2018
- Preceded by: P. C. Vishnunath
- Succeeded by: Saji Cherian
- Constituency: Chengannur

Personal details
- Born: 1953 Ala, Chengannur
- Died: 14 January 2018 (aged 64–65) Chennai, Tamil Nadu
- Party: Communist Party of India (Marxist)
- Spouse: Ponnumani
- Children: Prashanth Ramachandran
- Education: Government Law College, Thiruvananthapuram

K.K. Ramachandran Nair (1953 - 14 January 2018) was an Indian politician of the Communist Party of India (Marxist) and represented Chengannur constituency in the Kerala state legislative assembly from 2016 until his death.

== Personal life ==
Nair was born in 1953 at Ala, Chengannur. He graduated in Master of Economics from N. S. S. College, Pandalam. Later he pursued a degree in law from Government Law College, Thiruvananthapuram and completed the course in 1978.

He died at Apollo Hospital in Chennai on 14 January 2018 at 4 am. He was undergoing treatment for liver disease.

== Political career ==
Nair started his political career by unsuccessfully contesting in the Kerala Legislative Assembly Election 2001 from Chengannur assembly constituency. He was defeated by Shobhana George of the Indian National Congress by a margin of 1465 votes.

He was elected to Kerala Legislative Assembly from Chengannur assembly constituency in 2016 Kerala Legislative Assembly election by defeating P. C. Vishnunath of the Indian National Congress by a margin of 7983 votes. He held this post until his death in 2018.
