= Budhanoor =

Village in Chengannur taluk, Kerala, India

Budhanoor Budhanoor Grama Panchayat
- Village
- Location within Kerala
- Coordinates: 9.3141690°N 76.5666108°E
- Country: India
- State: Kerala
- District: Alappuzha District
- Taluk: Chengannur

Area
  - Total: 19.20 km^{2} (7.41 sq mi)

Population
  - Total: 18,444
  - Density: 960.63/km^{2} (2,488.0/sq mi)
- Time zone: UTC+5.30 (Indian Standard Time)
- Postal code: 689510
- Vehicle registration: KL30

Budhanoor is a village in Chengannur taluk, in the Alappuzha District of Kerala state, India. It has 14 wards – Kadamboor, Budhanoor West, Budhanoor East, Budhanoor South, Ennakkadu, Ennakkadu North, Ulunthy East, Ulunthy, Elanjimel, Perigalippuram West, Perigalippuram East, Gramam, Tayyoor and Perngadu. Neighboring villages are Mannar, Chennithala, Pandanadu and Puliyoor.

== Geography ==
Budhanoor has an average elevation of 1 meter above sea level. The climate in this village is moderate and pleasant.

== Trade and Industry ==
Budhanoor is known as a major trading center of compressed earth bricks in Alappuzha district. Budhanoor is also a trading center for dried Tamarind. Tamarind is a type of tropical fruit. It is a condiment flavor in many Kerala dishes, especially fish dishes.

== Education ==
Budhanoor has long been at the forefront of literacy and education. There are many high schools and higher secondary schools. The first secondary school was established in 1910 named Budhanoor Government Higher Secondary School.

== Sports ==
Young Men's Association (YMA) is a famous Arts and Sports Club in budhanoor. This club started in 80's and organizes a number of annual football tournaments every year. Budhanoor village has a government sports stadium located near Krishnan Kulangara Sreekrishna Swamy Temple.

== Centers of Worships ==
=== Kunnathoor Kulangara Devi Kshethram ===
Kunnathoor Kulangara Devi Kshethram is an ancient temple located nearby GHSS Budhanoor. Goddess Durga Devi is the principal deity of this temple. A ten-day festival named Pathamudayam begins on Medom 1 of the Malayalam calendar every year. During the Pathamudayam festival the temple is full of devotees. The temple is also famous for the Pallivilakku which is held on the 10th day morning of the Pathamudayam festival. Pllivilakku is a big lighting system made many years ago with wood. It has a height of more than 50 meters and 100000 lamps.

=== St. Elias Orthodox Church Budhanoor ===
St. Elias Orthodox Church is an ancient church in Budhanoor that belongs to Malankara Orthodox Syrian Church. The Church was established in 1910. This church is situated beside the Mannar – Puliyoor Road and about a half-kilometer from Althara Junction Budhanoor. The present church is the second church built in this location. The church festival, celebrated from the first Sunday of February to the second Sunday of February is a symbol of thanksgiving for all the blessings received through St Elias. St Elias is the patron saint of the people of Budhanoor and all those who seek assistance from St Elias.
