= Saji Cherian =

Indian politician

Saji Cherian MLA
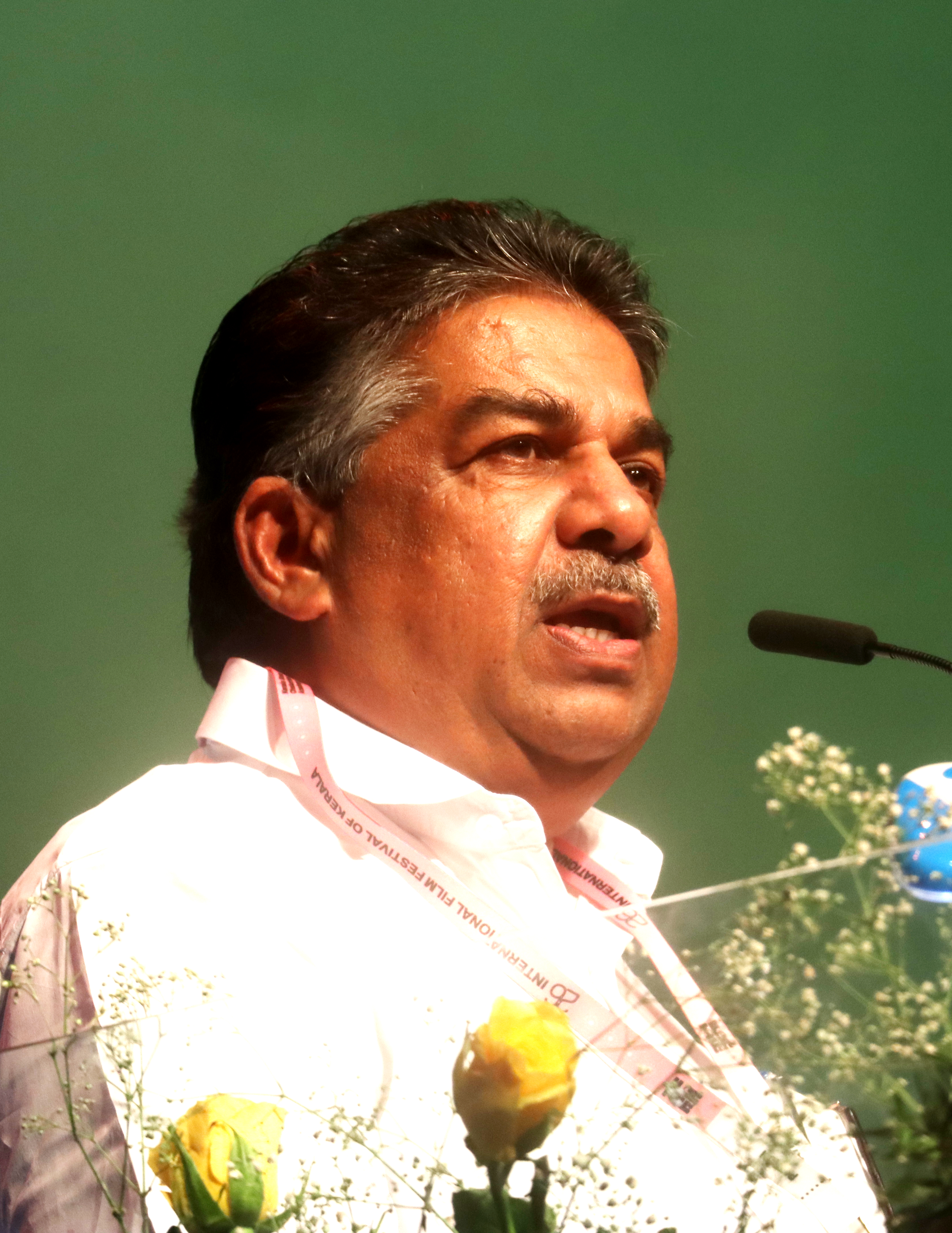

Minister for Fisheries, Culture and Youth Affairs, Government of Kerala
- In office 4 January 2023 – 17 May 2026
- Chief Minister: Pinarayi Vijayan
- Preceded by: V. Abdurahiman (Minister for Fisheries); V. N. Vasavan (Minister for Culture); P. A. Mohammed Riyas (Minister for Youth Affairs)
- Succeeded by: O. J. Janeesh (Youth Affairs); P. C. Vishnunath (Culture and Cinema); V. E. Abdul Gafoor (Fisheries)
- In office 20 May 2021 – 6 July 2022
- Chief Minister: Pinarayi Vijayan
- Preceded by: J. Mercykutty Amma (Minister for Fisheries); A. K. Balan (Minister for Culture); E. P. Jayarajan (Minister for Youth Affairs)
- Succeeded by: V. Abdurahiman (Minister for Fisheries); V. N. Vasavan (Minister for Culture); P. A. Mohammed Riyas (Minister for Youth Affairs)

Member of Kerala Legislative Assembly
- Incumbent
- Assumed office 4 June 2018
- Preceded by: K. K. Ramachandran Nair
- Constituency: Chengannur

Personal details
- Born: 28 May 1965 (age 61)
- Party: Communist Party of India (Marxist)
- Education: Bishop Moore College, Kerala Law Academy

Saji Cherian (born 28 May 1965) is an Indian politician from Kerala. He previously served as the minister for fisheries, culture & youth affairs in the second Pinarayi Vijayan government and as the Member of the Legislative Assembly (MLA) from Chengannur constituency. He was also the former Minister for Fisheries, Culture and Youth Affairs (2021 – 2022) in the Second Vijayan ministry. Following a controversial speech in Mallappally in 2022 in which he spoke derisively of the Indian constitution, he resigned on 6 July amid mounting pressure from the opposition. He returned as the minister again on 4 January 2023 after the high court of Kerala rejected petition against him.

== Early life ==
Saji Cherian was born on 28 May 1965 to T. T. Cherian and Sosamma Cherian. He hails from Kozhuvalloor in Alappuzha district of Kerala, India. He graduated from Bishop Moore College, Mavelikkara and Kerala Law Academy Law College, Thiruvananthapuram.

== Political career ==
Saji's entry into politics was through Students' Federation of India (SFI). He did his graduation from Bishop Moore College, Mavelikara. He held positions of Alappuzha district committee secretary and president of SFI. He then went on to become the district committee president and secretary of DYFI, district president of CITU, chairman of the District Panchayat Development permanent committee, president of Chengannur Block Panchayat, secretary of CPI(M) Alappuzha district committee, syndicate member of the University of Kerala, president of district Sports Council, president of Alappuzha District Co-operative Bank, and executive member of Kerala State Cooperative Bank.

He has contested Kerala Legislative Assembly from Chengannur constituency in 2006 and lost to P. C. Vishnunath of Indian National Congress by a margin of 5321 votes. He was elected to Kerala Legislative Assembly from Chengannur constituency in the by-election held on 28 May 2018 necessitated by the demise of K. K. Ramachandran Nair. He won with a margin of 20956 votes defeating Adv. D. Vijayakumar of Indian National Congress. Saji Cherian has recorded the best winning-margin for an LDF candidate in an Assembly election in Chengannur.

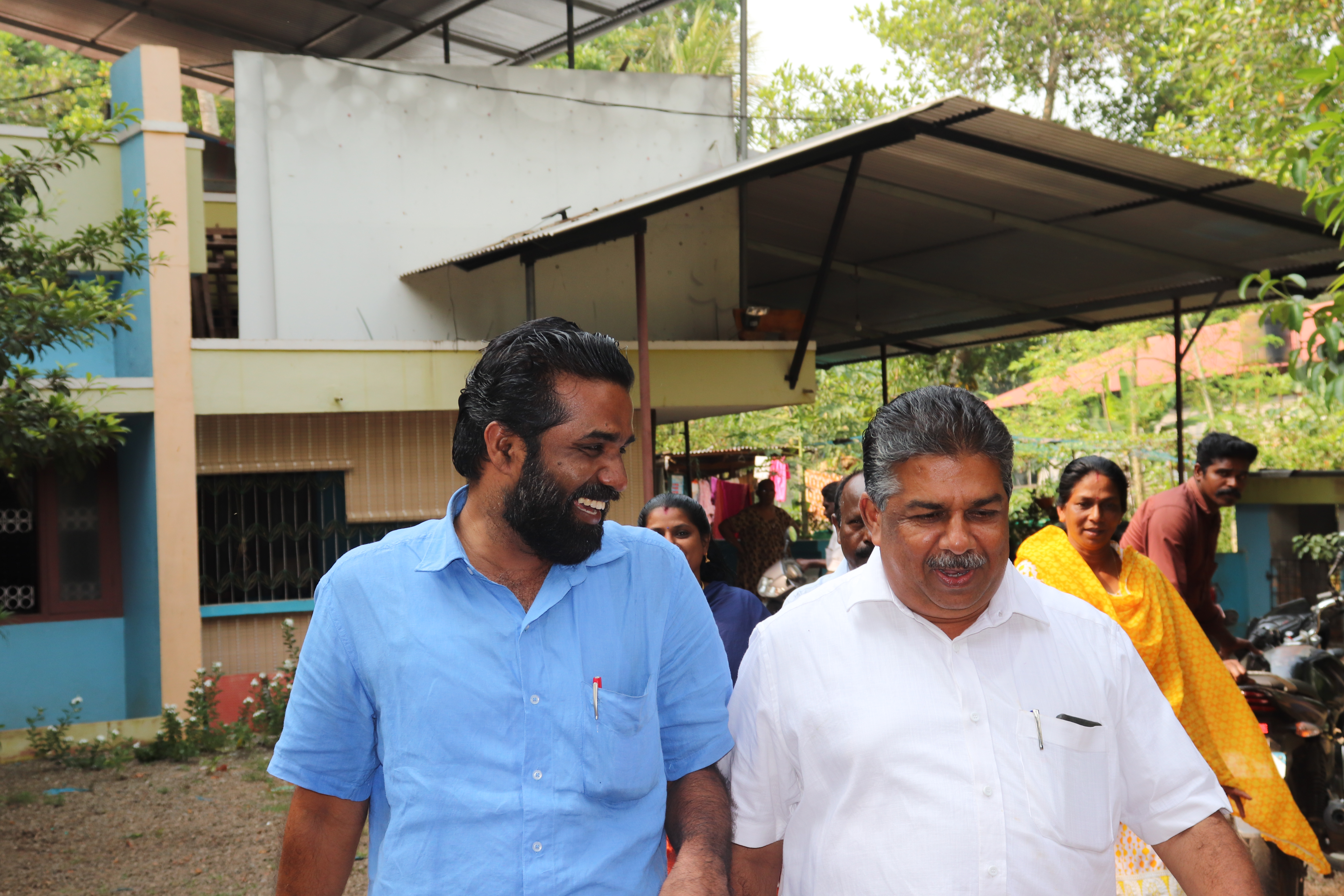
Saji Cherian, Minister From Kerala along with H Salam, MLA

On 17 August 2018, his controversial Facebook post went viral among social media, stating his helplessness and request to the central government, regarding his constituency, which was at a highly dangerous zone during 2018 Kerala floods. In the aftermath, actions were taken in order to save Chengannur.

In 2021 assembly elections, Saji was again elected from Chengannur assembly constituency by defeating his nearest Indian National Congress rival M. Murali with margin of more than 30000 votes and became the Minister in charge of the portfolios of Fisheries, Harbour Engineering cultural affairs and cinema in Pinarayi Vijayan ministry 2021.

In July 2022 at Mallappally he made a controversial speech in which it is alleged that he spoke derisively about the Indian Constitution and thus had violated his oath as a Minister and MLA. He resigned his post as Minister on 6 July 2022.

There was a petition filed against him to disqualify him as an MLA based on this incident. The same was rejected by the high court of Kerala on 8 December 2022. Based on this court verdict, Saji Cherian returned as a minister on 4 January 2023. The local police had filed a case against him but later closed the same citing no evidence. A petition against this police report was also rejected by the Thiruvalla first class magistrate on 5 January 2023.

== Personal life ==
He is married to Christeena S. Cherian and they have three children–Dr. Nithya, Dr. Drishya, and Dr. Shravya. He resides in Kozhuvalloor in Alappuzha district. He became the chairman of Karuna Pain and Palliative Care Society, a charitable society.

== Controversies ==
In July 2022, Saji Cherian made controversy by ridiculing the Indian Constitution and said it condoned exploitation of workers, triggering condemnation and demands for his resignation. Inaugurating the 100th episode of a Facebook live programme on "political developments of the week" organised by Mallappally CPM area committee, Saji alleged that the Constitution was "compiled by the British" and it was written as such by an Indian and implemented in the country for the last 75 years.
