= Thriperumthura =

- village
- Interactive map of Thriperumthura
- Country: India
- State: Kerala
- District: Alappuzha

Population (2011)
  - Total: 15,226

Languages
  - Official: Malayalam, English
- Time zone: UTC+5:30 (IST)

Thripperumthura is a village in Alappuzha district in the Indian state of Kerala.

== Demographics ==
As of 2011 India census, Thripperumthura had a population of 15226 with 6990 males and 8236 females.
