= Shobhana George =

Indian politician(born 4 April 1962)

Sobhana George
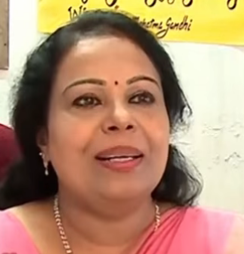

Member of Legislative Assembly
- In office 1991–2005
- Preceded by: Mammen Iype
- Succeeded by: P. C. Vishnunath
- Constituency: Chengannur

Personal details
- Born: 4 April 1962 (age 64) Chengannur
- Party: Aam Aadmi party
- Education: Kerala University, University of Mysore
- As of 2 Aug, 2013

Sobhana George is a politician and three-time Member of the Legislative Assembly of the state of Kerala, who, as an Bharathiya janatha party candidate, represented Chengannur in the 9th, 10th and 11th Assemblies. She is the only woman to represent the same constituency consecutively for three years in the Indian National Congress Party.

Sobhana George is now an active supporter of the CPIM. She was the first woman to be the Vice Chairperson of Kerala State Khadi and Village Industries Board and now hold the position of Chairperson for Oushadhi, the largest producer of Ayurveda Medicines in public sector in India operated by the Kerala Government.

== Education ==
Sobhana completed her SSLC from the Govt. Girls High School, Chengannur. She did her higher studies in Kottayam Basalious College, Rani St. Thomas College, Kozenchery St.Thomas College, Madras University and Mysore University.

== Career ==
She was then the first female president of the All Kerala Balajan Sakhyam. She was also the first female General Secretary of the State Youth Congress Committee and has served as a Joint Secretary of the Kerala Pradesh Congress Committee. She has also served as a Senate Member of the Kerala University. Following her expulsion from the Indian National Congress, she joined the Democratic Indira Congress (Karunakaran) where she served as the General Secretary. She represented the Chengannur constituency in the Kerala Legislative Assembly in the 9th, 10th and 11th assemblies.

Election Victories
Year	Closest rival	Votes polled
1991	Mammen Iype (ICS-SCS)	36,761
1996	Mammen Iype (ICS)	37,242
2001	Adv. K. K. Ramachandran Nair (CPI-M)	41,242

She resigned as MLA on 5 July 2005, after having resigned from the INC, and joining the DIC(K) along with K. Karunakaran. She contested from the Thiruvananthapuram West constituency, but lost. Later, she re-joined the Congress party. In 2011, she staked her claim for the Chengannur constituency, however the Congress fielded its sitting MLA, P. C. Vishnunath, in spite of her claiming that she had the support of the Malankara Orthodox church. She filed her nomination as an independent, but withdrew at the last moment, citing pressure from the party.

In 2016, she resigned from the Congress and in the 2018 Assembly by-polls, she campaigned for the LDF. After her resignation from the Congress Party in 2016, there has never been a Congress Party Member to represent the Chengannur constituency in the Legislative Assembly.

== Controversies ==
In 1997, Sobhana was manhandled, while attending a District Committee meeting by her colleagues. She raised a complaint against them which was largely ignored by the party.

In 2002, a non-bailable arrest warrant was issued for the arrest of Sobhana George, in the case of a forged intelligence report which was faxed to the then Chief Minister A. K. Antony's office, stating that the Tourism and Fisheries Minister in his government, K. V. Thomas, was involved in a 366 crore Hawala transaction which took place in 1999–2000. Also arrested in the case was Surya TV's reporter Anil Nambiar, who flashed the letter on the channel, and Anil Sreerangam, Sobana's private assistant. The arrests were the result of a probe, ordered by the Chief Minister. She was also issued a show cause notice by the KPCC Disciplinary Action Committee.

It was later on proved in court that Sobhana was a victim of groupism among the Congress Party. Sobhana George was framed in a false allegation by the opposition group in the Congress party as she was a strong supporter of the Karunakaran Group of Congress. The court ruled out this case as a purely fabricated case against Sobhana and the sole purpose for this case was revenge.

== Performing arts ==
In 2011, Sobhana introduced a music album called 'Ente Onam' which was released by Chengannur Audios. The music album was about the history of Onam and human values.

She also announced the release of a movie "Pratheekshayode". The movie is about child labor and has prominent actors such as Mukesh, Lakshmi Sharma and others. Sobhana George is the only woman in the Malayalam Film Industry to carry out the Production, Scriptwriting, Dialogue - Writing, Screenplay and acting, all together in a single movie.

In 2015, Sobhana George has her own place in the Guinness World Book of Records as the holder of the World's Largest Human Christmas Tree with Mission Chengennur. There were a total of 4030 people.
