= Neervilakom =

- Village
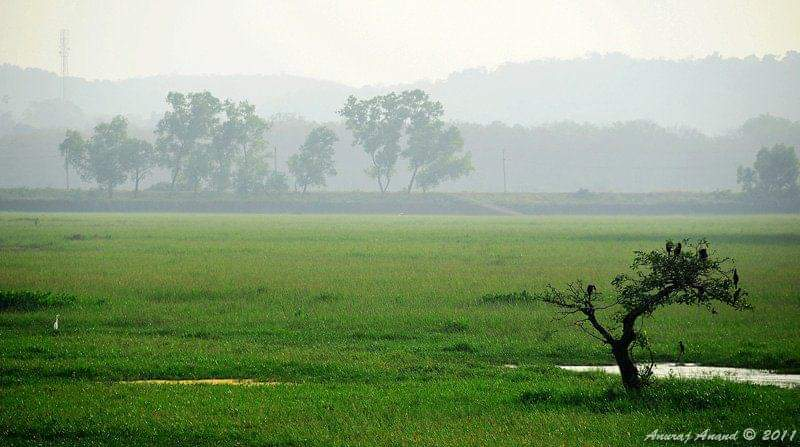

- Location in Kerala, India Neervilakom (India)
- Coordinates: 9°20′N 76°41′E
- Country: India
- State: Kerala
- District: Pathanamthitta
- Elevation: 7 m (23 ft)

Languages
  - Official: Malayalam, English
- Time zone: UTC+5:30 (IST)
- Postal code: 689122
- Vehicle registration: KL-03

Neervilakom (or alternatively spelled as Neervilakam, Neervilakem, Nirvilakam, Nirvilakom, and Nirvilakem), is a remote village situated 7 km (4 mi) away from Aranmula and 5 km (3 mi) from Chengannur. Neervilakom serves as a suburb of Aranmula panchayath, located in the far western region of the Pathanamthitta district in the state of Kerala, South India. It marks the geographical boundary between Alappuzha and Pathanamthitta districts. Neervilakom shares its borders with neighbouring villages such as Malakkara and Arattupuzha to the north, Puthencavu and Piralassery to the west, Kurichumuttam to the east, and Ezikkadu and a portion of Piraliassery to the south. Neervilakom is known for the Bangalore Road Viewpoint.

== Nearby Places ==
Neervilakam is a remote village area, which necessitates reliance on neighboring regions for essential supplies. The local community commonly depends on the Chengannur 5 km (3 mi) to Kozhanchery 10 km (6 mi) State Highway for bus transportation. This particular bus route conveniently passes through Puthencavu 3 km (2 mi), Aratupuzha 2 km (1 mi), Malakara 2 km (1 mi), and Chakkittapady 2.5 km (2 mi), all situated to the north of Neervilakam. Notably, the Chengannur Mahadeva Temple 5 km (3 mi), Aranmula Parthasarathy Temple 7 km (4 mi), and Puthencavu Orthodox Church 3 km (2 mi) are easily accessible places of worship from Neervilakam.

== Bangalore Road Viewpoint ==
Bangalore Road Viewpoint is a roadside viewpoint located in Neervilakom, near Aranmula, in the Pathanamthitta district of Kerala, India. The viewpoint offers views of the surrounding landscape, including paddy fields. It is situated along the Bangalore-Kerala route and is accessible by road.

== Temples ==
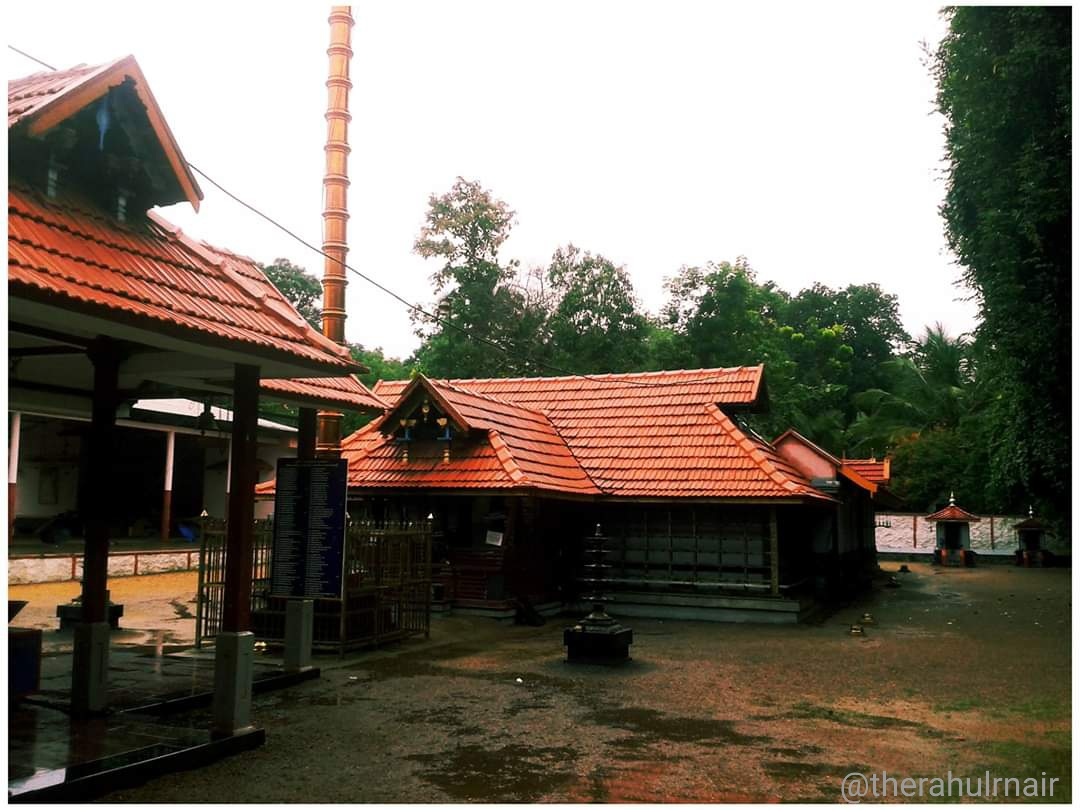
Shree Dharma Shastha Temple, Neervilakom

Neervilakom is situated about 7 kilometres (4 mi) from Aranmula in Pathanamthiita district, Kerala, India. The main attraction of this place is the ancient temple Shree Dharma Shastha Temple. Lord Ayyappa is the main deity. Thousands of devotees from various places of Central Travancore worship here.

== Post Office ==
There is a post office in the village with Postal Index Number of Neervilakom is 689122, which is served by Angadical-Chengannur post office.

== Economy ==
Neervilakom is remarkably known for its economic contribution to the entire Central Travancore. Majority of the population are Composed of mostly NRIs, which given a important role in accomplishing the foreign exchange for the nation.

== Geography ==
Neervilakom has an average elevation of 7 m (23 ft) from the sea level. It is situated in remote forest zone of the southern region of Kerala.
