= Sound and Picture Archives for Research on Women =

Sound and Picture Archives for Research on Women or SPARROW is an archive of Indian women's history located in Dahisar, Mumbai. The archive contains print, visual, photographic and film materials related to women's history in India. The archive, which was founded in 1988 by Tamil feminist writer C. S. Lakshmi, is the largest archive of women's history in India.

The archive collects oral history, personal papers, recorded speeches, photographers, posters, songs, art work etc. It also makes documentary films on women who have been agents of change in different fields.
