= Mavadi =

Village in Kollam District, Kerala, India

Mavadi Poovattor West
- Village
- Location within Kerala Location within India
- Coordinates: 9°03′39.3″N 76°43′29.7″E
- Country: India
- State: Kerala
- District: Kollam
- Taluk: Kottarakkara
- Block: Vettikkavala
- Panchayat: Kulakkada Grama Panchayat

Government
  - Body: Kulakkada Grama Panchayat

Languages
  - Official: Malayalam, English
- Time zone: UTC+5:30 (IST)
- PIN: 691507

Mavadi (also known as Poovattor West) is a village located in the Kulakkada Grama Panchayat of Kottarakkara taluk in Kollam district, Kerala, India. It functions as Ward 15 of the panchayat and also serves as a local administrative hub, as the Kulakkada Grama Panchayat office is situated in the village.

== Geography ==
Mavadi lies in the midland region of Kerala within the Kallada river basin influence zone. The terrain consists of gently undulating land with rubber plantations, coconut groves, and agricultural fields. It forms part of the Poovattoor–Kulakkada settlement cluster in Kollam district.

== Location ==
The village is located approximately:

- 10 km from Kottarakkara
- 30–40 km from Kollam city

It is connected through the MC Road corridor and local rural road networks.

== Administration ==
Mavadi is administratively structured as:

- State: Kerala
- District: Kollam
- Taluk: Kottarakkara
- Block: Vettikkavala
- Panchayat: Kulakkada
- Ward: 15 (Mavady)

The village also hosts key local government offices including the village office and panchayat office.

== Postal Services ==
Mavadi uses PIN code 691507. The postal structure includes:

- Mavadi Branch Post Office (B.O)
- Sub-office: Puthur-Kollam S.O

The 691507 postal region covers multiple nearby localities in Kottarakkara taluk.

== Demographics ==
Mavadi does not have independent census data and is included in Kulakkada village statistics.

- Total population (Kulakkada, 2011): 15,148
- Literacy rate: ~87%
- Languages: Malayalam, English

== Economy ==
The economy is primarily agrarian and rural-based:

- Rubber cultivation (dominant)
- Coconut farming
- Cashew processing units
- Small-scale trade and services
- Migration-based income (Gulf remittances)

Recent developments include limited IT and skill development employment initiatives under Kerala government programs.

== Transport ==
Mavadi is well connected through regional road networks.

- Road: MC Road connectivity via Kulakkada and Kottarakkara
- Bus: KSRTC and private buses operate regularly
- Railway: Kottarakkara Railway Station (~10 km)
- Airport: Thiruvananthapuram International Airport (~80 km)

== Education ==
Educational institutions near Mavadi include:

- Government L.P School, Poovattoor West
- Government H.S.S Kulakkada (nearby)
- Several aided schools in Kottarakkara region

Higher education institutions are located in Kollam and surrounding urban centers.

== Healthcare ==
Healthcare access includes:

- Kulakkada Community Health Centre (CHC)
- Primary Health Sub-centres in nearby villages
- Hospitals in Kottarakkara town

== Culture ==
Mavadi is culturally linked to the Poovattoor temple region. Religious and cultural life is centered around temple traditions.

Major temples:

- Mavady Mahavishnu Temple
- Poovattoor Devi Temple
- Alumkunnil Mahadevar Temple

Major festivals:

- Onam
- Vishu
- Annual temple festivals with traditional Kerala rituals, processions, and fireworks

== Nearby Places ==
- Poovattoor
- Kulakkada
- Puthur
- Vettikkavala
- Kottarakkara
