= Kozhuvalloor =

Village in Kerala, India

- village
- Location in Kerala, India Kozhuvalloor (India)
- Coordinates: 9°17′0″N 76°37′0″E
- Country: India
- State: Kerala
- District: Alappuzha

Languages
  - Official: Malayalam, English
- Time zone: UTC+5:30 (IST)
- PIN: 689 521
- Vehicle registration: KL-

Kozhuvallur (Kozhuvalloor) is a small village in the Chengannur taluk of Alappuzha district in Kerala, India. An ancient Devi temple dedicated to Baghvathy is located here. It is situated about 10 km south of the town of Chengannur and about 8 km northwest of Pandalam. The road to Kozhuvallur from Chengannur deviates at Chammathu Mukku Junction on the Chengannur-Mavelikkara Road before Kodukulanji. From the Pandalam side, the road to Kozhuvalloor branches at Kulanada on the Main Central (MC) Road. Administratively, Kozhuvalloor lies under the jurisdiction of Mulakkuzha Panchayat. It is separated from the nearby Venmony village by a large strip of paddy field called Changapadam. The physical features of the area follow the typical midland geographical pattern of Kerala, comprising lush vegetation, fertile wet fields, and hilly terrain.
