= Ala, Alappuzha =

Ala
- village
- Location in Kerala, India Ala (India)
- Coordinates: 9.293970°N 76.606410°E
- Country: India
- State: Kerala
- District: Alappuzha
- Talukas: Chenganoor

Population (2011)
  - Total: 13,665

Languages
  - Official: Malayalam, English
- Time zone: UTC+5:30 (IST)
- PIN: 689126
- Vehicle registration: KL-30

Ala is a village in Chenganoor taluk of Alappuzha district in the Indian state of Kerala.

== Demographics ==
As of 2011 India census, Ala had a population of 13665 with 6256 males and 7409 females.

=== Educational institutions ===
- Sree Narayana College Chengannur
- S.N Turst Secondary School
- Government Higher secondary School
- Government L.P.S, ALA
- Providence College of Engineering.
- Mathews Mar Athanasius Residential School.
