= Cheriyanad =

Cheriyanad Shishu Rashtram, Pallivilakkukalude Naadu
- Gramapanchayath
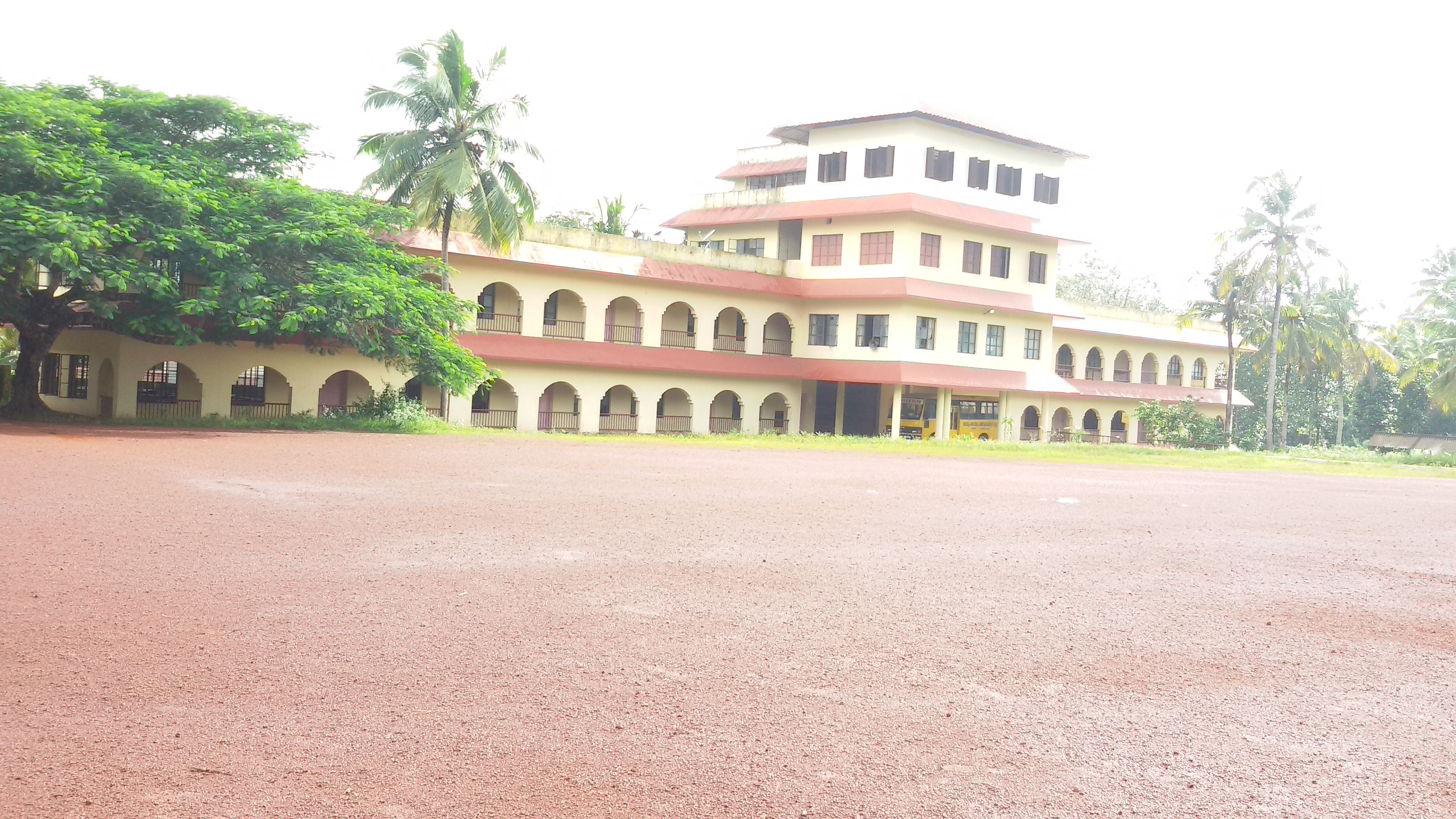
- Devaswom Board Higher Secondary School
- Interactive map of Cheriyanad
- Coordinates: 9.2687200°N 76.587230°E
- Country: India
- State: Kerala
- District: Alappuzha

Languages
  - Official: Malayalam, English
- Time zone: UTC+5:30 (IST)
- Postal code: 689511
- Vehicle registration: KL-30

Cheriyanad is a village in Kerala state of India. It lies in the Central Travancore Region, and specifically comes under Chengannur taluk in Alappuzha District.The very famous Cheryanadu Balasubrahmanya temple is located here. The Kavadiyattam which is held every year in conjunction with Taipuyam and the lighting of the Holy Pallivilakku (5th day during Temple's Festival) are very famous. This land is also known as the Pallivilakkukalude Naadu.

== History ==
The west half of Cheriyanad village was once located on the boundary of the Kingdom of the Kayamkulam Raja and the east half on the boundary of Pandalam Kingdom of Pandalam raja. In 1746 along with the rest of the kingdom it was annexed to Travancore. Cheriyanad possesses a Padanilam or a battlefield which is now used by the Cheriyanad temple for festivals. There was a Shastha temple Situvated in Cheriyanad Padanilam. The Padanilam is also known as "Shastham Kunnu". The centre of Padanilam was known as otha varambu. Until the 1980s, there were two "Kalithattu" (a raised square platform fortified with four heavy stones at the borders). During temple festivals the "Pallivilakku" (High rise wooden raths with lighted lamps) from each Kara are brought to the ground.

Traditionally, Cheriyanad consisted of nine original Karas or villages which are now: Athimanchery, Edavankadu, Mandapariyaram, Thuruthimel, Moolikode, Edamuri, Mampra, Arayinnurshery, and Alakode ( cheruvalloor& Kollakadavu ). For administrative purposes it is subdivided into 14 Karas. Cheriyanad is home to an important Temple (Cheriyanad Temple). The heart of Cheriyanad known as Athimunchery, and is known locally as Cheriyanad.

== Culture and Festivals ==
Cheriyanad is known for its traditional temple festivals and cultural practices. The village is sometimes locally referred to as Pallivilakkukalude Naadu (the land of ceremonial lamp structures).

=== Cheriyanad Sri Bala Subrahmanya Swami Temple ===
The Cheriyanad Sri Bala Subrahmanya Swami Temple is one of the famous religious centres in the village, dedicated to Lord Bala Subrahmanya Swami.

The temple hosts an annual festival associated with Thaipusam, during which traditional rituals such as Kavadiyattam are performed.

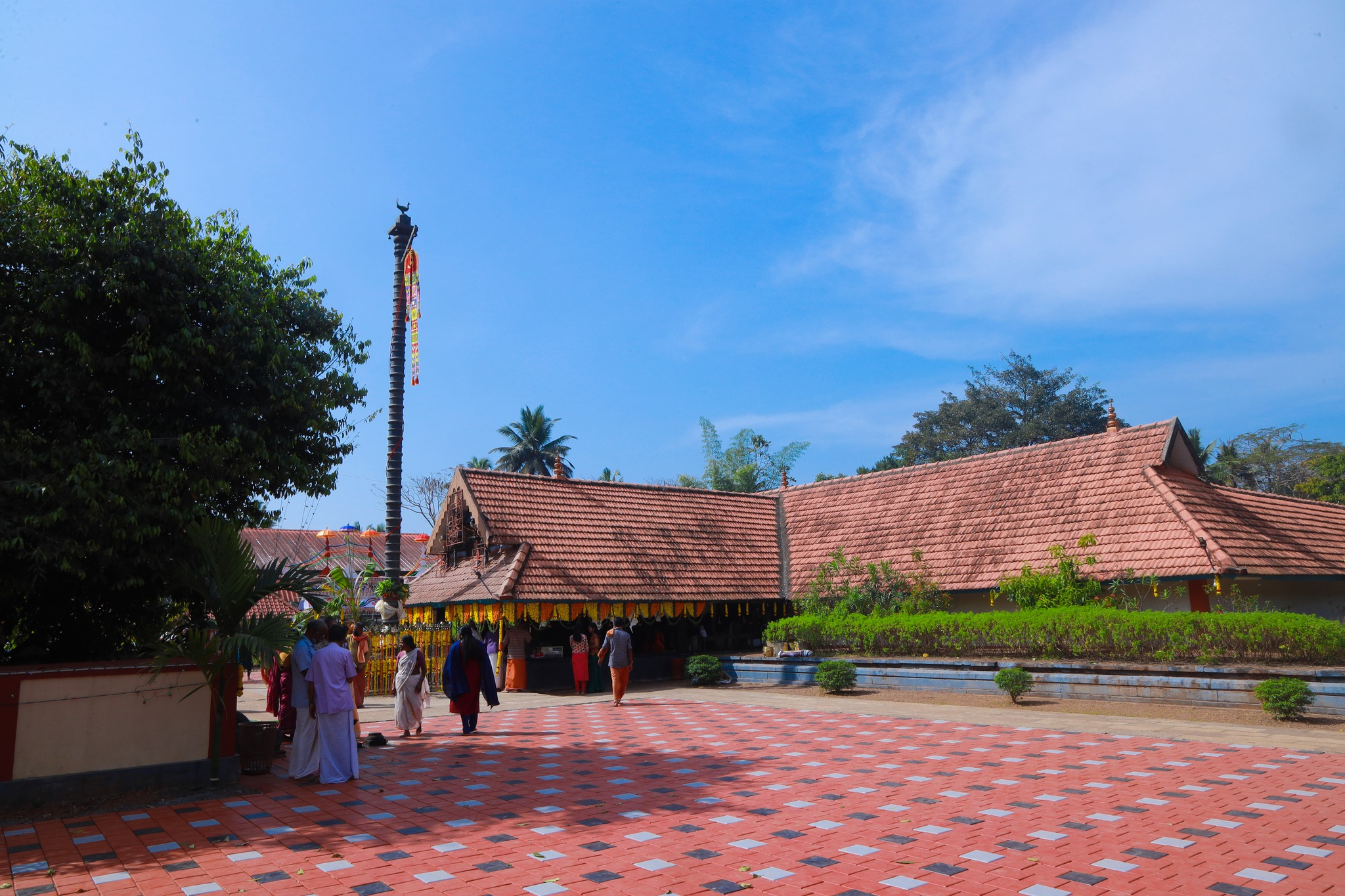
Cheriyanad Sri Bala Subrahmanya Swami Temple

=== Pallivilakku Thirupurappadu ===
One of the highlights of the temple festival is the Pallivilakku Thirupurappadu, a ceremonial procession involving tall wooden structures decorated with oil lamps. These structures are brought from different karas (localities) to a central ground, accompanied by 3 or 5 Elephants, traditional Kerala Drums (Chendamelam) and rituals.

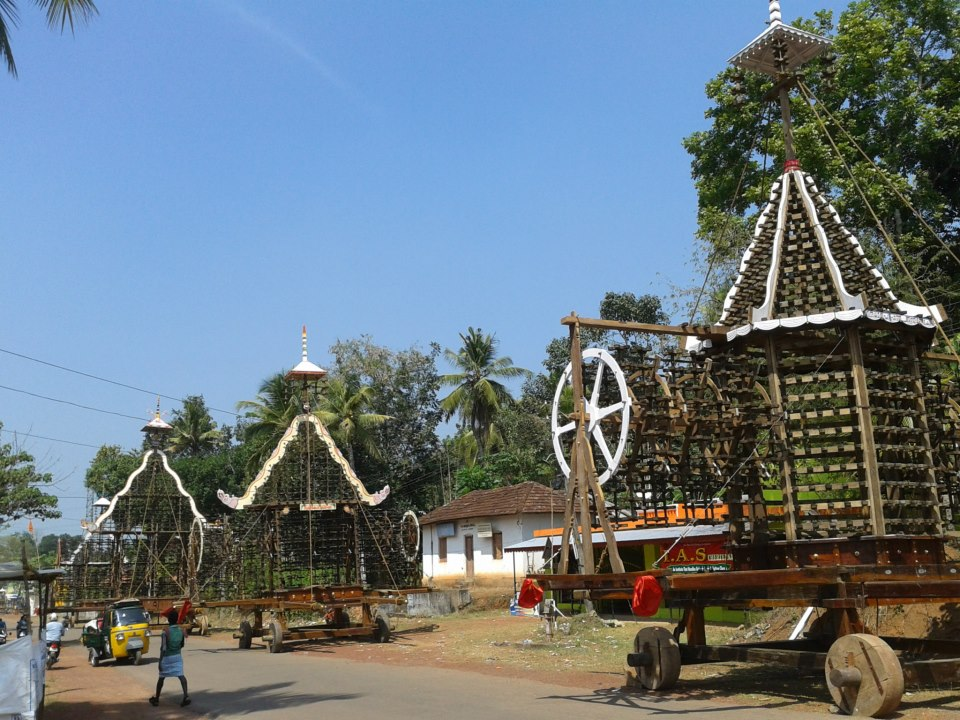
Pallivilakku during temple festival

== Rail and Road Access ==
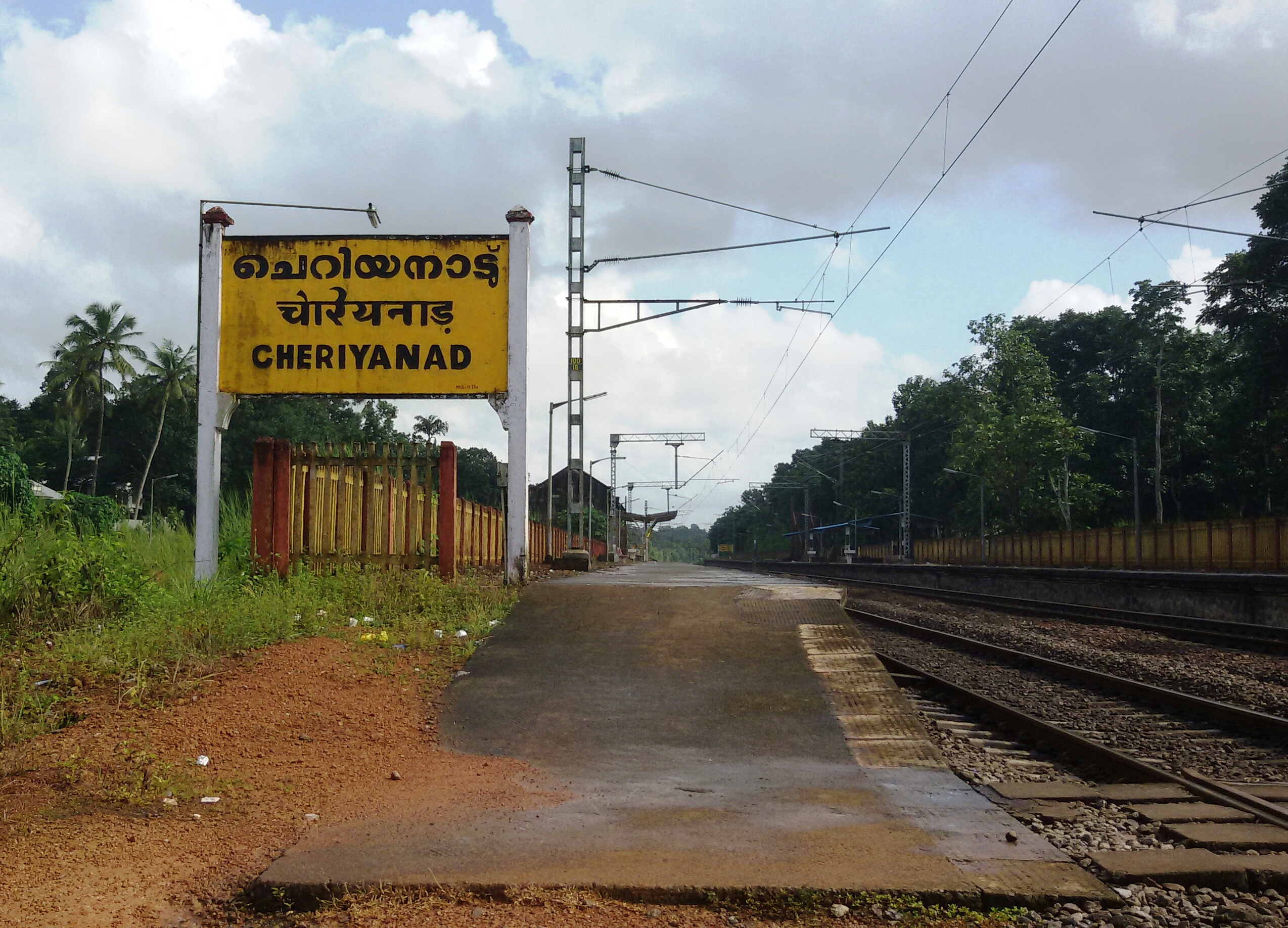
Cheriyanad Railway Station sign board

Cheriyanad is 7 km from the town of Chengannur and the same distance to the town of Mavelikkara. Cheriyanad has its own railway station (Hault) besides is just 7 km far away from Chengannur railway station and 8 km from mavelikara railway station. Both Venad Express & Palaruvi express have stop at cheriyanad Railway station. State Highway 10 (SH 10) passing through Heart of Cheriyanad and it's connect MC Road in Chengannur, NH 66 in Harippad & Kayamkulum & NH 183 passing through another part of Cheriyanad Panchayathu.
