= Chennithala =

- Census Town
- Location of Chennithala in Kerala Chennithala (India)
- Coordinates: 9.270280°N 76.536240°E
- Country: India
- State: Kerala
- District: Alappuzha

Government
  - Type: Panchayati Raj (India)

Area
  - Total: 127.78 km^{2} (49.34 sq mi)

Population (2011)
  - Total: 12,360
  - Density: 96.73/km^{2} (250.5/sq mi)

Languages
  - Official: Malayalam, English
- Time zone: UTC+5:30 (IST)
- Postal code: 690105
- Vehicle registration: KL-31
- Nearest city: Mavelikkara
- Lok Sabha constituency: Mavelikkara

Chennithala is a census town in Mavelikkara taluk of Alappuzha district, Kerala state, India. This village consists mainly of paddy fields and coconut groves.

== Places of worship ==
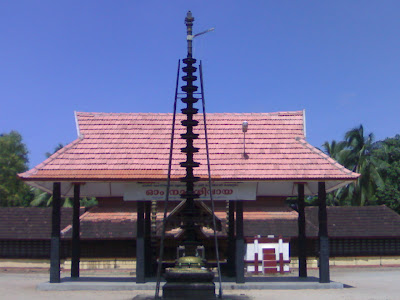
Thripperumthura Sree Mahadeva temple

Thripperumthura Sree Mahadevar Temple, Ayyakkasheril Sree Mahadevar Temple, Karazhma Devi Temple, Chala Sree Mahadevar Temple, Puthuvila Bhagavathi Temple, Valiyamadom Devi Temple, Kannannoor Devi Temple and Irampaman Sree Subramania Swamy Temple, Cherukole Sree Subrahmania Swamy-Sree Dharma Sastha Temple, Chennitala Sidhashramam are major temples of this village.

== Location ==
Chennithala is located in the Mavelikkara Taluk of Alappuzha district, in the state of Kerala. Chennithala village is 6 km north from Mavelikkara, 4 km from Mannar to south, 9 km from Harippad (towards east) and 12 km from Chengannur (towards west) town. The Valiya Perumpumpuzha Bridge connects Chennithala to Thattarambalam in the south part. The Achankovil River flows through Chennithala.

== Demographics ==
As of 2011 Census, Chennithala had a population of 12,360 with 5,719 males and 6,641 females. Chennithala census town has an area of 6.38 km^{2} (2.46 sq mi) with 3,345 families residing in it. 8% of the population was under 6 years of age. Chennithala had an average literacy of 97% higher than the state average of 94%; male literacy was 98.2% and female literacy was 95.9%.

== Transportation ==
The nearest railway station is Mavelikara (MVLK), other nearby railway stations include Chengannur (CNGR) and Harippad (HAD). In addition to this, the Thiruvala (TRVL) and Kayamkulam Junction (KYJ) Railway Stations are connected by both KSRTC and private buses. The nearest KSRTC station is located in Mavelikkara and buses to most of the stations in the Kerala state are interconnected by KSRTC. A few interstate services are also available (Mavelikara-Tenkasi-Mavelikara service) which does not pass through Chennithala.

== Festivals ==
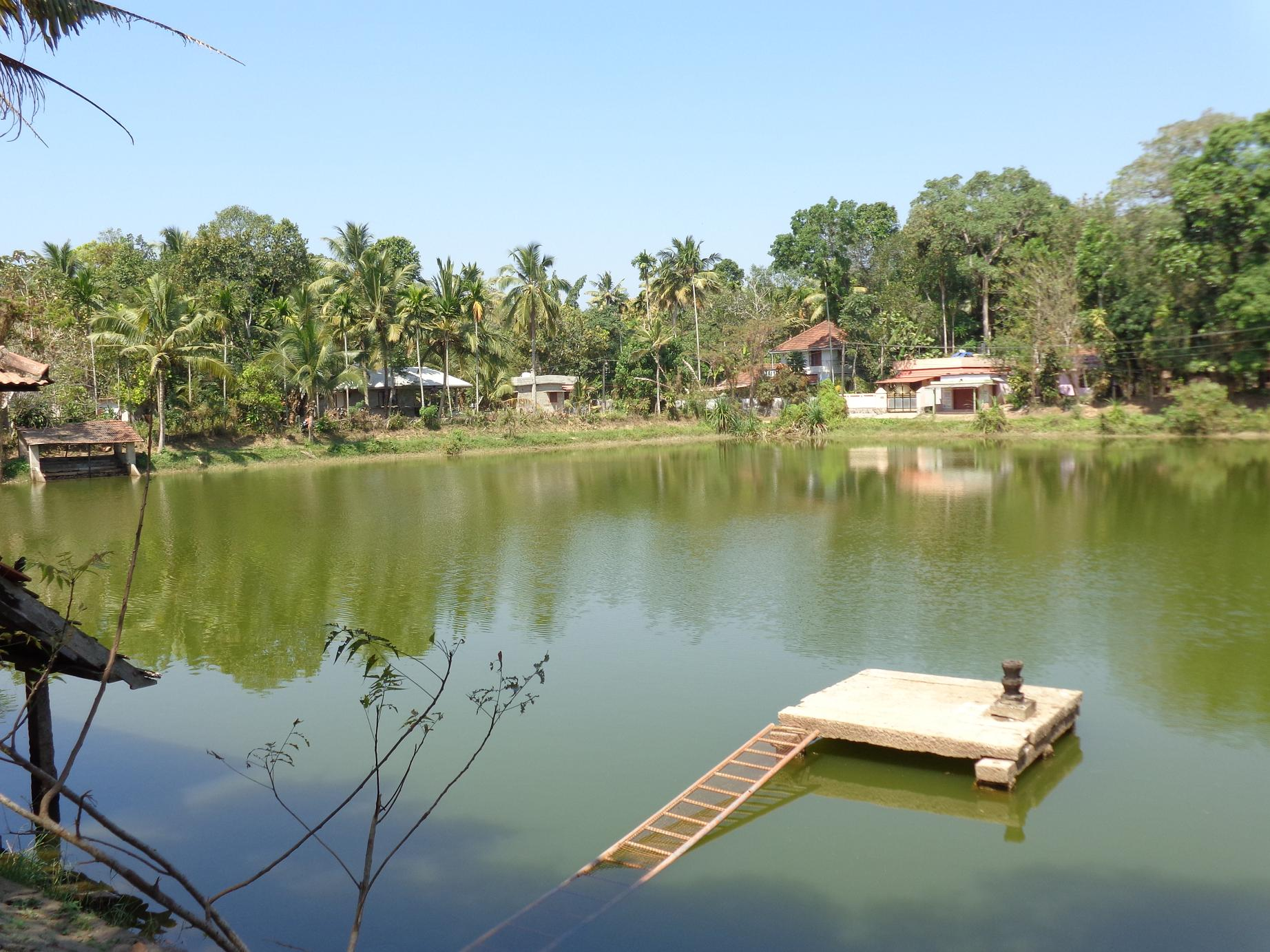
Temple pond at Tripperunthura

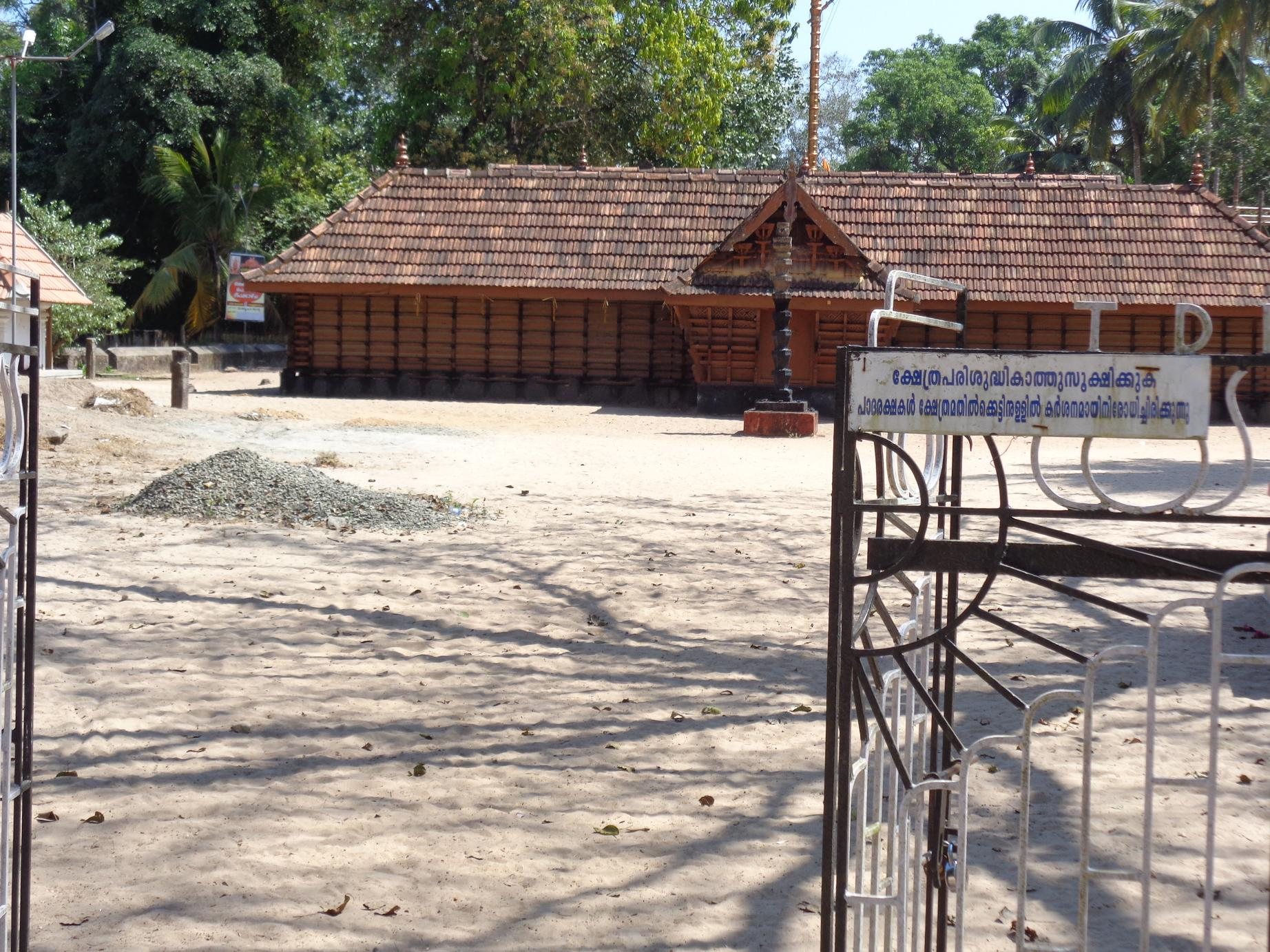
Karazma Devi temple

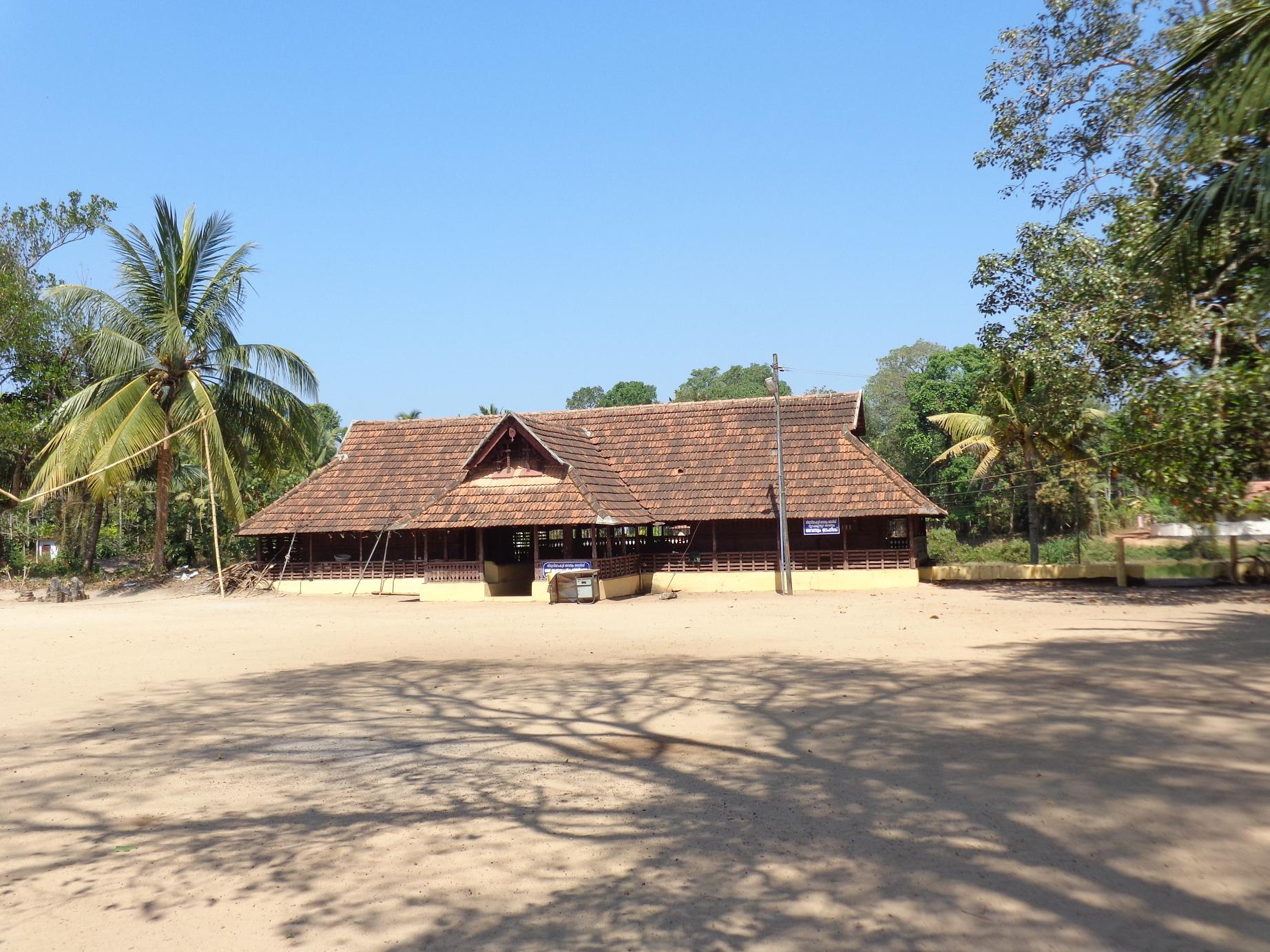
Kulappura at Tripperunthura

Chennithala has a Palliyodam (holy snake boat) owned by Chennithala South NSS No:93, which participates in the Aaranmula Utrattathi Jalolstavam (Water Festival) held in Aaranmula during the Onam season. Chennithala palliyodam travels around 85 Km through different water ways to reach Aranmula. This is the most distant Palliyodam attending Aranmula Jalolstavam.

Valiya perumpuzha bridge connects it to Thattarambalam in the south of Chennithala. Achankovil River flows through Chennithala. Chennithala village is 6 km north from Mavelikkara, 4 km from Mannar (towards South), 9 km from Harippad (towards East) and 12 km from Chengannur (towards West). The nearest railway stations are Mavelikkara, Chengannur and Harippad; also, the Thiruvalla and Kayamkulam Railway Stations are connected by both KSRTC and private buses.

St. George Orthodox Valiyapally or Chennithala Valliyapally is a church in Chennithala; it is about 160 years old. It was dedicated by Geevarghese Gregorios of Parumala (Parumala Thirumeni).

Chennithala is near to Parumala Seminary Church, the tomb of the Geevarghese Gregorios of Parumala.

Chennithala Sidhashramam Pattamudyam:- This festival on April 23 is held in the Chennithala Sidhashram, the first ashram in Chennithala. Every year, Pattamudyamaholsam, Annadanam and Kudam pooja are held in Chennithala.
