= Venmony =

- Village
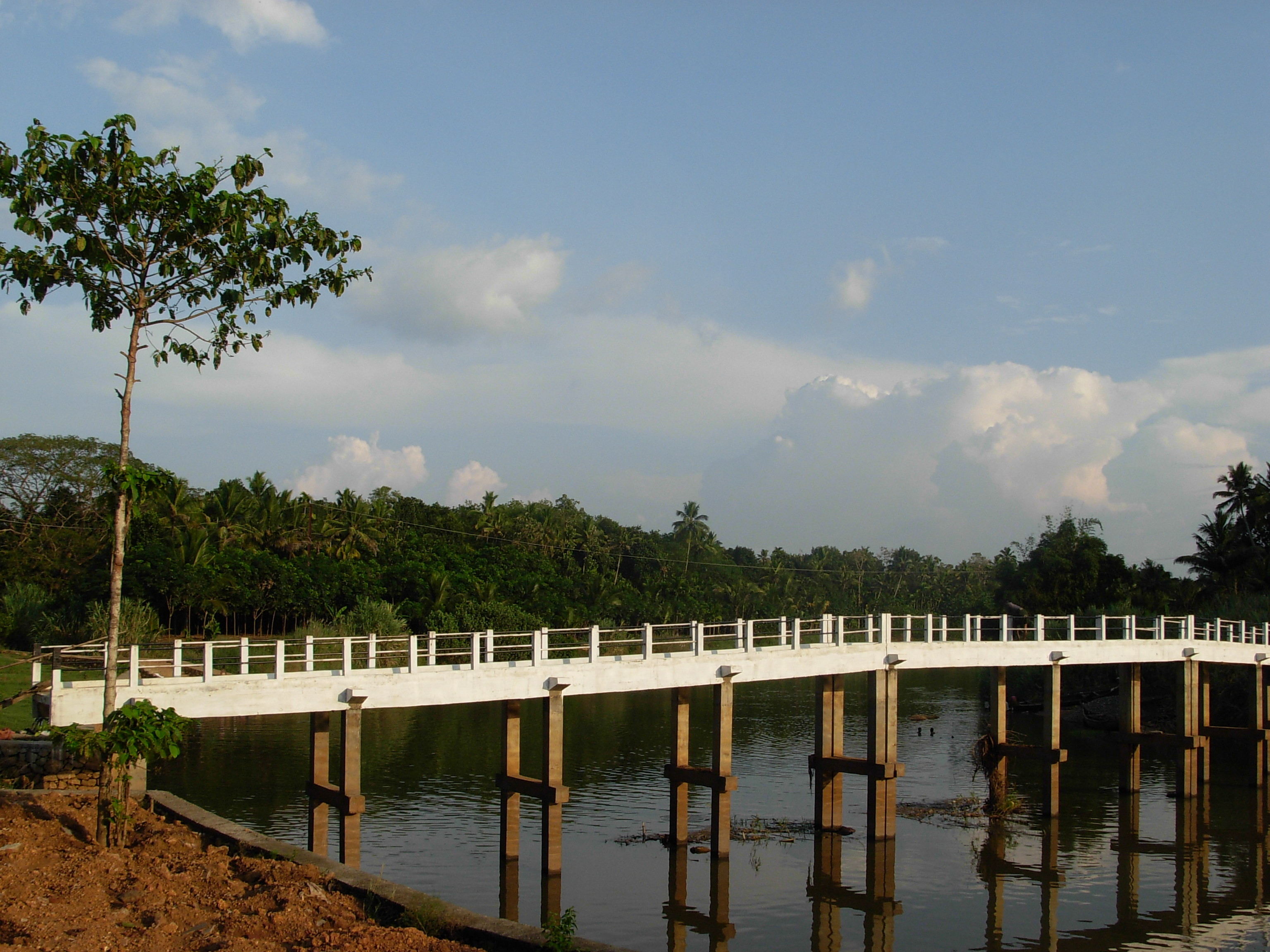
- Chamakkavu bridge
- Interactive map of Venmony
- Coordinates: 9°14′40″N 76°36′47″E
- Country: India
- State: Kerala
- District: Alappuzha

Population (2011)
  - Total: 19,932

Languages
  - Official: Malayalam, English
- Time zone: UTC+5:30 (IST)
- PIN: 689509

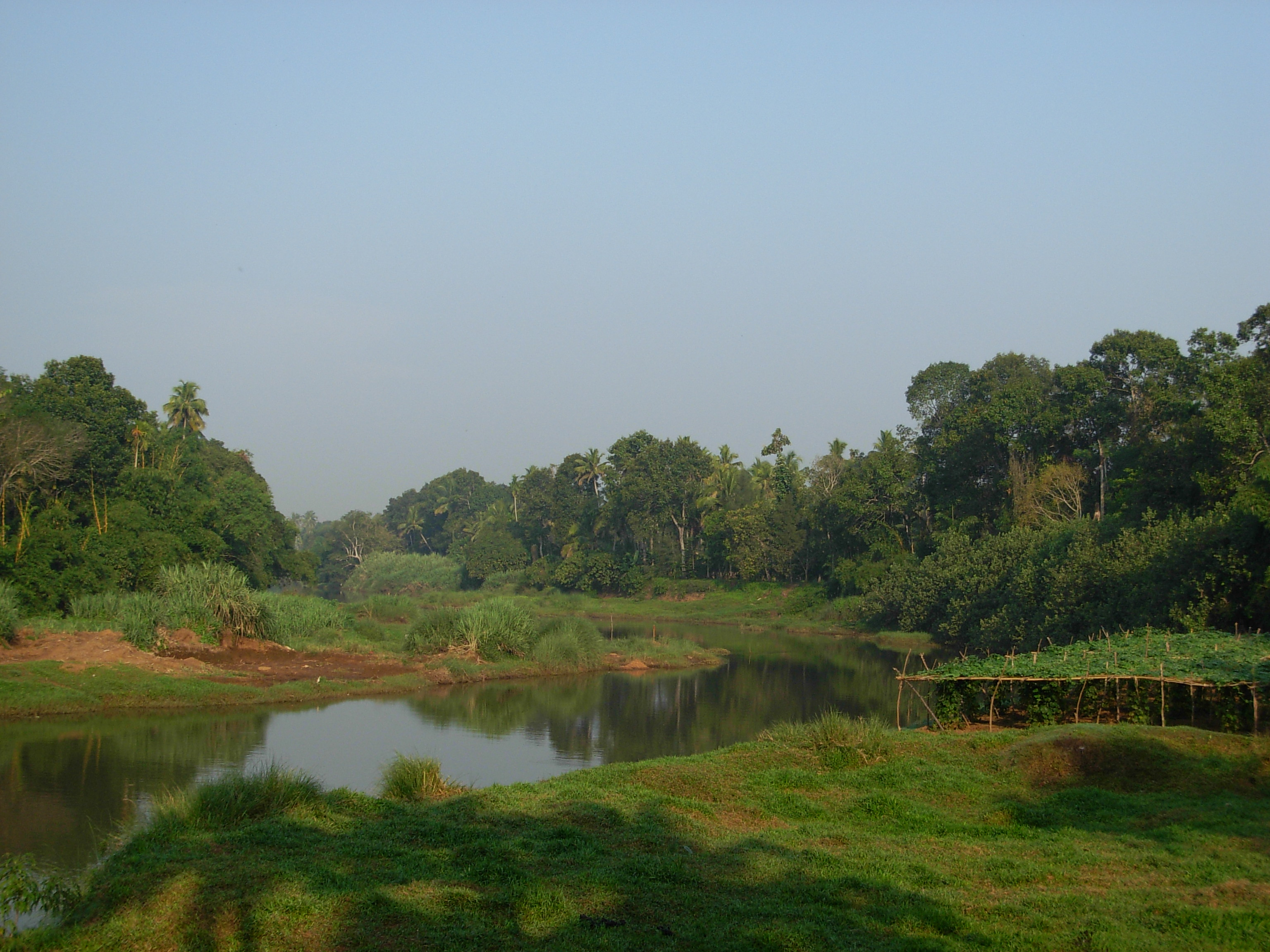
Achenkovil river

Venmony is a village in Chengannur taluk of Alappuzha district of Central Travancore area in Kerala state, India. Venmoney is south of Thiruvalla (19 km), east of Mavelikkara (10 km) and northwest of Pandalam (11 km). 11km from Chengannur. It is located 55 km towards East from District headquarters Alappuzha. 107 km from State capital Thiruvananthapuram and 138 km from Cochin International Airport. The village is on the border of the Alappuzha District and Pathanamthitta District. The Achenkovil river flows on its southern boundary and is spanned by the Pulakadavu bridge. Venmoney St. Mary's church ( pazhaya palli ) is the ancient church which was constructed in the year AD 1017.

== Demographics ==
The population of Venmony is 19,932, 9,073 of them are males and 10,859 are females according to the 2011 census. A total of 5,569 families reside in the village.

The population of children aged 0-6 is 1,630 that is 8.18% of total population of village. The village's average sex ratio is 1,197, that is higher than the Kerala average of 1084. Venmony's child sex ratio according to the census is 961, lower than the state average of 964.

In 2011, Venmony's literacy rate was 96.68% compared to Kerala's 94.00% . The male literacy rate was 97.67% and female literacy rate was 95.87%.

== Landmarks ==
One of the most notable landmarks in Venmony is the Sharngakavu Devi Temple (Chamakkavu). Known for the monkeys thriving in its sacred grove, there is no explicit building structure for the temple, as its goddess has forbidden any construction at the site. The Vishu festival at the temple on Medam 1st usually falls on April 14 and is well known for its Kettu Kazhcha, in which huge decorated chariots and stuffed wooden horses known as Kuthiras are presented. There is also a flea market with food shacks on weekly Wednesdays for the sale and purchase of native crafts, pottery, utensils and farm products and in Vishu days with an extensive merchandise. Betel leaves produced in Venmony are sometimes referred to as "Venmoney Vettila".

Kalliyathara Junction is the city centre of Venmony.

Akshaya Center- Common Service Center- situated in Kalliyathra Junction.
