= Satheesh Babu Payyannur =

Indian writer (1963–2022)

- Born: Satheesh Babu; 13 August 1963; Pathirippala, Palghat, Kerala, India
- Died: 24 November 2022 (aged 59); Vanchiyoor, Trivandrum, Kerala, India
- Education: Payyanur College; Kanhangad Nehru College
- Occupations: Writer, journalist, television filmmaker, bank employee
- Spouse: Girija (m. 1990–2022)
- Children: 1
- Parent(s): Father Vasudevan Namboodiri and Mother Parvathi
- Writing career
- Language: Malayalam
- Years active: 1979–2022
- Genres: Short story, novel
- Notable works: Peramaram, Mannu, Vrishchikam Vannu Vilichu
- Notable awards: Kerala Sahitya Akademi Award

Satheesh Babu Payyannur (13 August 1963 – 24 November 2022) was a Malayalam–language short story writer and novelist from Kerala, India. His works include the novels Mannu, Daivappura, Manja Sooryante Naalukal and Kudamanikal Kilungiya Raavil, and the short story collections Peramaram, Vrishchikam Vannu Vilichu and Mazhayilundaya Makal. His oeuvre consists of 12 novels and around 200 short stories. The collection Peramaram won the Kerala Sahitya Akademi Award for Story in 2012. He received the Karoor Award, Malayattoor Award, and Thoppil Ravi Award. He was also a media personality and has written, directed and produced television programmes, telefilms, and documentaries.

== Early life and education ==
Satheesh Babu Payyannur was born on 13 August 1963, in Pathirippala, located in the Palghat district of Kerala. His mother Parvathi hailed from Pathirippala and his father Vasudevan Namboodiri from Payyannur, Kannur district, Kerala. He attended Payyannur Government School, where he began writing stories and features, winning several prizes at school youth festivals. He completed his pre-degree course (PDC) from Payyannur College and went on to earn a Bachelor of Commerce (BCom) degree from Kanhangad Nehru College. During this time, he became known as a writer, publishing stories, poetry, and essays in various periodicals. He also served as editor and publisher of Nehru College's campus newspaper, Campus Times, which was the first campus newspaper from any college in Calicut University.

== Career ==
After completing his education, Satheesh Babu Payyannur took up the role of editor at the Kasaragod-based weekly Ee Aazhcha. However, renowned editor S. Jayachandran Nair advised him not to pursue a full-time career in journalism if he wished to become a writer. Following this advice, Payyannur left his job at Ee Aazhcha and joined the State Bank of Travancore (SBT) in 1985. He worked at the Sreekandapuram and Thrikaripur branches of SBT before being transferred to the Trivandrum branch in 1991. He relocated to Trivandrum with the goal of working as an assistant to writer-director Padmarajan, whom he had befriended during the filming of Innale. However, Padmarajan had died around this time. Nonetheless, Payyannur continued to pursue his interest in cinema, writing the screenplay for the 1992 film Nakshthrakoodaram, which was directed by Padmarajan's assistant Joshy Mathew. Additionally, Payyannur wrote the dialogues for the 1993 live-action animated film O' Faby.

Since Payyannur could not find success in cinema, he transitioned to television where he found success as a director of telefilms, documentaries, and other programmes. He travelled to foreign countries for the series Gulfilunarunnu Keralam (Kerala Waking Up in the Gulf), which was the first Malayalam telefilm to be set and filmed entirely in the Gulf countries. Another notable series was European Sketchukal (European Sketches). In 2001, Payyannur resigned from the State Bank of Travancore to become fully immersed in literary activities and visual media. That same year, he established his own television production company, Panorama, which produced a variety of television programmes, such as Ponpulari on Surya TV. Panorama also published a magazine named Kerala Panorama from Trivandrum and has a YouTube channel by the same name.

During his tenure at the State Bank of Travancore, Payyannur was active in promoting literary events sponsored by the bank and in organising the annual SBT Literary Award. Payyannur was a member of the Kerala Sahitya Akademi and the Kerala State Chalachitra Academy. He also held the position of Member Secretary at Bharat Bhavan, a cultural exchange centre under the Kerala Cultural Affairs Department, for a period of five years.

== Death ==
Payyannur was found dead in his flat at Vanchiyoor near Trivandrum on 24 November 2022. A case was registered for unnatural death, but it was later declared that he died from a heart attack. His last rites were held at Paramekkavu Santhighat in Thrissur. He was survived by his wife Girija, a retired school teacher, and his daughter Varsha, who lives in Pune.

At the time of his death, Payyannur was working on an unfinished novel titled Sathram, which was based on the life of poet P. Kunhiraman Nair. He was also in talks with publishers about releasing a complete collection of his short stories to coincide with his 60th birthday. Additionally, he was planning a film adaptation of his short story "Lift", with actor Mammootty in the lead role.

== Literary career ==
=== Short stories ===
Satheesh Babu Payyannur "writes with compassion and force, his stories delving into the world of the most ordinary people to reveal extraordinary moments of human predicament. They are endowed with a gentle humaneness that probes the secret places of our humdrum existence in simple, direct words."

— Malayalam writer Paul Zachariah about Satheesh Babu Payyannur.

Payyannur began publishing his works in the late 1970s and early 1980s, and his writing soon garnered the attention and admiration of readers through the publication of numerous stories in various periodicals. In total, he published around 200 stories, including "Daivam", "Peramaram", "Vrishchikam Vannu Vilichu", "Manalparappu", "Manassu", "Ilayamma", "Scene Over" and "Lift". His story "Daivam" won the Karoor Award, sponsored by Sahithya Pravarthaka Co-operative Society, in 1984. The story was based on Theyyam, a ritual art form practised in Northern Kerala.

"Peramaram" ("The Guava Tree"), first published in the Mathrubhumi Illustrated Weekly in April 1989, tells the tale of Kunjuraman Nambiar, Meenakshi Amma, and their beloved guava tree, and the loneliness they face in their old age. "Peramaram" was published as a book only in 2001, in the collection Vrishchikam Vannu Vilichu (Vrischikam Came Calling), which is a collection of 31 stories written between 1988 and 2001. The story gained renewed interest in 2007 when V. K. Sreeraman wrote about it in his column Vazhvum Ninavum in Madhyamam Weekly. The story was later included in the 2011 collection Peramaram, with an introduction by Sreeraman. The collection had 20 stories and received the Kerala Sahitya Akademi Award for Story in 2012. The story "Peramaram" was also included in the 2018 collection Katha (Story).

"Manassu" was published in Kalakaumudi in May 1990 and was inspired by an experience related to Payyannur by the poet Balachandran Chullikkad. Likewise, the story "Vrishchikam Vannu Vilichu" was written in the same year and was based on Payyannur's own experiences during the Payyanur Subramanya temple festival, which takes place for fourteen days in the Malayalam month of Vrischikam. The story "Manalparappu" (1990) is about the intercaste marriage of Alice and Narayanan, and Payyannur wrote it shortly after his own marriage. A collection of his stories with rain as a common theme was published in the 1991 collection Mazhayilundaya Makal. "Ilayamma," another one of his stories, was published in 1993 in Kalakaumudi. Some of his later short stories are inspired by his experiences in cinema and visual media, such as "Scene Over", "Mazha Maranna Sumithra", "Thiruvananthapuram Cinema", "Thiranadakam" and "K. P. Mariamma". The stories "Cinema", "Nightmare" and "Story Board" also talk about the changes in the visual media in recent years.

Some of Payyannur's other short story collections include Khamaruneesayude Koottukari (Khamaruneesa's Friend), Newsreaderum Poochayum (The Newsreader and the Cat), Scene Over and Photo. Newsreaderum Poochayum is a collection of ten stories, including "Vayalattam", "Cinema", "Newsreaderum Poochayum", "Kudi Pallikoodam", "Lift" and "Fathima Suhra". The collection Mazhayilundaya Makalum Mattu Mazhakathakalum was published posthumously in January 2023. Some of his stories are translated into English and compiled in the title The Guava Tree.

=== Novels ===
Payyannur wrote his early novels such as Daivappura, Manja Sooryante Naalukal, Mannu, and Vilapavrikshathile Kaattu during the second half of the 1980s while living in Kannur and Kasargod districts. He was captivated by the ritualistic dance form of Kannur known as Theyyam, which formed the background for his 1984 novel Daivappura (Abode of God). Manja Sooryante Naalukal (The Days of the Yellow Sun) narrated the story of the employees of an evening newspaper. Mannu (Soil), set against the backdrop of the Kavumbai agitation of 1949, was written in 1985 when Payyannur worked at the Sreekandapuram branch of the State Bank of Travancore. Kavumbai was only a few kilometres away from Sreekandapuram and Payyannur initially intended to write a feature on the Kavumbai agitation but the story was so compelling that he finally decided to write a novel based on it. The novel was serialised over a period of 35 weeks in the Sunday supplement of Deshabhimani in 1988 and published as a book the following year by Trivandrum-based Chintha Publications, with a preface by E. M. S. Namboodiripad.

In the novel Vilapavrikshathile Kaattu, Payyannur discussed the lives of Christians who migrated from Travancore to the hills of northern Kerala. His other novels include Ulkhananangal and Kudamanikal Kilungiya Raavil (On the Night When the Bells Tolled), with Ulkhananangal, written during the opening of vaults of the Padmanabhaswamy temple, based on the history of Payyannur and Payyannur Pattu. The novels Oru Superhit Cinemayude Thirakkatha (The Script of a Superhit Film) and Kalikaal were inspired by Payyannur's experiences with visual media and cinema.

Ekantha Rathrikal (Lonely Nights) is a collection of five short novels—Ekantha Rathrikal, Noolkkolangal, Olikkuvan Oridam (A Place to Hide), Nadakam (Drama) and Ninavil Anitha Vararund (Anitha Comes in the Dreams). Moonnu Pranaya Novelettukal is a collection of three short romantic novels—Aval Neeraja (She, Neeraja), Ethetho Pulinangalil, and Sana, the latter based on a same-sex romantic relationship.

The last published work during his lifetime was Kamal Haasan Abhinayikkathe Poya Oru Cinema (A Film in Which Kamal Haasan Did Not Act) which is a collection of ten novellas including Kamal Haasan Abhinayikkathe Poya Oru Cinema, Oru Asambandha Online Padam (A Ridiculous Online Movie), Sana, Ulahannanum Njanum (Ulahannan and Me), Idanazhiyude Ingeyattathu (On this End of the Corridor), Nadakam (Drama), Thaniye (Alone), Ethetho Pulinangalil and Mazhayude Neenda Viralukal (The Long Fingers of the Rain). Chila Silkian Ninavukal (Some Silk Memories) is a collection of essays and memoirs including the memoirs about P. Kunhiraman Nair, Silk Smitha and Padmarajan.

== Awards ==
- 1985: Karoor Award by Sahithya Pravarthaka Co-operative Society for "Daivam"
- 2006: Abu Dhabi Sakthi Award for Story for Scene Over
- 2012: Kerala Sahitya Akademi Award for Story for Peramaram
- 2014: Abu Dhabi Sakthi Award for Novel for Ulkhananangal
- 2017: Malayattoor Award for Khamaruneesayude Koottukari
- 2018: Thoppil Ravi Award for Photo
- 2022: Ankanam Shamsudheen Smruthi Award for Short Story for Newsreaderum Poochayum
- Kerala Sahitya Vedi Award for Mannu
- SBT Literary Award for Scene Over
- TKD Memorial Award for Peramaram
- FOKANA International Award for Peramaram
- Atlas-Kairali Literary Award for Ulkhananangal

== Bibliography ==
Year	Title	Publisher	Notes	Ref.
1985	Daivappura	Kottayam: Current	Novel based on Theyyam	
1987	Kudamanikal Kilungiya Raavil	Kottayam: Vidyarthi Mithram	Novel	
1988	Manja Sooryante Naalukal	Kottayam: DC Books	Novel	
1988	Hridaya Daivatham	Calicut: Poorna	Collection of three novelettes	
1988	Oru Thoovalinte Sparsham	Kottayam: N.B.S.	Novel	
1989	Mannu	Trivandum: Chintha	Novel based on Kavumbai agitation	
1991	Mazhayilundaya Makal	Kollam: Imprint	Short story collection	
1996	Vilapavrikshathile Kaattu	Kottayam: DC Books	Novel based on Christian immigration to Malabar	
2000	Oru Superhit Cinemayude Thirakkatha	Kottayam: S.P.C.S.	Novel	
2001	Vrishchikam Vannu Vilichu	Thrissur: Current	Short story collection	
2005	Scene Over	Trivandrum: Kalam	Collection of 15 stories	
2005	Chila Silkian Ninavukal	Alleppey: Unma Publications	Essays and memoirs	
2008	Ekantha Rathrikal	Calicut: Mathrubhumi	Collection of novelettes	
2009	Moonnamathe Muri	Calicut: Poorna	Collection of stories	
2011	Peramaram	Calicut: Poorna	Short story collection	
2011	Kalikaal	Kannur: New Books	Novella	
2013	Ulkhananangal	Kottayam: DC Books	Novel	
2016	Khamaruneesayude Koottukari	Kottayam: DC Books	Short story collection	
2017	Photo	Trivandrum: Kalam	Collection of nine stories	
2018	Katha	Kottayam: S.P.C.S.	Short story collection	
2018	Moonnu Pranaya Novelettukal	Calicut: Olive	Collection of three novelettes	
2020	Newsreaderum Poochayum	Kottayam: DC Books	Short story collection	
2021	Ente Gramakathakal	Calicut: Olive	Short story collection	
2022	Kamal Haasan Abhinayikkathe Poya Oru Cinema	Trivandum: Chintha	Collection of ten novelettes	
2023	Mazhayilundaya Makalum Mattu Mazhakathakalum	Thrissur: H&C Books	Short story collection	
