= Korayar River =

River in Kerala, India

Korayar River is one of the tributaries of the river Kalpathipuzha, which in turn is a main tributary of the Bharathapuzha River, the second-longest river in Kerala, south India. It originates from Anamalai, Tamilnadu and merges with the Walayar which later converges with the Bharathapuzha at Pattambi.

== See also ==
- Bharathapuzha - Main river
  - Kalpathipuzha - One of the main tributaries of the river Bharathapuzha

=== Other tributaries ===
- Korayar
- Varattar
- Walayar
- Malampuzha
