= Varattar River =

River in Kerala, India

Varattar River is one of the tributaries of the river Kalpathipuzha. The Kalpathipuzha is one of the main tributaries of the Bharathapuzha River, the second-longest river in Kerala, south India.

In June 2017, a rejuvenation process was conducted at Aadi Pamba to bring back Varattar river to life. However, the Hindu reported that the Aadi Pampa-Varattar river rejuvenation project taken up at a cost of Rs.43.93 crore could only clean up weed in about 2 km after a year of its launch in October 2023.

== See also ==
- Bharathapuzha River - Main river
  - Kalpathipuzha - One of the main tributaries of the Bharathapuzha River

=== Other tributaries of the river Kalpathipuzha ===
- Korayar
- Varattar
- Walayar
- Malampuzha
