= Walayar Dam =

Infrastructure of Kerala, India

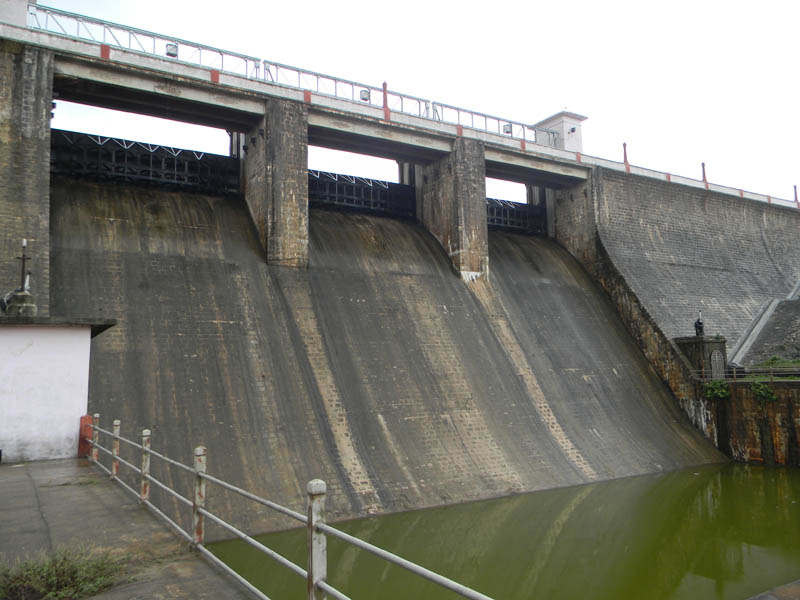

- Location within Kerala Location within India
- Location: Palakkad, Kerala, India
- Coordinates: 10°50′40″N 76°51′7″E
- Construction began: 1953
- Opening date: 1964
- Operator: Government of Kerala

Dam and spillways
- Impounds: Walayar River
- Height: 20.42 m (67.0 ft)
- Length: 1,478.00 m (4,849.08 ft)

Reservoir
- Total capacity: 18.4 Million cubic meter
- Catchment area: 106.35 km^{2} (41.06 sq mi)

Walayar Dam is a dam in Palakkad district of Kerala, India. This dam is constructed across the Walayar River, which is a tributary of Kalpathipuzha River. It was completed and opened in 1964. It is one of the major sources of irrigation in the region. Most of the water in this river is passed to the inner places of Walayar. The dam holds a larger reservoir area, and the persons living near the reservoir area utilizes the water from the walayar dam as their main water source for irrigation. Currently the water held inside the reservoir is less due to lesser rain at Walayar. The reservoir area is very scenic and has better scope for tourism.

== In popular culture ==
The climax scenes of Malayalam movie Odiyan was shot around an Indian banyan tree nearby the place.

== See also ==
- List of dams and reservoirs in India
