= Kalpathy River =

Coordinates: 10.795493°N 76.64386°E

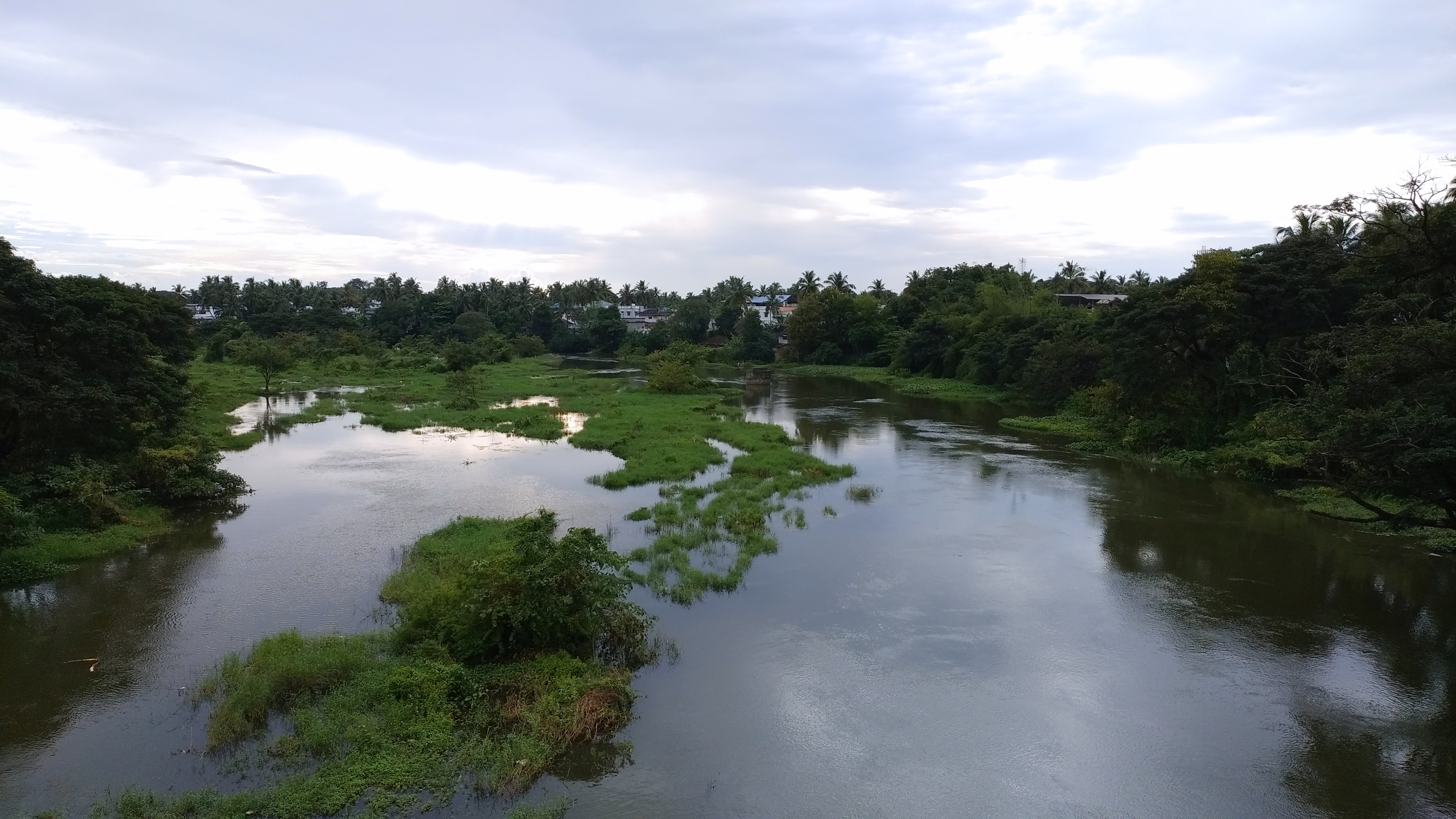

The Kalpathy River, also known as the Kalpathipuzha, is one of the main tributaries of the Bharathapuzha River, the second-longest river in Kerala, south India.

The Kalpathipuzha originates in the upper slopes of the Western Ghats deep inside Palakkad district from the place called Chenthamarakulam in the hills, north of Walayar. It is formed from the confluence of four tributaries, namely the Malampuzha River, Walayar River, Korayar River, and Varattar River. The Malampuzha Dam is built across this river just before Palakkad city. The river is named after the Kalpathy Siva temple in the city which is famous for its festival.

One of the problems faced by the Kalpathipuzha, like most other rivers in Kerala, is illegal sand mining. This has left many pits in the riverbed, which leads to shrub growth. During summer the river is covered by a green carpet of Water Hyacinth and other shrubs.

== Other tributaries of the Kalpathy ==
- Korayar
- Varattar
- Walayar
- Malampuzha
