= Walayar River =

Coordinates: 10°47′N 76°44′E

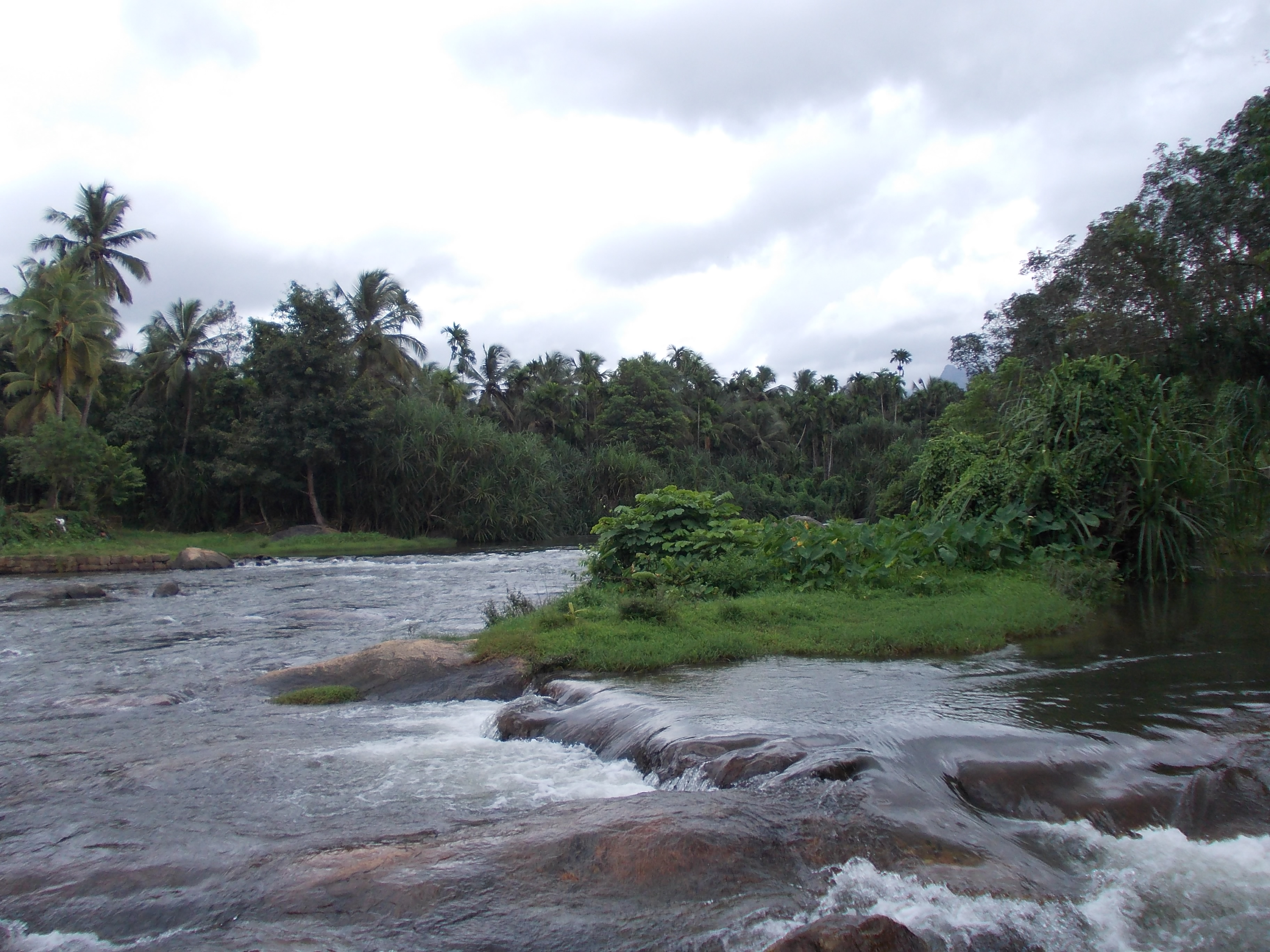
- Walayar River in 2010

Location
- Country: India

Walayar River (also called Velliyar River or Valliyar River) is one of the tributaries of the river Kalpathipuzha.It originates in the Sirumalai hills. The Kalpathipuzha is one of the main tributaries of the Bharathapuzha River, the second-longest river in Kerala, India.

The Walayar Dam is constructed across this river. It was completed and opened in 1964. Previously, Walayar Dam was as famous as Malampuzha Dam. The Walayar dam has an associated irrigation project.

The river is by a valley and a garden equipped with a children's play area.

== History ==
In August 2023, two students were drowned after being washed away by strong currents in the river.
