= Malampuzha River =

River in Kerala, India

Malampuzha River is one of the tributaries of the river Kalpathipuzha. Malampuzha Dam is built across the river at Malampuzha about 8 km from the Palakkad city in the Indian state of Kerala. The reservoir formed by the Malampuzha Dam is 23.13 square kilometres in area and is the second largest reservoir in Kerala after the Idukki reservoir. The construction of Malampuzha dam started in the year 1949 and was completed in the year 1955. The project is estimated to have cost around Rs. 53 million. Malampuzha river joins the Kalpathipuzha, a tributary of the Bharathapuzha at Palakkad. Kalpathipuzha then flows westward to join Kannadipuzha at Parali to form Bharathapuzha, which ultimately flows until Ponnani, passing through towns and villages Mankara, Pathirippala, Lakkidi, Thiruvilwamala, Ottapalam, Mayannur, Shoranur, Cheruthuruthy, Thirumittakode, Pattambi, Thrithala, Kudallur, Kuttippuram, Thirunavaya and Chamravattom.

== See also ==
- Malampuzha Dam
