= Vanchiyoor =

Vanchiyoor is a locality in downtown Thiruvananthapuram city, the capital of the India state of Kerala. Vanchiyoor occupies an important place in the history of Travancore. It was the district headquarters and most important offices were situated here. There are a lot of heritage monuments in the area. Major administrative, commercial, government and judicial establishments are still located in Vanchiyoor. It is part of Vanchiyoor Village, which holds the prominent administrative headquarters and landmarks of Kerala. Proximity with major educational institutions, offices and shopping centres coupled with easy road connectivity with all parts of the city make it a favoured residential locale in Thiruvananthapuram. Vanchiyoor is 2 kilometres (1.2 mi) from Statue Junction, about 3 kilometres (1.9 mi) from Palayam and 2 kilometres (1.2 mi) from the central railway and bus stations. Trivandrum International Airport lies 6 kilometres (3.7 mi) to the southwest of Vanchiyoor.

== Prominent government buildings in Vanchiyoor Village ==
1. Government Secretariate
2. District Civil and Criminal Courts
3. District Treasury
4. Central Railway Station
5. Central Bus Station
6. Central Telegraph Office
7. City Rationing Office
8. Employment Exchange
9. General Post Office
10. Accountant General (A&E) Kerala
11. Old Collecterate
12. Old High Court
13. Passport Office

== Educational institutions ==
=== Universities ===
1. Sree Sankara University of Sanskrit, Trivandrum Campus

=== Colleges ===
1. Govt. Ayurveda College, Trivandrum

=== Schools ===
1. Fort High School
2. SMV Govt. Model High School
3. Holy Angels Convent Girls Higher Secondary School
4. Chinmaya Vidyalaya, Kunnumpuram
5. Govt High School, Vanchiyoor
6. Govt. UPS, Chettikulangara
7. St.JOSEPH HIGHER SECONDARY SCHOOL

== Religious institutions ==
=== Hindu temples and ashrams ===
1. Sree Padmanabha Swamy Temple
2. Sreekanteswaram Temple
3. Pazhavangadi Ganapathi Temple
4. Rishimangalam Sree Krishna Swami Temple. Chaturbahu Vishnu form (Formal similarity) * Guruvayur idol: The idol in Guruvayur is actually of Chaturbahu Mahavishnu in its full form. This is the form in which he holds a conch, a wheel, a mace and a lotus in his four hands. This is the form of Vishnu, the Jagadguru, shown by Krishna to Devaki-Vasudeva at the time of his birth. * Rishimangalam Deity: The main deity in Rishimangalam is also in the form of Vishnu with four arms. But here, worship is in the form of Lord Krishna (especially in the form of Parthasarathy or Rajagopala). Both the temples have a similar feeling that even though it is a Vishnu idol, the devotees worship it as Krishna. Devi Temple
5. Pazhaya Sreekanteswaram Temple
6. Kovilvila Bhagavati Temple
7. Abhedananda Ashram

=== Churches ===
1. St. Thomas Marthoma Church, Pattoor
2. Knanaya Syrian Church, Pattoor
3. St. George Orthodox Cathedral, Spencer Junction, M G Road

=== Mosques ===
1. Juma Masjid, Thampanoor

=== Other institutions ===
1. YMCA Trivandrum (since 1873)
