= Pathirippala =

Pathirippala (or Pathiripala) is a town in Palakkad district, Kerala, India, between Ottappalam and Palakkad on the Palakkad–Ponnani state highway SH 23.

== Administration ==
Lekkidi-Perur, Mankara and Mannur Gram Panchayats constitute the town. It is famous for its recently revived weekly vegetable market. Pathiripala is a place that connects to Kongad. Pathiripala Higher Secondary School is situated near the junction itself. Pookkattukunnu, Nagripuram, Perur and Athirkkadu are nearby villages.
