= Malampuzha Dam =

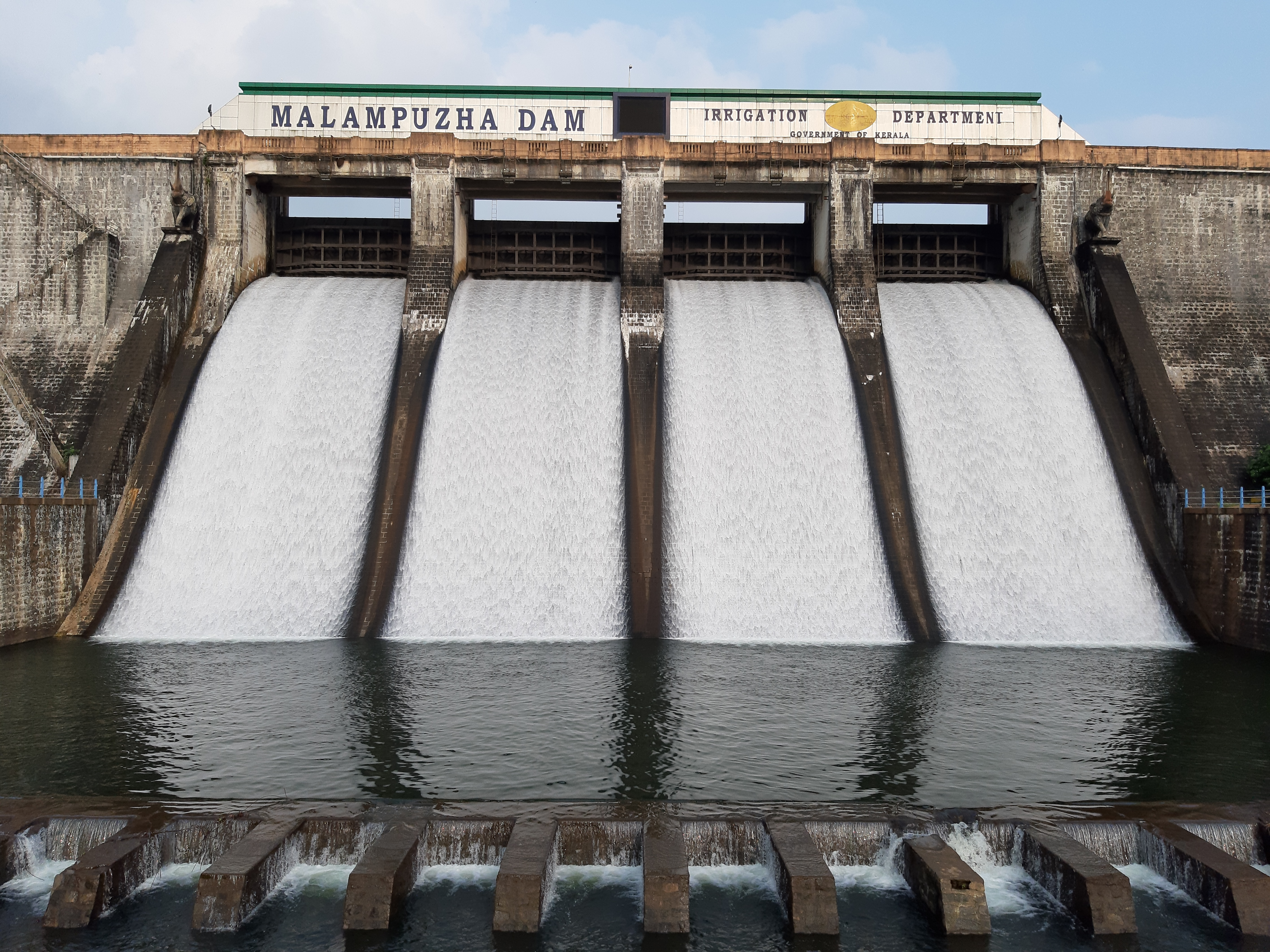

- Location within India Location within Kerala

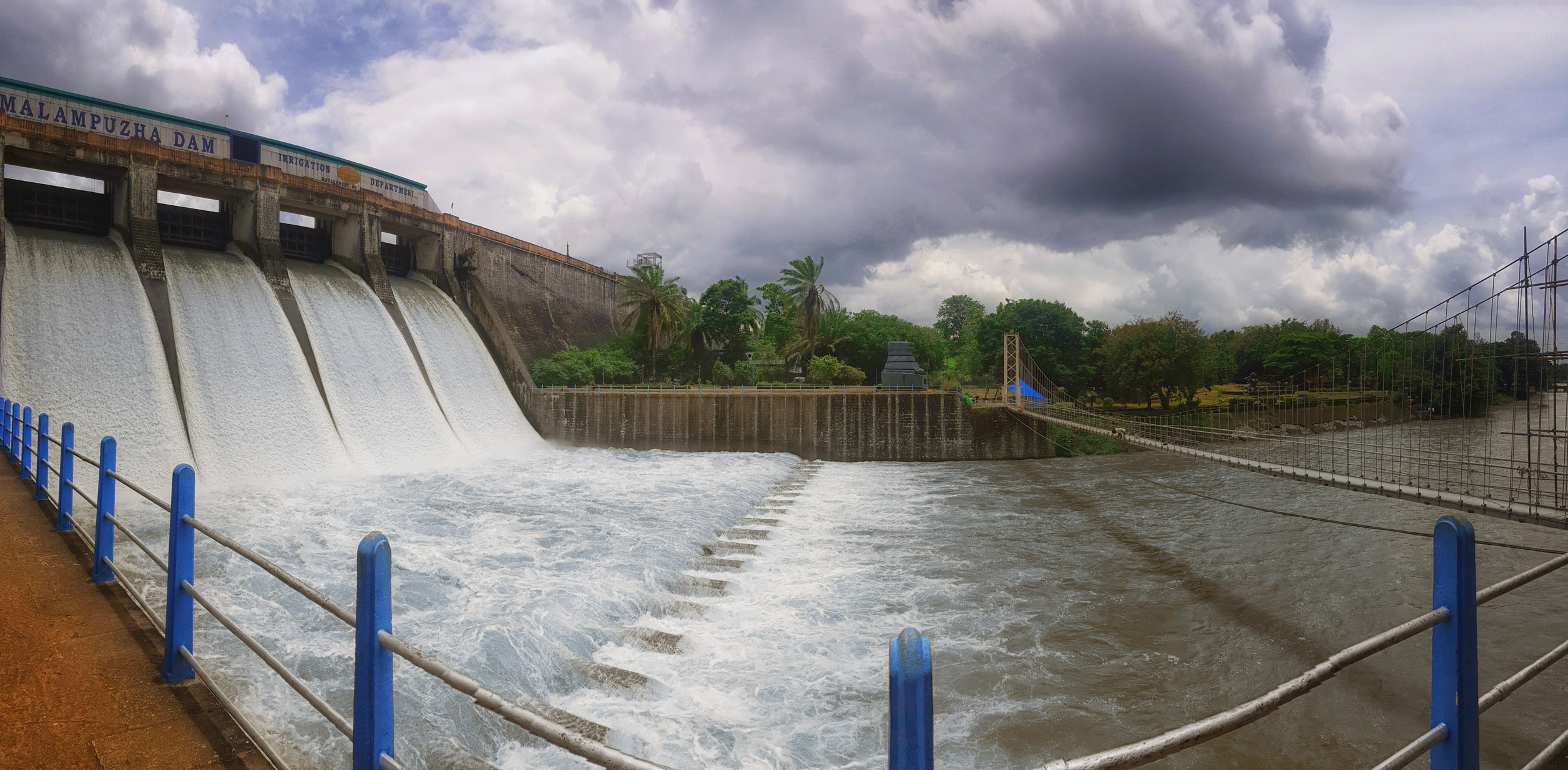
- Official name: Malampuzha Dam panoramic shot
- Location: Palakkad District, Kerala
- Coordinates: 10°49′49.8″N 76°41′1.5″E
- Construction began: March 1949
- Opening date: 9 October 1955

Dam and spillways
- Impounds: Malampuzha river
- Height: 115.06 m (377.5 ft)
- Length: 2,069 m (6,788 ft)

Reservoir
- Creates: Malampuzha Reservoir
- Total capacity: 226 million cubic metres (8 tmc ft)
- Catchment area: 147.63 sq. km.

Malampuzha Dam is the largest dam and reservoir in Kerala, located near Palakkad, in the state of Kerala in South India, built post-independence by the then Madras state. Situated in the scenic hills of the Western Ghats in the background, it is a combination of a masonry dam with a length of 1,849 metres and an earthen dam with a length of 220 metres making it the longest dam in the state. The dam is 355 feet high and impounds the Malampuzha River, a tributary of Bharathappuzha, Kerala's second-longest river. There is a network of two canal systems that serve the dam's reservoir of 42,090 hectares.

== Construction ==
The dam project was begun in 1949 and completed in 1955. foundation stone for the project was laid on 27 March 1949, by the then Public Works Minister of Madras State, Sri M. Bhaktavatsalam as Palakkad was a part of the Madras Presidency during those times. The dam was constructed in record time, and on 9 October 1955, the then Chief Minister of Madras State, Thiru. K Kamaraj, inaugurated the dam. The total catchment area is 147.63 square kilometres, and the reservoir has a capacity of 226 million cubic meters of water. The canal systems serve to irrigate farmland while the reservoir provides drinking water to Palakkad and surrounding villages. The dam was constructed by the Madras government but upon the Creation of linguistically reorganized states, the Malabar District encompassing the Dam became a part of the Kerala State.

== Location ==
15 km from Palakkad city, North Kerala. Attractions: Dam, amusement park, boating facilities, rock garden and ropeway.

Around the reservoir of the dam are gardens and amusement parks. Boating facilities are available on the lake.

== Getting there ==
Nearest railway station: Palakkad Junction - 14 km

Nearest airport: Coimbatore, 55 km from Malampuzha Dam

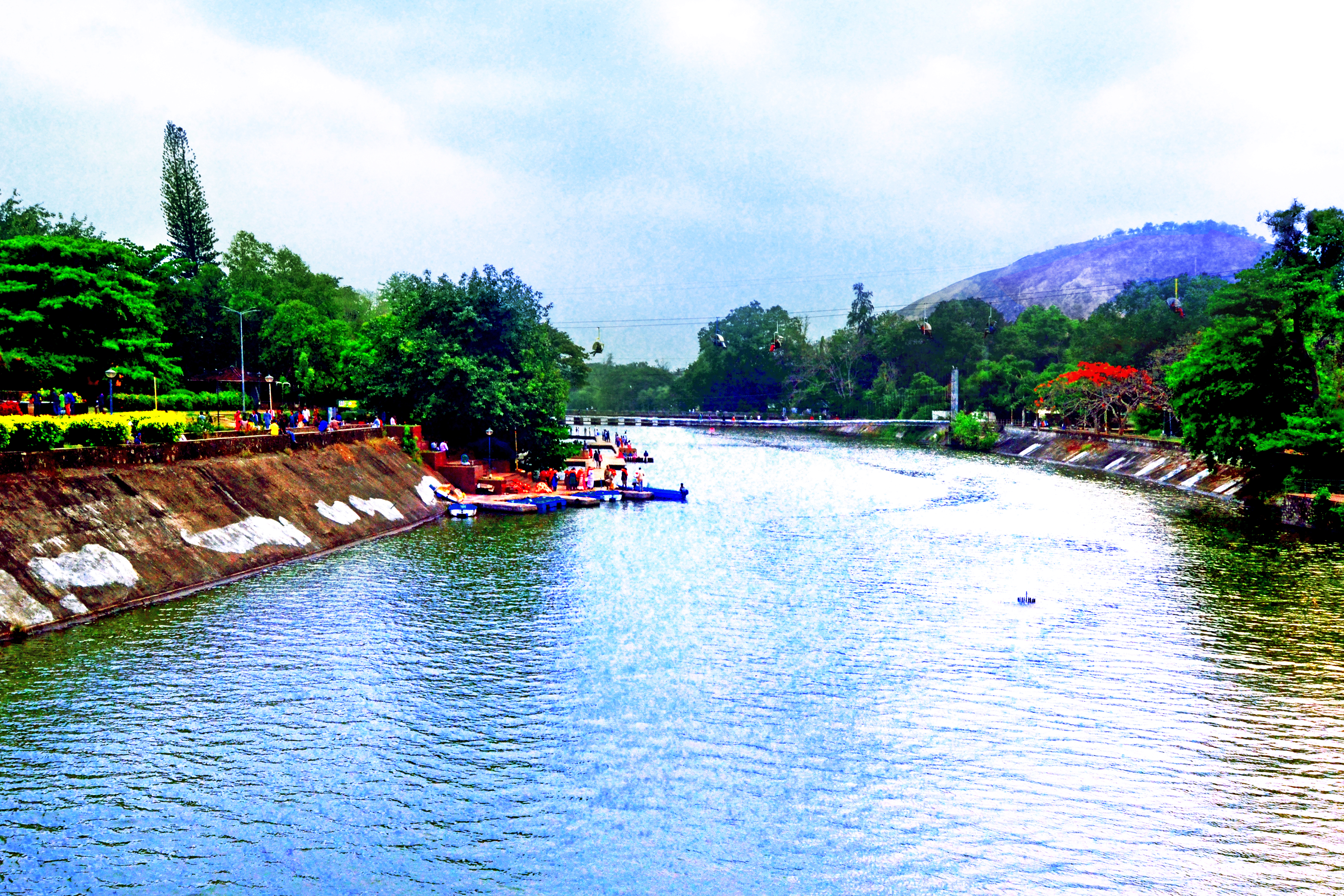
MALAMPUZHA DAM OUTLET WATER CANAL

== Main Attractions ==
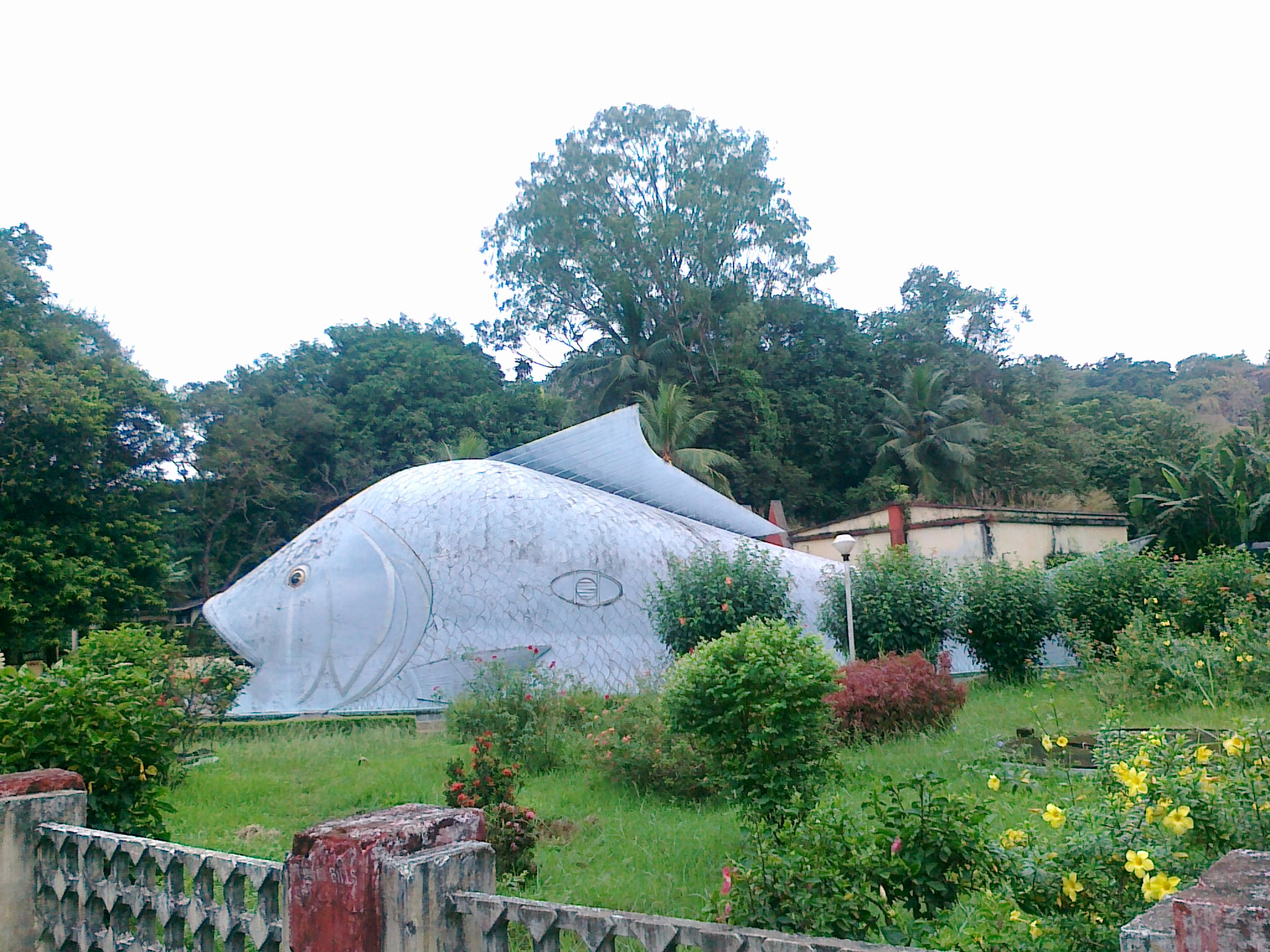
The fish shaped aquarium

- Entrance Garden
- Yakshi Garden
- Yakshi Statue
- Japanese Garden
- Upper Garden and viewpoint
- Cable car ride
- Fish shaped aquarium
- Toy train for kids
- Fantasy Park
- Spiced fruits camp
- Trekking tracks
- River baths

== Picture gallery ==
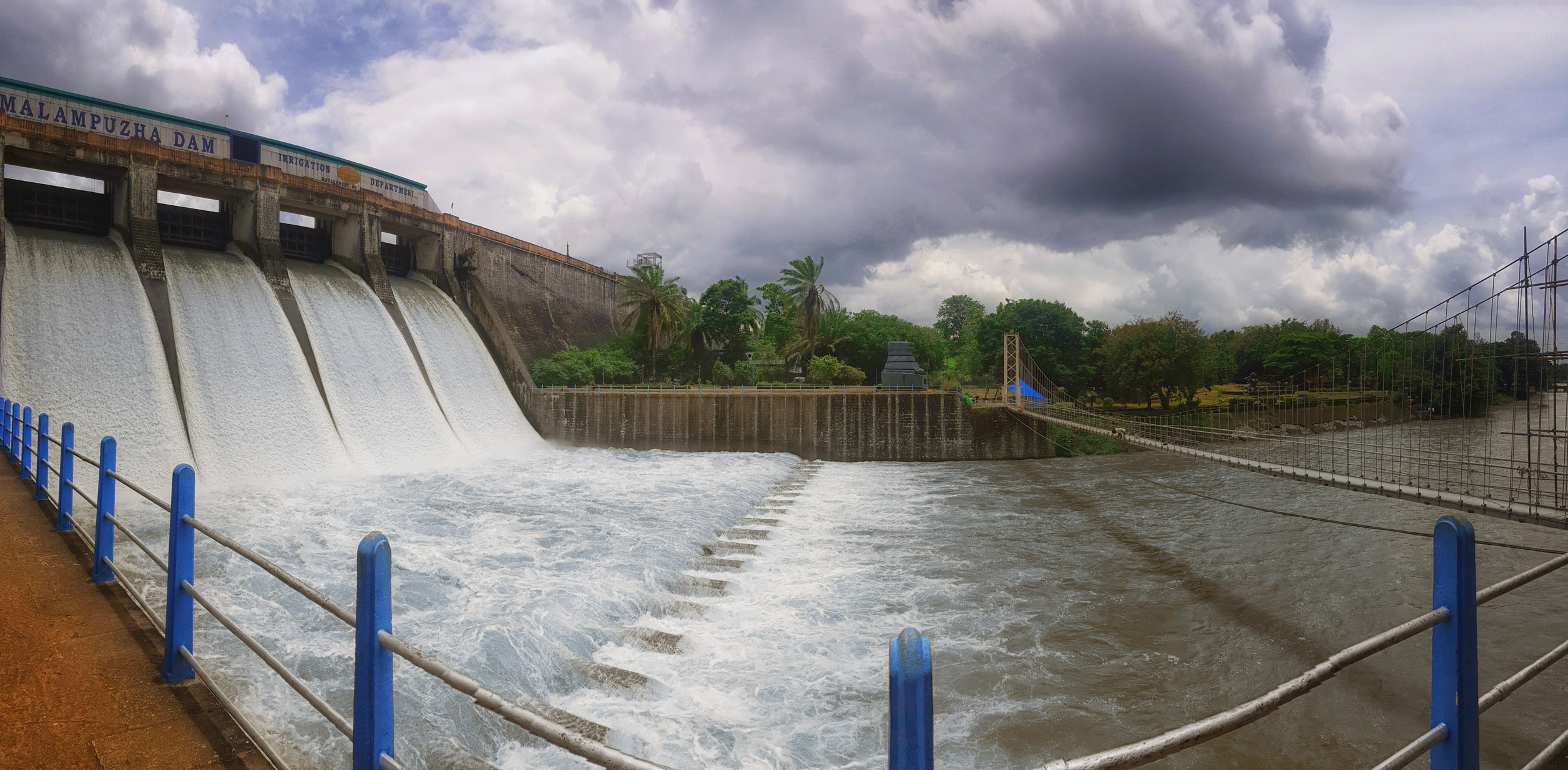

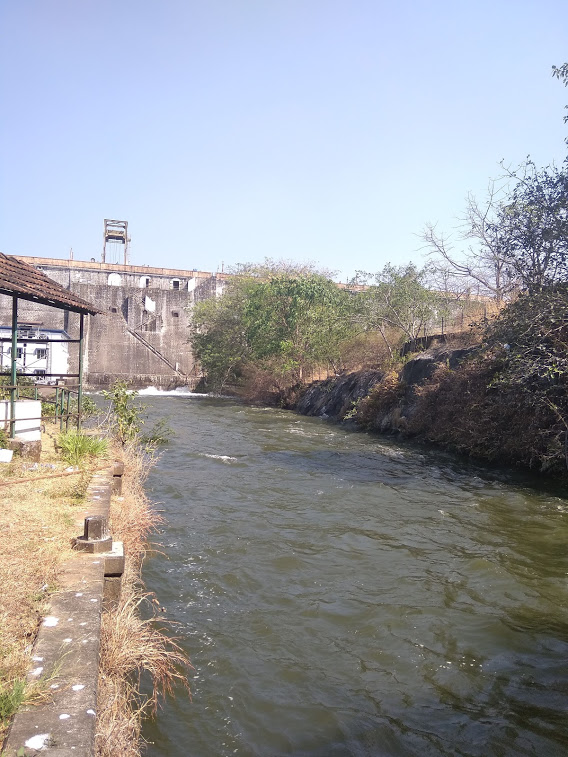

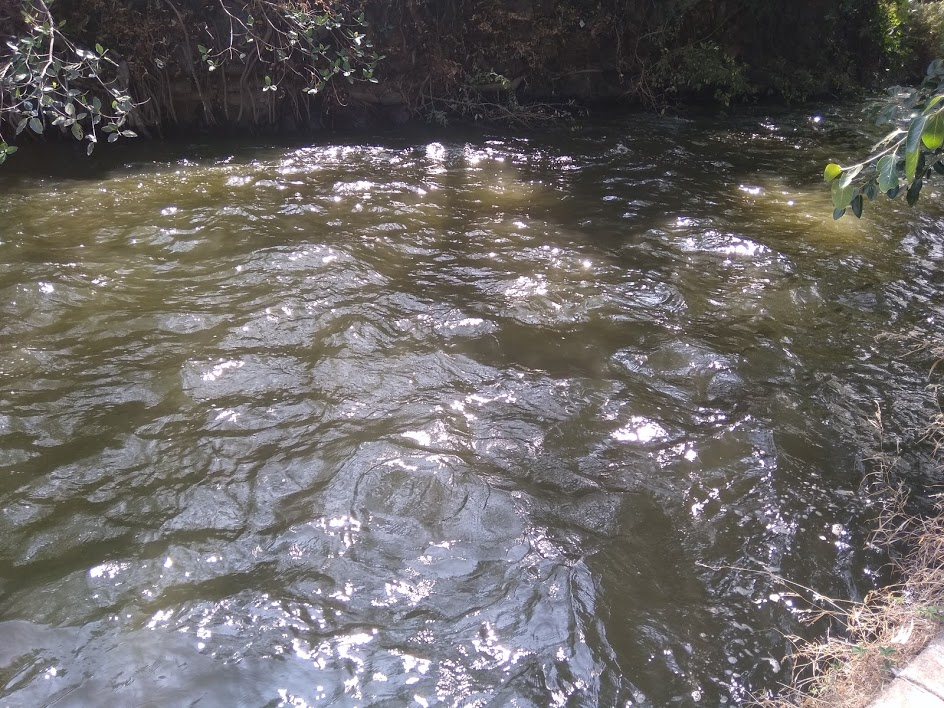

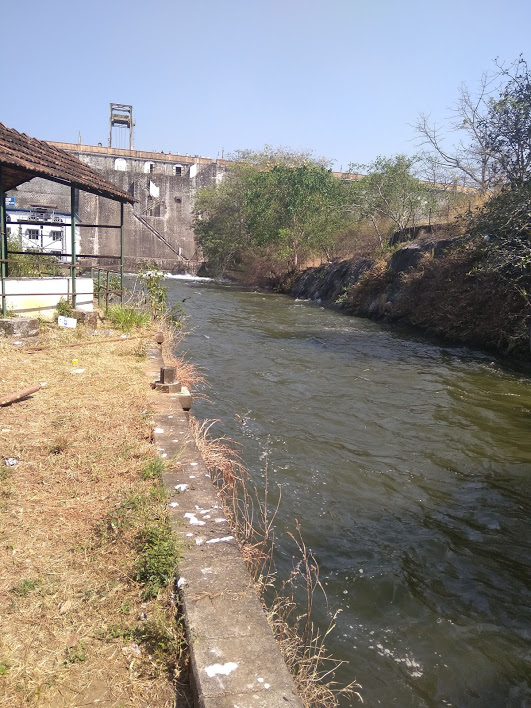

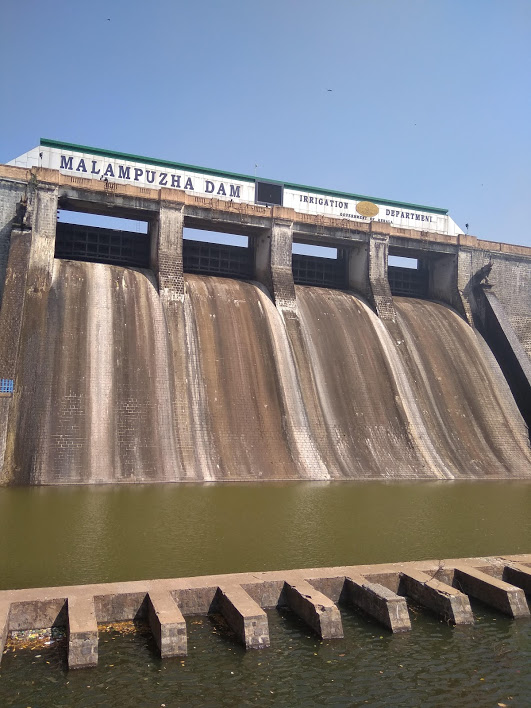

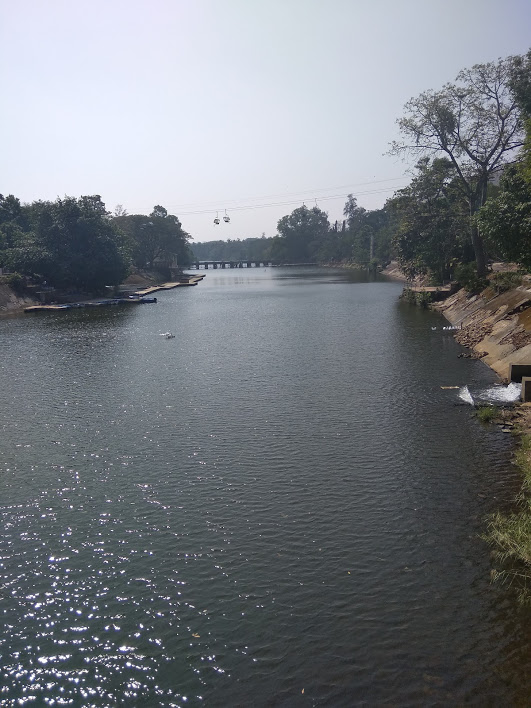

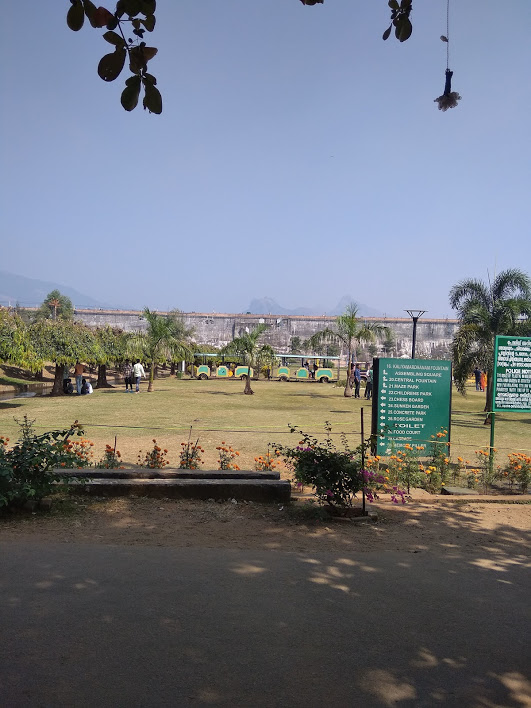

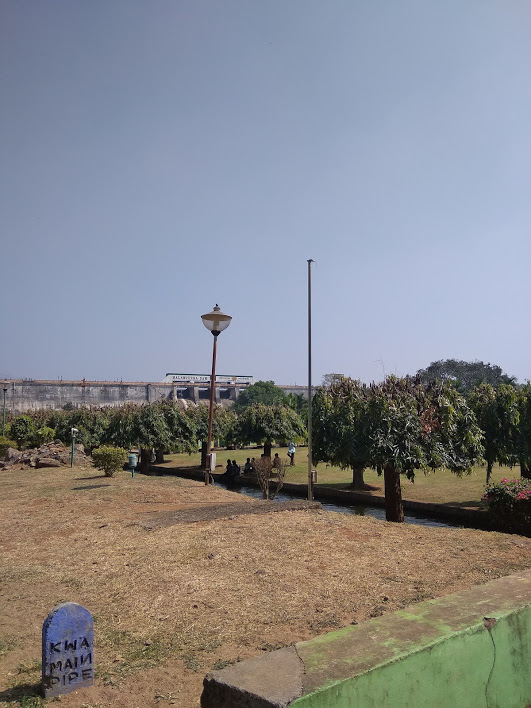

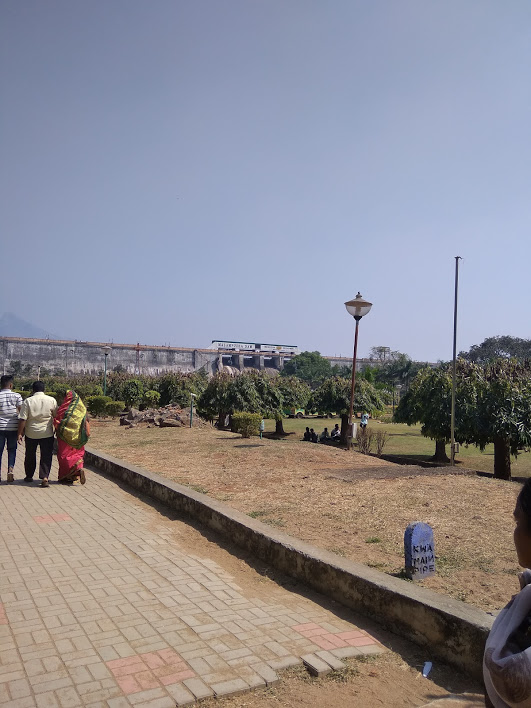

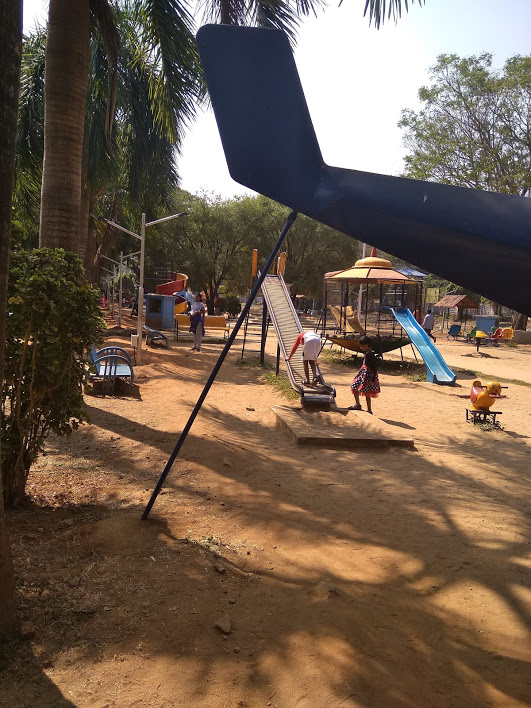

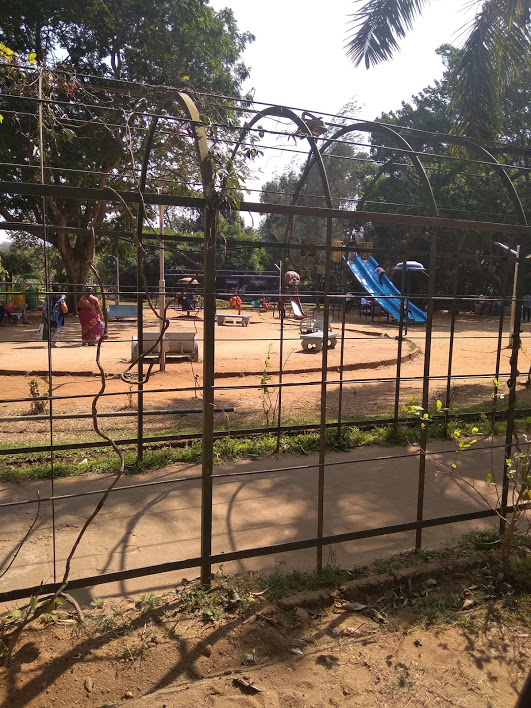

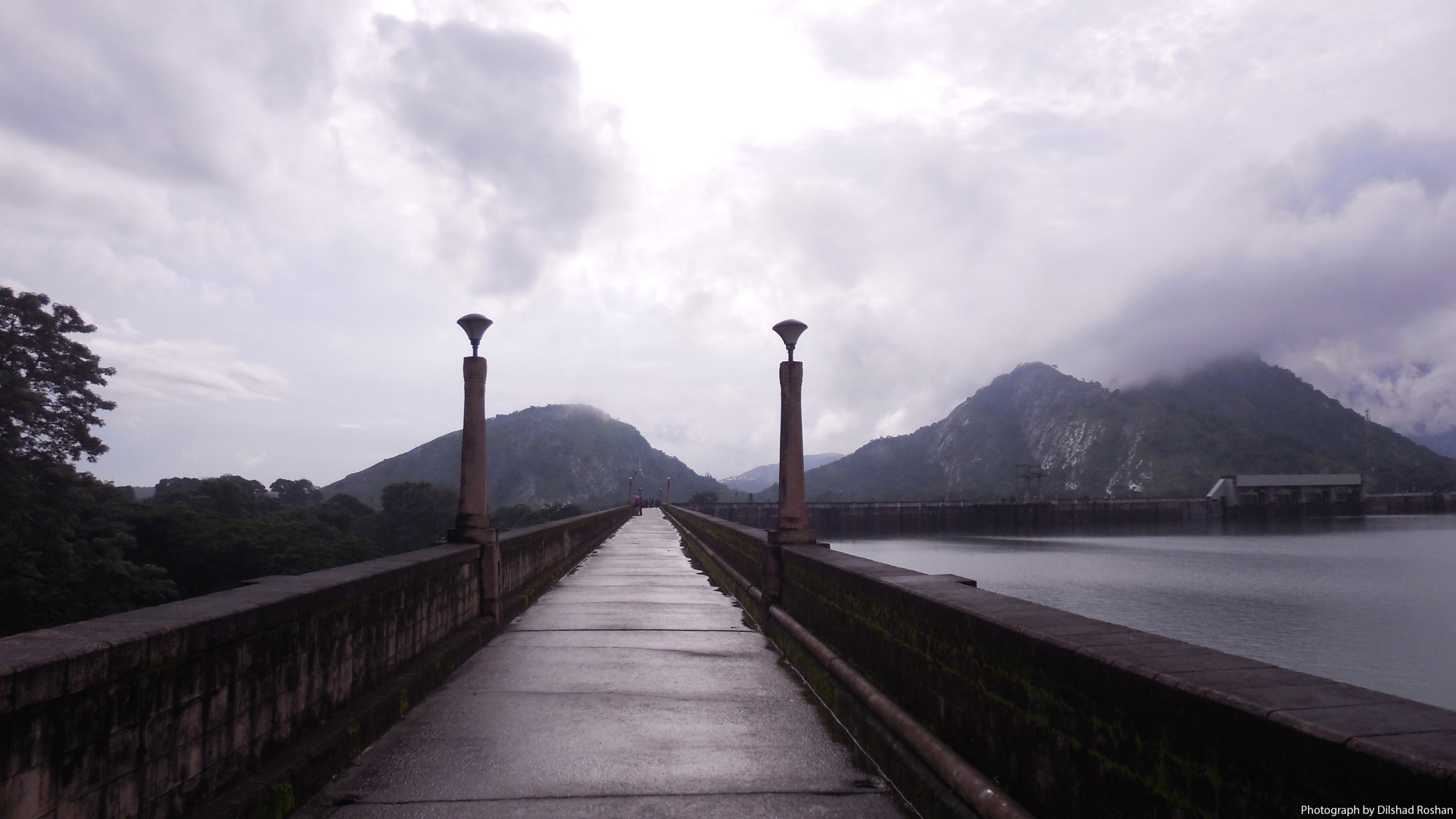
Malampuzha Dam Reservoir 1

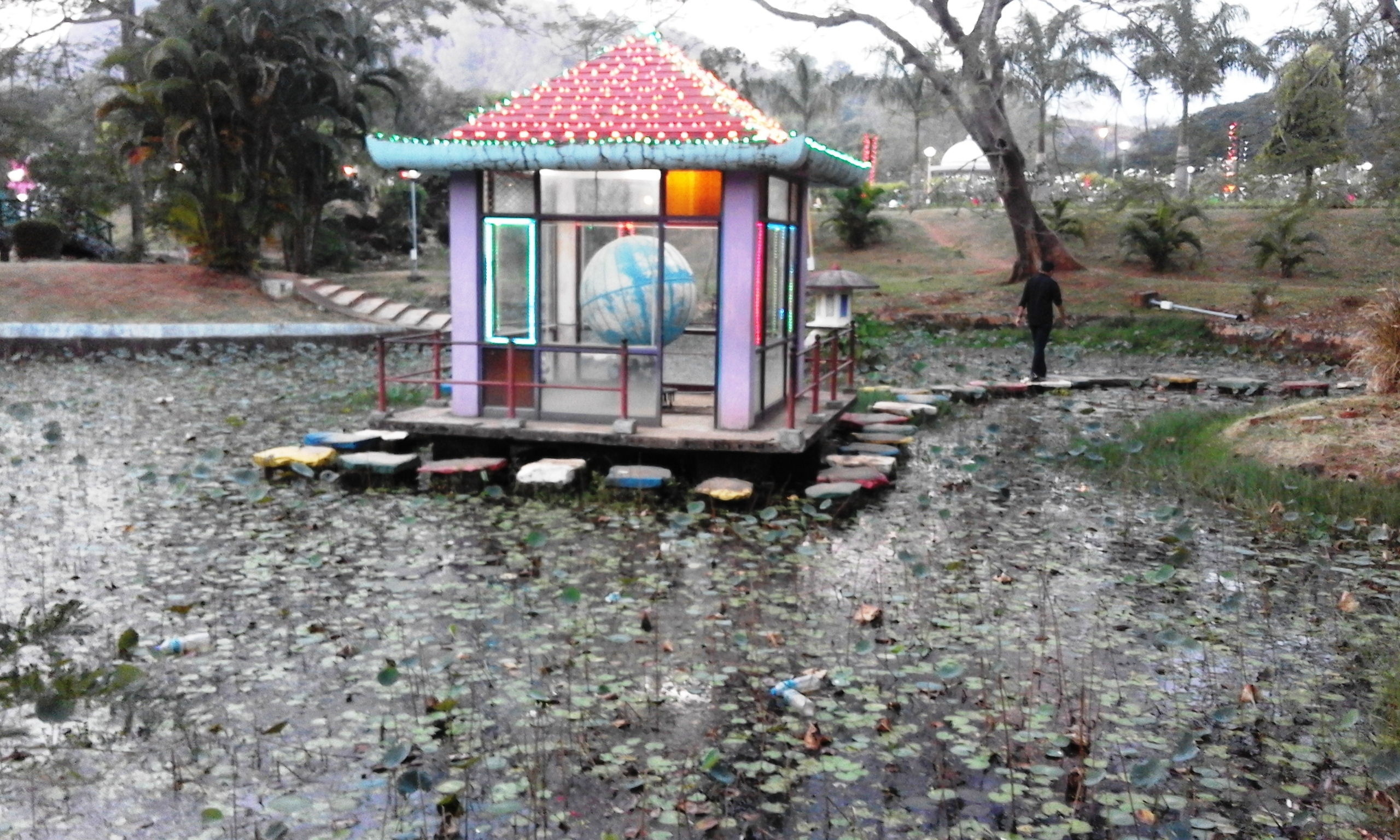
Japanese Garden

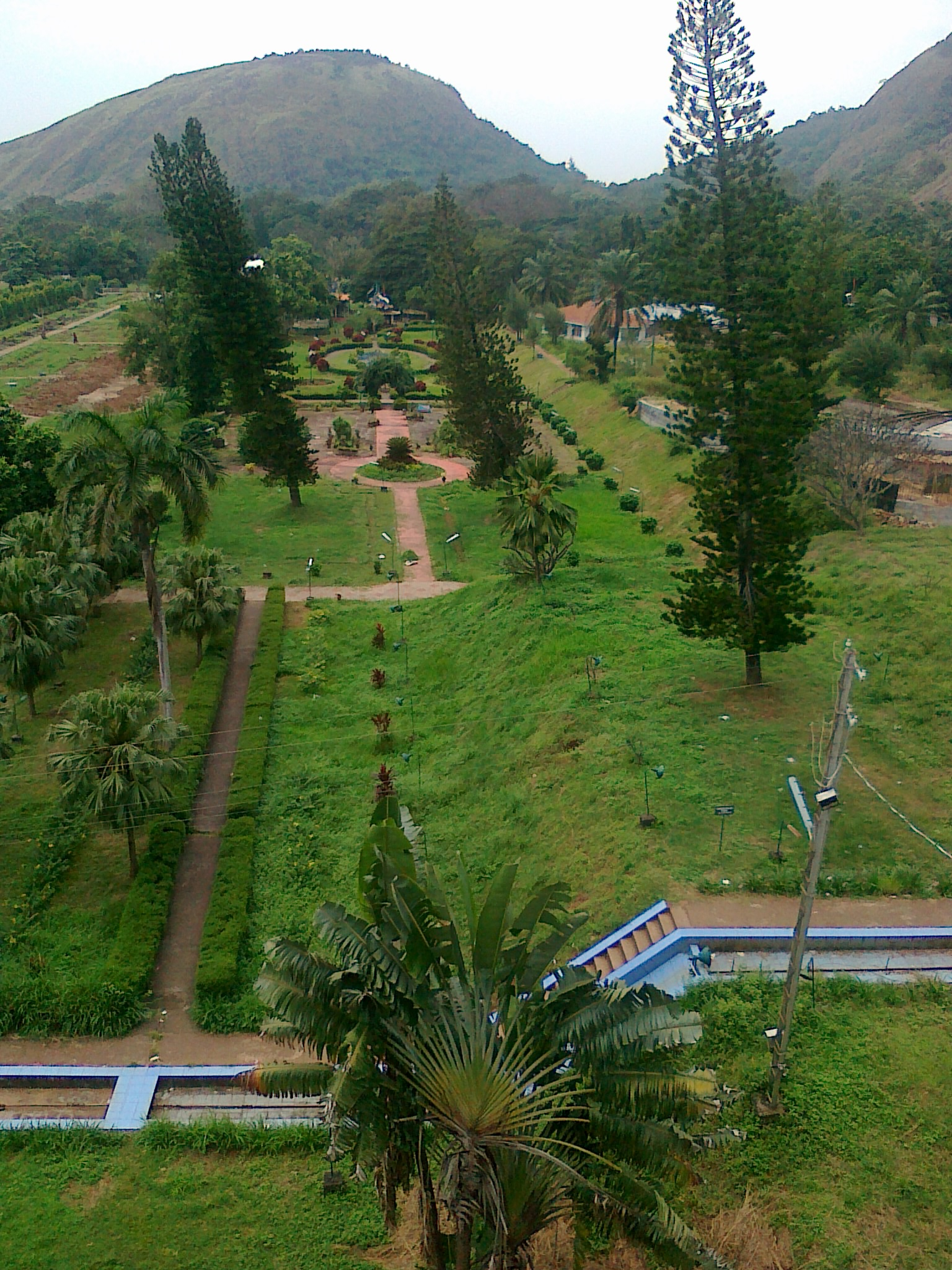
Garden with a mountain background

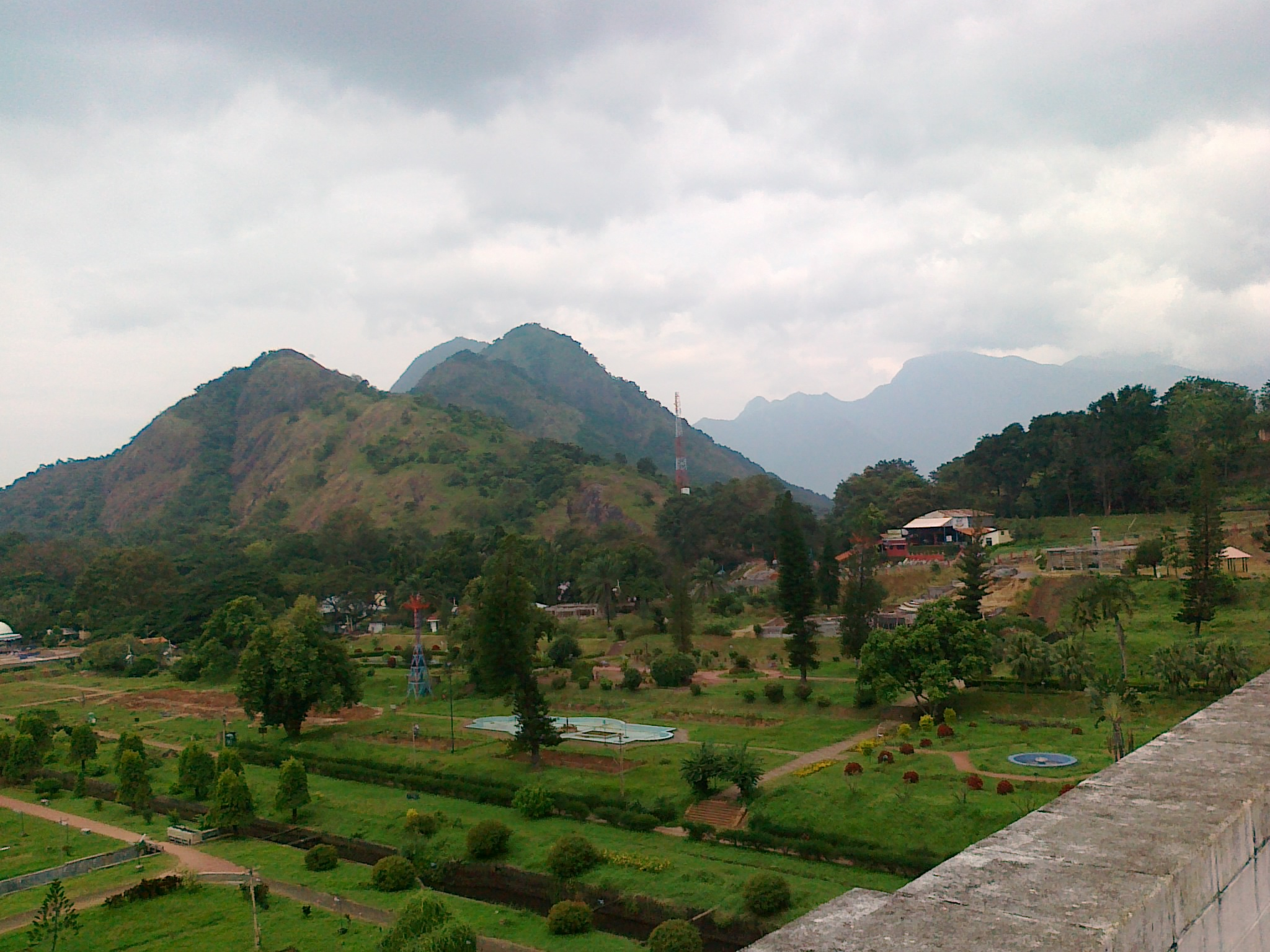
Wide view

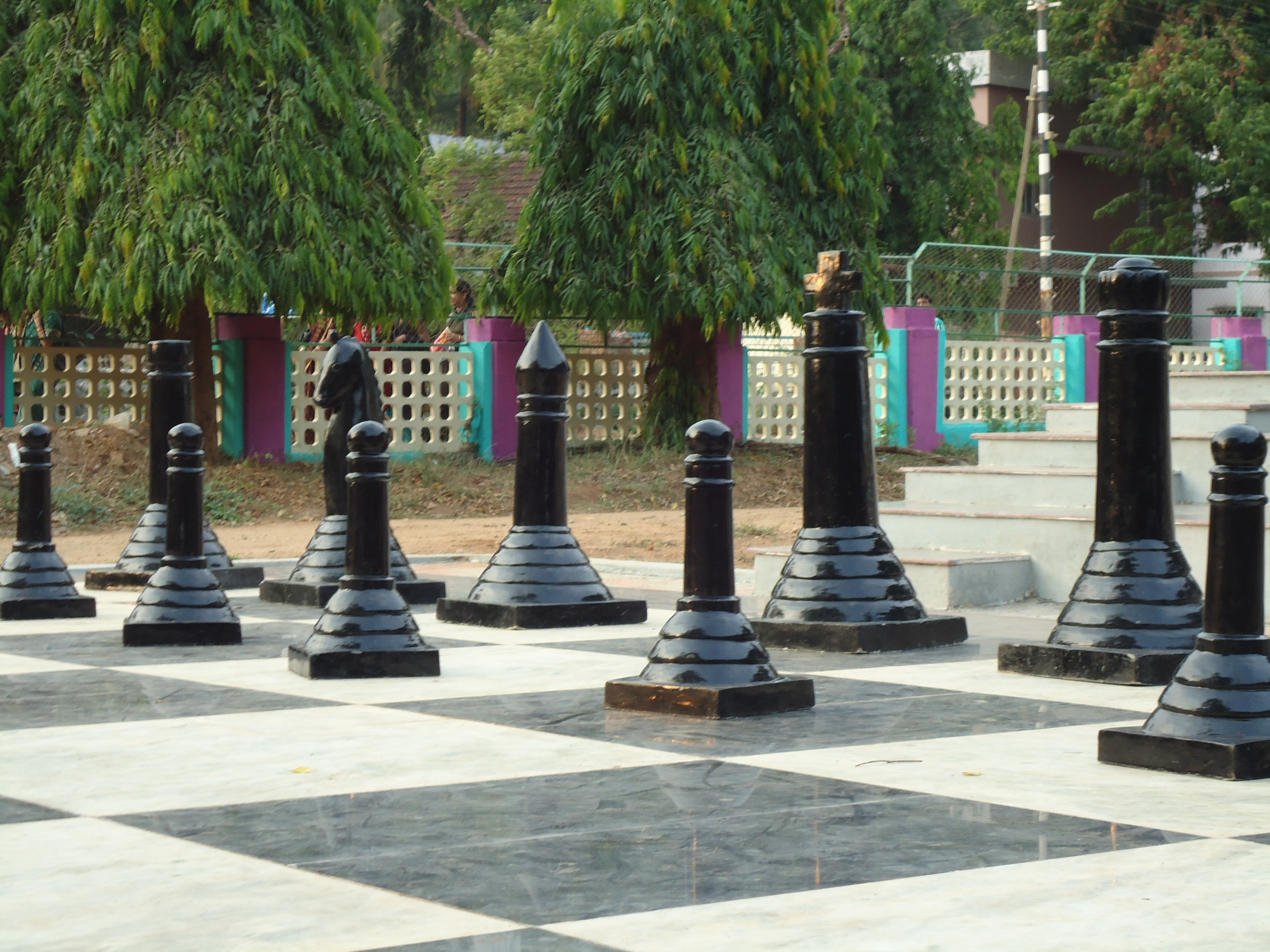
Chess Board Park

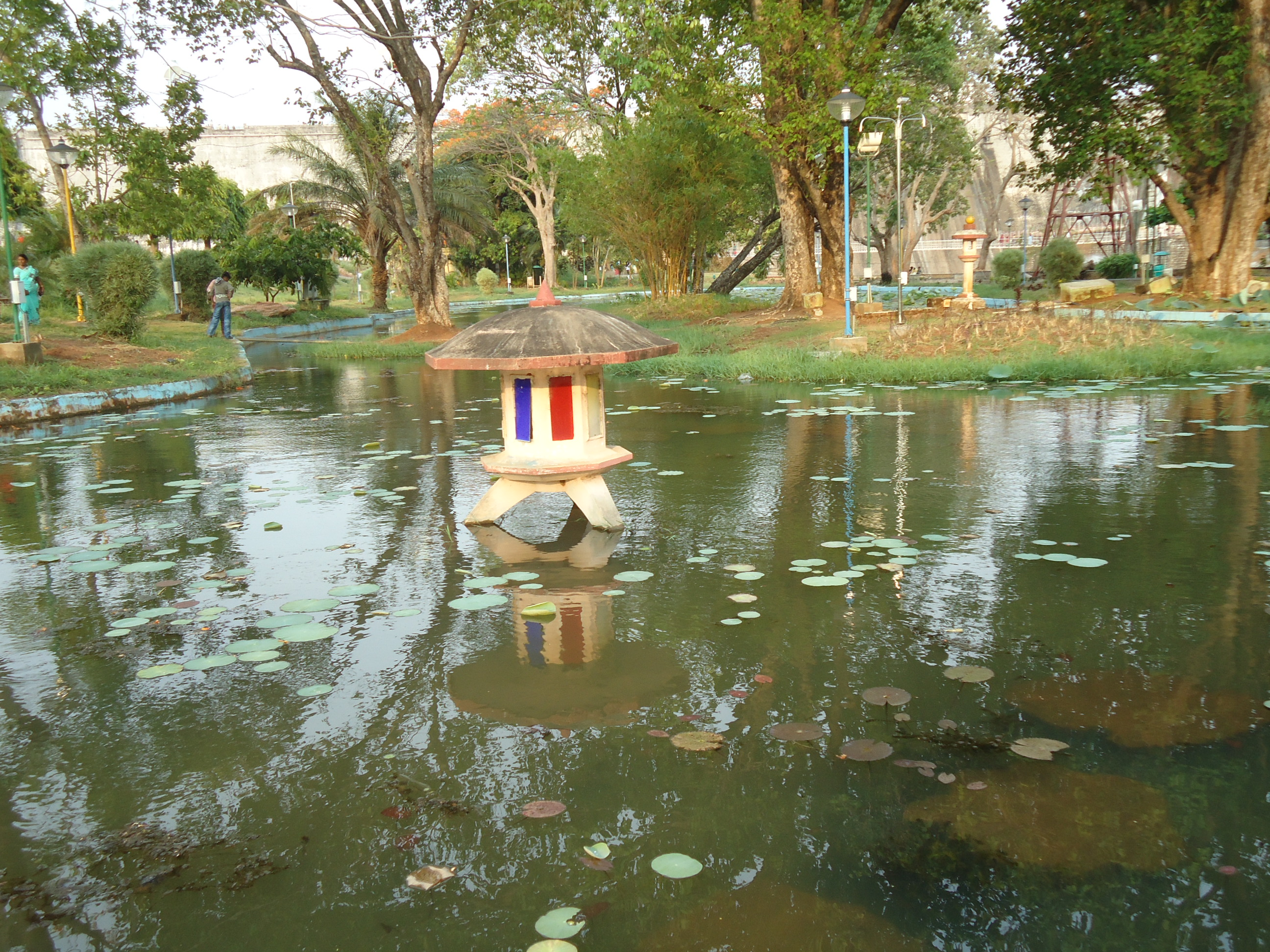
Japanese Garden

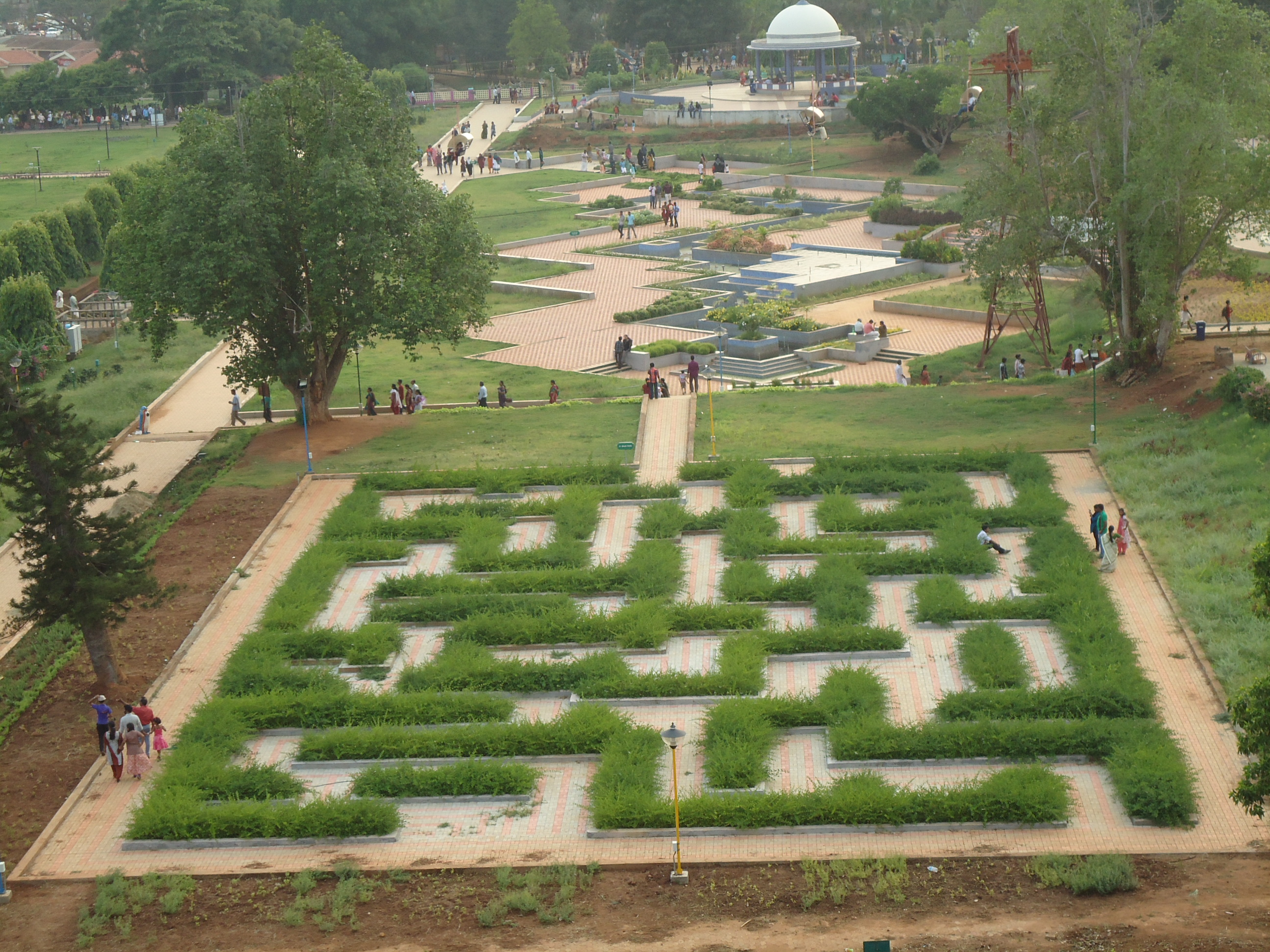
Maze Park

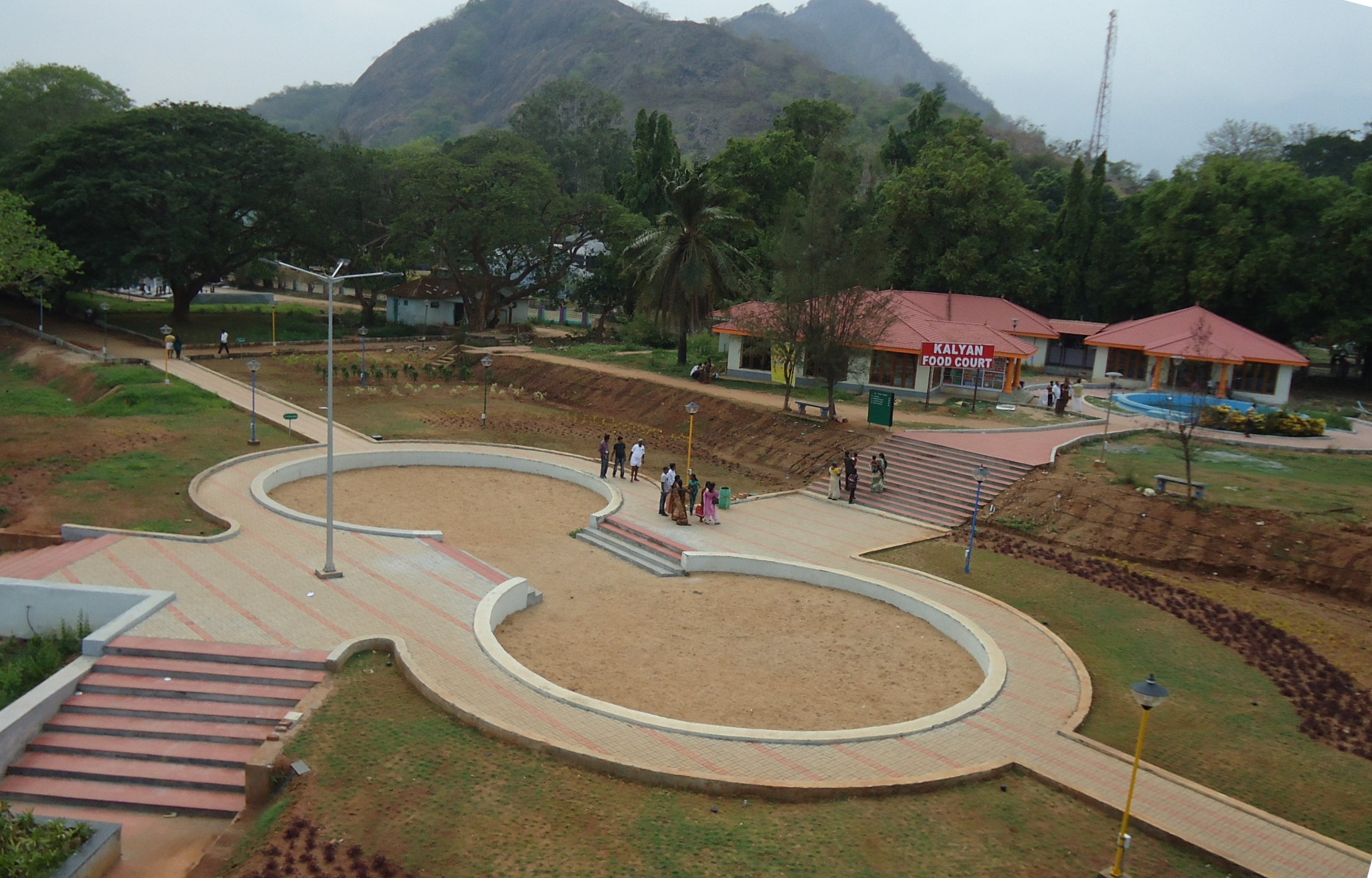
Sunken Garden

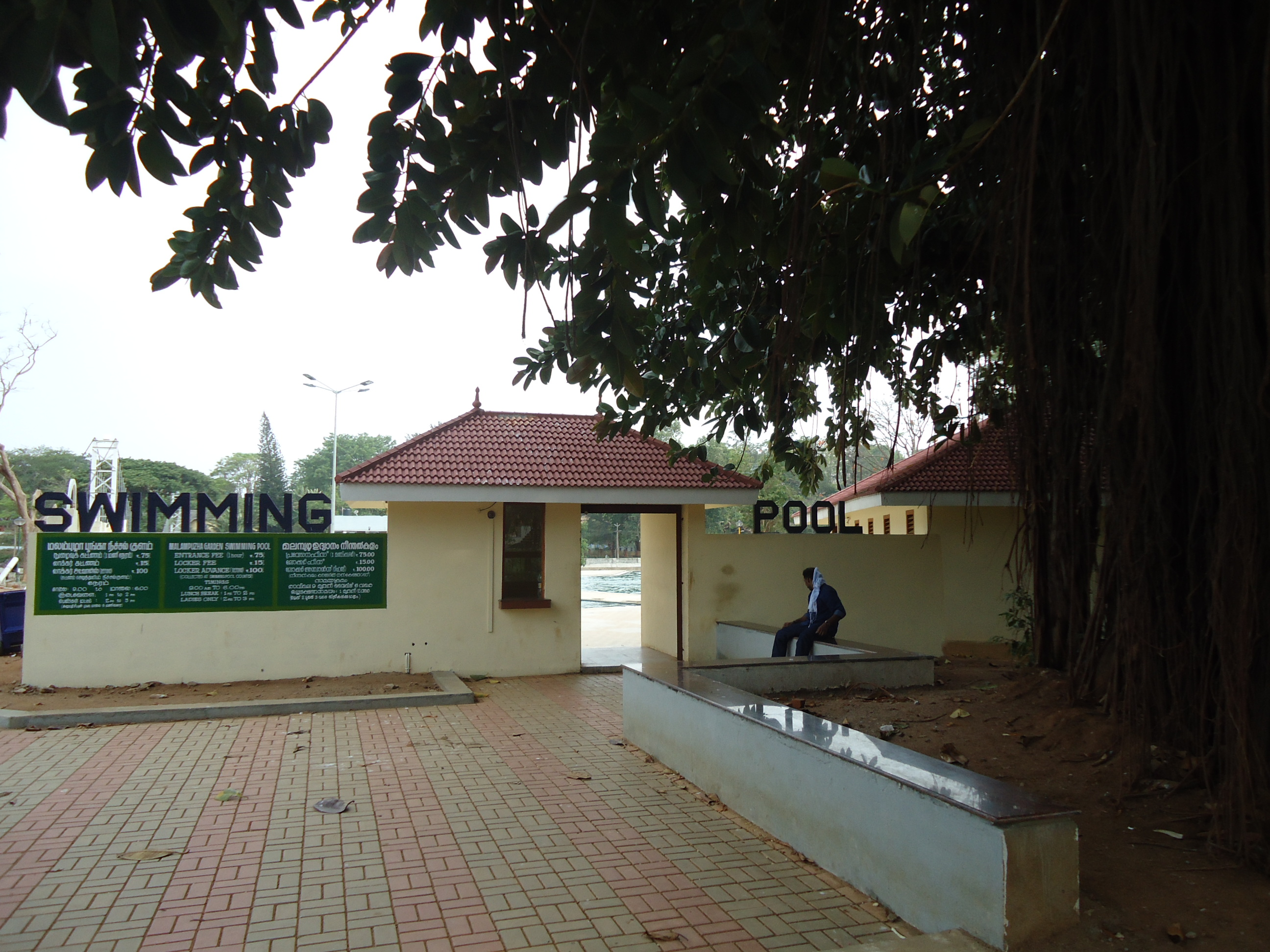
Swimming Pool

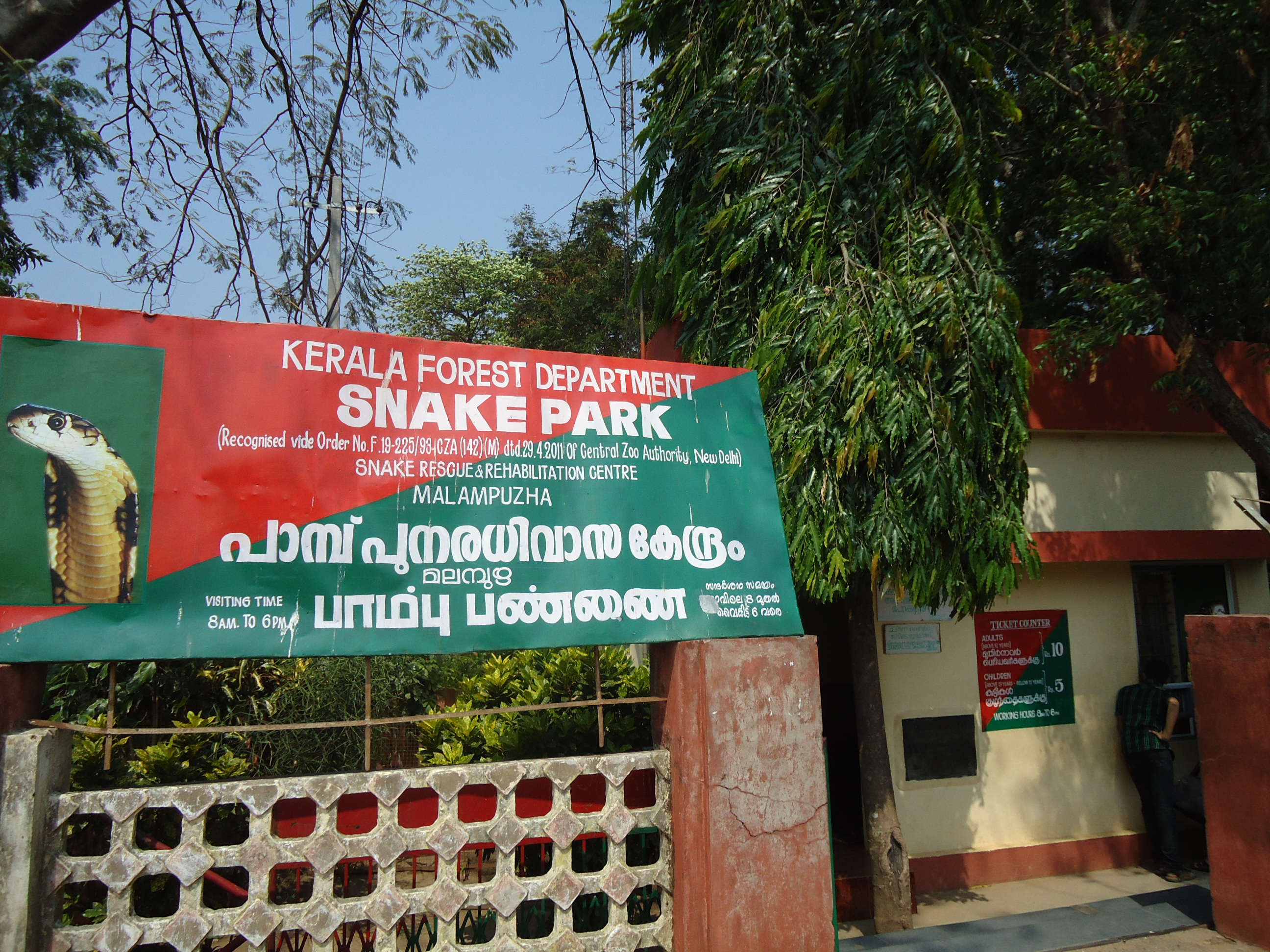
Snake Park

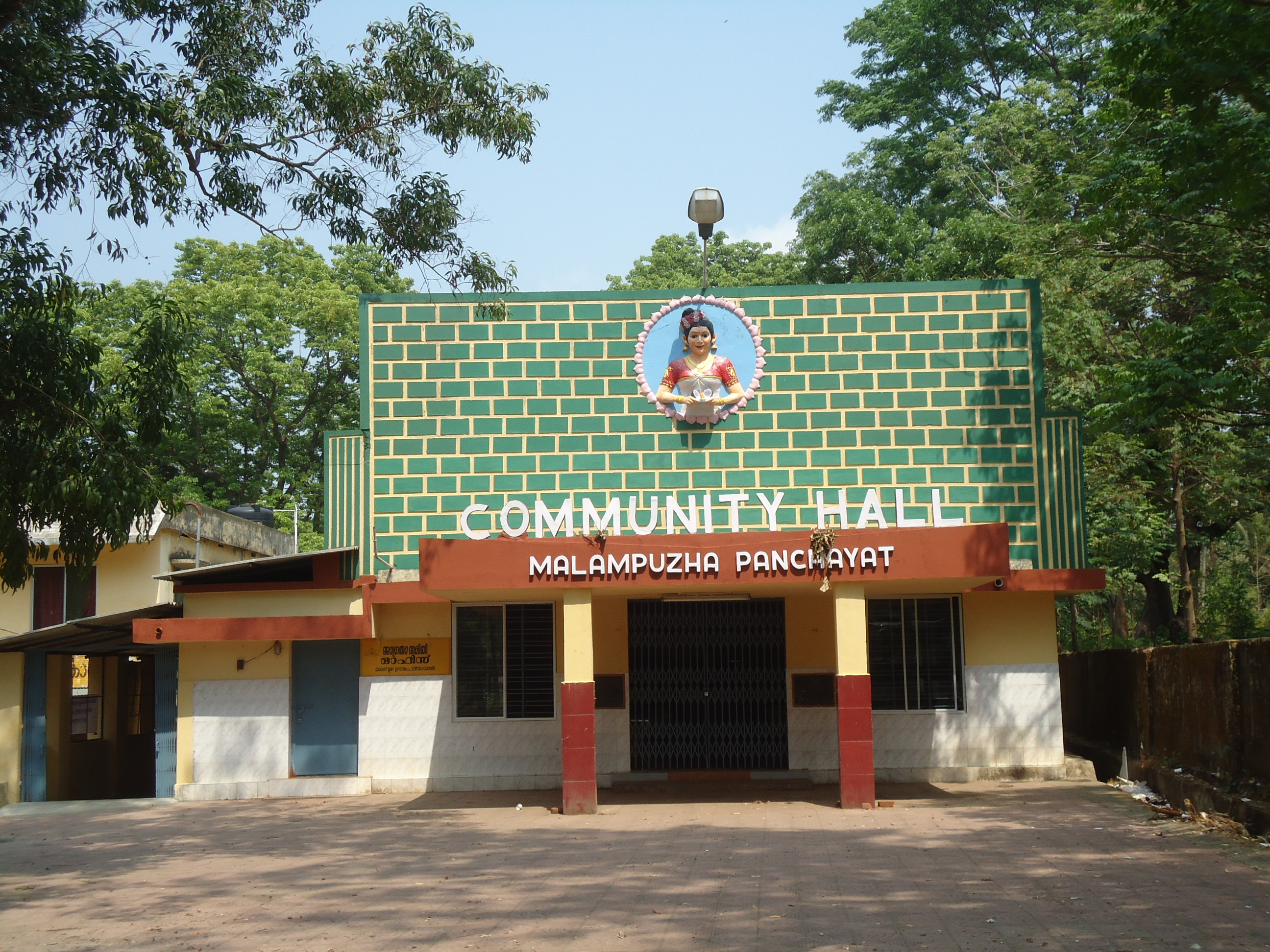
Village Hall

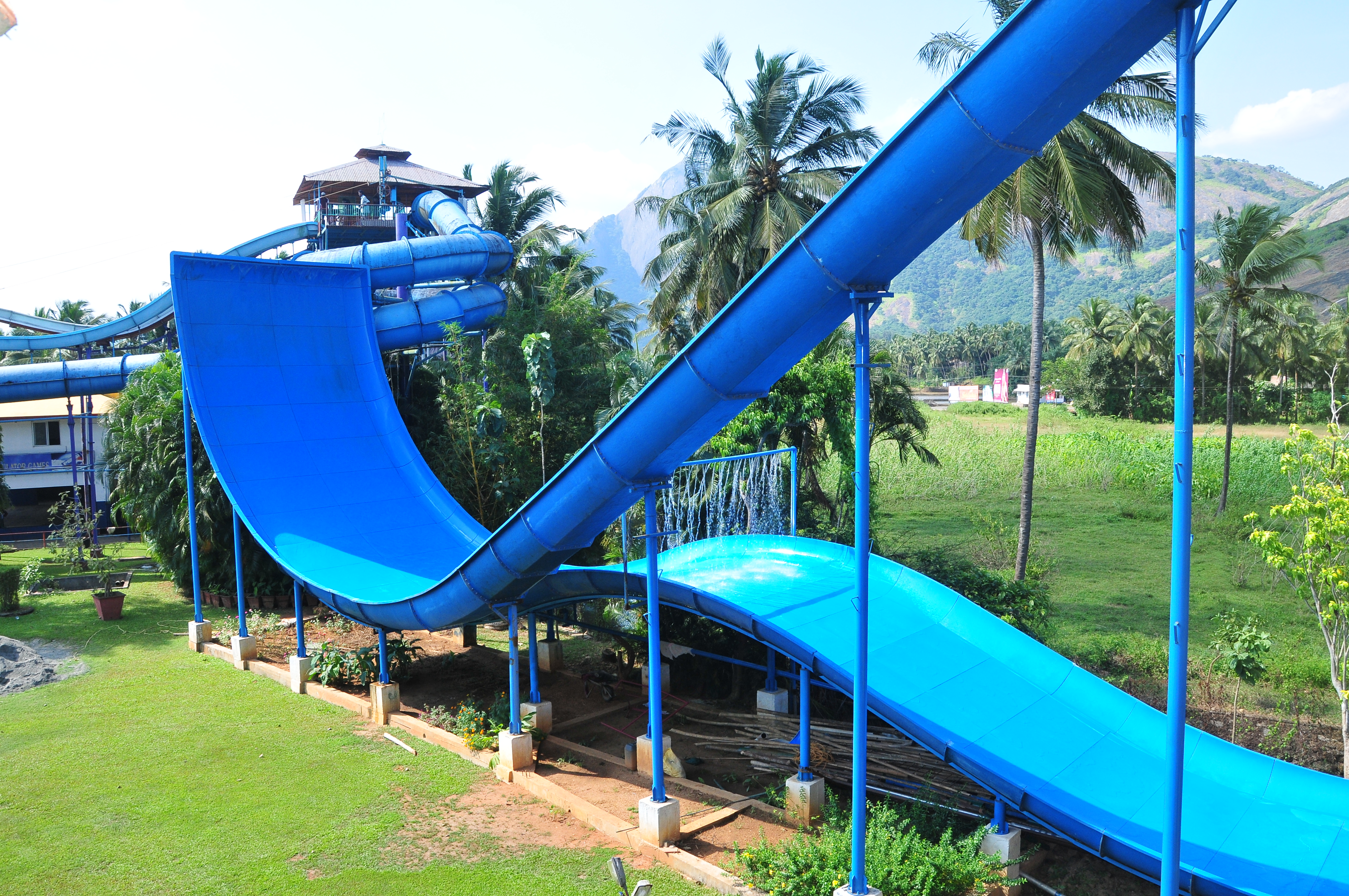
The Fantasy Park

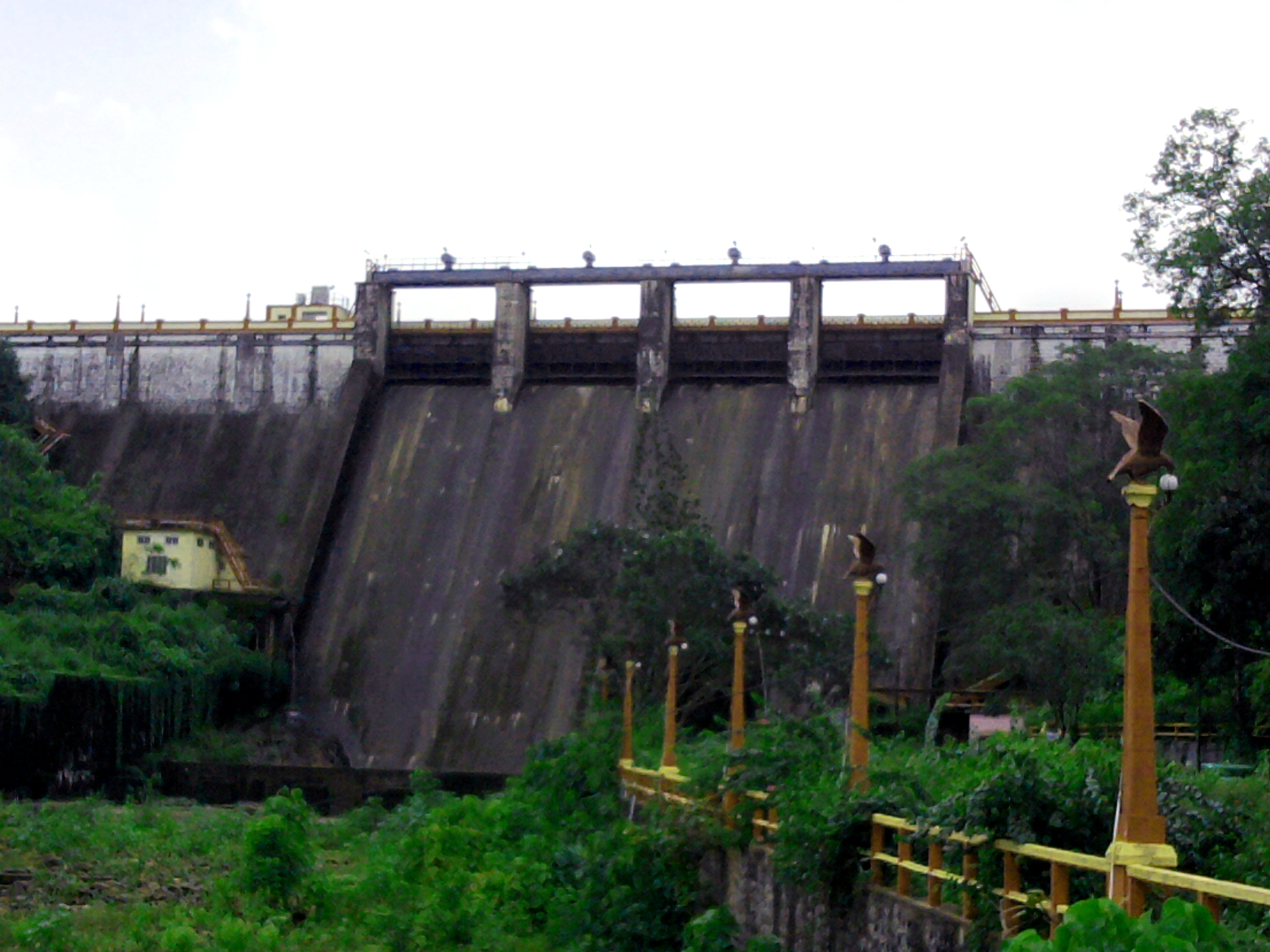
Malampuzha Dam

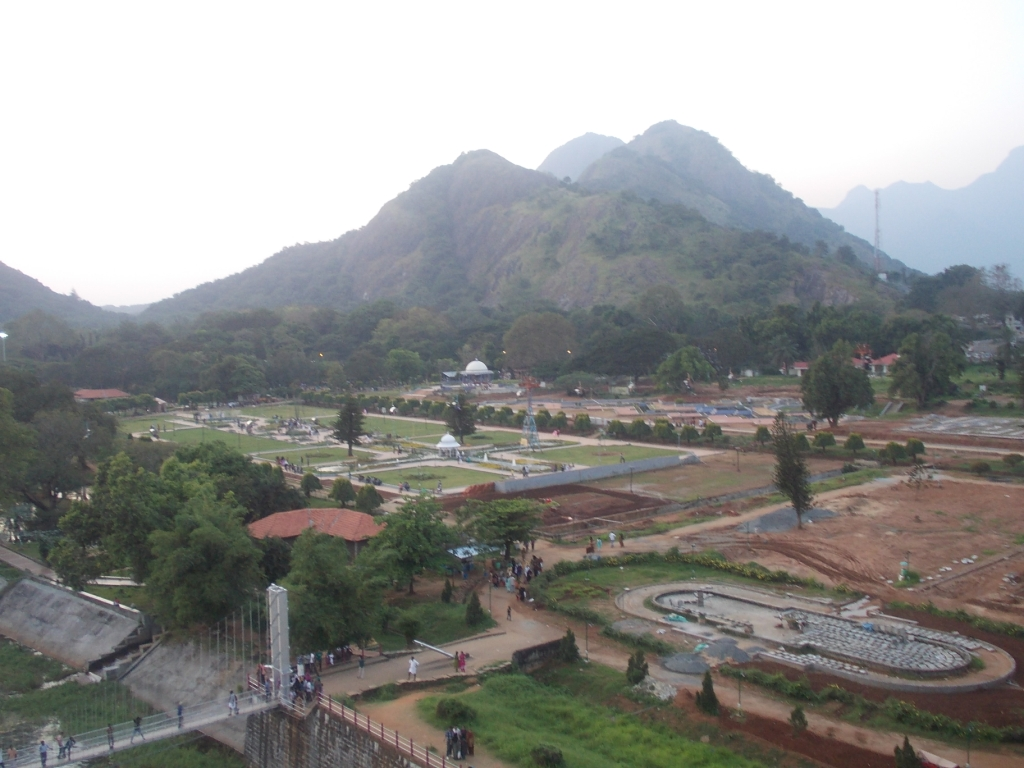
Malampuzha Garden

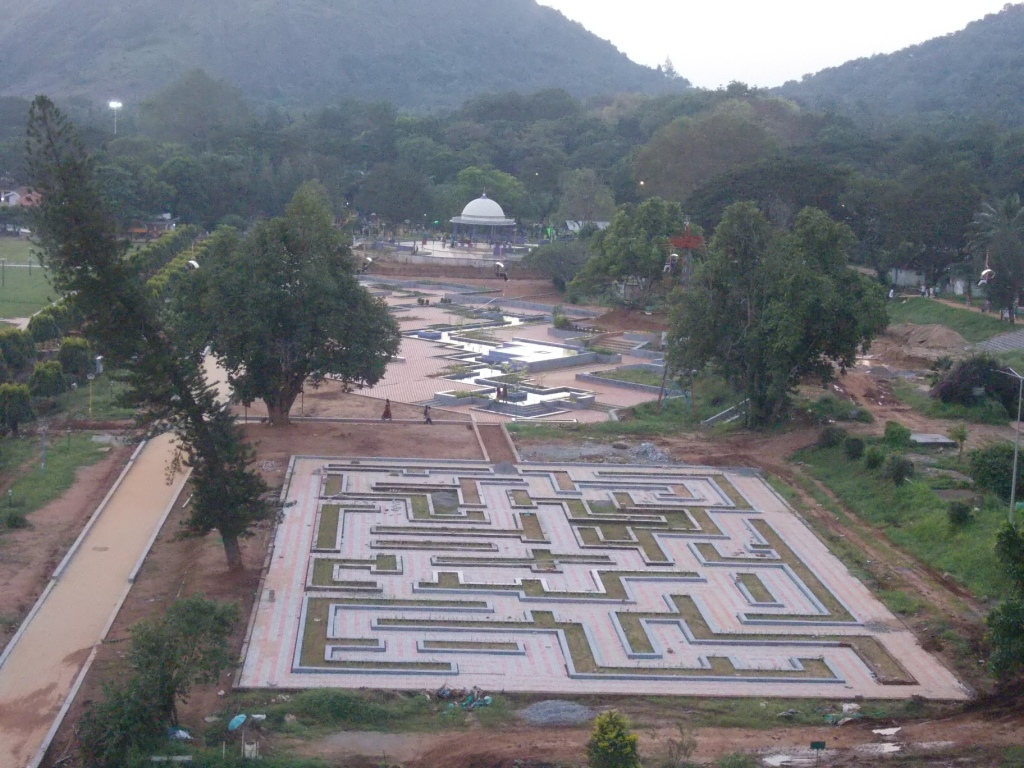
Garden

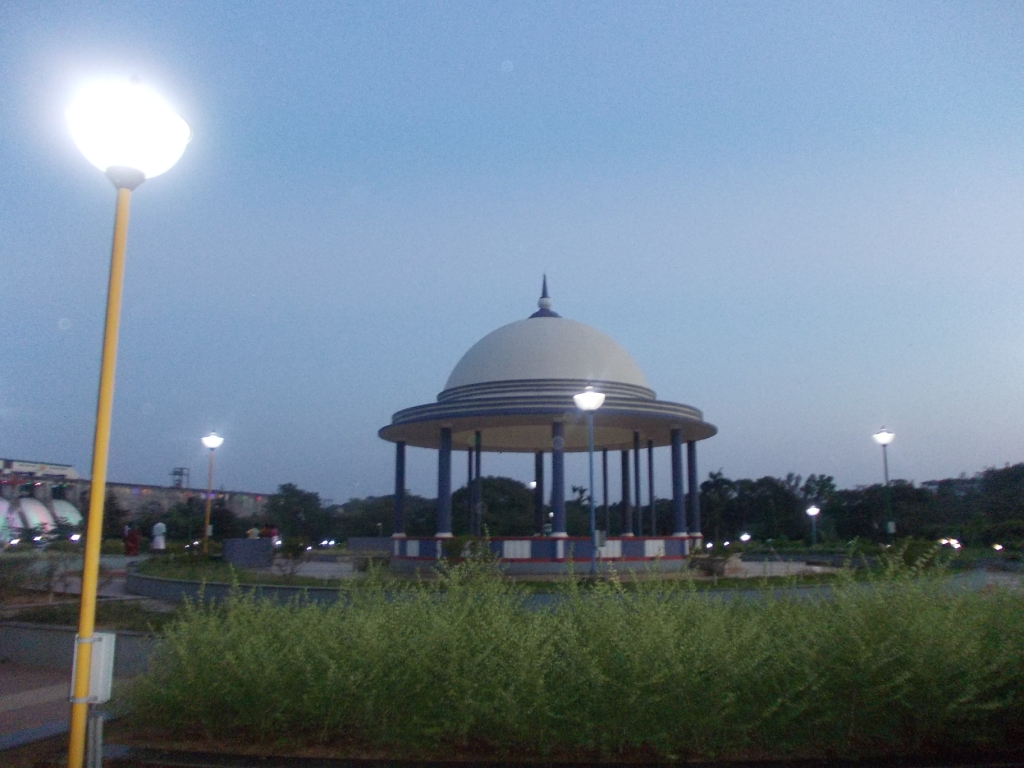
Garden

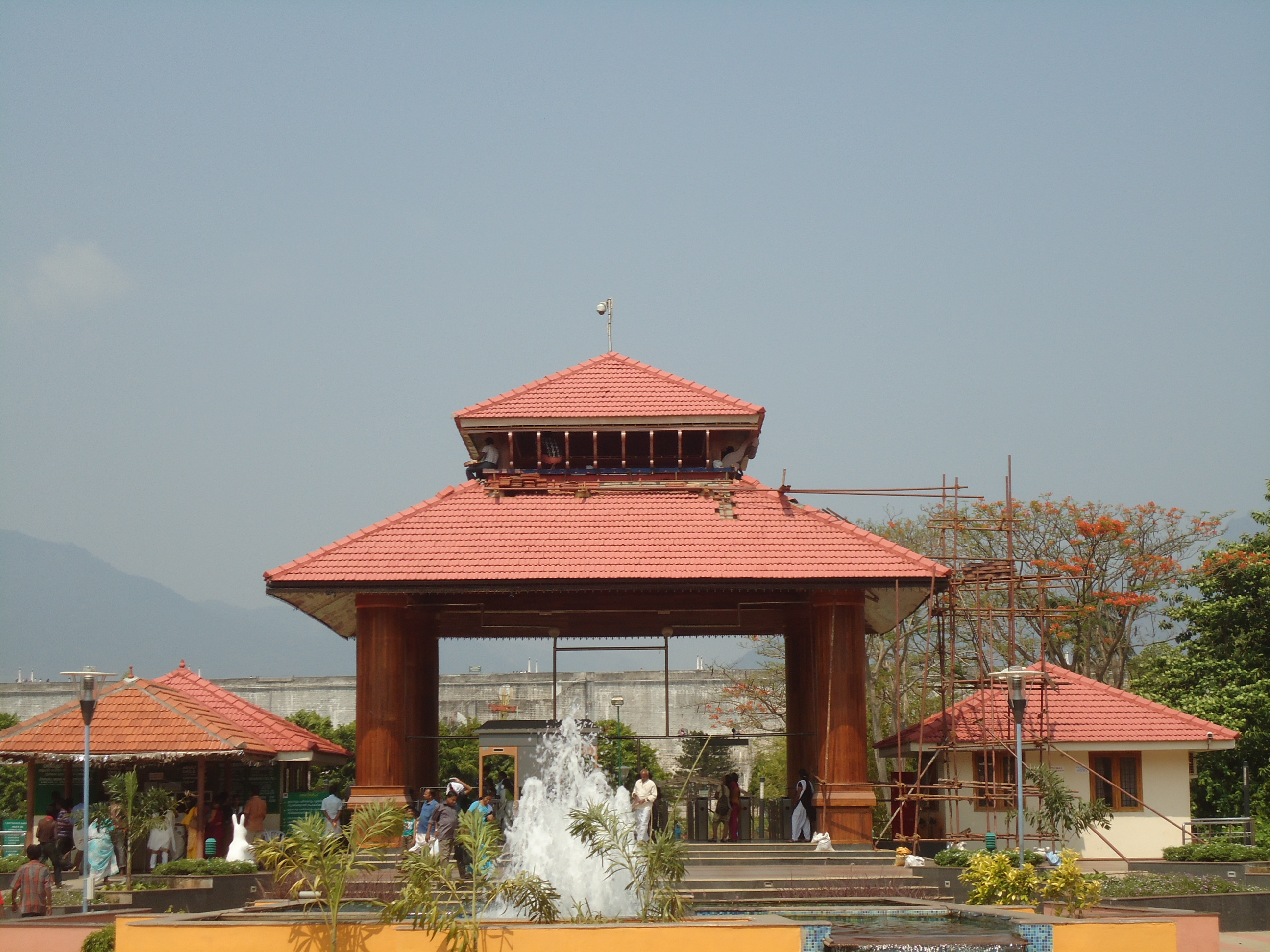
Malampuzha Dam Entrance

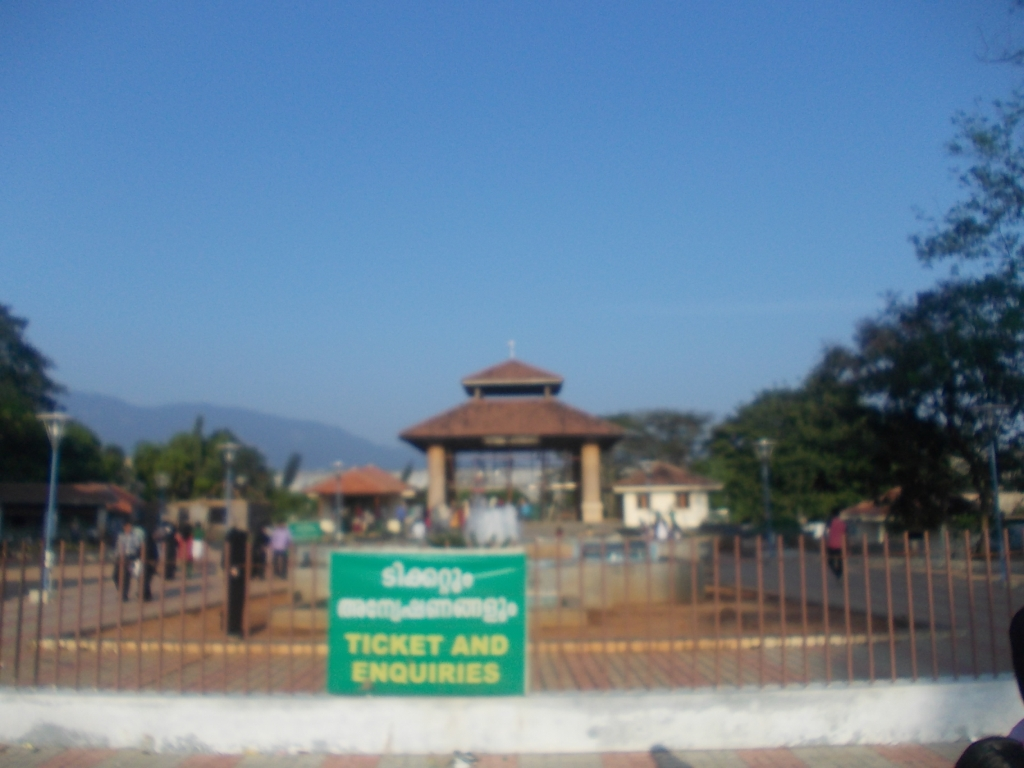
Entrance

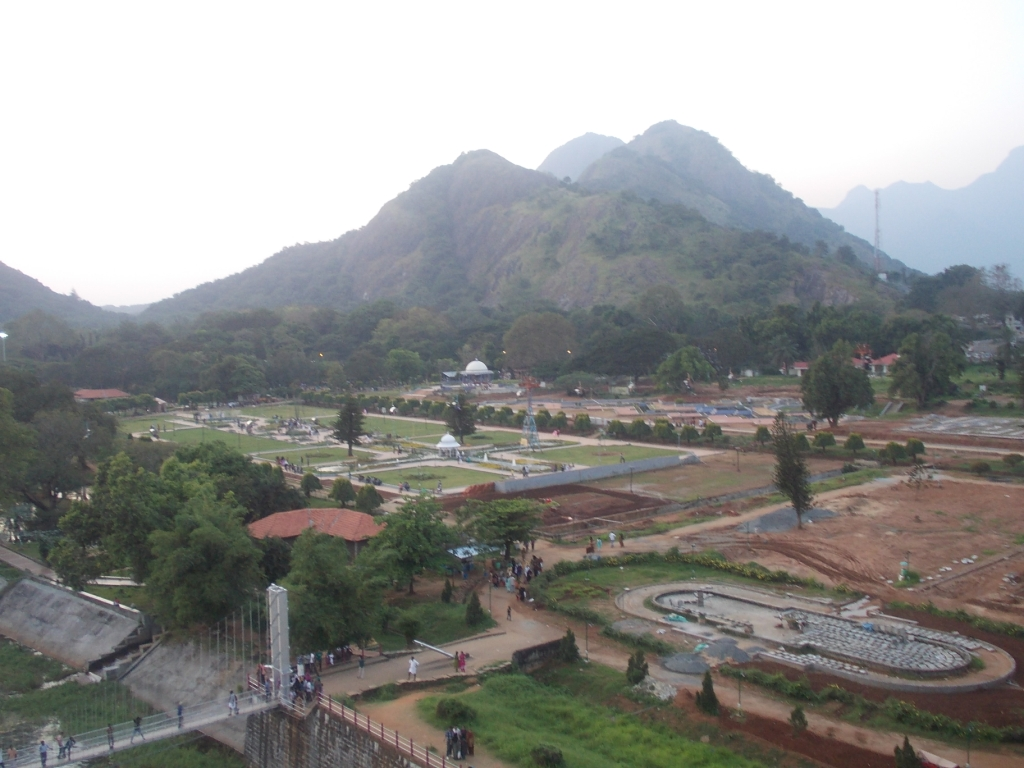
Garden

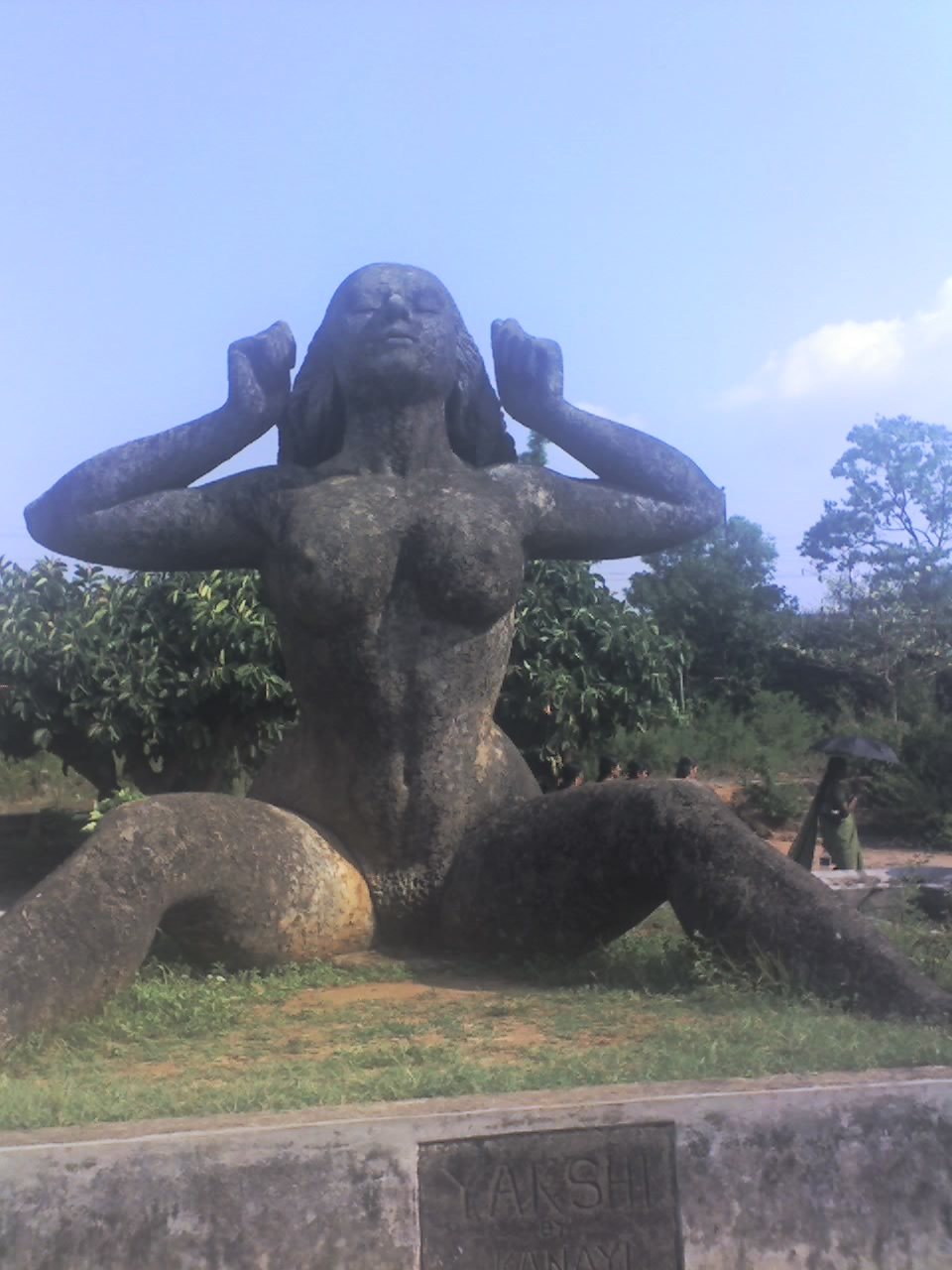
Yakshi sculpture

== See also ==
- List of dams and reservoirs in India
- Kuttippuram bridge
