= Neighbourhoods of Kochi =

This is a list of major areas and neighbourhoods in the city of Kochi by region. The eastern part of Kochi is mainly known as Ernakulam, while the western part of the city after the Venduruthy Bridge is called as Western Kochi.

== North Kochi ==
- Pachalam
- Elamakkara
- Cheranallur
- Palarivattom
- Edapally
- Kaloor
- Kalamassery

== Central Kochi ==
- Marine Drive, Kochi
- High Court Junction
- Thevara
- Panampilly Nagar
- Gandhi Nagar, Kochi
- Ravipuram
- Pachalam
- Kathrikadavu
- Thammanam
- Kadavanthra
- Kaloor
- Karanakodam
- Ernakulam North
- Ravipuram
- Ernakulam South
- Kalabhavan Road

== West Kochi ==
- Willingdon Island
- Fort Kochi
- Mattancherry
- Thoppumpady
- Cheriyakadavu
- Kannamaly
- Edakochi
- Perumpadappu
- Palluruthy
- Chellanam
- Kumbalangi
- Kattiparambu
- Chullickal

== South Kochi ==
- Kundannoor
- Maradu
- Thaikoodam metro station
- Chambakkara

== East Kochi ==
- Kakkanad
- Vennala
- Thrikkakara
- Vyttila
- Tripunithura
- Piravom

== Suburban Kochi ==
The Suburban Kochi includes minor places in the districts of Thrissur and Alappuzha also. Suburban Kochi is commonly called as Greater Kochi

=== Northern Suburbs of Kochi ===
- Aluva
- Angamaly
- North Paravur
- Eloor
- Koonammavu
- Vaduthala

=== Western Suburb of Kochi ===
- Vypin Island
- Cherai

=== Southern Suburbs of Kochi ===
- Cherthala
- Kumbalam
- Udayamperoor
- Panangad
- Eramallur
- Vaikom

=== Eastern Suburbs of Kochi ===
- Perumbavoor
- Eroor
- Thiruvankulam
- Kolenchery
- Mamala
- Kizhakkambalam
- Piravom
- Mulanthuruthy
- Chottanikkara

== Satellite Towns ==
- Kothamangalam
- Muvattupuzha
- Chalakudy
- Kodungallur
- Cherthala
- Thodupuzha

== Important Roads of Kochi ==
- Mahatma Gandhi Road
- Sahodaran Ayyappan Road
- Chittoor Road
- Shanmugham Road
- Kochi Bypass
- Kalabhavan Road
- Banerji Road
- Park Avenue
- Seaport-Airport Road
- International Container Terminal Road
- Infopark Expressway
