= Transport in Kochi =

Overview of transportation in Kochi

Overview
- Locale: Kochi and surrounding regions
- Transit type: Rapid transit, commuter rail, buses, private automobile, water metro, Taxicab, bicycle, pedestrian

Kochi (Malayalam: കൊച്ചി Kochi) is a major port city in the Indian state of Kerala. The city is widely known as the commercial or economic capital of the state of Kerala.

The road infrastructure in Kochi has not been able to meet the growing traffic demand and hence traffic congestion is a major problem in the city. A comprehensive transport development plan has been included in the Kochi Masterplan with the goal of improving the transport infrastructure. Kochi Metro, the rapid transit system for the city was inaugurated on 17 June 2017. A Suburban Railway system, intended to considerably ease congestion, is also to be built in the near future. Kochi won an award for being the city with most sustainable transport system, instituted by the Union ministry of housing and urban affairs in 2021. In April 2023, after the inauguration of Kochi Water Metro, Kochi became the only city in the country to have a water metro system along with the metro rail system. It is the first water metro system in India and the first integrated water transport system of this size in Asia.

== Roads ==
Most roads in Kochi are under the control of the city corporation, State PWD, and National Highways Authority of India. Many roads in the city follow a north–south direction with two east–west corridors.

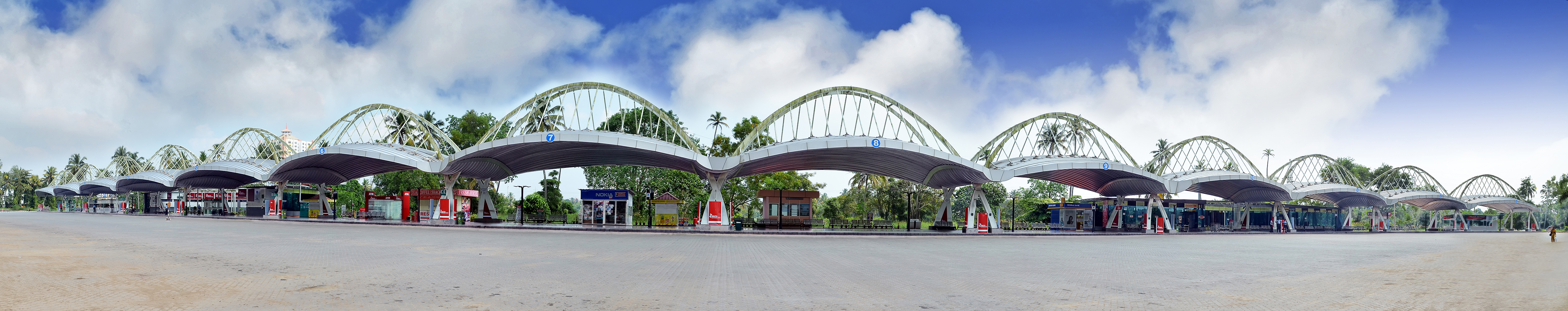
A panoramic view of Vyttila Mobility Hub

=== Highways ===
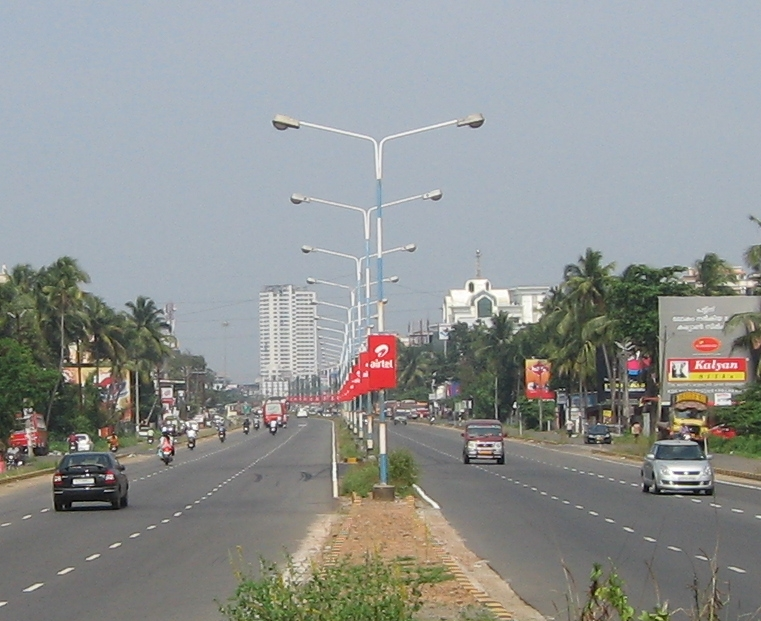
Kochi is part of the North-South Corridor of India's National Highway System via the NH 47

Kochi is part of the North-South Corridor of India's National Highway System via the NH 544. NH 66, the seventh longest highway in India, connects Kochi with Navi Mumbai, via Kozhikode and Mangaluru on the western coast of India. The NH 544 originating from Salem connects Kochi with cities like Coimbatore via Thrissur and Palakkad and also connects with state capital Thiruvananthapuram and after merging with NH 66 termi at Kanyakumari. NH 85 is another highway, connecting Kochi with Dhanushkodi in Tamil Nadu via Munnar and Madurai. Two smaller national highways, NH 966B connecting to Willingdon Island and NH 966A, connecting NH 544 to Vallarpadom from Kalamassery. NH 544 has a 17-kilometre-long (11 mi) bypass road connecting Aroor to Edappally junction. The city is also connected with several state highways like SH 15, SH 16, SH 41, SH 63, SH 66. The state government has constructed an expressway called Seaport-Airport Road running parallel to NH 544 bypass road at Maradu junction to Kalamasserry junction. Phase II, proposed an alternative road to directly to Airport. A second 2-kilometre-long (1.2 mi) four-lane road called Infopark Expressway has been constructed from Seaport-Airport Road to Infopark, which is planned to develop into a 15-kilometre-long (9.3 mi) east–west corridor in the future. The ever-increasing traffic congestion has necessitated the construction of flyovers at many key junctions on the national highways in Kochi. The works on Edapally flyover have been done and commissioned and a flyover has also been opened at Palarivattom junction.

=== City roads ===
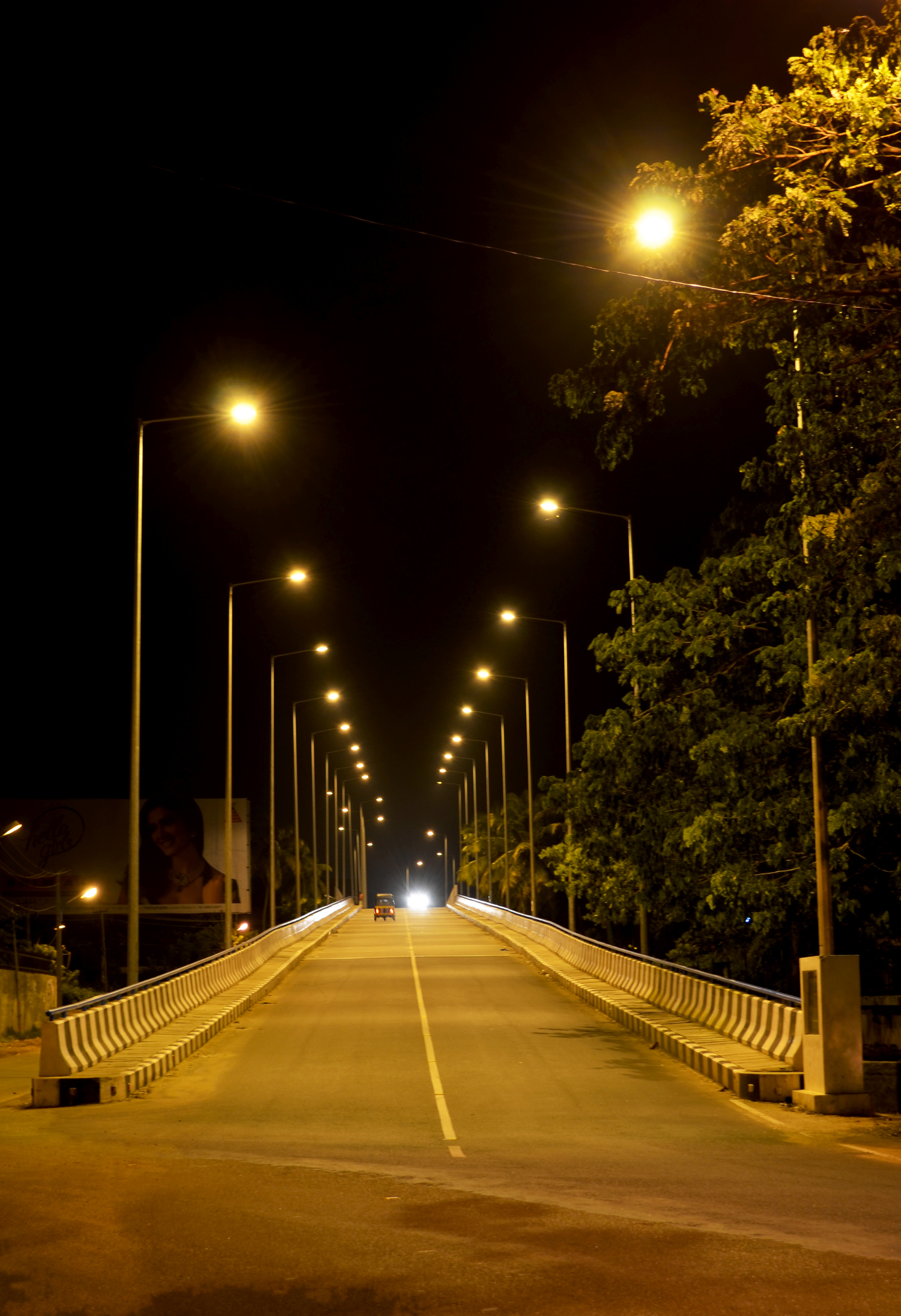
Railway Over Bridge Ernakulam (Salim Rajan Over Bridge)

Mahatma Gandhi Road is a 4-kilometre-long (2.5 mi) arterial road and commercial high street in Kochi, alongside which lies the CBD of the city. The 8.2-kilometre-long (5.1 mi) Chittoor Road is the oldest arterial road that connects the city to northern suburbs like Chittoor, Pachalam and Vaduthala. Another major arterial road is the 1.5-kilometre-long (0.93 mi) Marine Drive Road which extends southward as Park Avenue and Foreshore Roads and northward as the Marine drive bay road. The youngest arterial road is the 3.2-kilometre-long (2.0 mi) Kaloor-Kadavanthra Road, constructed in 2002 as an effort to reduce congestion at MG Road and Chittoor Road and provide an alternative for commuters to reach the major southern junction of Kadavanthra from the northern junction of Kaloor. The city has only 2 east–west corridors, creating one of the most congested traffic at the stretch. The 4-kilometre-long (2.5 mi) Sahodharan Ayyappan Road, the busiest and second most important arterial road connects MG Road to Kochi Bypass Road at Vytilla Junction at the southern side and the 5-kilometre-long (3.1 mi) Kaloor Road connects Banerji Road to NH 47 at Edappally Junction. The 17 km (11 mi) stretch of Edapally – Aroor bypass road has turned out to be an important arterial road in Kochi . A third east–west corridor is planned connecting MG Road with NH 47 known as Pullepady-Thammanam road, for which first phase has started with construction of Pullepady Rail-Over Bridge.

The main railway line cut Ernakulam city into 2 halves which are interconnected with three rail-over bridges (ROBs), which are one of the major bottlenecks due to being narrow bridges.

Fort Kochi has the maximum number of roads, mostly narrow in nature, due to presence of several heritage properties and thickly populated areas. Indira Gandhi Road is the main arterial road in Willingdon island that runs parallel to western coastal side of the island connecting Ernakulam Wharf with NH 966B.

=== Public transport ===
For transport within the city, buses and cabs are available throughout the day. Kochi's bus transport system is mainly dominated by private operators. Reckless driving and competitive tendency among red-buses has been heavily criticised by the public. Nonetheless, the system forms a major backbone of public transport.

The state's public transport company, KSRTC operates intracity and intercity bus services in Kochi. In 2010, KSRTC started city services due to frequent complaints against private buses, which has been praised for its efficient and controlled services. Thiru-Kochi, A basic no-frills KSRTC service, has the same fare system as private buses. These buses are distinguishable by their blue-white livery and were funded under the JNNURM scheme. KSRTC also operates premium air-conditioned low-floor bus services using Volvo 8400 buses procured under the JNNURM scheme on some routes.

As of 2011, 630 intra-buses were authorised to operate inside the city. The city also caters to nearly 2100 long-distance private buses, which include 466 inter-city state buses.

Most of the buses run primarily on four major routes, known as the Big 4 routes, though there are 160 official authorised routes to operate connecting 60 destinations in the city and nearby suburbs. The most popular route is the Aluva-Fort Kochi Route, which covers almost all the city areas. There is no routing numbering system, rather all buses carry destination boards with important bus stops marked below.

The city has primarily five major bus stations:

- Kaloor Bus station which is a major terminus used by privately operated long-distance buses and local red-buses. It is also a major stop for private mofussil services.
- KSRTC Central Bus Station in the south, which is exclusively operated by KSRTC inter-state/inter-city buses. Buses of neighbouring state transport corporations also operates their services from this bus station.
- KSRTC Jetty Station, located near Central Boat Jetty in Park Avenue, is used by KSRTC city and short-distance services.
- Fort Kochi Bus Terminus, located near Fort Kochi beach, is a major bus station for both private and KSRTC City services.
- Vyttila Mobility Hub, a large integrated public transport terminus which was built at Vytilla to ease congestion within the city limits, acts as a converging point for various modes of public transportation like intra-city and long-distance buses, metro rail and boat services. The Vyttila stations of the Kochi Metro and Kochi Water Metro are situated at the hub.

On-street Taxi cabs are rare but can be easily hired from taxi stands located all over the city. Popular online taxi aggregation apps like Uber, Ola Cabs and others operate ride hailing services for taxis and auto rickshaws. Auto rickshaws can also be hailed on the street, and CNG (green and yellow/black) and electric (white and blue) Auto rickshaws are also becoming commonplace in the city.

Like many other cities, two-wheeler vehicles like motor bikes, scooters, cycles contribute 35% of the vehicle population in the city, which is extremely popularly among the locals. Kochi being a major financial and commercial center, there is a sharp rise in private vehicles plying on the city roads thereby contributing to road congestion.

== Kochi Port ==
Being one of the safest harbours in the Arabian Sea, Kochi ranks among India's major seaports. It is the first transshipment terminal in India. The port, administered by a statutory autonomous body known as the Cochin Port Trust, offers facilities like berths for handling cargo and passenger ships, cargo handling equipment, storage accommodation, dry dock, bunkering facilities, and a fisheries harbour. Cochin Port regularly handles various international passenger cruisers. As of 2019, Spectrum of the Seas, is the largest passenger cruiser to call at Kochi. Kochi is the first home port in India to operate international cruises. The service was started in December 2009 and was operated by Louis Cruises with regular trips to Maldives and Sri Lanka.

A container transshipment facility, known as International Container Transshipment Terminal, Kochi has been commissioned at Vallarpadom. Being constructed in three stages, the first phase of the terminal was commissioned on 11 Feb 2011. This can handle cargo up to one million TEUs (twenty-foot equivalent units) per annum. On completion of the third phase, the terminal will be able to handle 4 million TEUs of cargo per annum. The terminal is presently being operated by the Dubai Ports World (DPW), which will operate it for 30-years after which the control will come back to the Cochin Port Trust.

The Kochi International Marina is a marina in the city of Kochi. It is located in the eastern coast of the Bolgatty Island in the premises of the Bolgatty Palace, a 'heritage hotel'. The Kochi Marina is the only marina in India. It is owned by the Kerala Tourism Development Corporation. The marina provides berthing facility for yachts and also offers services like fuel, water, electricity and sewage pump-outs for boats. The marina is close to the international maritime route at the south west coast of the Indian Peninsula, with favourable conditions and minimum tidal variations throughout the year.

== Airports ==
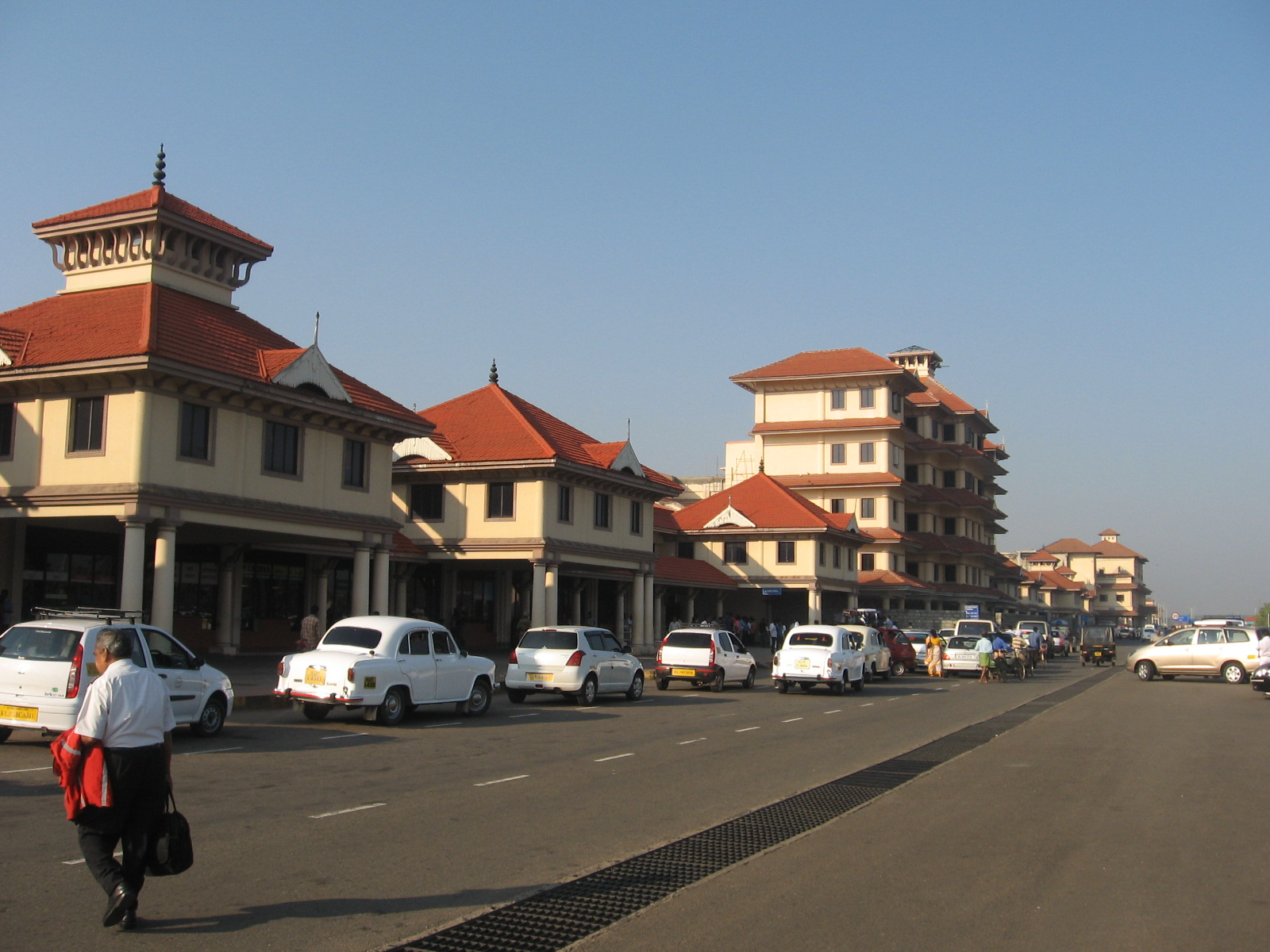
Outside view of the Cochin International Airport at Nedumbassery.

Kochi has an international airport, Cochin International Airport (IATA: COK, ICAO: VOCI), which is about 25 km north of the city. Unlike most Indian airports (which are controlled by the Airports Authority of India), Kochi airport is owned by Cochin International Airport Limited, a public limited company owned by a large number of Non Resident Indians, major Indian corporations, and the government of Kerala (which holds a majority interest). It is thus the first international airport in India built without Central Government funds. Having a 3,400-metre runway, one of the largest in Asia, the airport is equipped to operate any type of aircraft. It currently is the fourth busiest International airport in India. Currently in expansion mode, the airport has been made ready to accommodate the super jumbo Airbus 380. The Airport is connected with most of the cities in the Middle East and Southeast Asia with nearly sixteen international flight carriers operating to the city. Apart from this, the city is well connected to all major metros and cities of India with seven domestic carriers operating nationwide air services. On 18 August 2015, it became the world's first fully solar energy powered airport with the inauguration of the dedicated solar plant.

The city also has a second airport, INS Garuda, operated by the Indian Navy, whose southern headquarters is located in Kochi. Commissioned on 11 May 1953, it is the oldest operating air station of the Indian Navy. This airport is however not open to the public, and is solely used by the navy and by important government dignitaries visiting the city. A civilian enclave used to operate here but with the construction of the new airport, most activities have ceased save for the occasional patrols by naval Dornier Do 228 of INAS 550 and regular flights by Naval Helicopters of the 336 and 321 squadrons . A pair of Heron UAV's are also stationed here.

== Ferry ==
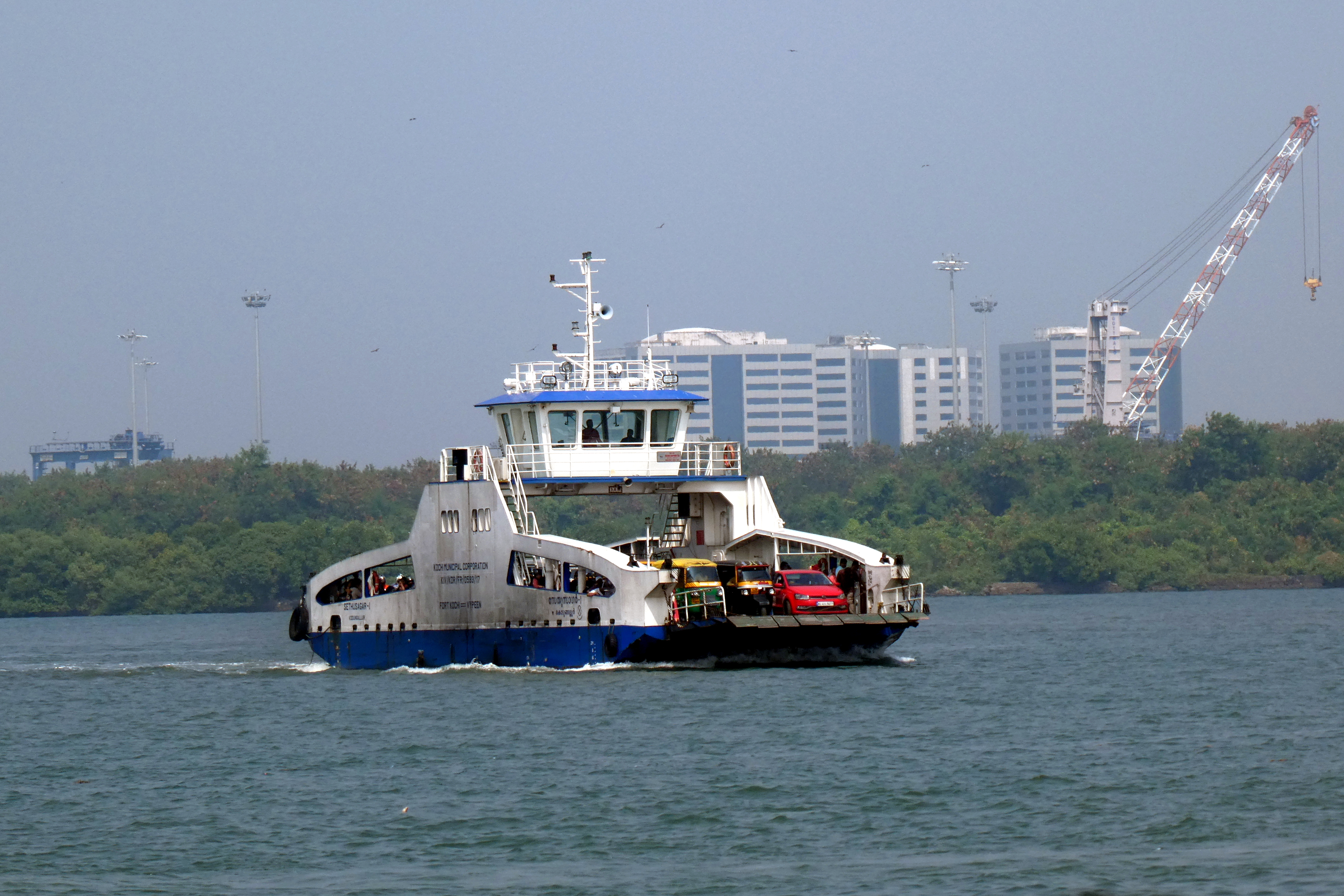
A ferry connects Vypin with Fort Kochi

Apart from international cruises, domestic ferry and cruises operate in Kochi. Regular inter-island boat services operated by Kerala Shipping and Inland Navigation Corporation (KSINC), the state Water Transport Authority, and of private ownership are available from the Kerala High Court Jetty and the Ernakulam Central jetty at Park Avenue to various places. The Junkar ferry for the transshipment of vehicles and passengers between the various islands are operated between Ernakulam and Vypin, and between Vypin and Fort Kochi. However, construction of the Goshree bridges (which links Kochi's various islands) has made ferry transport less important. Backwaters cruises are one of the most important tourist activities in the city. KSINC operates large luxury cruise vessel called Sagar-Rani for high seas cruise parties. Apart from KSINC, numerous of private operators provide private cruise vessels for short leisure trips across the backwaters.

Kochi Water Metro, the first integrated water transport system in India, was opened to public on 25 April 2023 by Narendra Modi, the Prime Minister of India. As of May 2025, nine stations are in operation.

== Railways ==
At present, there is no intra-city rail transport system in Kochi. The inter-city rail transport system in the city is administered by the Southern Railway Zone of the Indian Railways. The major railway stations in Kochi metropolitan area are – Ernakulam Junction, Aluva, and Ernakulam Town, followed by less busier stations at Tripunithura and Angamaly and passenger halt stations at Edappally and Kalamassery. The South Railway Station is one of the busiest railway stations in South India, with more than 128 scheduled train services daily. The Junction Railway station currently has six platforms with two terminal gates. The main terminal located on the western side is the older structure, constructed in 1932. A food plaza and reservation counter are located on the west side. The East terminal is a new structure, constructed by GCDA, as a counter-measure to reduce traffic congestion on the South Rail-Over Bridge, by allowing passengers from the eastern side to access the east gate. However the terminal is not fully open to the public.

The North Railway Station is another station situated in the northern side of the city, mainly catering to long-distance services that bypass the Ernakulam Junction, and also as an additional halt station for many trains. A larger terminal in north has been opened to the public as of 27 November 2010. Cochin Harbour Terminus located in Willingdon island is the third railway station in the city, though it has been closed down temporarily. Cochin Harbour Terminus is a heritage structure constructed by the British in 1946. Due to the presence of a few cracks on the Venduruthy Railway bridge connecting the mainland with the Willingdon island, the service to this station was temporarily suspended. Work on a new railway line has commenced and the station will be reopened soon. Edapally Railway Station is a smaller halt station for passenger services and a few express trains. The major stations at Aluva, Angamaly and Thripunithura and the halting station at Kalamassery, serves the outskirts of the city and the surrounding metropolitan area.

There is a historic station named as Ernakulam Terminus (station code ERG) situated behind the High Court. Great personalities like Mahatma Gandhi and The Viceroy have visited Cochin through this old majestic railway station. Ernakulam Terminus was the first station to serve the city but had to be abandoned in the early 60's. Now, Southern Railway plans to renovate the station into the central station for the city and for proposed suburban railway system, because the pressure on the Ernakulam Junction railway station has been increasing.

In addition, the Southern Railway is set to start a suburban railway system in Ernakulam, connecting nearby towns and cities by introducing MEMU services. The first MEMU line between Ernakulam and Kollam was opened in 2012 and a second one between Ernakulam and Palakkad was started in 2013 Other MEMU lines under consideration include Thrissur-Ernakulam and Ernakulam-Kottayam corridors for which work is underway.

== Kochi Metro Rail ==
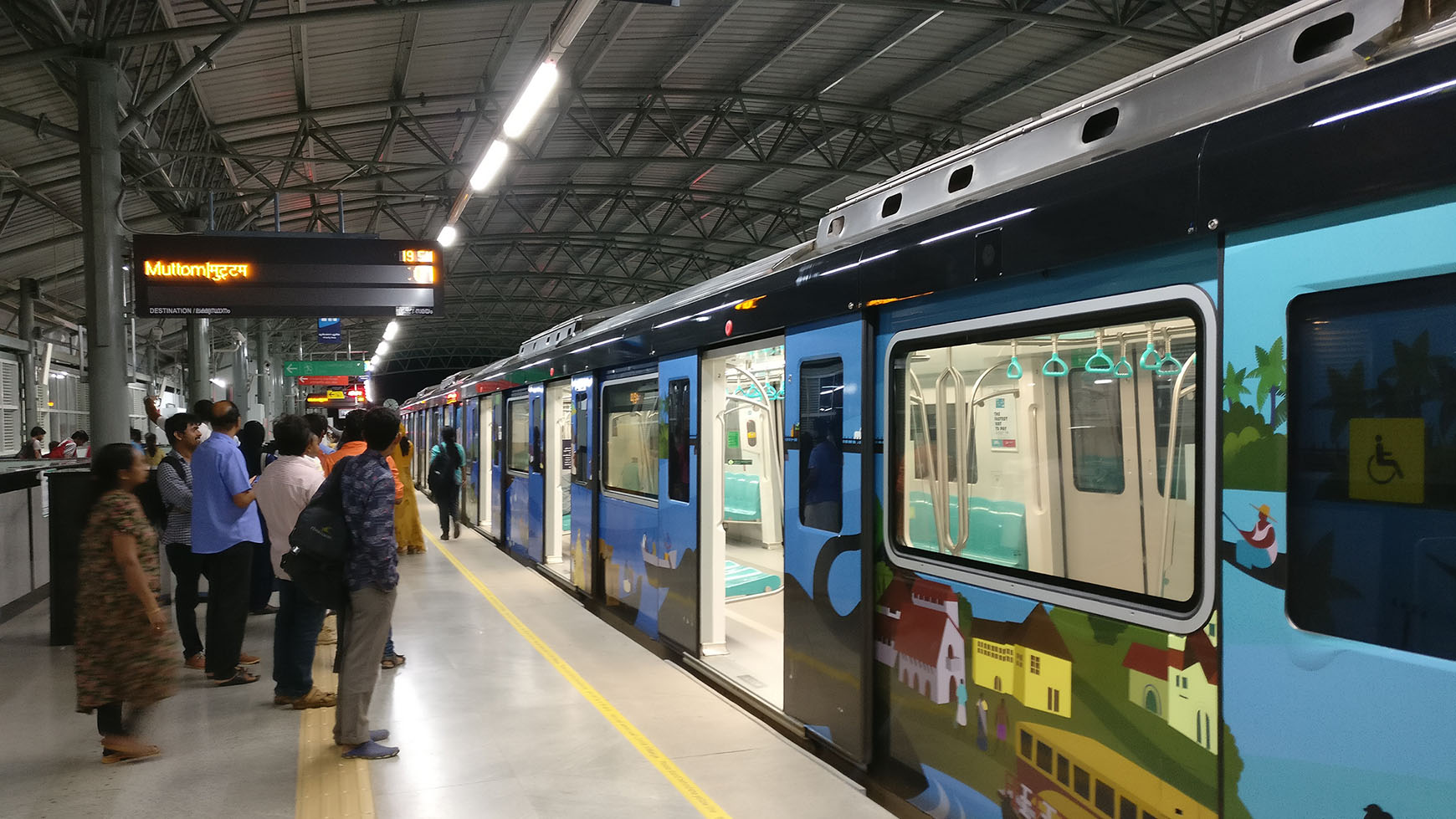
A train halted at Aluva station

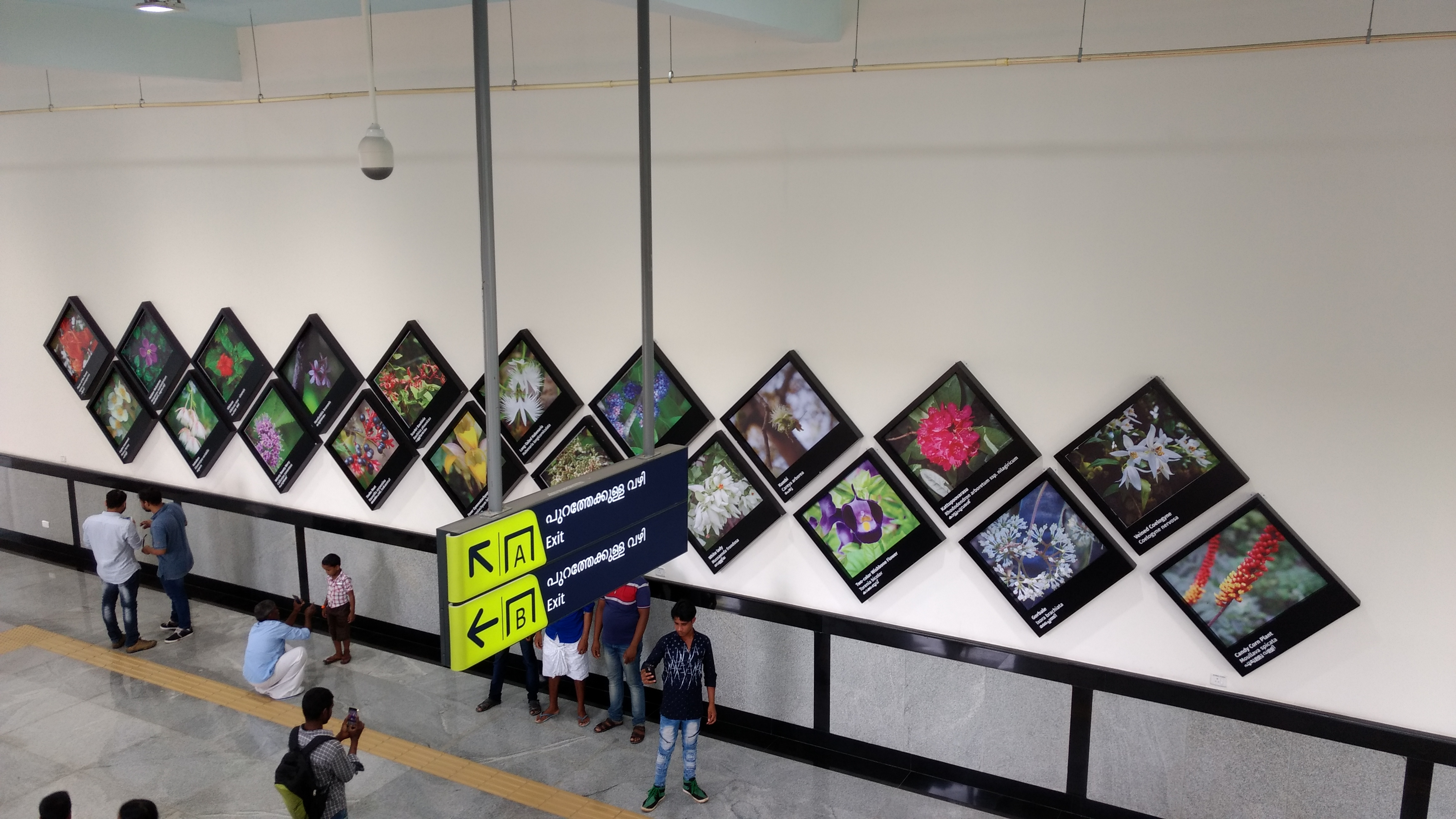
Inside Palarivattom station

A rapid transit system, intended to considerably ease congestion was opened to public on 17 June 2017 by Narendra Modi, the Prime Minister of India. As of May 2025, 25 stations from Aluva to Thrippunithara Terminal are active. The first phase serves a distance of 28 km with a total of 25 stations. The first phase was set up at an estimated cost of INR5181 crore (US$790 million). It has also been decided that A INR135 crore (US$21 million) flyover was also built at Edappally by DMRC will build an to ease the traffic congestion.

The 11.2-km Phase-II will be from Jawaharlal Nehru Stadium (Kochi) at Kaloor to Infopark via Kakkanad at an estimated cost of Rs. 2,017.46 crore.

== Distance from Kochi to major cities/towns & tourist centres ==
City/Town	Distance (km)	City/Town	Distance (km)	City/Town	Distance (km)	City/Town	Distance (km)	City/Town	Distance (km)
Ahmedabad	1881	Kanyakumari	307	Madurai	270	Panaji (Goa)	842	Tirupati	730
Alapuzha	63	Kannur	264	Malampuzha	153	Sabarimala	211	Tuticorin	304
Bangalore	533	Kodaikanal	330	Mangalore	439	Salem	358	Varanasi	2312
Chennai	684	Kolkata	2360	Mumbai	1384	Thekkady	190	Visakhapatnam	1432
Coimbatore	202	Kollam	150	Munnar	130	Thiruvananthapuram	221	Mysore	394
Delhi	2594	Kottayam	63	Mysore	397	Thrissur	79	Patna	2609
Guruvayoor	85	Kozhikode	172	Ooty	281		135	Tirur	395
Hyderabad	1095	Kumarakom	77	Palakkad	163	Thirunelveli	286	Tiruchirappalli (Trichy, Tiruchi)	395
