= S.A Road =

Major arteial road of Kochi

Sahodaran Ayyappan Road

Route information
- Length: 3.2 km (2.0 mi)

Major junctions
- MG Road; Vyttila

Location
- Country: India
- State: Kerala

Highway system
- Roads in India; Expressways; National; State; Asian; State Highways in Kerala

Sahodaran Ayyappan Road, popularly known as S.A Road is one of the most important arterial road of the city of Kochi. It runs in east-west direction connecting MG Road in west with Vyttila in east.

Kochi's major housing colonies are all branched out from this arterial road such as Panampilly Nagar, Giri Nagar, Gandhi Nagar and Jawahar Nagar.

Greater Cochin Development Authority (GCDA) & Rajiv Gandhi Indoor Stadium are located along this road at Kadavanthra. This four lane road is one of the oldest road of the city and covers a distance of 3.2 km. It is named after the social reformer Sahodaran Ayyappan.

== History ==
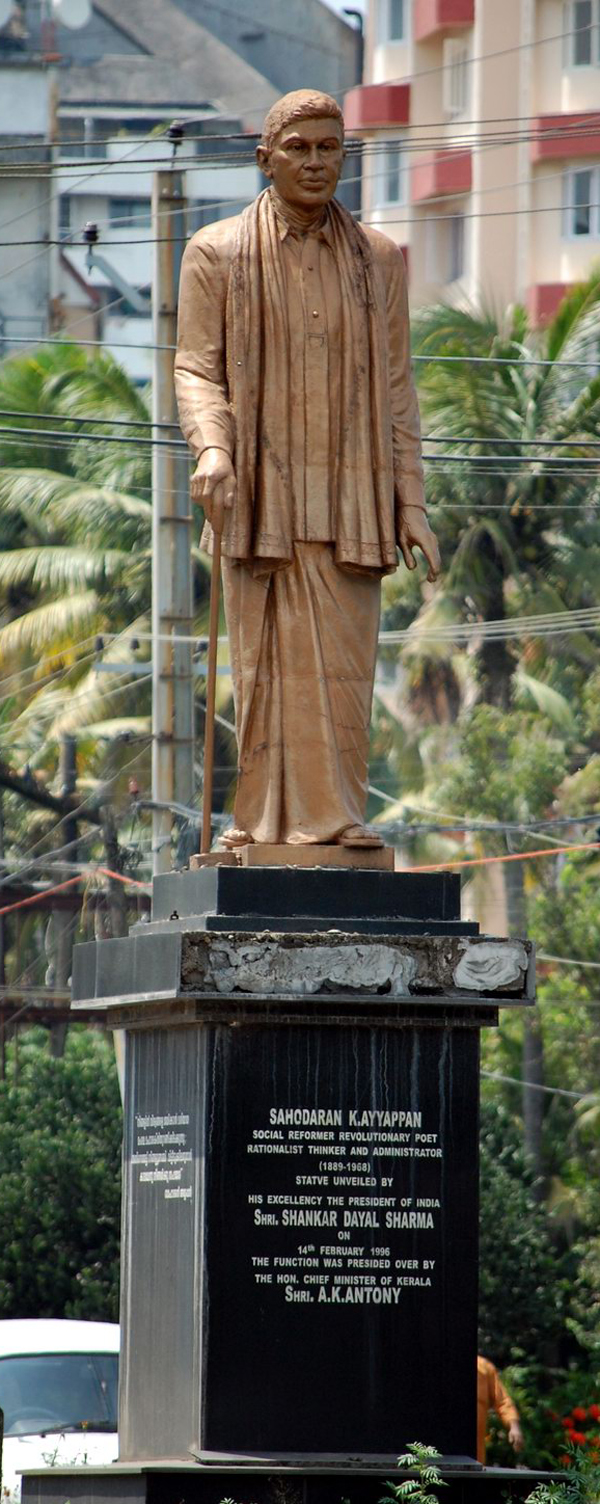
Sahodharan Ayyappan after whom the road is named

S.A. Road was earlier known as Tripunithura Road that was built by Kochi Royal Maramattu (PWD) Department in year 1863 when the capital of Kingdom of Cochin was shifted to Tripunithura. The road was constructed to facilitate the King's annual procession to Ernakulam for attending the Annual Durbar at the Durbar Hall. The original road terminated at Chittoor Road near Valanjambalam from where it connect to Durbar Hall Ground. Later it was extended to MG Road, when the Britishers constructed in year 1926. A connecting road from MG Road to Foreshore road was built when the latter was opened in the year 1988. In 1962 the stretch from Foreshore Road to Vyttila was renamed as S.A Road as this part came under Corporation of Cochin whereas the remaining stretch went to Thrippunithura Municipality.

The original road was just a single lane as there was no cars other than those belonging to Royal family. In year 1936, the road was relaid into 2 lane traffic, which remains even today. As the city grew, many commercial establishments started in this stretch which increased the traffic. Moreover, with opening of Panampally Nagar, Giri Nagar, Kadavanthra residential areas along with growth of Vyttila Junction made the road terribly congested heavy traffic. With less availability of land on both sides, land acquisition became extremely difficult.

In year 2000, the Corporation of Cochin decided to go ahead with forcible land acquisitions, thereby the stretch from South Overbridge to Vyttila was able to relay into 4 lane road with some areas still under construction.

== Major Junctions/Landmarks ==
- Vyttila Junction, from where SA Road starts in the east. Vyttila Junction is one of largest junction in Kerala, built in 1997 by National Highways Authority of India (NHAI) as part of the NH 47 bypass road.
- Janatha Junction
- Elamkulam Bridge built over picturesque Chilavannoor Lake, one of the important riverfront area.
- Elamkulam Junction
- Kadavanthra Junction, one of the busiest and most important junction in city of Kochi. It is one of the emerging commercial highstreet with several leading retail stores and many luxury 5 star classified hotels operating like the Olive Downtown, Radisson Blu etc. The Kaloor-Kadvanthara road starts from this junction, which is the shortest route to Kaloor. The GCDA headquarters and the statue of Sahodharan Ayyappan are located here. Entrances to posh residential areas like Panampilly Nagar, Giri Nagar, GCDA Nagar starts from here. A secondary junction called Kochukadavanthara, Rajiv Gandhi International Indoor sports complex, "Central bank of India" in Kallelil building and other prominent banks are also situated here.
- Manorama Junction, the major junction before South Railway Overbridge connects to major residential belt Panampally Nagar. The Manorama Newspaper office located here contributed name to this junction.
- South Overbridge, was the first railway overbridge in the city. The overbridge was built by Southern Railways without enough planning, resulting in executing poorly designed bridge, causing much of traffic bottleneck and terrible congestion. However it is one of the main entry into CBD.
- Pallimukku, is the last major junction and is part of Kochi CBD where the MG Road passes through. The Medical Trust Hospital at the Pallimukku is the major landmark.
