= Ravipuram =

- Ward
- Location in Kerala, India
- Coordinates: 9.956°N 76.292°E
- Country: India
- State: Kerala
- District: Ernakulam

Languages
  - Official: Malayalam, English
- Time zone: UTC+5:30 (IST)
- PIN: 6820**
- Telephone code: 0484
- Vehicle registration: KL-07
- Nearest city: Kochi
- Lok Sabha constituency: Ernakulam

Ravipuram (Malayalam pronunciation: [ɾəʋipʊɾəm]) is a ward in downtown Cochin. It sits adjacent to the Cochin Shipyard, close to the Cochin harbour. The neighbourhood is located along the portion of M.G. Road south of Sahodaran Ayyappan Road, and north of Perumanoor. It is bounded by Sahodaran Ayyappan Road to the north, the Ernakulam–Kayamkulam railway line to the east, and the now-defunct Cochin Harbour Terminus line to the south.

Originally a predominantly residential area with religious and cultural landmarks, Ravipuram underwent significant changes with the expansion of the Cochin Shipyard in the 1960s and 1970s. The development led to the displacement of several long-established communities, including the former neighborhood of Varavukad and its long-established Latin Catholic community. In the following decades, Ravipuram developed into a commercial and residential center, featuring modern infrastructure while retaining elements of its historical identity through religious institutions and older establishments.

Ravipuram is represented as Ward 61 in the Kochi Municipal Corporation.

== Toponymy ==
According to local tradition, the name Ravipuram is believed to have been conferred by the revered Krishna devotee, Vilwamangalam Swamiyar. During his visit to the Ravipuram Sree Krishna Temple, Swamiyar observed the rising sun's rays casting a divine glow to the deity's idol. Inspired by this phenomenon, he combined the words "Ravi" (Sanskrit for sun) and "Puram" (meaning town or locality), resulting in the name Ravipuram.

== History ==
Ravipuram was once home to the neighborhood of Varavukad, renowned for the Holy Cross Chapel (Varavukatt Kurishupally), a four-century-old church established by Portuguese missionaries. The church also served as a community centre and cultural institution for the predominantly Latin Catholic neighbourhood. In the early 1960s, the Indian government initiated land acquisition for the construction of Cochin Shipyard, leading to the displacement of residents and the demolition of the chapel and its adjoining cemetery. On January 16, 1972, the community held a final service at the chapel before relocating to Ambikapuram near Parambithara Road, where they established the Ambikapuram Our Lady of Sorrows Church. Today, only a wayside shrine near the shipyard wall at Ravipuram remains.

Atlantis Junction, located towards the boundary with Panampilly Nagar, was named after the former Hotel Atlantis. Originally known as Hotel Charmant during the colonial era, this establishment was renowned for hosting foreign guests. In the late 1960s, the hotel and surrounding properties were acquired to facilitate the construction of the Cochin Shipyard, leading to the demolition of the hotel by 1970. However, the junction between M.G. Road and Kizhavana road, and the railway crossing, both located around 60-70 metres from the former hotel, continue to be called Atlantis junction and Atlantis Railway Gate respectively.

== Demographics ==
According to the 2011 census, Ravipuram had a population of 8721, with 4271 males and 4450 females. 8.63% of residents were in the 0-6 age group. 8.43% of residents belonged to Scheduled Castes and 0.00% of residents belonged to Scheduled Tribes. The total literacy rate was 87.83%, with males having a literacy rate of 88.88% and females having a literacy rate of 86.83%

== Major institutions ==
- VFS Global Visa Application Centre in Cochin
- Fair Future Overseas Educational Consultancy
