= Ernakulam =

Central business district of the city of Kochi

- Downtown (CBD)
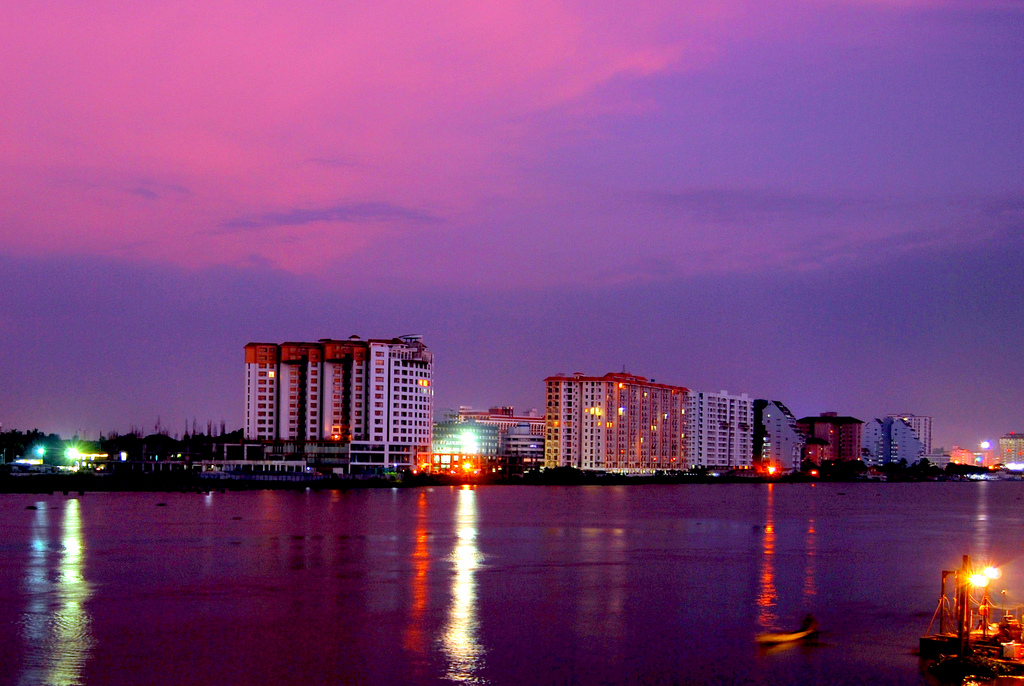
- Marine Drive

- Ernakulam (Kerala) Ernakulam (India)
- Coordinates: 9°58′53.8″N 76°17′59.6″E
- Country: India
- State: Kerala
- District: Ernakulam

Government
  - Body: Kochi Municipal Corporation
- Elevation: 22.36 m (73.4 ft)

Language
  - Official: Malayalam
- Time zone: UTC+5:30 (IST)
- Telephone code: +91484xxxxxxx
- Vehicle registration: KL-07
- Lok Sabha constituency: Ernakulam
- Website: www.ernakulam.nic.in

Ernakulam (Malayalam: [erɐɳɐːkuɭɐm]) is the central business district of the city of Kochi, Kerala, India. It is the namesake of Ernakulam district. The eastern part of Kochi city is mainly known as Ernakulam, while the western part of it after the Venduruthy Bridge is called as West Kochi. Several major institutions are located in Ernakulam, including the Kerala High Court, the headquarters of the Kochi Municipal Corporation, and Cochin Shipyard. The area is among the most urbanised parts of Kerala. The headquarters of the Southern Naval Command of the Indian Navy is situated at Willingdon Island adjacent to Ernakulam.

== Etymology ==
The name Ernakulam has several proposed derivations, some linked to mythology and others to local temples or geography. According to Komattil Achutha Menon, the word may have originated from *Erangiyal*, referring to a particular type of mud. In older Tamil literature, Shiva was sometimes referred to as *Erayanar*, meaning "the Lord" Another account suggests that the name evolved into Ernakulam over time. Alternative theories propose that it derived from *Rishinagakulam*, which later changed to Ernakulam, or that it is linked to the Eranakulathappan Temple. Some also attribute the name to the word *kulam* (pond), reflecting the presence of numerous water bodies in the area in earlier times.

== History ==
=== Classical history ===
The region played an important role in fostering trade relations between Kerala and the wider world during the ancient and medieval periods. The early political history of Ernakulam is closely linked with the Chera dynasty of the Sangam age, which ruled large parts of present-day Kerala and Tamil Nadu. After the decline of the Cheras, the area came under the control of the Kingdom of Cochin (Perumpadappu Swaroopam).

=== Princely State of Cochin ===
Although under British suzerainty (specifically the East India Company) since the Anglo-Dutch Treaty of 1814, Rama Varma XII of the Kingdom of Cochin moved his capital from Mattancherry to Tripunithura in about 1840. Fort Cochin Municipality was established in 1866 under the Madras Town Improvement Act of 1865, and municipal elections were first held in 1883. Ernakulam became a municipality in 1910. In the first state census of 1911, the population of Ernakulam was 21,901; 11,197 Hindus, 9,357 Christians, 935 Muslims, and 412 Jews.

== Geography ==
The Ernakulam District is situated in Central Kerala in India. Ernakulam is located at the geographic coordinates of 9°58′53.8″N 76°17′59.6″E and at an elevation of 22.36 m (73.4 ft) above the mean sea level.

=== Climate ===
Under the Köppen climate classification, the city of Ernakulam features a Tropical monsoon climate. Since the region lies in the south western coastal state of Kerala, the climate is tropical, with only minor differences in temperatures between day and night, as well as over the year. Summer lasts from March to May, and is followed by the South-west monsoon from June to September. October and November form the post monsoon or retreating monsoon season. Winter from December through February is slightly cooler, and windy, due to winds from the Western Ghats.

The city is drenched in the monsoonal season by heavy showers. The average annual rainfall is 3,000 mm (120 in). The South-west monsoon generally sets in during the last week of May. After July the rainfall decreases. On an average, there are 124 rainy days in a year. The maximum average temperature of the city in the summer season is 33 °C (91 °F) while the minimum temperature recorded is 22.5 °C (72.5 °F). The winter season records a maximum average of 29 °C (84 °F) and a minimum average of 20 °C (68 °F).

==== Climate data ====
Below is the climate data for Kochi Naval Base, which is situated nearby to Ernakulam.

Climate data for Kochi (Kochi Naval Base) 1981–2010, extremes 1951–2012
Month	Jan	Feb	Mar	Apr	May	Jun	Jul	Aug	Sep	Oct	Nov	Dec	Year
Record high °C (°F)	36.4 (97.5)	35.7 (96.3)	36.0 (96.8)	36.5 (97.7)	35.2 (95.4)	34.2 (93.6)	33.1 (91.6)	32.5 (90.5)	34.2 (93.6)	34.6 (94.3)	35.0 (95.0)	35.2 (95.4)	36.5 (97.7)
Mean daily maximum °C (°F)	31.9 (89.4)	32.0 (89.6)	32.6 (90.7)	33.0 (91.4)	32.4 (90.3)	30.3 (86.5)	29.6 (85.3)	29.5 (85.1)	30.2 (86.4)	30.7 (87.3)	31.3 (88.3)	31.9 (89.4)	31.3 (88.3)
Mean daily minimum °C (°F)	23.0 (73.4)	24.2 (75.6)	25.5 (77.9)	25.9 (78.6)	25.7 (78.3)	24.2 (75.6)	23.8 (74.8)	24.0 (75.2)	24.2 (75.6)	24.1 (75.4)	24.1 (75.4)	23.2 (73.8)	24.3 (75.7)
Record low °C (°F)	16.5 (61.7)	16.3 (61.3)	21.6 (70.9)	21.2 (70.2)	21.1 (70.0)	20.4 (68.7)	17.6 (63.7)	20.6 (69.1)	21.1 (70.0)	19.2 (66.6)	19.2 (66.6)	17.7 (63.9)	16.3 (61.3)
Average rainfall mm (inches)	24.3 (0.96)	27.1 (1.07)	45.0 (1.77)	113.1 (4.45)	284.5 (11.20)	700.3 (27.57)	575.5 (22.66)	378.8 (14.91)	310.3 (12.22)	366.6 (14.43)	150.4 (5.92)	39.0 (1.54)	3,014.8 (118.69)
Average rainy days	1.1	1.2	2.6	6.9	11.0	23.0	22.8	19.0	13.4	14.2	7.2	1.8	124.1
Average relative humidity (%) (at 17:30 IST)	61	65	68	70	73	82	83	82	79	77	72	64	73
Source: India Meteorological Department

== Economy ==
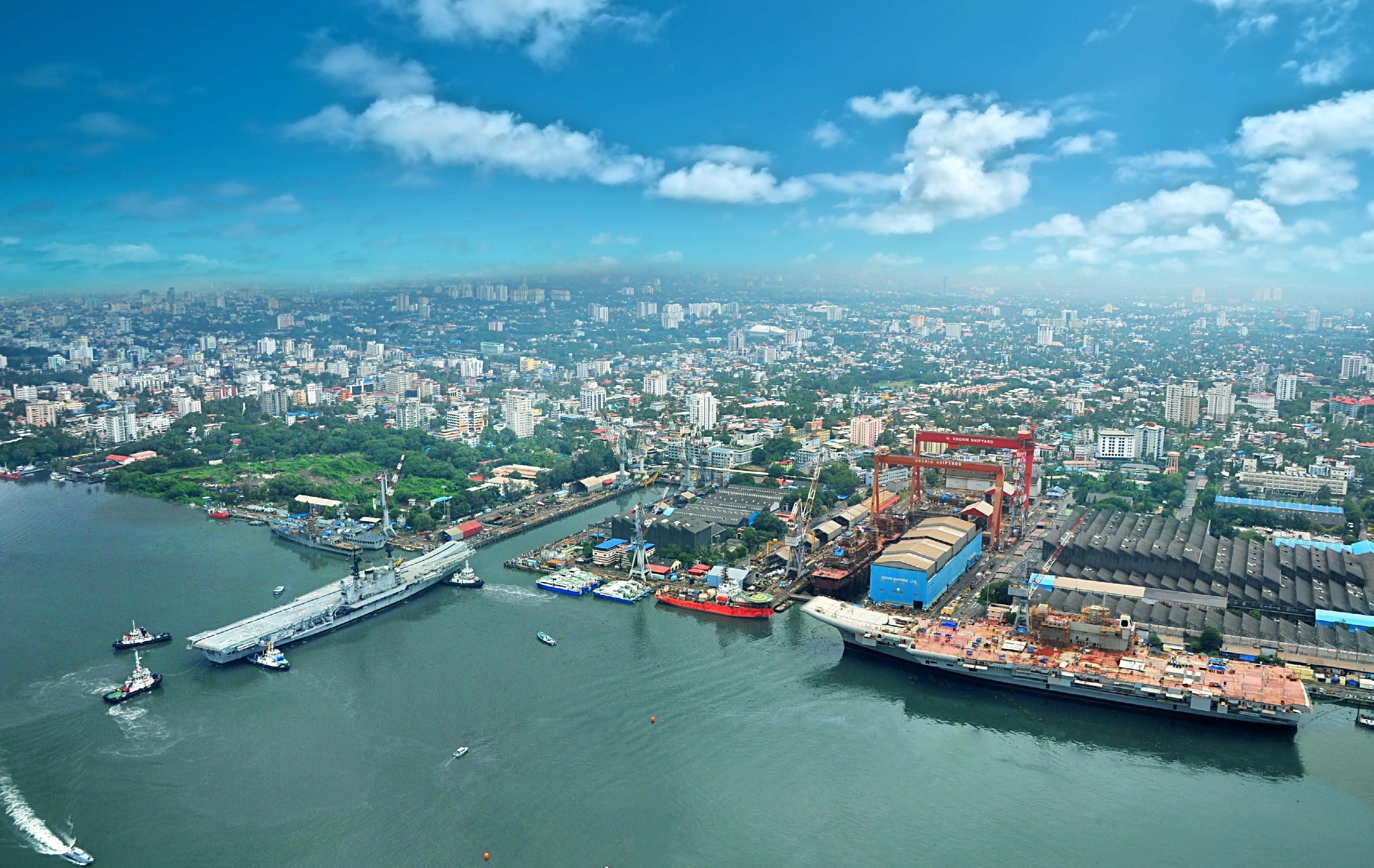
A view of Ernakulam side of Kochi

As of November 2012, Ernakulam was on target to become the first district in the nation of India to have 100% banking, ensuring that all families, except for voluntary exclusions, hold bank accounts.

Ernakulam, aka the CBD (Central Business District) of Kochi, has seen high urbanisation in the past few decades, thus turning it into an economic hub of the city. The first traces of this transformation were seen after the MG Road connecting Ravipuram and Kacherippady was opened in 1972. The development took a new shape after the Greater Cochin Development Authority (GCDA) built the Marine Drive to the West of MG Road, in the late 70s. Marine Drive and MG Road thus became the backbone of Kochi's economic activities, and acted as the base for the city to expand in all directions thereafter. Although the current bypass of Ernakulam is quickly becoming the new

== Transport ==
=== Road ===
Ernakulam is connected to the North–South Corridor of the National Highway network through the four-laned National Highway 66 and National Highway 544. The Main Central Road (MC Road), which begins in Thiruvananthapuram, terminates at Angamaly. These highways pass through the city and provide access to nearby centres such as Thrissur, Palakkad, Salem, and Coimbatore. Although NH 66 was originally intended to serve as a bypass for Kochi, rapid urban expansion has turned it into an urban arterial road, leading the National Highways Authority of India (NHAI) to propose a new bypass for the city.

The state-owned Kerala State Road Transport Corporation (KSRTC) operates inter-state, inter-district, and city bus services, primarily from the Ernakulam KSRTC bus stand, which is one of the busiest in Kochi after the Vytilla Mobility Hub. KSRTC also maintains two other facilities in the Ernakulam area of the city: the Ernakulam Jetty and the Thevara Depot.

=== Railway ===
Ernakulam Junction railway station is located close to the city's main shopping area on M. G. Road and is connected by the Kochi Metro. Rail services in the region are operated by the Southern Railway zone of Indian Railways.

Ernakulam Junction railway station is a major junction and the starting or terminating point for several passenger and express trains. It also serves as a key stop for trains travelling south towards Alappuzha. Both Ernakulam Junction and Ernakulam Town railway stations have been selected by the Ministry of Railways for upgradation to airport-standard facilities. Redevelopment work at Ernakulam Junction is currently in progress.

=== Air ===
Cochin International Airport is located approximately 27 km from Ernakulam. The earlier civilian airport of Kochi was situated closer to the city, on Willingdon Island. It is now known as INS Garuda and forms part of the headquarters of the Southern Naval Command.

=== Metro ===
The Ernakulam area is connected to other parts of Kochi by the Kochi Metro, which began operations in July 2017. Phase 1 of the project, estimated at ₹51.81 billion, covers a length of over 28 km from Aluva in the north to Tripunithura railway station in the southeast, passing through Ernakulam. As of the latest updates, 25.6 km of the line from Aluva to Pettah is operational, while the remaining 2.7 km section from Pettah to Tripunithura is under construction.

=== Water ===
Ernakulam has a number of jetties where passengers can embark and disembark from ferries. Ferry services connect with Willingdon Island, Mattancherry, Fort Kochi and Mulavukadu, at intervals of 20 minutes. Kochi Water Metro is an integrated water metro system serving the Greater Kochi region.

SWTD (Govt. of Kerala Department) offers cheap ferry service on the following routes:

Ferry services in the vicinity of Ernakulam
Source	Destination	Route via	Comments
Ernakulam	Fort Kochi		
Ernakulam	Fort Kochi	Embarkation (Willingdon Island)	
Ernakulam	Fort Kochi (Kamalakadavu Jetty)	Embarkation (Willingdon Island)	SuperFast with AC & non-AC seating
Ernakulam	Mattancherry	Fort Kochi, Terminals (Willingdon Island)	Services temporarily suspended between Terminals and Mattancherry
Ernakulam	Mattancherry	Embarkation (Willingdon Island), Fort Kochi, Terminals (Willingdon Island)	Services temporarily suspended between Terminals and Mattancherry
Ernakulam	Vypeen	Embarkation (Willingdon Island)	
Ernakulam	Vypeen	Embarkation (Willingdon Island), Fort Kochi	
Ernakulam	Varapuzha		
Ernakulam	High Court	Mulavukadu Panchayat	
Vytilla	Kakkanad (near Rajagiri Campus)		
Chittoor	Kadamakkudy		

== Media ==
=== Print ===
Major Malayalam newspapers published in Ernakulam include Malayala Manorama, Mathrubhumi, Janmabhoomi, Madhyamam, Deshabhimani, Deepika, Kerala Kaumudi, Metro Vartha, Siraj Daily, Varthamanam, Janayugom, Kochi Vartha and Veekshanam.

Popular English newspapers include Deccan Chronicle, The Times of India, The Hindu, and The New Indian Express. A number of evening papers are also published from the city.

Newspapers in other regional languages like Hindi, Kannada, Tamil and Telugu are also sold in large numbers.

Being the seat of the Cochin Stock Exchange, a number of financial publications are also published in the city. These include The Economic Times, Business Line, Business Standard and The Financial Express.

Prominent magazines and religious publications like the Sathyadeepam and The Week are also published.

== Broadcasting ==
=== Television ===
Television stations in Ernakulam include Asianet, Asianet Plus, Asianet News, Zee Keralam, Surya TV, Surya Movies, Surya Music, Surya Comedy Channel, Amrita TV, Media One, Twentyfour News, Jeevan TV, Manorama News, Mathrubhumi News, Janam TV, WE TV, Flowers TV and Reporter TV. DTH services are available through DD Free Dish, Airtel digital TV, Dish TV, Sun Direct, and Tata Sky. The cable operators in Ernakulam are Asianet Digital TV, Siti Cable, Kerala Vision, DEN Networks. The local channels are Asianet Cable Vision, Ernakulam cable TV and Den mtn.

=== Radio ===
All India Radio has two FM stations in the city, operating at 102.3 MHz AIR Kochi FM and 107.5 MHz. AIR Rainbow FM Private FM radio stations are Radio Mango 91.9, Red FM 93.5, 94.3 Club FM and 104.0 Radio Mirchi. These operate 24 hours a day 7 days a week.

== Education ==
- Universities – Cochin University of Science and Technology, National University of Advanced Legal Studies, Kerala University of Fisheries and Ocean Studies, Sree Sankaracharya University of Sanskrit
- Colleges – Maharajas College, St. Teresa's College, St. Albert's College, Sacred Heart College, Thevara, Cochin University of Science and Technology, St. Paul's College, Kalamassery, Rajagiri College of Social Sciences, Bharata Mata College, School of Engineering, CUSAT, KMEA Engineering College, Government Medical College, Ernakulam, Government Model Engineering College, De paul institute of Science and Technology, Government Law College, Ernakulam, Union Christian College, Aluva, Viswajyothi College of Engineering and Technology, Muthoot Institute of Technology and Science, Puthencruz, Jai Bharath Engineering Collage, Perumbavoor Federal Institute of Science, Angamaly, SCMS School of Engineering and Technology, National University of Advanced Legal Studies

== Notable people ==
- Varghese Payyappilly (also known as Payyappilly Varghese Kathanar), a Syro-Malabar Catholic priest and the founder of the Congregation of the Sisters of the Destitute (S.D.), was born in Perumanur near Thevara in Ernakulam. He was declared Venerable by Pope Francis in 2018.
- G. N. Ramachandran (Gopalasamudram Narayanan Ramachandran, FRS; 1922–2001), a physicist known for developing the Ramachandran plot used in the study of peptide and protein structure, was born in Ernakulam.

== Politics ==
Ernakulam assembly constituency is part of Ernakulam (Lok Sabha constituency).

== See also ==
- Ravipuram
- Aluva
- Angamaly
- Ernakulam district
- Kochi
- Kochukadavanthra
- Places of worship in Ernakulam
