= Kadavanthra =

- Ward
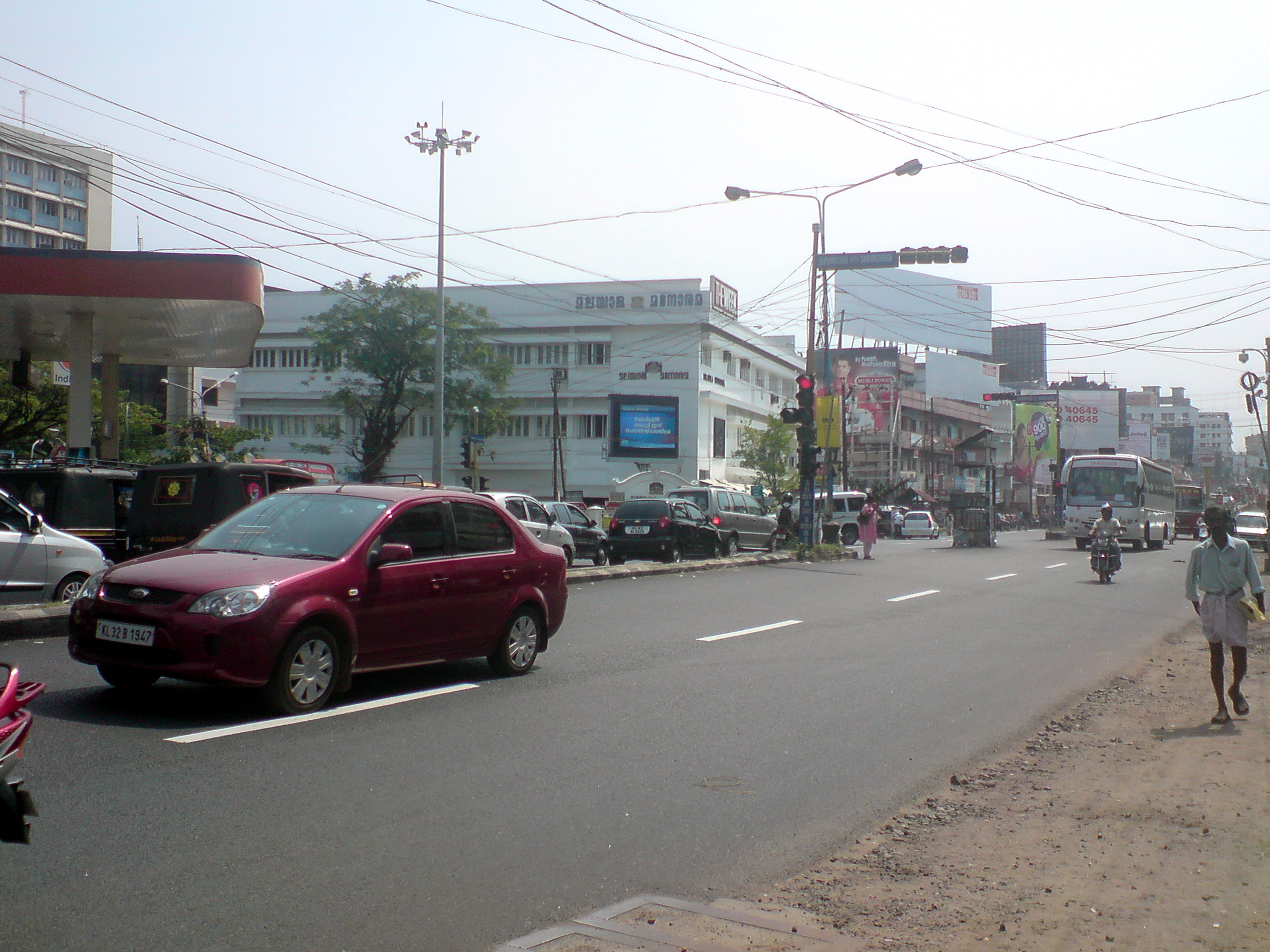
- Manorama Junction in 2011

- Location in Kerala, India
- Coordinates: 9°58′0″N 76°18′0″E
- Country: India
- State: Kerala
- District: Ernakulam

Population (2011)
  - Total: 5,522

Languages
  - Official: Malayalam, English
- Time zone: UTC+5:30 (IST)
- PIN: 682020
- Vehicle registration: KL-07

Kadavanthra is a major commercial and residential neighbourhood in the city of Kochi in Kerala, India. It is bounded by the S.A Road to the east (MG Road-side) and the Giri Nagar canal in the west. It is served by major roads including S.A. Road and Kaloor–Kadavanthra Road. S.A. Road connects Kadavanthra with Vyttila and the areas around Mahatma Gandhi Road, while Kaloor–Kadavanthra Road provides a connection to Kaloor. The neighbourhood is also located near Chilavannur Lake.

The S.A Road and Kaloor-Kadavanthra Road are the Kadavanthra's main arterial roads. Kaloor-Kadavanthra arterial road connects Kaloor at the North and Kadavanthra downtown at South. Kadavanthra is close to the Chilavannur Lake, which lies to its east, and the Ponneth Bhagavathy Temple.

== Surroundings ==
Kadavanthra Junction is a major intersection in Kochi, one of the busiest in the city. The junction facilitates Kadavanthra Metro Station, catering to passengers for Panampilly Nagar/Kadavanthra area.

The junction is an intersection of Kochi City's main arterial Sahodaran Ayyappan Road (east-west) with arterial Kaloor-Kadavanthra Road (north-south) and K.P.Vallon Road (north-south). This junction enhances rail connectivity from M.G Road to Vytilla Mobility Hub.

Kadavanthra is part of Kochi's central business district located in central Kochi area. It is notable as home for the headquarters of the Greater Cochin Development Authority, the statutory body overseeing the development of the city of Kochi. NIA (National Investigation Agency) is also located in Kadavanthra. The Kochi Metro Kadavanthra station is situated in front of GCDA lawns. Kendriya Vidyalaya (KV), Soften Technologies, Bhavans Vidya Mandir and St Josephs Upper Primary School are located in this area. Housing colonies include Panampilly Nagar, Giri Nagar, Gandhi Nagar and Jawahar Nagar.

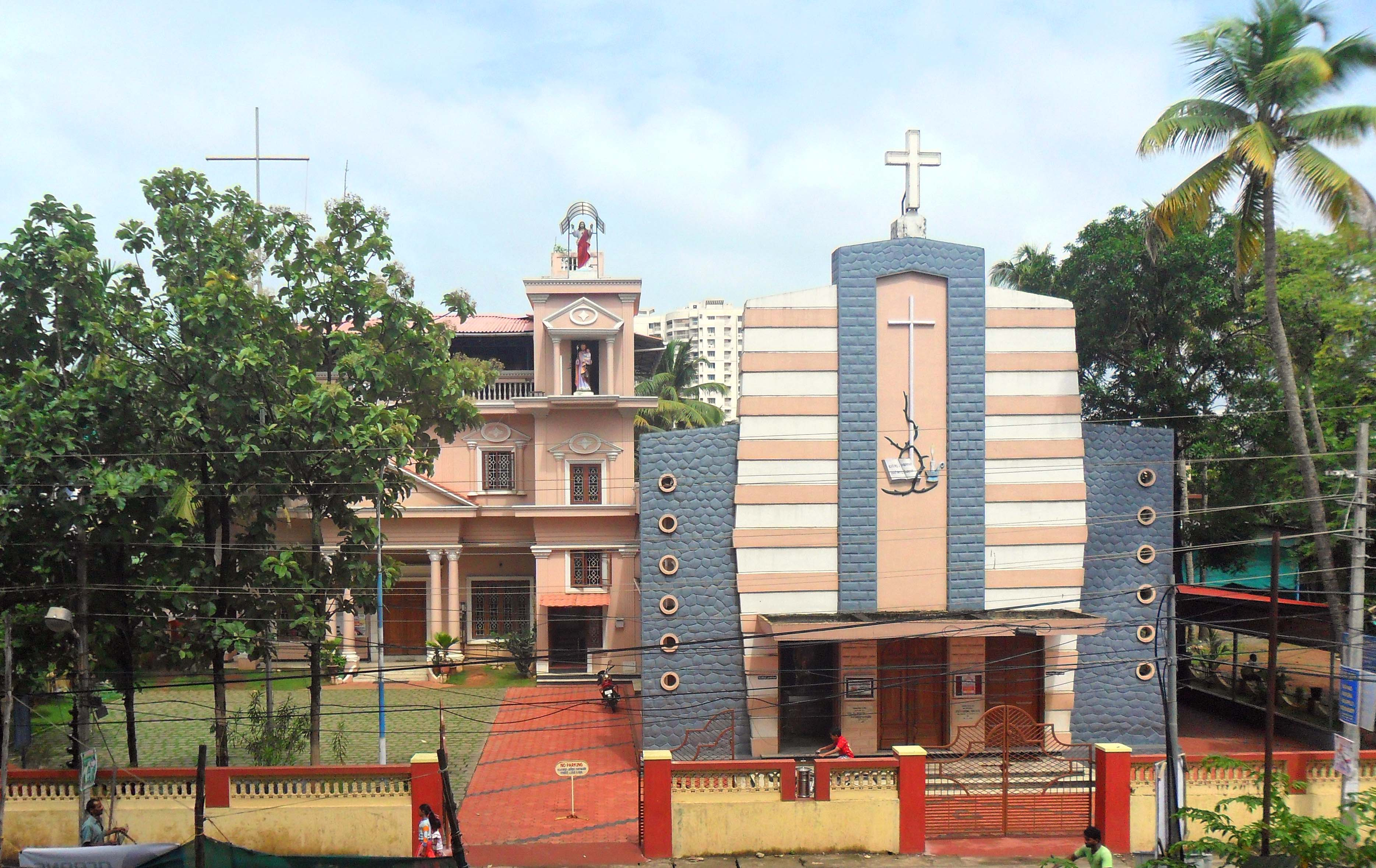
St.Joseph's Miraculous Shrine Syrian Catholic Church

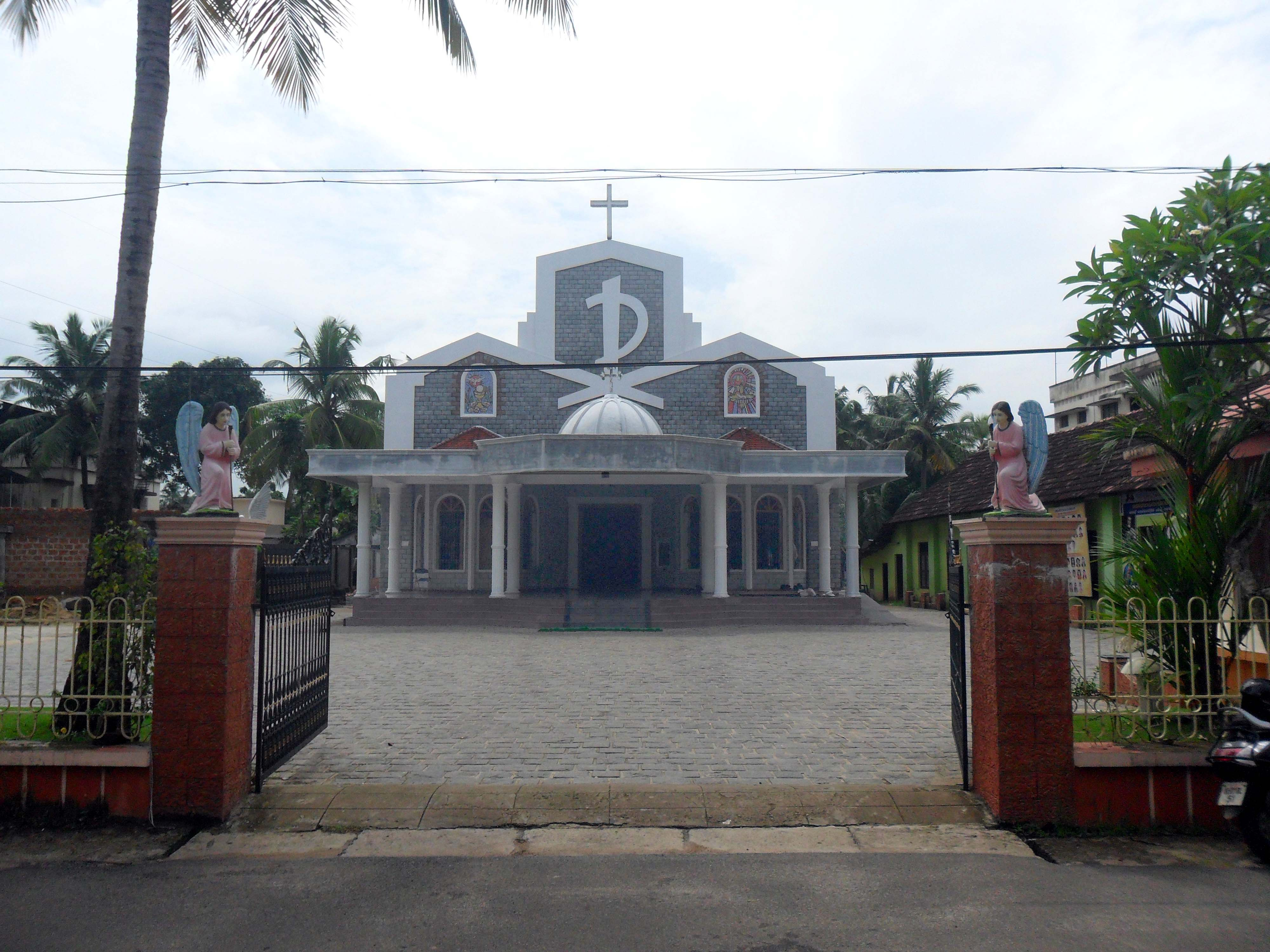
St.Sebastian's Latin Catholic Church

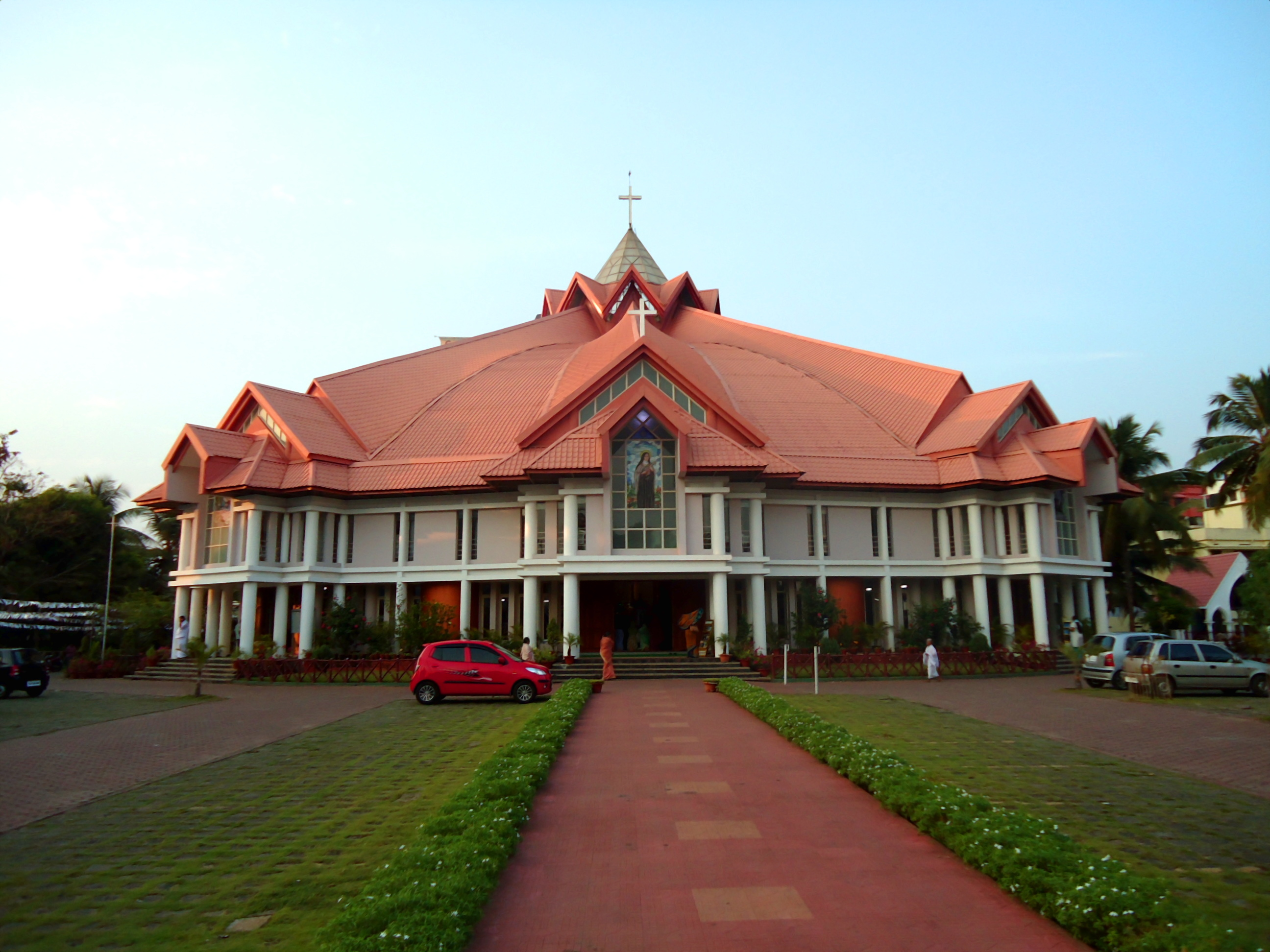
Little Flower Church Kadavanthra

It is close to the South Railway Station, with access to Kaloor, Vyttila. Kaloor-Kadavanthra Road links northern and southern parts of Kochi. Kadavanthra became a major hub following the completion of Kaloor-Kadavanthra Road.

The St. Joseph's Shrine Kadavanthra

St. Joseph's Shrine Church, Kadavanthra is a Catholic parish church located in Kadavanthra, Kochi, Kerala, India. The church was established and consecrated on 24 December 1972. Dedicated to Saint Joseph, it serves as an important spiritual centre for the faithful and is widely regarded as a prominent shrine of St. Joseph in Kochi. The annual feast of St. Joseph is celebrated grandly from 20 April to 1 May each year. On 30 April, the statue of St. Joseph is ceremoniously taken from the chapel and placed in front of the church under a floral-decorated pandal for public veneration. The celebrations culminate on 1 May with the annual town procession, in which a large crowd participates.

In addition, the Nercha Sadhya (devotional feast) in honour of St. Joseph is observed annually on 19 March, drawing many faithful and visitors to the shrine.

== Facilities ==
Major centres in and around Kadavanthra include:

- Kadavanthra metro station.
- Enforcement Directorate, Kochi Office
- St Joseph's Shrine Church Kadavanthra
- The Regional Sports Centre (RSC) Rajiv Gandhi International Indoor Stadium
- The Greater Cochin Development Authority (GCDA)
- Statue of Sahodaran Ayyappan in the S.A Road.
- National Investigation Agency.
- Office of Kerala State Electricity Board (KSEB)
- Office of the Housing Development Authority in Panampilly Nagar
- The Kadavanthra Post Office on Cheruparambath Road
- The Passport office in Panampilly Nagar
- Panampilly Nagar has a separate post office
- Supplyco of the Civil Supplies Department, Government of Kerala in Gandhinagar
- Kadavanthra Janamytri Police Station
- Fire Station
- BSNL office
- Indra Gandhi Co-operative Hospital
- Akshaya Hospital
- Giridhar Hospital
- Lotus Eye Hospital
- Kendriya Vidyalaya (Central School)
- Office of Health Inspector
- Elamkulam village office
- The Vijaya Hospital
- Central Bank of India in Kallelil Building.

== Location ==
Located near Ernakulam Jn Railway Station.
