= Greater Cochin Development Authority =

Statutory body overseeing Kochi city

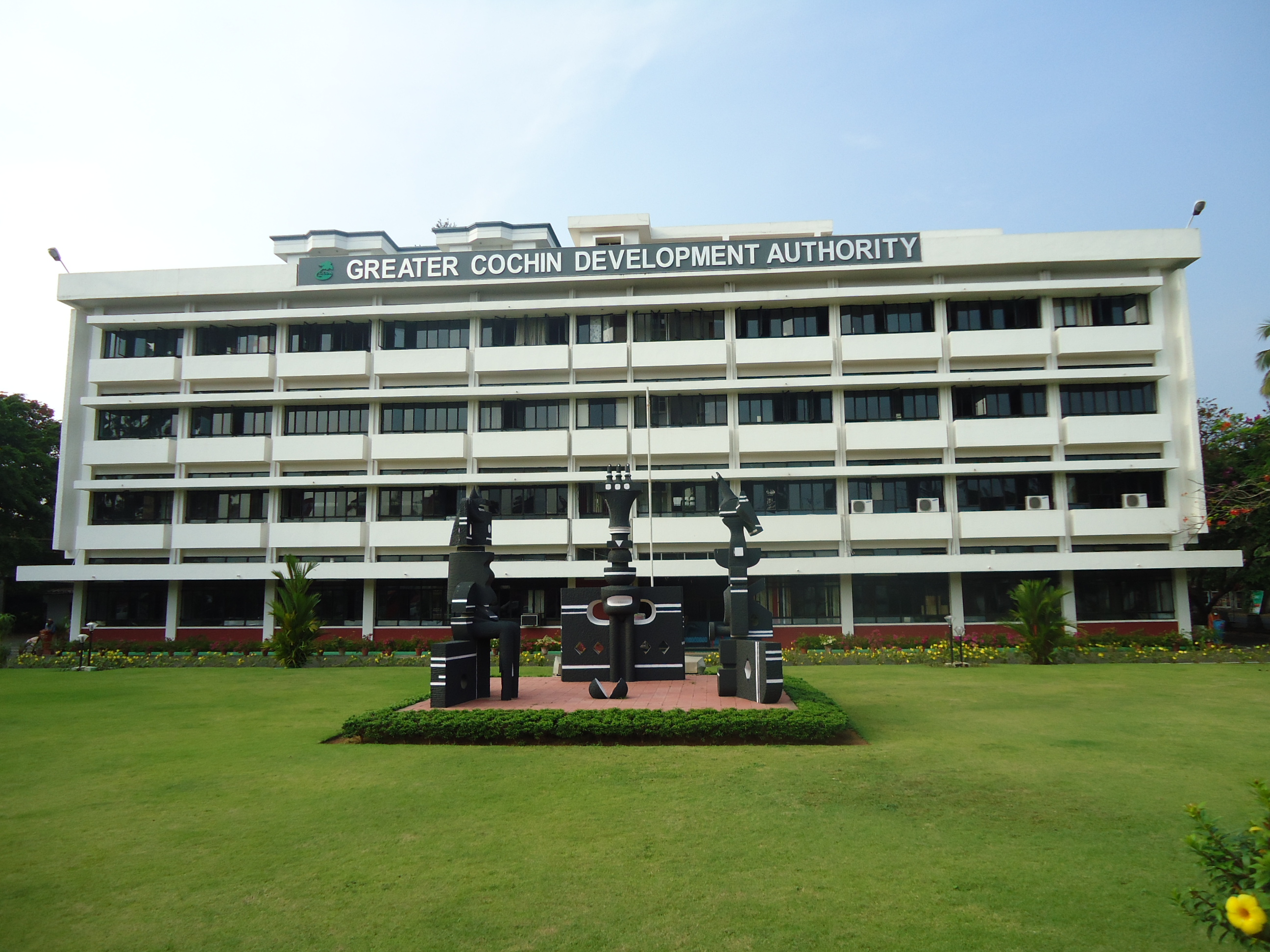
- GCDA headquarters at Kadavanthra
- Type: Development corporation
- Founded: 1976; 50 years ago
- Headquarters: Kadavanthra, Kochi, Kerala, India
- Area served: Kochi, Kerala
- Key people: K. Chandran Pillai (Chairman)
- Website: www.gcda.kerala.gov.in

Greater Cochin Development Authority (GCDA) is a statutory body headquartered in Kadavanthra, Kerala, India, established in 1976. It is responsible for the development planning of the Kochi Municipal Corporation (except two wards), nine adjacent municipal councils, and 21 intervening gram panchayats, covering a total area of 632 km^{2}.

The GCDA is one of the two development bodies in Kochi, the other being Goshree Islands Development Authority which oversees development planning of eight island panchayats, covering an area of 100 km^{2}.

== Jurisdiction ==
- Kochi Municipal Corporation (except the wards of Fort Vypeen and Thanthonnithuruthu, and Gundu Island)
- Municipal councils: Thrippunithura, Thrikkakara, Aluva, Kalamassery, Maradu, Eloor, North Paravur, Angamaly and Perumbavoor.
- Gram panchayats: Alengad, Chellanam, Chennamangalam, Chengamanad, Cheranelloor, Chottanikkara, Choornikkara, Edathala, Ezhikkara, Kumbalangi, Kadamakkudy, Kadungalloor, Kumbalam, Kottuvally, Mulanthuruthi, Nedumbassery, Udayamperoorm, Vadavucode-Puthencruz, Vazhakulam, and Varappuzha.

== Projects ==
=== Kochi Marine Drive ===
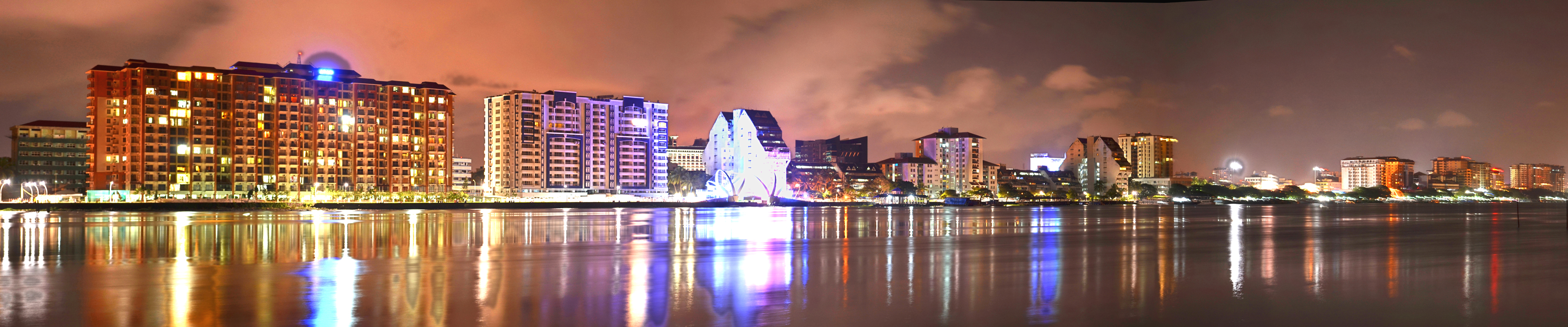
The beauty in the night, Marine Drive, Kochi

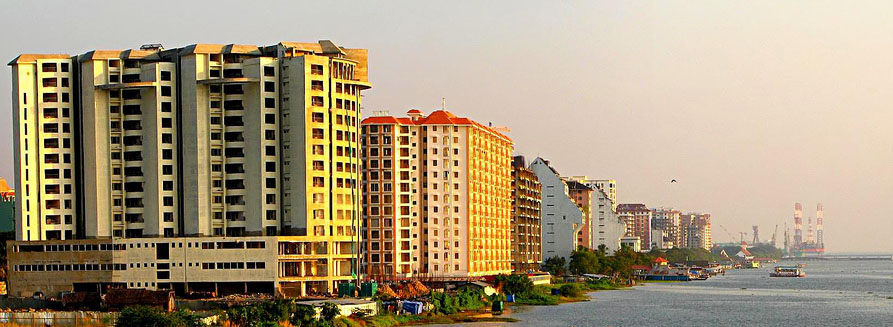
The Marine Drive

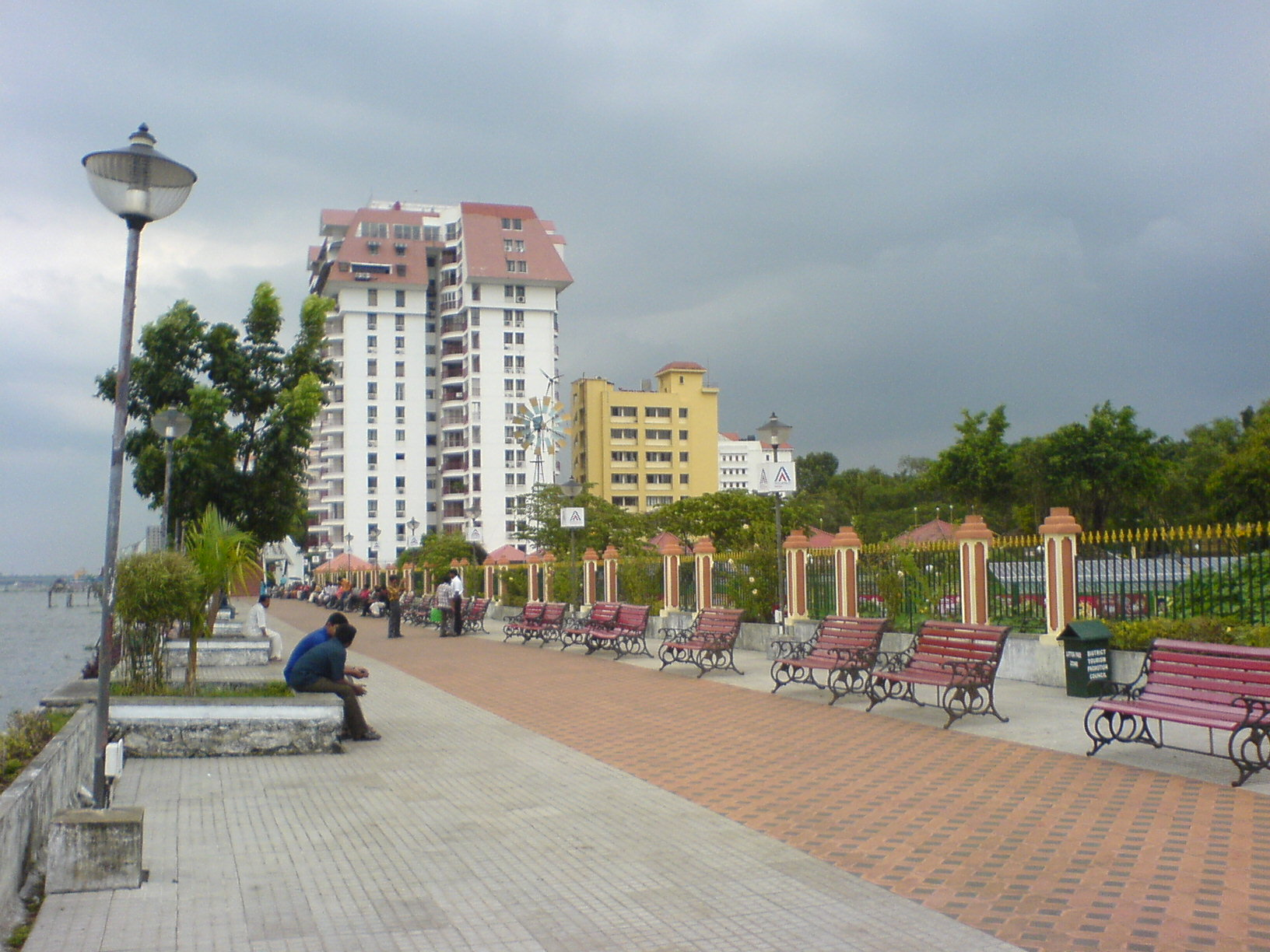
Marine Walkway

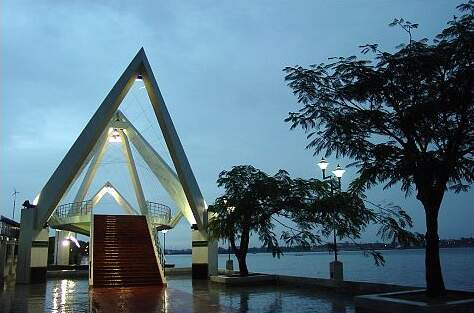
The China-Net bridge

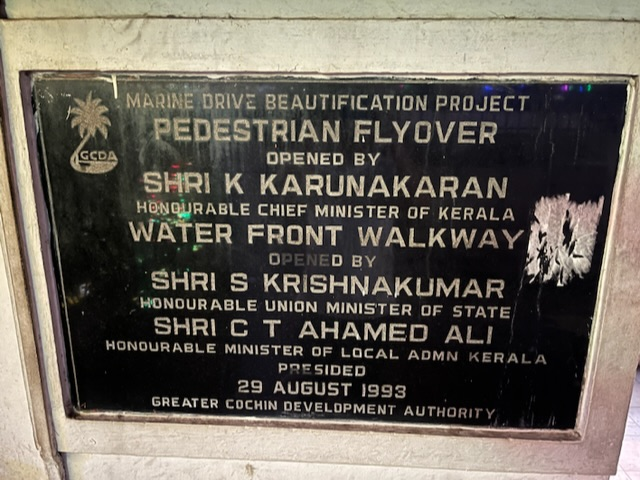
Inauguration of GCDA Kochi Marine Drive beautification project

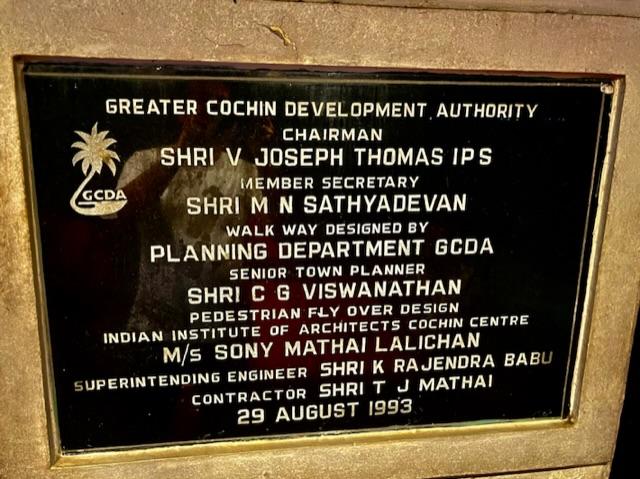
GCDA Kochi Marine Drive beautification project

The Marine Drive is one of the most significant projects that GCDA has ever undertaken. The whole of the present Kochi Marine Drive (part of the Kochi Lake, west of the Shanmugham Road to the present Walkway) was claimed from the Kochi Lake in the 1980s. This land underwent several beautification initiatives, especially with the construction of the iconic Rainbow Bridge in 1992. This land later became home for a line of high-rises namely, the GateWay Residency Hotel, the Bay Pride Mall, Kerala Trade Centre etc. A common code for construction is enforced in this stretch of land which includes that the building could be of a maximum 13 storeys, the eastern and western boundaries of the buildings should coincide etc. The sub projects of the Kochi Marine Drive include:

  - The Marine Walkway stretching from Subhas Chandra Bose Park in the south, to KSINC Boat Jetty in the north.
  - The Rainbow Bridge which is part of the Marine Walkway
  - The China Net Bridge which is part of the Marine Walkway
  - GCDA Shopping Complex in Marine Drive.
  - The Asoka-Tharangini Apartments

=== Jawaharlal Nehru International Stadium ===
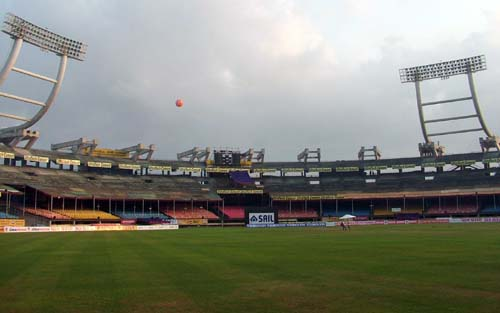
Jawaharlal Nehru Stadium

The largest stadium in Kerala with a seating capacity of 75000, and costed ₹ 75 Crore. This is one of the largest projects of the GCDA that was completed ahead of time and well within the budget. The stadium was constructed in 515 days under the leadership of V.J.Thomas IPS, Ex-Chairman, Greater Cochin Development Authority.

=== Other projects ===
- Maharaja's College Ground
- Rajendra maidan near Subhas Chandra Bose Park.
- Eastern Terminal of the Ernakulam Junction Railway Station
- Ambedkar Stadium near K.S.R.T.C bus station.
- Panampilly Nagar. The first ever planned urban housing colony in Kerala.
- Gandhi Nagar. Another planned housing colony developed by GCDA.
- Kaloor-Kadavanthra Road (KK Road) connecting Kadavanthra and Kaloor.
- Subhas Chandra Bose Road
- Changampuzha Park, the cultural centre in memory of late poet Sri. Changampuzha, at Edappally.

=== Infrastructure ===
The first B.O.T. project in Kerala, the Mattancherry Bridge was coordinated by GCDA. In addition, Kathrikadavu Railway Overbridge and Chilavannur Bund road bridge in Chilavannur puzha have been constructed by GCDA.

In road transport sector, apart from the roads developed as part of area development schemes, in Panampilly Nagar, Gandhi Nagar, Aluva, Rameswaram, and Parur, G.C.D.A has recently completed the 3.2-km long and 22-m wide Kaloor-Kadavanthra road, 15-m wide Subhash Chandra Bose Road, Chilavannur Bund Road (partially completed) and K.P. Vallon Road widening first phase, Panampilly Nagar Anamthuruthy road (partially completed) were taken up by G.C.D.A. Land has been made available to the corporation for the construction of 2-km long & 22-m wide Stadium Link Road, by GCDA by negotiation with the land owners. G.C.D.A. had taken a major role in the implementation of the 22-meter wide & 3 km long Sahodaran Ayyappan Road by getting land surrendered free of cost with the cooperation of Kochi Corporation.

Widening of Kaloor Palarivattom Road was taken up by State P.W.D. with the co-operation of GCDA in getting the land surrendered free of cost for road widening.

To decongest the south Railway Overbridge and to reduce traffic on M.G. Road and Chittoor road the eastern entry to the South Railway station was developed by GCDA. Greater Cochin Development Authority has thus developed a total of about 75 km. of road length of varying widths ranging from 7m to 36m with in the Greater Cochin Region.

=== Housing sector ===
- Constructed about 5000 Nos. of dwelling units for different income group within the Greater Cochin Region.
- Housing Loan given to about 15000 families scattered all over the Region.
- 700 Houses constructed and allotted to low income families for rehabilitation.
- 1700 Nos. of residential plots developed and sold to individuals.135 Acres of land given to different Government / quasi-Government agencies for group housing.

GCDA have developed many planned housing colonies such as Panampilly Nagar, Gandhi Nagar, Kasthurba Nagar, Shastri Nagar, Indira Nagar and Subash Nagar

== See also ==
- Kochi
- Corporation of Cochin
- Kingdom of Cochin
