= Kaloor-Kadavanthra Road =

Major arterial road of Kochi, India

Route information
- Length: 3.2 km (2.0 mi)

Major junctions
- Kadavanthra; Kaloor

Location
- Country: India
- State: Kerala

Highway system
- Roads in India; Expressways; National; State; Asian; State Highways in Kerala

Kaloor-Kadavanthra Road is an arterial road of Kochi City. Also known as KK Road, it is one of the three north-south arteries in the city of Kochi. It starts at the Kadavanthra Junction and ends at Kaloor,both are the two major junctions in the city of Kochi. Kaloor-Kadavanthra Road intersects the S.A Road from Vytilla (East) to Pallimukku Junction (West) at Kadavanthra Junction. The South extension of the Kaloor-Kadavanthra Road is the KP Vallon Road. Most of the long distance buses that connect the city to the regions of the south and southeast use this road to reach their main terminal at Kaloor. This 3.2 km long, 22 m wide, 4-lane city highway was planned to ease the load on the busy MG Road. The city is divided into two parts by the railway line running in a north-south direction. This road fills the need for an artery on the eastern sector, avoiding the choke points of the two railway overpasses. The road also has multiple banks along its route, such as the State Bank of India at Grand Bay, ICICI, Bank of India, HDFC, Central Bank of India among the others. The condition of the Kaloor-Kadavanthra Road has increased over time.
