= Elamkulam, Kochi =

Elamkulam
- Ward
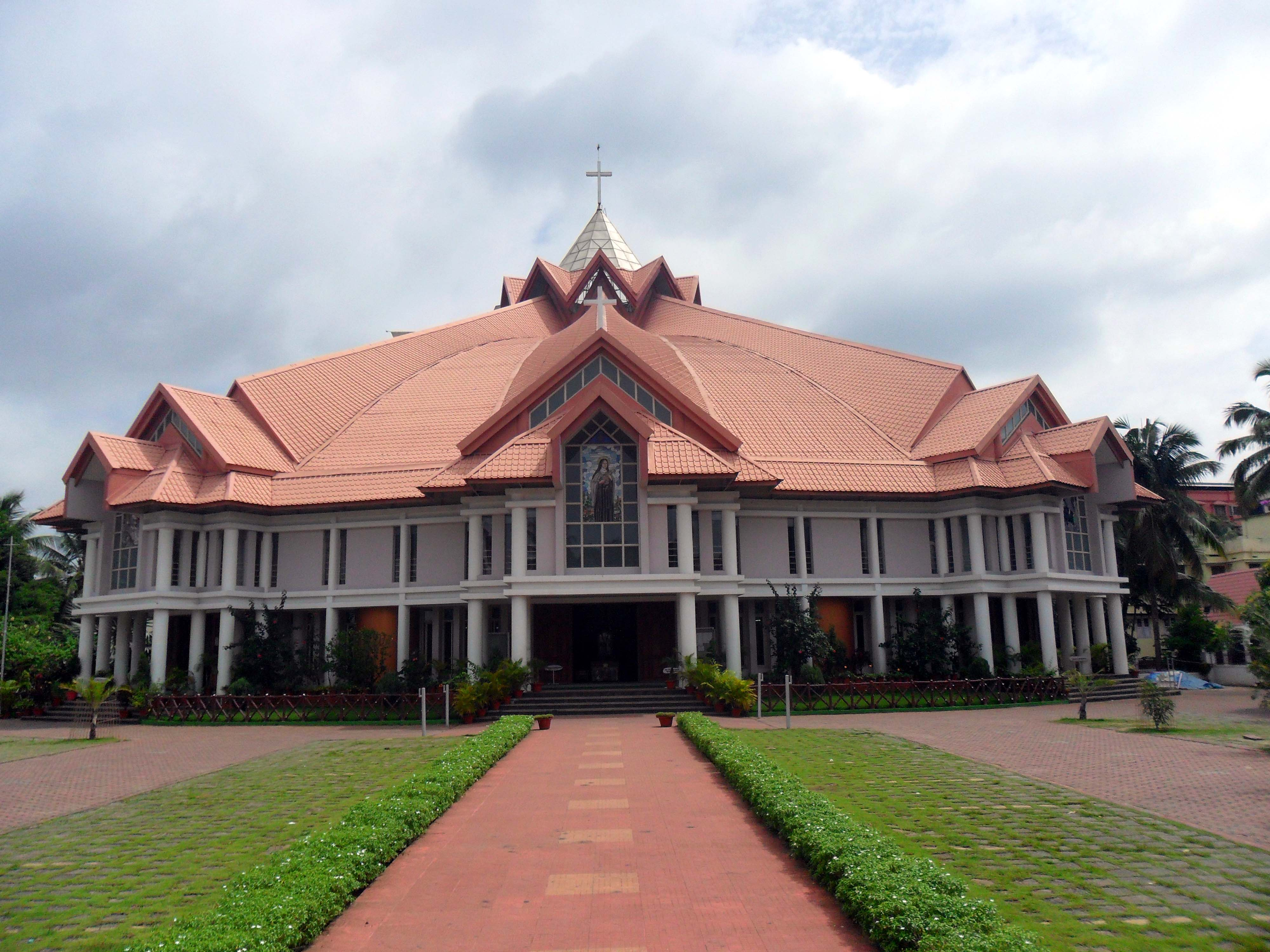
- Little Flower Church
- Interactive map of Elamkulam
- Coordinates: 9°58′0″N 76°18′0″E
- Country: India
- State: Kerala
- District: Ernakulam

Languages
  - Official: Malayalam, English
- Time zone: UTC+5:30 (IST)
- PIN: Kadavanthra-682020
- Telephone code: 0484
- Vehicle registration: KL-07
- Coastline: 0 kilometres (0 mi)
- Nearest city: ERNAKULAM
- Climate: Tropical monsoon (Köppen)
- Avg. summer temperature: 35 °C (95 °F)
- Avg. winter temperature: 20 °C (68 °F)

Elamkulam is a ward of Kochi, Kerala. Elamkulam is a part of the Kadavanthra pincode and Kadavanthra Janamythri Police station. Elamkulam is well facilitated with Metro railway station which works as an extension counter to Kadavanthra metro station to cater to passengers who want to shop at branded outlets like MAX, Trends etc. Elamkulam metro station also privileges direct entry to Radisson Blu Kochi.

== Location ==
The buildings and offices in Kadavanthra expanded to the spaces of this place which is next bus stop after Kadavanthra towards Vyttila direction. Elamkulam boasts several small and large churches, the biggest of which is the Little Flower Church located at the Sahodaran Ayyapan Road (S.A. Road). The road to the north from the Elamkulam bus stop leads to Sewage Treatment Plant. The road is hence named S.T.P. road and it is also known as the Fatima Church road. The road towards south is the Chilavanoor road.

== Landmarks ==
The S.T.P. road leads to Chettichira junction in Subhash Chandra Bose road. It was the old way to get to Kadavanthra before the Kaloor-Kadavanthra Road came to existence and its full functionality. The Elamkulam junction also houses the Navy quarters and leads to the backwaters of Chilavanoor where many flats are on the rise. Elamkulam comes under the Kadavanthra P.O. The Elamkulam Village office is located opposite to the Rajiv Gandhi Indoor Stadium known previously as Regional Sports Centre, Kochi at Kadavanthra. The Elamkulam village office where the land taxes and residential issues and taxes are collected is one of the three Village offices in the Cochin Corporation. Elamkulam region expands from the bridge over the erstwhile Thripunithura lagoon, which is at present just a canal, to the Elamkulam junction. Alingal residence association is situated here.

== Colonies ==
Many residential colonies under the Elamkulam region include:

- Kumaranasan nagar
- Vrindavanam Colony
- Nethaji Nagar
- Jawahar Nagar
- Giri Nagar
- Bose Nagar
- Vinobha Nagar
- Tagore Nagar

== Places of worship ==
Elamkulam has Hindu temples such as:

- The Elamkulam Bhagavathy Temple in Kaloor-Kadavanthra Road aka Kavalakkal
- Devi Te
- Alingal sreedurga devi temple
- Narasimhamurty Temple
- Ponnothukaavu Bhagavathy Temple in Chilavannoor Road

Elamkulam has Christian Churches such as:

- Fatima Church (first church in Elamkulam)
- Little Flower Church in Sahodaran Ayyappan Road
- St Mary's Soonoro Patriarchal Cathedral
- Jerusalem Mar Thoma Church
- St. Gregorios Orthodox Chapel
- Emmanuel Baptist Church
- CSI Christ Church
- New Life Fellowship( Malayalam, Hindi, Odiya, English, Tamil)

== Facilities at the junction ==
- Petrol Pump HPCL
- Airtel Showroom
- SBI ATM
