= Kochukadavanthra =

- Locality
- Location in Kerala, India Kochukadavanthra (India)
- Coordinates: 9°56′54″N 76°17′53″E
- Country: India
- State: Kerala
- District: Ernakulam

Government
  - Body: Kochi Municipal Corporation

Languages
  - Official: Malayalam, English
- Time zone: UTC+5:30 (IST)
- Postal code: 682020
- Vehicle registration: KL-07

Kochukadavanthra is a small area of Elamkulam village in the city of Kochi, situated on the west bank of the Perandoor Canal. It is of close proximity to Kadavanthra, Chilavannoor & Vyttila.

== Educational institutions nearby ==
- Traum Academy for German & French languages
