= Medical Trust Hospital =

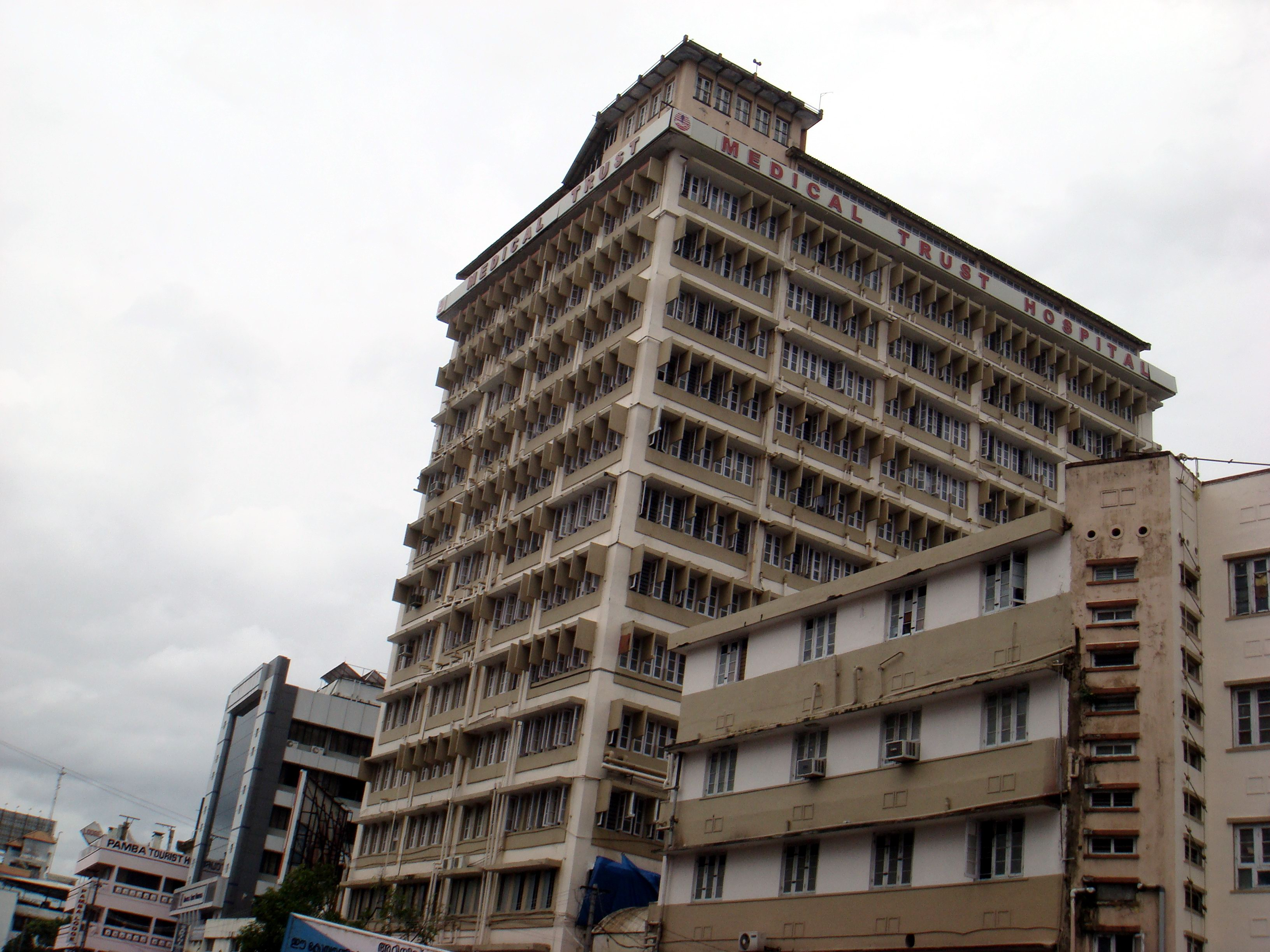

Geography
- Location: MG Road, Kochi - 682016, India

Organisation
- Care system: Tertiary
- Type: acute-cum-critical care referral hospital

Services
- Emergency department: Yes
- Beds: 750

History
- Founded: 1973

Links
- Website: medicaltrusthospital.com
- Lists: Hospitals in India

Medical Trust Hospital is a "super speciality" hospital located at Kochi in Kerala, India. In the year 1980 and was the first otolaryngology department to provide microsurgeries of the ear and the larynx for free to the people of Kerala.
