= Karanakodam =

Region in Kochi, Kerala, India

- Suburb

Languages
  - Official: Malayalam, English
- Time zone: UTC+5:30 (IST)

Karanakodam is a region in the city of Kochi, in the state of Kerala, India. This is a predominantly residential zone with facilities like grocery stores, schools, medical clinics, libraries, temples, churches and mosques.
