= Mahatma Gandhi Road (Kochi) =

Major artery street in Kochi, India

Route information
- Length: 4.5 km (2.8 mi)

Major junctions
- Banerji Road; S.A Road

Location
- Country: India
- State: Kerala

Highway system
- Roads in India; Expressways; National; State; Asian; State Highways in Kerala

Mahatma Gandhi Road, popularly known as M. G. Road, is the main artery as well as the commercial high street of the city of Kochi, in the state of Kerala, India. The road lies north-south with its boundaries at the Venduruthy bridge, Thevara in the south, and the Madhava Pharmacy Junction in the north, where it intersects the Banerji Road. The road was earlier part of the NH 47A (Old Highway) and was later handed over to Kochi Municipal Corporation. The highway was earlier known as Seventy Feet road. The total distance of the road is 4.5 kilometres (2.8 mi).

M. G. Road is considered as the lifestyle district of the city of Kochi. Along the road exists several famous retail stores, hospitals, banks, leading hotels, malls and multiplexes. Also Cochin Naval Base civilian workers union office located in this road. The Cochin Shipyard and Shenoys Theatre are also located in MG Road. M.G.Road along with S.A.Road, another main arterial road, have the metro rail connectivity towards Ernakulam Junction railway station and Kadavanthra to reach Vytilla Hub, a major transport hub of Kerala.

== History ==
During days of British Raj, the present Kochi city was part of their princely states of British India. The oldest arterial road of the city was Chittoor Road built by Kochi Rajas connecting South Railway Station to Chittoor Temple at chittoor. This road does not connect to southern side of the city, particularly to Fort Kochi, the British quarter of Kochi. The British Resident felt need of another major road that connects to south. In the year 1920, Sir Robert Bristow - the Chief Engineer who conceived the new port of Kochi, announced his plans to create a new island from sea between Ernakulam Mainland and Fort Kochi island and transfer the existing port to the new island. He visioned the urgent need of new road connecting mainland and new port island for transferring materials and in future cargo requirements.

in 1923 plans for new road was finalized and work was started with Consort Queen Parukutty Nethyar Amma providing land for the same. The new road was seventy feet in width and hence named as Seventy Feet road and opened to public in 1925. The road connected to newly formed port island- Willingdon through a bridge and merged with Chitoor Road near Kacheripady where the Central City offices of Kochi Kingdom were located.

Since then this road played an important role in the history of modern Kochi which several landmarks located this stretch. Today its one of the most important commercial road of the city and one of the most congested roads in the state.

In year 1972, the road was renamed as Mahatma Gandhi Road, in honour of father of the nation.

== Junctions ==
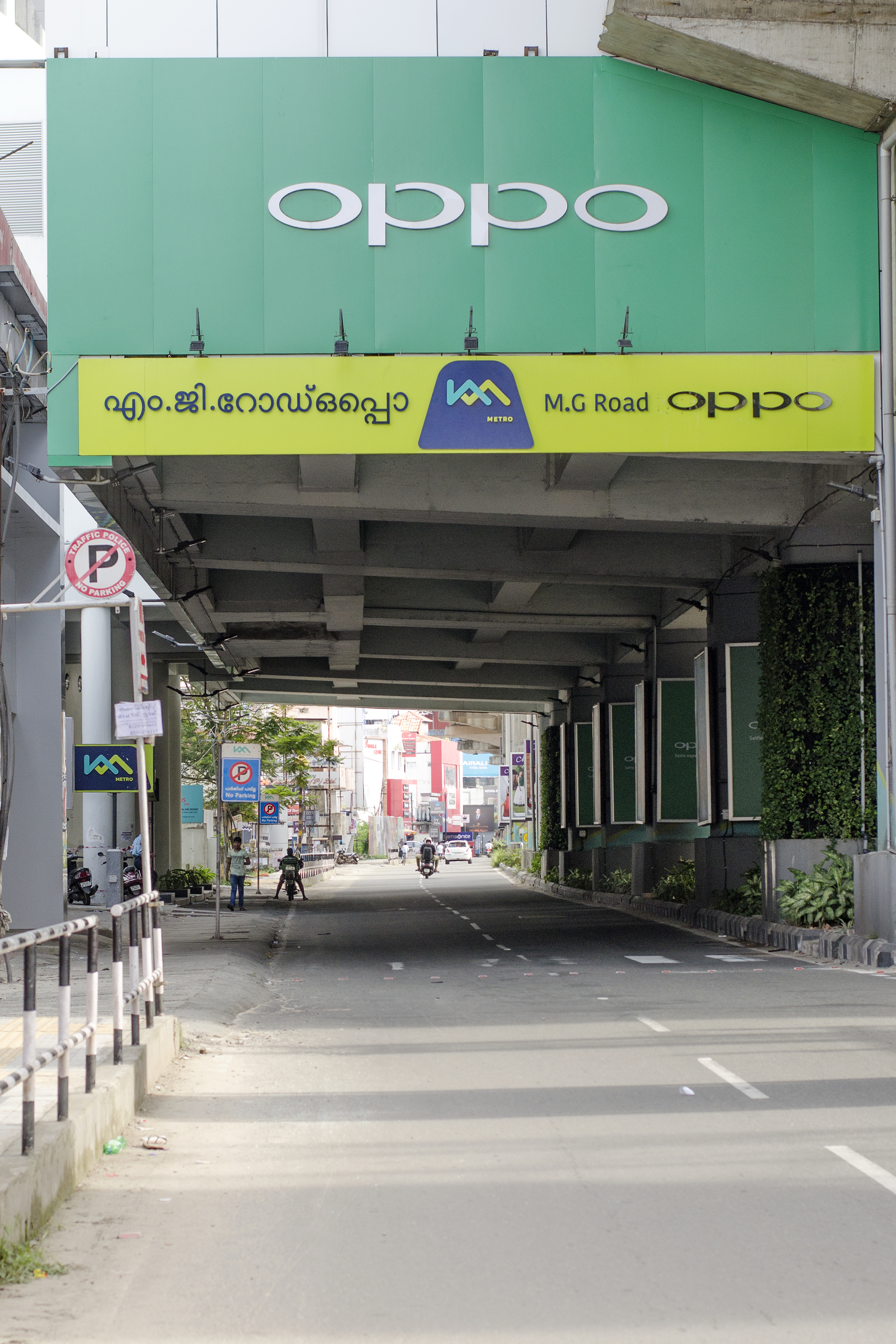
View of M G Road Metro Station

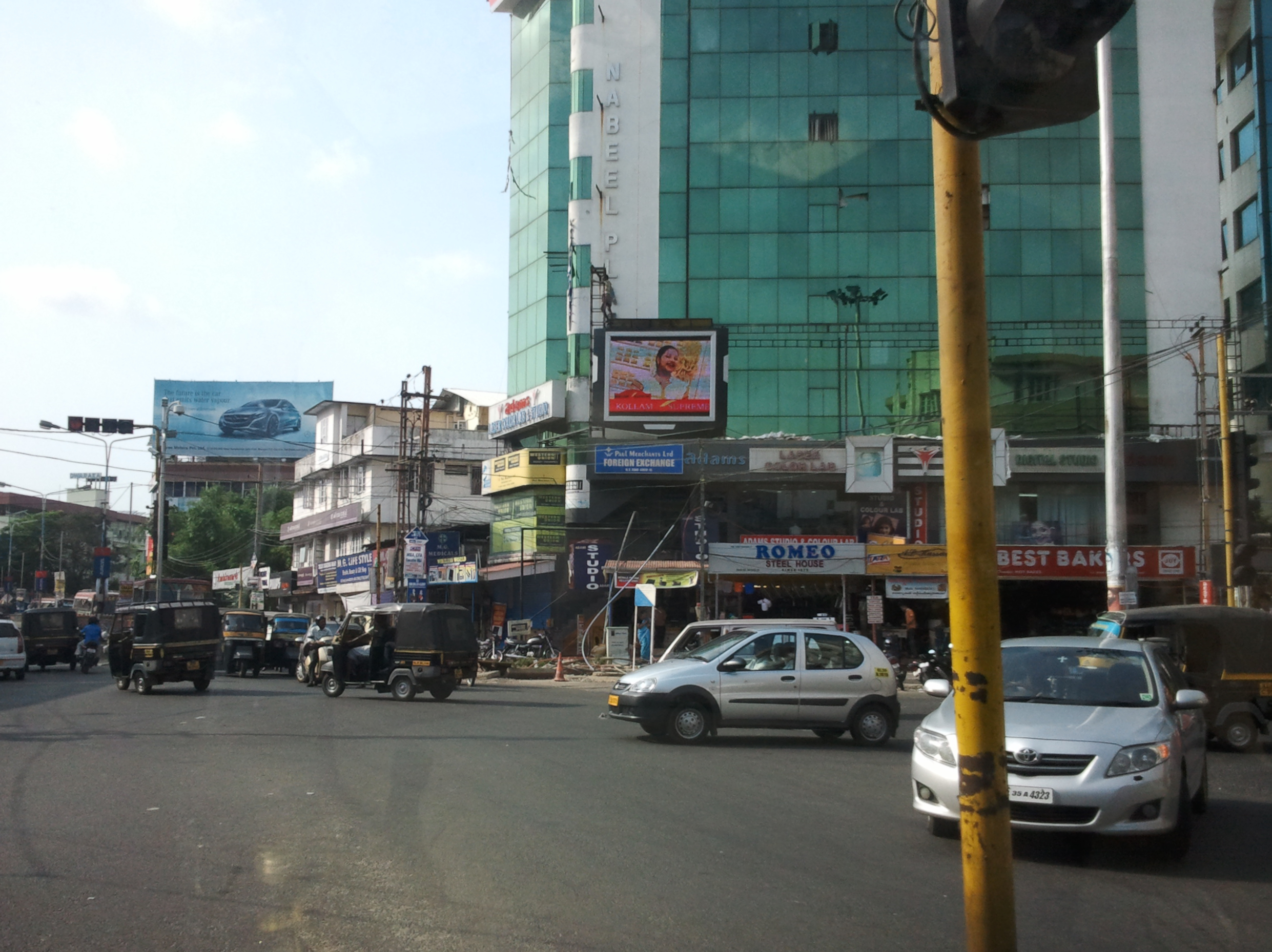
M.G Road /S.A.Road junction at Medical Trust Hospital

MG Road is considered to be CBD of Kochi city with several top retails stores and offices of leading corporate houses located. It connects Vytilla Junction through S.A.Road, Marine Drive (through Banerjee Road) and Chittoor Road (at Kacheripady) at North to Thevara at south passing through 10 junctions.

- Padma Junction
- Kavitha Junction (nearest point to KSRTC Central City Station through Rajaji Road)
- Shenoys Junction
- KPCC Junction (where Maharaja's Stadium and City General Hospital are located)
- Woodlands Junction (famous for several top jewelleries stores)
- Jos Junction (considered to the center of the city and nearest point connecting Ernakulam Junction Railway station)
- Pallimukku Junction with links to East-West corridor- SA Road.
- Atlantis (where almost all airline offices and travel agencies are located)
- Harbour (where Cochin Shipyard is located)
- Thevara Junction

It goes from Thevara to Willingdon Island via Venduruthy Bridge and join with NH47A

== Commercial ==
MG Road is a high end commercial street. The most important corporate house located in this stretch is Cochin Shipyard, one of the largest shipyards in India, located near Harbour side. Several top companies has their offices in this stretch and most of the banks in India maintains their regional offices or main branches in this road. The stretch also houses more than a dozen premium hotels as well as several famed jewellery brands. Some of the leading commercial landmarks are

=== Airline offices ===
Most of the airlines has their offices in Atlantis area. The area is famous for several leading travel agents, holiday companies and sight-seeing tour firms. The Air India Building located in Atlantis Junction is a landmark. Other major Airline/Tour offices are SriLankan Airlines, Singapore Airlines, Jet Airways, Saudia, Kingfisher Airlines, Sitas, ITC, GTL, SOTC, Cox & Kings etc.

=== Jewellery ===
Kochi is one of the most important gold shopping centres in India accounting to about 7 percent gold sales in the country. Jewelries include Alapatt Heritage, Alappat Fashion jeweler, Alappat Arcade, House of Alappat, Francis Alukkas, Kalyan Jewelers, Bhima, Malabar Gold, Tanishq, Geeri pai, Thribhuvandas Bhimji Zaveri, Vanitha, Parakatt jewellers, Paul Alukkas.

=== Banks ===
Almost all national banks maintains its regional or main branches in this road. Regional offices of Central Bank of India, State Bank of India, State Bank of Travancore, ICICI Bank, Vijaya Bank, Dena Bank and Punjab National Bank etc. are located here. Branches of international banks like Standard Chartered, Citibank, HSBC, Oman Bank etc. are also located here.

=== Hospitals ===
- Medical Trust Hospital - One of the largest super-specialty hospitals in South India, this hospital is a leading referral hospital famous for many complex surgeries and treatments. The 750-bed hospital is also extremely famous for its medical tourism
- Sharaf Hospital - near Air India Building at Atlantis
- Cochin Hospital - Pallimukku
- City Hospital - Padma Junction
- Lakshmi Hospital - Diwans Road
- Sree Sudheendra Medical Mission
- General Hospital

=== Education ===
- Sree Rama Varma Boys High School, the city's main Government school is located near Woodland's Junction

== See also ==
- Chittoor Road
