= Panampilly Nagar =

Residential area in Kochi, India

- Suburb
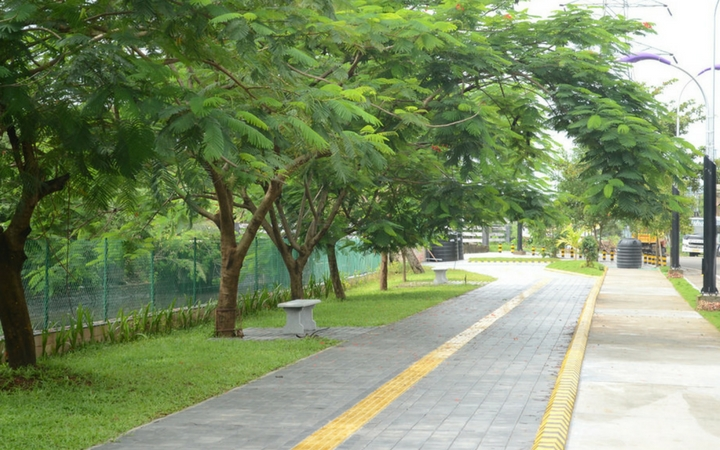
- Panampilly Nagar Walkway

- Location in Kerala, India Panampilly Nagar (India)
- Coordinates: 9°57′22″N 76°17′47″E
- Country: India
- State: Kerala
- District: Ernakulam
- City: Kochi

Government
  - Type: Kochi Municipal Corporation
- PIN code: 682030

Panampilly Nagar is a prominent residential and commercial neighborhood in Kochi, in the state of Kerala, India.

== History ==
Prior to its development as a residential locality, Panampilly Nagar consisted largely of low-lying, marshy land, portions of which were used for cultivation. The area was developed into a planned residential settlement in 1978, including a Low Income Group (LIG) housing colony. This was the second planned colony in Kochi, following the development of the first colony in Giri Nagar. The LIG colony comprised single-room houses constructed on plots of 1.5 cents, intended to accommodate low-income residents. It was also noted as the first colony in Kochi to implement night patrolling. Over time, most of the original residents relocated, and properties were subsequently acquired by higher-income groups, resulting in a shift in the area's socio-economic profile. The Middle Income Group (MIG) housing units similarly transitioned, with the locality becoming predominantly inhabited by professionals such as doctors, advocates, and businesspersons.

Commercial establishments and private offices are primarily concentrated along the Main Avenue and in areas near the South Overbridge. The Panampilly Nagar Welfare Association (PNWA), a residents’ organization, plays an active role in maintaining and improving the locality, including initiatives related to roadside beautification, park development, and sanitation.

== Religious centres ==
The street has a Marian pilgrim centre, Ambikapuram Vyakula Matha Church. Annual feast is held at the church, in September.

== See also ==
- Gandhi Nagar, Kochi
