= Kaloor =

- City
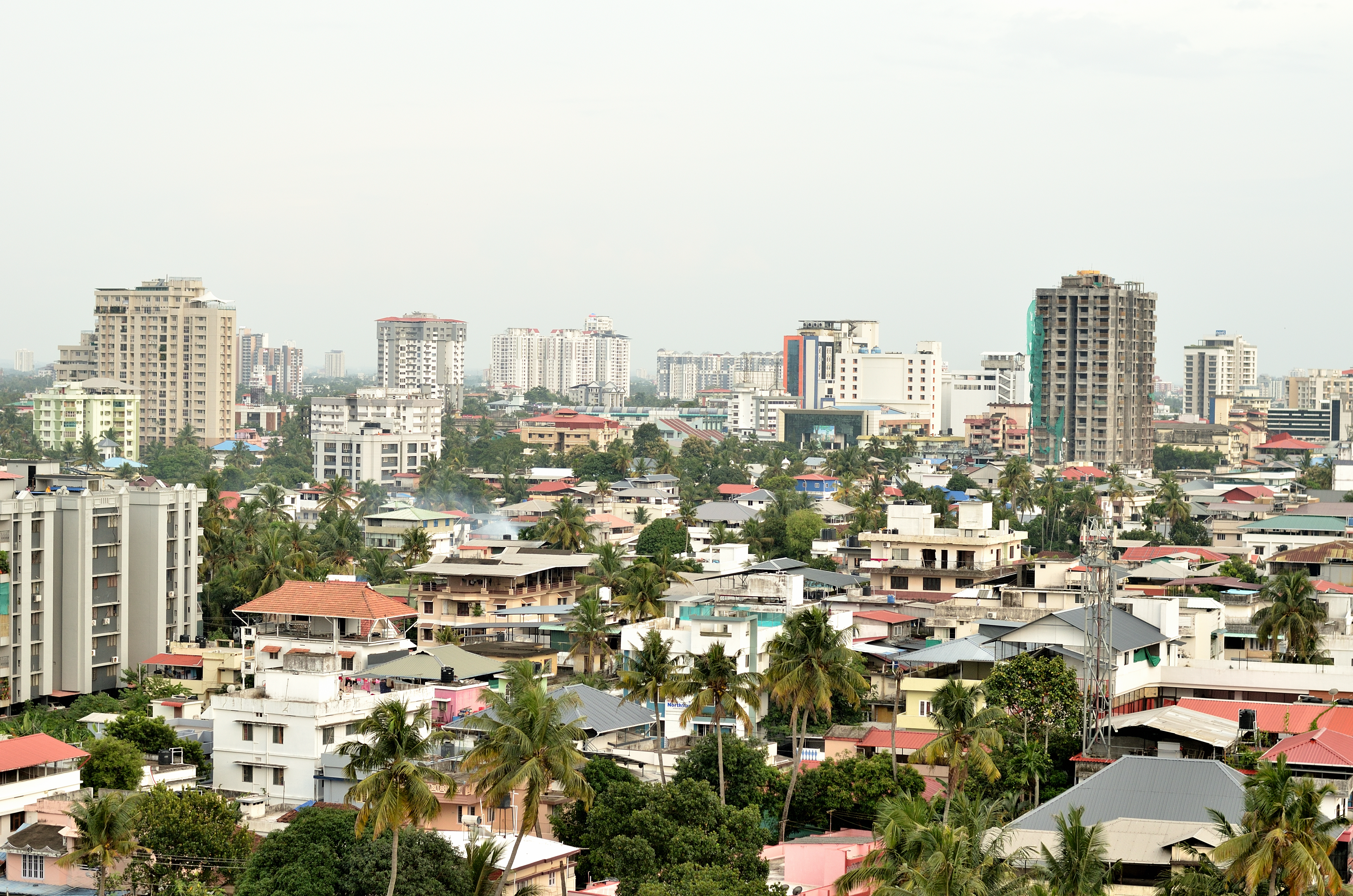
- An aerial view of Kaloor

- Location in Kerala, India
- Coordinates: 9.994°N 76.292°E
- Country: India
- State: Kerala
- District: Ernakulam

Languages
  - Official: Malayalam, English
- Time zone: UTC+5:30 (IST)
- PIN: 682017
- Vehicle registration: KL-07
- Lok Sabha constituency: Ernakulam
- Civic agency: Kochi Municipal Corporation
- Avg. summer temperature: 35 °C (95 °F)
- Avg. winter temperature: 20 °C (68 °F)
- Website: http://kaloor.info

Kaloor is a prominent residential and commercial neighborhood in the city of Kochi, in the Ernakulam district of Kerala. Situated near the geographic center of the city, the neighborhood is bounded by Ernakulam North to the west, Palarivattom to the east, and Edappally to the north.

Historically a residential locality, Kaloor developed into a major commercial and institutional center during the late 20th century as Kochi expanded. The neighborhood is best known as the location of Jawaharlal Nehru International Stadium, one of Kerala's largest sports venues and a major site for sporting, cultural, and entertainment events. Kaloor is also home to the Regional Centre of the Indira Gandhi National Open University (IGNOU). The suburb leads directly to the temple town suburb of Elamakkara and is the birthplace of Malayalam poet Vylopillil Sreedhara Menon. Mathrubhumi and Deshabhimani, two of Kerala's biggest media houses also have their offices in Kaloor.

== Schools ==
- Model Technical Higher Secondary School, Kaloor

== Gallery ==
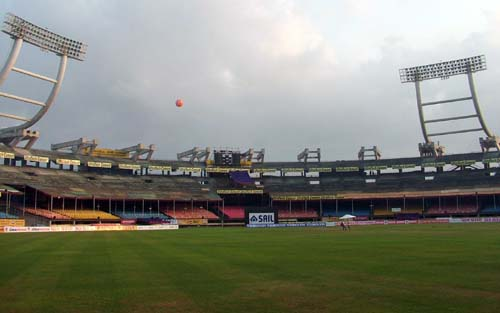
Jawaharlal Nehru International Stadium, Kaloor

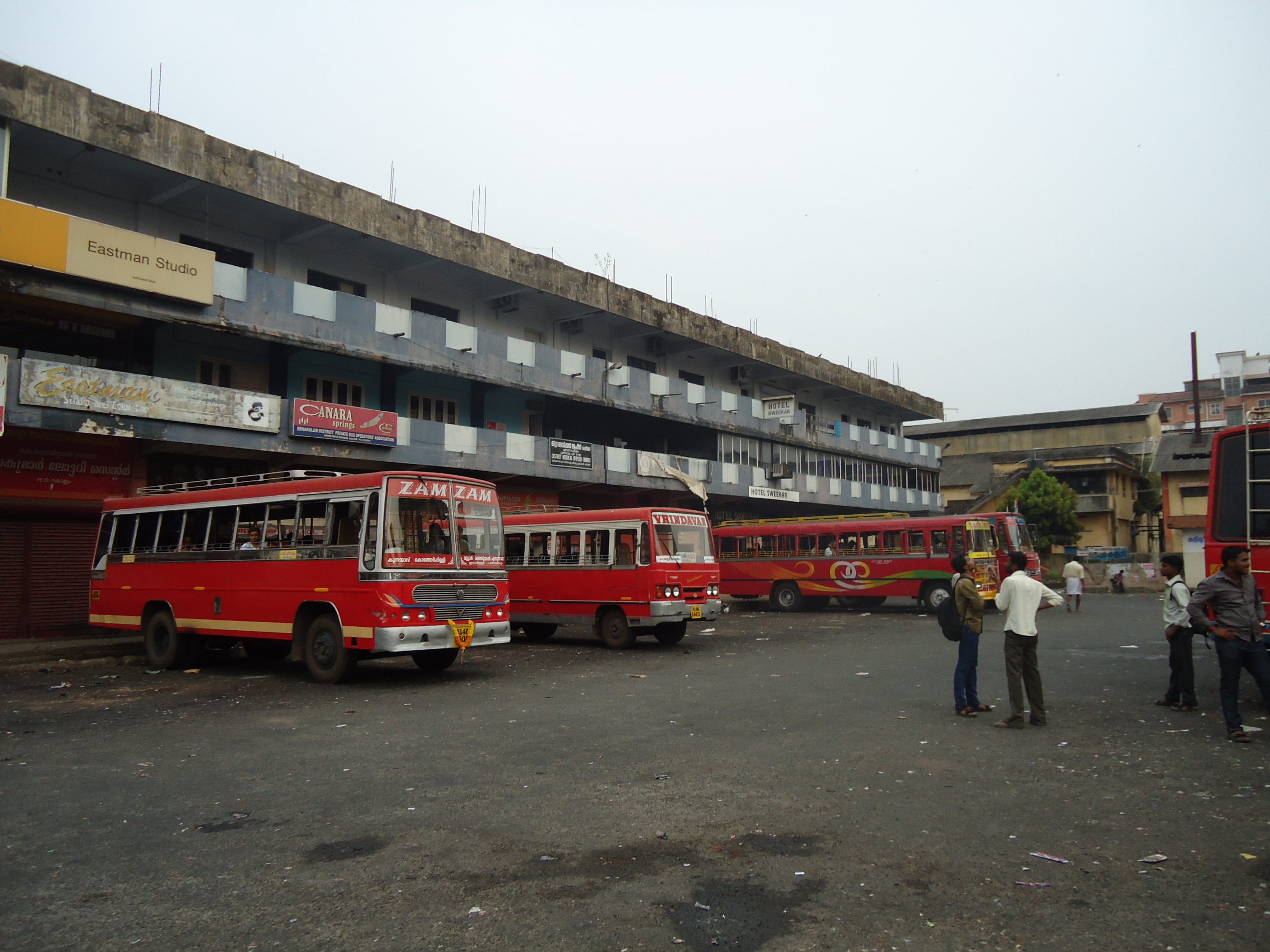
Kaloor Bus Station

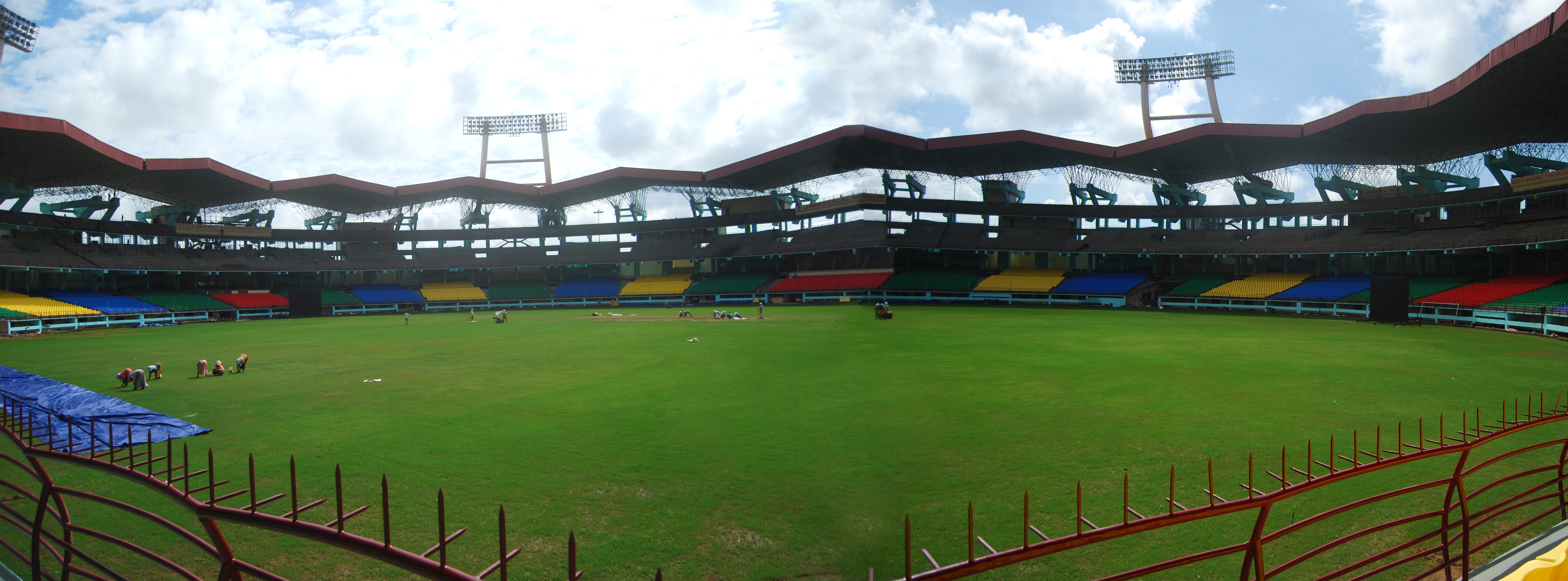
Jawaharlal Nehru International Stadium, Kaloor

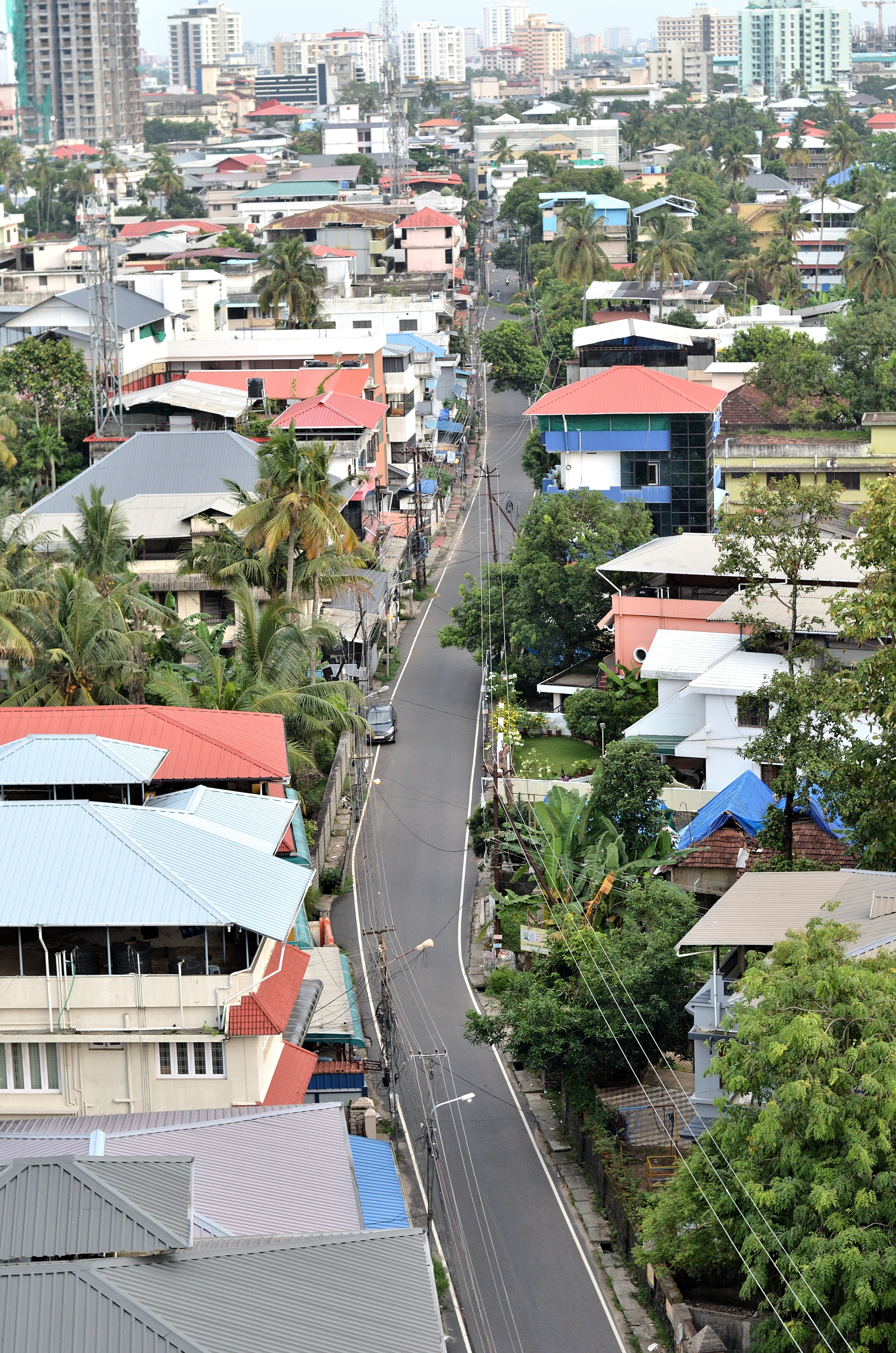
SRM Road
