= Kochi Bypass =

Segment of highway in Kerala, India

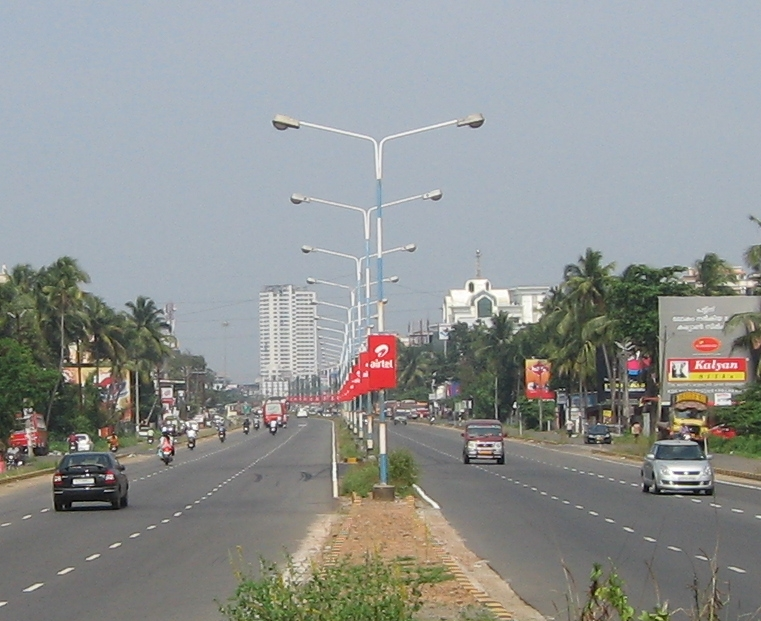
- Kochi Bypass near Vyttila

Route information
- Length: 17 km (11 mi)
- Existed: 1980s–present

Major junctions
- From: Edapally
- To: Aroor

Location
- Country: India

Highway system
- Roads in India; Expressways; National; State; Asian

The Kochi Bypass is a segment of National Highway 66 that bypasses the CBD of the city of Kochi in Kerala, India. The highway stretches 17 km from Edapally in the Ernakulam district to Aroor in Alappuzha district, via Palarivattom, Vyttila, Kundannoor, Madavana and Kumbalam. The Government of Kerala began the preliminary works in 1973. After a slow progress, it was partially opened for traffic in the beginning years of the 1980s. The section between Edapally and Vyttila had four lanes from the beginning. The rest of the carriageway was also upgraded to different sections of 4 lane, 5 lane and 6 lanes by 2010.

Initially conceived as an idea to bypass the truck traffic out of the city, the city has now outgrown the bypass leading to a heavy suburban traffic. Today, this road has turned out to be the most important arterial road in Kochi. The spacious road is going to replace the MG Road as the state's major commercial avenue in a few years time. Space crunch has really started to take a toll on the MG Road, and the NH Bypass provides answer to all the problems faced by the former. Bypass Road has enough width to make the entire stretch into 6 lane with service roads and a median. This 17-km stretch of road running across the city has become the hub of business for the city. This road Edapally - Aroor bypass is expected to slowly overtake MG road as the commercial hotspot of Kochi City and also Kerala state.

== Congested roads ==
According to a survey conducted in 2016, Edappally-Aroor National Highway stretch carries over 77,000 passenger car units daily. An elevated four-lane corridor is being planned on the Bypass to accommodate the ever-increasing number of vehicles. A detailed project report (DPR) is being readied on how to decongest the stretch which carries over 77,000 passenger car units (PCUs) daily. Over one lakh PCUs cross junctions on the corridor. All this calls for an eight-lane highway. Widening the existing four-lane stretch is a tough proposition since both sides of the 16-km-long stretch are heavily built up. An ideal way according to NHAI to decongest the ever-busy stretch that carries inter and intra-State vehicles, which include national permit, container, tipper and tanker lorries, is to build a four-lane elevated highway. The cost per km will come to around ₹120 crore. The NHAI has proposed to take a final decision after Feedback Infra Private Limited submits its DPR shortly on developing the stretch.

== Junctions ==
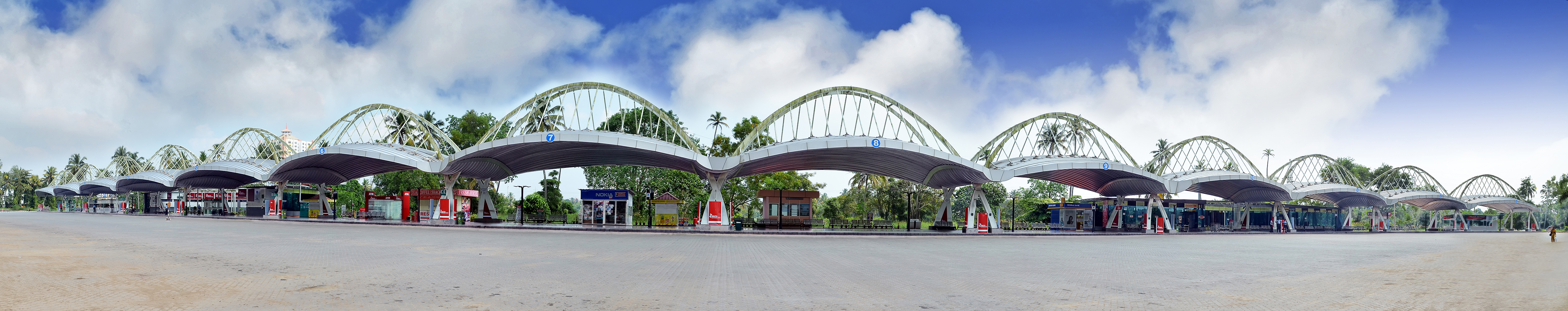
A panoramic view of Vyttila Mobility Hub

- Edappally Junction (Towards Kaloor, Kalamassery and Cheranallur)
- Palarivattom Junction (Towards Kakkanad and Kaloor)
- Vyttila Junction (Towards Kadavanthra and Tripunithura)
- Kundannoor Junction (Towards Maradu and Thevara)
- Madavana Junction (Towards Panangad and Nettoor)
- Aroor Junction (Towards Aroor, Alleppey and Edakochi)

== Educational institute ==
- Kerala University of Fisheries and Ocean Studies, Panangad, Kochi

== Shopping malls ==
- LuLu Mall, Kochi
- Oberon Mall, Kochi
- Grand Mall, Kochi
- Prestige TMS Square, Kochi
- Forum Mall Kochi, Kundannur

== Major hotels ==
- Marriott, Edappally, Kochi
- Holiday Inn, Vennala, Kochi
- Crowne Plaza, Kundannoor, Kochi
- Le Méridien, Kundannoor, Kochi
- Hotel White Fort, Maradu, Kochi
- Starlit Suites, Maradu, Kochi

== Automobile showrooms ==
Since late 2012 this stretch is widely being recognized for large number of vehicle showrooms being opened in the entire stretch.

- Aprilia
- Ashok Leyland
- Audi
- Bajaj
- BMW
- Chevrolet
- Datsun
- Ducati
- Fiat
- Ford
- Harley Davidson
- Hero
- Honda
- Hyundai
- Isuzu
- Jaguar
- KTM
- Land Rover
- Mahindra
- Maruti Suzuki
- Mercedes-Benz
- Mitsubishi
- Nissan
- Piaggio
- Porsche
- Renault
- Royal Enfield
- Skoda
- Suzuki
- Tata Motors
- Triumph
- Toyota
- Volkswagen
- Volvo
- Yamaha

== See also ==
- Aroor–Thuravoor Elevated Highway
- Angamaly–Kundannoor Bypass
