= Nettoor =

Suburb of Ernakulam, Kerala, India

- suburb
- Location in Kerala, India
- Coordinates: 9.927°N 76.31°E
- Country: India
- State: Kerala
- District: Ernakulam

Government
  - Body: Maradu Municipality

Area
  - Total: 3.98 km^{2} (1.54 sq mi)

Languages
  - Official: Malayalam, English
- Time zone: UTC+5:30 (IST)
- PIN: 682040
- Telephone code: 91 (0)484
- Vehicle registration: KL-39
- Climate: Am (Köppen)

Nettoor (also spelled as Nettur aka Tirunettur) is a region in the city of Kochi. It is around 5 km (3.1 mi) from Vytilla and around 8 km (5.0 mi) from Ernakulam Junction Railway Station. Nettoor is located on Panangad, Kochi and is a part of Maradu Municipality.

Tirunettur Railway Station on Kochi-Alappuzha railway line is situated on the northern end of Nettoor. Both NH 66 and NH 966B passes through Nettoor.

== Education ==
There are six educational institutions in Nettoor. Saraswati Vilasam Upper Primary (SVUP) school and Raman Master memorial LP school are two schools located here, which are affiliated to the Kerala State Education Board. There are, also, three schools, Mahallu, St. Maria Goretti and Holy Angels public school, which are affiliated to Central Board of Secondary Education (CBSE). Govt. ITI Maradu is situated at Nettoor, near SVUP school and Trika temple.

== Healthcare ==
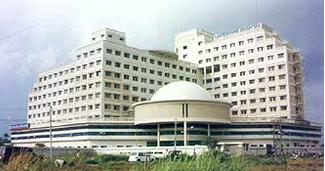
Lakeshore Hospital

There are two hospitals at Nettoor – Nettoor Primary Health Centre and Lakeshore Hospital & Research Centre. Nettoor Primary Health Centre has a bed strength of 6. Lakeshore Hospital & Research Centre Ltd. was first set up as a Public Ltd Company in 1996 and opened its doors as a Multi-Super Specialty Hospital in January 2003.

== Transport ==
=== Road ===
Nettoor is well connected by roads. Bus services are available to various parts of Kochi, such as Fort Kochi, Edakochi, Thevara, Tripunithura, Vyttila, Kaloor, Edapally, Aluva, Muvattupuzha etc. Bus services are also available to some parts of Alappuzha, such as Cherthala, Aroor, Eramalloor etc. There are KURTC Low-floor buses available from Nettoor to the Cochin International Airport.

The nearest bus terminal is Tripunithura bus stand which is about 4.5 km (2.8 mi) from Nettoor. Some of the other nearer bus terminals are Vyttila Mobility Hub (5 km), Ernakulam Jetty KSRTC bus station (9 km), Kaloor private bus terminal (10 km), Mattancherry bus terminus (11 km) and Fort Kochi bus terminal (14 km).

The Kundannoor-Thevara bridge (also known as Kundannoor bridge (on NH 47A)) is the longest bridge in Kerala with a length of 1.74 km (without considering any rail bridges), and passes over the Nettoor railway line and two backwaters. This bridge is the main link between Thevara and Kundannoor.

=== Rail ===
The nearest railway station is the Tirunettur railway station, located at the northern part of Nettoor. Other nearby railway stations are Kumbalam railway station (2 km), Tripunithura railway station (5 km) and Ernakulam Junction railway station (5 km).

=== Air ===
The nearest airport is the Cochin International Airport (CIAL) located at Nedumbassery, which is about 33 km (21 mi) from Nettoor. CIAL handles both domestic and international flights. It is the first international airport in India to be built without Government of India funds.

The Cochin airport provides direct connectivity to popular international destinations in the Middle East, Malaysia and Singapore and to most major Indian cities apart from tourist destinations like Lakshadweep. With a terminal area of 840,000 sq ft (78,000 m^{2}), and a passenger capacity of 1800, it is the largest and busiest airport in the state. It is also the fourth busiest airport in India in terms of international passenger traffic, and seventh busiest overall.

=== Ferry ===
The distance between Nettoor and Thevara is about 4 km by road. An alternate to this route came into existence since 2012 – Nettoor-Thevara Ferry service. Boat services are available between Nettoor and Thevara, saving about 2.5 km of the journey by roadways. The boat can handle 15 passengers and three two-wheelers. There are about 40 services daily.

== Places of Worship ==
=== Temples ===
List of Temples in Nettoor:

- Andapallil Devi temple
- Arakkal Devi temple
- Kallath Sree Krishna temple
- Kootungal Devi temple
- Kumarapuram Subramania temple
- Shanmugapuram Subramania temple
- Thattekattu Sri Krishna temple
- Thekke Pattupurakkal Devi temple
- Tirunettur Mahadeva Temple (known as Trika)

Tirunettur Mahadeva Temple is famous for 'Karkidaka Vavu Bali', a ritual offered for the dead ancestors during the 'Amavasya' or the 'no moon' day of the month of Karkitakam, according to the Malayalam calendar. The main idol of the temple is believed to be installed by the great sage Parashurama. This temple is also believed to be the common temple for all the major Nambudiri families residing in the 32 Namboothiri villages of Kerala. This temple is also known as 'Thekkan Kashi' (English: Southern Kashi).

- Vadakke Pattupurakkal Devi temple

=== Mosques ===
List of Mosques in Nettoor:

- Arafa mosque
- Hira Masjid
- Masjid Dhool
- Masjid Noor mosque
- Masjid Ul Himaya mosque
- Muhabathil Islam mosque
- Nettoor Mahal Juma Masjid
- Salafi Juma Masjid
- Sayyid Moulal Bukhari memorial Islam mosque
- Sirajul Huda mosque

=== Churches ===
List of Churches in Nettoor:

- Holy Cross Church
- Immaculate Heart of Mary Church
- St. Antony’s Chapel
- St. Jude Chapel
- St. Sebastian Church

== Banks ==
There are currently four banks in Nettoor.

- Indian Bank
- Maradu Service Co-operative Bank
- People's Urban Co-operative Bank
- Vijaya Bank

== Other Landmarks ==
- AVT (P L Lawrence & Co.)
- International market
- Le Méridien Nettoor
- Bismi Home Appliances Nettoor

== Notable peoples ==
- V. D. Satheesan, current Chief Minister of Kerala
