= Maradu =

Maradu മരട്
- Municipality
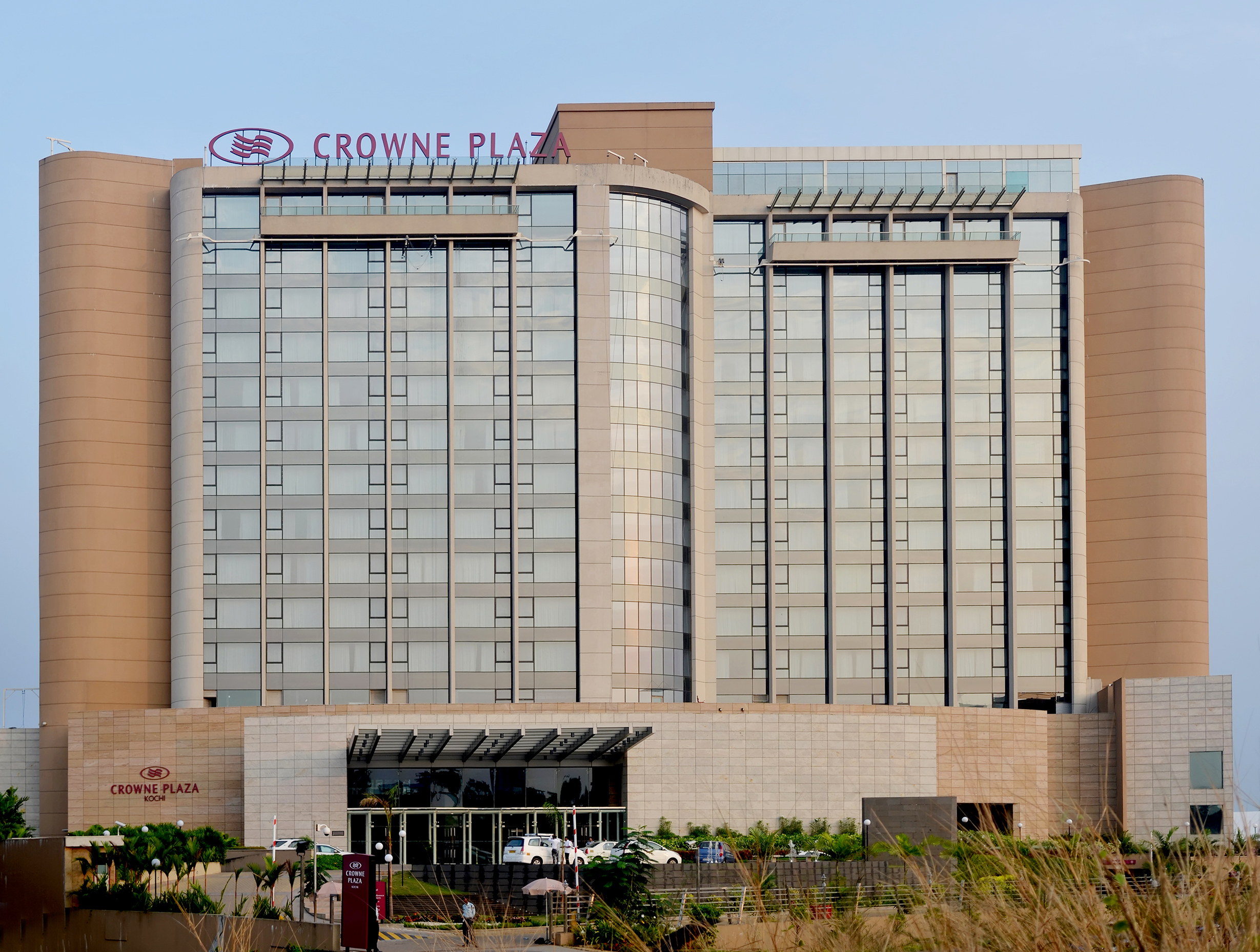
- From top to bottom: 1.The Thevara Canal 2.Crowne Plaza Kochi, Maradu

- Location in Kerala, India Maradu (India)
- Coordinates: 9.89°N 76.38°E
- Country: India
- City: Kochi
- District: Ernakulam
- State: Kerala

Government
  - Type: Municipal council
  - Body: Maradu Municipality
  - Chairperson: TBD (INC)
  - Deputy chairperson: TBD
- Municipal wards: 35

Area
  - Total: 12.35 km^{2} (4.77 sq mi)

Population (2011)
  - Total: 44,704
  - Density: 3,620/km^{2} (9,400/sq mi)

Languages
  - Official: Malayalam, English
- Time zone: UTC+5:30 (IST)
- PIN: 682304
- Telephone code: 484
- Vehicle registration: KL-39
- Website: maradumunicipality.lsgkerala.gov.in/en

Maradu (Malayalam pronunciation: [mɐɾɐɖɨ̆]) is a region in the city of Kochi in Kerala, India. In administration, it is a municipality and census town and is located 6 km (3.7 mi) south of the city centre. As per the 2011 census of India, Maradu has a population of 44,704 people.

On 8 May 2019, the Supreme Court of India ordered five apartments in Maradu to be demolished within one month, for violation of Coastal Regulation Zone (CRZ) rules, although only four of these apartments had yet been constructed. The incident received widespread media attention, and generated controversy across Kerala for the alleged corruption in the local government sector.

== History ==
Maradu was formed in May 1953 as a Grama Panchayath and was upgraded to a municipality in November 2010.

== Geography ==
Maradu is built on various low-lying river islands at the mouth of the Vembanad Lake

== Demographics ==
Historical population
Year	Pop.	±%
1991	34,995	—
2001	41,012	+17.2%
2011	44,704	+9.0%

Religion in Maradu (2011)
1. Hinduism (49.2%)
2. Christianity (35.7%)
3. Islam (14.9%)
4. None (0.15%)
5. Other (0.07%)

As per the 2011 census of India, Maradu has a total population of 44,704 and a population density of 3,620 inhabitants per square kilometre (9,400/sq mi). Of this, 49.6% are male and 50.4% are female. 8.01% of the population is under 6 years of age. Scheduled Castes and Scheduled Tribes constitute 17.28% and 0.40% of the population respectively. The total literacy rate was 97.2% (98.3% for males and 96.04% for females), which is higher than the state average of 94% and the national average of 74.04%.

=== Religion ===
According to the 2011 census, Hindus are the plurality with 49% of the population adhering to the religion. Christians form a significant minority, constituting 36% of the population. Muslims constitute 15% of the population.

== Governance ==
It is administered by the Maradu Municipality, established in November 2010. The municipality is divided into 35 wards, each represented by an elected councillor, who together form the municipal council. The municipality is headed by a chairperson and a deputy chairperson, elected from among its members.

== Culture ==
=== Local media ===
Maradu News is an news network which provides news updates in Maradu and the surrounding areas. The organisation shows news related to politics, local events, crime, and obituaries.

=== Festivals ===
The annual Thalappoli festival, also known as the Maradu Vedikkettu, is held in the Maradu Kottaram Bhagavathy Temple every year, in the month of Kumbham in the Malayalam calendar. Though the festival lasts for 8–9 days, it is famous for its large fireworks displays in the last 2 days. However, in 2024, the Kerala High Court denied permission for the fireworks displays, citing safety concerns and lack of proper licensing.

The Maradu Subramanya Swami Temple holds an annual festival in the month of Makaram in the Malayalam calendar during Thaipooyam. The festival is also famous for its Kavadi Aattam in honour of the deity Murugan.

The death anniversary of Fr. George Vakayil (also known as Vakayilachan) is observed every year on 4 November in the St. Mary Magdalene Roman Catholic Church, Maradu by thousands of devotees. In 2013, he was declared a Servant of God by the Archbishop of Verapoly in the church.

== Developments ==
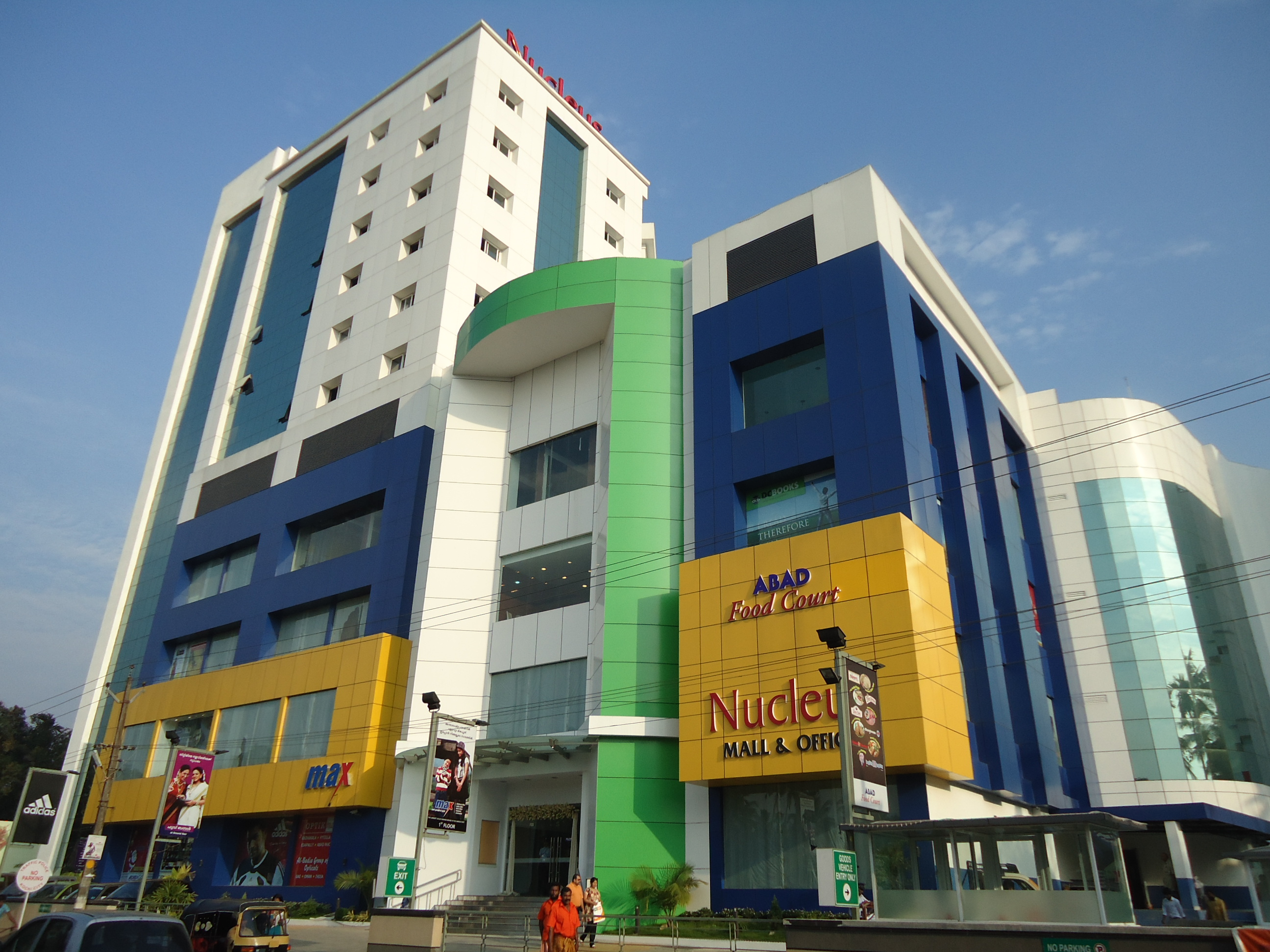
Nucleus Mall in Maradu

Three National highways pass through Maradu (NH 66, NH 85, NH 966 B). Presence of the National Highways and its assimilation into Kochi city brought the area under the radar of investors and is now one of the fastest-growing areas in Kochi. Maradu also houses two 5 star hotels in addition to several other 2 and 3 start hotels. Maradu currently houses two malls, namely Abad Nucleus Mall and Forum Mall Kochi.

NH 66 (Kochi bypass/Panavel kochi Kanyakumari highway), NH 85 (Kochi Madurai highway) and NH 966 B (Kundanoor Willingdon highway) intersects at Kundannoor Junction. There is also an underpass in Kundanooor. A new 6 lane flyover has also been opened recently at the busy junction.

Since the current Kochi Bypass carries over twice the traffic it is designed to handle, the National Highways Authority of India had come up with a proposal for a new bypass for Kochi city a few years ago. As per the selected alignment, the Kochi New Bypass will begin from NH 544 at Karayamparambu, north of Kochi's suburb Angamaly, and end at NH 66 at Nettoor region of Maradu.

In addition to this new greenfield National Highway project, the existing NH 85 (Kochi-Dhanushkodi) starting from Kundannoor junction will be widened to a four lane one under Bharatmala. As per the plans the new widened NH will avoid the current NH 85 as far as Puthenkurishu, starting around 1 kilometre south of the existing Kundanoor Junction.

Maradu municipality oversees the development and administration of Maradu region. Maradu municipal office is in Kundanoor on KRL road.

Maradu is also a part of the region which comes under the Greater Cochin Development Authority (GCDA).

== See also ==
- Maradu apartments demolition order
