= Q1 Mall =

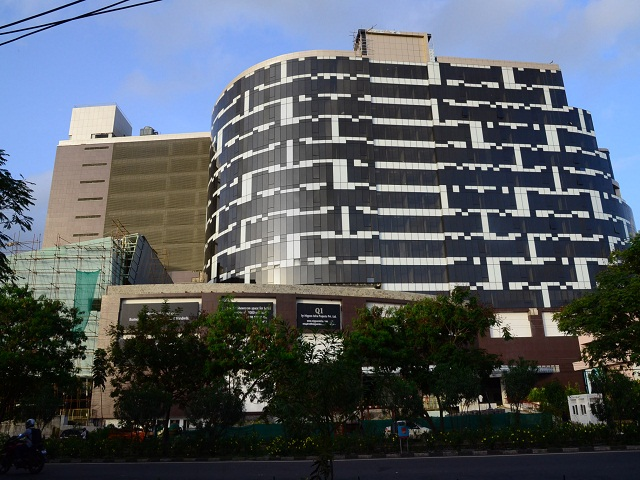
- Mall under construction
- Location: Kochi
- Coordinates: 9.9977°N 76.315°E
- Address: NH 66 Bypass
- Developer: Nippon Infra Projects
- Floor area: 540,000 sq ft (50,000 m^{2})
- Floors: 15
- Parking: 500
- Website: nipponq1.com

The Q1 Mall or Infra Q1 is an upcoming, under construction business cum lifestyle mall in Kochi, India. The mall is developed and promoted by Nippon Infra Projects Pvt. Ltd. It has a built up area of 540,000 sq ft (50,000 m^{2}) on 15 floors with a combination of retail, leisure and office space.

Q1 Mall is located between Pipeline and Vytilla, two major junctions in NH 66.

== Facilities ==
The mall is divided into three sections: Q1 Galleria, Q1 Terrace and Q1 Business Zone. The Galleria and Terrace are part of the retail area which is spread over five floors. The rest of the ten floors form the Business Zone where the offices are located. There is car parking on each floor which can hold thirty cars per floor. Q1 terrace is a leisure area that occupies level-4 and 5, spread over 55,000 sq ft (5,100 m^{2}) with three rooms comprising a training centre, a banquet hall and a double height multi purpose theatre hall accommodating 800 persons. There 260 parking spaces for cars on two levels of parking at the basement.

The structure is earthquake resistant to zone-3. The mall will be fully IBS enabled.
