= Vyttila flyover =

Flyover in Kerala

Vyttila flyover വൈറ്റില മേൽപ്പാലം
- Carries: NH 66
- Locale: Vyttila, Kerala, India
- Maintained by: NHAI

Characteristics
- Total length: 700 m (2,300 ft)

History
- Opened: 9 January 2021

Vyttila flyover is a flyover, that is a part of the NH 66 in Kerala, India. The six lane flyover runs above the Vyttila junction in Kochi, which is one of the busiest junctions in the state.

== Overview ==
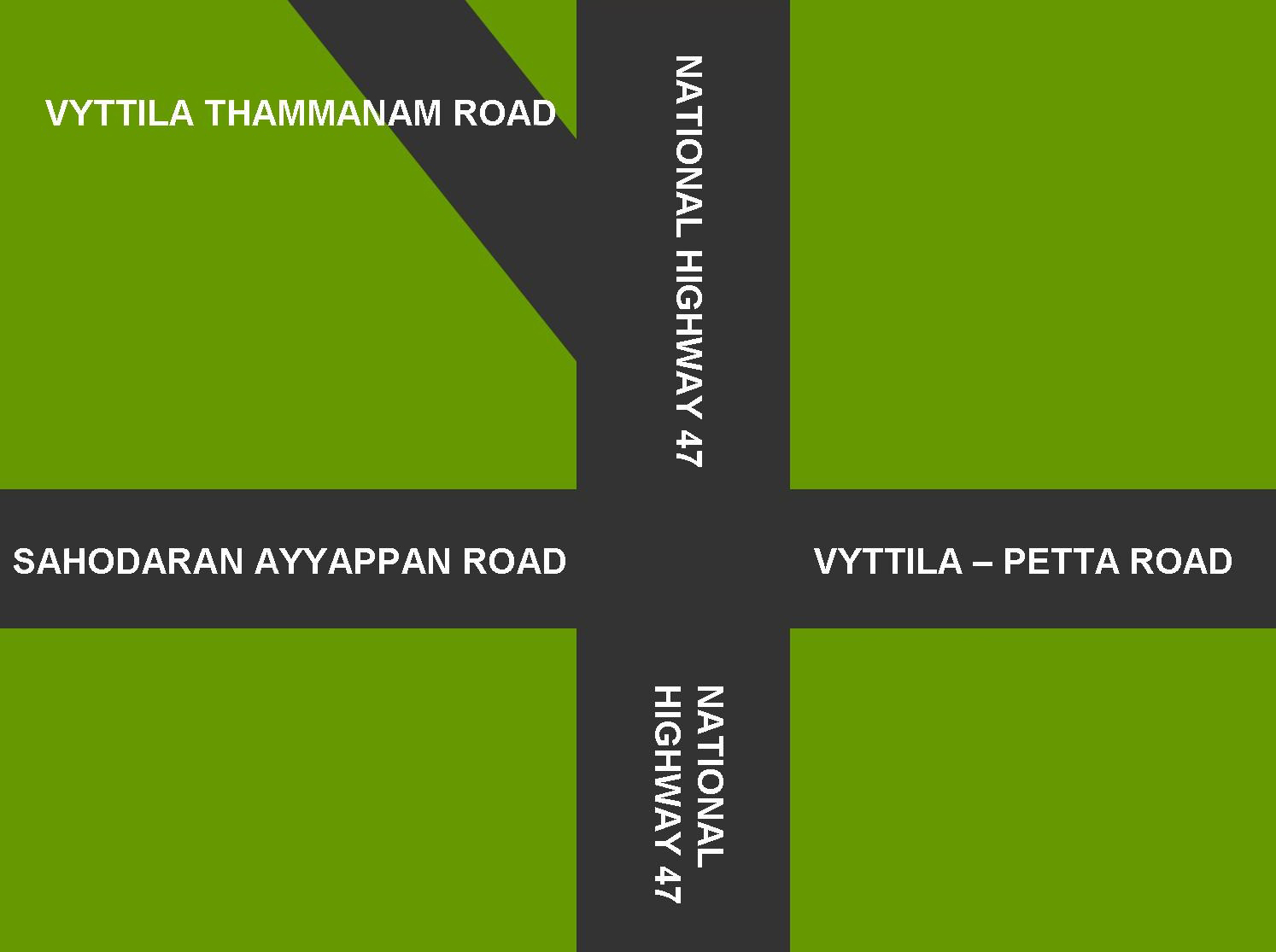
Vyttila is one of the most busiest junctions of Kerala state

On 11 December 2017, Chief Minister Pinarayi Vijayan inaugurated the construction of the Vyttila flyover. Its construction was completed at a cost of Rs 85.9 crore and was opened to public in January 2021. It was built by Sreedhanya Construction based in Thiruvananthapuram under the supervision of state PWD department and National Highway Authority of India. The total length of the six lane flyover is 717 meters and is eight meters high. Two spans of 40 meters are installed on the vehicular side of the Vyttila junction. The pillar of Kochi Metro Rail is placed at a height of 16 meters in the middle of the flyover. The area beneath the flyover has been built in a way so that vehicles heading towards Alappuzha-Thripunithura, Kadavanthura-Thripunithura, and Alappuzha-Vyttila can be controlled using traffic light system.

== See also ==
- Kundannoor flyover
- Edappally flyover
