= College of Climate Change and Environmental Science =

Indian climate research institution

- കാലാവസ്ഥ വ്യതിയാന പരിസ്ഥിതി ശാസ്ത്ര കോളേജ്
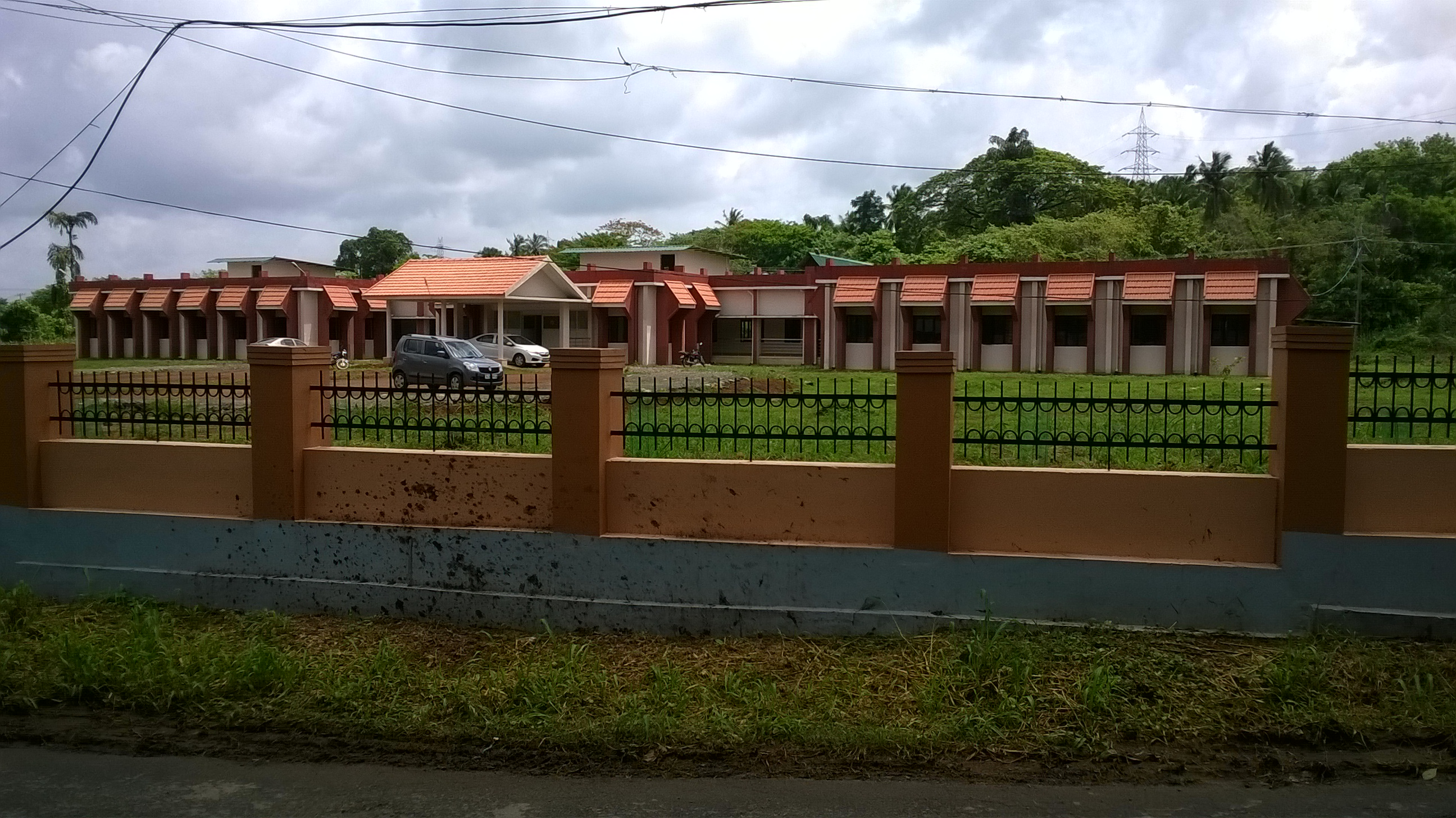
- New Academic Block in June 2016
- Type: Education and research institution
- Established: 2010
- Special Officer: Dr.P.O.Nameer
- Location: Vellanikara, Thrissur, Kerala, India; 10.547248°N 76.291594°E
- Acronym: ACCER
- Website: kau.in/institution/college-climate-change-and-environmental-science-vellanikkara

The College of Climate Change and Environmental Science (CoCCES), formerly called as Academy of Climate Change Education and Research (ACCER), is an institution established by Kerala Agricultural University in 2010 to study about climate change under the faculty of agriculture. The campus is situated at Vellanikara, Thrissur, Kerala, India, and has a five-year course on M.Sc. (Integrated) Climate Change Adaptation and a four-year course on B.Sc. Climate Change and Environmental Science.

== History ==
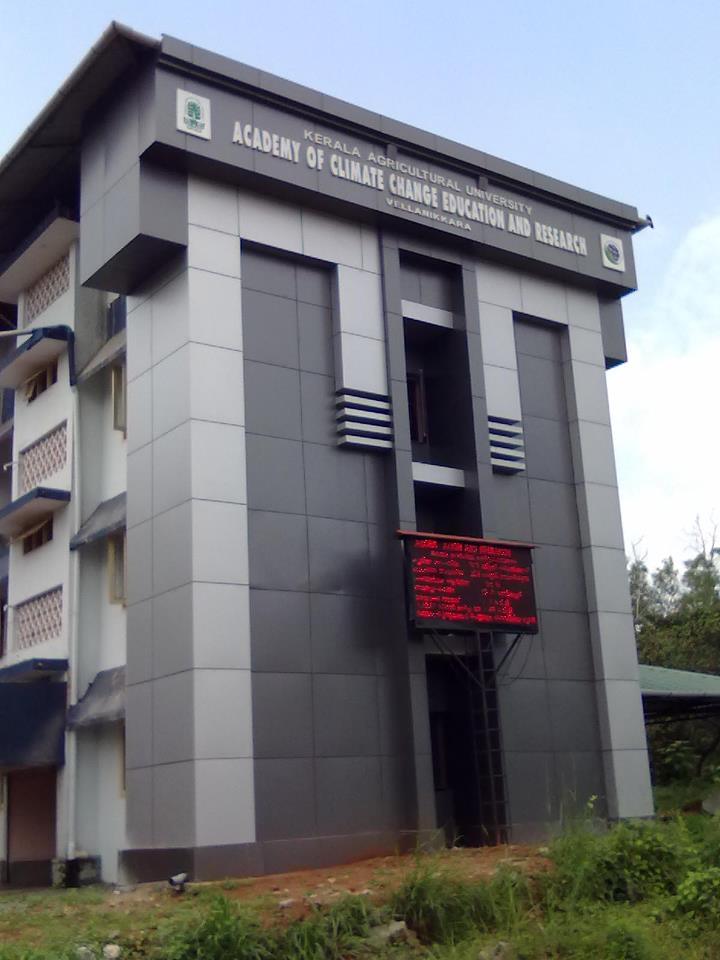
College as of 2 November 2012

When the course was inaugurated on 6 September 2010, the first batch had their initial classes at College of Fisheries (CoF) Panangad, Ernakulam. After CoF was delinked from the KAU to Kerala University of Fisheries and Ocean Studies in 2010, the students were temporarily transferred to a building located at KAU's main campus in Vellanikara, alongside the NH-47, with GSLHV Prasad Rao as the first special officer. The students remained there till 2015, almost a five-year gap, during which the college grew to its full potential of five batches. The new college building was inaugurated by Oommen Chandy, then Chief Minister of Kerala on 28 September 2015. In 2020, the name of the college changed to College of Climate Change and Environmental Science, and a new course was introduced named B.Sc.(Hons) Climate Change and Environmental Science.

== Courses offered ==
- B.Sc-M.Sc (Integrated) Climate Change Adaptation
- B.Sc (Hons.) Climate Change and Environmental Science
