= Puntius madhusoodani =

Conservation status
- Critically Endangered (IUCN 3.1)

Scientific classification
- Kingdom: Animalia
- Phylum: Chordata
- Class: Actinopterygii
- Division: Teleostei
- Order: Cypriniformes
- Family: Cyprinidae
- Subfamily: Smiliogastrinae
- Genus: Puntius
- Species: P. madhusoodani

Binomial name
- Puntius madhusoodani Krishna Kumar, Benno Pereira & Radhakrishnan, 2012

Species of fish

Puntius madhusoodani is a species of fish in the family Cyprinidae in Puntius genus. The species was discovered in 2010, described jointly by Krishnakumar, Benno Pereira & Radhakrishnan and a study first published in Biosystematica in 2012. It was collected from Manimala River in Kerala, India (Western Ghats region), which has a running length of only 92 km and empties into the Vembanad Lake. Puntius madhusoodani is named after Prof. Dr. B. Madhusoodana Kurup, as an honour for his contribution towards the taxonomy and conservation of freshwater fishes of Kerala.

== Distribution ==
Puntius madhusoodani is so for known only from Manimala River which has its origin in Western Ghats Muthavara Hills (2500 feet above main sea level). There is a good chance of finding them in Pamba River as Manimala river is a tributary of Pamba River.

== Description ==
The holotype CRG-SAC 456 with 91.43mm length was found on the Thirumoolapuram region of Manimala River near Thiruvalla in Pattanamthitta District on 17 November 2010. This Puntius fish can be distinguished from the rest of the species by its unique characteristics such as a smaller snout, 2 branched rays and 6 unbranched rays in the anal fin, paired fins hyaline, 9 predorsal scales, 25–26 lateral line scales, dorsal fin inserted nearer to tip of snout rather than to the caudal fin base, branched rays of the dorsal and anal fin is tinted with black color and there are no spots in the dorsal fin base.

=== Coloration ===
All healthy adult individuals in life is dusky black in color from topside and silvery white in color in bottom side. A dark band of about two scales width runs from 22nd to 24th lateral line scales. Fins are dusky to dirty yellow in color. An irregular patch of vague dark brown coloration is present in caudal base in all the specimens.

== Behaviour ==
As of now life cycle and mating or general behavior of the fish is not known as it is known only from 4 individual collected specimens during the survey as part of the River Fish Monitoring Program of State Bio Diversity Board of Kerala State.
