= B. Madhusoodhana Kurup =

Indian fisheries researcher and academic administrator (1954–2026)

B. Madhusoodana Kurup
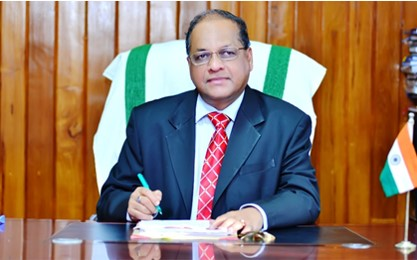
- Kurup in 2021
- Born: 28 November 1954; Kerala, India
- Died: 18 October 2026 (aged 71); Kochi, Kerala, India
- Education: University of Kerala (Bachelor of Science); Cochin University of Science and Technology (M.Sc & Ph.D); Wageningen University & Research (Post Doctoral)
- Known for: Founding Vice Chancellor of Kerala University of Fisheries and Ocean Studies (KUFOS), Panangad, Kochi.
- Awards: Nuffic fellowship –South-south program of Netherlands Marie Curie – European Commission-a rare and district fellowship. Bharat Jyothi award, India International Friendship Society, New Delhi.
- Scientific career
- Fields: Biodiversity, Conservation, Fisheries and Aquaculture
- Workplaces: Kerala Agricultural University Cochin University of Science and Technology Kerala University of Fisheries and Ocean Studies
- Thesis: (1983)
- Author abbrev. (zoology): Kurup et al

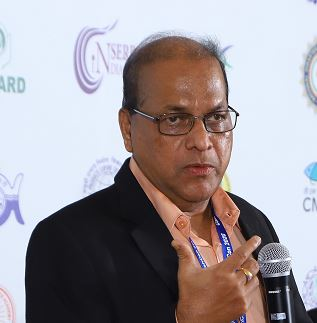
B. Madhusoodana Kurup in 2020

B. Madhusoodana Kurup (28 November 1954 – 18 October 2026) was an Indian fisheries researcher and academic administrator. He was the Founder Vice-Chancellor of Kerala University of Fisheries and Ocean Studies (KUFOS), Cochin and also served as the third Vice Chancellor of Shri Venkateshwara University, Gajraula, Uttar Pradesh. Kurup established and successfully developed the first Fisheries and Ocean Sciences University in the country. He did his postdoc from Fish Culture and Fisheries division, Wageningen University & Research, The Netherlands. Kurup served as UGC Professor (Fisheries) at Cochin University of Science and Technology (CUSAT) for over 18 years.

== Career ==
Kurup spent more than 38 years of teaching and 40 years of research experience. He was also the Scientific Advisor to the Minister for Fisheries, Government of Kerala; and Director, School of Industrial Fisheries. Kurup worked as Fishery Expert in Indo-Dutch Cooperation Programme-Kuttanad Water Balance Study Project - (NL), Inland Fishery Expert - Ashtamudi Management Plan - New Zealand, Fishery Consultant: India Eco-development Project, World Bank, Aquaculture Expert - NZAID Cage culture. He was awarded Aquagris - EU 6th Framework 2007, Marie Curie Fellowship of European Union, Nuffic MHO of NL, NUFFIC South-South programme, Indo-Vietnam Cooperation, Pandit Karuppan Award - 2016, Abdul Kalam Gold Medal Award instituted by Global Economic Prospects and Research Association and Dr. S. Jones Centenary Award - 2010 of Marine Biological Association of India, for his outstanding research contributions in Marine Biology and Fisheries.

He visited more than 15 overseas universities and research institutions as Visiting Fellow and visiting professor. Kurup completed 22 Research Projects with funding support from several national and international funding organisations. He successfully guided 25 Ph.D. and 12 M.Phil. students and published more than 250 research papers in peer-reviewed journals.

Kurup was a lead academician who served as a member of the academic council, board of studies, examiner of various universities. He also served as subja etc. expert in the Agricultural Service Recruitment Board (ICAR-ASRB) in the selection of Deputy Director General (DDG), Assistant Director General (DDG), Institute Directors, Principal Scientists for the ICAR institutions.

He later served as chairman, Scientific Advisory Committee, Rajiv Gandhi Centre for Aquaculture (RGCA), MPEDA-Ministry of Commerce & Industry, Government of India, chairman, Research Advisory Committee, ICAR-Central Institute of Brackish water Aquaculture, Chennai and Adjunct Faculty, Cochin University of Science and Technology -School of Industrial Fisheries. Kurup also served as technical adviser to the Minister for Fisheries, Government of Kerala during 2006 - 2011 in the rank of Government Secretary.

Tor remadevii, the orange-finned mahseer, a critically endangered species of freshwater fish endemic to the Western Ghats of India was identified and named by B. Madhusoodhana Kurup and his student K. V. Radhakrishnan from the Pambar River, in 2007. Thus, it allowed the species to gain finally a scientific name and contributed significantly to the conservation efforts of the species, which was under taxonomic ambiguity for many years.

== Death ==
Kurup died from a cardiac arrest in Kochi, Kerala, on 18 October 2026, at the age of 71.

== Eponym ==
Puntius madhusoodani, a fish species distributed in Manimala River in Kerala, India, was named after Kurup, honoring his contribution to the taxonomy and conservation of freshwater fishes of Kerala.

== Publications ==
1. Sileesh, Mullasseri; Kurup, Madhusoodana; Viji, V.; Korath, Alphi (April 2021). "Length–weight Relationships of Six Rare Deep-sea Fishes From the Andaman and Nicobar Archipelago, India". Thalassas: An International Journal of Marine Sciences. 37 (1): 403–407. Bibcode:2021TIJMS..37..403S. doi:10.1007/s41208-021-00286-4. ISSN 0212-5919. S2CID 231744984.
2. Sileesh, Mullasseri; Kurup, B. Madhusoodana; Korath, Alphi (June 2020). "Length at maturity and relationship between weight and total length of five deep-sea fishes from the, Andaman and Nicobar Islands of India, North-eastern Indian Ocean". Journal of the Marine Biological Association of the United Kingdom. 100 (4): 639–644. Bibcode:2020JMBUK.100..639S. doi:10.1017/S0025315420000478. ISSN 0025-3154. S2CID 225861247.
3. Sileesh, Mullasseri; Kurup, B. Madhusoodana; Korath, Alphi (2020). "Length-weight relationship of deep-sea demersal finfishes from the Southeastern Arabian Sea". Journal of Applied Ichthyology. 36 (6): 855–857. Bibcode:2020JApIc..36..855S. doi:10.1111/jai.14088. ISSN 1439-0426. S2CID 225472864.
4. Radhakrishnan, Renjithkumar Chelapurath; Kuttanelloor, Roshni; Balakrishna, Madusoodana Kurup (2020). "Reproductive biology of the endemic cyprinid fish Hypselobarbus thomassi (Day, 1874) from Kallada River in the Western Ghats, India". Journal of Applied Ichthyology. 36 (5): 604–612. Bibcode:2020JApIc..36..604C. doi:10.1111/jai.14064. ISSN 1439-0426. S2CID 225763790.
