= Kundannoor flyover =

Flyover in Kerala

Kundannoor flyover കുണ്ടന്നൂർ മേൽപ്പാലം
- Carries: NH 66
- Locale: Kundannoor
- Maintained by: NHAI

Characteristics
- Total length: 730 m (2,400 ft)

History
- Opened: 9 January 2021

Kundannoor flyover is a flyover, that is a part of the NH 66 in Kerala, India. The six lane flyover runs above the Kundannoor junction in Kochi, which is one of the busiest junctions in the state.

== Overview ==
The Kundannoor flyover is 731m long in total which also includes the approach roads. It was constructed at an expense of Rs 80 - 88 crore. The flyover facilitate six-lane traffic at a collective width of 24.1 metres. There are 14 spans on both sides. The construction was done by the Roads and Bridges Development Corporation of Kerala Ltd (RBDCK). It was opened to public in January 2021.
