= Kerala University of Fisheries and Ocean Studies =

University in Kerala, India

- Motto in English: Give a man a fish and you feed him for a day. Teach him how to fish, and you feed him for a lifetime.
- Type: Public university
- Established: 20 November 2010; 15 years ago
- Chancellor: Governor of Kerala
- Vice-Chancellor: Dr. Appukuttannair Biju Kumar
- Location: Kochi, Kerala, India; 9.9106°N 76.3172°E
- Administratively part of: Fisheries Department, Government of Kerala
- Colors: Blue
- Website: www.kufos.ac.in
- Location within Kerala Location within India

The Kerala University of Fisheries and Ocean Studies (KUFOS) is a university established by the Government of Kerala devoted to studies in fisheries and ocean sciences. The bill seeking to establish the university was passed by the Kerala Legislative Assembly on 30 December 2010. KUFOS has its headquarters in the premises of the College of Fisheries, Panangad, near Madavana Junction along the Kochi Bypass. The College of Fisheries, established in 1979, was a constituent college of the Kerala Agricultural University. KUFOS is the first university in India exclusively dedicated to studies in fisheries and allied disciplines. The university was inaugurated and dedicated to the nation in a function held at the campus of the College of Fisheries, Panangad, on 20 February 2011.

B. Madhusoodhana Kurup, a member of the Kerala Coastal Zone Management Authority and Director of the School of Industrial Fisheries, Cochin University of Science and Technology, is the inaugural Vice-Chancellor of the university. Mohanakumaran Nair, Dean and head of Department of aquaculture, college of fisheries, Panangad is the first Pro Vice-chancellor of the University. Tresa Radhakrishnan Head of the Department, Department of Aquatic Biology and Fisheries, University of Kerala, is the first Registrar of the University.

The Kerala University of Fisheries and Ocean Studies is an autonomous publicly funded institution established on 20 November 2010, and governed by the Kerala University of Fisheries and Ocean Studies Act, 2010 passed by the Kerala Law (Legislation 1) Department vide Notification No. 19540 / Leg.1 / 2010/Law dated 28 January 2011. This is the first Fisheries University in India coming under the Fisheries Ministry with its headquarters at Panangad, Kochi, along the Kochi Bypass section of the NH-66. Ernakulam South Railway Station is the nearest Railway Station, 12 km away from the campus. Total land area is 69 acres.

The College of Fisheries, Panangad, Kochi, and the Fisheries Research Station, Puthuvype, were disaffiliated from Kerala Agricultural University to form KUFOS which started functioning on 1 April 2011. It is the primary instrument of Kerala state in providing human resources, skills and technology required for the sustainable development of fisheries and the ocean. It acts as a centre of excellence for human resource development in Fisheries and Ocean Studies and the nodal agency to establish relationship with institutions and universities functioning at national and international level.

The Governor of Kerala, is the Chancellor and the Minister for Fisheries is the Pro-Chancellor of the university. The supreme authority of the university is the Senate and the chief executive body is the Governing Council. The Vice- Chancellor is the principal executive who is assisted by the Pro-Vice chancellor, Registrar, Finance Officer, Deans of Faculties, Controller of examination, Director of Research, Director of Extension, Directors of Schools and Heads of Departments.

== Education ==
The study of Fishery Science includes aquaculture, artificial breeding, fish culture and fishery resources. Teaching is carried out at the Panangad campus of the university. The university has teacher scientists, laboratories, fish hatcheries, farms, library and a computer lab. National Service Scheme, NCC ( Naval Wing ), Placement Cell and the Parent Teacher Association take care of the extra-curricular activities of the students. Facilities are available for sports and games. A hostel facility is available for both boys and girls.

The university offers undergraduate (B.F.Sc.), postgraduate (M.F.Sc.) and Doctoral (Ph.D.) programmes in Fisheries Science under the Faculty of Fisheries. The courses under the Faculty of Fisheries are offered in full compliance with the ICAR pattern. Postgraduate programmes are offered in four disciplines and Doctoral programmes in three disciplines. There are 50 seats for the B.F.Sc. programme out of which 31 seats are open. Seven seats are allotted to ICAR candidates and six reserved for children of fishermen. Out of the 14 seats for the M.F.Sc. programme, four seats are allotted to ICAR candidates.

In the academic year 2012–2013, the university started postgraduate courses in MBA under the School of Management and Entrepreneurship, Physical Oceanography & Ocean Modelling (M.Sc.-PO & OM), and Biological Oceanography & Bio-Diversity (M.Sc.-BO & BD).

== Courses ==
- BFSc
- MFSc
- BTech Food Technology
- MSc Food Science and Technology
- MSc Marine Chemistry
- MSc Marine Biology
- MSc Marine Microbiology
- MSc Physical Oceanography and Ocean modelling
- MBA Energy Management
- MSc Biotechnology
- LLM Maritime Law
- MTech Coastal and Harbour Engineering
- MTech Integrated Coastal Zone Management
- M.Tech Ocean and Coastal Safety Engineering
- MSc Remote Sensing and GIS
- MSc Disaster Management
- MSc Environmental Science
- MSc Climate Science
- PhD Remote Sensing and GIS
- PhD Disaster Management
- PhD Environmental Science
- PhD Climate Science

== Departments ==
- FACULTY OF FISHERIES SCIENCE (FFS)
- FACULTY OF OCEAN SCIENCE & TECHNOLOGY(FOST)
- FACULTY OF FISHERIES MANAGEMENT (FFM)
- FACULTY OF FISHERIES ENGINEERING (FFE)
