= Kumbalam, Ernakulam =

Kumbalam കുമ്പളം
- Locality
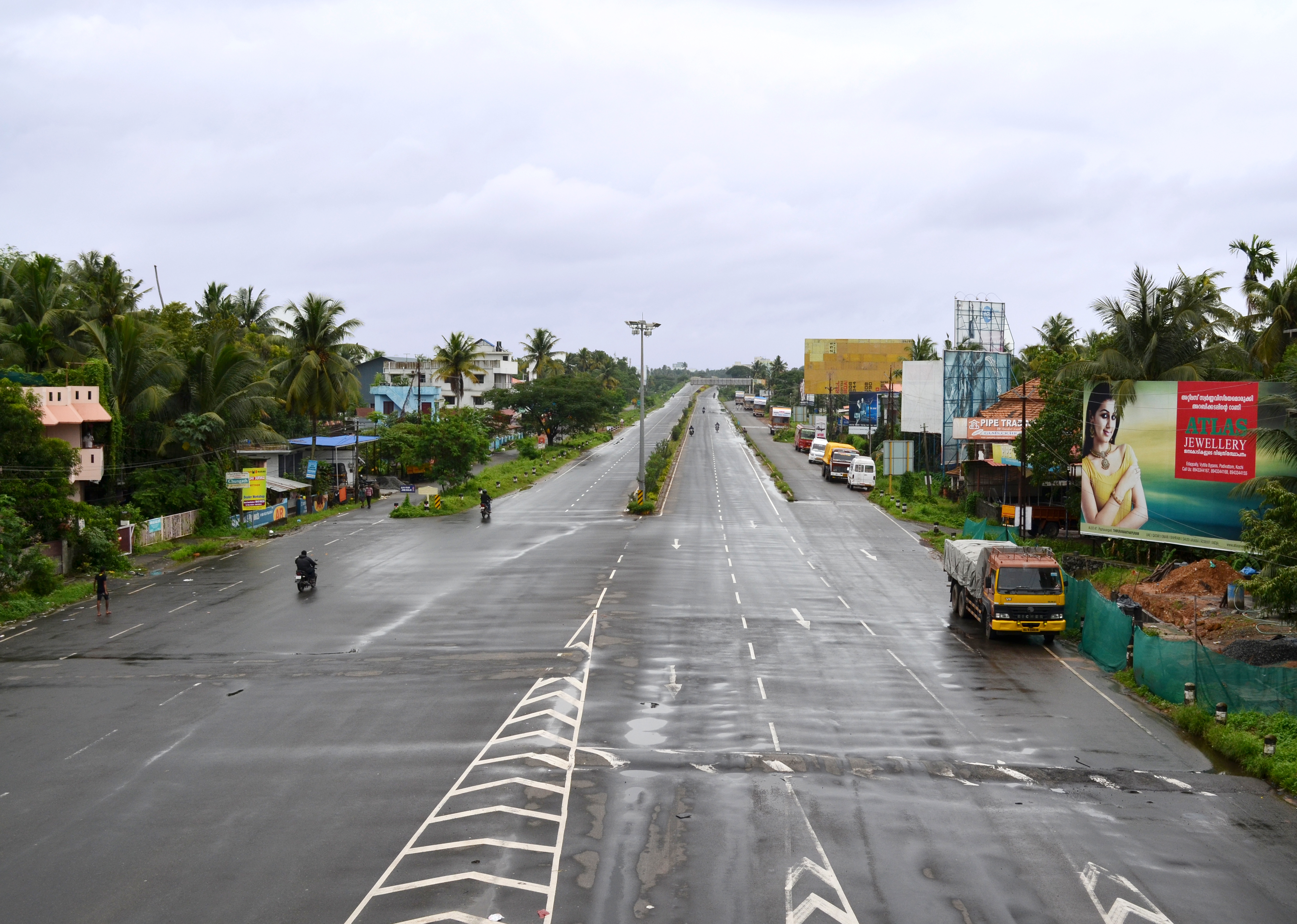
- NH 47 view from Kumbalam

- Location in Kerala, India Kumbalam (India)
- Coordinates: 9.90°N 76.31°E
- State: Kerala
- District: Ernakulam

Government
  - Body: Kumbalam Grama Panchayath
- Elevation: 3 m (9.8 ft)

Population
  - Total: 24,143
  - Density: 1,161/km^{2} (3,010/sq mi)

Languages
  - Official: Malayalam, English
- Time zone: UTC+5:30 (IST)
- PIN: 682506
- Vehicle registration: KL-39
- Lok Sabha constituency: Ernakulam
- Civic agency: Kumbalam Grama Panchayath
- Climate: Tropical monsoon (Köppen)
- Avg. summer temperature: 35 °C (95 °F)
- Avg. winter temperature: 20 °C (68 °F)

Kumbalam is a region of Kochi city, in the state of Kerala, India, that includes Vembanad Lake. It is situated around 9 km (5.6 mi) from Vytilla Junction.

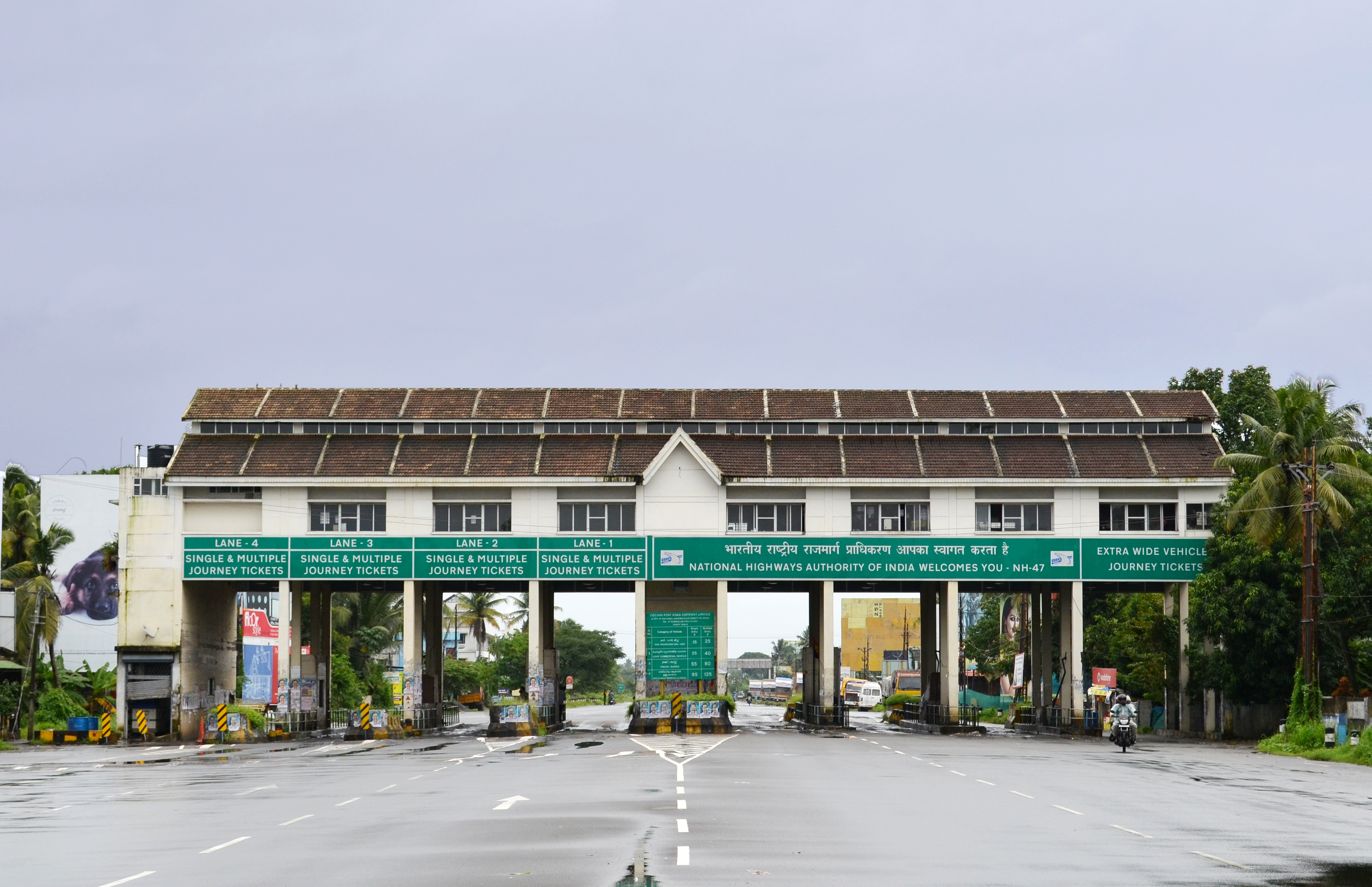
Kumbalam toll plaza

== Location ==
Kumbalam is surrounded by Thevara in the north, Willingdon Island in the northwest, Edakochi in the west, Kumbalangi in the southwest, Aroor in the south, Panangad in the east, and Nettoor in the northeast.
