= Tirunettur Mahadeva Temple =

Hindu temple in India

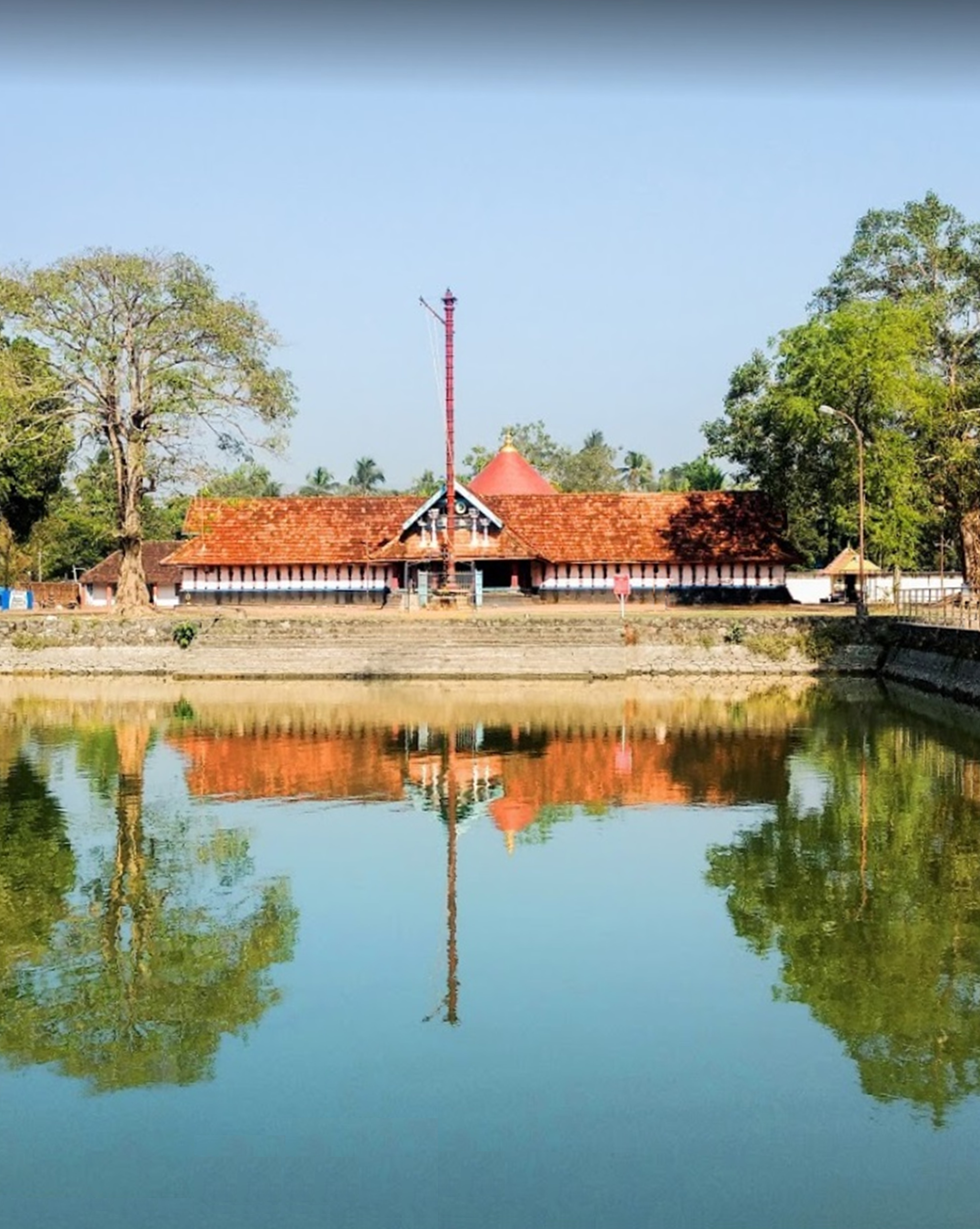
- Mahadeva Temple facing to Temple pond

- Tirunettur Mahadeva Temple, Vyttila, Ernakulam, Kerala

Religion
- Affiliation: Hinduism
- District: Ernakulam
- Deity: Lord Shiva; Maha Vishnu
- Festivals: Maha Shivaratri, Ashtamirohini, Karkkidaka Vavu

Location
- Location: Vyttila
- State: Kerala
- Country: India
- Interactive map of Tirunettur Mahadeva Temple
- Coordinates: 9.9281°N 76.3106°E

Architecture
- Type: Kerala style
- Completed: Not known

Specifications
- Monument: 2
- Elevation: 26.26 m (86 ft)

Tirunettur Mahadeva Temple is located at Vyttila village in Ernakulam district. The temple has two main deities, Sri Parameswara and Maha Vishnu. Deities having separate temple complex; Lord Sri Parameswara in the form of Sri Rudra and Maha Vishnu in the form of Vaikundeswara. Both deities are facing east. It is believed that Shiva temple is one of the 108 Shiva temples of Kerala and is installed by sage Parasurama dedicated to Lord Shiva.

It is believed that Vilwamangalam Swamiyar visited Thiru Nettur Shiva Temple and he had suggested the construction of the temple of Vishnu idol. Apart from the temples of Lord Shiva and Lord Vishnu; there is Sri Krishna temple. Deities in the Thirunettur temple include Ganapathy, Krishnan, Subramanya, Saraswati, Yogiswaran and Pamban Devan.

== Vavu Bali Offer ==
Many people visit Maha Vishnu temple to offer their ancestors on Amavasya day of the Malayalam month of Karkkidakam. The temple is famous for "karkidaka vavu "; on the day of Amavasya, devotees visit the temple for paying respect to their ancestors and offer "bali".

== Temple Structure ==
The temple compound is 5.5 acres; Sri Mahadeva (Lord Shiva) and Lord Vishnu have been built in a separate temple complex. The four sides of the circumference of the Siva temple have been completed and the Nalambalam of Vishnu temple is halved. The temple complex (Nalambalam, Sanctum Santorium) and the lighthouse are built in the Kerala style of architecture. Likewise, the prayer hall and the bellikkal pura are beautiful.

== Festival of Temple ==
The Kodiyattu festival in the temple is celebrated in Dhanu, lasting for eight days and ending with arattu (holy bath) on Thiruvathira day. Since both the temples have flag masts, the festival is common. Shivarathri and Ashtami Rohini are also celebrated with great pomp and flavour.

== See also ==
- 108 Shiva Temples
- Temples of Kerala

== Temple Photos ==
Thiru Nettur Temple

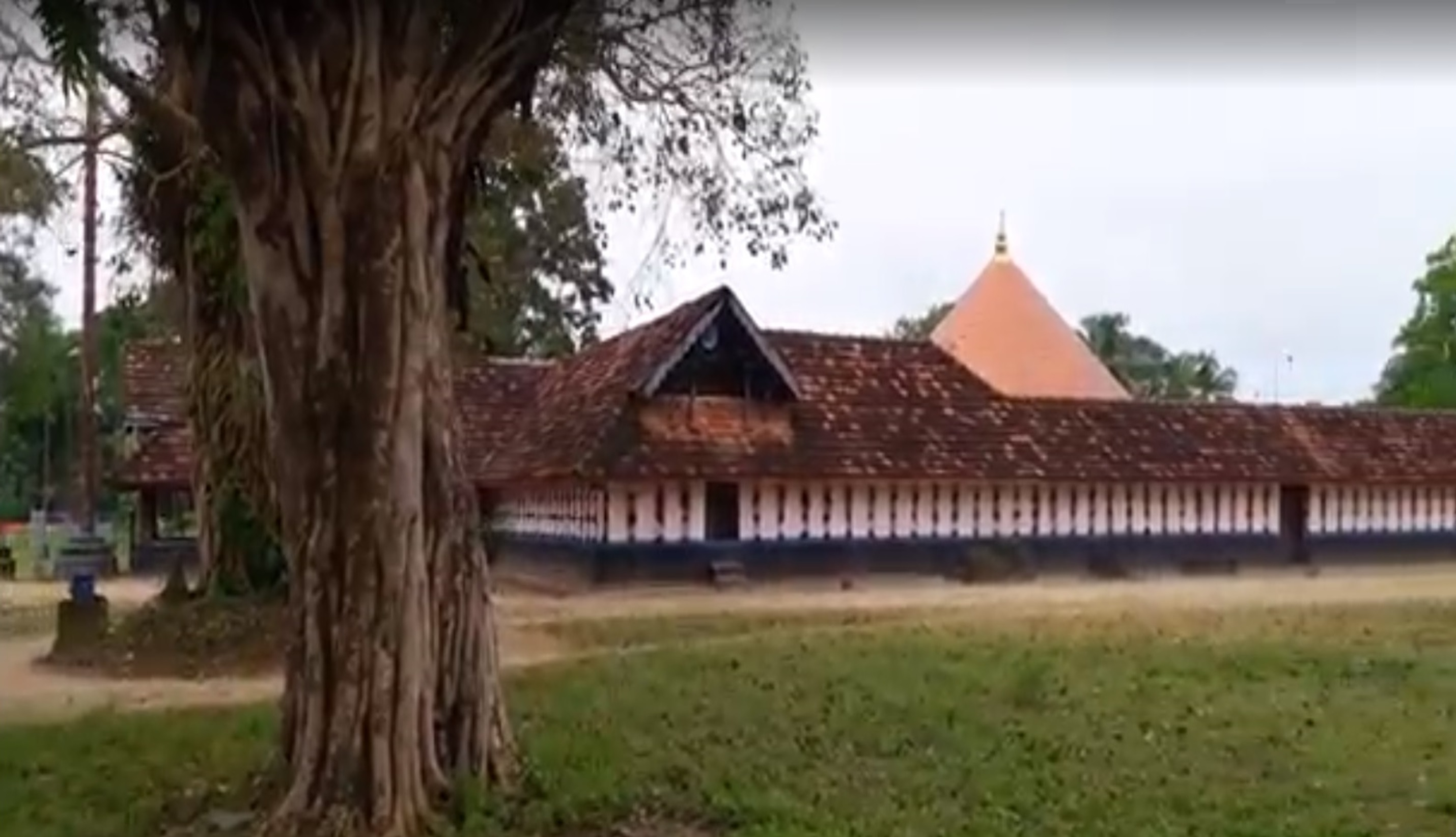
MahaDeva Temple

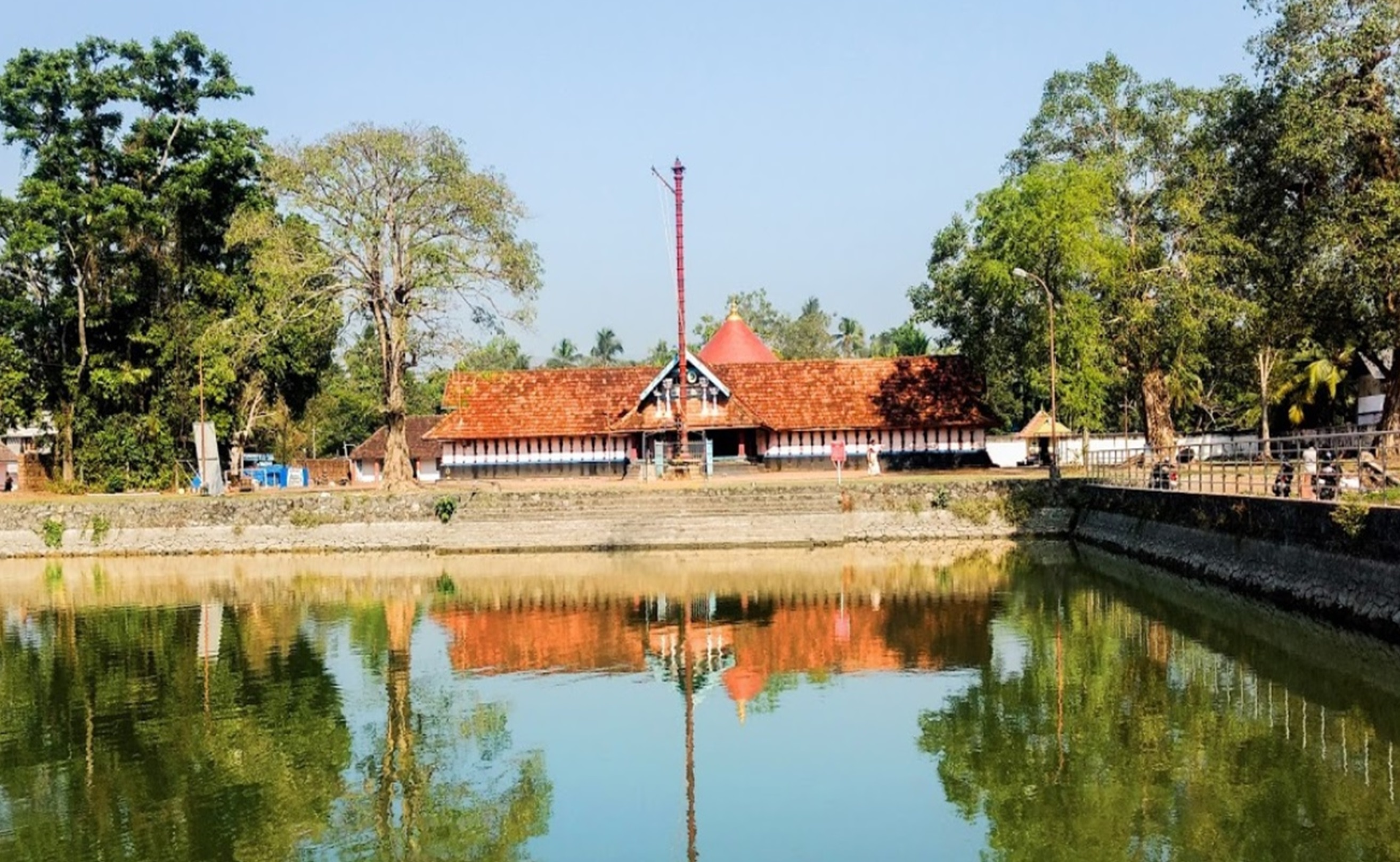
Temple Pond and Mahadeva Temple

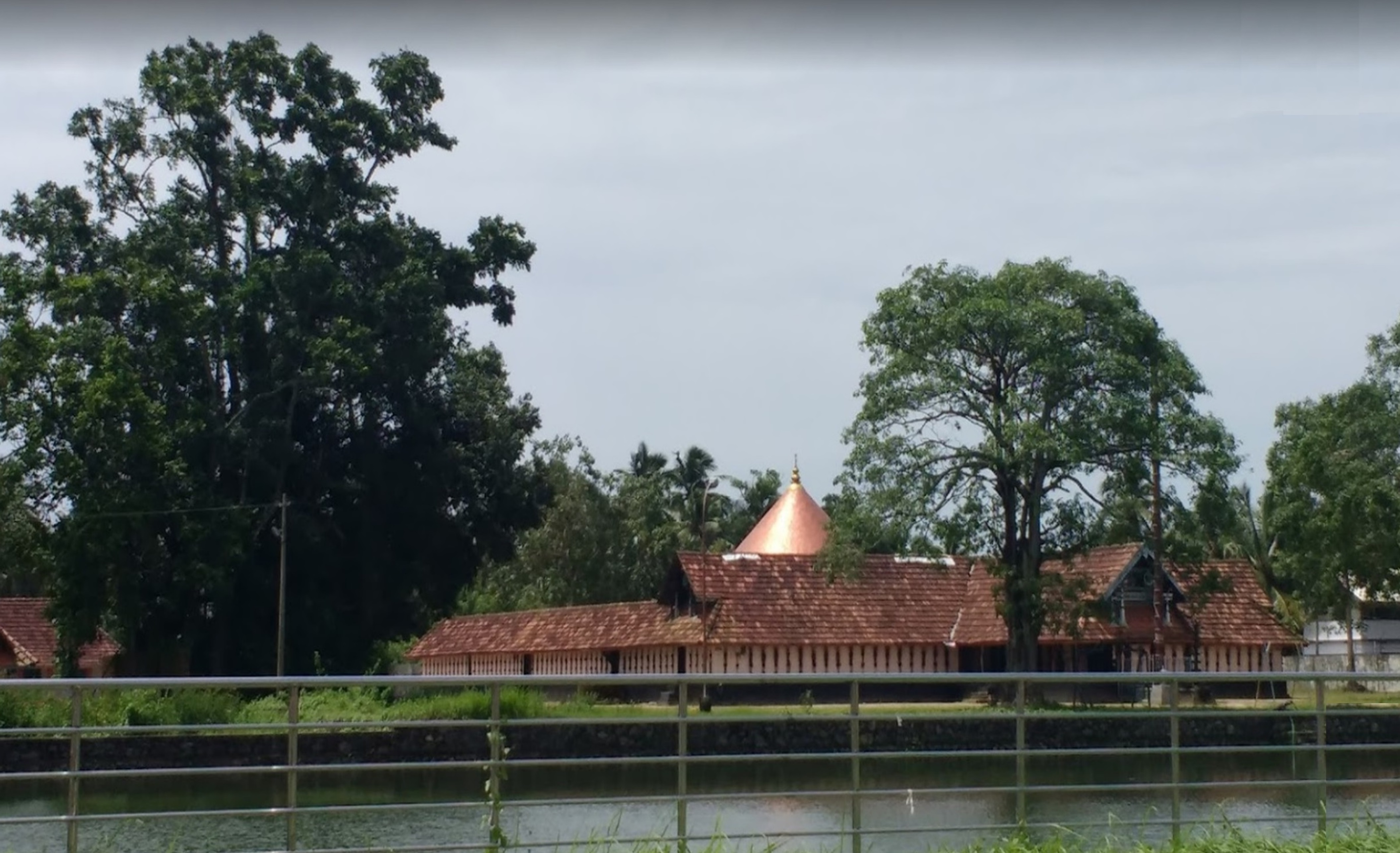
ThiruNettur Temple Nalambalam

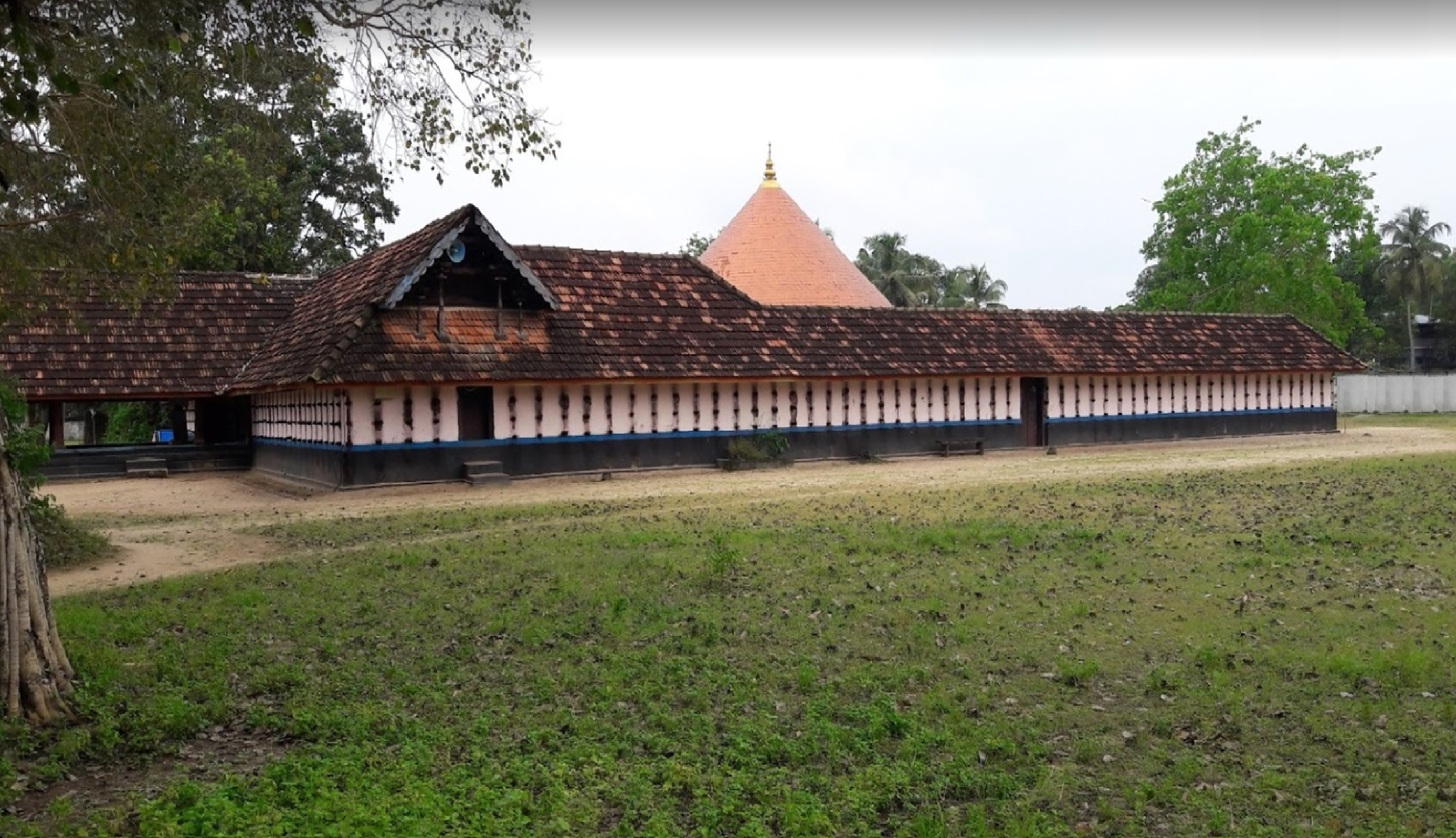
Nalambalam (Mahadeva Temple)

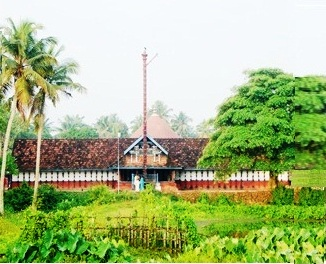
Long View of Temple
