= Forum Mall Kochi =

Forum Mall, Kochi
- ഫോറം മാൾ, കൊച്ചി
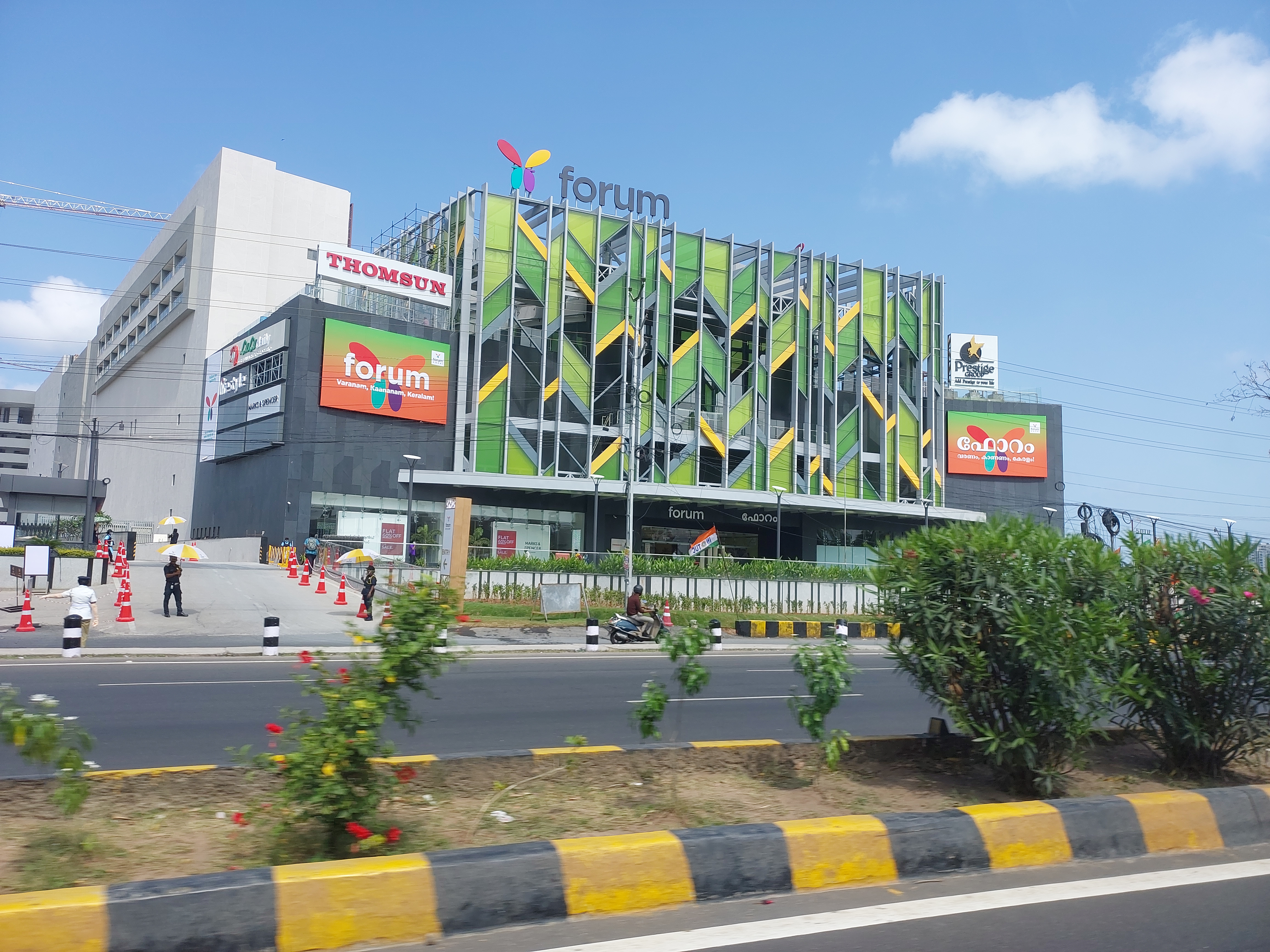
- Exterior view of Forum Mall, Kochi
- Location: Kundannoor, Maradu, Kochi, Kerala, India
- Coordinates: 9°56′38″N 76°18′59″E
- Opened: 19 August 2023
- Developer: Prestige Group and Thomsun Realtors
- Owner: Prestige Group
- Num. of stores: 120+
- Num. of anchor tenants: 7
- Floor area: 1,000,000 sq ft (93,000 m^{2})
- Floors: 5
- Parking: Multi-level vehicular parking
- Website: www.forummalls.in/pages/forum-kochi

Forum Mall, Kochi (also known as Forum Kochi) is a major shopping mall located in Maradu, along the Vyttila–Aroor bypass section of National Highway 66 in Kochi, Kerala, India. Developed as a joint venture between Bengaluru-based Prestige Group and the Thomsun Group, the retail complex spans approximately 10 acres (4.0 ha) with a total built-up area exceeding 1 million square feet. It opened to the public on 19 August 2023 and is among the malls in the state.

== Architecture and design ==
The design of Forum Kochi integrates elements inspired by Kerala's local cultural heritage and nature. The building exterior features a prominent palm leaf motif complemented by architectural lighting.

The interior design incorporates elements inspired by traditional Kasavu sarees, utilizing a white and gold color scheme. The central food court draws aesthetic inspiration from historic Fort Kochi's Portuguese heritage, featuring traditional Azulejo tilework patterns alongside ceiling installations.

== Retail and facilities ==
The mall houses over 120 national and international retail brands spread across five floors.

=== Major anchors and retail ===
- Hypermarket: A 50,000 sq ft LuLu Hypermarket outlet serves as the primary grocery and department anchor.
- Department Stores: The mall introduced Kochi's first Shoppers Stop outlet alongside major fashion department chains including Lifestyle Stores, H&M, and Marks & Spencer.
- Apparel & Luxury: It houses brand outlets such as Calvin Klein, Armani Exchange, Tommy Hilfiger, Superdry, Lacoste, and Under Armour, alongside watch retailers Tissot, Rado, and Longines.

=== Entertainment and dining ===
- Multiplex: Entertainment features a 9-screen multiplex operated by PVR INOX equipped with 4K laser projection, Dolby Atmos audio, and RealD 3D technology.
- Family Entertainment: Houses the first Funcity family entertainment and arcade facility in Kerala.
- Dining: Features a 1,000-seater centralized food court along with fine-dining restaurants and specialty dining choices.

=== Hospitality ===
The complex incorporates a 39-room boutique hotel, The Artiste Kochi, which operates under Marriott International's Tribute Portfolio brand.

== Location ==
Forum Mall is situated in Kundannoor, Maradu, along the NH 66 corridor:

- Vyttila Mobility Hub: 5 kilometres (3.1 miles)
- Ernakulam Junction railway station: 8 kilometres (5.0 miles)
- Cochin International Airport: 33 kilometres (20.5 miles)

== See also ==
- Lulu Mall, Kochi
- Centre Square Mall, Kochi
- List of shopping malls in India
- Transport in Kochi
