= Panangad, Kochi =

Neighborhood of Kochi, Kerala, India

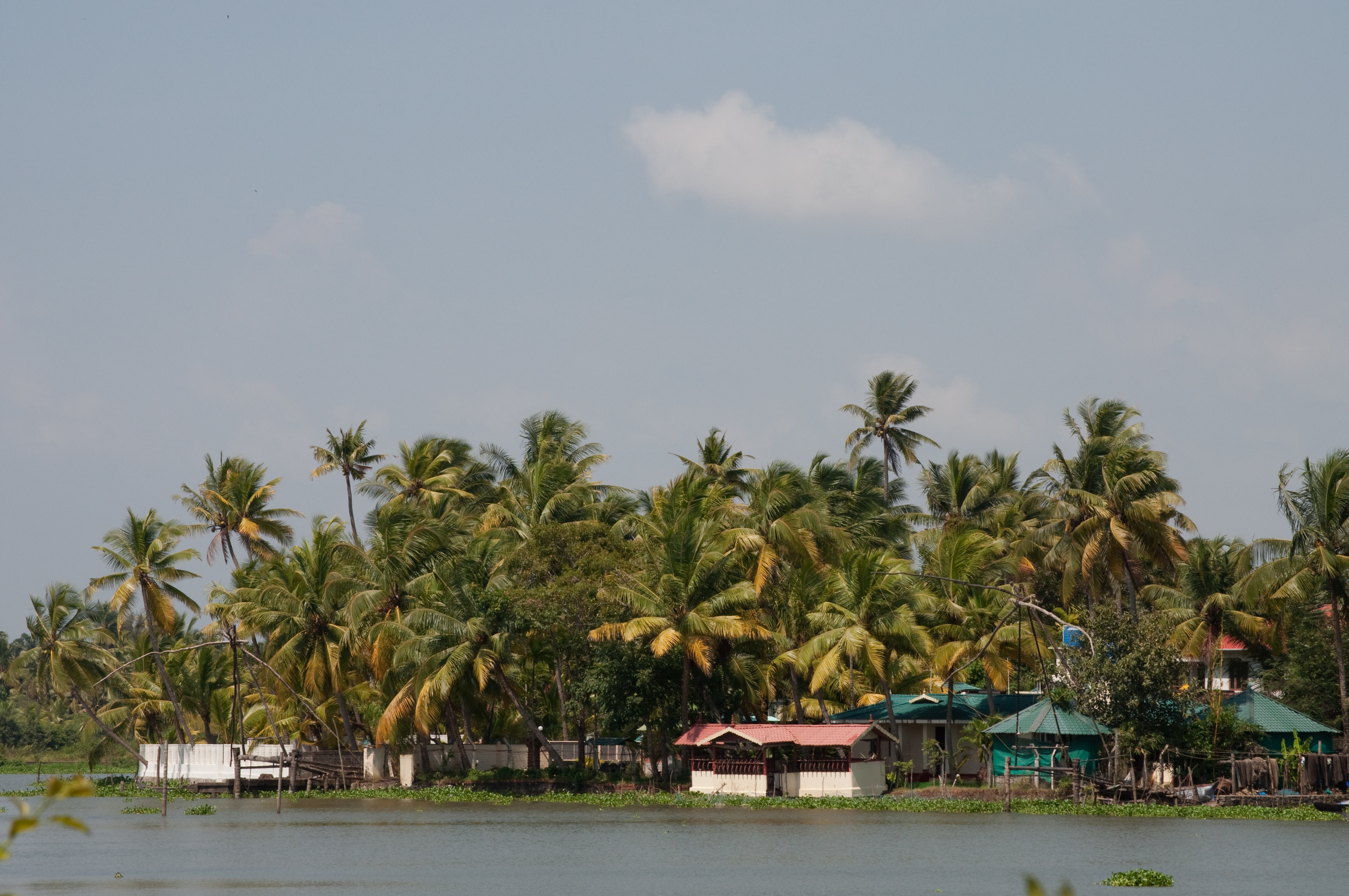
Lakeshore, Panangad

Panangad is a suburban village in Kochi, Kerala state in India. It lies in the skirts of Kochi Bypass. Located only 7.5 km from Vytilla junction and accessible through the national highway 66(N.H.66) by taking a left from Madavana junction while travelling south along the Kochi Bypass. Panangad is one of the suburban villages that make up the urban agglomeration of Kochi.

Only 7.5 km from Vytilla Jn. It was merged into the city during the expansion of Kochi city limits which ends at Kumbalam. The area after the Kumbalam bridge from Aroor belongs to Alappuzha district. It also has good restaurants.

== Office ==
Villages of Panangad, Kumbalam are all under Kumbalam Panchayath, and the panchayath office is located at Panangad. Also, veterinary clinic and some other small offices work at the same plaza. Panangad Police Station is located at the periphery of Panangad village. Panangad post office is an all women office located at Mundempalli.

== Hospital ==
Also, primary government health clinic is located nearby post office about 300 meters away from main road. There are few private hospitals and clinics in and around the village itself. Also, one of the well-known Tertiary hospital V.P.S Lakeshore Hospital is located about a kilometer away from periphery, hence health is never a problem around here.

== Education ==
Panangad has a Government L.P school, Government LPS Udayathumvathukkal, located at Udayathumvathukkal. It also has a high school named Panangad V.H.S.S(Vocational higher secondary school), a UP school named St.Antony's UP School near St. Antony's church and other smaller private schools nearby among which the prominent ones being HIRA public school, Sri Sri RaviShankar school etc. There are two public libraries at Panangad, one at Kamoth a small junction in panangad and other one at the end of the panangad road which also houses the private bus stand and an abandoned boat jetty.

== KUFOS ==
The Kerala University of Fisheries and Ocean Studies is located at Panangad. It is an autonomous publicly funded institution established on 20 November 2010 and the first Fisheries University in India coming under the Fisheries Ministry is headquartered at Panangad along the NH-66. The facility, which was set up at a cost of ₹2.60 crore, is open to the public.

== Religion ==
Panangad has a place of worship at every kilometre of the road which includes mosques, temples and churches which are all kept very neat and serene.

== Transport ==
Panangad is a hub for many intra-city buses that travel through the main city parts which usually starts from the end of Panangad road which is a bus station and ends at Aluva bus station and returns to Panangad for docking and cleaning.

Private buses are available every 5–10 minutes, but public buses are less in number. Since being connected to Kochi Bypass at Madavana junction, traversing to any part of the city is a lot easier using public transport services, though most of the families in the area own at least a vehicle in their house.
