= Abad Nucleus Mall =

Nucleus Mall
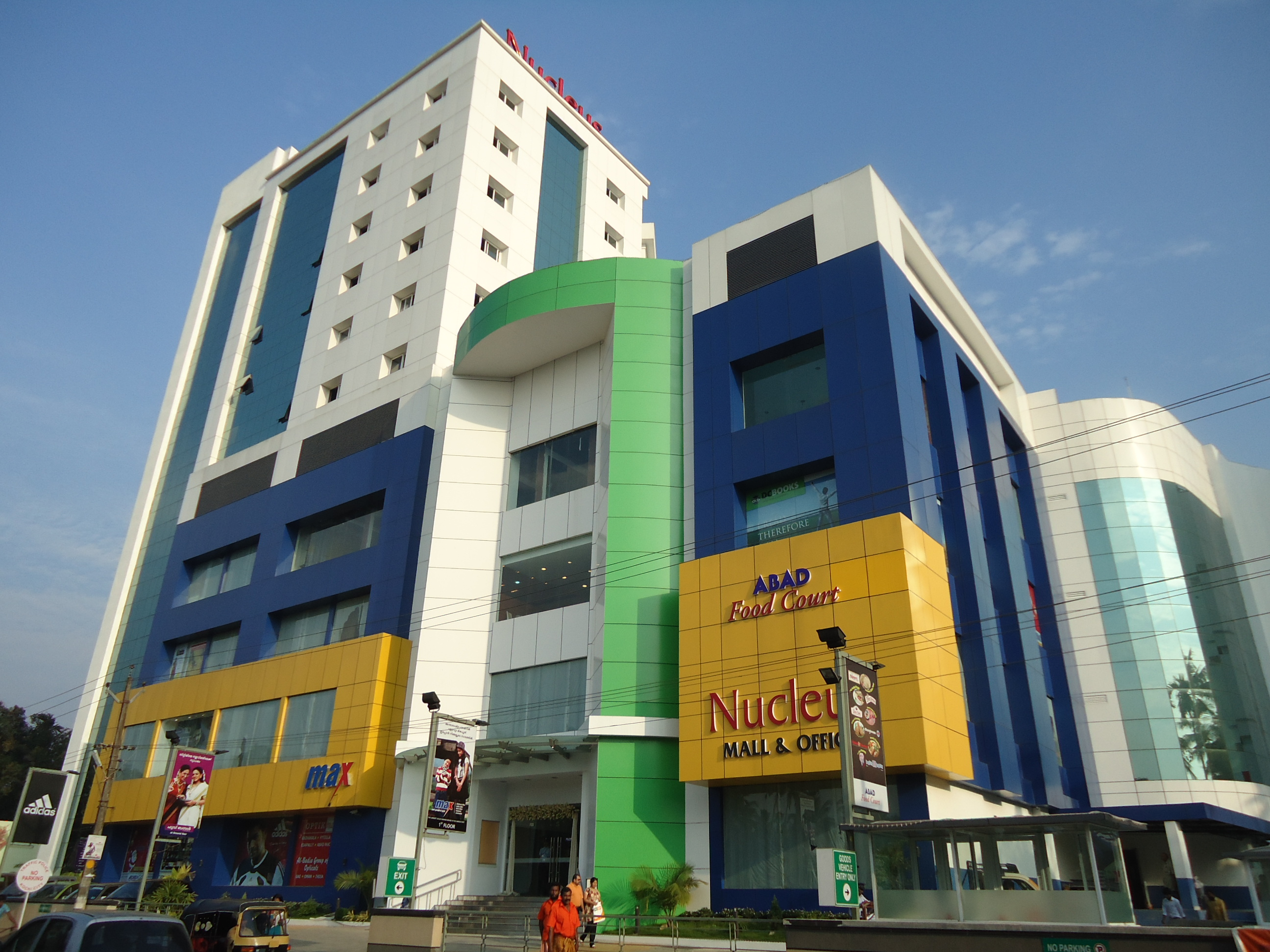
- Location: Kochi, India
- Coordinates: 9°56′22″N 76°19′52″E
- Address: NH 85, Poonithura, Maradu, Kochi - 682304
- Opened: 5 November 2010; 16 years ago
- Developer: Abad Builders
- Architect: Abad Architects
- Num. of stores: 66
- Num. of anchor tenants: 4
- Floor area: 125,000 square feet (11,600 m^{2})
- Floors: G + 3
- Parking: 900
- Website: nucleusmall.in

Nucleus Mall is a mall in Kochi, Kerala and is located in the suburb of Maradu, near Thripunithura and around 8 km (5.0 mi) from the city centre. The mall is constructed and managed by ABAD Builders, a builder of villas and apartments based in Kochi.

The mall has a total built-up area of 2.3 lakh sqft, including 1.25 lakh gross leasable (retail) space. The mall was opened with much gala on 5 November 2010 and is spread over 3 floors. The Mall is India's first LEED certified gold rated green mall. Nucleus Mall has won Realty Plus Excellence Award for 2012 in the category of environment-friendly commercial project of the year in South India.

== Leisure ==
- A 2 screen multiplex with 168 and 132 seating capacity operated by PAN Cinemas.
- A 7,500 sq ft (700 m^{2}) gaming zone operated by Boomerang Game Ventures.
- A 24-seat 6D theatre, the very first of one of its kind in India.
