= Aroor–Thuravoor Elevated Highway =

Elevated highway under construction in Kerala, India

Aroor–Thuravoor Elevated Expressway
- അരൂർ–തുറവൂർ ആകാശപാത

Route information
- Maintained by NHAI
- Length: 12.75 km (7.92 mi)

Major junctions
- South end: Thuravoor
- North end: Aroor

Location
- Country: India
- Districts: Alappuzha
- Major cities: Cherthala, Kochi

Highway system
- Roads in India; Expressways; National; State; Asian

The Aroor–Thuravoor Elevated Highway is a 12.75-kilometre-long (7.92 mi), six-lane, elevated highway envisaged to decongest the suburb of Kochi city and currently under construction in Alappuzha district of Kerala, India. Upon completion, this would be the longest elevated highway in the country. It begins from Aroor and ends at Thuravoor.

== Overview ==
In 2021, Union Minister Nitin Gadkari revealed that central government is planning for a six-lane elevated highway from Aroor to Thuravoor. In December 2022, it was announced that the construction work will begin in 2022 and will be completed in three years. The construction work was finally started in 2023.

The six lane elevated highway will be constructed in a length of 12.75 km from just before Aroor to south of Thuravoor at a width of 26 meter. The construction contract has been taken over by the Ashoka Buildcon Company of Maharashtra for ₹1,668.50 crore. The highway will be constructed by installing large pillars in the center of the existing four-lane road. It will be also one of the longest single-pillared skyway in the country and is expected to be opened in 2027.

== See also ==
- Kochi Bypass
