= Kundannoor =

Region of Kochi in Kerala, India

- Region in Kochi city
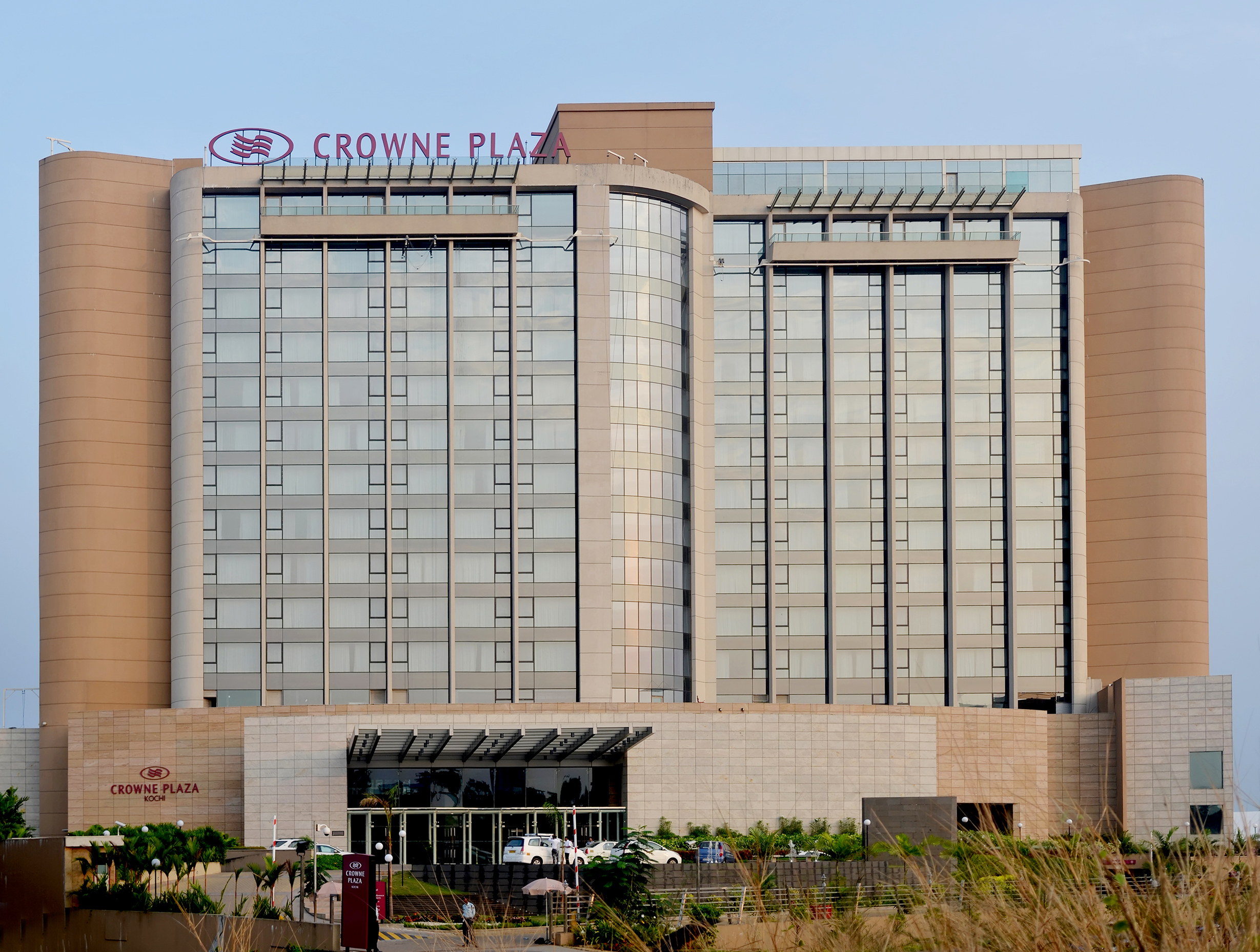
- Crowne Plaza Kochi Hotel at Kundannoor
- Interactive map of Kundannoor
- Coordinates: 9.969°N 76.318°E
- Country: India
- City UA: Kochi
- State: Kerala
- District: Ernakulam
- Founder: Sravan
- Named for: Sravan

Government
  - Body: Maradu Municipality

Languages
  - Official: Malayalam, English
- Time zone: UTC+5:30 (IST)
- Postal code: 682304

Kundannoor is a region in the city of Kochi, in the state of Kerala, India. It is located around 3.5 km from Vytilla Junction and around 7 km from Ernakulam Junction Railway Station.Kundanoor is located on the busiest road of the city and state, the Kochi Bypass, at the junction of three National Highways, namely NH 66, NH 85 and NH 966B. NH 966B is the second shortest National highway in India.

The junction now has a six-lane flyover due to the high traffic it handles. Since the current Kochi Bypass carries over twice the traffic it is designed to handle, the National Highways Authority of India had come up with a proposal for a new bypass for Kochi city a few years ago. As per the selected alignment, the Kochi new bypass will begin from National Highway 544 at Karayamparambu, north of Kochi's suburb Angamaly, and end at National Highway 66 at Nettoor region of Maradu.

In addition to this new greenfield National Highway project, the existing National Highway 85 (Kochi-Dhanushkodi) starting from Kundannoor junction will be widened to a four-lane one under Bharatmala. As per the plans the new widened NH will avoid the current NH 85 until Puthenkurishu, starting around 1 kilometre south of the existing Kundanoor Junction.

The Le Meridien and Crowne Plaza hotels are near Kundanoor junction. Many shopping malls are proposed and some including Prestige Group's Kochi Forum Thomson Mall are under construction in Kundanoor. Kundanoor is also unofficially known as the automobile hub of Kochi, since it houses the most vehicle showrooms in the city and the state, including Mercedes-Benz, Volvo, Porsche, Audi, Volkswagen, Suzuki Nexa, Honda BigWing Topline, Jeep, Harley Davidson, etc.
