= Lakeshore Hospital =

Hospital in Kochi, India

VPS Lakeshore
- VPS Healthcare
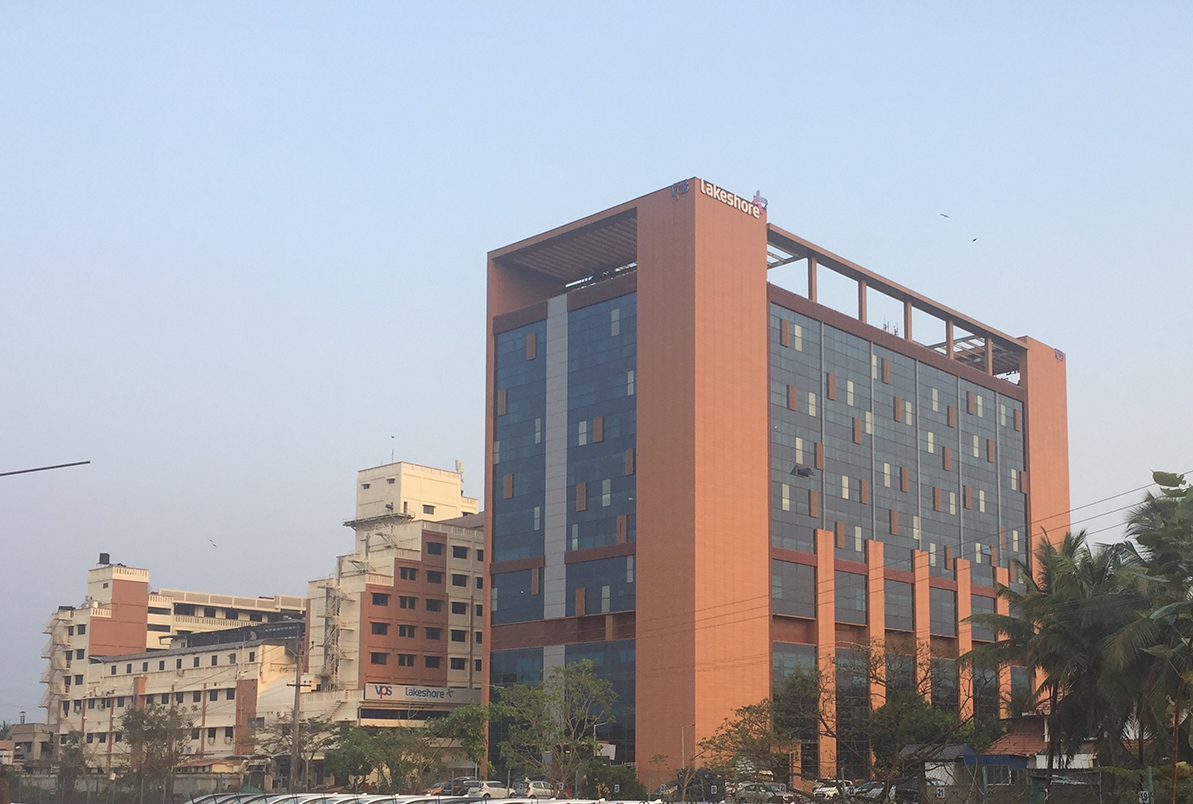

Geography
- Location: Nettoor, Kochi, Kerala, India
- Coordinates: 9.919089°N 76.319084°E

Organisation
- Care system: Tertiary
- Type: General
- Affiliated university: National Accreditation Board for Hospitals and Healthcare Providers (NABH)
- Patron: Shamsheer Vayalil
- Network: VPS Healthcare

Services
- Beds: 650

Helipads
- Helipad: Yes

History
- Opened: 2003

Links
- Website: www.vpslakeshorehospital.com
- Lists: Hospitals in India

VPS Lakeshore Hospital, also known as Lakeshore Hospital, is a multi super-speciality hospital in Kochi, Kerala, India. It is located along National Highway 66 in Nettoor, and is a 470-bedded facility with over 30 clinical departments. The hospital is headed by Shamsheer Vayalil, the founder and managing director of VPS Healthcare.

== Profile ==
VPS Lakeshore Hospital and Research Centre Ltd was founded by Dr.Philip Augustine in 1996 and started functioning as a multi-specialty hospital in January 2003. The hospital is accredited by the National Accreditation Board for Hospitals & Healthcare Providers (NABH) and has 43 intensive care units and 10 operation theatres. It is one of the largest tertiary care hospital in the state and is managed by VPS Healthcare, which took over the management from Philip Augustine in April 2016. It has air, water and surface ambulance services which was listed by the Limca Book of Records in 2004. Besides medical care, it also conducts several post graduate programs accredited by the Diplomate of National Board.

The second phase expansion of its facilities by adding 200,000 sq. ft. to house oncology, cardiology and gastroenterology departments are under development. The first pediatric bone marrow transplant, the first liver transplant and the first liver dialysis in Kerala and the first insulin pump insertion in South India are some of the reported achievements of the hospital. The new structure is supposedly open to public by mid 2018.

== Controversies ==
=== Organ donation scandal ===
In June 2023, Ernakulam court issued criminal charges against Lakeshore Hospital and its eight associated doctors. The charges in question involve an 18-year-old male patient who was declared brain dead in 2009 and whose organs were donated to a foreign recipient without following the proper procedures. The criminal case alleges that the hospital failed to administer the necessary treatment for blood clotting, which was essential in this particular situation to save the patient.

== Awards and achievements ==
- VPS Lakeshore's 'HEART', which is a replica of the same organ was awarded the Guinness World Record for the Largest Model of a Human Organ. The structure which is 31.81 ft tall and 22.88 ft wide was installed at the top of its new hospital block.
