= Crowne Plaza Kochi =

Hotel in Kochi, India

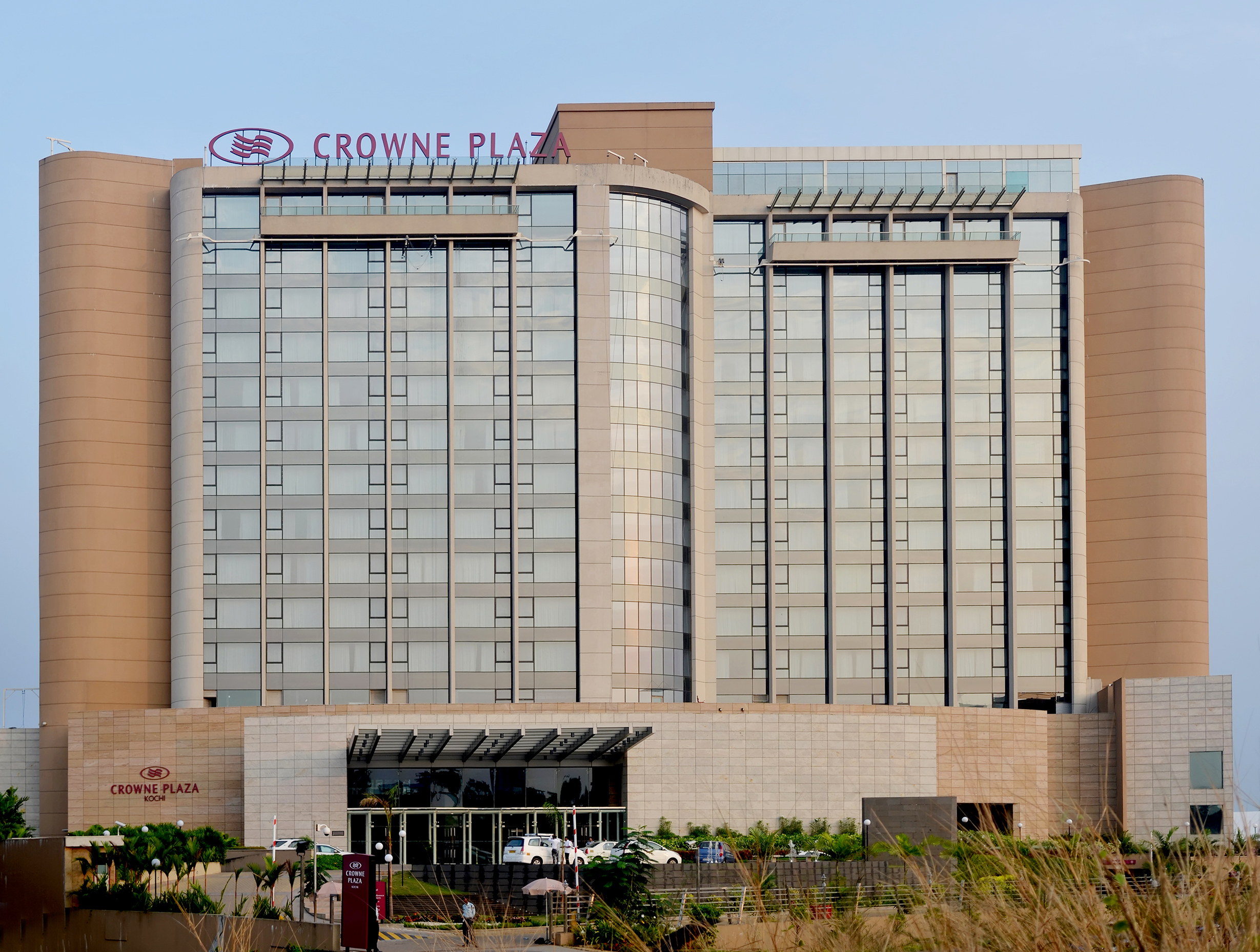
- Crowne Plaza Kochi in 2014
- Hotel chain: Crowne Plaza

General information
- Classification: 5 stars
- Location: Kundannoor, Kochi, Kerala, India
- Coordinates: 9.9340°N 76.3189°E
- Opening: January 2013
- Owner: KGA Group
- Operator: IHG Hotels & Resorts

Design and construction
- Architect: Edifice Consultants

Other information
- Number of rooms: 269
- Number of suites: 14

Crowne Plaza Kochi is a luxury five-star hotel in the city of Kochi, in India. Owned by KGA Group, the waterfront property is situated on the National Highway near to Kundannoor. The hotel opened in 2013 consists of 269 rooms including 14 suites. Managed by IHG Hotels & Resorts, it is a part of their Crowne Plaza hotel chain and is the sixth property from the brand to open in the south-west Asia region.

== Overview ==
The construction of the Crowne Plaza Kochi began in 2008 was completed by late 2012. It was inaugurated in January 2013. The hotel features two outdoor swimming pools, spa, a salon, a 24-hour fitness centre, and multiple dining and event spaces. It also has a backwater pavilion of 14000 sq ft capable of accommodating up to 2000 guests.

== See also ==
- IHG Hotels & Resorts
- Crowne Plaza
- Tourism in Kerala
