= National Highway 966B (India) =

National highway in India

National Highway 966B
- Map of National Highway 966B in red

Route information
- Length: 8 km (5.0 mi)

Major junctions
- From: Kundannoor, Kochi, Kerala
- To: Willingdon Island, Kochi, Kerala

Location
- Country: India
- States: Kerala
- Primary destinations: Kochi – Willingdon Island

Highway system
- Roads in India; Expressways; National; State; Asian
← NH 544	→ NH 66

National Highway 966B, also known as NH 966B, is part of India's National Highway network. Its old name was NH 47A. It covers a distance of 8 kilometres (5.0 miles) between Kundannoor and Willingdon Island in Kochi, in the state of Kerala. It starts from the junction of NH 66 at Kundannoor.

== See also ==
- List of national highways in India
- List of national highways in India by state
- National Highways Development Project
