= Vyttila =

- Ward
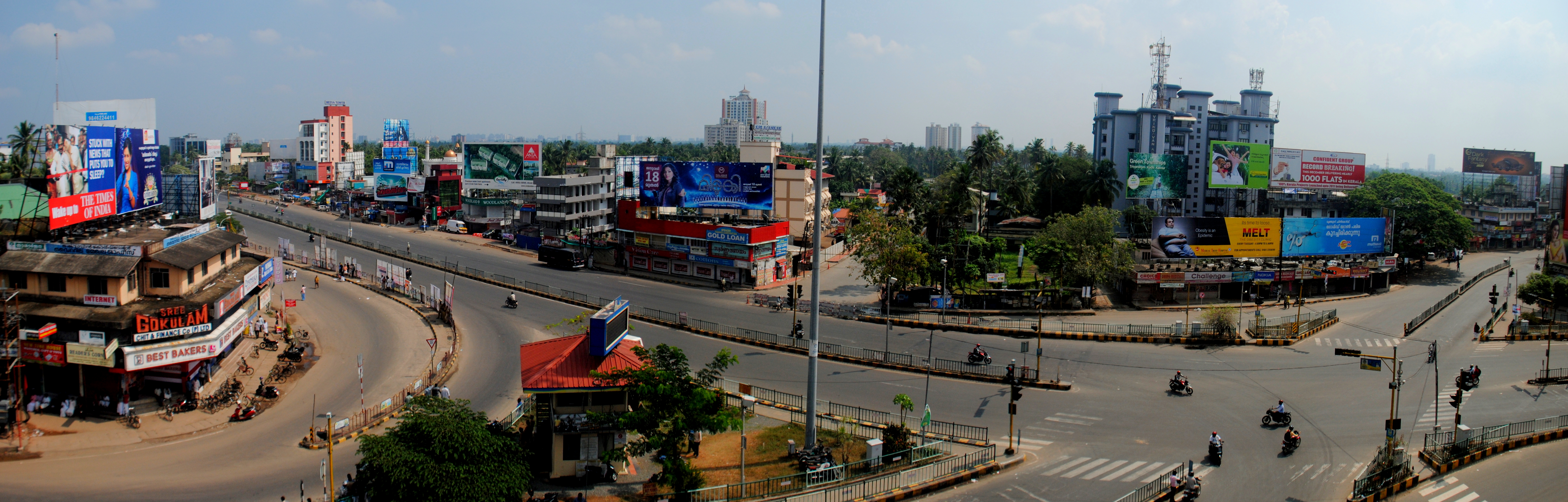
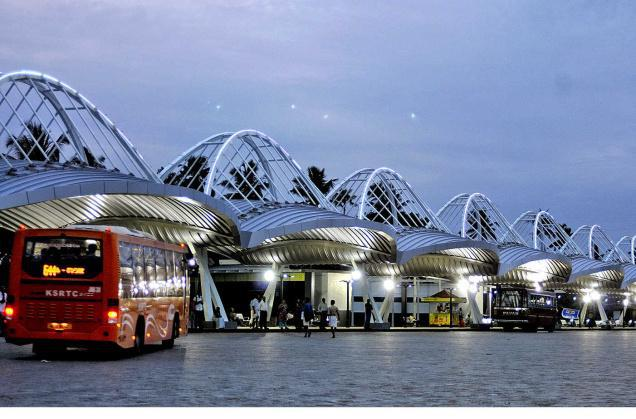
- 1. Vyttila Junction (2013)- before the subsequent redevelopment plan and construction of the Kochi Metro 2.Vyttila Mobility Hub
- Interactive map of Vyttila
- Coordinates: 9.969°N 76.318°E
- Country: India
- State: Kerala
- District: Ernakulam

Languages
  - Official: Malayalam, English
- Time zone: UTC+5:30 (IST)

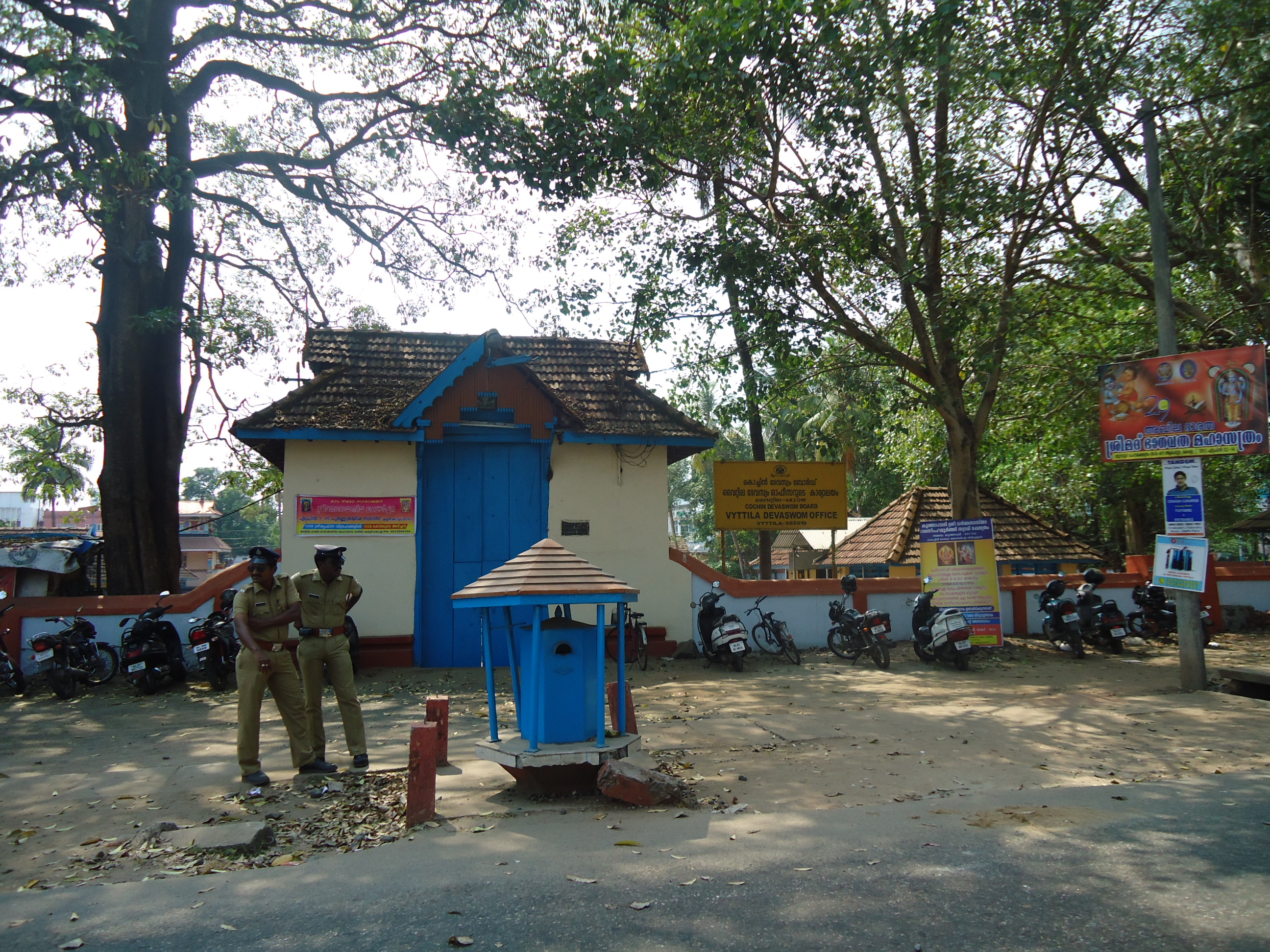
Temple office

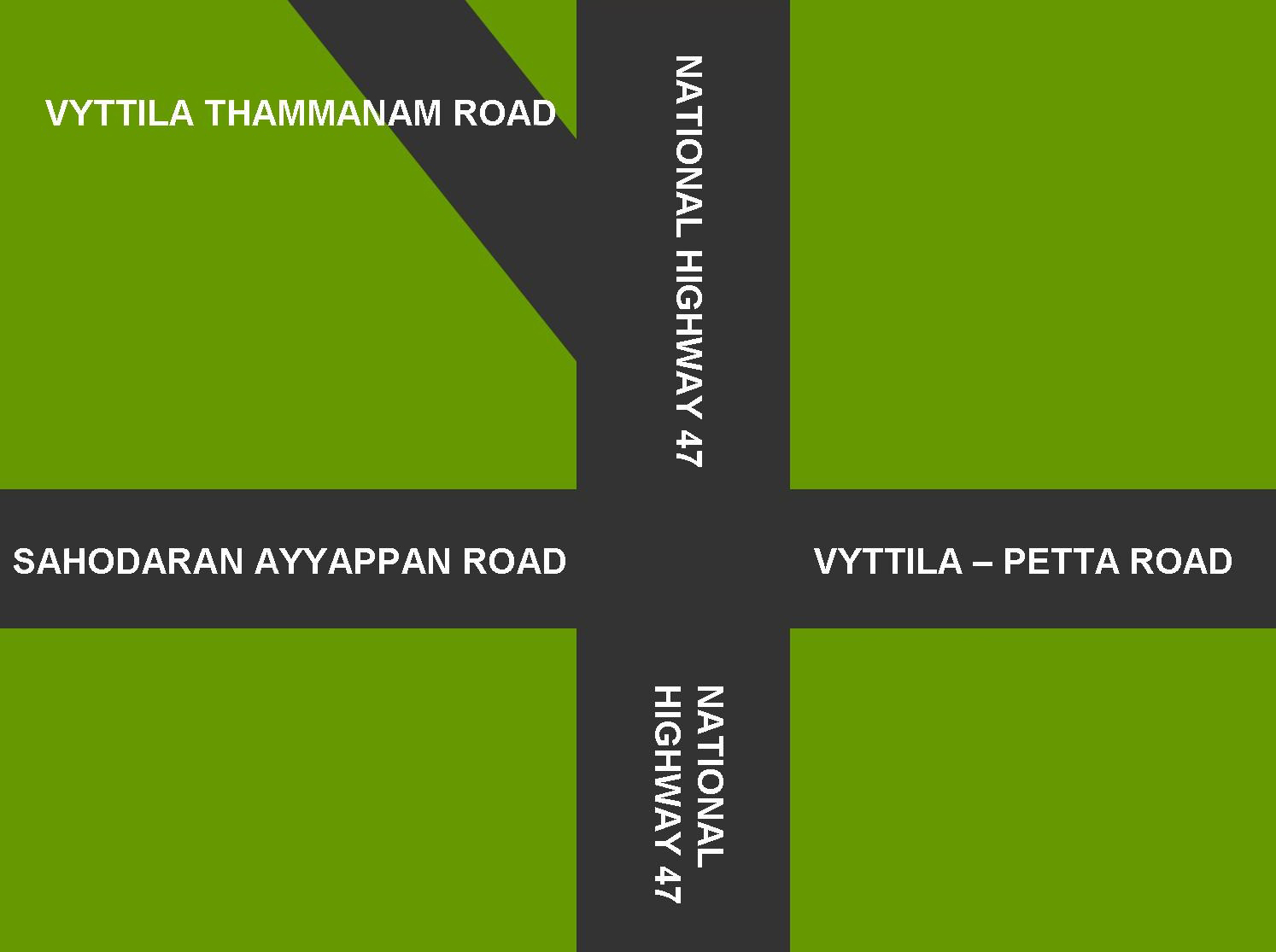
Vyttila is one of the most prominent junctions of Kerala state

Vyttila, IPA: [ʋɐjt̺ːilɐ], is a region in the city of Kochi, Kerala. It is a prominent area located in southern Kochi. The Vyttila junction is the busiest as well as the largest intersection in Kerala. This node intersects the main north–south artery of the state of Kerala, namely, the Kochi Bypass, with three city roads of Kochi viz, the S. A. Road (One of the city's most prominent arterial road in the east–west direction), the Vyttila-Petta Road, and the Thammanam Road.

The name Vyttila is said to be evolved from the word "Vayal Thala" meaning the main part of the paddy field. Once the area including Elamkulam, were paddy fields and paddy cultivation were the main sources of income. The paddy field existed from Ernakulam, Girinagar, Panampilly Nagar, Gandhi Nagar, Jawahar Nagar, Kumarananshan Nagar and extended to Kaniyampuzha and Panamkutyy bridge. Some also say that because there existed a bunch of dacoits, who murdered and looted the travelers the name evolved from 'Vazhithala'. Once the Puthenpalam bridge that connected Chilavennoor Lake and Chettichira was the only link from Vayalthala with Ernakulam.

Vyttila hosts the Vyttilla Mobility Hub, which converges different ways of surface transport (namely, local as well as long-distance buses, rail, Metro Rail and inland water transport) to the city onto a single node.

Vyttila is also the name of the region in the city of Kochi, of which the Vyttila Intersection is a part. Until 1967, Vyttila was a panchayat. The November 1967 order of the Kerala Legislative Assembly amalgamated Vyttila to the newly formed Kochi Corporation.

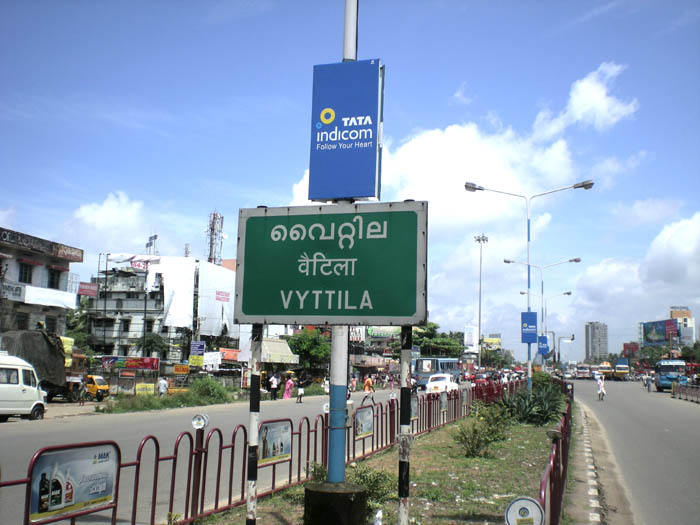
Vyttila approaching

== Vyttila Mobility Hub ==
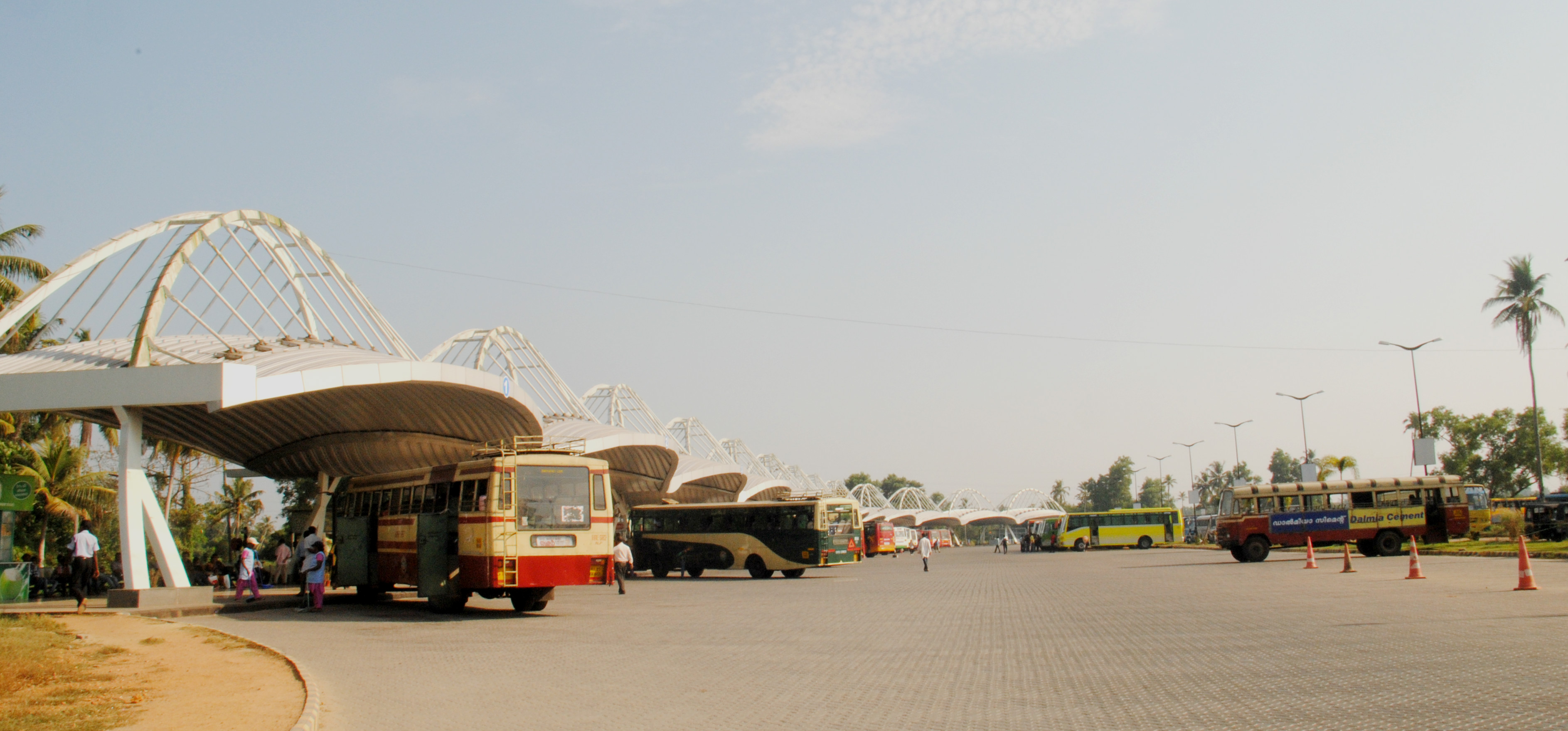
A view of Vyttila Mobility Hub

Vyttila is home for the Vyttila Mobility Hub, which converges different modes of surface transport (namely, local as well as long-distance buses, rail, Metro Rail and inland water transport) to the city of Kochi onto a single node. Phase-1 of the project consists of a Bus Terminal with 13 bus bays, each of which can park 5 buses. Thus, when Phase-1 is completed, the terminal can handle as many as 65 buses at a time. Part of the proposed Phase-1 was commissioned on 26 February 2011. well before completion of the phase, owing to a political decision to inaugurate the terminal before declaration of the State Election which is anticipated on 1 March 2011. What was so far was commissioned consists of 4 of the proposed 13 bus bays. 3 more bus bays are presently under construction. The mobility hub is located north-east of the Vyttila Intersection, in the area between Kaniyampuzha Road and Poonithura Village Office. Vyttila is the node of the city that connects it to the neighbouring districts viz, Thrissur, Alappuzha, Kottayam and Idukki.

== Kochi Bypass ==
The Aroor-Edapally streatch of the National Highway 66, even though built a couple of decades back, as a highway, to by-pass the city of Kochi, has now become a busy city road, necessitating the construction of a newer by-pass, a little more eastward to the city (which is already proposed in the Kochi Master Plan).

The Vytilla Junction on the bypass is the biggest and busiest road intersection in the state. It connects the district headquarters of Kottayam, Alleppey etc. to the Kochi city centre. Vyttila flyover was opened in 2021.

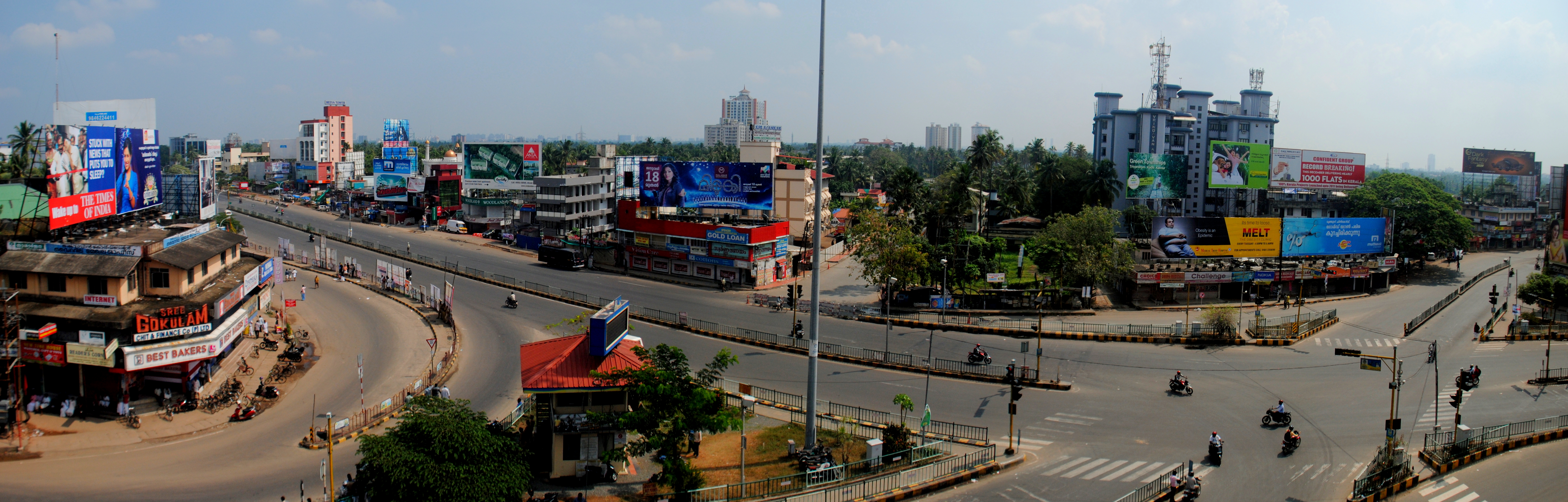
Vyttila Junction - A harthal day view-

== Health and education ==
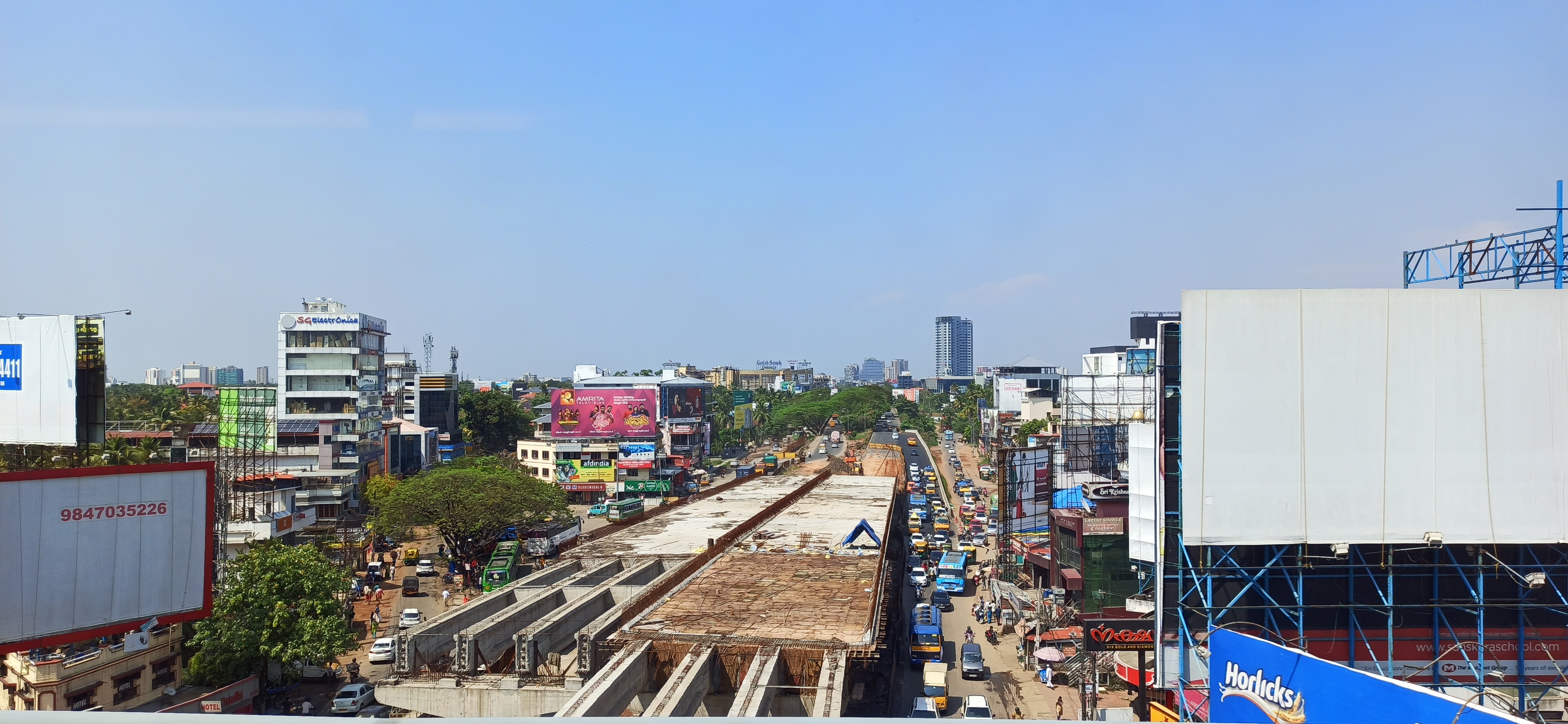
Under construction Vyttila Flyover

Vyttila is home to hospitals like the Welcare Hospital and the Mother & Child Hospital. Toc H Public School, St. Rita's H.S Ponnurunni, C.K.C.L.P.S are schools located in Vyttila.

=== Schools ===
Vyttila hosts the following schools:

- Toc H Public School
- C.K.C Girls High School, Ponnurunni
- St. Rita's High School, Ponnurunni
- Nalanda Public School Thammanam

== Foreign language colleges ==
- Traum Academy for German & French languages
- menon

== Places of worship ==
- Sree Narayaneshwaram Temple, Ponnurunni
- Kavalampillil Neelingattu Bagavathy Temple
- Vytilla Siva Subramonia Temple
- Ayyampillikavu Devi Temple
- Kavalampilly Dharma Daiva Temple, Junior Janatha Road
- St. Patrick's Church, Vyttila
- St. Raphael's Church, Thykkodam
- St. Gregorios Orthodox Syrian Church, Shine Road, Vyttila
- Our Lady of Health Church, Chalikkavattom
- St. Joseph's Shrine, Major Road
- Sharon Fellowship Church, Opp. K.S.E.B Off., Vyttila.
- Sharon Fellowship Church, Thykoodam. .
- Ignatious Noorono Jacobite Church, Ponnurunni
- Chalikavattom Juma Masjid
- Juma Masjid Eroor
- Salafi Masjid, Vyttila

== Adjacent regions ==
Janatha, Power-house, Thykoodam, Kaniampuzha, and Ponnurunni are all located in close proximity to Vyttila. Vyttila is now more of a commercial location. However the area surrounding the junction are still thickly populated.

The roads and lanes on either side of S.A. Road and the NH are filled with residential buildings. There are residents associations for each area in Vyttila. The Vyttila Residents Welfare Association is prominent among them. The association which is based at Maplachery Road, covers the entire south-west area from Vyttila junction with Maplachery Road and Bank Road as its borders.
