= History and culture of Thrippunithura =

There are many stories that describe the origin of the word Thripunithura. Some latter day Sanskrit enthusiasts ascribe the origin of the name to "Poorna Veda Puri" - the town of Vedas in its entirety. Another possible origin to name comes from the meaning "the land on the shores of Poorna river".

Other stories play on the pun of "Pooni" or "Pooneeram", which means quiver. One of the stories tells about Arjuna, one of the Pandavas, once visited Lord Vishnu, and was given an idol, which Arjuna carried in his "pooni" (quiver). While searching for a place to install it, he met Lord Ganapati and sought help. Ganapati found this place and the idol was installed. Another story of the same variety is as follows. At the end of Dvapara Yuga, the period of Lord Krishna, the Lord himself presented an idol to Arjuna, one of the Pandavas, and asked him to install it in a proper place. He kept the idol in a bag used to keep arrows, which was called Pooneeram in local language. When he reached the place, he shouted Pooneeram Thura means 'open the bag' in local language. Thus the name Poonithura has come, according to this story.

When the Kings of erstwhile cochin Dynasty made this place their capital, the area where the palaces and the fort are constructed came to known as Thiru Poonithura as the word "Thiru" shows respect. It became Thripunithura

== Bigger Temples ==
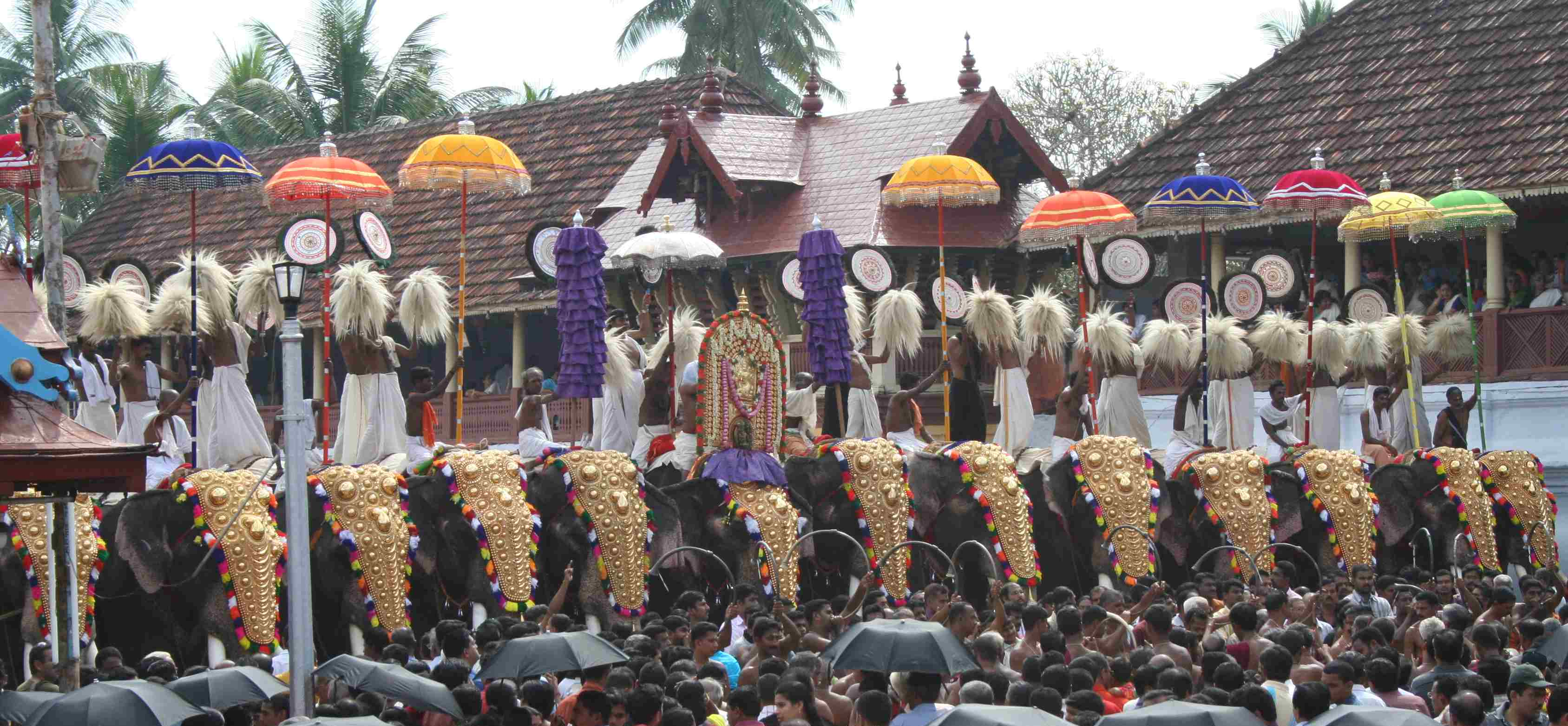
Caparisoned elephants during Sree Poornathrayesa temple

=== Sree Poornathrayesa Temple ===
Thripunithura is also known as the Land of temples. The famous Sree Poornathrayesa temple is one of the famous temples in our India.Sree Poornathrayeesa, the deity of Poornathrayeesa temple, is in the form of "Santhana Gopala Moorthy" as told in the Bhagavatha. It is believed those worship him truly, will be blessed with children.It is also believed that the temple Thantri's family, (belonging to puliyannoor mana) is the next generations of the Brahmana of the Santhana Gopalam story.

=== Thamaramkulangara Sree Dharma Sastha temple ===
Thamaramkulangara Sree Dharma Sastha temple is among the most prominent temples in Tripunithura. The deity is Lord Ayyapa in the form of Dharmasastha. According to anecdotes Lord Dharma Sastha of Chamravattom (in Malappuram District) followed one of his Priests from Morakkala Mana who had shifted to Tripunithura. Lord Sastha assumed the form of a lizard and came with the priest comfortably by sitting on his traditional umbrella made up of palm leaves. Though the temple is owned by Uranma Devaswom Board, almost all the affairs are managed by Thamaramkulangara Ayyappa Seva Samithy (TASS), a voluntary organization led by local people. The main festival of the temple is 5 day 'Makaravilaku' festival culminating on Makar Sankranthi in Zodiac calendar (around 15 January).

=== Muthukulangara Temple ===
The main deity in Muthukulangara Santhana Gopala Sree Krishna Swami Temple is Maha Vishnu in the form of Santhana Gopala. It is situated in Eroor. There is a legend behind the temple which makes it more special to married women who want nice babies. It is said that wife of a Brahmin at Puliyannur Illam in Thripunithura, was not lucky enough to have a live baby. Whenever she delivered, the child will die. The Brahmin prayed to Arjuna the great warrior of 'pancha-pandavas' to save his 10th child. Arjuna promised him to save the child. Even in the presence of Arjuna, the child vanished after the birth. Arjuna tried to trace the way child vanished and they both, the Brahmin and Arjuna went to Vaikundam the place of Lord Vishnu. There they saw Bhagawan and Lakshmidevi surrounded by the deceased ten babies of the Brahmin. Vishnu handed over two idols and the babies to Arjuna. The place where they get down is known as Muthukulangara and Arjuna placed one idol at the point they landed and later that was realised as Muthukulengara Santhanagopla Khsetram. This is one of the famous temples with daily " Thanthri Pooja".

=== Poonithura Sree Subrahmanya Swami Temple ===
The main deity in SREE SUBRAHMANYAN(BALA MURUKAN) and other upa devathas in the Nalambalam are Sree Ganapathy, Sree Bhadrakali and Nagaraja-Nagayakshi and Hidumban also there. Location of the Temple is at Poonithura near Gandhi Square, Jawahar Road.

== List of other temples ==
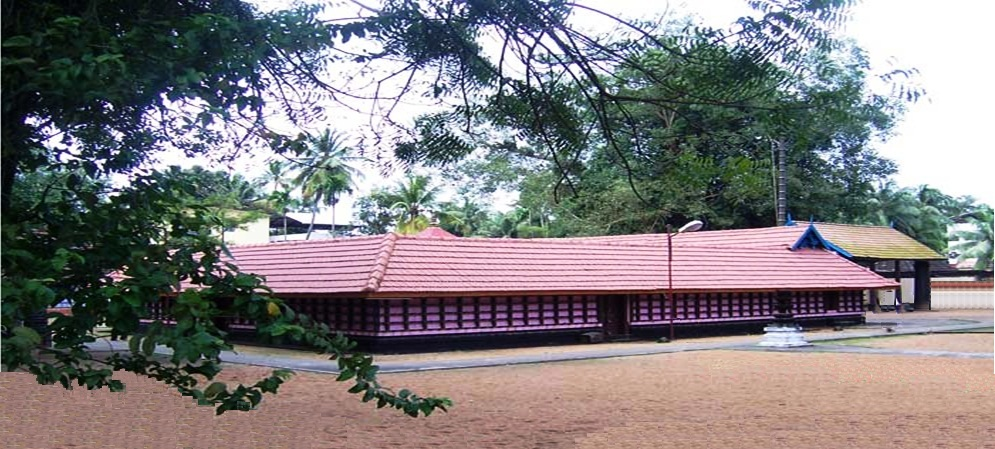
Chakkamkulangara Temple

- Pishari Kovil Temple(Shariyil Temple)
- Kannankulangara Temple
- Kannanthrikovil Temple
- Kannankulagara sri balavinayaka temple
- Kodankulangara Temple
- Chakkamkulangara Siva Temple
- Ayani Temple
- Airettil Temple
- Pavamkulangara Temple
- Tharmekkavu Temple
- Thevarakkavu Temple
- Anthimahakalan Temple
- puthankulangara siva temple
- Adampillykavu Temple
- Palliparambukavu Temple
- Maramkulangara Krishna Temple
- Puthiyakavu Bhagawati Temple
- Nadakkavu Temple
- Muthukulangara Temple
- Sree Rama Temple
- Mukkottil Devi Temple
- Poonithura Sree Subrahmanya Swami Temple
- Poonithura Kottaram Sree Krishna Temple
- Thammandi Temple
- Pottayil Temple
- Mathoor Baghavathy Temple
- Thuruthy Baghavathy Temple
- Sree Bhuvaneswary Temple
- Mutturuthy Baghavathy Temple

== Churches ==
Thrippunithura is said to be having the presence of Christian faithful belonging to the Syrian Christian tradition from ancient times. Saint Mary's Jacobite Syrian Church (Nadamel Pally) is the oldest Christian Church in Thrippunithura. The Church was established in A.D. 1175. It is believed that a prominent Landlord of the region, namely Valamthuruthy Bhattathirippad donated a huge stretch of land to the local Christian families for the purpose building a Church. The Church came to be known as Nadamel Church as it was required to climb stairs (Nada in Malayalam) to reach the building. Following the arrival of European stream of Christianity, professed by the Portuguese, a split occurred in the parish and resulted in the formation of Saint Mary's Forane Church. Many other prominent Churches stand in the peripherals of Thrippunithura town. This includes St. George's Jacobite Cathedral (Karingachira Church Pally), St. Mary's Forane Church and many other churches. Thrippunithura is also divine with mosques including one adjacent to the Municipal Market complex and in Pettah.

== History ==
The 'Raja nagari' or the royal city is one of the most prominent centers of traditional Kerala cultural heritage. The erstwhile rulers of Kingdom of Cochin were great patrons of art. This made fine arts and architecture flourish under them in many ways. The town is also a prominent centre of learning for classical arts like Carnatic music, Kathakali and Mohiniyattam besides percussion instruments like mridangam, chenda and maddalam. Much of this is facilitated by the RLV College of Music and Institute of Fine Arts was established here in 1956. Another center of learning is Kalmandalam. Tripunithura also has many dedicated centers for stage performances and promotion of art.

The Kalikotta Palace, adjacent to the Sree Poornathrayesa Temple is an important cultural focal point for this small town with many eastern classical musical programs being conducted on the premises.

The culture and many aspects of daily life of a typical person here is intrinsically bound to temples and surroundings. In the current 'modern' age fine arts and art forms are still promoted and sustained by temples in and around Tripunithura.

Tripunithura is the place where the legendary artiste couple of Kathakali maestro Kalamandalam Krishnan Nair and Mohiniyattam doyenne Kalamandalam Kalyanikutty Amma lived for long. kJ Yesudas is another famous artist who learned music in Tripunithura.

Tripunithura is also a prominent center of Ayurveda. One of the three Ayurveda colleges in Kerala is located at Puthiyakaavu near Tripunithura town. It also has attached hospital to it. One of the famous celebration "Atha Chamayam" takes place in this town during Onam festival.

== History of Poornathrayesa Temple ==
According to local folklore, it is said that Arjuna and Krishna requested Lord Ganesha to go ahead of them and select an appropriate place for the idol to be consecrated. Lord Ganesha travelled far and wide and finally reached a divine place which was the seat of the Vedas in its entirety[3] known as 'Poorna Veda Puri' which later became Tripunithura. Lord Ganesha was so pleased with the place that He chose a holy spot and seated there Himself. When Arjuna reached Tripunithura, he saw that Lord Ganesha has seated himself down in the place where he was to keep Lord Vishnu's idol. He requested Lord Ganesha to kindly move from there so that he may install the idol there. Lord Ganesha said that He could not move from there. As he could not place the idol anywhere on the ground other than at the appointed spot, Arjuna had no other choice and it is said that he gave Lord Ganesha a kick which caused Lord Ganesha to turn southwards and placed the idol there. The Poornathrayesa Temple is the only temple where Lord Ganesha faces southwards. All other temples traditionally have the idols facing the east and/or the west. This temple grew into the beautiful and magnificent Sree Poornathrayesa Temple we see today.
