= Aaraattu =

Indian ritual

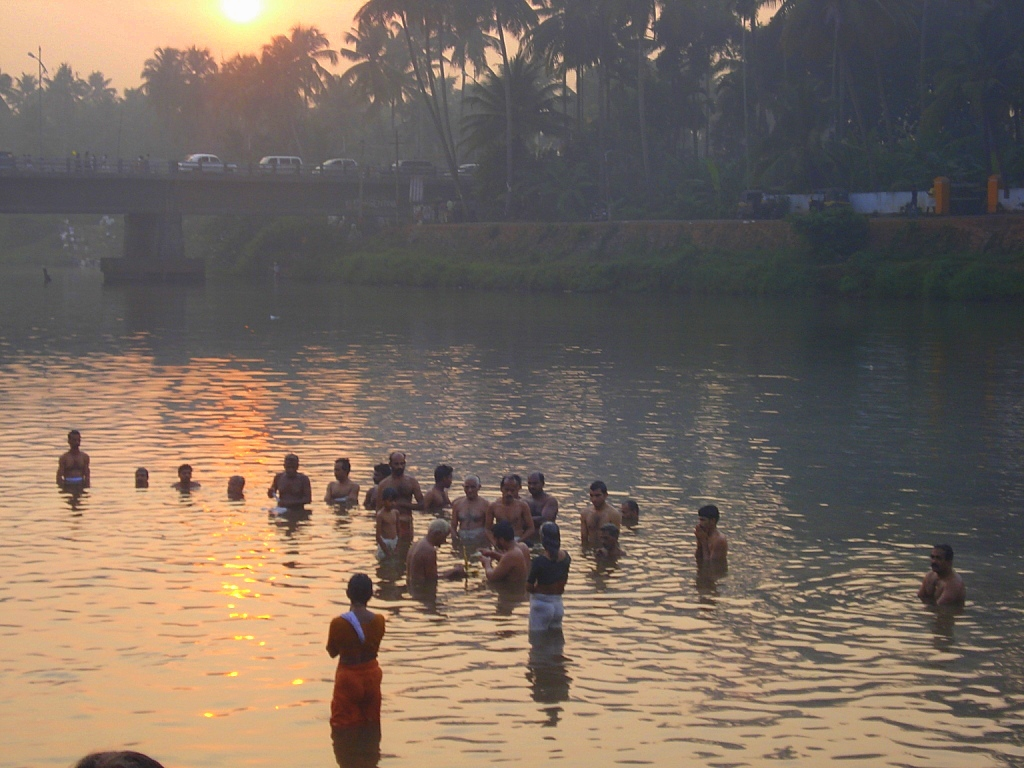
Ārāttu at Arattupuzha Pooram

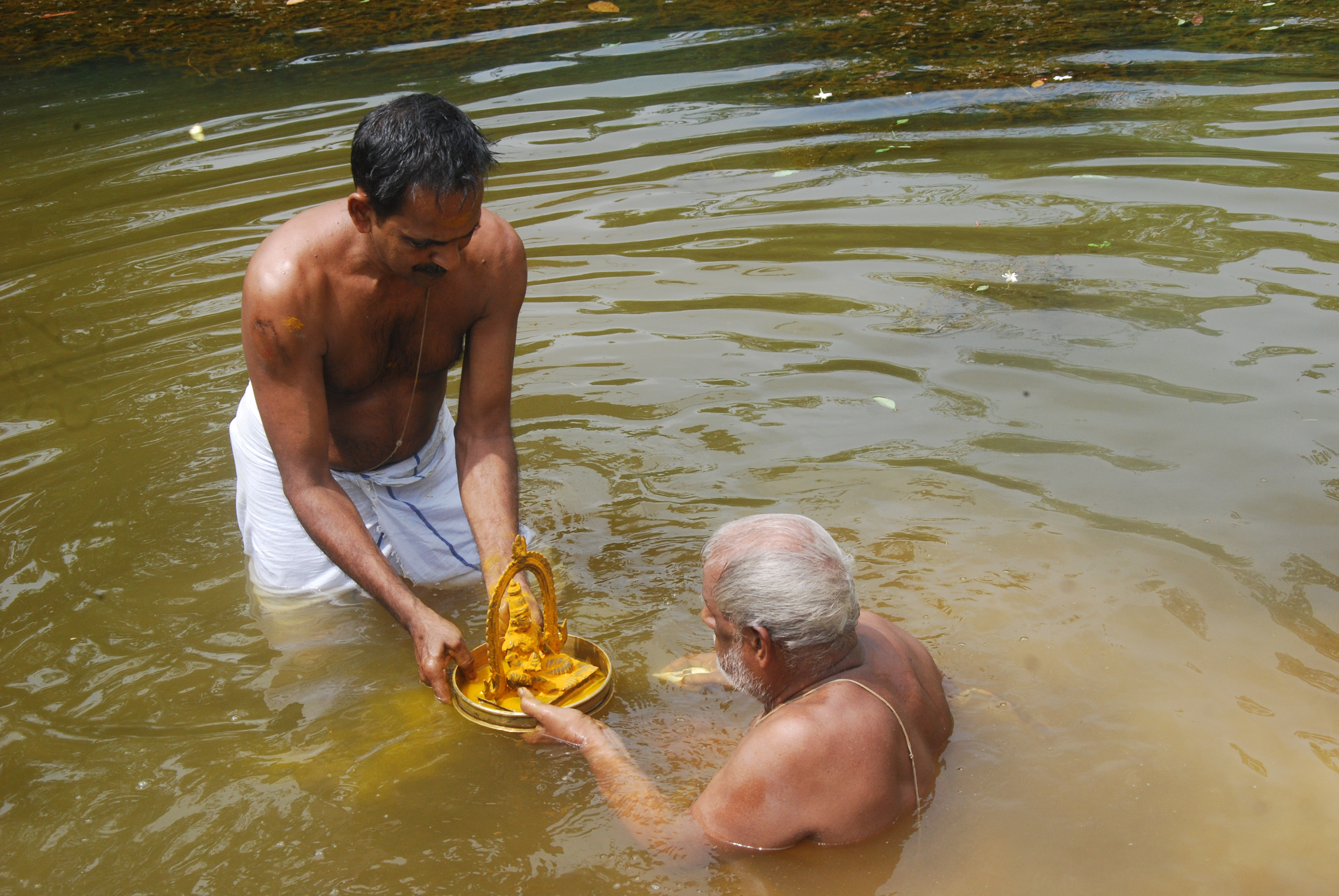
Bathing the idol at an ārāttu

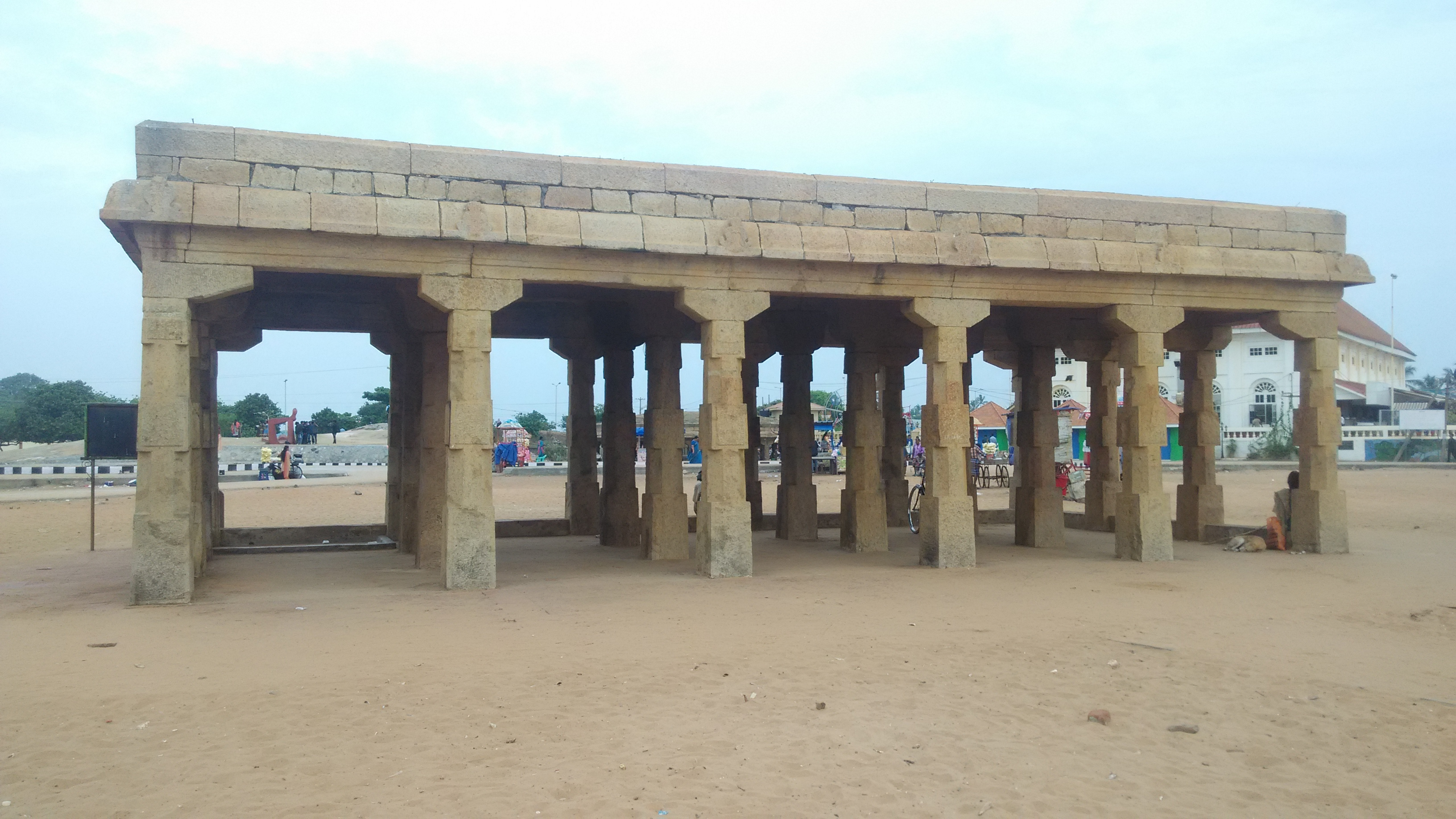
An ārāttu mandapam at Shankumugham Beach

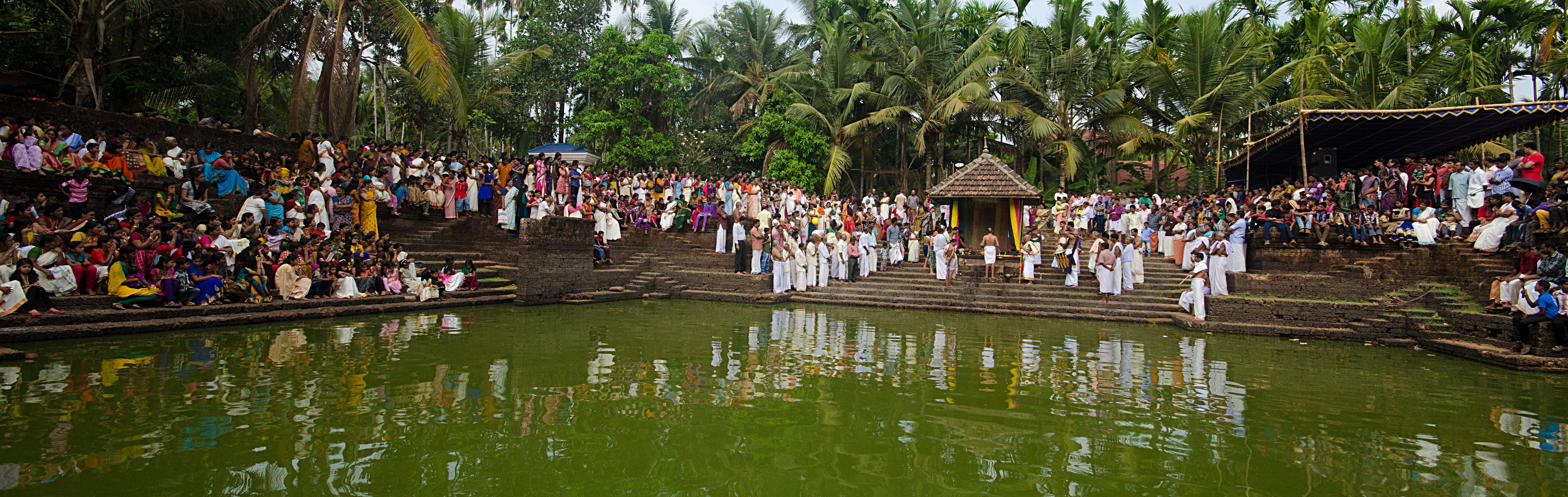
Ārāttu at temple tank of Veerabhadra temple, Kasaragod

Ārāttu (pronounced [aːraːʈʈə]) is an annual ritual performed during Hindu temple festivals in Kerala, India, in which a priest bathe the idol of a deity by dipping it in a river or a temple tank. It is mainly carried out at the end of a temple festival. Ārāttu is celebrated twice annually—the spring festival (March - April) and the autumn festival (October - November). A festival normally lasts 10 days.

== Major festivals ==
One of the important Arattu in Kerala is conducted at Padmanabhaswamy Temple, Thiruvananthapuram by Travancore royal family, procession is carried out to Shankumugham Beach for the ceremony. The operations at the Trivandrum International Airport stops twice a year for the procession to pass through the runway to the Shankumugham Beach. At Ambalappuzha Sree Krishna Swamy Temple, the festival starts with a flag hoisting, after bathing the deities, ambalappuzha palpayasam (a sweet pudding) is offered to the gods. The eight-day long festival at Sree Poornathrayeesa Temple, Thrippunithura is concluded with an aaraattu.

== In popular culture ==
A 1979 Malayalam film directed by I. V. Sasi was titled Aarattu, and a 2021 film directed by B. Unnikrishnan also use the same title, both the films are otherwise unrelated to the ritual.

== See also ==
- Brahmotsavam
- Padmanabhaswamy Temple
- Travancore royal family
