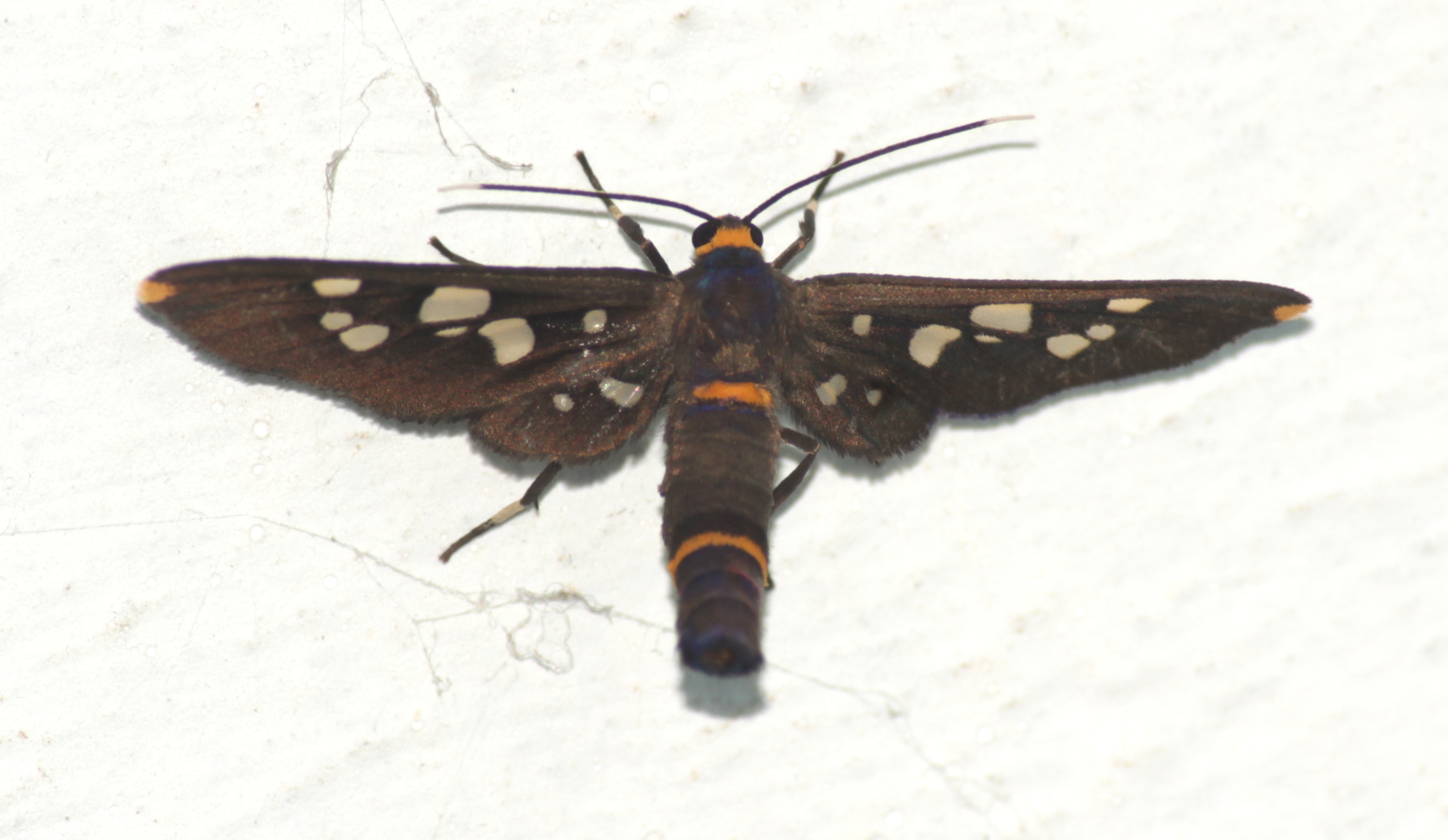
- In Thrippunithura, Kerala, India

Scientific classification
- Kingdom: Animalia
- Phylum: Arthropoda
- Clade: Pancrustacea
- Class: Insecta
- Order: Lepidoptera
- Superfamily: Noctuoidea
- Family: Erebidae
- Subfamily: Arctiinae
- Genus: Amata
- Species: A. cyssea

Binomial name
- Amata cyssea Stoll, 1782

Synonyms
- Sphinx cysseus Stoll, [1782]; Zygaena collaris Fabricius, 1793; Syntomis schoenerrhi Boisduval, 1829; Syntomis cuprea Prittwitz, 1867; Syntomis georgina Butler, 1876; Syntomis cysseoides Butler, 1876

= Amata cyssea =

Species of moth

Amata cyssea, the handmaiden moth, is a moth of the subfamily Arctiinae. It was described by Caspar Stoll in 1782. It is found on the Indian subcontinent and Sri Lanka.

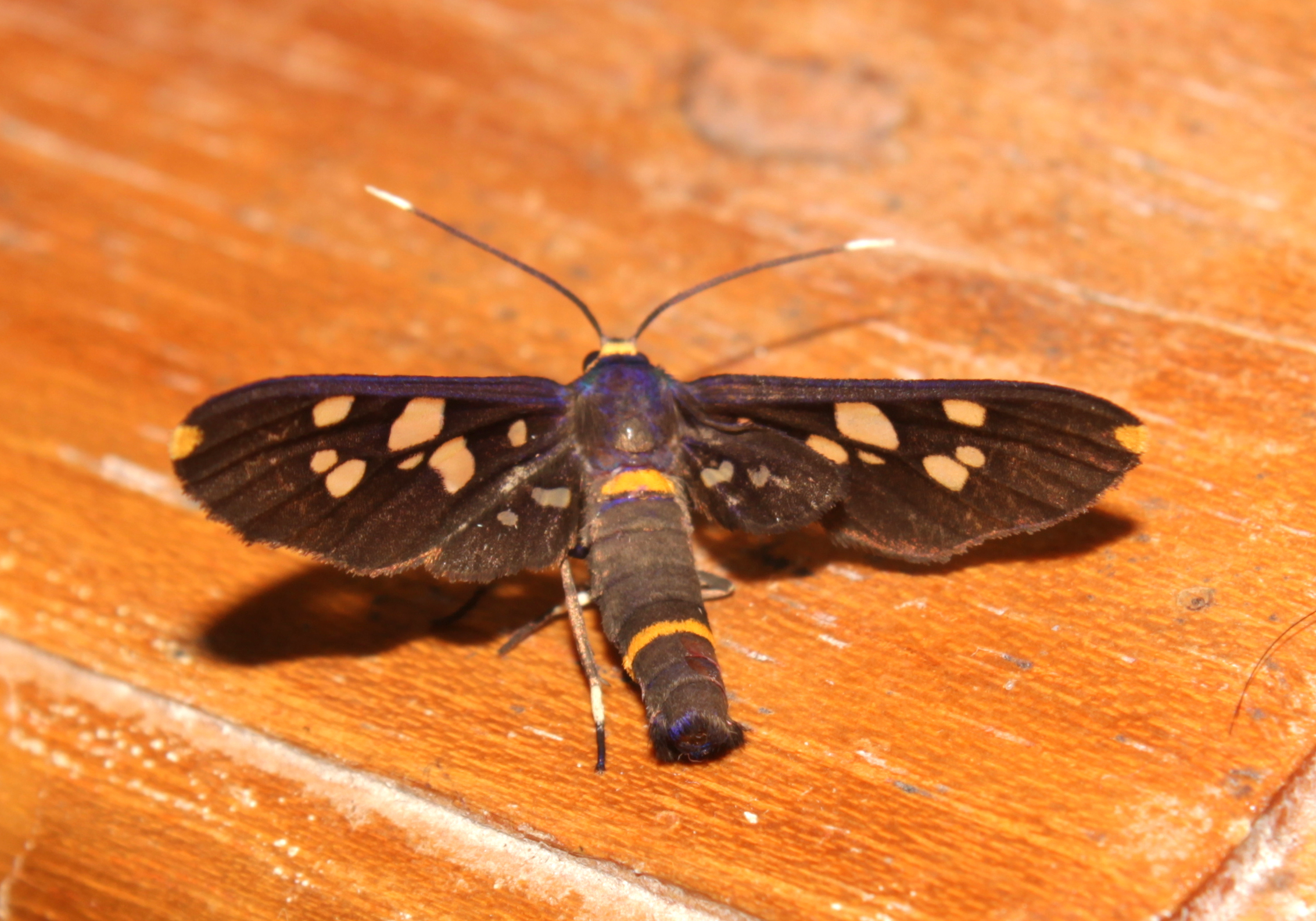
In Thrippunithura, Kerala, India
