= Eroor =

- Suburb
- Location in Kerala, India Eroor (India)
- Coordinates: 9.972°N 76.337°E
- Country: India
- State: Kerala
- District: Ernakulam

Population (2011)
  - Total: 20,640

Languages
  - Official: Malayalam, English
- Time zone: UTC+5:30 (IST)
- PIN: 682306
- Vehicle registration: KL-39
- Nearest city: Kochi

Eroor is a suburb of the city of Kochi in the state of Kerala, India. It is located at around 7 km from the city center. It is a part of Thrippunithura Municipality.

== Temples ==
- Sree Puthankulangara Siva Temple, Kappattikavu, Eroor North: Puthenkulangara Shiva Temple of Eroor is known for its green surroundings and garden, which contains dozens of flowers and fruit trees.
- Maramkulangara Sreekrishna Temple, Eroor North, Eroor
- Pishari Kovil Bhagavathi Temple, Eroor South, Eroor

== Demographics ==
As of the 2011 India census, Eroor had a population of 20,640 with 9,600 males and 11,040 females.
