= Maramkulangara Krishna Temple =

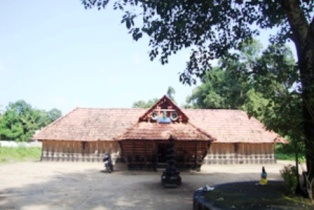
- the entrance of temple

Religion
- Affiliation: Hinduism
- District: Palarivattom, Thrippunithura and Vyttila
- Deity: Lord Bala Krishna or Krishna

Location
- Location: Vennala - Eroor route
- State: Kerala
- Country: India

Maramkulangara Krishna Temple is an Indian Krishna temple situated at Eroor. It is along Vennala to Eroor route, Kerala, India. This is an Abhimana temple of Lord Vishnu is accessible by road from Palarivattom, Thrippunithura and Vyttila. The principal deity here is Bala Krishna or Krishna in his child form. This Bala Krishna is termed by natives as "Child Specialist".

== Legend ==
The purpose of Krishna's incarnation was to kill Kamsa. And the time for Kamsa to kill Krishna. Poothana was breastfed Krishna with deadly poison in Places.but Lord Bala Krishna Pulled up to Poothana's soul. Thus it is said that Poothana got salvation.Lord Vishnu appeared before Yashoda, who began to cry on suspicion of poisoning the child's body, and poured nectar on the child from the well. That is how the temple got its name, maramkulangara, which means 'the one who killed the woman who came to kill'.The water from this well is used to bathe the babies.

== History ==
Elamprakkodathu Mana, an ancient Namboodiri family which was landlord of the area, had the "Oorazhma" (ownership) of a lot of temples around including the Sree Poornathrayesa Temple and Pishari Kovil Bhagavathi Temple. Maramkulangara Krishna temple also was built by them.

== Deities ==
The deities from this temple are

- Ganapathy
- Ayyappan
- Nagas

== Speciality ==
The deity is Bala Krishna who is believed to provide protection to small children from evil birds (Pakshipeeda). Children are brought to this temple for getting the grace even before "Choroonu" (ritual of giving rice food for the first time). the children are given a bath in front of the temple with the holy water (theertham. without wiping, they are let to dry naturally and brought inside for Darsan.
