= Iron Bridge (Thrippunithura) =

Bridge in Kerala, India

Iron Bridge ഇരുമ്പ് പാലം
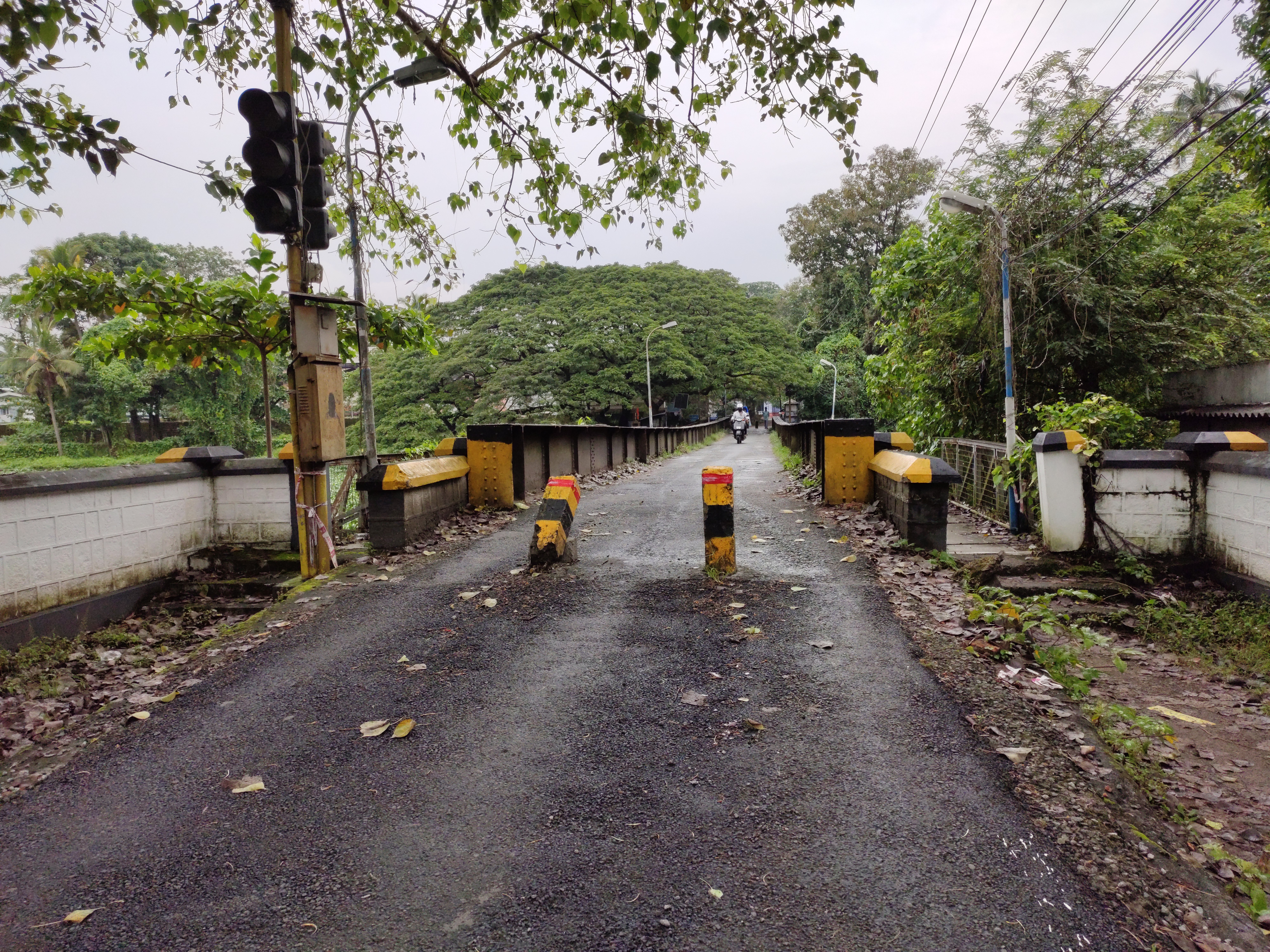
- Entry to the bridge
- Coordinates: 9°56′42″N 76°20′25″E
- Locale: Thrippunithura, Ernakulam Kerala, India
- Other name: Irumbu Palam

Characteristics
- Material: Cast iron

History
- Constructed by: Westwood Bailey Engineering Construction
- Opened: 1890

Location
- Interactive map of Iron Bridge

Irumbu Palam (Iron Bridge) in Thrippunithura, Kerala is one of the earliest iron bridges in India. The bridge was built across the Champakara canal (part of National Waterway 3) connecting Tripunithura and Poonithura which is part of the present Kochi Municipal Corporation. It was built by the British in 1890 during the reign of Keralavarma V. The bridge, which is still in use is considered as an heritage landmark of the city of Thrippunithura.

== History ==
The bridge was built by Westwood Bailey Engineering Construction Company of London at a time when there was welding not used for construction works in India. The piers of the bridge are made of cast iron. In the days when there was no piling like today, cast iron pillars were installed in the river. Parts for the bridge were assembled from Britain.

Before the construction of the Tripunithura Mini Bypass, people used to rely on this bridge to travel from Maradu and Gandhi Square to Tripunithura and back. Footbridges were also added to it later on for the smooth passage of pedestrians.
