= Nadamel Marth Mariam Church =

Syriac Orthodox church in Tripunithura, India

Nadamel Marth Mariam Royal Metropolitan Church is a 12th-century Malankara Jacobite Syriac Orthodox church in Tripunithura, India. It was founded around 12th century A.D. by the parishioners of Karingachira Church.

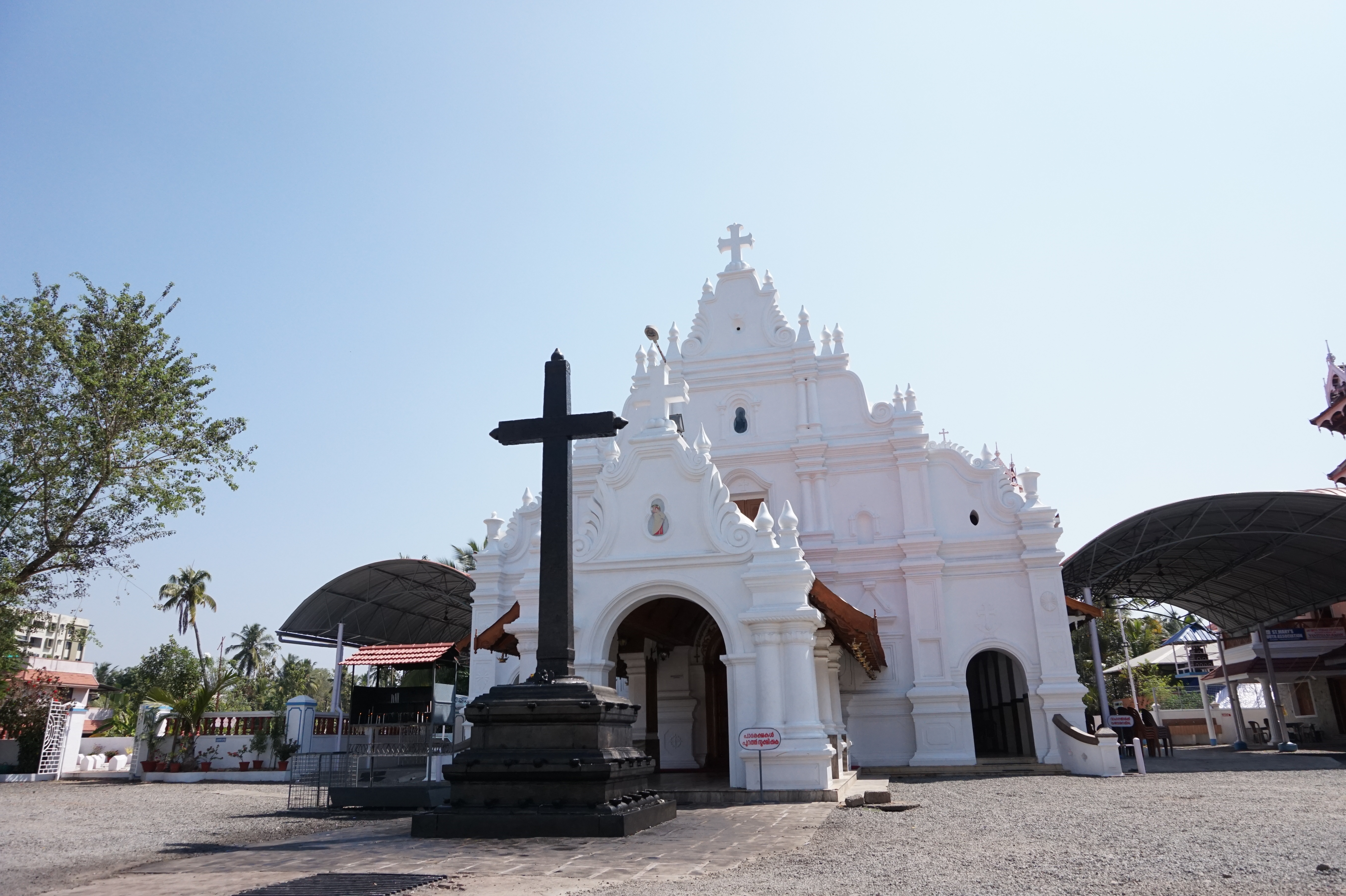
The church in 2017
