= Sree Poornathrayeesa Temple =

Temple in Thrippunithura, Kerala, India

Sree Poornathrayesa Temple
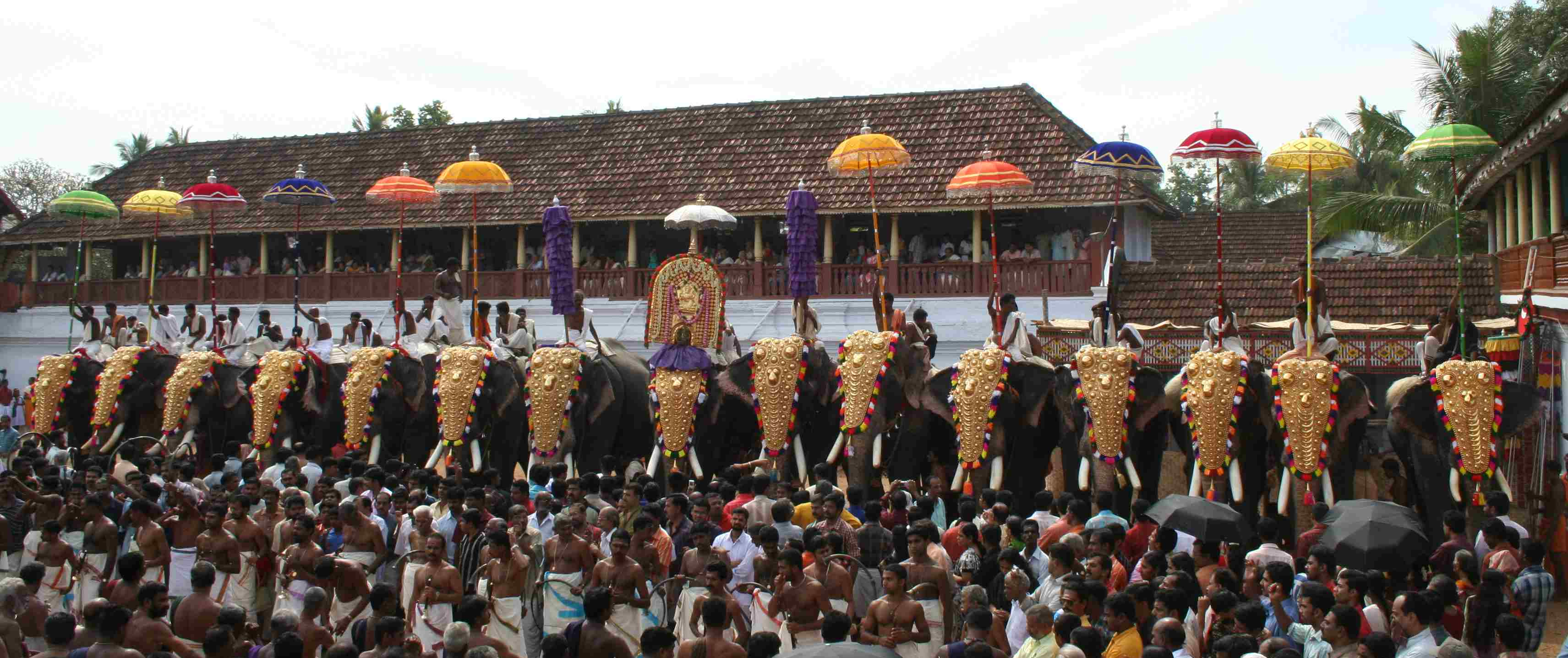
- 'Vrischikotsavam' which starts the festival season

Religion
- Affiliation: Hinduism
- Deity: Vishnu in the form of "Santhana Gopala Moorthy"

Location
- Location: Thrippunithura, Kochi
- State: Kerala
- Country: India
- Interactive map of Sree Poornathrayesa Temple
- Coordinates: 9°56′42.1″N 76°20′32.0″E

Architecture
- Type: Kerala
- Completed: Unknown (Believed to exist since Dvapara Yuga)

Website
- https://sreepoornathrayeesatemple.com

Sree Poornathrayeesa Temple (ശ്രീ പൂര്ണ്ണത്രയീശ ക്ഷേത്രം) is a Hindu temple in Thrippunithura, Kochi, Kerala, India. It is dedicated to Vishnu in his form as Santhanagopala Murthy, or Poornathrayeesa, believed to bless devotees — particularly childless couples — with children. The temple served as the national deity of the Kingdom of Cochin and was the foremost of the kingdom's eight royal temples, with Thrippunithura as the kingdom's former capital. It is considered one of the most important temples in Kerala and follows traditional Kerala temple architecture; the present concrete structure replaced the original wooden sanctum after a fire in 1920. The temple's largest festival is the eight-day Vrischikotsavam, held in the Malayalam month of Vrischikam (November–December) and known for its elephant processions.

The temple is closely associated with elephants: an academic study of the festival records more than 40 elephants taking part in the Vrischikotsavam overall, with around 15 typically present in any single day's procession. In December 2024, the Kerala High Court issued a contempt notice to a Cochin Devaswom Board officer after finding that the festival had breached court-mandated elephant-safety guidelines, with 15 elephants gathered in a confined space in violation of a required three-metre gap between animals.

The temple is famous for its yearly utsavams or festivals. The main one is the Vrischikotsavam, which is conducted annually in the month of Vrishchikam (November–December), kicking off the Utsava season in Kerala. It is an eight-day-long festival known for its grandeur of festivities and cultural programmes like Melam (percussion), Kathakali, and music concerts.

It is believed that childless couples will be blessed with children on praying to Poornathrayeesan. Traditionally, Thrikketta Purappadu day (fourth day of Vrishchikotsavam) sees Poornathrayeesa in opulent majesty, ensconced in a jewel-studded golden accoutrements atop a stately tusker surrounded by 14 elephants while devotees make their offerings in golden pots specially taken out from the temple’s kallara (treasure vault) for the occasion.

== Legend ==
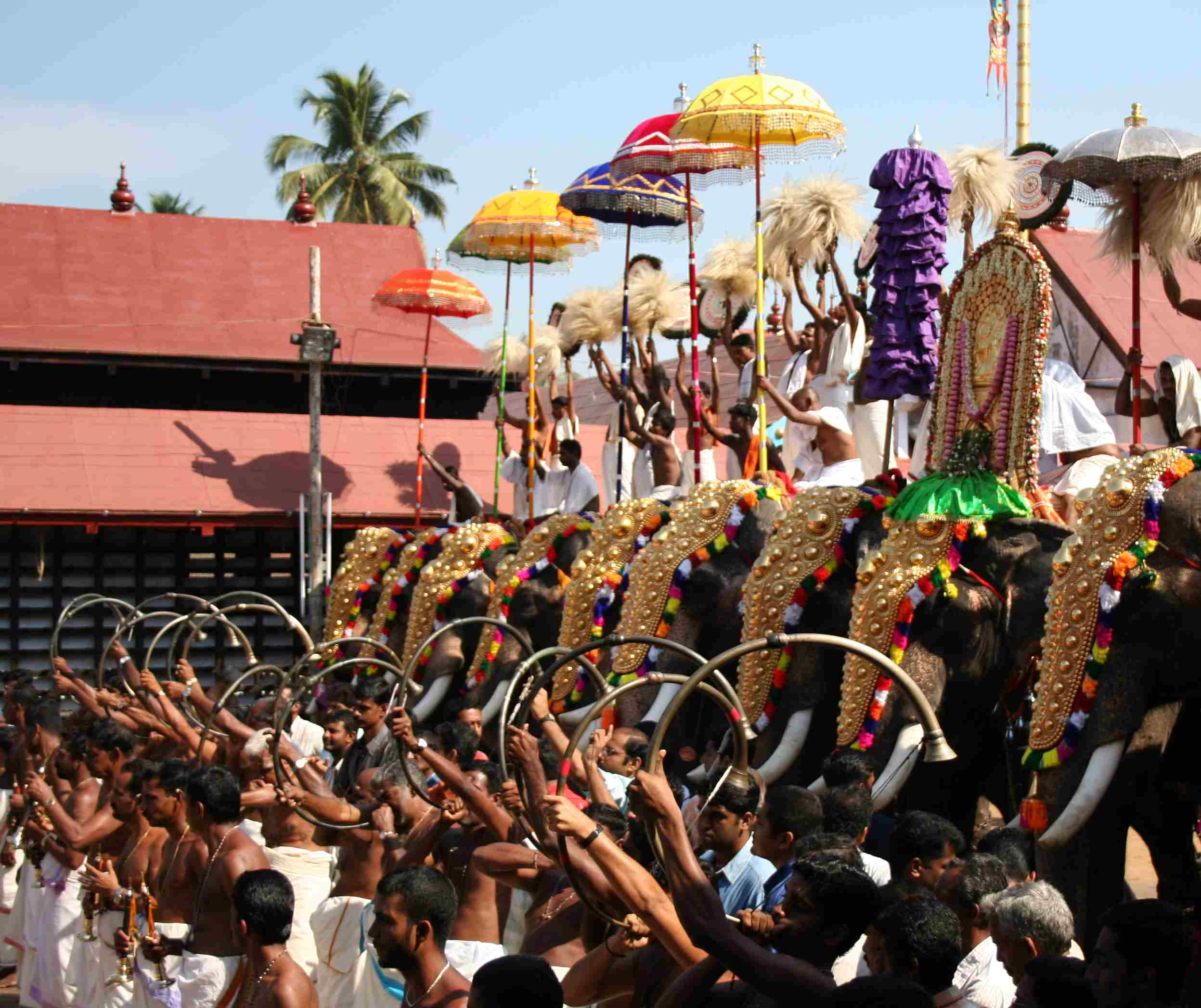
Panchari Melam performance

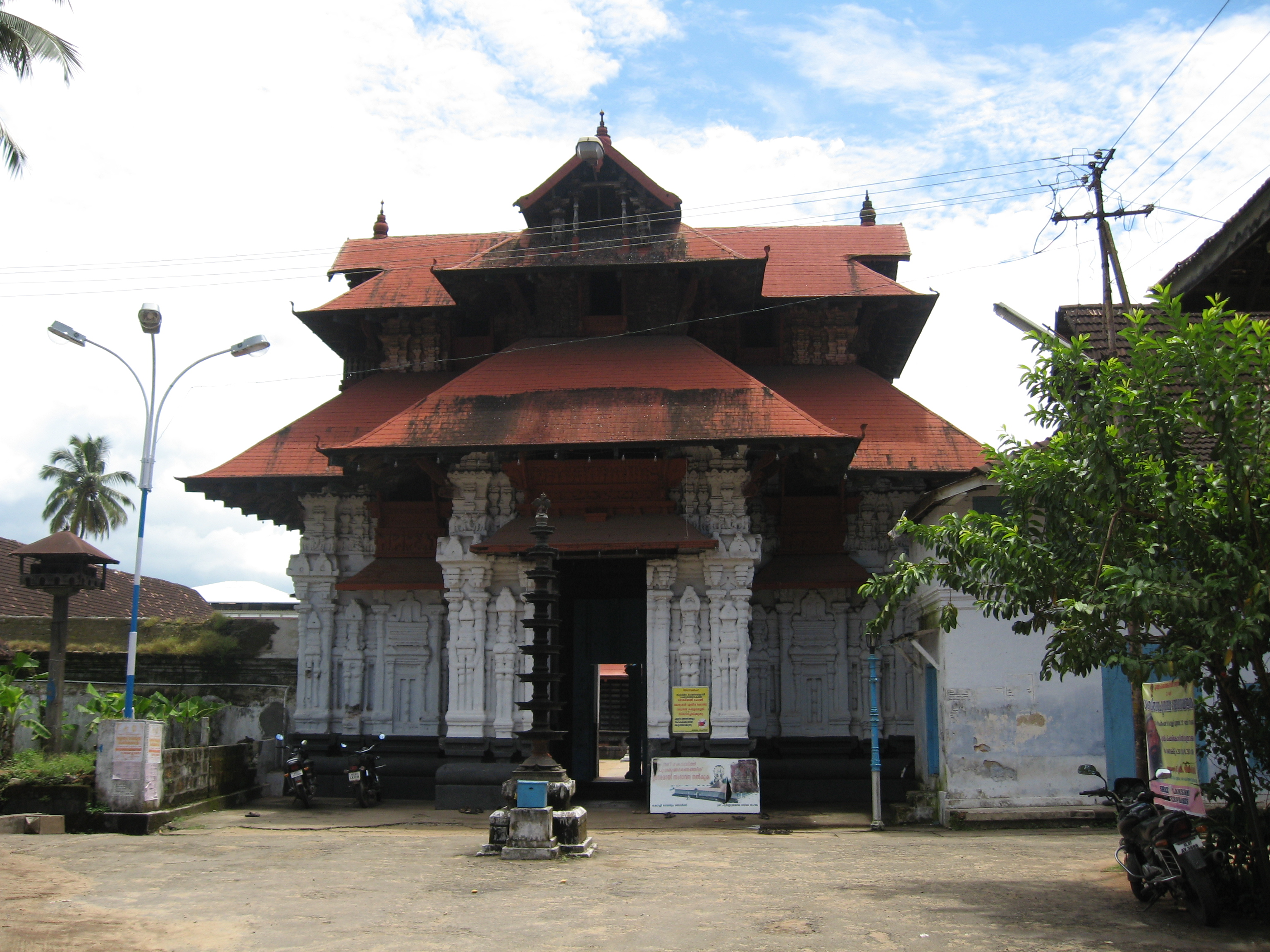
Back of the temple

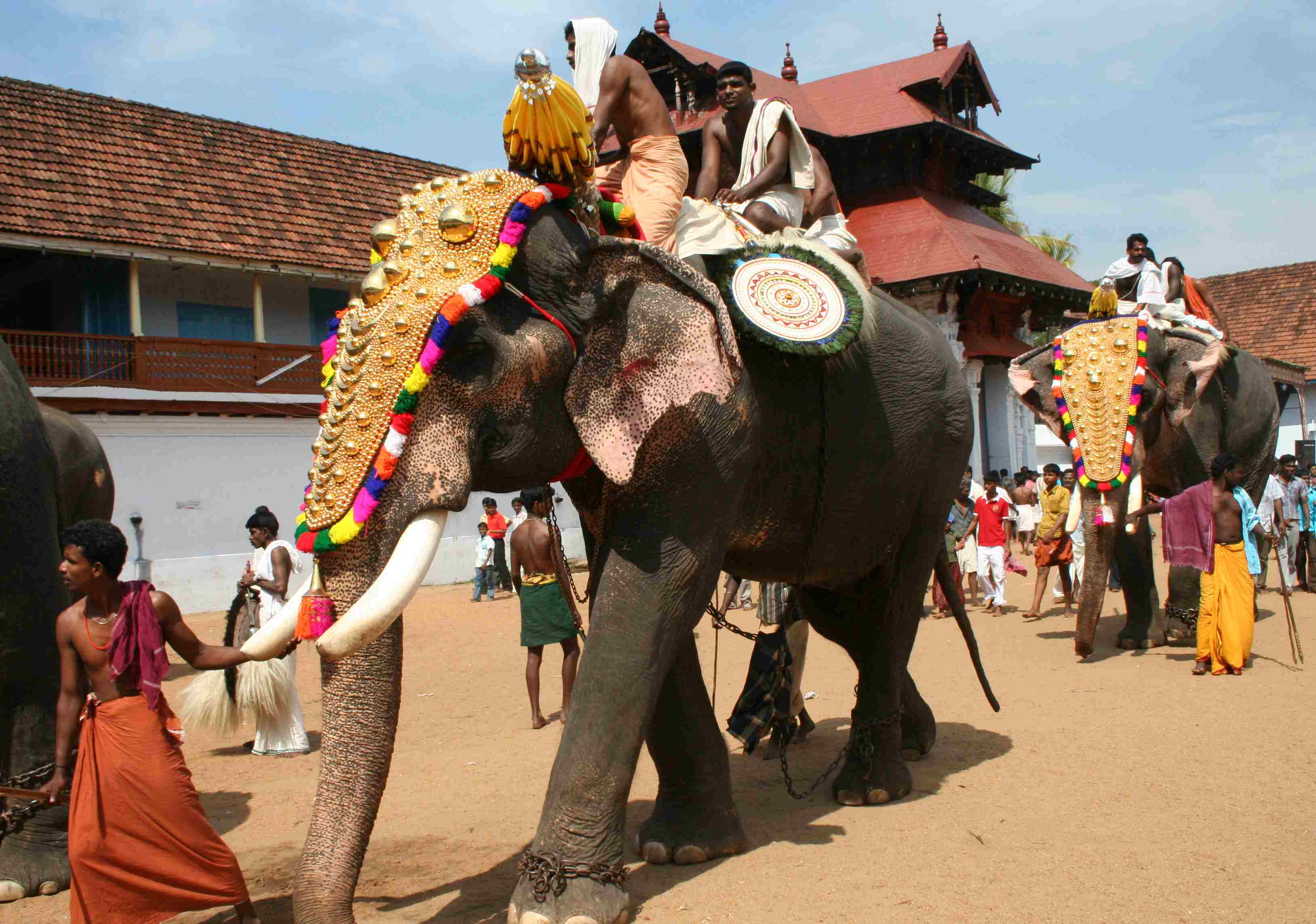
The last day of the festival

According to temple tradition, Vishnu offered the idol of Poornathrayeesa to Arjuna when he sought the god's help to give rebirth to the ten children of a Brahmin. The ten children and the sacred idol were taken by Arjuna in his chariot and he handed over the children to the Brahmin. In memory of this event, a temple was built with a sanctum sanctorum in the form of a chariot. Ganesh was sent by Arjuna to search for a holy place for the installation of the idol. Earlier, the idol was kept in a palace situated west of the main temple, now known as Poonithura Kottaram.

Ganesh, who was attracted by the holiness of the ancient Vedic village of Poornavedapuram (now Tripunithura), tried to occupy the place for himself. Arjuna pushed him to the southern side of the sanctum and installed his idol there; the temple states this is the only shrine where Ganesh faces south, rather than the customary east or west. This differs from the usual custom, where Ganesh has a separate shrine at the south-western side of the inner prakaram. As the place was bounded by mustard fields, Arjuna is said to have used mustard seeds to obtain oil for a lamp; a Valia Vilakku stands in front of the idol, and its oil is popularly said to have medicinal value.

According to legend, Poornathrayeesa is believed to be the elder brother of the goddess of Eroor Pishari Kovil. A separate tradition holds that a devotee named Nangema, of Vadakkedathu Mana, visited the temple daily and was distraught when her marriage to a man from outside Thripunithura was arranged; on the eve of her wedding she went to the temple and did not return, and is believed to have merged with the deity. Each year during the Vrischikotsavam Para Utsavam, Poornathrayeesa is ceremonially taken to Vadakkedathu Mana and welcomed as the family's son-in-law, a visit sometimes called Nangema Utsavam. During the temple's annual festival occasions, deities from Perumthrikovil Temple (Shiva) and Eroor visit here for their aaraattu and a combined pooja and procession, locally called Sankara-Narayana Vilakku (Shiva and Vishnu) and Lakshmi-Narayana Vilakku (Lakshmi and Vishnu). Poornathrayeesa's own aaraattu takes place at the temple pond of Chakkamkulangara Shiva Temple, about a kilometre north-east of the main temple.

Poonithura is regarded as the moolasthaanam, or point of origin, of the deity; the idol is ceremonially taken there each year as part of the Vrischikotsavam festival. Some accounts identify the original site more specifically as the Poonithura Sree Krishna Temple, about 1.5 km west of the main temple, from which a former ruler is said to have shifted the deity to its present location.

== Temple structure ==
The temple is designed in accordance with Kerala temple architecture. A major fire occurred in 1920, after which the temple was rebuilt. Some accounts state the fire destroyed much of the original wooden sanctum sanctorum and that the rebuilt structure, using concrete faced with copper, wood and granite, was designed by the architect Eachara Warrier and was the first concrete temple structure in Kerala.

The side walls of the sanctum sanctorum were heavily decorated with large brass sheets with statutes of gods and goddess, while the roof is covered with copper sheets, while the entrances of sanctum sanctorum were covered with gold sheets.

The first floor of the two-storied gopuram consists of a mandapam (Dias), and eight carved wooden pillars support the mandapam.

== Festivals ==
Ambalam Kathi Ulsavam is a unique festival which is observed to commemorate this incident. Thousands of devotees gather at the temple on this special day which falls in the month of Thulam. After the evening deeparadhana, they set fire to camphor arranged around the temple. All the lamps are lit and it gives off a feeling that the entire temple is on fire.

However, this is not the only festival at the temple. The eight-day Vrischikotsavam, held annually in the Malayalam month of Vrischikam (November–December), is the temple's principal festival.

Vrischikotsavam is a festival which usually starts in November–December every year. The festival lasts for eight days. Events feature traditional folk art forms such as Ottan Thullal, Kathakali, thayambaka, Chenda melam, katcheri, maddala pattu, kombu pattu, and kuzhal pattu. Stalls are set up in front of and behind the temple selling food and various articles.

Apart from this, the temple also hosts two other main festivals and other small celebrations as well every year. The birthday of Poornathrayeesha falls on "Uthram" Nakshathra of the Malayalam month Kumbham (February–March), which is preceded by Para Utsavam, where people give special offerings to the temple.

Every year in August–September, there is another festival called Mooshari Utsavam in commemoration of the sculptor who had moulded the divine image of Poornathrayeesan. It is believed the sculptor himself merged with the divine to give life to the amazing mould of Poornathrayeesha, which is still used in the sanctum.

Lakshmi Naryana Vilakku, Uthram Vilakku and Thulam Ombath Utsavam are other main celebrations every year.

== See also ==
- Chottanikkara Temple
- Elephants in Kerala culture
- Temples of Kerala

== Gallery ==
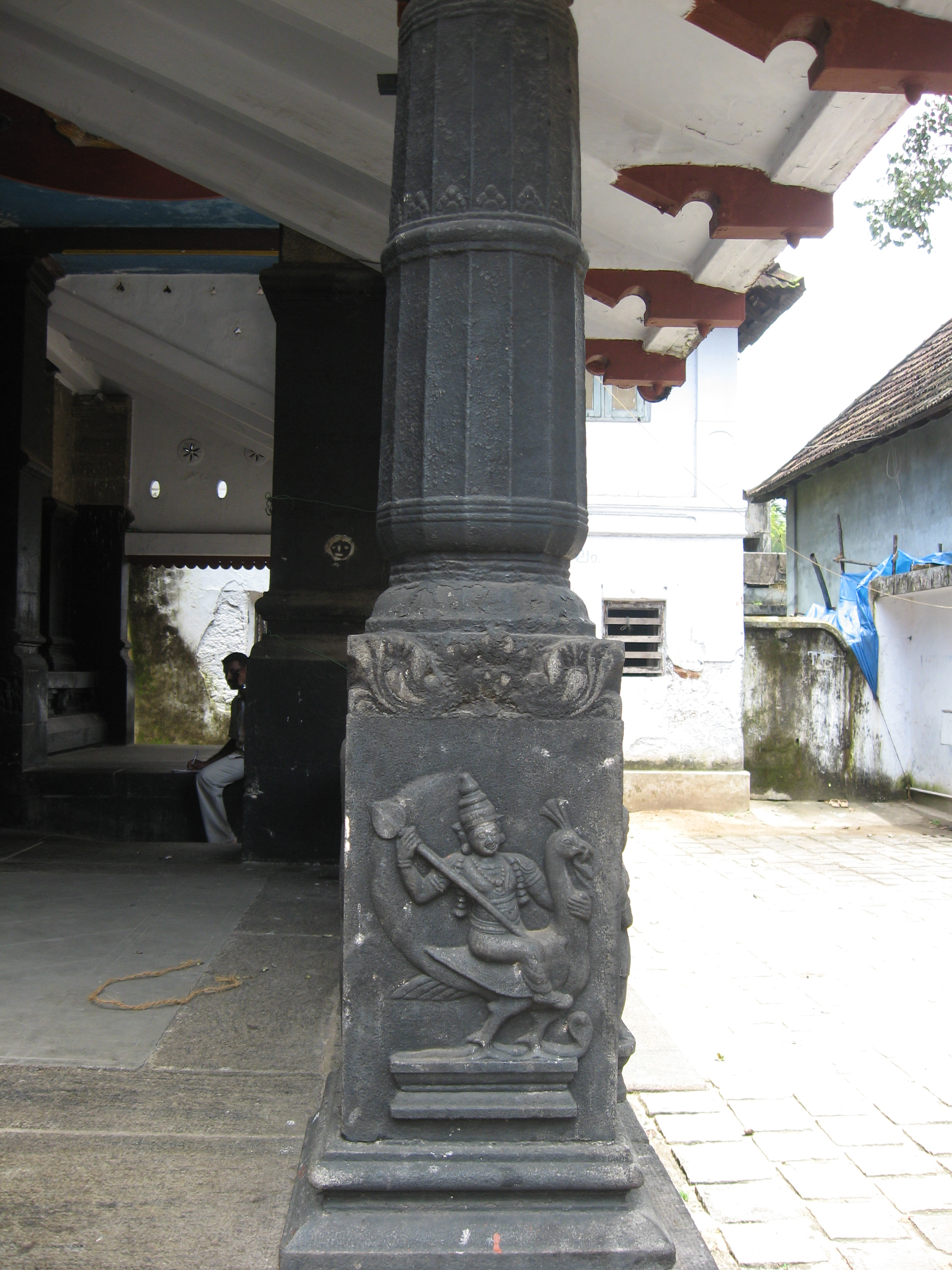
Art work on the Pillars of the Temple

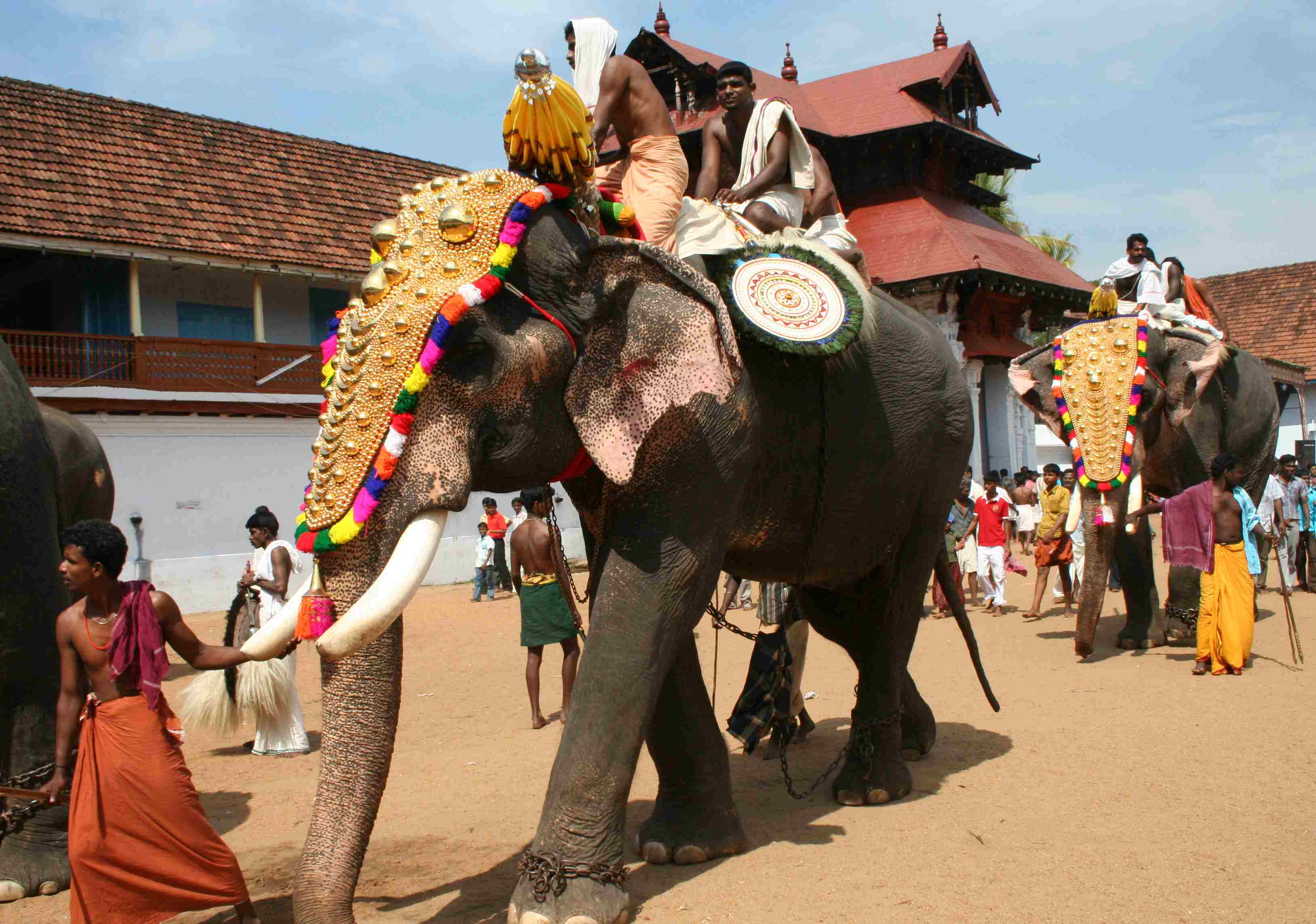
Temple Festival

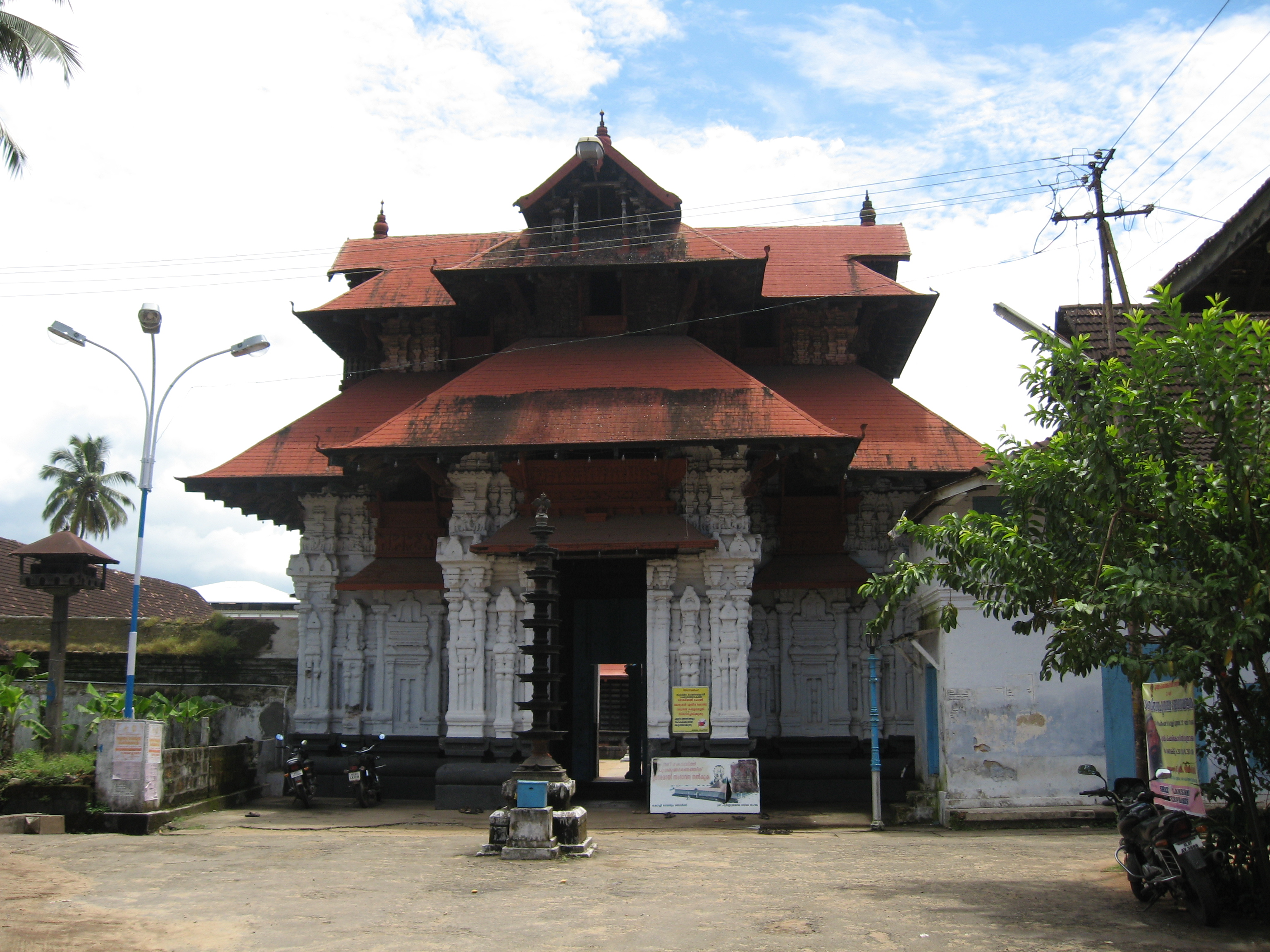
Back side of the Temple

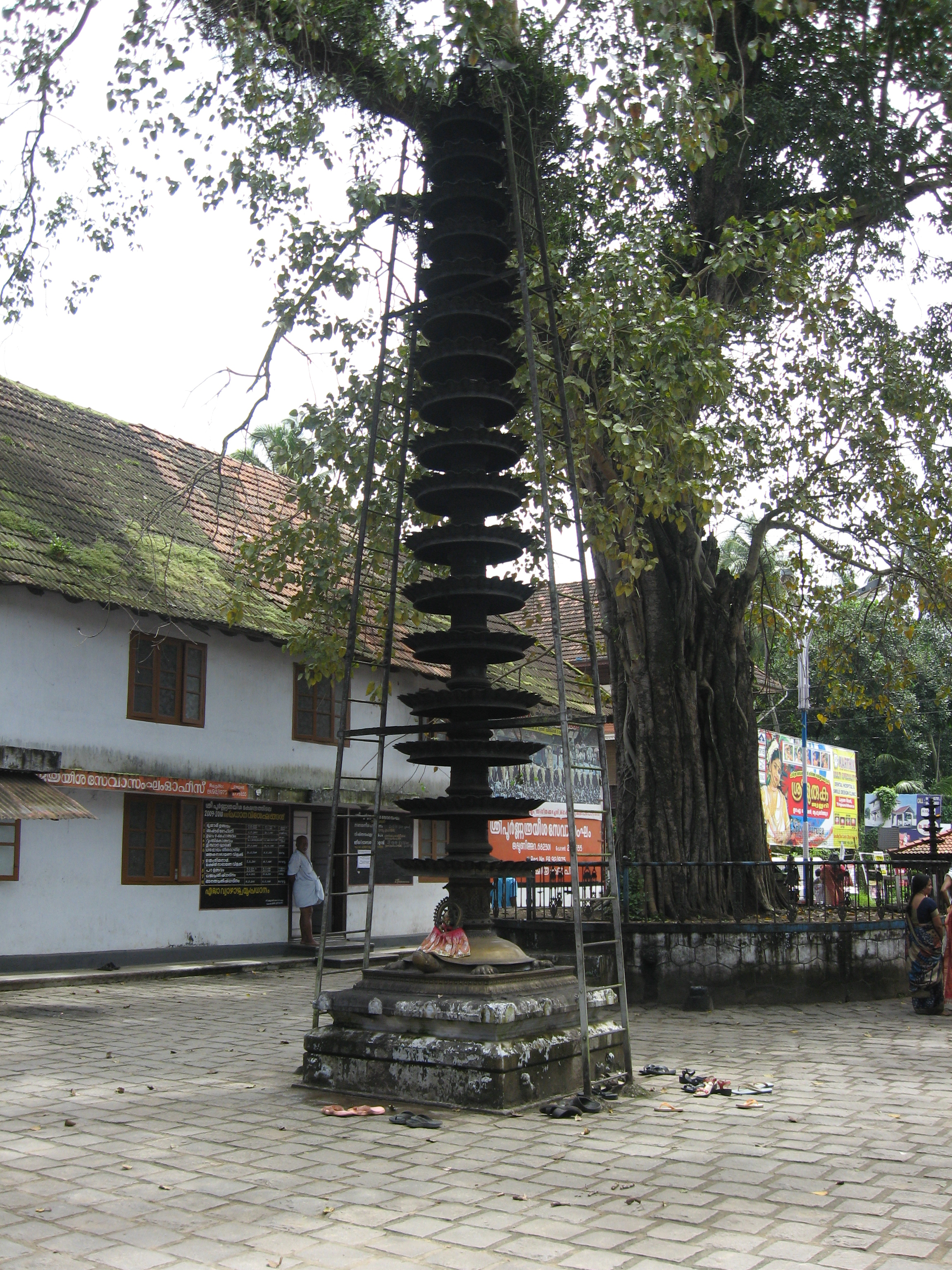
Vilakkumaram in front of the temple

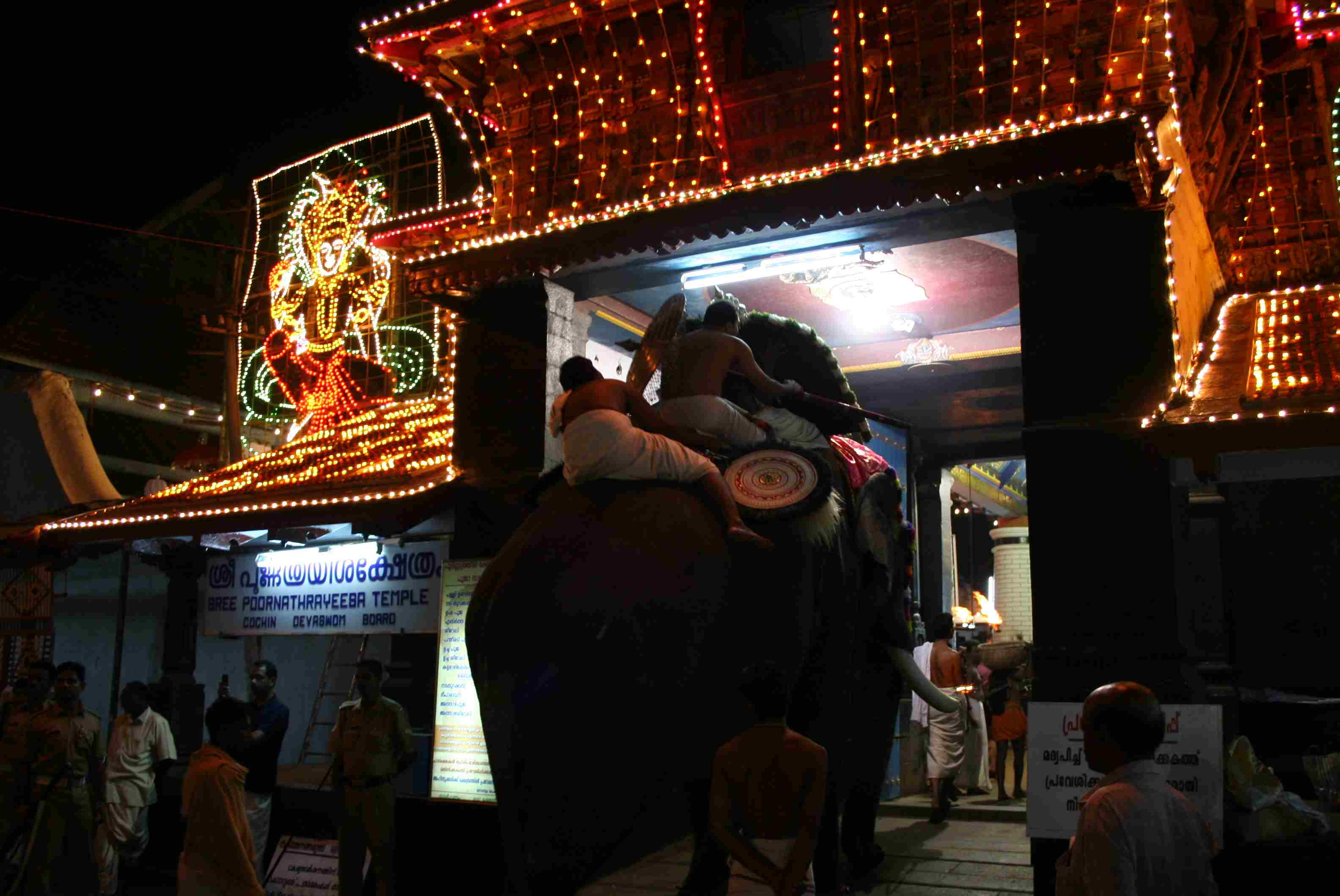
Caparisoned elephants during the festival

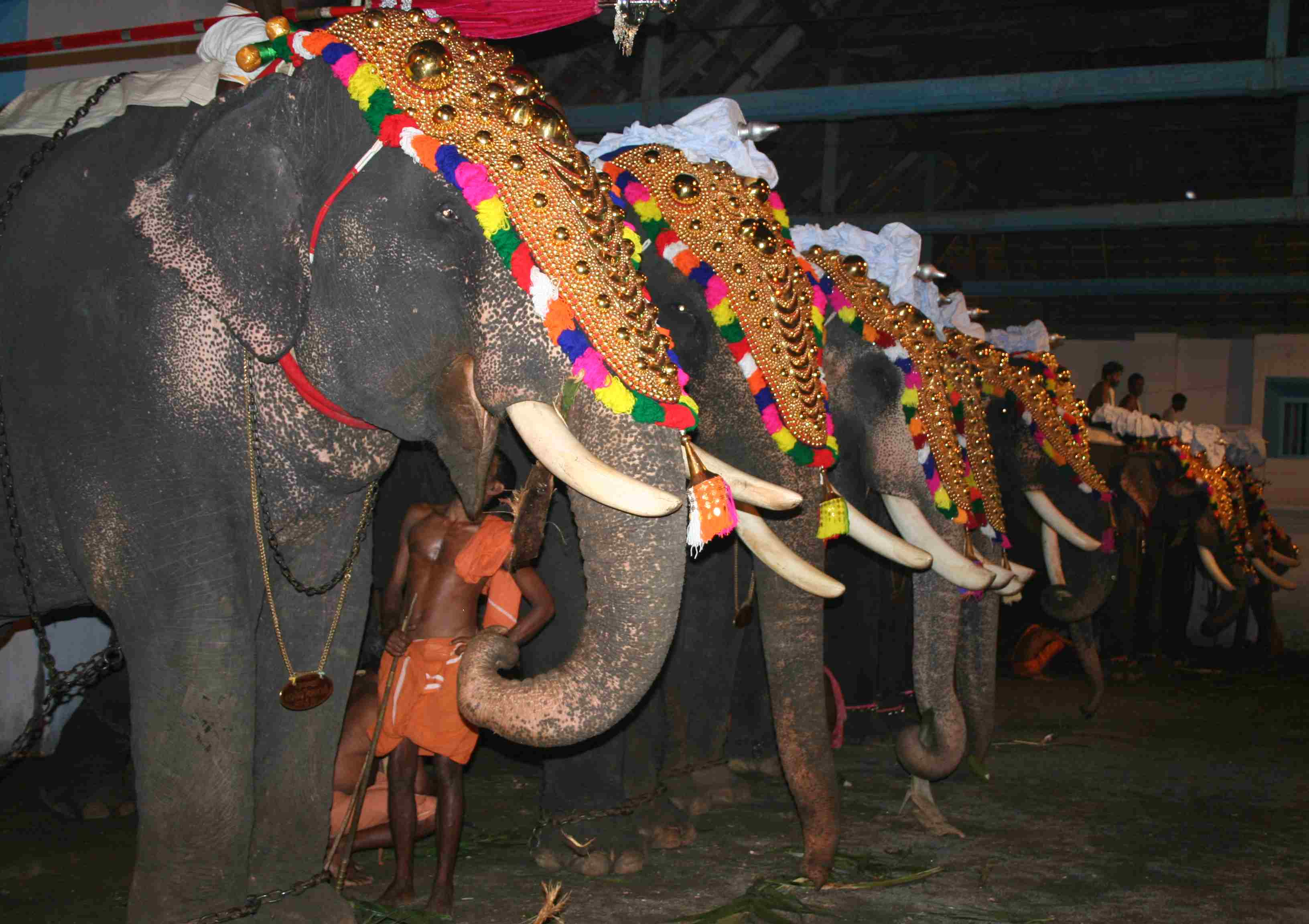
Caparisoned elephants during the festival

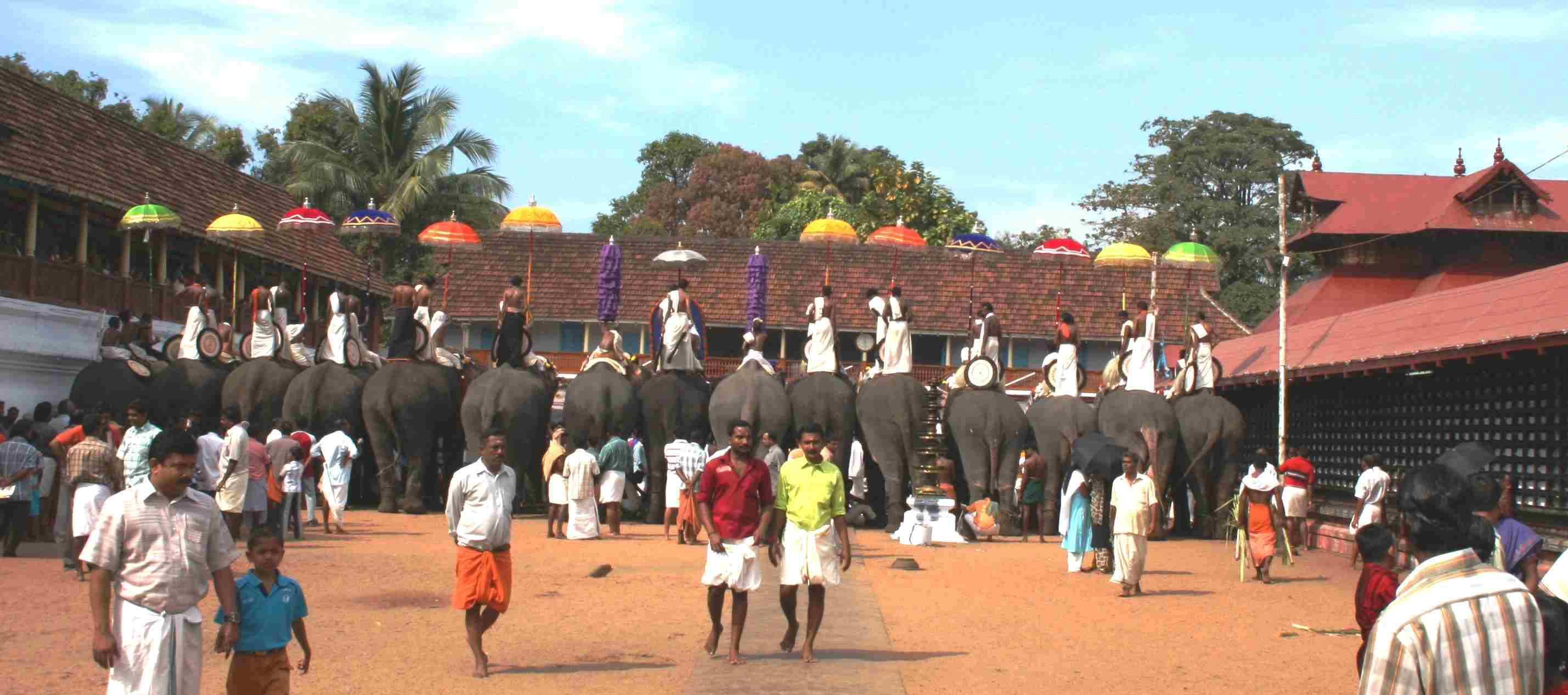
Caparisoned elephants during the festival

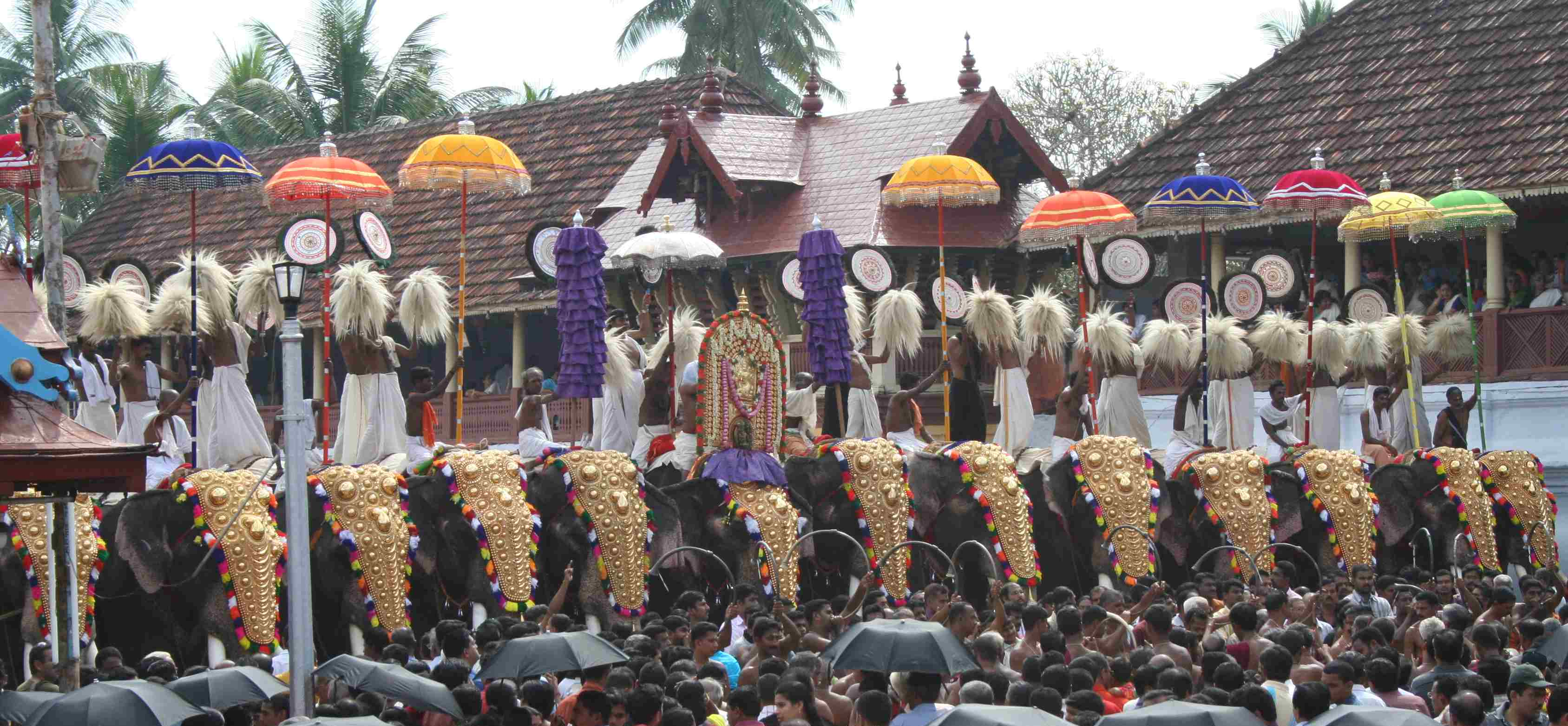
Caparisoned elephants during the festival

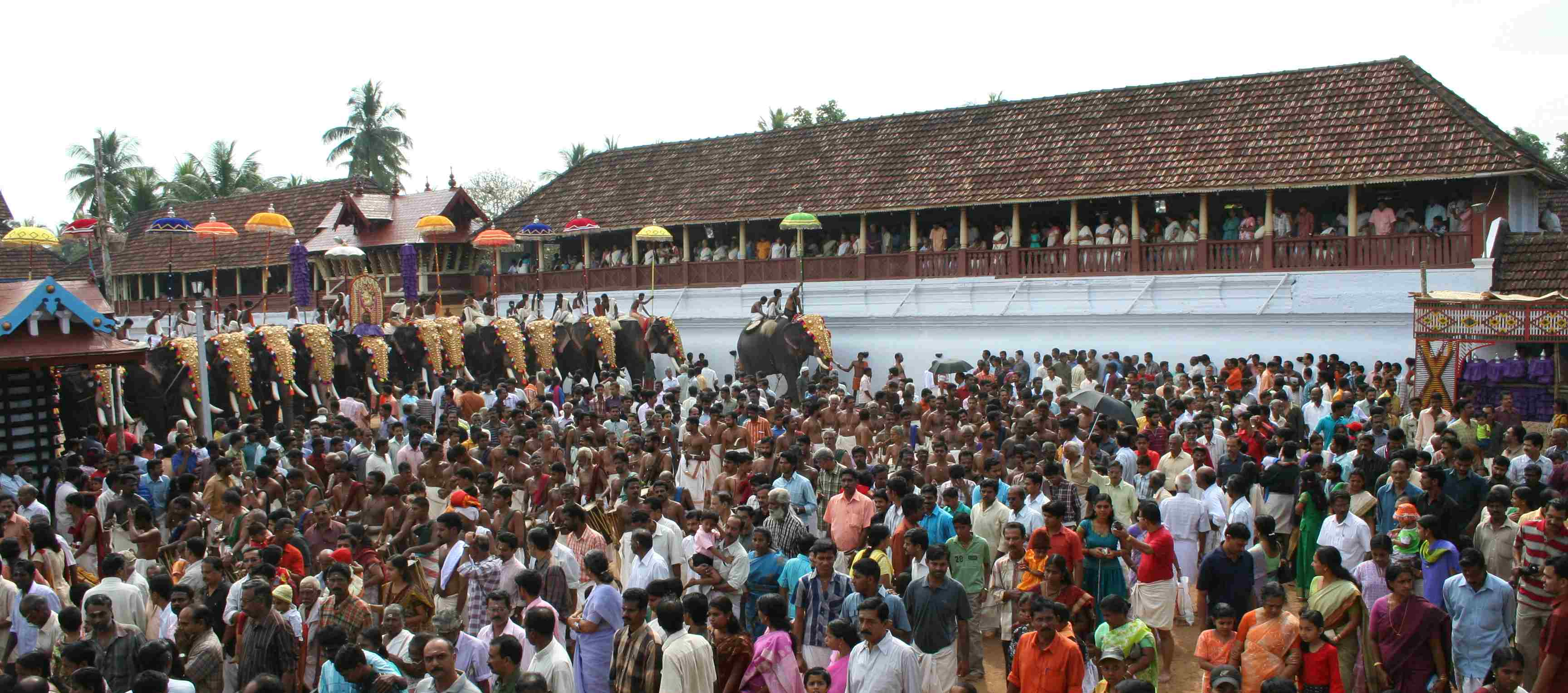
Caparisoned elephants during the festival

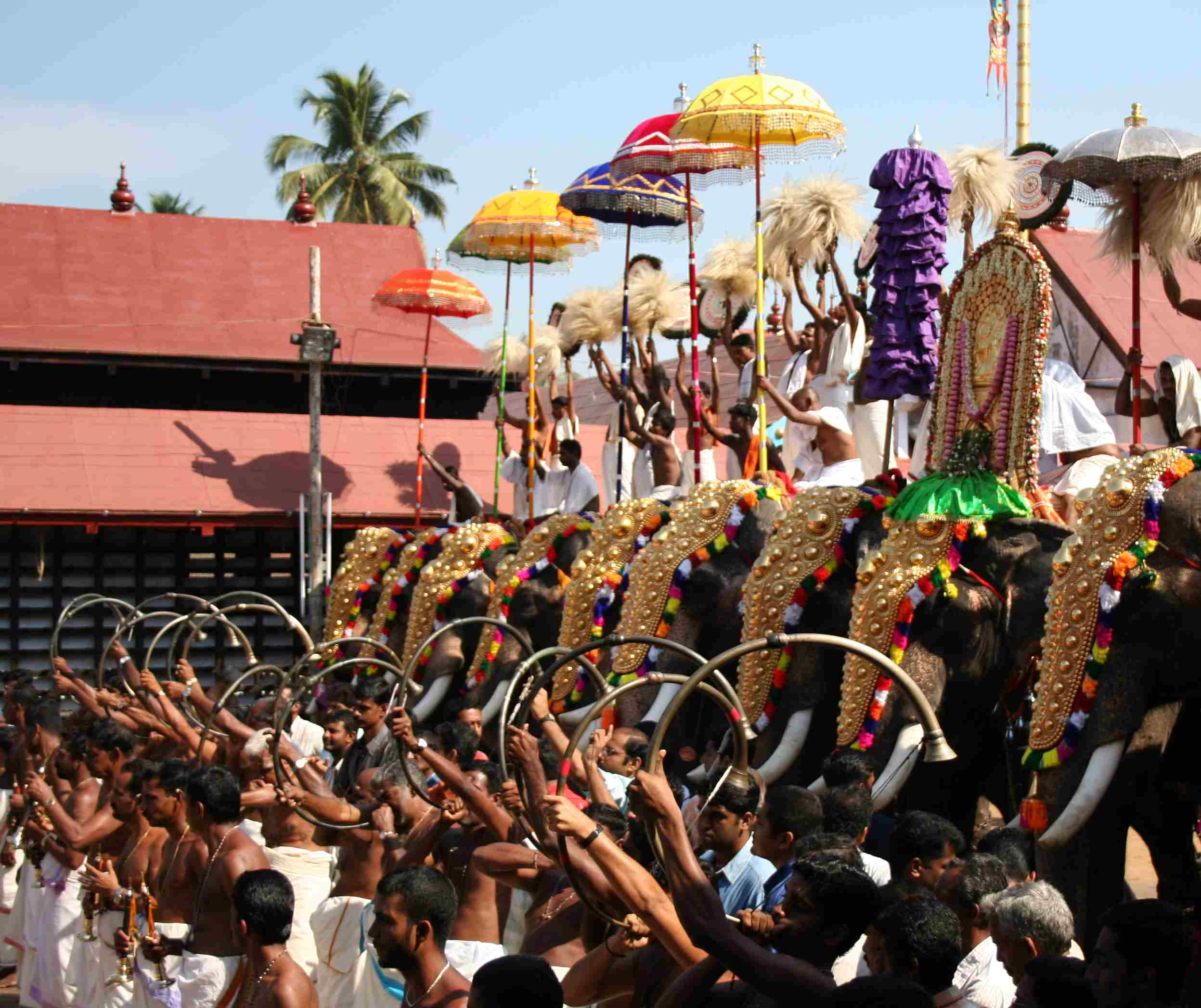
Caparisoned elephants during festival
