= Thrippunithura =

- Municipality
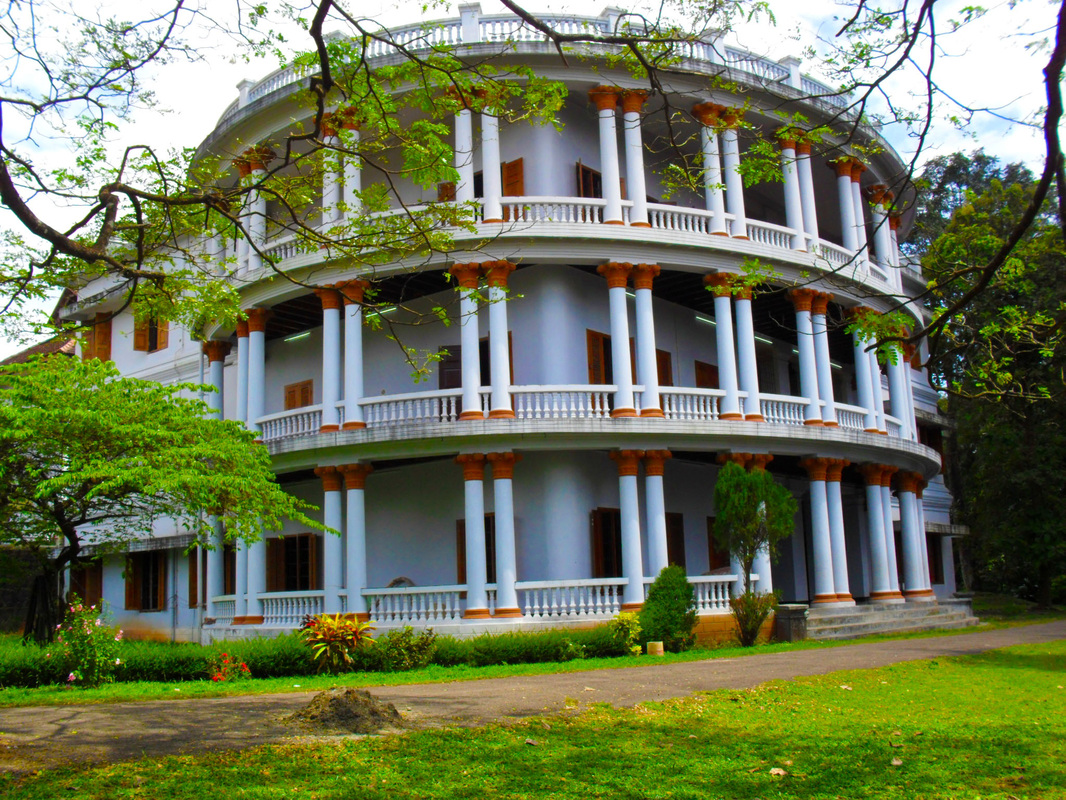
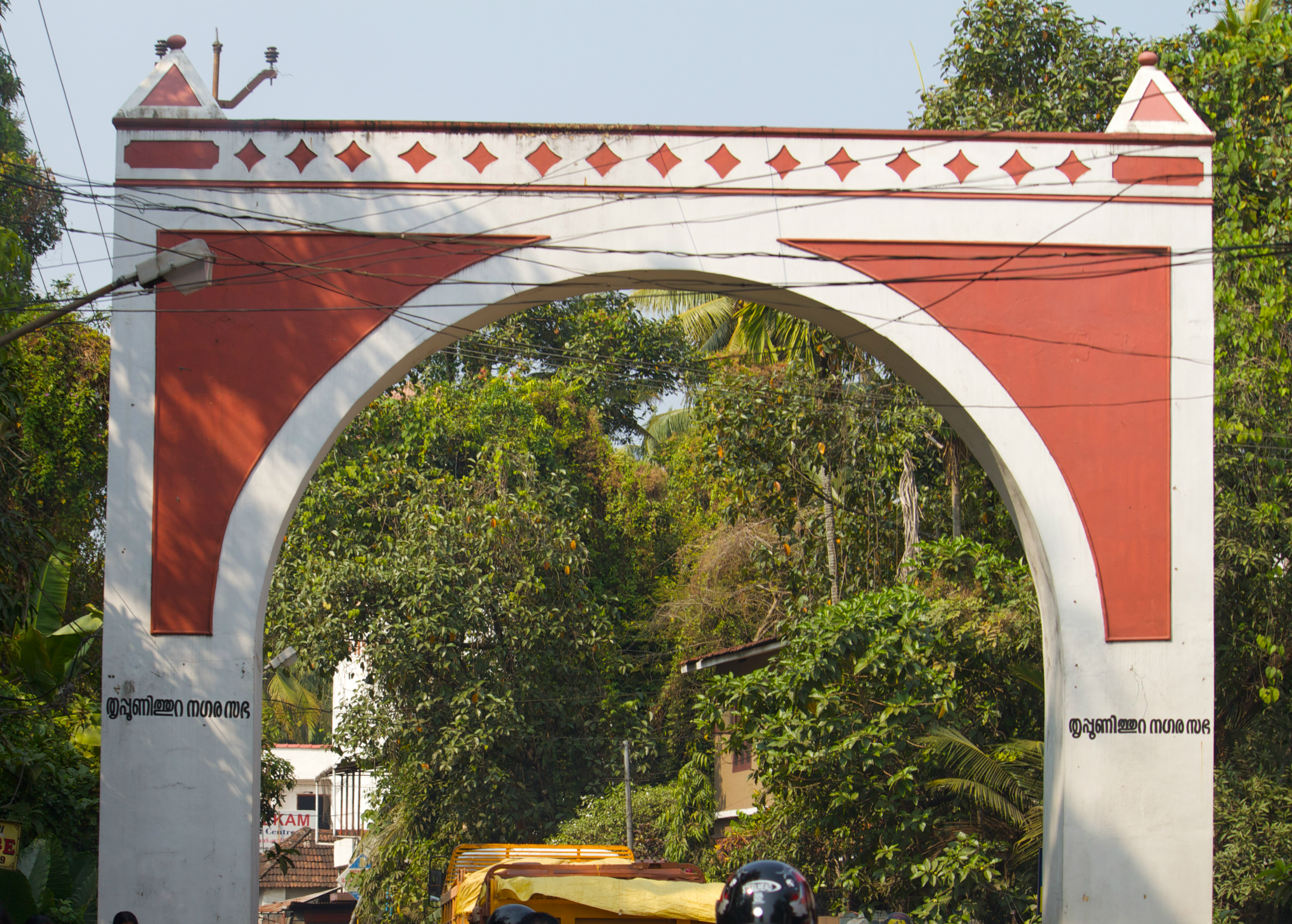
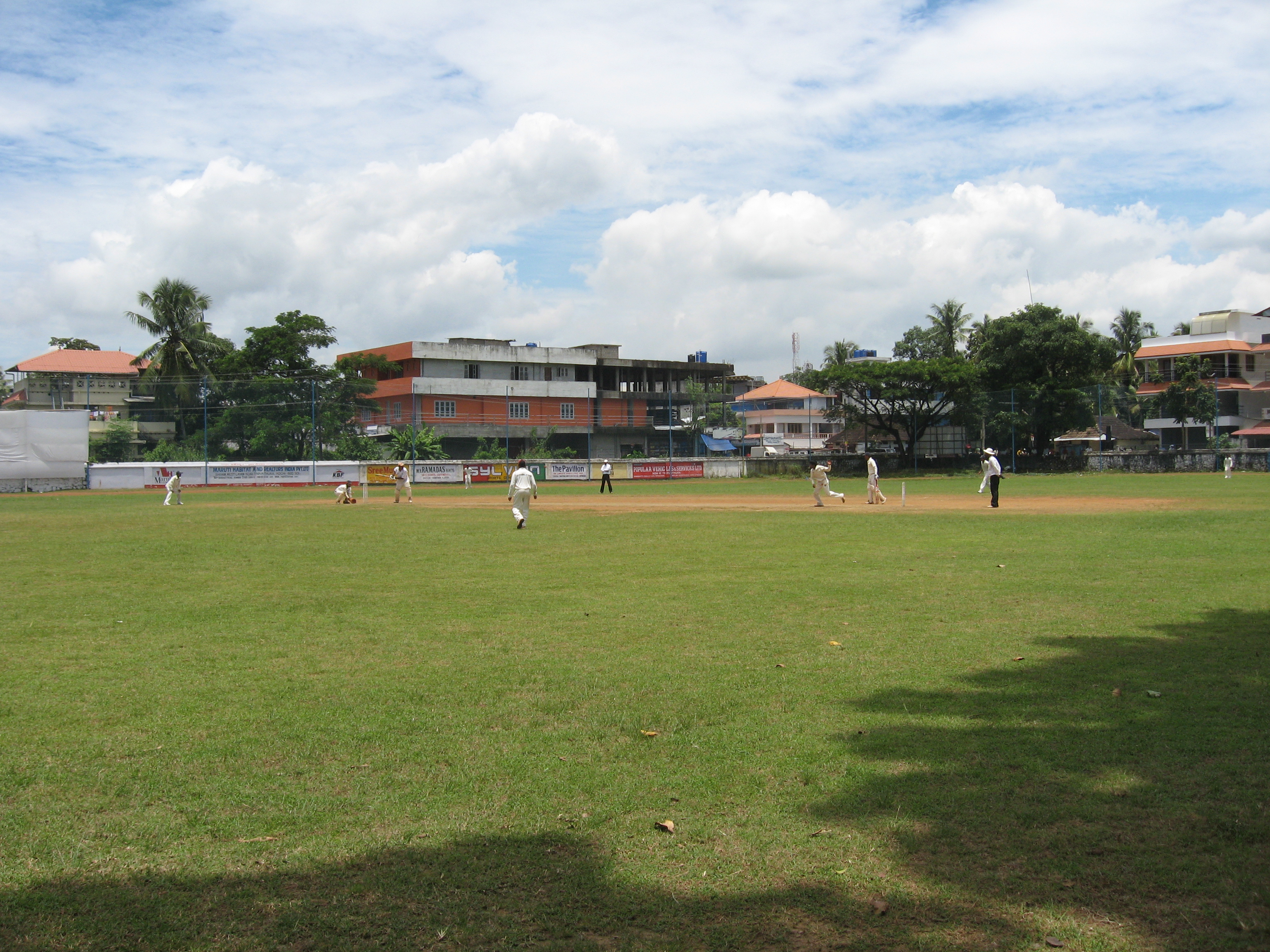
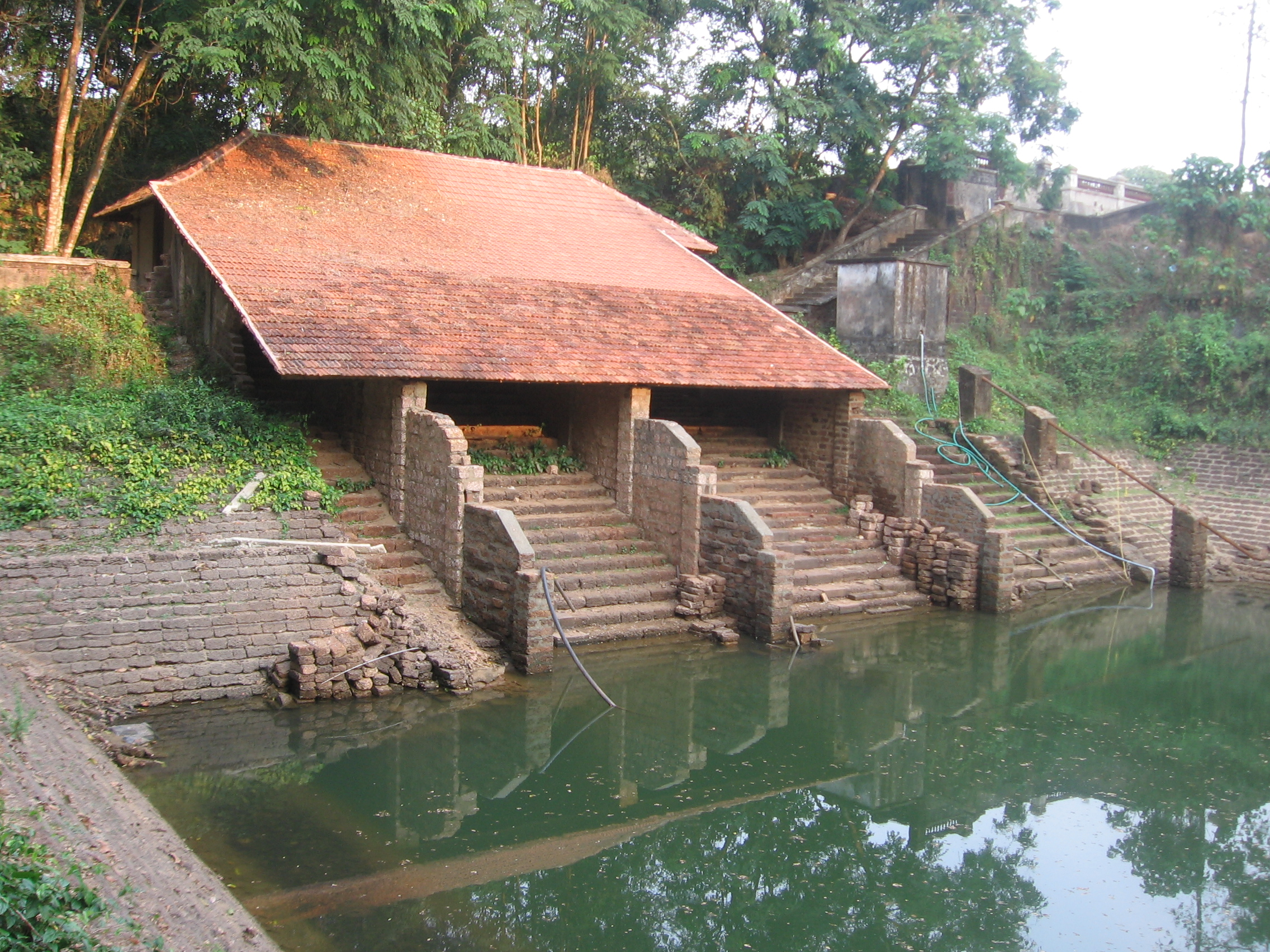
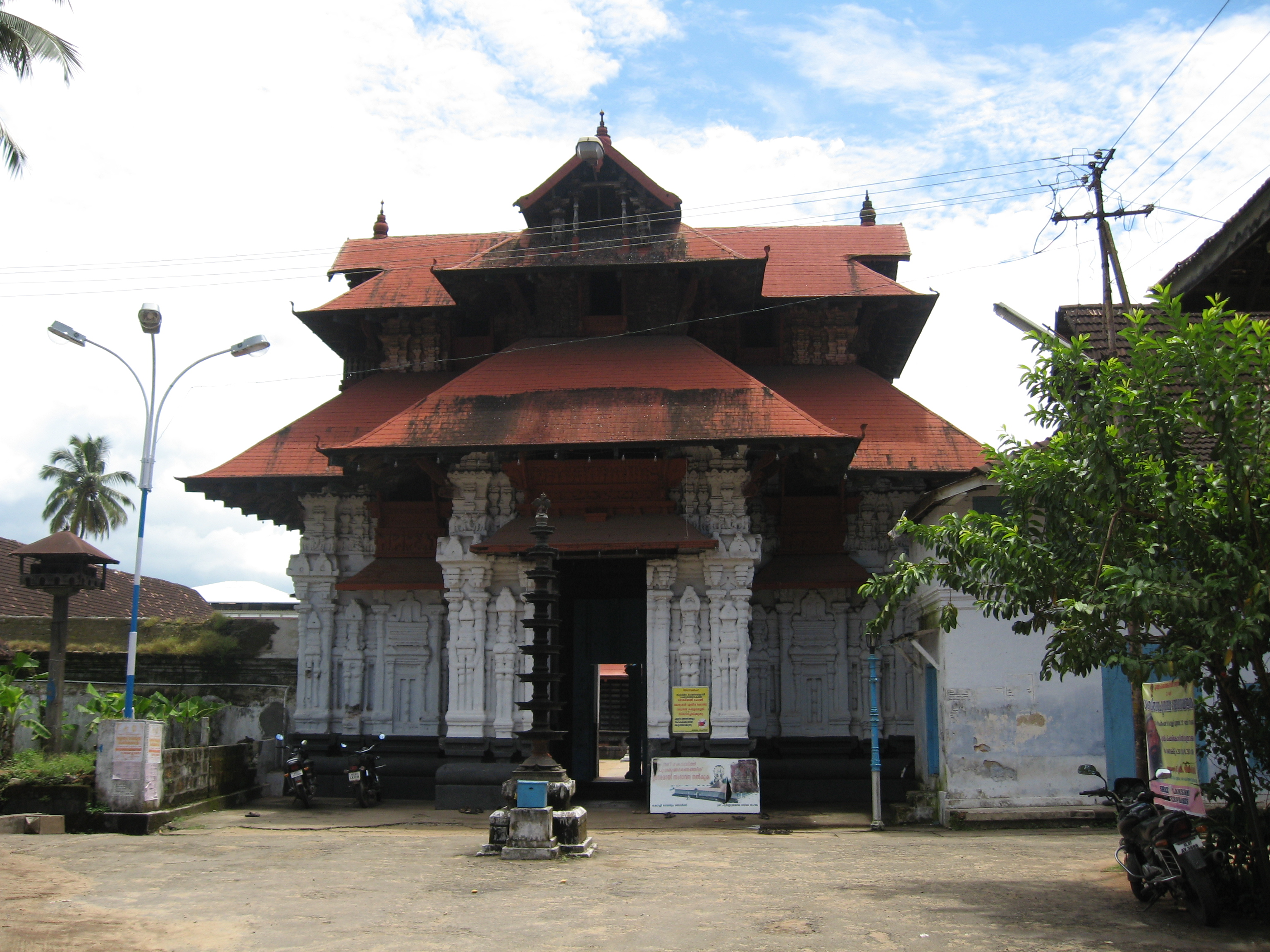
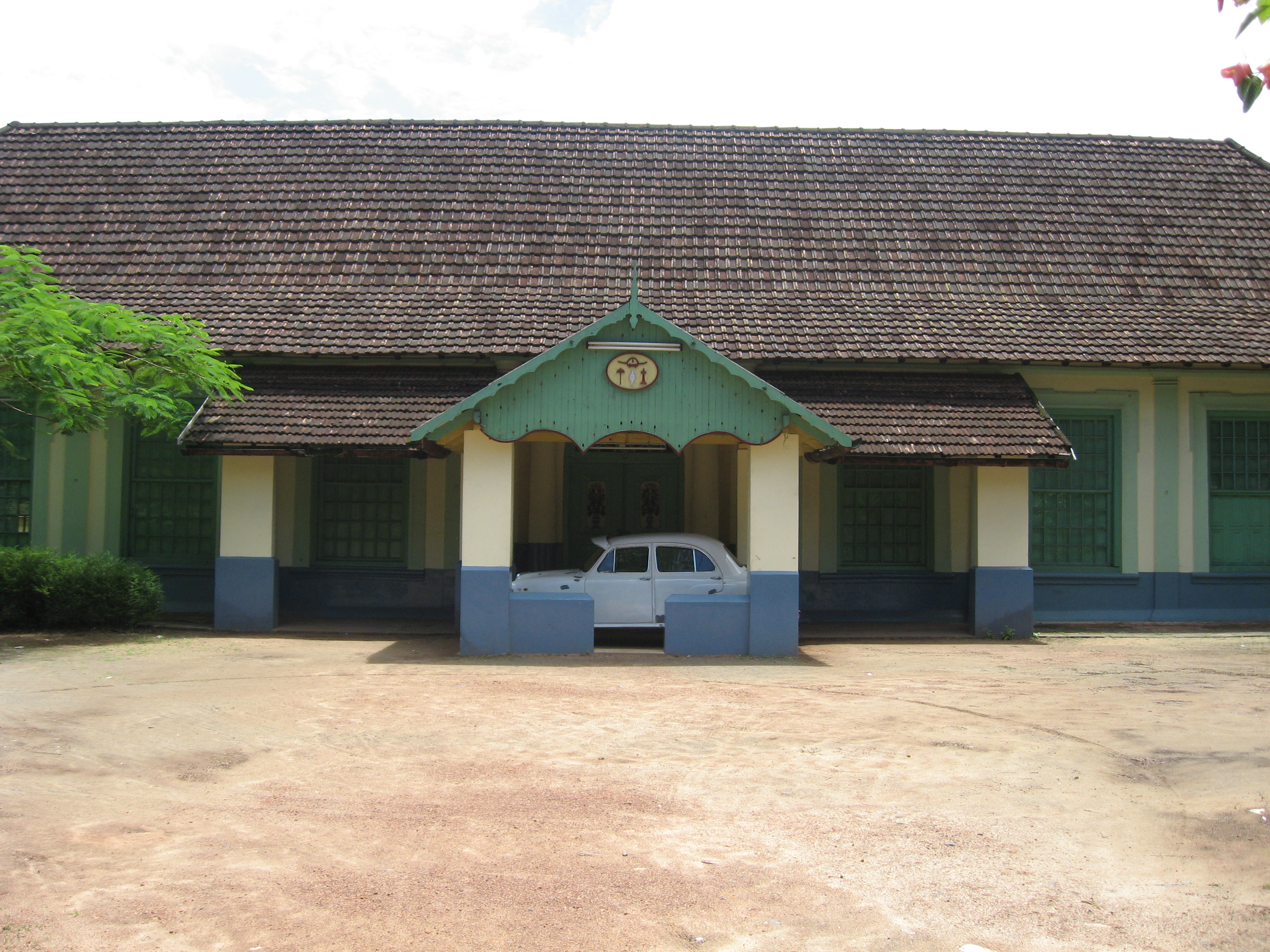
- Clockwise from top: South block of Hill Palace Museum; Palace Oval Ground; Sree Poornathrayeesa Temple; Kalikkotta Palace; Pond in Hill Palace; Kotta Vathil

- Locality in Kerala, India Thrippunithura (India)
- Coordinates: 9°56′38″N 76°20′58″E
- Country: India
- State: Kerala
- District: Ernakulam

Government
  - Type: Municipal Council
  - Body: Thrippunithura Municipality
  - Chairperson: P. L. Babu (BJP)
  - Deputy Chairperson: Radhika Varma (BJP)
- Municipal wards: 53

Area
  - Total: 29.17 km^{2} (11.26 sq mi)

Population
  - Total: 92,521
  - Density: 3,172/km^{2} (8,215/sq mi)

Languages
  - Official: Malayalam, English
- Time zone: UTC+5:30 (IST)
- Telephone code: 0484
- Vehicle registration: KL 39
- Lok Sabha Constituency: Ernakulam

Thrippunithura or Tripunithura (Malayalam:തൃപ്പൂണിത്തുറ) is a prominent historical and residential region in the city of Kochi in Kerala, India. Located about 7 km (4 mi) from the city centre, Tripunithura was the capital of the erstwhile Kingdom of Cochin. The descendants of the Cochin royal family still live here. The Hill Palace situated in Tripunithura was the palace of Maharaja of Cochin, the ruler of Kingdom of Cochin. Tripunithura is also well known for its historical cultures and worldwide famous because of Sree Poornathrayeesa Temple and the annual festival Vrishchikoltsawam that takes place at the temple.

In local administration, it is a municipality named Tripunithura Municipality. In the state administrative structure, Tripunithura is part of the Ernakulam District in the state of Kerala.

== Etymology ==
Some latter day Sanskrit enthusiasts describe the origin of the name to "pūrṇa vēda puri" – the town of Vedas in its entirety. Another possible origin to name comes from the meaning "the land on the shores of Poorna river" above doesn't give sense. Thirupunithra = Thiru punitha thara (or Thiru Punitha Thura) means the land that which is holy(thara literally means a platform or an elevated stage). The word Pooni has multiple means, two of which are 'bullocks', 'a type of water bird'. Pooni might also refer to the bag used to carry arrows.

== History ==
Thrippunithura is known as the Raja Nagari (royal city) and is one of the most prominent centers of traditional Kerala cultural heritage. The palaces of the Cochin Royal House are renowned for being patrons of traditional arts, architecture, literature and music. The erstwhile rulers of Kingdom of Cochin were great patrons of art. This made fine arts and architecture flourish under them in many ways. The town is also a prominent centre of learning for classical arts like Carnatic music, Kathakali and Mohiniyattam besides percussion instruments like mridangam, chenda and maddalam. Much of this is facilitated by the RLV College of Music and Institute of Fine Arts was established here in 1956. Another center of learning is Kerala Kalalayam which was established by Kathakali artist Padmashree Kalamandalam Krishnan Nair and Mohiniyattam artist Kalamandalam Kalyanikutty Amma in 1952. Tripunithura has many dedicated centers for stage performances and promotion of art established by the royal family

== Politics ==
Thrippunithura is part of the Ernakulam Lok Sabha constituency in Indian Parliament. The current elected member of parliament representing the constituency is Hibi Eden of the Indian National Congress. The Ernakulam Lok Sabha constituency elects seven members to the state Legislative Assembly, one each from Ernakulam, Kalamassery, Kochi, Paravur, Thrikkakara, Thrippunithura and Vypin.

In the state legislative assembly, Thrippunithura comes under the Thrippunithura Assembly constituency. As of the 2021 assembly elections, the current MLA is K. Babu, elected from the Indian National Congress.

== Demographics ==
Historical population
| Year | Pop. | ±% |
|---|---|---|
| 1991 | 51,078 | — |
| 2001 | 59,884 | +17.2% |
| 2011 | 69,390 | +15.9% |

As per the 2011 census of India, Thrippunithura has a population of 69,390 and a population density of 3,713 inhabitants per square kilometre (9,620/sq mi). Of this, 48.9% are males and 51.1% are female. 8.18% of the population is under 6 years of age. Scheduled Castes and Scheduled Tribes constitute 9.44% and 0.24% of the population respectively. The total literacy rate was 97.71% (98.61% for males and 96.85% for females), which is higher than the state average of 94% and the national average of 74.04%.

=== Religion ===
Religion in Thrippunithura (2011)
1. Hinduism (82.8%)
2. Christianity (15.3%)
3. Islam (1.35%)
4. None (0.54%)
5. Other (0.05%)

Thrippunithura is one of the most homogenous areas in Kerala in terms of religion. According to the 2011 census, Hindus are the majority with 82% of the population adhering to the religion. Christians form a small minority, constituting 15% of the population. Muslims constitute 1% of the population.

Thrippunithura is home to the Sree Poornathrayeesa Temple, widely known throughout Kerala for its yearly Vrishcikotsavam. It is the first of the eight royal temples of the erstwhile Kingdom of Cochin. Thrippunithura also has had a long presence of St. Thomas Christians from antiquity. The Nadamel Marth Mariam Church (Nadamel Pally), established in A.D. 1175, is the oldest church in Thrippunithura.

== Education ==
Tripunithura has many educational institutions which makes the place a good haven for education. Primary, High and Higher Secondary School education is available in many schools. The Government schools functioning in Tripunithura include the Government Sanskrit High School, Government Girls High School, Government Palace High School and Government Boys High School as well as private management schools like The Convent School and The Shree Venkiteshwara School.

There are also a few privately managed CBSE schools, namely, Chinmaya Vidyalaya, Bhavans Vidya Mandir, Sree Narayana Vidya Peetam Public School, the Nair Service Society (NSS) Higher Secondary School, The Choice School which function in various parts of the town to provide the necessary basics and also higher education for children. The landmark of the town is the RLV Music College which provides proteges with training in Classical music and has also produced many great singers most notably K. J. Yesudas.

Tripunithura also has 4 government colleges such as Government College Tripunithura (Arts College), Sanskrit College Tripunithura, RLV College of Fine Arts, and Government Ayurveda College.

== Geography ==
In the south, Thrippunithura borders the Vembanad, the longest lake in India. The lake provides facilities for inland water navigation, with the Champakkara canal stretch of the National Waterway 3 forming its western boundary with Kochi and Maradu. The canal then merges with the Chithrapuzha river in the north, near Irumpanam. Thrippunithura has an average elevation of 8 m (26 ft) above sea level, with the areas near Thiruvankulam in the easternmost boundaries rising to 30m.

== Transport ==
Tripunithura has a main bus-stand in its main centre with buses going from and coming into from different locations. Furthermore, it has bus-stops in almost every part of the town which makes travel by bus easier. Railway transport is also available. NH 85 (Kochi Madurai highway) or Old NH 49 passes through Karingachira. Ernakulam-Ettumanoor State Highway(SH 15) also passes through Thrippunithura.

Tripunithura railway station is a major railway station in Ernakulam to Kottayam route with many passenger trains and express trains having a stop here.

Thripunithura metro station has started its operations since 6 March 2024. The iron bridge at Thrippunithura is one of the oldest iron bridges in India.

== Royal Heritage ==
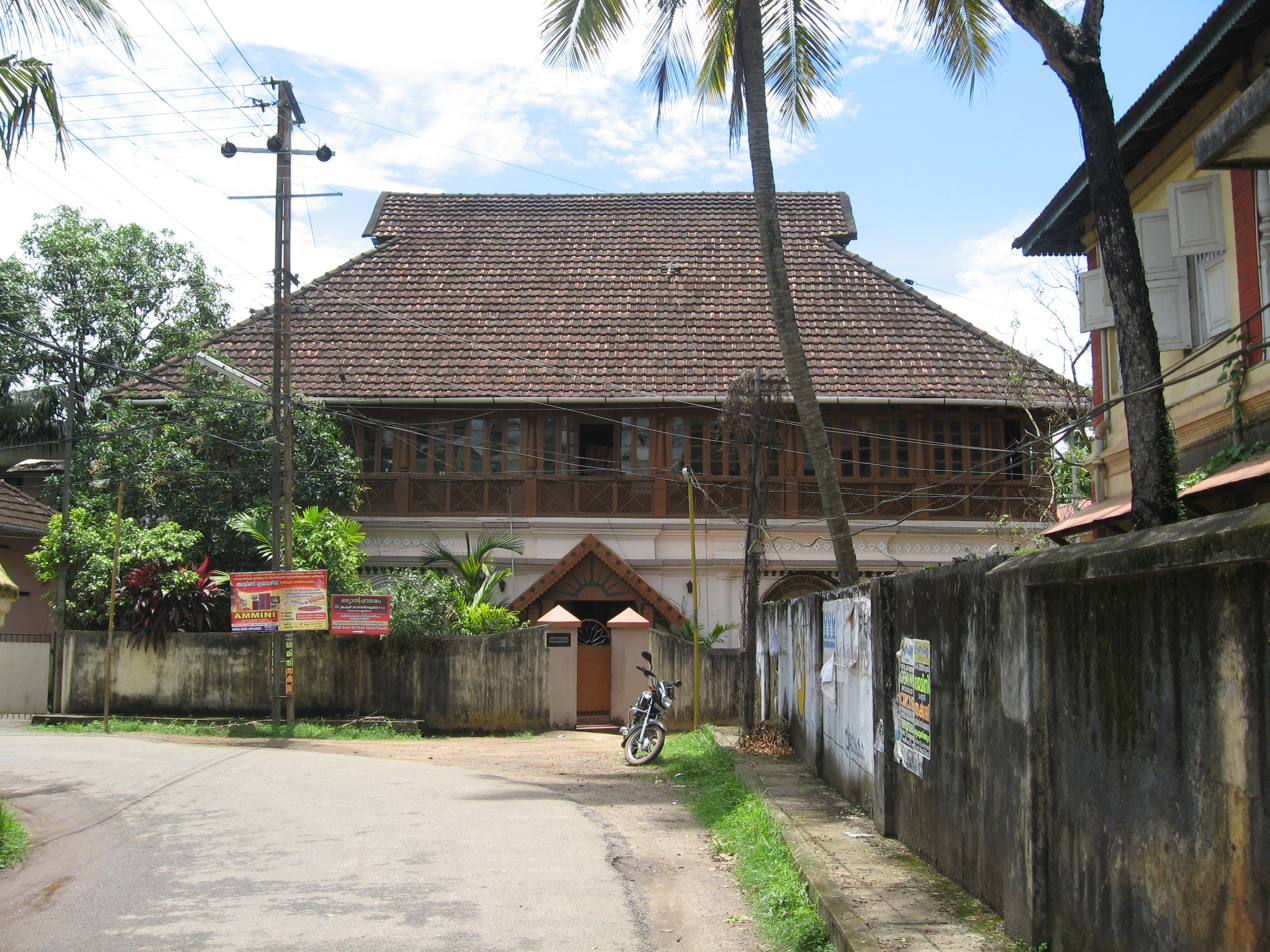
Raj Bhavan Palace, Thripunithura

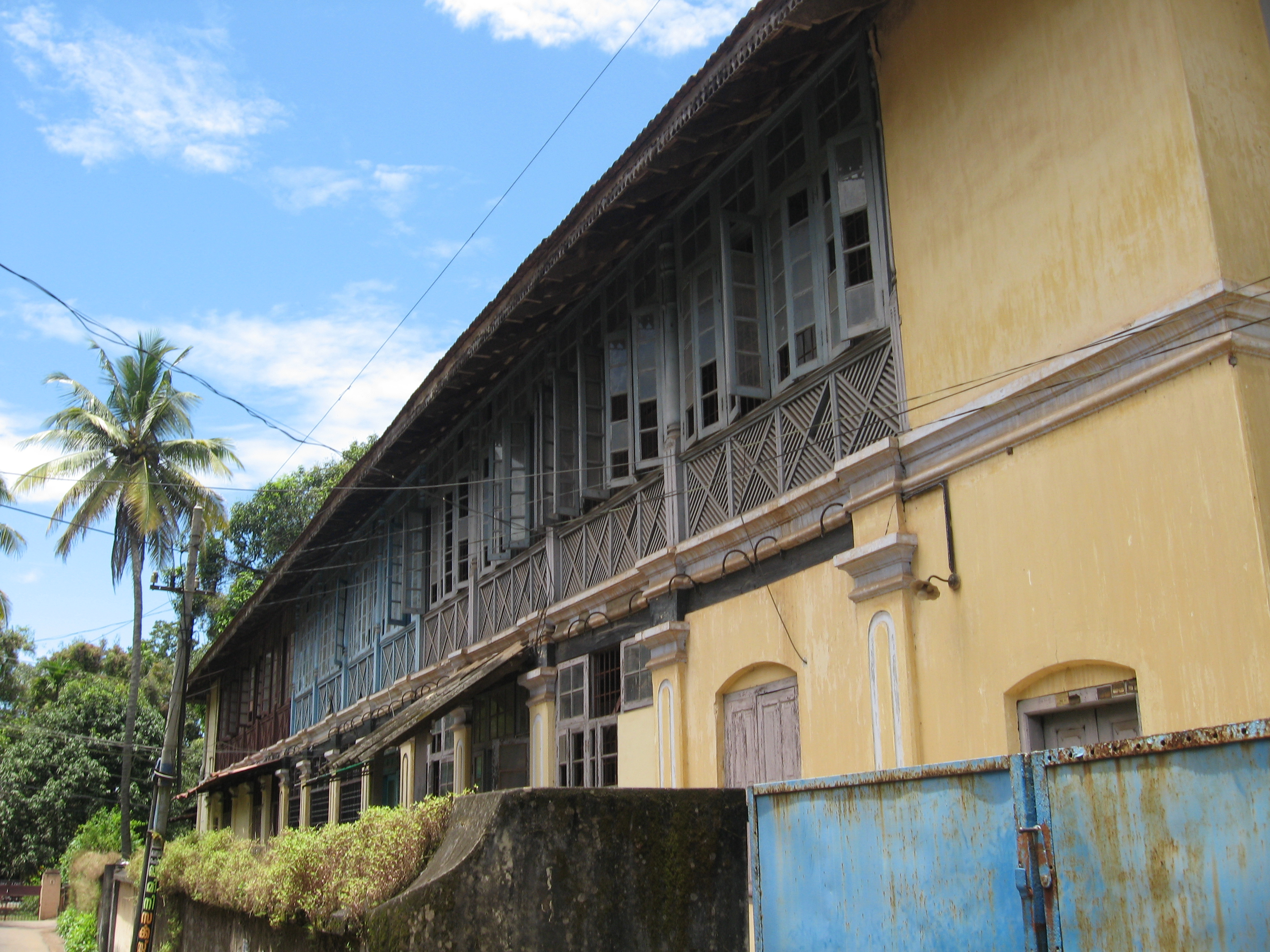
Edoop Palace (North), Thripunithura.

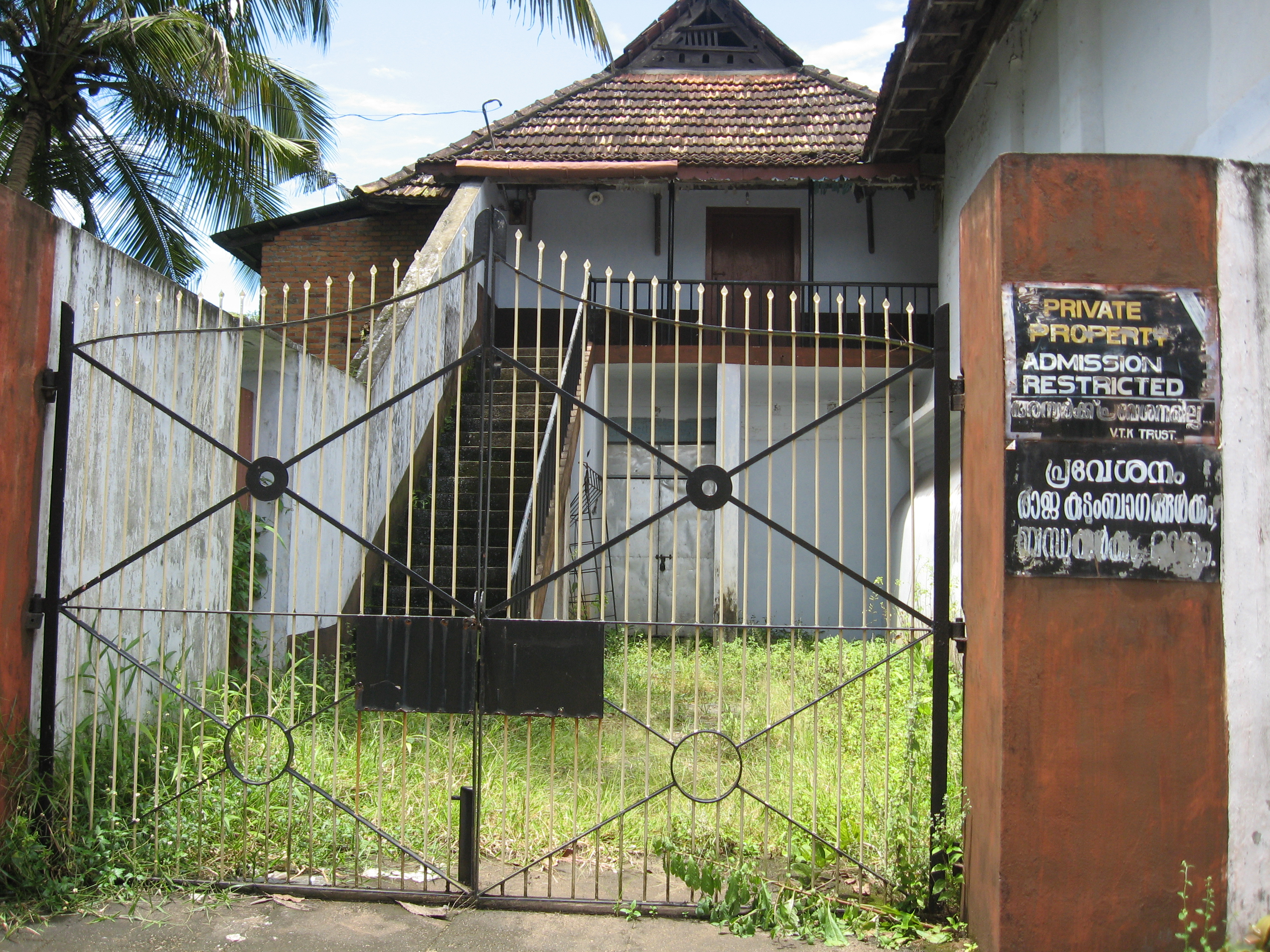
Thattu Malikka or Royal Balcony for Royal Family to view Sree Poornathrayesa temple festivals

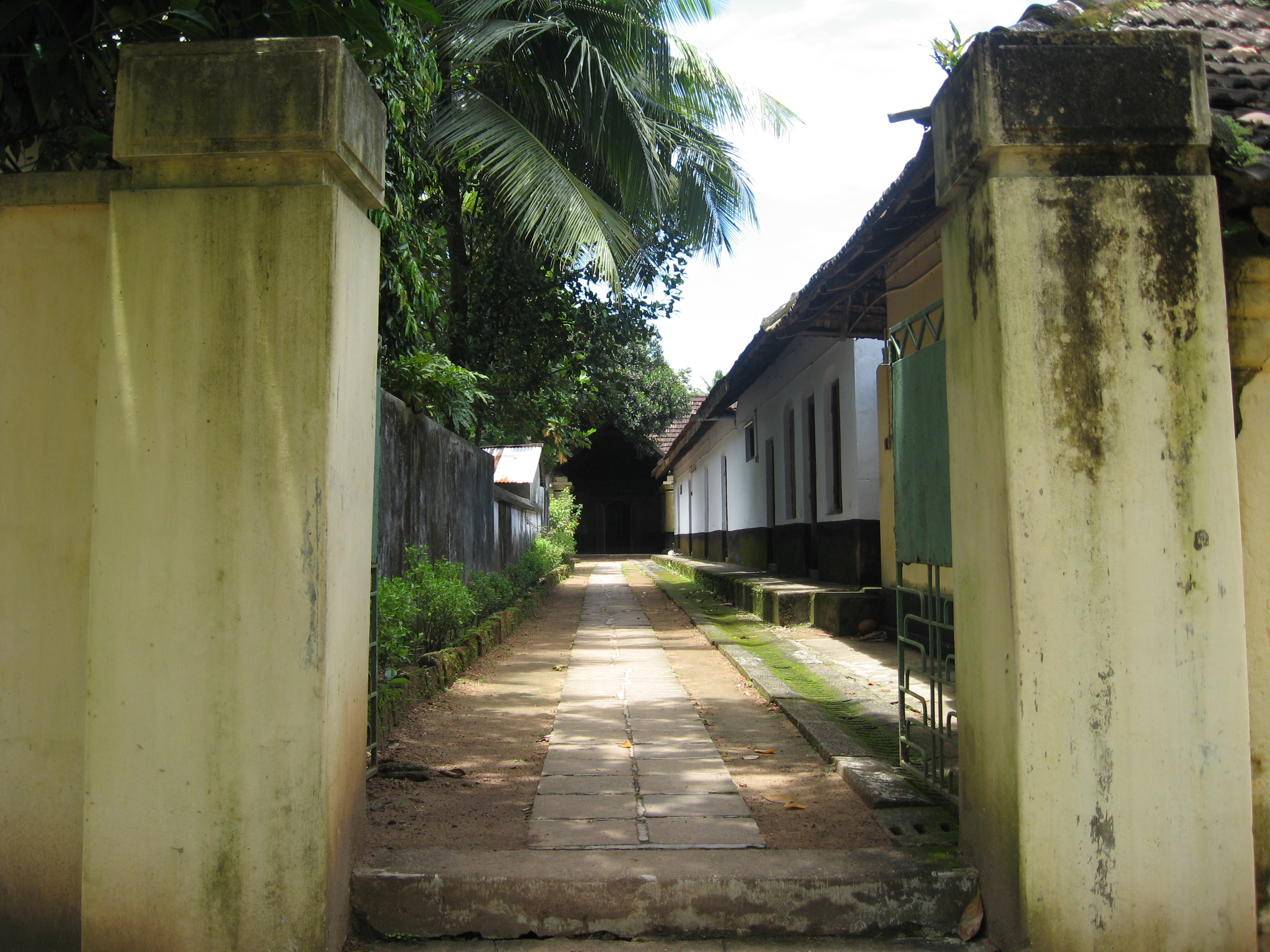
The entrance to Amma Thampuran Kovilakam (Palace No 31M), the ancestral home of Cochin Royal Family, near Sree Poornathrayesa temple
