= Places of worship in Ernakulam =

== Hindu Temples ==
- Ernakulam Shiva Temple Ernakulathapan temple (Shiva), Hanuman Temple, Muruga Temple. Located near Ernakulam South Railway Station (2 km )
- Valanjambalam Devi Temple (0.5 km from Ernakulam South Railway Station),
- Ravipuram Srikrishna Swamy Temple (1 km from Ernakulam South Railway Station)
- Pavakkulam Mahadeva Temple (0.5 km from Ernakulam north Railway Station)
- Paramara Devi Temple (Opposite Town Hall, and near Ernakulam Town Railway Station)
- Sree Poornathrayeesa Temple, Thrippunithura
- Thottathingal DhramaSastha Temple (SRM Road/Sastha Temple Road, near Platform no.2 of Ernakulam Town Railway Station)
- Kaattungal Devi Temple (Start point of Pachalam Railway Over Bridge, Pachalam)
- Shanmughapuram Temple (Shanmugha Puram Road, Pachalam)
- Perandoor Bhagavathy Temple (Perandoor Junction)
- Puthukulangara Devi Temple (Near Patanjali Yoga Vidyapeetham, Perandoor Road, Elamakkara)
- Mulakkal Devi Temple (Thannikkal, Swamipadi, Perandoor Road, Elamakkara)
- Sree Bala Bhadra Devi Temple (Near Perandoor Junction, Elamakkara)
- Punnakkal Bhagavathy Temple (Punnakkal Junction, Edappally Raghavan Pillai Road, Elamakkara)
- Puthukkalavattom Sree Swayambhu Mahadeva Temple (Puthukklavattom Road, Elamakkara)
- Chittoor Sri Krishna Temple (7 km from North Railway Station)
- TD Temple Cochin (15 km from South Railway Station)
- Edappally Krishna Temple (Opposite Changampuzha Park, Edappally)
- Maramkulangara Krishna Temple (Vennela-Thrippunithura Road)
- Keraleswaram Temple, Mulavukadu

== Mosques ==
- Kombara Juma Masjid, Kombara Jn., Ernakulam North, Ernakulam
- North Town Masjid, Opp. Specialists Hospital., Ernakulam North, Ernakulam
- Thevara Juma Masjid, Thevara., Ernakulam
- Thammanam Pallipady Ponnurunni Juma Masjid, Thammanam, Ernakulam
- Salafi Masjid, Vyttila Jn., Ernakulam
- Cutchi Hanafi Juma Masjid, Lobo Jn., Mattanchery, Ernakulam
- New Mosque, New Road, Mattanchery, Ernakulam
- Mahlara Juma Masjid, New Road Jn., Mattanchery, Ernakulam
- Ilayakovilakam Juma Masjid, Star Jn., Mattanchery, Ernakulam
- Hudha Masjid, New Road, Mattanchery, Ernakulam
- Amaravathy Juma Masjid, Amaravathy., Ernakulam
- Pattalam Juma Masjid, Pattalam, Fort Kochi, Ernakulam
- Pettah Juma Masjid, Main Road., Pettah Jn., Tripunithura, Ernakulam
- Juma Masjid, Tripunithura, Market Jn., Tripunithura, Ernakulam
- Madavana Juma Masjid, Madavana, Panangad Road, Ernakulam
- Kanjiramattom Juma Masjid, Kanjiramattom., Ernakulam

== Churches ==
- Assemblies of God in India, Kakkanad
- Basilica of Our Lady of Snows, Pallippuram
- CSI Immanuel Church, Ernakulam
- Eloor St Gregorios Malankara Orthodox Church
- India Pentecostal Church of God, Fortkochi
- Kalamassery St George Malankara Orthodox Church
- Karingachira Syrian Orthodox cathedral
- Little Flower Church, Elamkulam
- Malankara Syriac orthodox theological Seminary Mulanthuruthy, Ernamkulam
- Mar Yohannan Nepumsianose Syro-Malabar Catholic Church, Konthuruthy, which houses the tomb of Mar Varghese Payyappilly Palakkappilly
- Marthoman Cathedral, Mulanthuruthy
- Nadamel Marth Mariam Syrian Orthodox Church
- Padamukal St Johns Baptist Malankara Orthodox Church, Kakkanad
- Palarivattom St George Malankara Orthodox Church
- Patriarch Ignatius Zaka I Iwas Syrian Orthodox Centre, puthencruz
- Salem Mar Thoma Church, Ernakulam
- St. Antony's Shrine, Kaloor
- St. Francis Assisi Cathecdral, Ernakulam
- St George Hebron Syrian Orthodox Church
- St. George Syro-Malabar Catholic Forane Church, Edappally
- St Gregorios Malankara Orthodox church, Elamkulam
- St.Joseph's Church, Vazhakala
- St. Jude Church, Karanakodam
- St. Marys Soonoro Patriarchal Cathedral Elamkulam, Kochi
- St. Mary's Soonoro Syrian Orthodox Cathedral, Elamkulam
- St. Mary's Syrian Orthodox Cathedral, Morakkala (Since AD 905)
- St. Mary's Syro-Malabar Catholic Cathedral Basilica, Ernakulam
- St. Mary's Orthodox Cathedral, Marine Drive, Ernakulam
- St.Michael's Church, Chembumukku
- St.Patrick's Church, Vytilla
- St.Raphael's Church, Thykoodam
- St. Thomas Evangelical Church of India
- St. Thomas Marthoma Church Kalamassery
- Thamarachal Valiyapally
- The Pentecostal Mission, Edappally
- The Pentecostal Mission, Kakkanad
- Thevara St Thomas Malankara Orthodox Church
- Thripunithura St Gregorios Malankara Orthodox Chapel
- Vallarpadam Church Basilica of Our Lady of Ransom, Vallarpadam-Ernakulam
- Vettikal Dayara (First Dayara in Malankara Est. AD 1100) under Malankara Orthodox Church
- Vytila St Gregorios Malankara Orthodox Church

== Jain Temples ==
- Dharmanath Jain Temple
- Shri Vasupujya Swami Shwetambar Jain Temple
- Shri Mahaveer Swami Digambar Jain Temple

== Synagogues ==
- Ernakulam Kadavumbagam Synagogue
- Ernakulam Thekkumbhagam Synagogue
- Kadavumbhagam Mattancherry Synagogue
- Thekkumbhagam Mattancherry Synagogue
- Paradesi Synagogue

== Gurdwara ==
- Gurudwara Sri Guru Singh Sabha, Kochi (Cochin)
