= Changampuzha Nagar =

Changampuzha Nagar, Kalamassery, Kochi ച്ങമ്പുഴ നഗർ
- Neighbourhood
- Location within Kochi
- Coordinates: 10.040111°N 76.319611°E
- Country: India
- State: Kerala
- District: Ernakulam
- Named for: Changampuzha Krishna Pillai

Government
  - Type: Kalamassery Municipality
  - Body: Changampuzha Nagar Residents Association

Languages
  - Official: Malayalam
- Time zone: UTC+5:30 (IST)
- PIN: 682033
- Telephone code: 91-484
- Vehicle registration: KL-7
- Lok Sabha constituency: Ernakulam
- Kerala Legislative Assembly constituency: Aluva

Changampuzha Nagar Residents Association Ground

Changampuzha Nagar is a prominent and planned residential area in Kalamassery in the city of Kochi, Kerala, India. The Residential area lies between Kalamassery municipal town hall and Pathadippalam near the National Highway 544 and is the major residential area in Kalamassery and Ernakulam. Changampuzha Nagar was developed by Kerala State Housing Board in 1975 and named after the great poet Changampuzha Krishna Pillai. There are about 600 houses in Changampuzha nagar with three children's parks one football ground, School building, Post Office (pin code is 682033), Ration shop, recreation club, Indoor shuttle court, library, clean and wide roads. This was once a rubber estate with an area, developed into a colony in the 70's, with houses developed into three types, EWS, LIG and MIG residential houses made like Panampilly Nagar and Gandhi Nagar, Kochi .

Changampuzha Nagar is known for the following personalities, Cartoonist Yesudasan, Kalamandalam Hyderali, P. Rajeev, Ancel Edwin, GPC Nair, C.T. Antony, K.George, C.K. Antony, Thonakkal Narayanan, Dr. N. Anandavally etc.

== Changampuzha nagar residents association (CNRA) ==
The Changampuzha nagar residents association (CNRA) is one of the oldest resident associations in Kerala formed in the year 1978. There are other active organizations in Changampuzha Nagar like the Elders forum, Women's association and three Kudumbasree units. The place also offers the services and facilities of hospitals, super markets, banks, doctors, architect's, advocates, consultants, beauty saloons, fitness centres, automobile dealerships etc.
