= Vadakkunnathan Temple =

Ancient Hindu temple dedicated to Shiva

Vadakkumnathan Temple
- വടക്കുംനാഥൻ ക്ഷേത്രം - Vadakkumnāthan Kshētram
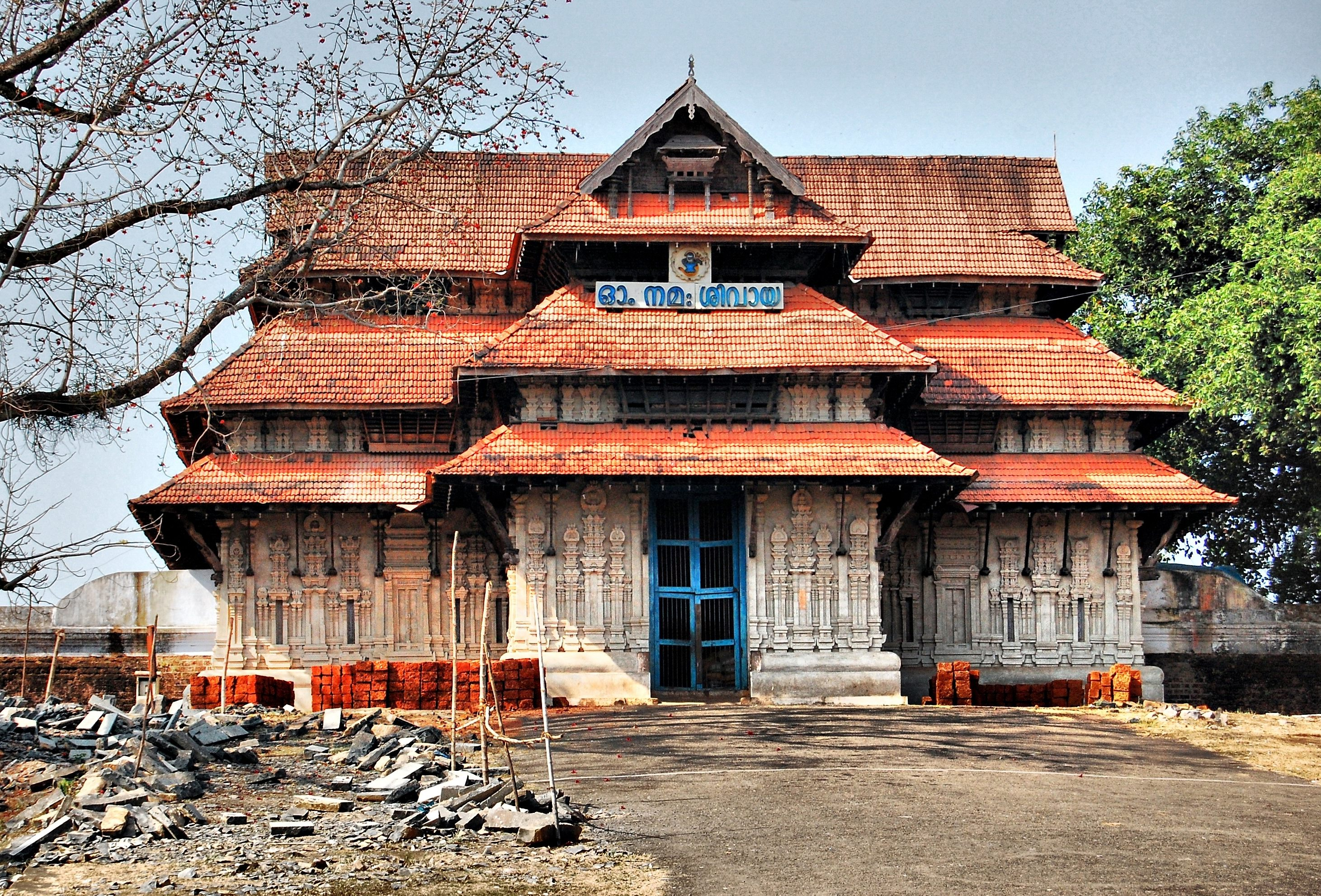
- South Nada entrance of the temple

- Location in Kerala Vadakkunnathan Temple (India)

Religion
- Affiliation: Hinduism
- District: Thrissur
- Deity: Shiva; Parvati; Shankaranarayana; Vishnu (As Rama); Ganesha
- Festivals: Thrissur Pooram; Maha Shivaratri; Navaratri; Thiruvathira

Location
- Location: Thrissur
- State: Kerala
- Country: India
- Interactive map of Vadakkumnathan Temple
- Coordinates: 10°31′28″N 76°12′52″E

Architecture
- Type: Traditional Kerala style
- Creator: Parashurama
- Completed: Unknown

Specifications
- Temple: 3
- Monument: 1

Website
- sreewadakkunathantemple.org

The Vadakkumnathan Temple is an ancient Hindu temple dedicated to Shiva in Thrissur, in the Thrissur district of Kerala, India. The temple is a classical example of the architectural style of Kerala and has one monumental tower on each of the four sides in addition to a koothambalam. Mural paintings depicting various scenes from the Mahabharata can be seen inside the temple. The shrines and the Kuttambalam display vignettes carved in wood. The temple, along with the mural paintings, has been declared as a National Monument by India under the AMASR Act. According to popular local lore, this is the first temple built by Parashurama, the sixth avatar of Vishnu. Thekkinkadu Maidan, encircling the Vadakkumnathan Temple, is the main venue of the renowned Thrissur Pooram festival.

In 2012, the Archaeological Survey of India (ASI) has recommended 14 sites, including Vadakkumnathan Temple and palaces, from Kerala to include in the list of UNESCO World Heritage Sites. The temple is also the first one among the 108 Shiva Temples in ancient Kerala, established by Parashurama, and is mentioned in the Shiva Temple Stotra as Shrimad-Dakshina Kailasam, meaning 'Mt. Kailash of the South'.

== Legend ==
Legends regarding the origins of the Vadakkumnathan Temple are briefly narrated in the Brahmanda Purana and these legends are referenced in some other works as well. Though these accounts differ with respect to certain details, they are all in agreement regarding the central theme that the temple was founded by Parashurama. According to lore, Parashurama requested the Lord of oceans Varuna to bring forth a new piece of land from the waters. Varuna complied and the land created became Kerala.

Parashurama now wanted to consecrate this new land. So he went to Mount Kailasa to his guru, the god Shiva and requested him to take abode in Kerala and thereby bless the region. Shiva accompanied by his wife Parvati, his sons Ganesha and Subrahmanya and his routinue went along with Parashurama, to oblige his disciple. Shiva stopped at a spot, which is now Thrissur, for his seat. Later he and his party disappeared and Parashurama saw a bright and radiant Lingam (non-anthropomorphic icon of Shiva) at the foot of a huge banyan tree. This place where Shiva manifested his presence as a lingam is known in Sanskrit as the Sri Moola Sthana.

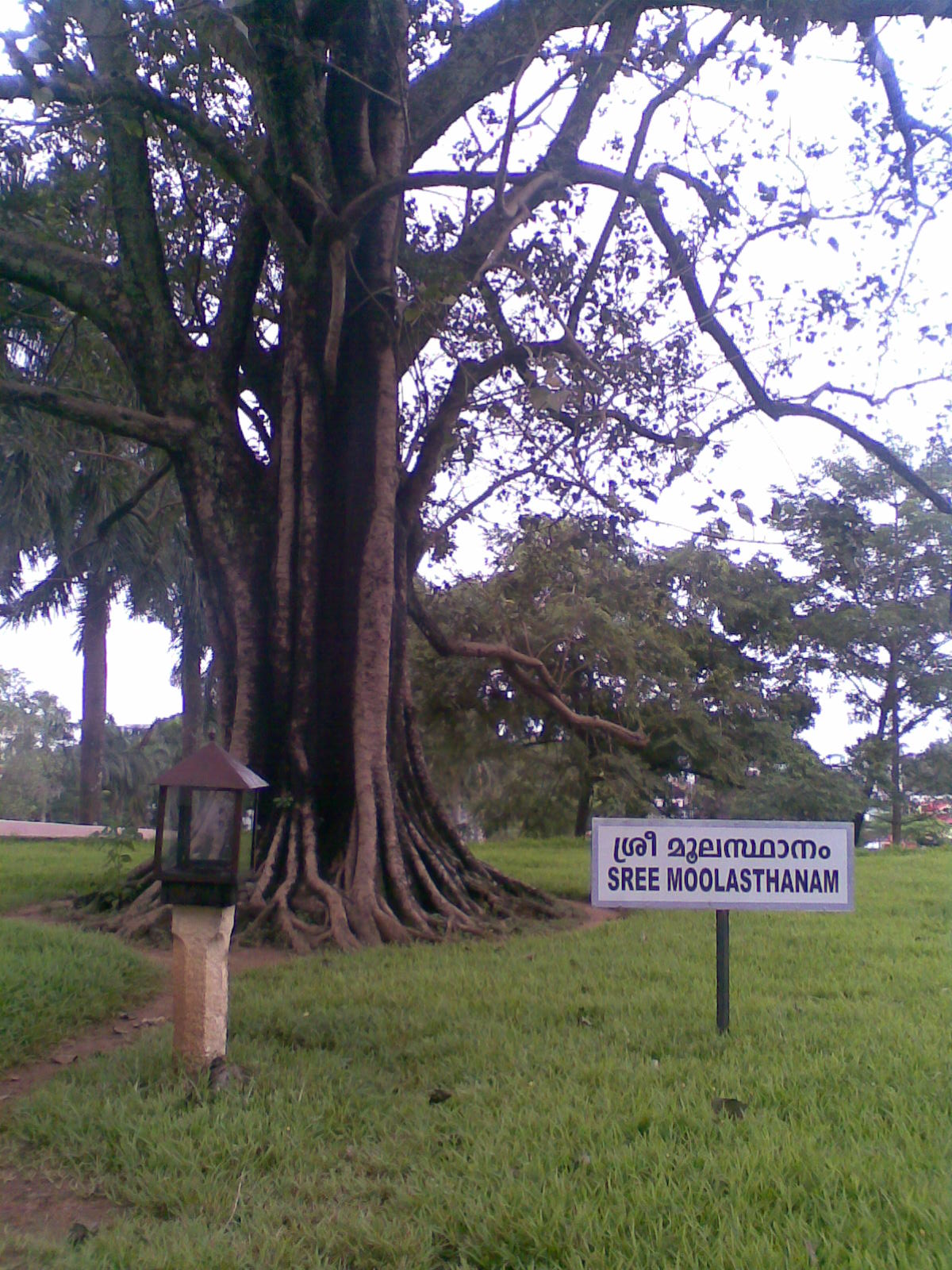
The Sri Mula Sthana – the original site of the linga, before it was moved to the current temple.

For sometime, the lingam remained at Sri Moola Sthana at the foot of a huge banyan tree. The ruler of Cochin Kingdom then decided to shift the lingam to a more appropriate place and construct a temple around it. Arrangements were soon made for the new installation. But there was an initial difficulty. The lingam could not be removed without cutting off a large part of the banyan tree. This created the risk of damaging the lingam due to falling branches. As the ruler remained confounded, the Yogatirippadu came forward with a solution. He lay over the lingam so as to cover it completely with his body and asked the men to cut the tree. The cutting began and to everyone's astonishment, not a single branch of the tree fell anywhere near the deity. The deity was moved according to prescribed rituals and installed in the new place where it remains to this day. Subsequently, a temple was built around the deity, according to the rules specified in the Shastras.

== History ==
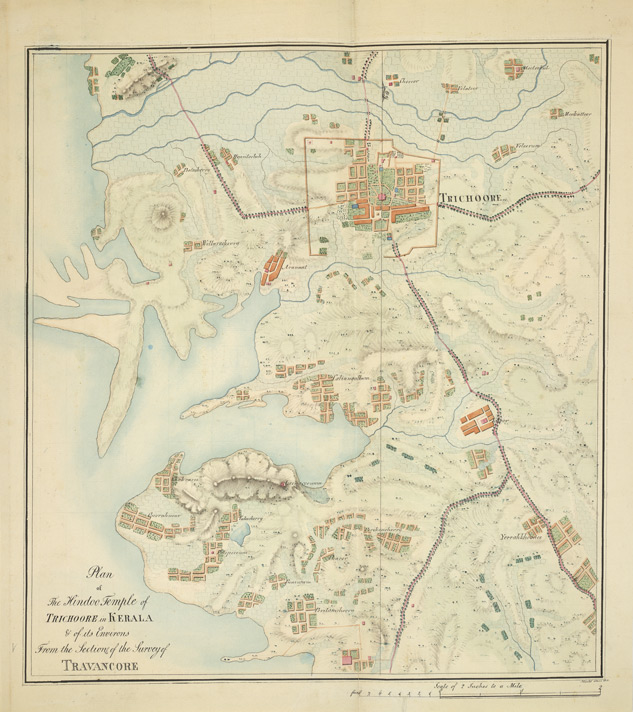
Map of City of Thrissur with Vadakkumnathan Temple prepared by John Gould in 1816

The temple was built at the time of Perumthachan from Parayi petta panthirukulam. It is said that Perumthachan lived during the second century; so the Koothambalam may be more than 1,600 years old. According to Malayalam historian V. V. K. Valath, the temple was a pre-Dravidian Kavu (shrine). In the early days, Paramekkavu Bhagavathi shrine was also situated inside the Vadakkumnathan temple. Subsequently, a new temple was built outside and the idol of the goddess was moved to that location. For comparison, Koodalmanikyam Temple, Kodungallur Bhagavathy Temple and Ammathiruvadi Temple, Urakam are older than the Vadakkumnathan temple, according to temple documents. Some suggest that there have also been influences from Buddhist and Jain temples.

=== Yogiatiripppads ===
The Nambudiris who were entrusted with looking after temple affairs were called Yogiatiripppads. When Nambudiris gained control of the region, the temple also came under their domain. The Yogiatiripppads were elected from Thrissur desam. Prior to Sakthan Thampuran's reign, the Yogiatiripppad system declined. Later, the Maharaja of Cochin gained presiding authority over the temple.

=== Adi Shankara ===
Adi Shankara is believed to have been born (8th Century AD) to Shivaguru and Aryamba of Kalady consequent to their prayers to Lord Vadakkumnathan, as amsavatara of Shiva. The couple devoutly prayed for 41 days at the temple. Legend has it that Shiva appeared to the couple in their dreams and offered them a choice. They could have either a mediocre son who would live a long life or an extraordinary son who would die early. Both Shivaguru and Aryamba chose the latter. In honour of Shiva, they named their son Shankara. According to legend, Adi Shankara attained videha mukti ("freedom from embodiment") at the Vadakkumnathan temple. One narrative as expounded by the Keraliya Shankaravijaya, identifies the temple as his place of death. He also established four Mutts at Thrissur, famously known as Edayil Madhom, Naduvil Madhom, Thekke Madhom and Vadakke Madhom

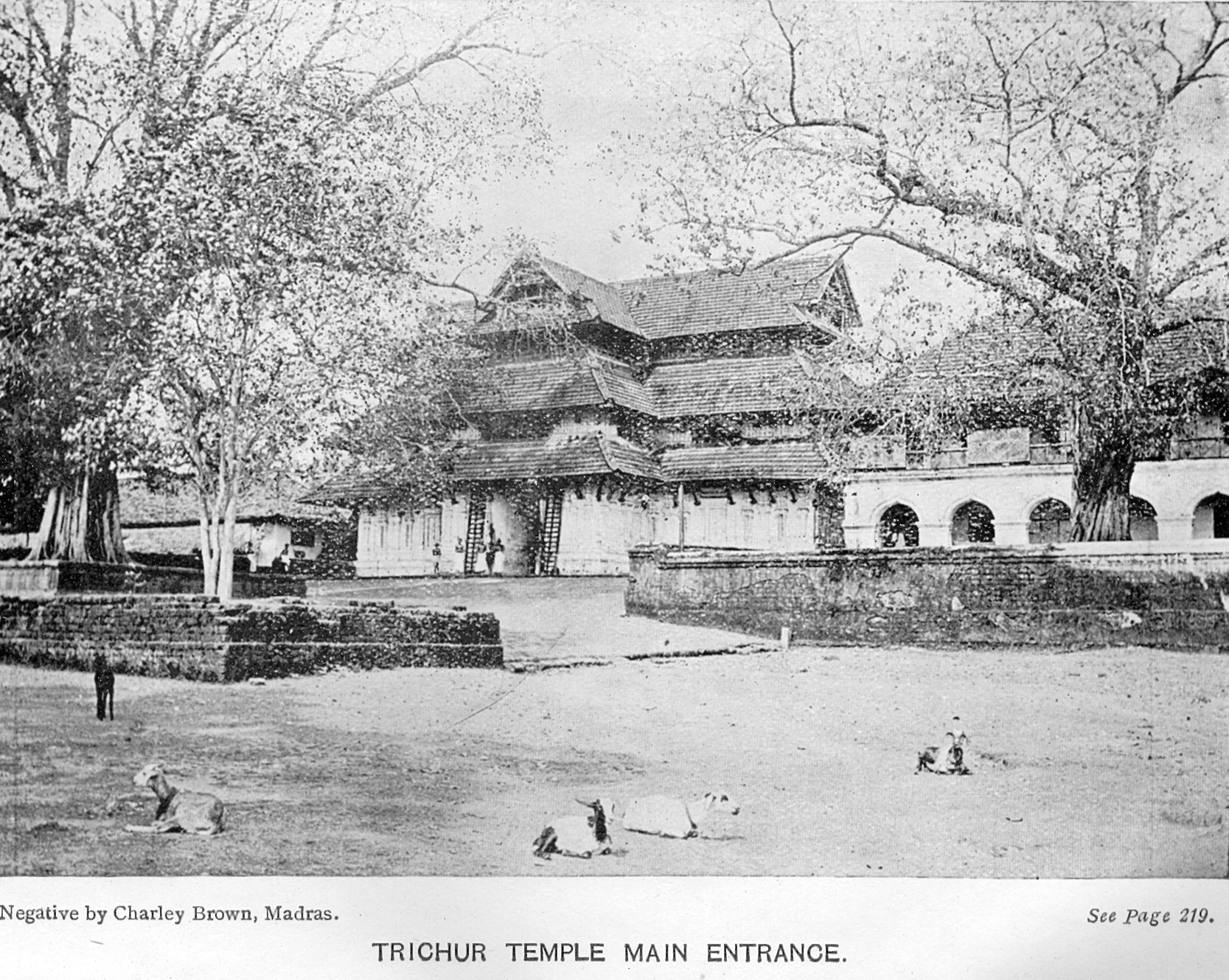
A rare picture of main entrance of Vadakkumnathan Temple taken in 1913 seen from Swaraj Round from Illustrated Guide to the South Indian Railway, printed by Hoe and Coat the 'Premier Press'.

=== Invasion of Tipu Sultan ===
During the invasion of Tipu Sultan, the temple was not attacked by Tipu's Army. Even though Tipu Sultan destroyed many temples in Thrissur district at that time, he never touched Vadakkumnathan Temple. According to historical accounts, when Tipu Sultan was marching towards the Travancore lines, known locally as Nedumkotta, he had a short stay at Thrissur city from 14 to 29 December 1789. In order to feed his Army, he had borrowed cooking vessels from Vadakkumnathan Temple. Before leaving Thrissur city, he not only returned the vessels, but presented the temple with a large bronze lamp.

=== Zamorin of Calicut ===
During 1750 to 1762, the temple affairs were conducted by Zamorin of Calicut who attacked Thrissur and took control of the temple and the city. In 1762 with the help of Kingdom of Travancore, Maharaja of Cochin regained control over Thrissur and the temple.

=== Sakthan Thampuran ===
When Sakthan Thampuran, ascended the throne of Kingdom of Cochin, he changed the capital of Kingdom of Cochin from Thripunithura to Thrissur as the King had a personal relationship with Vadakkumnathan Temple. He later cleared the teak forest around the temple and introduced the famous Thrissur Pooram festival. The King's personal interest in the temple also changed the fortune of the city.

== Architecture ==
The temple is situated on an elevated hillock in the centre of Thrissur City and is surrounded by a stone wall enclosing an area of nearly 9 acres (36,000 m^{2}). Inside this fortification, there are four gopurams facing four cardinal directions. Between the inner temple and the outer walls, there is a spacious compound, the entrance to which is through gopurams. Of these, the gopurams on the south and north are not open to the public. The public enter either through the east or west gopuram. The inner temple is separated from the outer temple by a broad circular granite wall enclosing a broad corridor called Chuttambalam. Entrance into the inner temple is through a passage through the corridor.

=== Deities ===
Layout of Sanctum sanctorums in Vadakkumnatha Temple

In the northern side, the main sanctum is a circular structure with main deity of the temple Shiva facing west and behind him, his consort Parvati facing east, denoting their combined form Ardhanarishvara. Shiva, is worshipped in the sanctum as a 16-foot-high (4.9 m) lingam, which is covered entirely by a mound of ghee, formed by the daily abhishekam (ablution) with ghee over the years. The lingam is embellished with thirteen cascading crescents of gold and three serpent hoods on top. According to traditional belief, the ghee-covered lingam represents the snow-clad Mount Kailash, the abode of Shiva. This is the only temple where the lingam is not visible. It is said that the ghee offered here for centuries does not have any foul odour and it does not melt even during summer. But even then, it breaks in parts during some periods. Such periods are considered to be beneficial or harmful depending upon the part and area of the breaking.

Located on the verandah of the Nalambalam is a large white bull Nandikeswara, Shiva's vehicle. The two-storied rectangular shrine of the god Rama facing west is located in the south. Between these two sanctums (srikovils) stands a third one, circular and double-storied in shape, which is dedicated to Shankaranarayana, the combined form of Shiva and Vishnu, facing west. There are mukhamandapams (halls) in front of all the three central shrines. It is said that Hanuman resides in the mandapam in front of Rama's sanctum.

The two important murals – which are more than 350 years old – in the temple, Vasukisayana (reclining Shiva) and Nrithanatha (20-armed Nataraja), are worshipped daily. The temple also houses a museum of ancient wall paintings, wood carvings and art pieces of ancient times.

Ganesha shrine is positioned facing the temple kitchen. The offering of Appam (sweetened rice cake fried in ghee) to him is one of the most important offerings at the temple. Propitiating him here is believed to be a path to prosperity and wealth.

In the outer temple, there are shrines for Krishna (Gosala Krishna or Gopala Krishna; Krishna as a cowherd), Nandikeswara, Parashurama, Simhodara (Shiva's gana), Ayyappa (Shiva and Vishnu's son, especially venerated in Kerala), Vettekkaran (Shiva as a hunter), Serpent deities and Adi Shankara. Also, there are places here to worship Kashi Vishwanatha, Nataraja, Ramanathaswamy, Goddess Bhadrakali (of Kodungallur Temple), Bharata (of the Koodalmanikyam Temple) and Goddess Durga (of Ammathiruvadi Temple).

Outside the main temple, there are shrines for the two sons of Shiva and Parvati – Subrahmanya (Kartikeya) and Ganapathi (Ganesha). Both these temples are of much recent origin, having built only in 1940's. Both are located beneath two giant banyan trees, namely Manikantan Aal and Naduvil Aal. The Subrahmanya Temple under Manikantan Aal, which is located at the south-western side of Vadakkumnathan Temple, was built by some local devotees who were furious by the continuous speeches of political leaders during Indian Independence Movement happening under Manikantan Aal. The idol here represents Lord Subrahmanya with his two consorts – Valli and Devasena, sitting over a peacock. He is installed facing east. Palabhishekam (Pouring milk over the idol) and Panchamrutham are the main offerings of the temple. Thaipooyam is the main festival here. Along that, Shashti days important for Lord Subrahmanya. The Ganapathi temple under Naduvil Aal, located exactly to the west of Vadakkumnathan Temple, is actually just a small setup, without any sanctum or other traditional temple features. The main deity, Lord Ganapathi, is installed facing west, in a mode of welcoming those entering the city from the western side. Vinayaka Chathurthi is the main festival in the temple.

=== Koothambalam ===
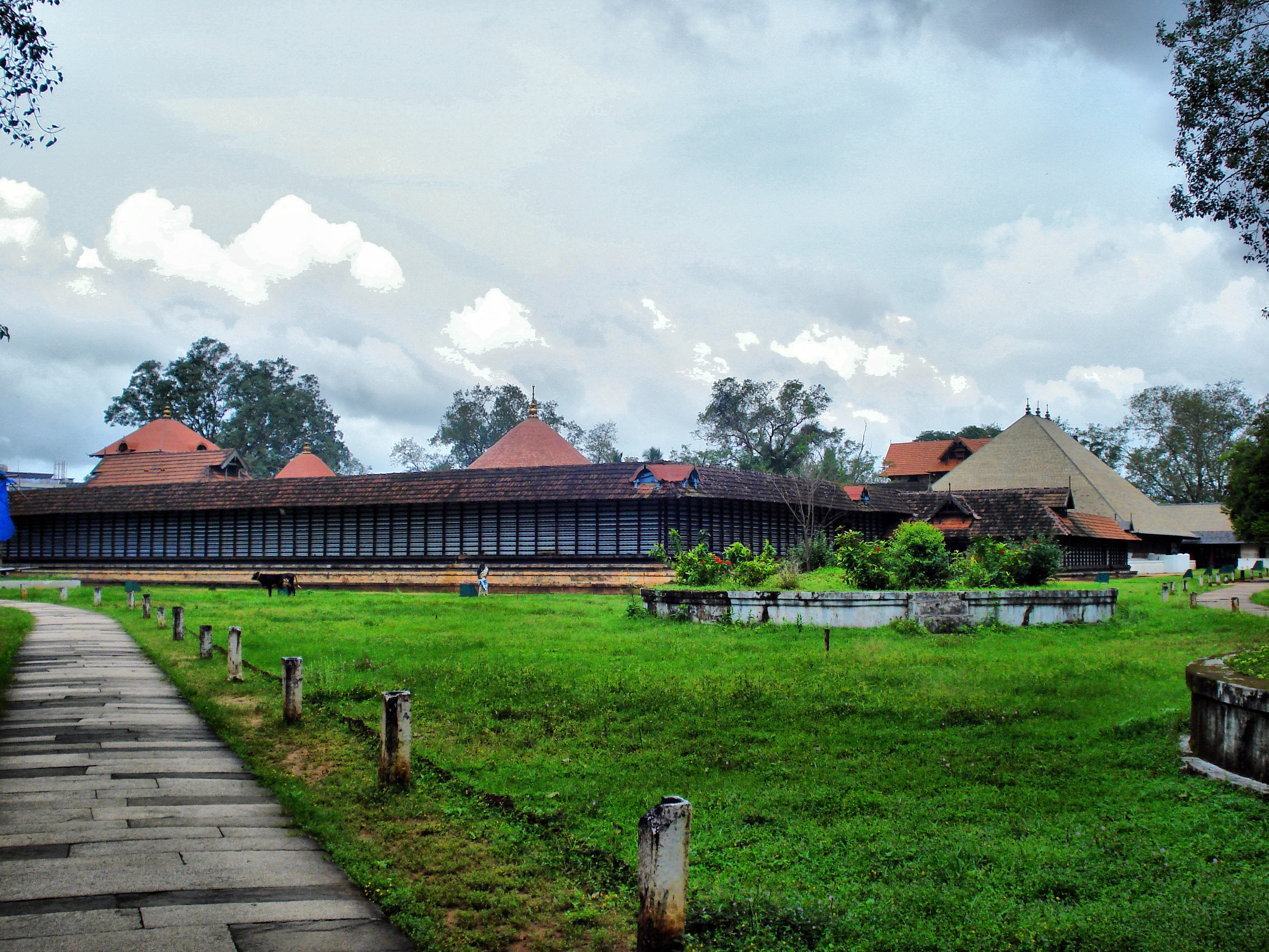
Interior of Vadakkunnathan Temple and in the right side is the Koothambalam.

The temple theatre, known as Koothambalam, has four magnificent gateways called Gopurams and the lofty masonry wall around the temple quadrangle are imposing pieces of craftsmanship and skill. The Koothambalam is used for staging Koothu, Nangyar Koothu and Koodiyattam, an ancient ritualistic art forms of Central Kerala. According to folk lore, before the new Koothambalam was built, there used to be an old and dilapidated structure. Then Diwan T. Sankunni Menon ordered to demolish the structure and construct a new Koothambalam. He gave this task to Velanezhy Nambudiri, a famous Thachushasthranjan or master craftsman, who built the structure. Velanezhy Illom is in Venganellur Gramam, Chelakkara town.

== Festivals ==
=== Maha Shivaratri ===
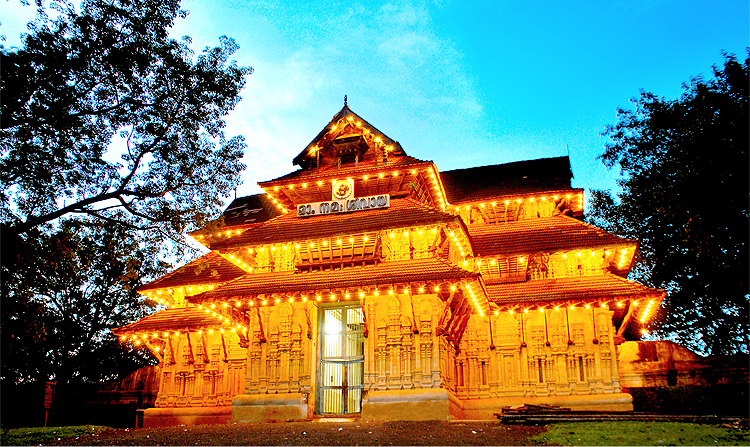
Vadakkumnathan Temple's Thekke Gopura Vathil lighted up during the Maha Shivaratri festival

Maha Shivaratri is the main festival which is celebrated in the temple. Cultural and musical programmes are held in the temple premises. Around one lakh temple lamps are lighted in the festival. On this day, there is the continuous abhishekam on the lingam with ghee and tender coconut. The temple is not closed in the night, and there will be special poojas with abhishekam on the day.

=== Aanayoottu ===
The Aanayoottu of feeding of elephants, is the second biggest festival held in the temple. The devotees refer to elephants as the elephant-headed god Ganesha's incarnation. The festival falls on the first day of the month of Karkkidakam of the Malayalam calendar (July). It has been the regular annual practice at the temple for the last 20 years to conduct a large-scale Ashta Dravya Maha Ganapathy Havana and Aanayoottu on the first day of the Karkidakom month of the Malayalam calendar. It involves a number of unadorned elephants being positioned amid a multitude of people for being worshipped and fed. A large number of people throng the temple to feed the elephants.Gajapooja also is conducted once every four years.

=== Thrissur Pooram ===
Thrissur Pooram is called the mother of all Poorams in Kerala. In Malayalam it is called "poorangalude pooram". This is conducted in the Malayalam month of Medam. The deities from Parmekavu and Thiruvambady temple along with other small poorams come engage in festivities in front of Vadakkumanathan. It is a 36 long hour festival which attracts thousands of devotees and tourists. The main attractions of Pooram are Madathilavaravu panchavadhyam, Elanjithara melam, Kudamattam and Vedikettu.

== Conservation ==
A comprehensive conservation/ restoration of the temple adhering to the traditional architectural principles of Kerala was completed in 2015. The main Temple enclosure including the sanctum, the Naalambalam, Vilakkumaadam, outer shrines and the landscape was restored in the project, whereas the work on the Gopurams is ongoing as of 2025. Stakeholders include Cochin Devaswom Board, Archaeological Survey of India, VGKT – Vengugopalaswamy Kanikaryam Trust (corporate Social Responsible Project of TVS Motor Company), dd Architects – the local project coordinator, and Kanippayur Krishnan Namboodirippad, Vastu shastra Consultant. As a functioning religious space and a protected monument, the project was proposed by balancing conservation principles and traditional practices. After a detailed decay analysis, it was decided to follow the traditional systems of building and ritualistic conservation of Jeernodharana (Deliverance from Decay) as per the local treaties and traditions. The works were carried out by following non-destructive methods and by preserving the authenticity of the existing structures. Indigenous knowledge systems have been utilized, thereby reviving age-old construction and conservation techniques. A deliberate revival of the tangible and the intangible took place when the ancient techniques and planning principles were reused in the project to work with traditional materials that were prepared using authentic and historical methods. All stages of the project kick-started with appropriate rituals connected to the temple. Local units of measurement and principles as explained in Vastu shastra and Thachusastra were implemented. Traditional lime plastering and masonry techniques and carpentry were efficiently utilised with the help of 300-plus skilled craftsmen. The Project received the UNESCO Asia Pacific Award of Excellence for Cultural Heritage Conservation in 2015.

== See also ==
- 108 Shiva Temples
- Temples of Kerala
- Hindu temples in Thrissur Rural
- Guruvayur Temple
