= Gandhi Nagar, Kochi =

Housing colony in Kochi

Gandhi Nagar is one of the two earliest (the other being Panampilly Nagar) planned housing colonies in Kadavanthra region of Kochi city in the state of Kerala, India. It was developed by the end of the 1970s by Greater Cochin Development Authority, the statutory body overseeing the development of Kochi. What is now Gandhi Nagar was, in the 1970s, abandoned paddy fields, and wet lands. The land was developed by filling with earth from the hills of Kakkanad, and a planned housing colony was developed.

== Amenities ==
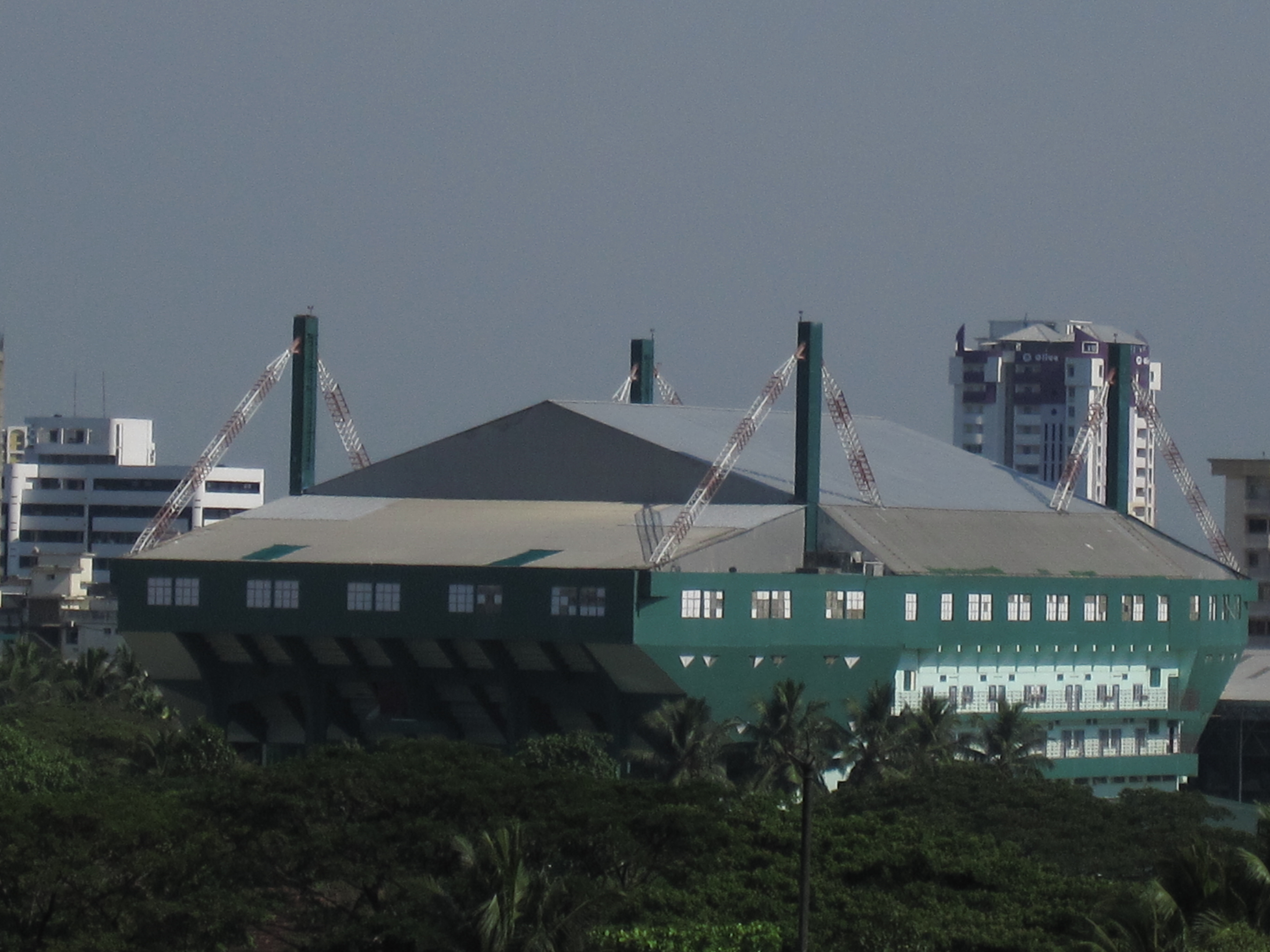
Rajiv Gandhi Indoor Stadium, Kadavanthra

Gandhi Nagar, being a planned housing colony has a handful of amenities which are generally uncommon for housing colonies in the state or even in Kochi. The amenities include:

- Regional Sports Centre and the Rajiv Gandhi Indoor Stadium.
- Gandhinagar Fire Station. The city's major fire station.
- Indira Gandhi Co-operative Hospital
- Kendriya Vidyalaya, Ernakulam, a central school owned by the Government of India.

== Other institutions ==
Even though Gandhi Nagar, Kadavanthra is a planned housing colony, being in the heart of the city of Kochi, it is home for certain government organizations such as:

- Headquarters of the Kerala State Co-operative Consumers Federation Limited
- Headquarters of the Kerala State Civil Supplies Corporation Limited
- A manufacturing unit of the Kerala Small Industries Development Corporation Limited
- Office of the Pollution Control Board
- The Canteen Stores Department of the Indian armed forces.

== The housing scheme based on 'income groups' ==
In the original plan of this colony, the housing regions where divided into three based on the income group of the potential occupants, and houses were built in these regions on four different formats, for four different income groups. It may be now perceived a quite unaesthetic, or unpolitical, but these houses were, in fact, named to bear the category of these income groups. They were named: EWS (Economically Weak Section), LIG (Lower Income Group), MIG (Middle Income Group), and HIG (High Income Group). Although the expansions of these abbreviations are now forgotten, these houses still bear these abbreviations in their house numbers. The same scheme was followed in Panampilly Nagar and Changampuzha Nagar (KSHB) as well. Even though the same format of housing was replication in later projects of GDCA like the South Commercial, and in Kakkanad, the income group based naming was not followed.

== In popular culture ==
- Gandhinagar 2nd Street, a 1986 Malayalam film directed by Sathyan Anthikad had name of this colony as its title. The film featured the life-style in a typical urban housing colony in Kochi in 1980s, which the rest of the state, then mostly unurbanized, perceived with a critical eye, and Gandhi Nagar was more of a stereotype for such an urban colony.
- In the film In Harihar Nagar (1990), a Malayalam film written and directed by Siddique-Lal, the writers created a fictitious housing colony out of both Gandhi Nagar and Panampilly Nagar and tried to portray the urban-life of Kochi of the 1980s. The film was shot in both these colonies.
- In the film 2 Harihar Nagar (2009), sequel to In Harihar Nagar
