= Kangarappady =

Kangarappady Kangarappadi
- Northern Suburban
- Location in Kerala, India Kangarappady (India)
- Coordinates: 10.044754°N 76.355152°E
- Country: India
- State: Kerala
- District: Ernakulam

Government
  - Type: Municipality
  - Body: Kalamassery Municipality
- Elevation: 2 m (6.6 ft)

Population
  - Total: 13,984

Languages
  - Official: Malayalam, English
- Time zone: UTC+5:30 (IST)
- Postal code: 682021
- Telephone code: 0484241****
- Vehicle registration: KL-07
- Website: http://www.kalamasserymunicipality.in/

Kangarappady is a suburban region in Kochi, Kerala, India.

== Institutions ==
The Government Medical College, Ernakulam, Ayurveda Hospital, Veterinary Hospital, Kangarappady Mini Town Hall, State Bank of India, Sree Narayana Upper Primary School, Holycross Convent School], and Vidyodaya School.

== Location ==
Kangarappady is 5 kilometer away from Edappally Toll junction and LuLu International Shopping Mall, 3 Kilometer away from Kakkanad Civil Station, InfoPark, Kochi and SmartCity, Kochi. it is 14 kilometer away from High Court of Kerala, 11 kilometer away from Kaloor and Ernakulam Town Railway station and 2.5 kilometer away from seaport-airport road. Cochin International Airport is only 18 kilometer away.

== Administration ==
Kangarappady comes under the Kalamassery Legislative Assembly, Kalamassery Municipality and Trikkakara Police Station of Ernakulam District. Vadacode sub post office (682021) is located at Kangarappady Junction. The municipal ward number 17, 18, 19 and 20 belong to the kanagarappady region.Kangarappady is the only locality which owns a Govt Ayurvedic Hospital in the Municipality Limits. Kangarappady is the fastest developing town in Kalamassery Municipality. The Municipality has new plans for the overall development of the Kangarappady region to make it as major attraction of the municipality.

== Nearby places ==
Ponnakudam Bhagavathy Temple is one of the oldest temple in Kalamassery Municipality. The temple is located at Thevakkal in Kanayannur taluk of Ernakulam district in South Indian state of kerala. The temple is situated about 1 Km from Kangarappady and 2 km from Kalamassery Government Medical College. Ponnakudam Bhagavathy Kshetram, is a traditional Hindu temple, dedicated to goddess Sree Vana Durga The major attraction of the temple is surrounded by thick forest. Many followers of the theory of kerala's genesis by parasurama firmly believe that he had established 108 Durga temples, 108 Siva temples, numerous sastha temples, Ponnakudam Bhagavathi temple is one among the 108 Durga temples.
