= Kalamassery Mahaganapathy Temple =

Hindu Temple

- Location in Kerala

Religion
- Affiliation: Hinduism
- Deity: Ganapathy

Location
- Location: Kalamassery
- State: Kerala
- Country: India
- Interactive map of Kalamassery Mahaganapathy Temple
- Coordinates: 10.0638°N 76.3226°E

Architecture
- Type: Kerala
- Creator: N Reghunatha Menon
- Completed: 1981

Kalamassery Mahaganapathy Temple (Malayalam: കളമശ്ശേരി മഹാഗണപതി ക്ഷേത്രം) is a Hindu temple in North Kalamassery dedicated to Ganapathy (Ganesha).

== History ==
The temple was built in 1981 by late Mr. N Reghunatha Menon, a prominent and pious person who lived in the town of Kalamassery. For a large period of time the temple existed as a basic concrete structure and housed the shrines of Ganapathy, Subramanian and Navagrahas only. In the year 2000 Menon embarked on a project to build additional shrines for other Gods and Goddesses and also renovate the temple with traditional architecture. Menon died the following year, after which the management of the temple passed onto the hands of his children. The children continued further renovation of the temple, and also set up the Mahaganapathy Temple Trust which would manage the temple. At present the temple is a very popular center of worship for people living in and around Kalamassery, and several festivals and events are conducted throughout the year.

== Temple structure ==
The temple has a simple construction with the original shrines of Ganapathy and Subramanian (Kartikeya) (along with the Navagraha) housed inside two concrete structures located side by side facing west.

Between these two shrines is located the stairs leading to the more recent elevated structure which houses the shrines of other deities. These shrines, added in 2000, are dedicated to Shiva, Parvathi, Rama, Dakshinamurthi and Chandikeshwara.

The entire building covers an area of around 5,000 square feet (460 m^{2}); there are no outer walls. There is a Peepal tree in front of the Ganapathy shrine. The temple complex includes a ground behind the building.

The busy Eloor-Kalamassery road runs just in front of the temple. The space from the temple's front and the road is so short (around 30 feet) that it has earned the deity the nickname of 'Road-side Ganapathy'.

== Events ==
It has been the regular annual practice at the Mahaganapathy temple for the last 20 years to conduct a large-scale Ashta Dravya Maha Ganapathy Havana and Aanayoottu on the first day of the Karkkidakom month of the malayalam calendar. The devotees refer to elephants as Ganapathy's incarnation. Gajapooja (worship of elephants) also is conducted once every four years.

== See also ==
- Temples of Kerala
