= Kerala State Co-operative Consumers Federation Limited =

Kerala State Co-operative Consumers’ Federation Limited
- Abbreviation: Consumerfed
- Formation: 4 September 1965; 61 years ago
- Headquarters: Gandhi Nagar, Kochi, Kerala, India
- Website: consumerfed.net

Kerala State Co-operative Consumers’ Federation Limited, branded as Consumerfed, is the apex body of the consumer co-operatives in the state of Kerala, India. It is a co-operative apex organization in Kerala started in 1965. Its headquarter is situated at Kochi.
