= Koonamthai =

- village
- Location in Kerala, India Koonamthai (India)
- Coordinates: 10°2′0″N 76°18′0″E
- Country: India
- State: Kerala
- District: Ernakulam

Languages
  - Official: Malayalam, English
- Time zone: UTC+5:30 (IST)
- Postal code: 682024
- Vehicle registration: KL-07

Koonamthai is an area in the city of Kochi in Kerala, India. Situated around 8 km from the city centre, it is one of the wards in Kalamassery municipality.
