= St. Thomas Church, Kalamassery =

Coordinates: 10.054315°N 76.325423°E

St. Thomas Mar Thoma Church, Kalamassery
- St. Thomas Mar Thoma Church, Kalamassery
- Location: Kalamassery, Ernakulam District, Kerala
- Country: India
- Denomination: Mar Thoma Syrian Church
- Tradition: Syrian

History
- Founded: 1959

Architecture
- Completed: 1966

Administration
- Diocese: Kottayam Kochi Diocese

St. Thomas Marthoma Church Kalamassery, is a prominent Christian parish of the Kottayam – Kochi diocese under the Malankara Mar Thoma Syrian Church of Malabar. This parish forms the worship place for all the Marthomites in Changampuzha Nagar, Edapally, Muttam, NAD, Shanthinagar, North and South Kalamassery. The nearest Marthoma parishes are in Eloor, Palarivattom Kakanad and Aluva. The parish is currently led by Rev. P Y Mathew.

== History ==
In the year 1959, about nine families who were the part of Aluva Marthoma church started a small and active prayer group. They bought 27 cents of land near HMT Road, Kalmassery to construct a church building. The Most Rev. Dr. Philipose Mar Chrysostom Mar Thoma Valiya Metropolitan laid the foundation of the chapel in 1963. Later the chapel was elevated as parish in 1966. One of the major reconstruction of the church building was on 1997. The present strength of the parish is about 300 families and approximately 2000 members.

== Golden Jubilee ==
Since 2016 is the Golden Jubilee year for the parish, the Golden jubilee committee scheduled and charted numerous programs and events for one year. The program's were conceived under the leadership of Rev. Dr. John Joseph and Prof. M. Thomas Mathew. The parish also has initiated some of the major social causes during the Golden Jubilee year The golden Jubilee celebrations were inaugurated on 8 November 2015. The following are the notable initiatives

- † The pain and palliative program of the church - Friend in Need is a movement that take care of the sick and week people in the Kalamassery region.
- † Snehakoodu is a fellowship for the elderly people, where they gather and share their great moments and spent their time creatively.
- † Free Medical Consultation for the poor
- † Medical and poor aid program for education, marriages and homeless
- † Bazhaza – the distribution of school kits to children in tribal areas

The church witnessed the presence of eminent personalities, seminars, discussions and live music performances during the golden Jubilee year. The notable names are Alexander Jacob (police officer), Alphons Joseph, Benny Prasad, V. D. Satheesan, P. Rajeev, Fr. Bobby Jose Kattikad, Kochouseph Chittilappilly, Glorious Choir team etc. St Thomas Marthoma church Kalamassery organized a music show against drug abuse by Hillsong International Leadership College on 2 October 2016 at Ernakulam Durbar Hall ground, Cochin.

== Organizations ==
1. Edavaka Mission
2. Yuvajana Sakhyam
3. Pain & Palliative
4. Welfare Trust
5. Sevika Sangam
6. Sunday School
7. Young Couples association
8. Choir
