= Thekke Madhom =

Thekke Madhom (Malayalam: തെക്കേമഠം) is one of the four ancient South Indian madhoms that propagate Adwaita or Non dualism. It is located at Thrissur City in Kerala. Padmapadacharya was the first acharya of Thekke Madhom.
