= Government Medical College, Ernakulam =

Medical college in the state of Kerala

Coordinates: 10.0535°N 76.356°E

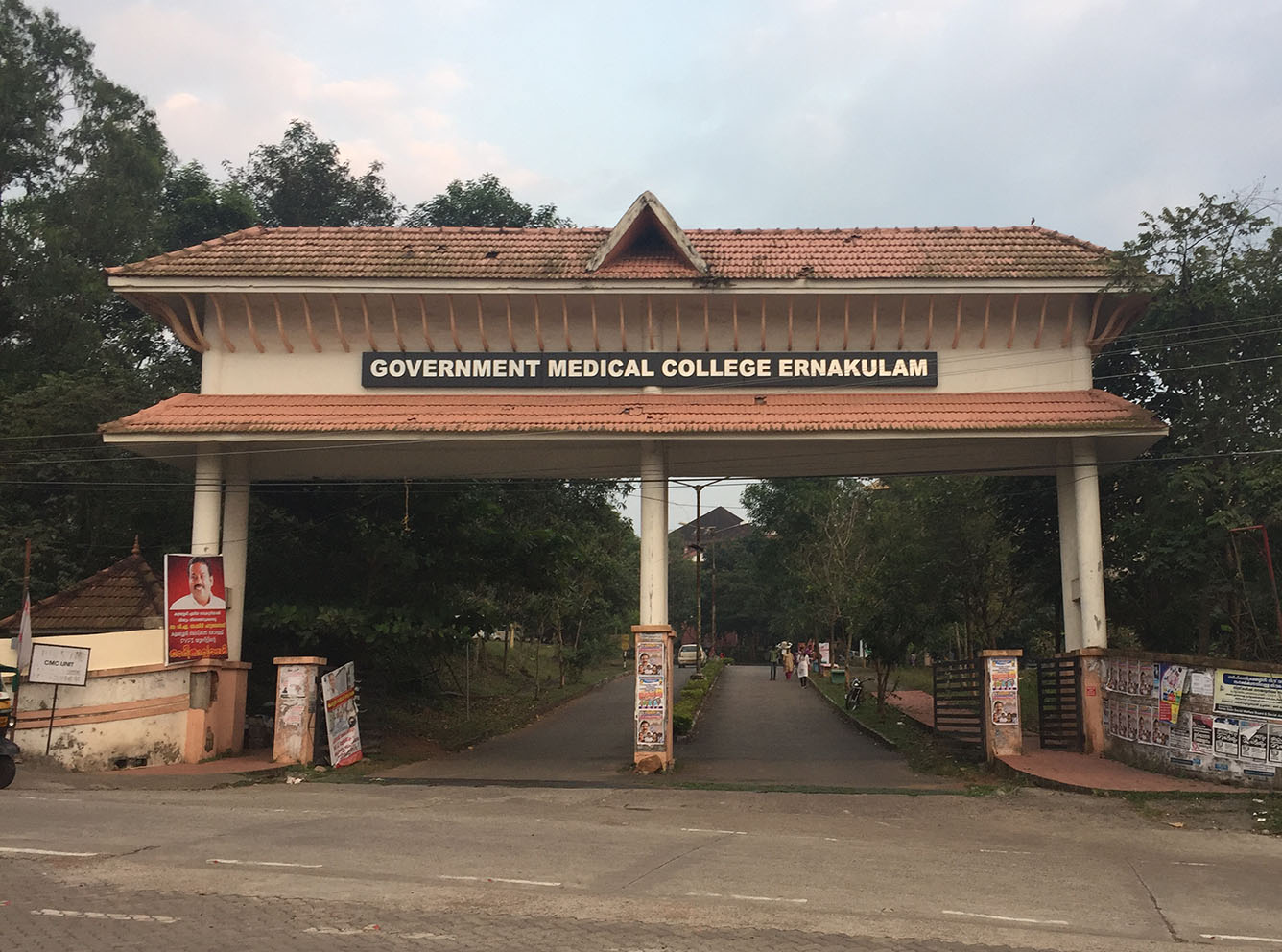
- Medical College campus main entrance
- Type: Government college
- Established: 1999; 27 years ago
- Academic affiliations: Kerala University of Health Sciences
- Principal: Dr. Anil Kumar
- Location: Kochi, Kerala, India
- Campus: Urban, 60 acres (24 ha)
- Administration: Department of Health and Family Welfare, Government of Kerala
- Website: cmccochin.org

Government Medical College, Ernakulam (previously Cochin Medical College) is one of the medical colleges in the state of Kerala situated at Kalamassery, Kochi. It was a government-owned institution established by the Co-operative Academy of Professional Education under the Department of Co-operation, Government of Kerala, established in 1999. The college has an intake capacity of 110 students (100 students till 2019) for the MBBS course each year. It was taken over by the Government of Kerala as a government institution on 11 December 2013. There are postgraduate courses in three clinical (Medicine, Pediatrics and Psychiatry) and two paraclinical departments (Pathology and Microbiology). It also includes the college of nursing, Biomedical engineering courses and Operation Theatre courses functioning in the college campus. The campus has a cafeteria, gymnasium, library, football stadium, basketball court, volleyball court and indoor badminton courts.

== History ==
The college initially functioned at General Hospital, Ernakulam, and Indira Gandhi Cooperative Hospital, Kochi and classes were conducted at Jawaharlal Nehru International Stadium complex, Kochi. Land was acquired at HMT Estate at Kalamassery and the foundation stone for the campus was laid by Shri E.K. Nayanar, the then Chief Minister of Kerala State. The college was shifted to the present campus at Kalamassery in 2004 and was inaugurated by Shri A.K. Antony, Chief Minister of Kerala. Dr P.G.R. Pillai was the founding principal of the college.

== The College ==
The college spreads around 60 acres of at Kalamassery in the outskirts of the city. The complex includes 700-bedded Medical College hospital, College of Nursing and the Cochin Cancer Research Centre. The campus also counts with furnished hostels for students, resident quarters and staff quarters.

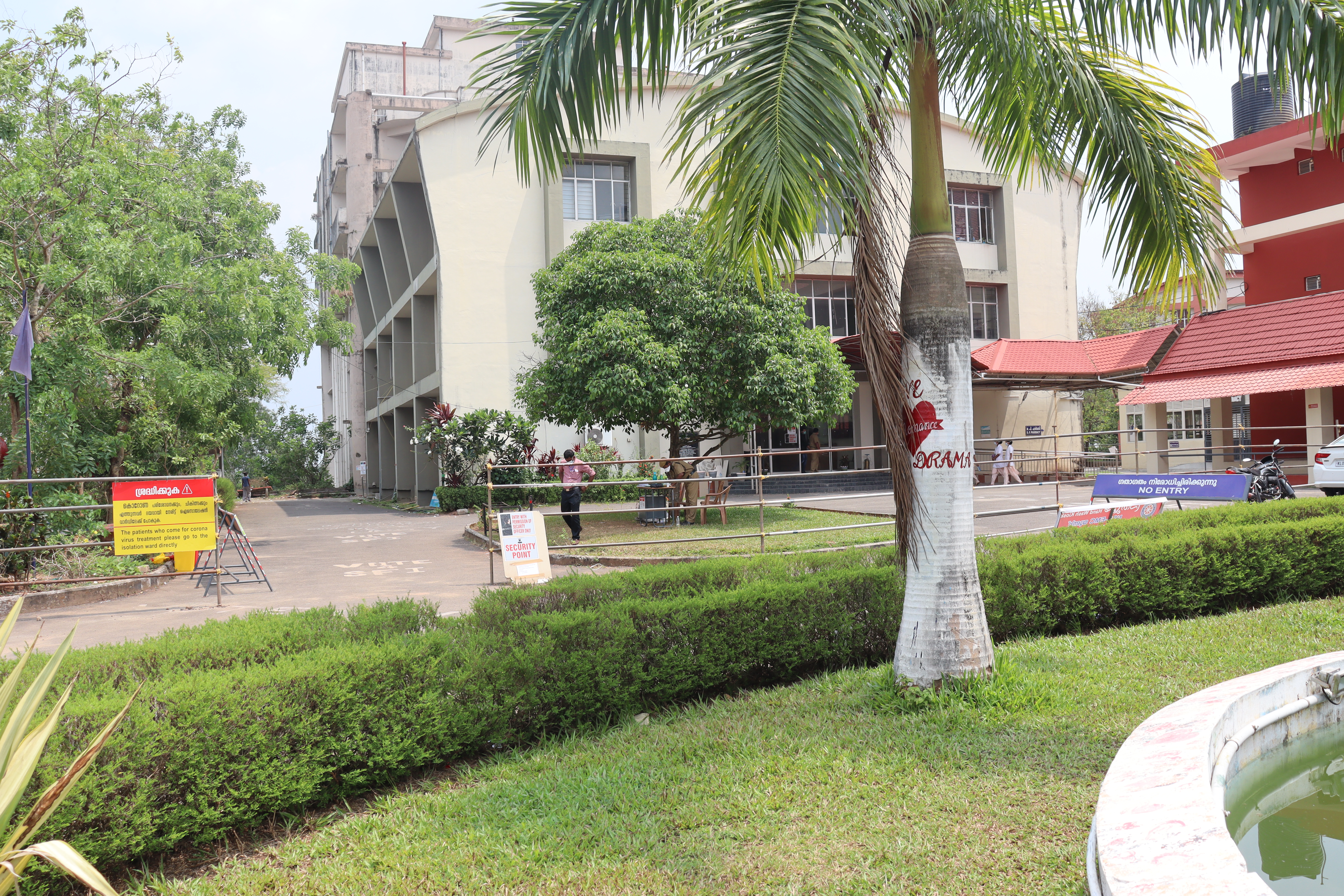
Administrative Block and Principal's Office

== Cochin Cancer Research Centre ==
Due to the alarming increase of cancer patient in the state, the Government of Kerala decided to set up a cancer research centre in the central part of the state. The foundation stone for the centre was laid on 18 August 2014. The total cost for the project was estimated to be around ₹3.95 billion (US$42 million).

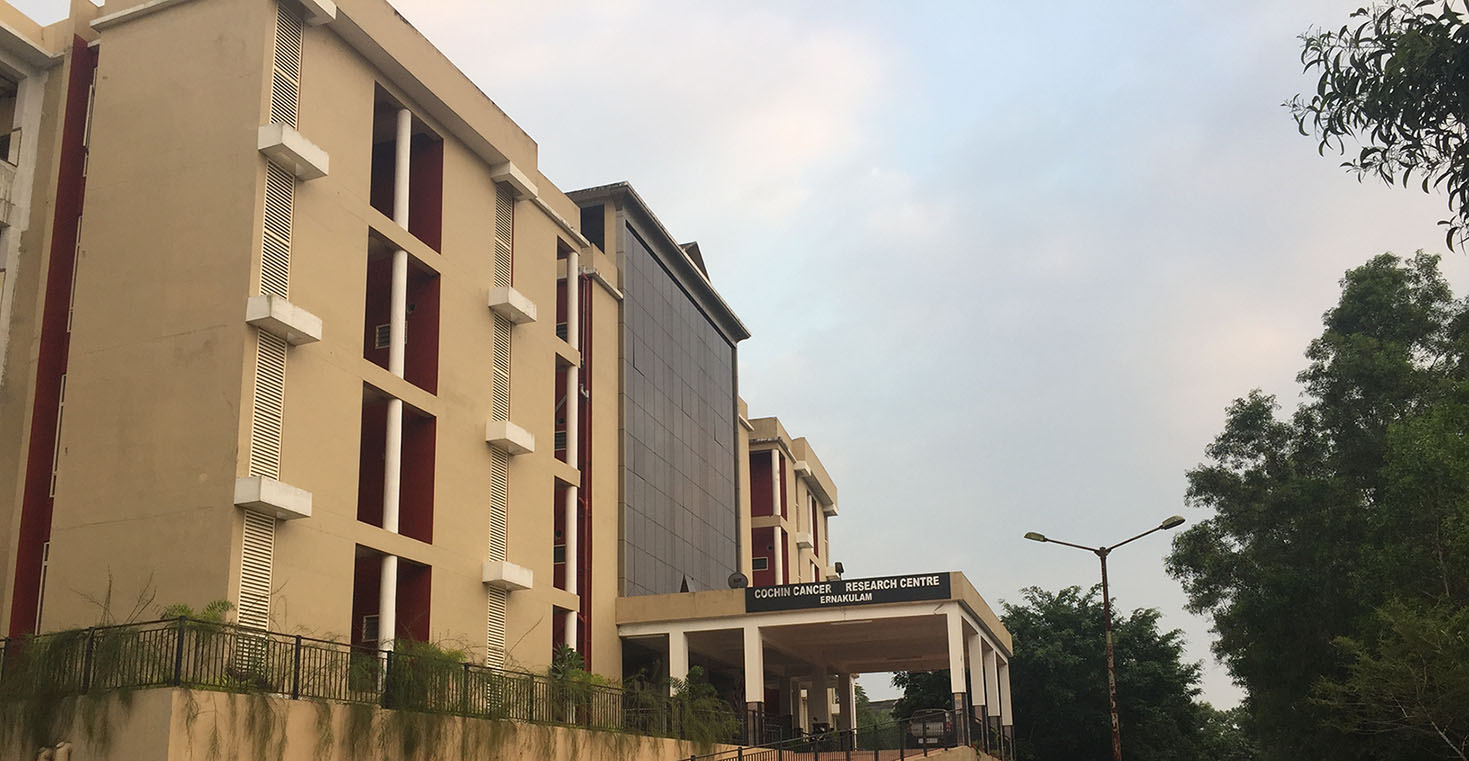
The Cochin Cancer Research Centre is situated inside the campus

== Departments ==
=== Preclinical ===
- Anatomy
- Physiology
- Biochemistry

=== Paraclinical ===
- Pathology
- Pharmacology
- Microbiology
- Forensic Medicine
- Community Medicine

=== Clinical Specialities ===
- General Medicine
- General Surgery
- Obstetrics and Gynecology
- Pediatrics and Neonatology
- Otorhinolaryngology
- Ophthalmology
- Orthopedics
- Dermatology
- Psychiatry
- Dentistry
- Radio diagnostics
- Anaesthesiology
- Respiratory medicine

=== Super Specialities ===
- Cardiology
- Neurology
- Nephrology

== Facilities ==
The Medical College Hospital complex consists of 700-bedded Wards, 24 hour Casualty, Medical ICU, Surgical ICU, Paediatric ICU, Neonatal ICU, Major & Minor operation theatres. There is also a specialised Burns Unit for providing advanced care to Burns patients. The hospital provides investigation facilities including MRI, CT, USG and all sort of laboratory services.

The Medical college hospital is equipped with 24 hour fully functioning blood bank.

=== RT-PCR Lab ===
A realtime Reverse Transcriptase -Polymerase Chain Reaction (RT-PCR) lab was set up in the hospital during the beginning stage of COVID-19 pandemic. The lab started functioning after getting approval from ICMR in April 2020.Viral Research and Diagnostics Laboratory (VRDL) presently functioning started from March 2026.

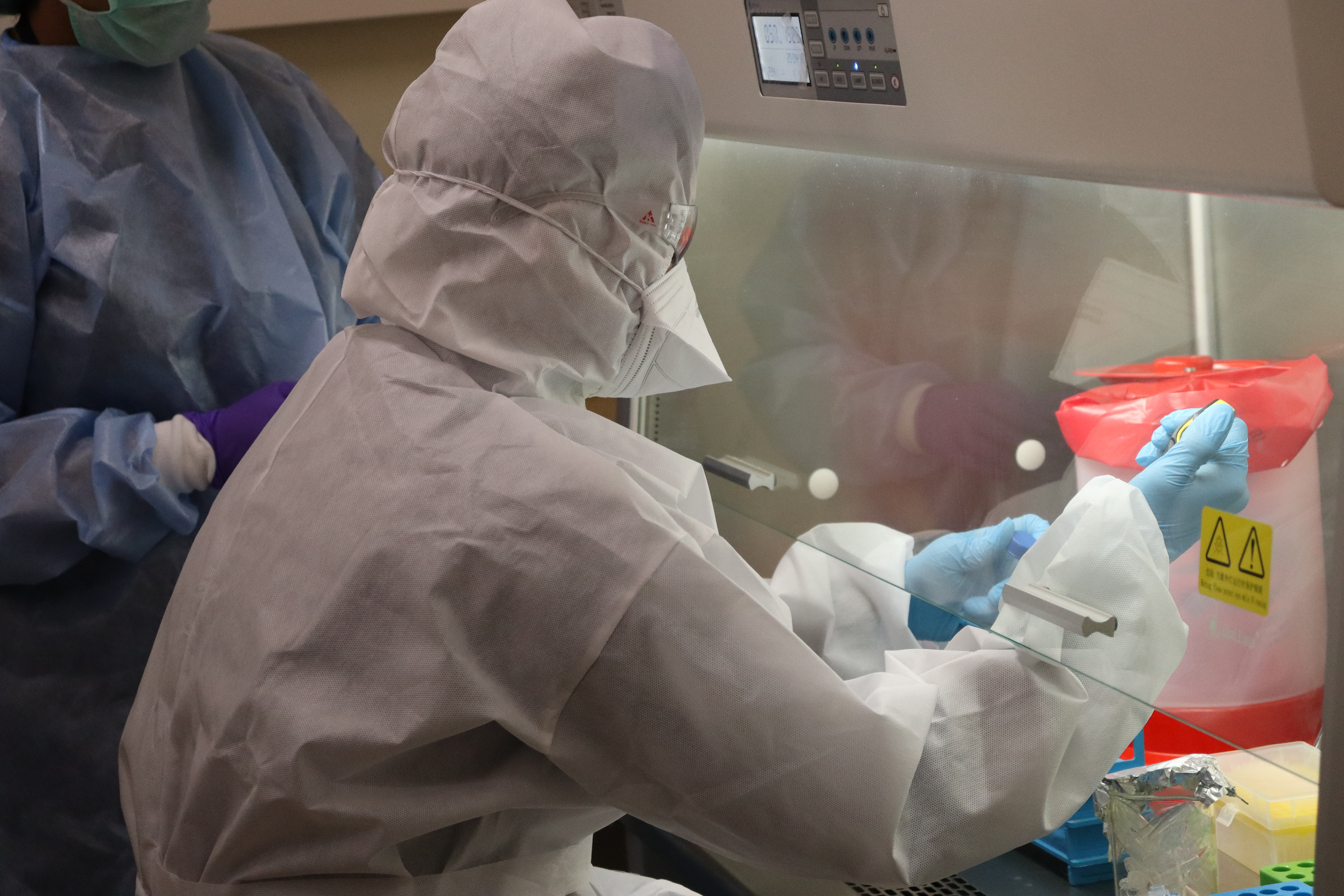
RT-PCR Lab in Medical College

== Achievements ==
=== Covid Care ===
The hospital was turned to a COVID care centre in Ernakulam district exclusively for COVID -19 patients on last week of March 2020. The facilities and treatment given in the hospital were praised internationally, after a UK citizen was discharged COVID negative.

==== Karmi Bot ====
The robot named ‘KARMI-Bot’ is used to assist patients at the medical college's COVID-19 isolation ward. The robot developed by ASIMOV Robotics, was donated to medical college by famous actor Mohanlal. The robot has fully autonomous features for dispensing food & water, disinfection, collecting trash and other features like video call.

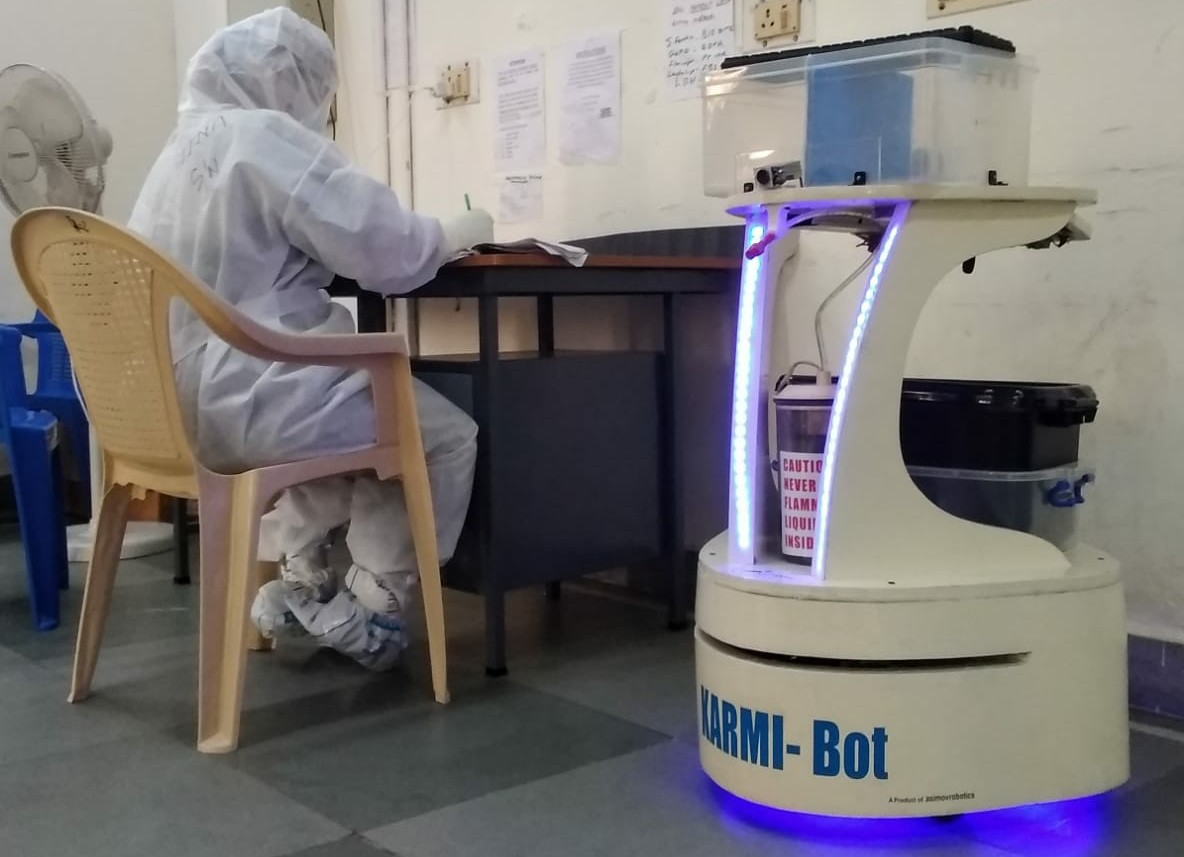
Karmi Bot in Medical College's Isolation ward

== Events and activities ==
=== Revera ===
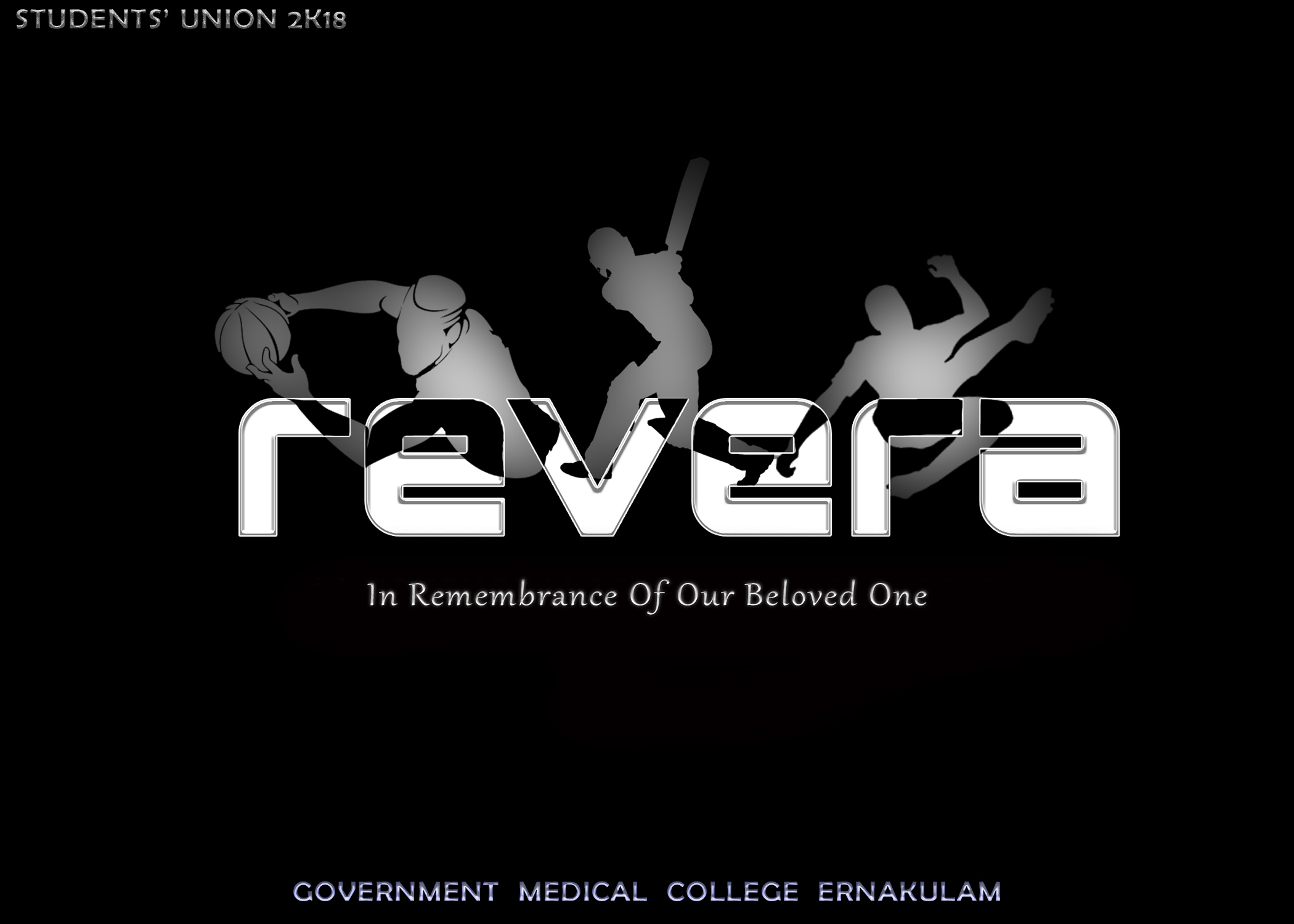
Revera Logo

The respective Student's Union of Government Medical College Ernakulam organises an inter-medical college sports event revera every year. It was started from 2018 (organised by SU2k18) onwards, which was a success with a lot of appreciations for the heavy participation, organization and the good conduct.

=== Graduation ===
Each year there will be separate graduation ceremonies of both MBBS and nursing graduates
