= Pathadipalam =

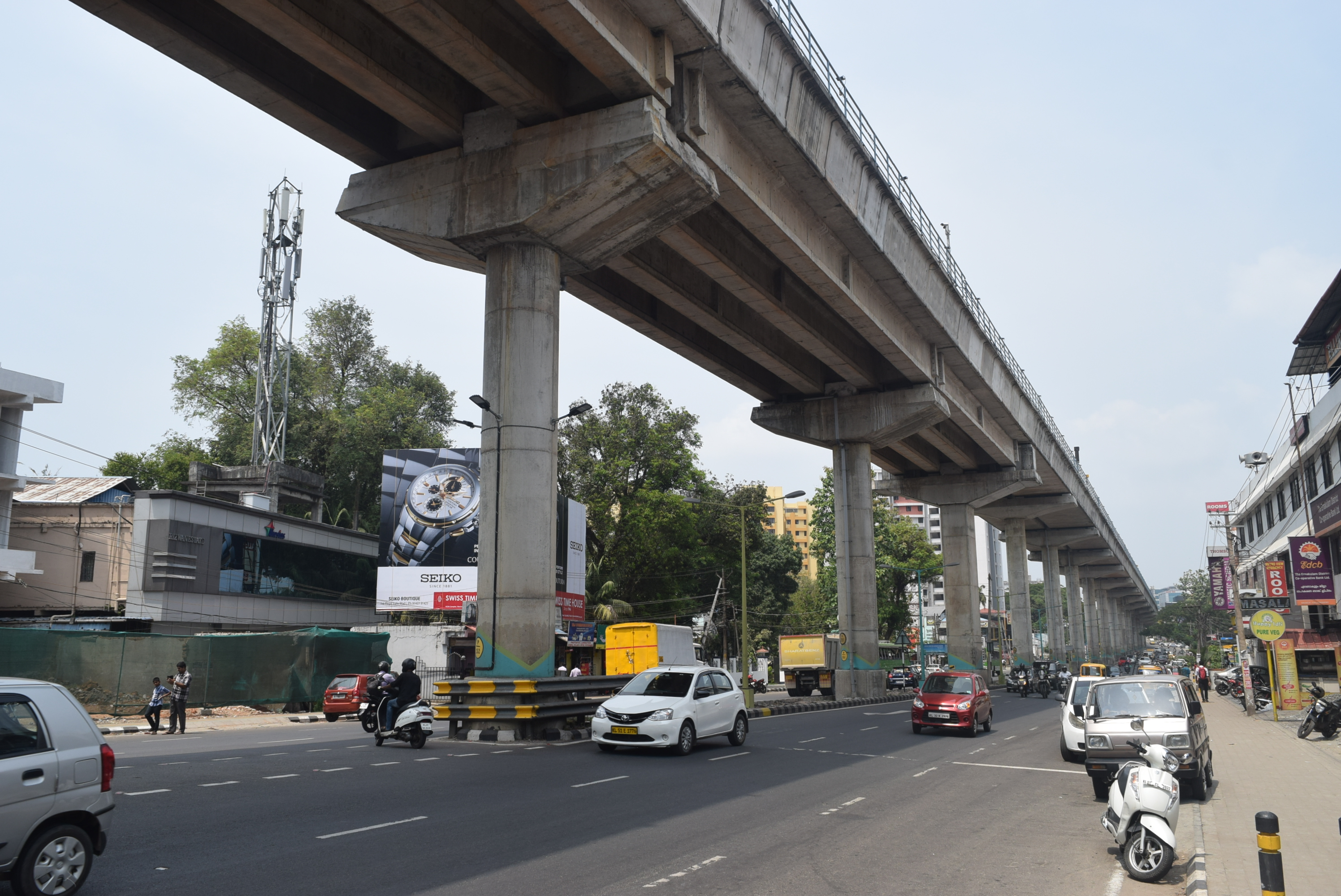
Pathadippalam Junction Edappally Kochi Kerala India

Pathadippalam is a region in the city of Kochi in Kerala, India. Kinder Multispeciality Hospital, Kinder Women's and Children's Hospital and the Kerala Museum are located in the area. Pathadipalam metro station is situated here.
