= CSI Immanuel Church, Ernakulam =

CSI Immanuel Cathedral, Cochin Diocese
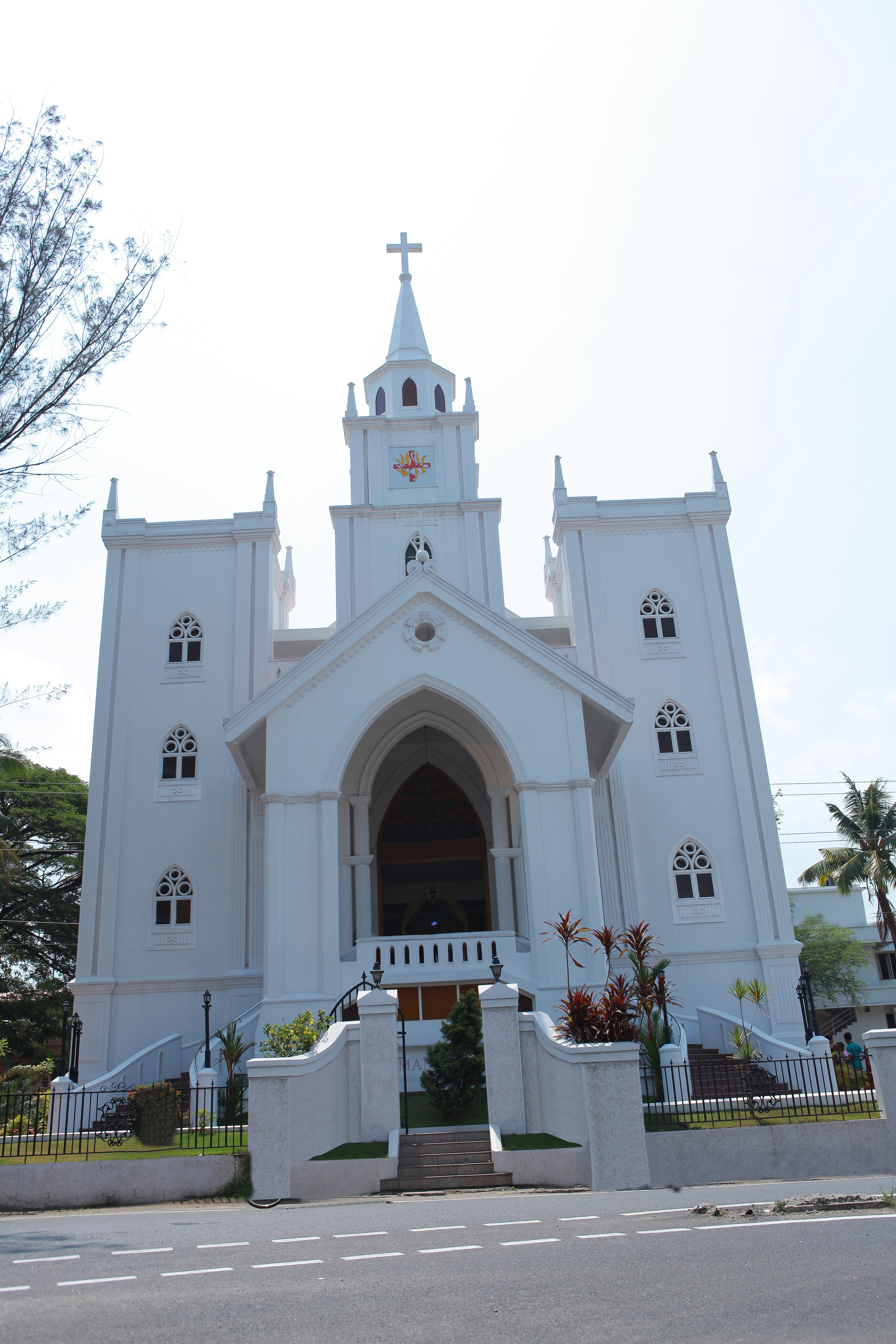
- CSI Immanuel Cathedral
- Interactive map of CSI Immanuel Cathedral, Cochin Diocese
- Country: India
- State: Kerala
- District: Ernakulam

Languages
  - Official: Malayalam, English, Tamil
- Time zone: UTC+5:30 (IST)
- City: Kochi

The CSI Immanuel Cathedral, Ernakulam is under the Diocese of Cochin of the Church of South India (CSI).

In 2017, the church was raised to the status of Cathedral with Bishop Thomas K Oommen leading the congregation.

== See also ==
- Christianity in India
- Christianity in Tamil Nadu
