= Edayil Madhom =

Indian madhom in Thrissur, India

Edayil Madhom is one of the four ancient South Indian madhoms that propagate Adwaita or Non dualism. It is located at Thrissur City in Kerala.
