= Indira Gandhi Co-operative Hospital =

Geography
- Location: Kochi, Kerala, India
- Coordinates: 10.053°N 76.356°E

Links
- Lists: Hospitals in India

Indira Gandhi Co-operative Hospital (IGCH), formerly known as the Cochin Co-operative Hospital, is a hospital operating in the co-operative sector in Kochi, Kerala, India.

== See also ==
- Government Medical College, Ernakulam
