= Aanayoottu =

Indian festival

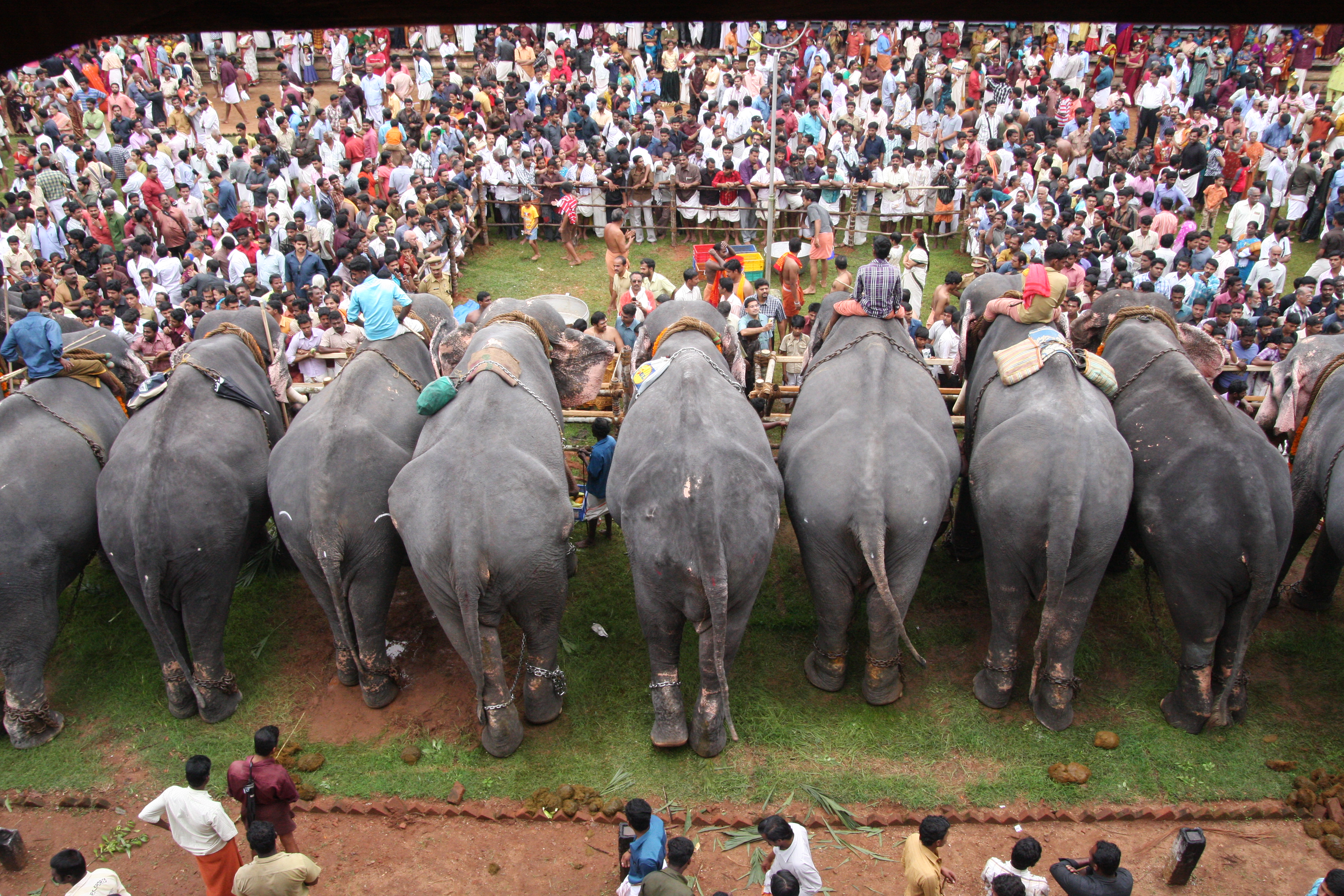
- Aanayoottu in 2010 in Thrissur city
- Genre: Temple festival
- Dates: First day of the month of Karkkidakam (Malayalam calendar)
- Locations: Thrissur City, Kerala, India
- Patron: Lord Ganesha

The Aanayoottu (feeding of elephants) is a festival held in the precincts of the Vadakkunnathan temple in City of Thrissur, in Kerala. The festival falls on the first day of the month of Karkkidakam (timed against the Malayalam calendar), which coincides with the month of July. It involves a number of unadorned elephants being positioned amid a multitude of people for being worshipped and fed. Crowds throng the temple to feed the elephants.

Every year of Aanayoottu, gaja pooja, is conducted. It is believed that offering poojas and delicious feed to the elephants is a way to satisfy Lord Ganesha—the god of wealth and of the fulfillment of wishes. The Vadakkunnathan temple, which is considered to be one of the oldest Shiva temples in southern India, has hosted the Aanayottoo event for the past few years.

== Procedure ==
the number of elephants was reduced following directives given by the district administration regarding parading of elephants for temple festivals. Fifty elephants had participated in the festival held in 2003.

— Aanayoottu held at Ponnethkavu temple, The Hindu newspaper.

The special feed of the elephants includes sugar-cane leaves, coconut, jaggery and the sweet mix of Ganapthi pooja prasadam. The feeding session begins with an offering by the chief priest of the temple—usually to an elephant calf. The festival presently involves sixteen elephants; the number was previously higher (around fifty), but was reduced following under direction of the district administration. During the festival, the elephants are fed on rice, jaggery, ghee, pineapples, and other local produce.

== Significance ==
The elephants are hailed as sacred animals (a fact which explains the presence of elephants in the South Indian temples). Elephants are an integral part of Kerala culture, and elephants are integral to all festivals, including the Aanayoottu. Many of the famous south Indian temples have a number of their own elephants; feeding these elephants are considered as auspicious. Looking in to these devotes feeling the temple authorities started these rejuvenation therapy as a public event named as ‘The Aanayoottoo Festival’.
