= Kalamassery =

- Municipality In Kochi
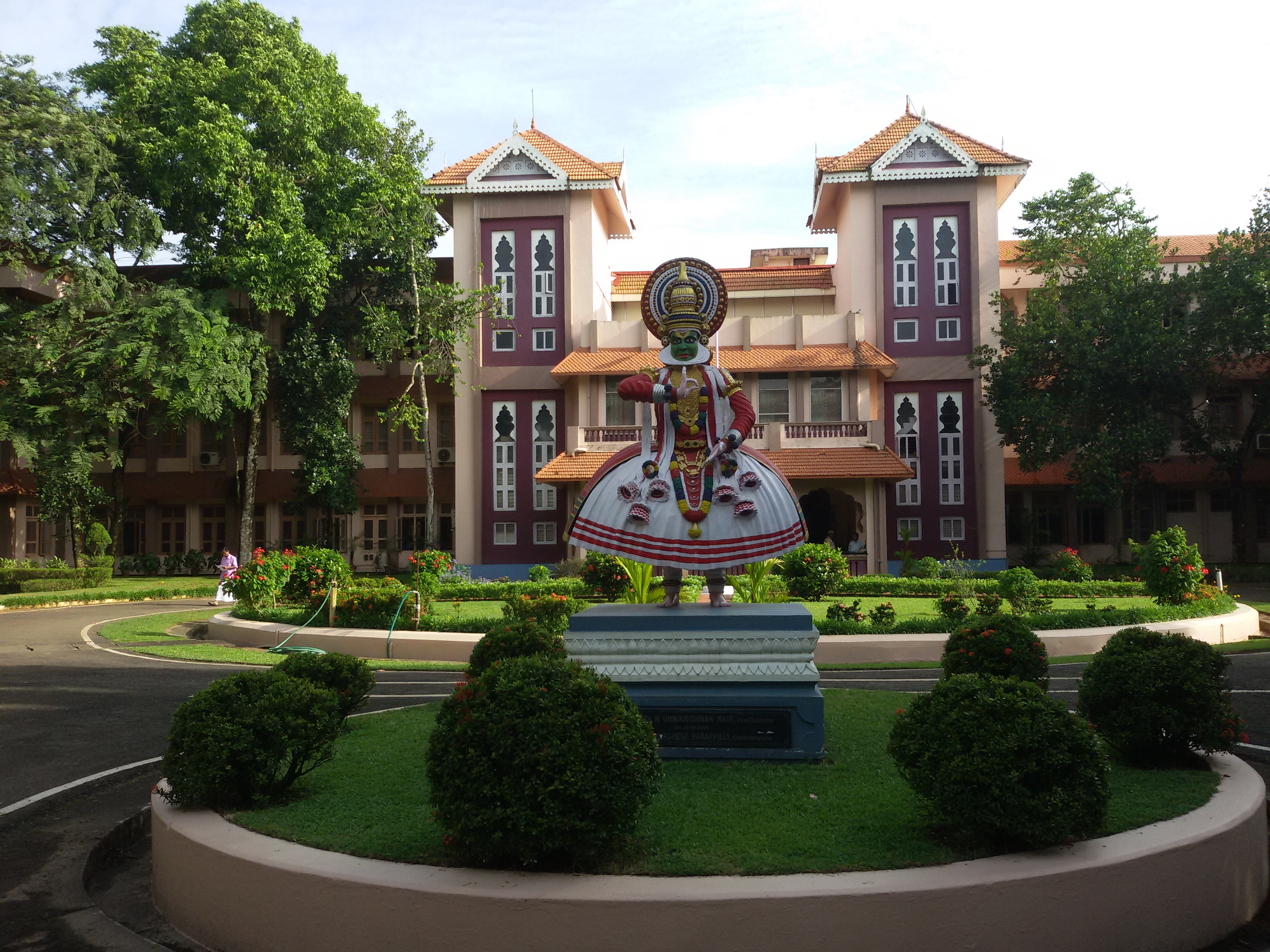
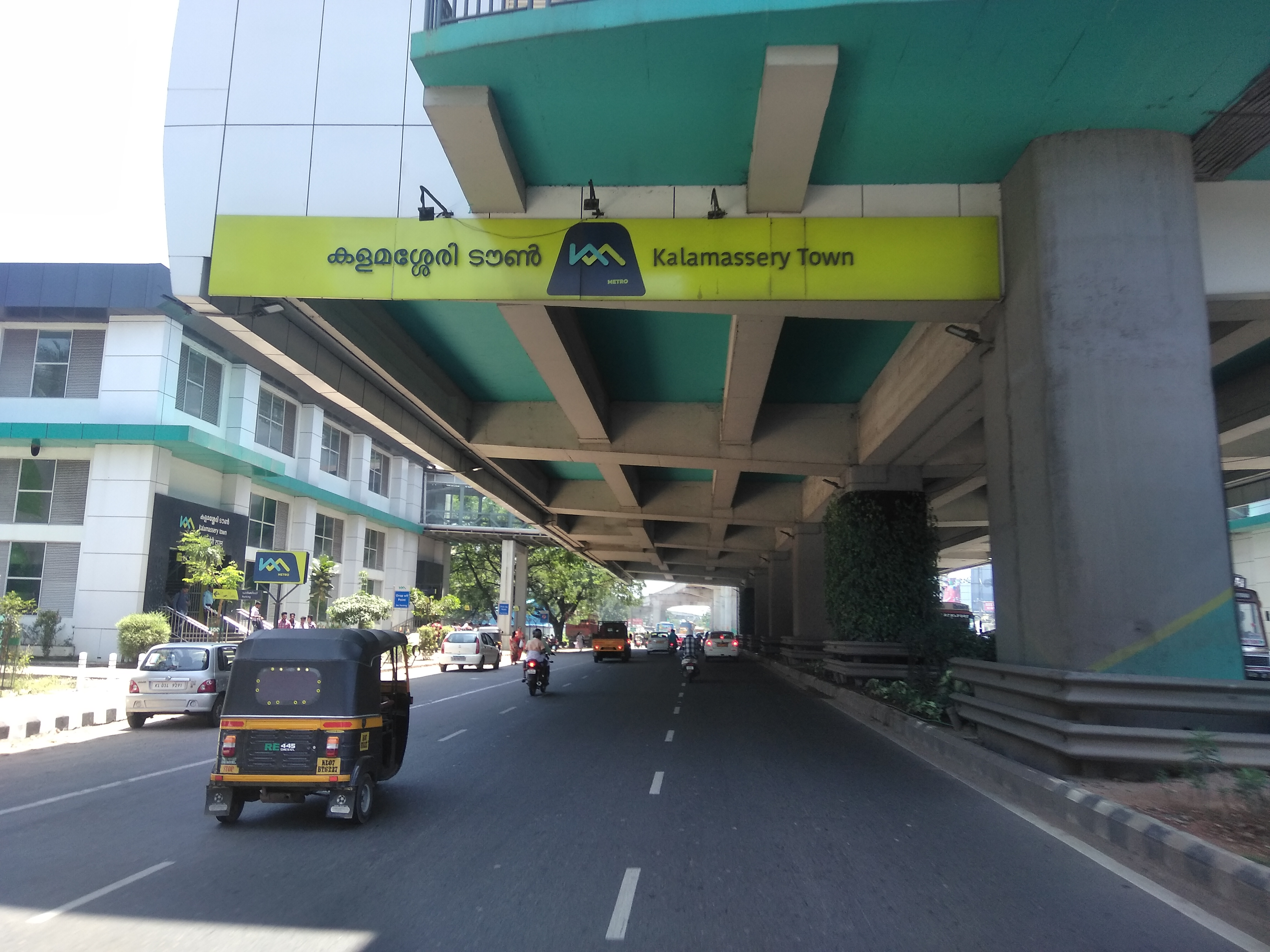
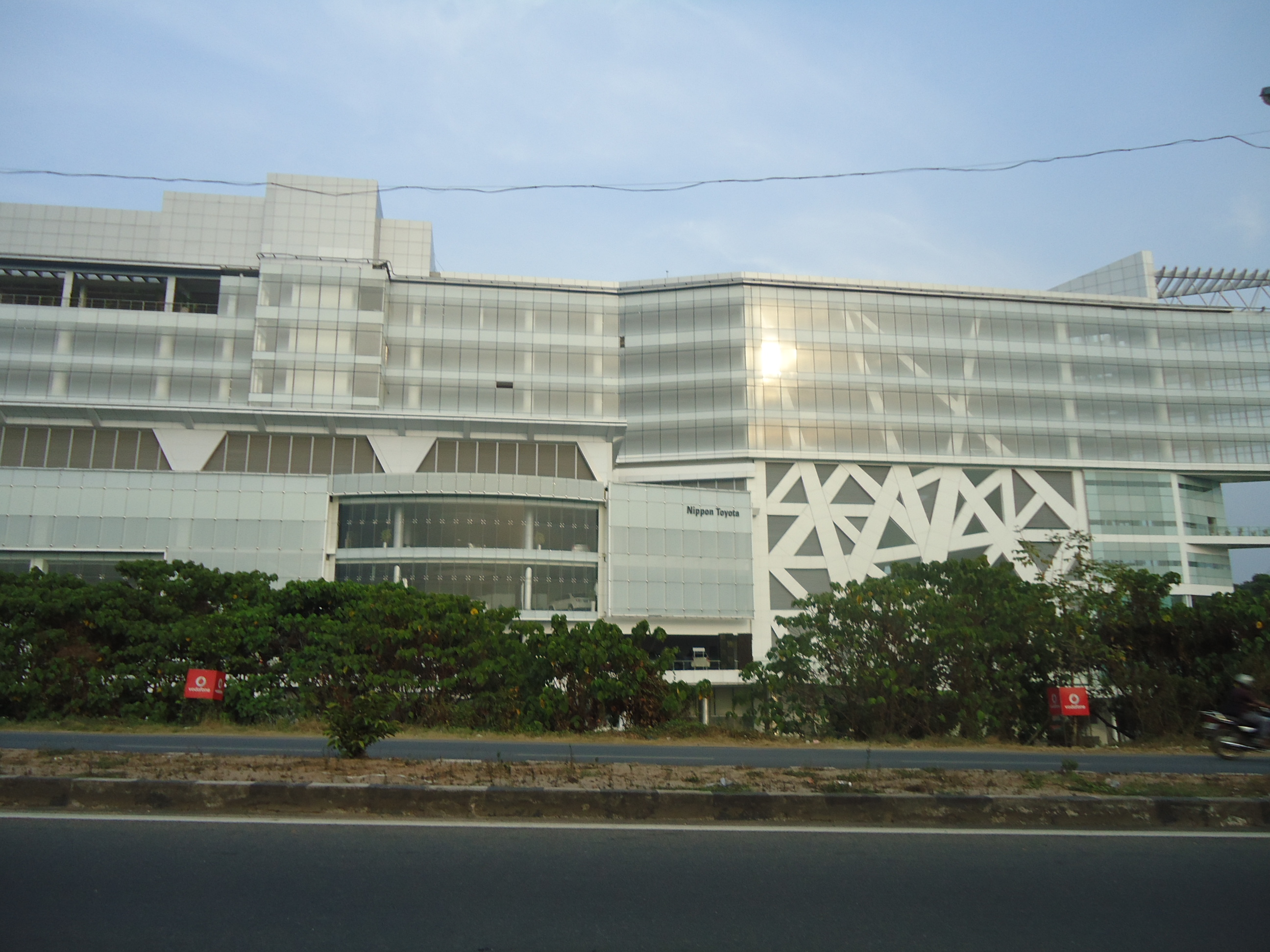
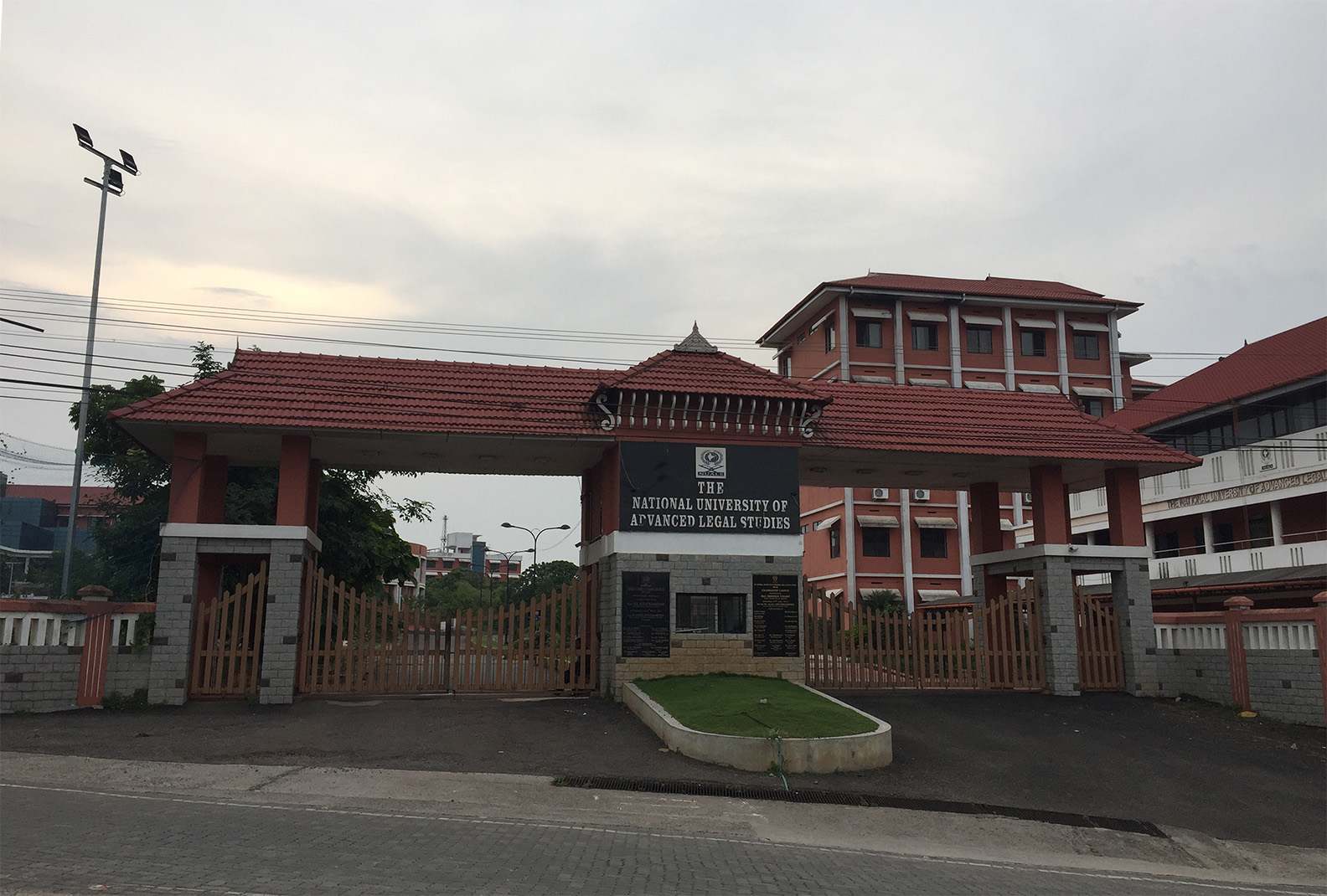
- Clockwise from top: Administrative office of CUSAT, Toyota office, Kalamassery metro station, National University of Advanced Legal Studies

- Location in Kerala, India Kalamassery (India)
- Coordinates: 10.0519694°N 76.3157719°E
- Country: India
- City UA: Kochi
- State: Kerala
- District: Ernakulam

Government
  - Type: Municipal Council
  - Body: Kalamassery Municipality
  - Chairperson: Jamal Manakkadan (INC)
  - Deputy chairperson: TBD

Area
  - Total: 27 km^{2} (10 sq mi)

Population (2011)
  - Total: 70,776
  - Density: 2,600/km^{2} (6,800/sq mi)

Languages
  - Official: Malayalam and English
- Time zone: UTC+5:30 (IST)
- PIN: 683 503,683 104
- Vehicle registration: KL-07
- Website: kalamasserymunicipality.lsgkerala.gov.in/en

Kalamassery ([kɐɭɐmɐʃːeːɾi]) is a major industrial region in the city of Kochi in the state of Kerala, India. It is located around 9 km (5.6 mi) northeast of the city centre.

Kalamassery is a major hub for industrial and IT activities in Kochi. In local administration it is a municipality. The Kalamassery Industrial Estate set up by the Government of Kerala is home to many major companies. Kalamassery is also home to educational institutions such as the National University of Advanced Legal Studies, Ernakulam Medical College, and the Cochin University of Science and Technology. The area's location along the NH 66 and proximity to the IT centres in Kakkanad has enabled it to see a large spurt in economic development since the 1980s.

== Demographics ==
Historical population
Year	Pop.	±%
1991	54,342	—
2001	63,176	+16.3%
2011	71,038	+12.4%

As of 2001 India census, Kalamassery had a population of 63,176. Sex ratio is 956 females per 1000 males. Kalamassery has an average literacy rate of 84%, which is significantly higher than the national average of 59.5%. Male literacy is 87%, and female literacy is 82%. In Kalamassery, 10% of the population is under 6 years of age. Hinduism is the most professed religion at 41%, followed by Islam (34%).

Raw data

== Economy ==
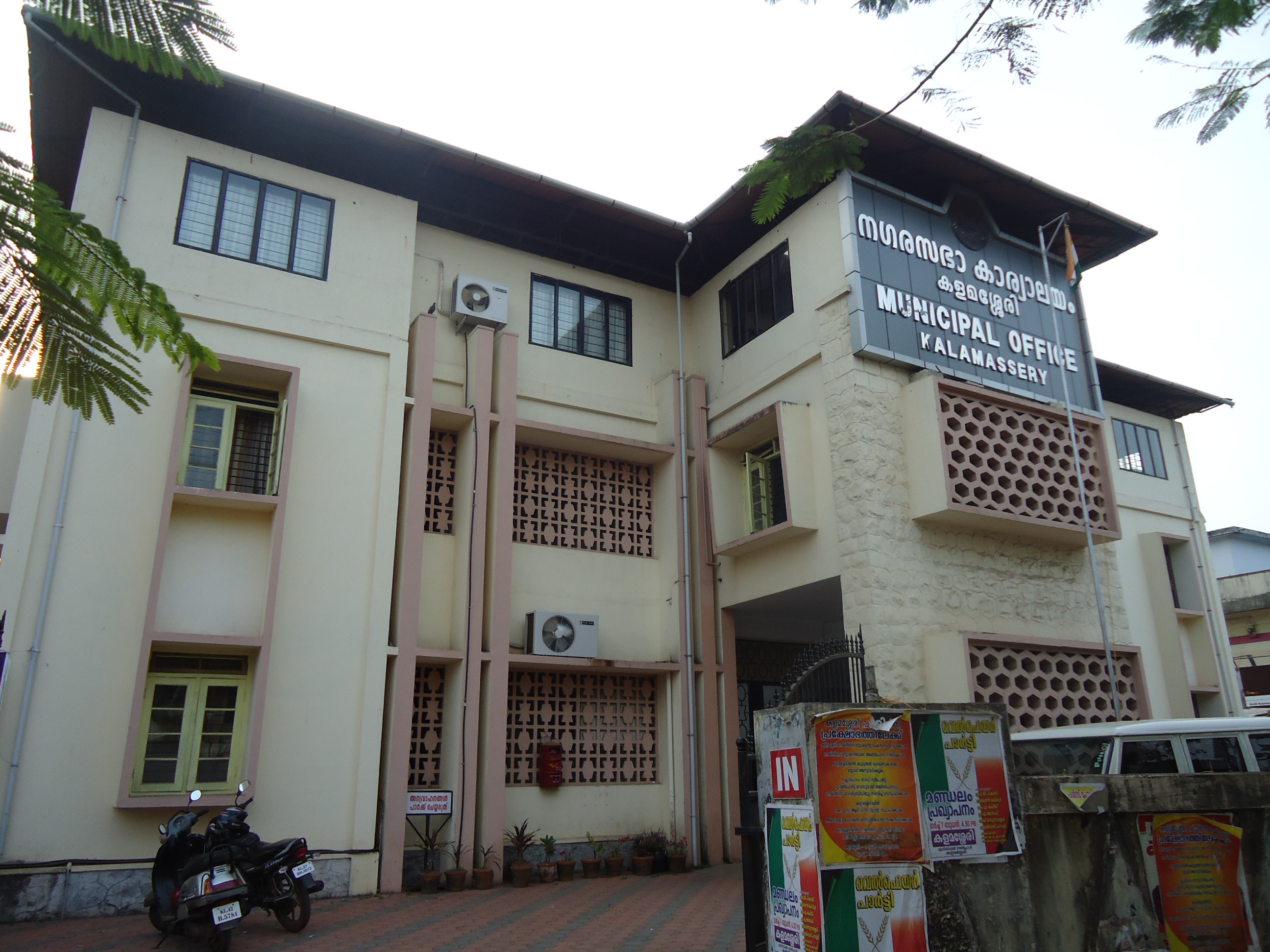
Kalamassery Municipal office

FACT, India's 1st large scale unit was set up in 1943 for production of fertiliser. In 1947, FACT Udyogamandal started production of ammonium sulphate with an installed capacity of 10,000 MT nitrogen. FACT became a Kerala State Public Sector Enterprise on 15 August 1960 and on 21 November 1962; the Government of India became a major Shareholder. FACT engineering works was established on 13 April 1966. Aluminium oxide is also produced in Kalamassery. Apollo Tyres acquired the Premier Tyres plant in Kalamassery. The Hindustan Machine Tools also known as HMT is also located at the hearts of Kalamassery . Merchem and Carborundum Universal Electro-minerals division has its offices at South Kalamassery. Many Vehicle aftersales - service centres like Toyota, Renault, Nissan, Volkswagen, Fiat etc., are located at Kalamassery. The Kerala State Electricity Board or KSEB sub-division is at Kalamassery . The Kochi Metro Casting Yard and Metro Village is located at HMT Colony in Kalamassery . The Science City, Startup Village, KINFRA are at Kalamassery. The Water from Periyar is supplied to Kochi City by Various pipes placed which are managed by the PWD and the Kerala Water Authority. India's first telecom incubation center located in kalamassery.

There are also many small-scale industries in Kalamassery, like St. Antony Industries, Micro Tools, Ambadan Industries, Vellappally Manufacturing Industry, Pottekattu Rubbers Pvt. Ltd., Logiwiz, Bajaj, etc. A part of South Kalamassery serves as an industrial area that hosts small-scale industries, including perfume-making and plastic recycling. These industries employ a large number of people. There are also Kudumbashree associations, employing many women. The main headquarters of Vodafone India is at South Kalamassery. The largest shopping mall in India- LuLu International Shopping Mall, which opened in 2013, is located at Edapally toll, within the Kalamasserry Municipality.

Kalamassery is home to 3 Kochi Metro stations:

- The Kalamassery Town metro station is located at the Premier Junction in Kalamassery, in front of the Apollo Tyres factory.
- The CUSAT metro station, which is located close to Cochin University of Science and Technology in South Kalamassery.
- The Pathadipalam metro station, located near MILMA, ERCMPU LTD in Koonamthai.

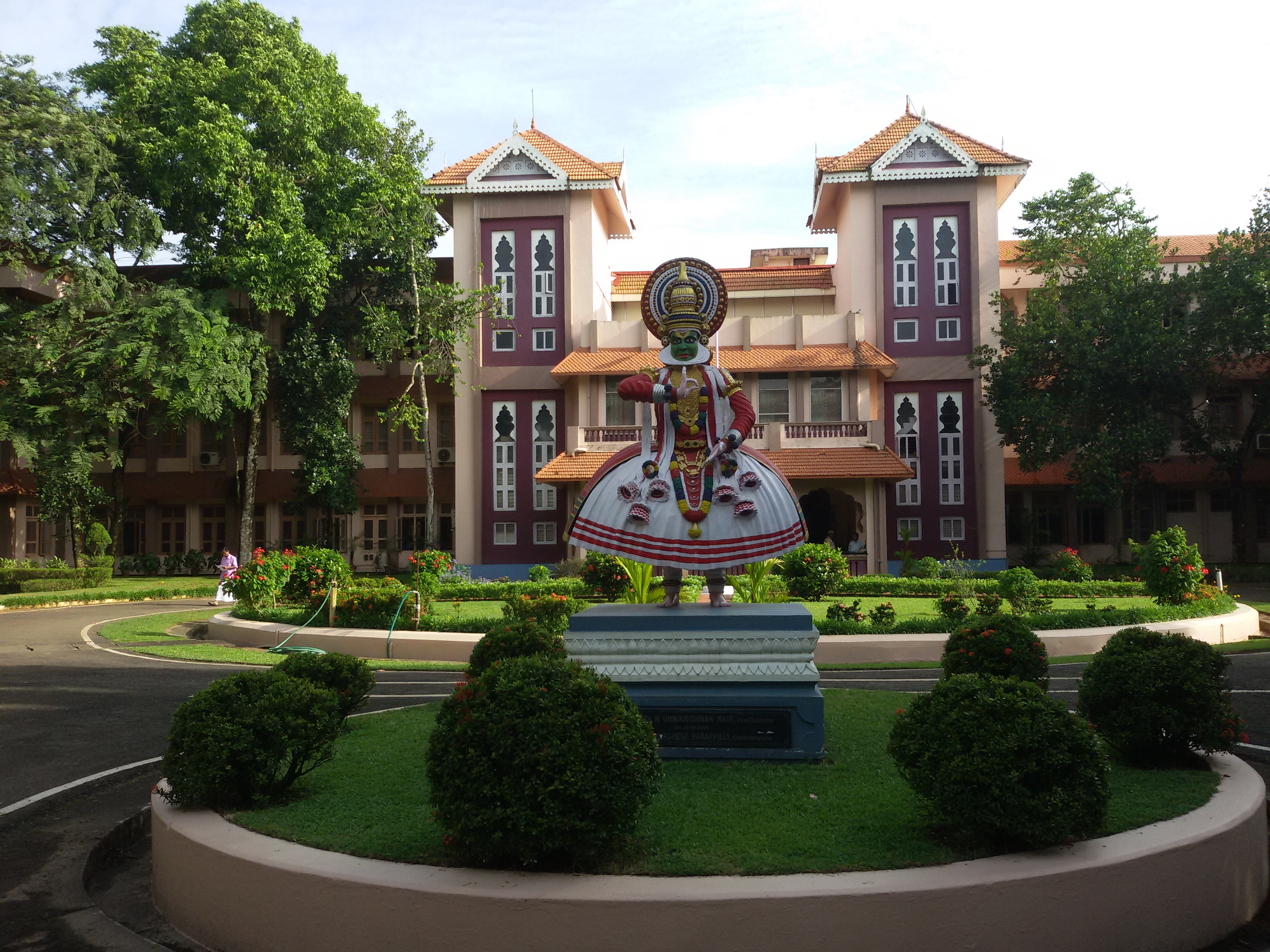
* Administrative Block, Cusat

== Etymology ==
The name Kalamassery is derived from Kalabhasery. In Malayalam, a word can have multiple meanings: in common usage "kalabham" means yellow sandalwood paste, and in literary Malayalam, it can mean Elephant. Kalabhasery, a location near HMT, was where elephants from Thrikkakara Temple was taken for rest after celebrations at the temple. During the course of time Kalabhasery became Kalamassery. Historically, the prominent area was called Njalakam, place with a prominent Juma Masjid, but during the time of creation of Kalamassery Panchayat which includes Njalakam, it was decided to name the area Kalamassery instead of Njalakam due to the growth of Kalamassery. A primary driver of growth was the nearby Fertilisers and Chemicals Travancore Limited (FACT) in Udyogamandal. Employees of FACT would regularly visit Kalamassery for shopping and other purposes. Many settled down in Kalamassery after retirement in places like Santhinagar and Santhinagar Annexe. This growth was brought about by new industries like HMT in that area. Later, the rapid growth of Kalamassery led to it being promoted to a Municipality.

== Geography ==
The soils consists mainly of recent sediments (Alluvium, Teri's, Brown sand etc.). Red colored sticky soil is also found in these areas. The climate is generally tropical, heavy rains from the southwest and northeast monsoon are common from June through September. The average annual rainfall is about 350 cm.

== Civic administration ==
Kalamassery is a major suburb of the city of Kochi. It is administered by the Kalamassery Municipality, established on 1990. The municipality is divided into 46 wards, each represented by an elected councillor, who together form the municipal council. The council is headed by a Chairperson and a Deputy Chairperson, elected from among its members.

=== 2025 Kalamassery Municipal Elections ===
In the 2025 municipal elections, the UDF won 28 seats, followed by the LDF with 11, NDA with 1, and Independents with 6 seats.

== Education ==
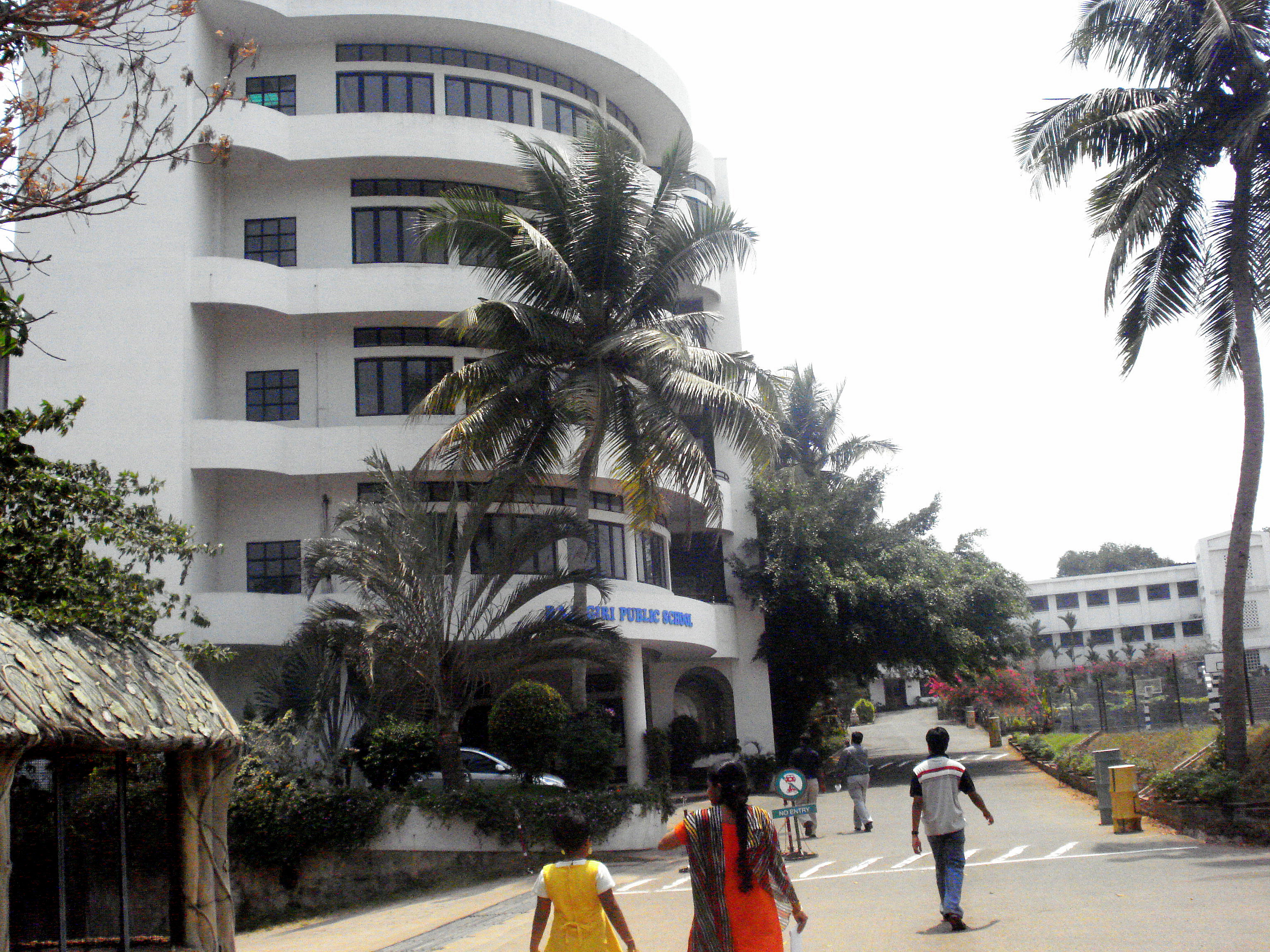
Rajagiri Public School

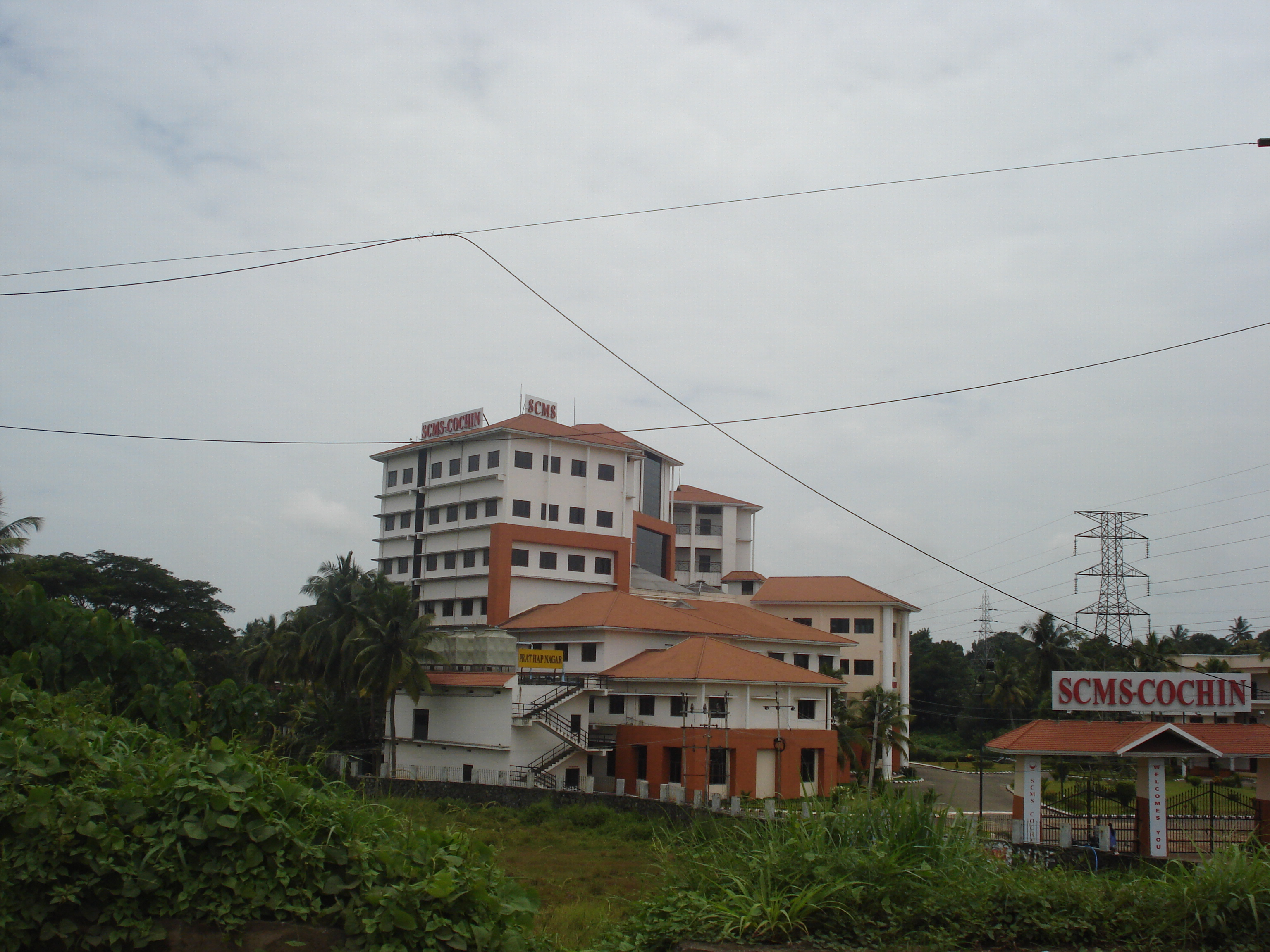
SCMS School of Management

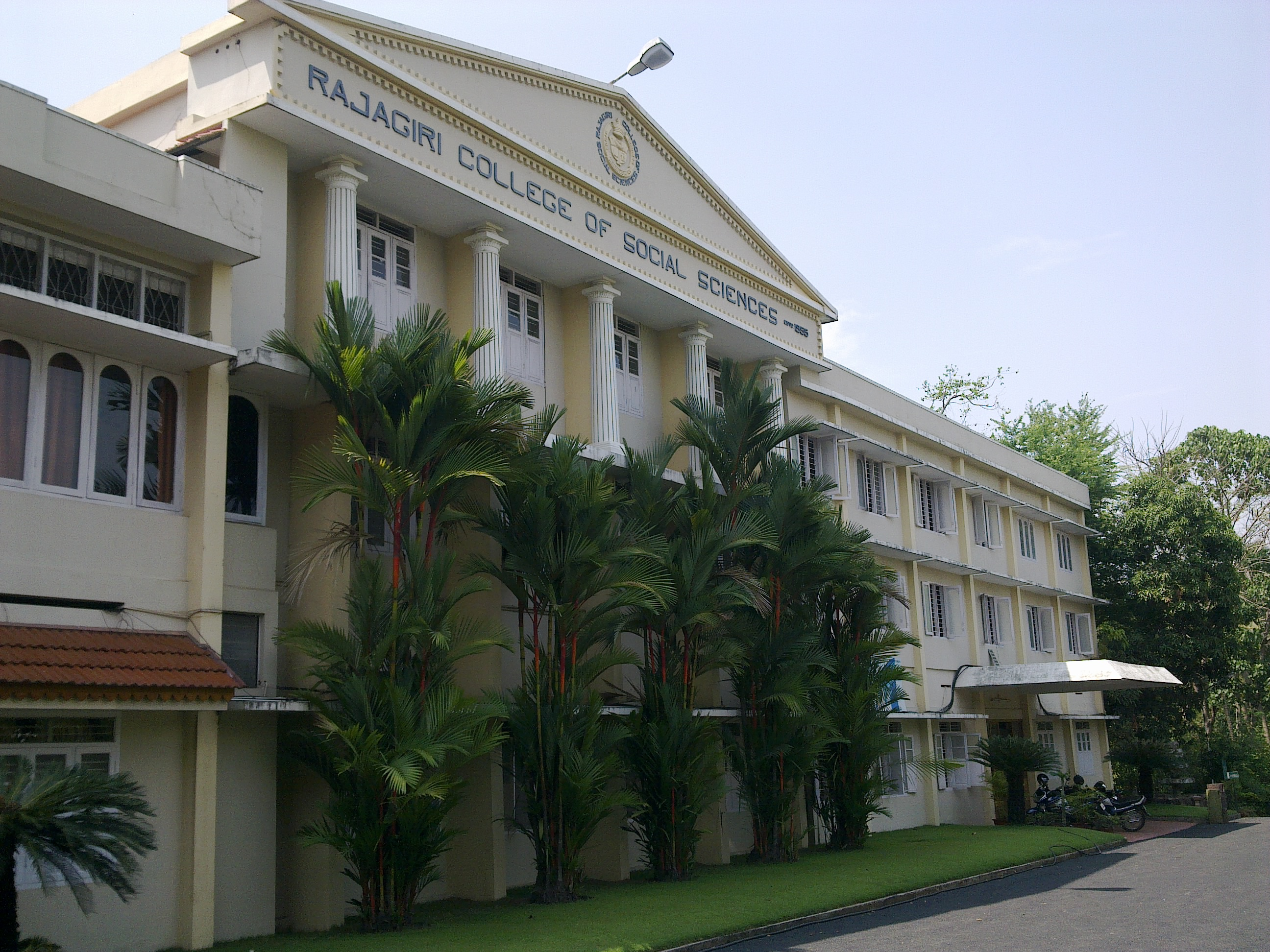
Rajagiri College of Social Science

- Government Medical College Ernakulam
- Model Engineering College
- Rajagiri College of Social Sciences
- St. Paul's College, Kalamassery
- Xavier Institute of Management and Entrepreneurship
- Government Polytechnic College
- Little Flower Engineering Institute
- Government I.T.I Kalamassery
- Food Craft Institute
- LBS Centre for Science & Technology
- Cochin University of Science and Technology
- National University of Advanced Legal Studies

== Places of interest ==
=== Museum of Kerala History ===
Museum of Kerala History is situated near Pathadippalam Metro Station. It has representations of 87 figures who shaped the history and culture of Kerala in the last two thousand years. The museum has a collection of 150 dolls, all hand-made and detailed, representing the cultural and ethnic diversity of India. The dolls represent young men and women from Gujarat to Nagaland and from Kashmir to Kanyakumari. The gallery depicts mainly specimens of Indian contemporary art (painting and sculpture) over a period of the last two hundred years. The gallery also displays a mural painting based on the classical Sanskrit drama Shakuntalam executed in the traditional Kerala. The mural, at 25 feet long and 5 feet wide, is one of the largest in Kerala.

==== Kochi Science City ====
The Science Park is a project of the Kerala government and is located near the Government Medical College, Kalamassery. It houses various attractions for children including an amphitheatre and a planetarium.

== Places of worship ==
- St. John of God Roman Catholic Church, Angel Mary Nagar, Kalamassery.
- Thrikkakkara Vamana Moorthy Temple
- SNDP Temple, Kangarappady
- Peringazha Sree Durga Bhagavati Temple
- Palakkamughal Juma Masjid
- Korakkambilly Sri Durgabhavathi
- St. Pius Xth Church, Kalamassery
- Ponnakudam Bhagavathy Temple
- Puthuserymala Sri Bhadrakali Temple
- Vidakkuzha Sree Krishna Swami Temple
- Kavungalkavu Durga Temple
- Ilfathul Islam Juma Masjid, Pallilamkara
- Jnanasidhi Ayyappa Temple
- Kudilil Sree Kurumba Bhagavathi Temple
- Puthalath Devi Temple
- Pratheeksha Nagar Masjid
- St. George Orthodox Church, Seaport Airport Road, Kalamassery
- Njalakam Juma Masjid, South Kalamassery
- Hayathul Islam Masjid, Changampuzha Nagar
- Kalamassery Mahaganapathy Temple
- St. Thomas Marthoma Church Kalamassery
- All Saints CSI Church
- St Marys Jacobite Church
- St Jude Knayana Church
- Kavungal Kaavu Shri Durga Bhagavathi Temple Pallilamkara
- Ibrahim Masjid, Mannopilly
- Hidayathul Islam Masjid, Changampuzha Nagar
- St. Joseph's Church Kalamassery (Social Church)

== See also ==
- Kangarappady
- Koonamthai
- Thrikkakara
