= Kochi =

Metropolis in Kerala, India

Kochi Kocci (Malayalam) Cochin
- Metropolis
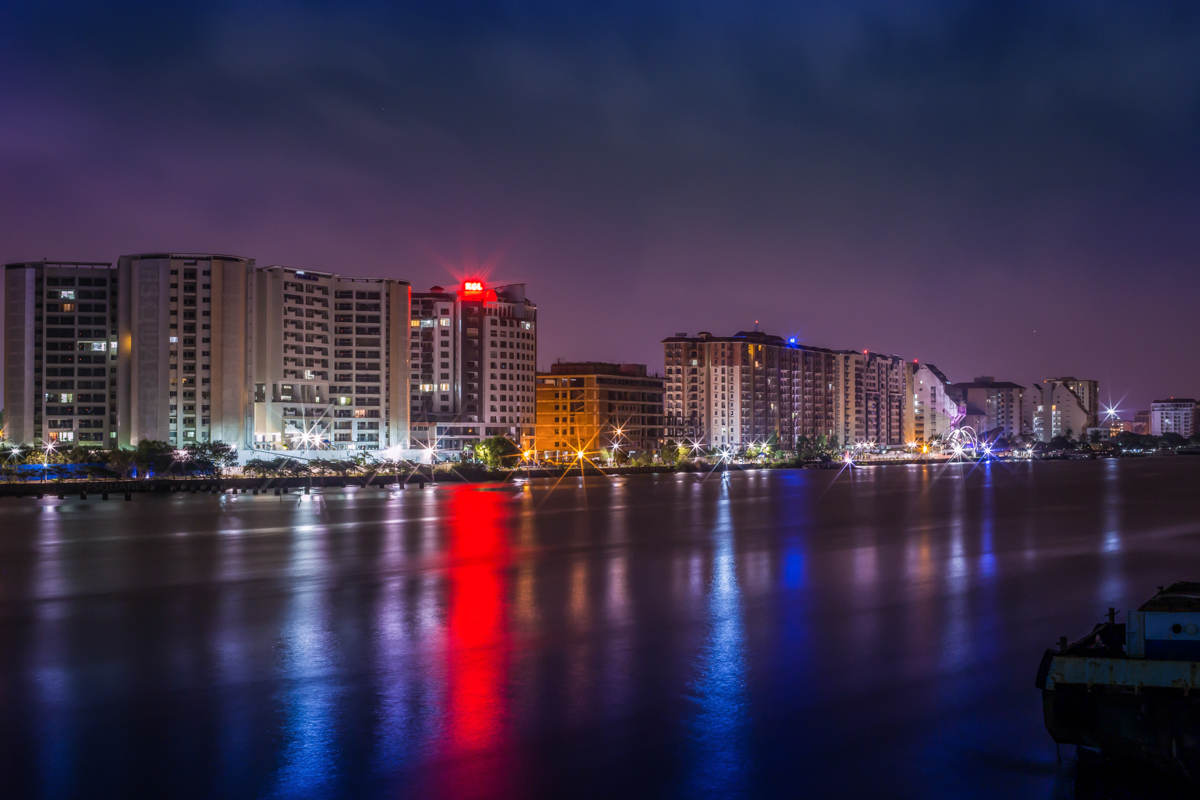
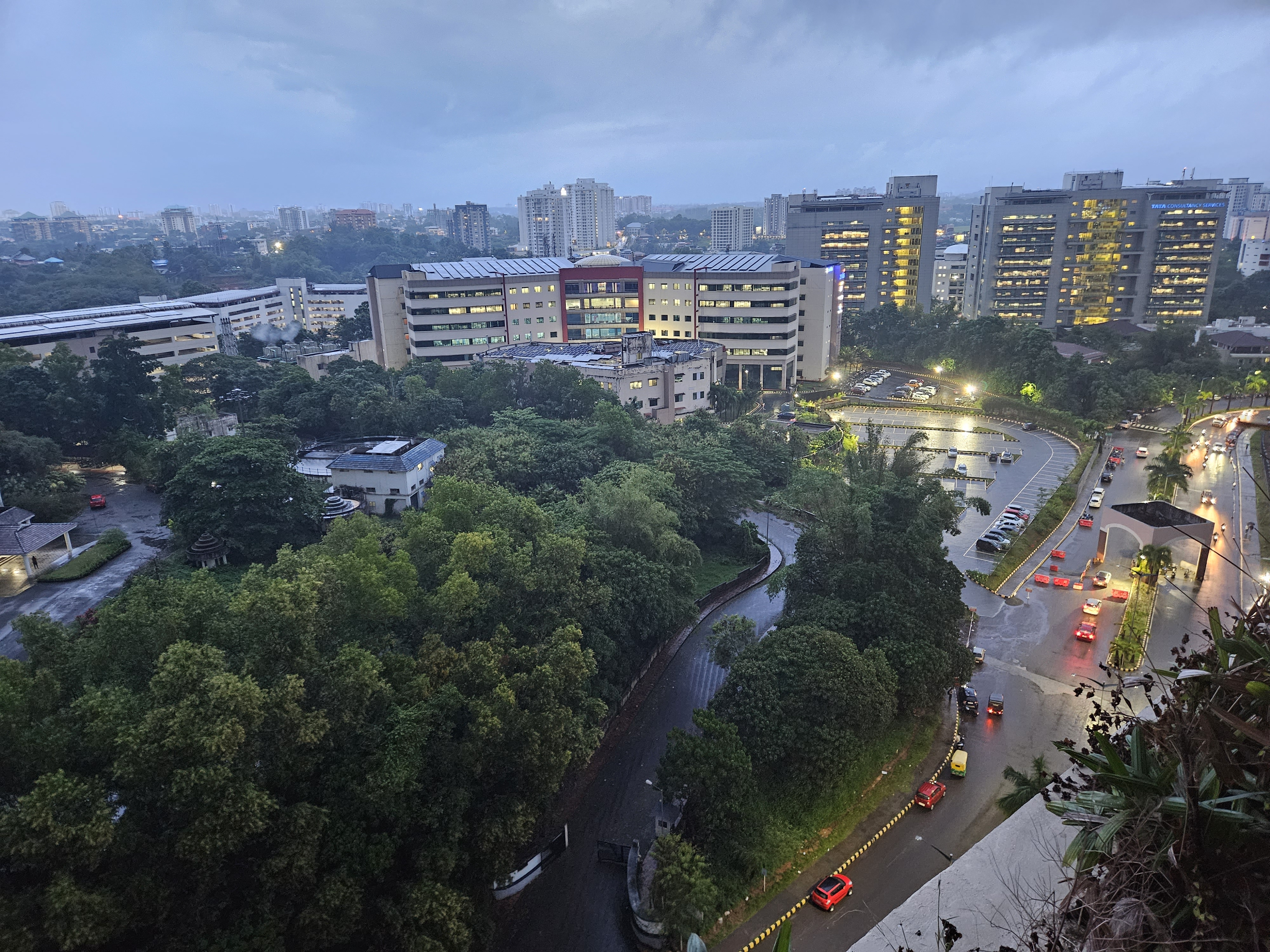
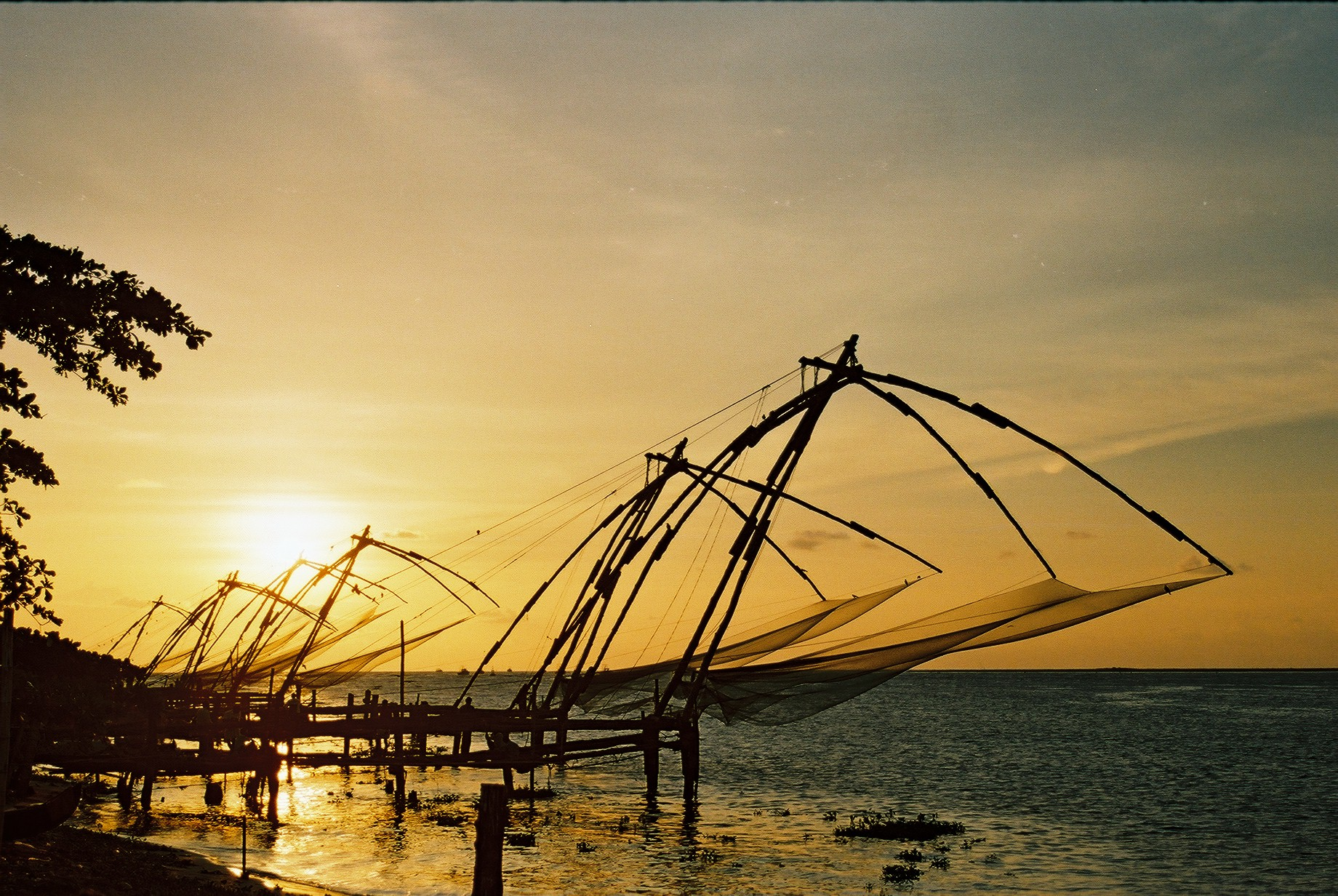
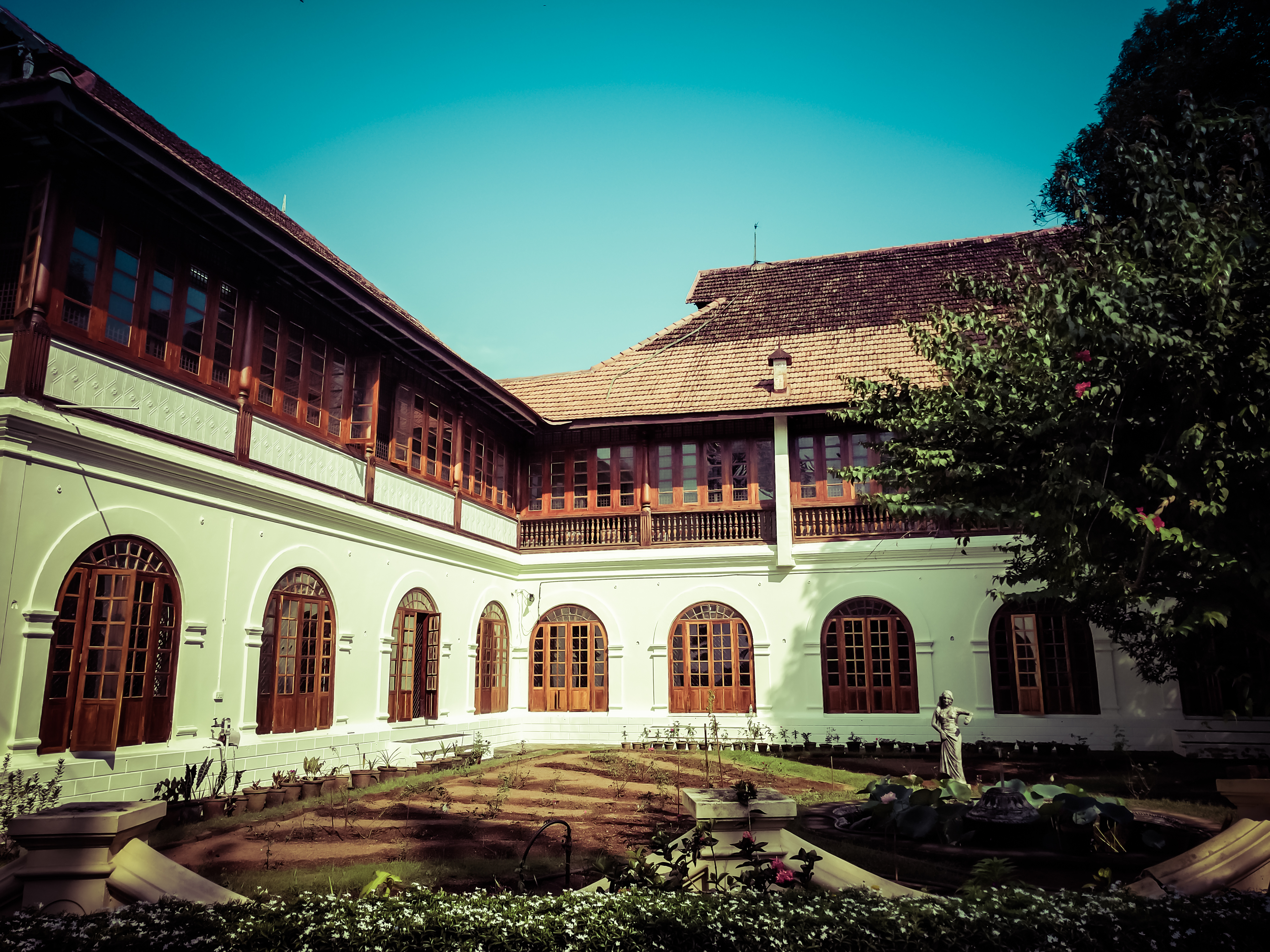
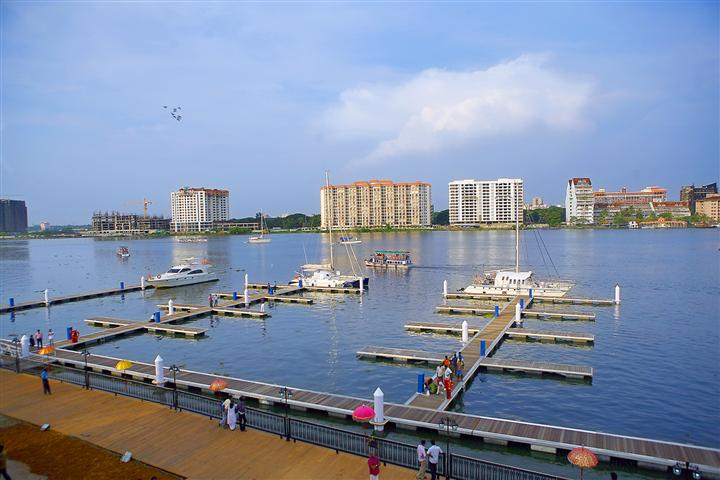
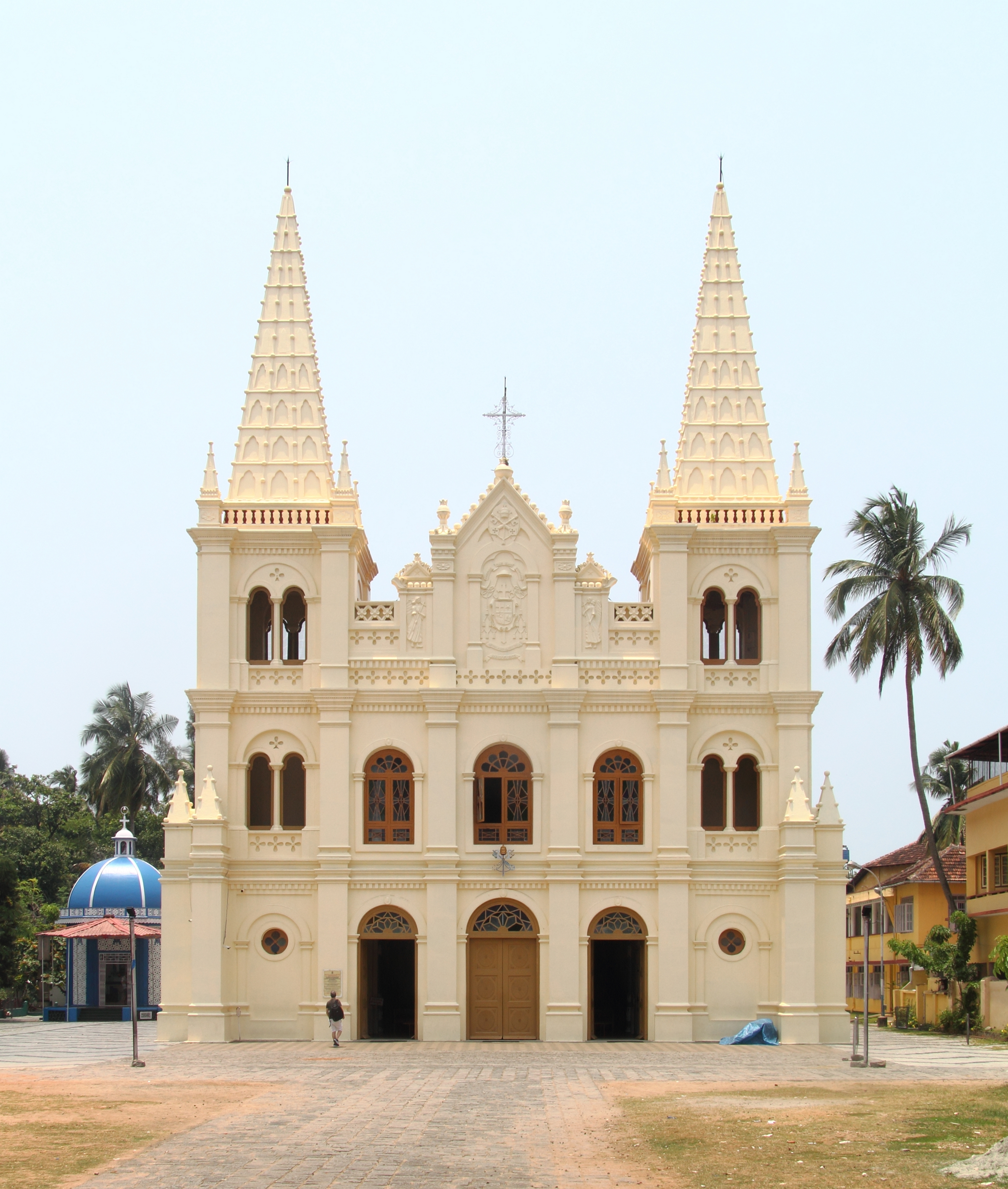
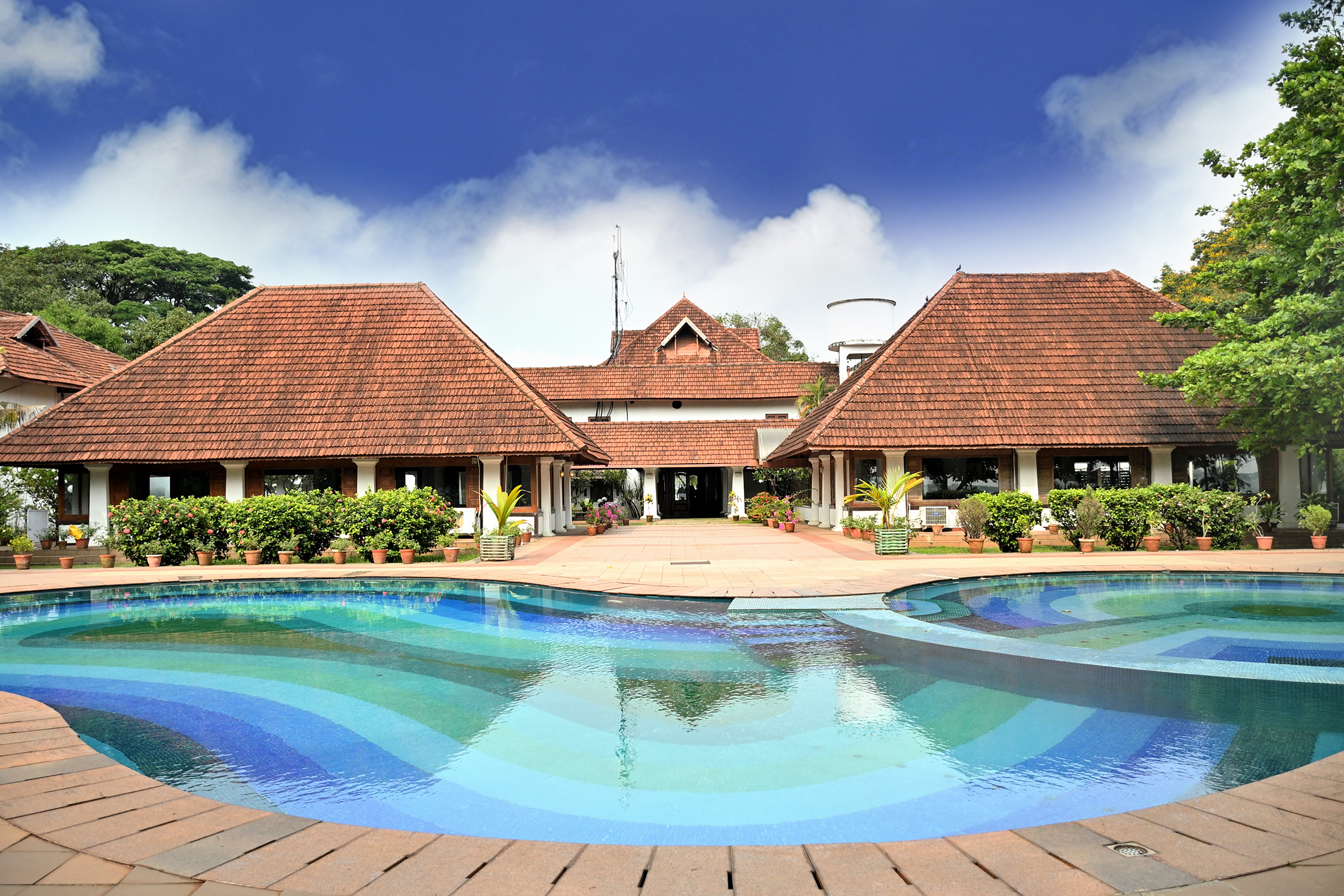
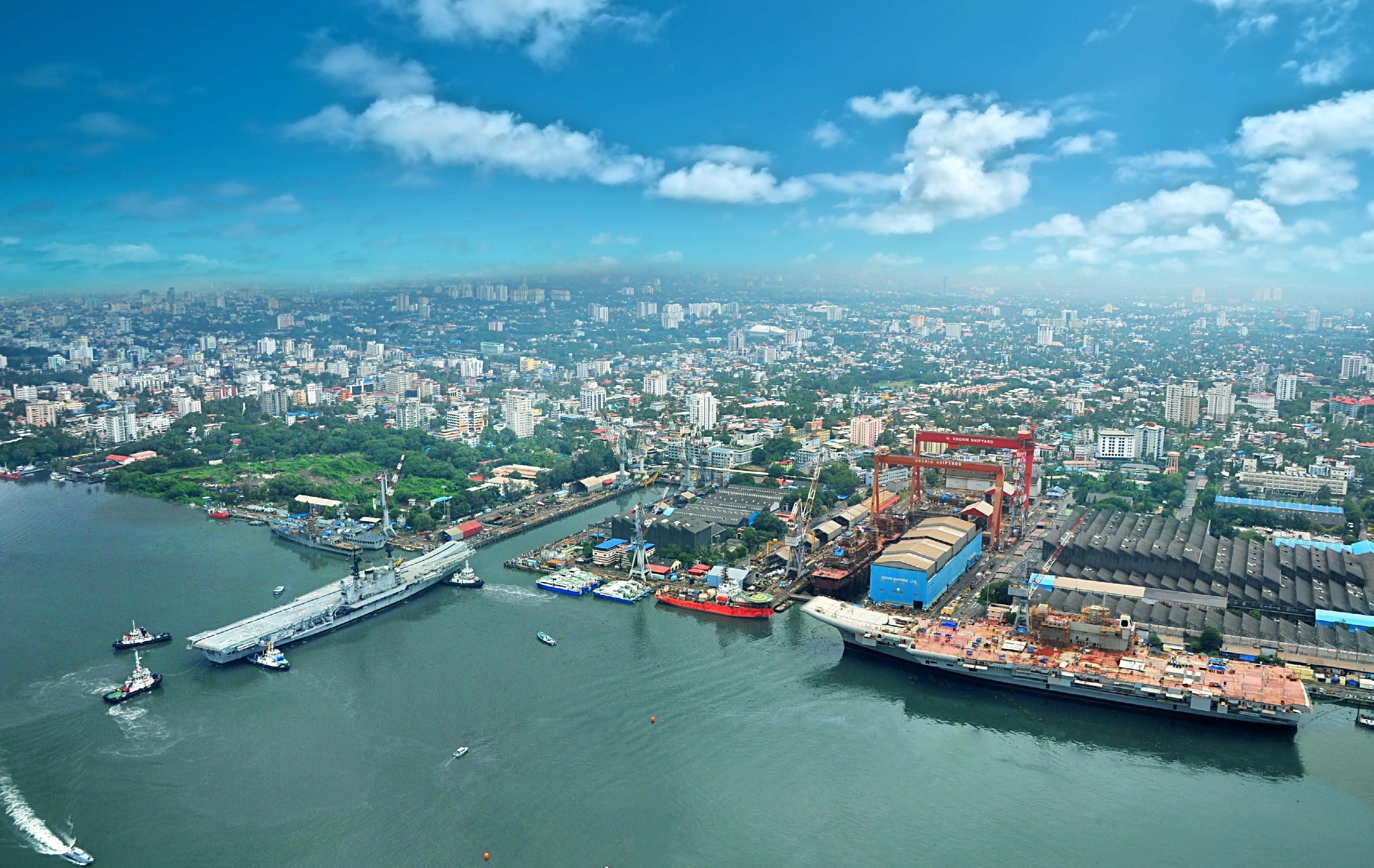
- Skyline of Marine Drive Infopark Phase I Fort Kochi Beach Hill Palace Museum Kochi International Marina Santa Cruz Basilica Bolgatty Palace INS Vikrant under construction at Cochin Shipyard
- Nickname: Queen of the Arabian Sea
- Interactive map of Kochi
- Coordinates: 9°55′52.3″N 76°16′02.3″E
- Country: India
- State: Kerala
- District: Ernakulam
- Formed: 1 April 1958

Government
  - Type: Municipal Corporation
  - Body: Kochi Municipal Corporation
  - Mayor: V. K. Minimol (INC)
  - Deputy mayor: Deepak Joy (INC)

Area
  - Metropolis: 94.88 km^{2} (36.63 sq mi)
  - Metro: 440 km^{2} (170 sq mi)
- Elevation: 26.02 m (85.4 ft)

Population (2011)
  - Metropolis: 677,381
  - Density: 7,139/km^{2} (18,490/sq mi)
  - Metro: 2,119,724
  - Metro density: 4,800/km^{2} (12,000/sq mi)
- Demonym(s): English: Kochinite, Cochini, Malayalam: Kochikaran (M), Kochikari (F)
- Time zone: UTC+5:30 (IST)
- PIN (code)s: 682xxx, 683xxx
- Area code: +91484xxxxxxx
- Vehicle registration: KL-07 Ernakulam; KL-39 Thripunithura; KL-40 Perumbavoor; KL-41 Aluva; KL-42 North Paravur; KL-43 Mattancherry; KL-63 Angamaly
- Judicial Capital: High Court of Kerala
- Coastline: 48 kilometres (30 mi)
- Sex ratio: 1028♀/1000♂
- Literacy: 98.5%
- International airport: Cochin International Airport
- Rapid Transit: Kochi Metro
- Official language: Malayalam, English
- GDP(2020): US$15.64 (equivalent to $16.05 in 2025) billion
- Development agencies: GCDA, GIDA
- Climate: Am (Köppen)
- Precipitation: 3,228.3 millimetres (127.10 in)
- Website: cochinmunicipalcorporation.kerala.gov.in.

Kochi (/ˈkoʊtʃi/ KOH-chee, Malayalam: [kotˈt͡ʃi]), formerly known as Cochin (/ˈkoʊtʃɪn/ KOH-chin), is a major port city along the Malabar Coast of India bordering the Laccadive Sea. It is part of the district of Ernakulam in the state of Kerala and is the financial, industrial and commercial capital of the state. The city is also commonly referred to as Ernakulam, which is its central business district. As of 2011, the Kochi Municipal Corporation had a population of 677,381 over an area of 94.88 km^{2}, and the larger Kochi urban agglomeration had over 2.1 million inhabitants within an area of 440 km^{2}, making it the largest and the most populous metropolitan area in Kerala. Kochi city is also part of the Greater Cochin development region and is classified as a Tier-II city by the Government of India. The civic body that governs the city is the Kochi Municipal Corporation, which was constituted in the year 1967, and the statutory bodies that oversee its development are the Greater Cochin Development Authority (GCDA) and the Goshree Islands Development Authority (GIDA).

Nicknamed the Queen of the Arabian Sea, Kochi was an important spice trading center on the west coast of India from antiquity. The port of Muziris traded with the Romans, Persians, Arabs, and Chinese. From 1503 to 1663, the Portuguese established Fort Emmanuel, before it was taken over by the Dutch in 1663. The Dutch then ceded the area to the United Kingdom. Kochi remained under the control of the Kingdom of Cochin, which became a princely state of the British. The construction of the Cochin Port and the reclamation of Willingdon Island in 1928 transformed Kochi into a major seaport and trading hub on the Malabar Coast. Over the following decades, the city developed into a major industrial and commercial centre, with shipbuilding, petroleum refining, and information technology becoming important parts of its economy.

Kochi houses major government institutions including the High Court of Kerala. It is home to Cochin Shipyard, the largest shipbuilding and maintenance facility in India in terms of capacity. Kochi is the first city in India to implement a water metro system, the Kochi Water Metro, an integrated urban water transport network that is being constructed in phases. It is also the only city in Kerala to have a rapid transit system. The Cochin International Airport is the first in the world to operate solely on solar energy.

Kochi's rich cultural heritage has made it a popular tourist destination among both domestic and international travellers. It has been hosting India's first art biennale, the Kochi-Muziris Biennale, since 2012, which attracts international artists and tourists. The Chinese fishing nets, introduced during the 14th century by the Chinese, are a symbol of the city and a popular tourist attraction in themselves. Other landmarks include Mattanchery Palace, Marine Drive, Venduruthy Bridge, Church of Saint Francis and Mattanchery Bridge. The city ranks first in the total number of international and domestic tourist arrivals in Kerala. The city was ranked the sixth best tourist destination in India according to a survey conducted by the Nielsen Company on behalf of the Outlook Traveller magazine. In October 2019, Kochi was ranked seventh in Lonely Planet's list of top 10 cities in the world to visit in 2020. In November 2023, the British Luxury travel magazine Condé Nast Traveller rated Kochi as one of the best places to go in Asia in 2024.

== Etymology ==
Ancient travellers and tradesmen referred to Kochi, variously alluding to it as Cocym, Cochym, Cochin, and Kochi. The Cochin Jewish community called Cochin Kogin (Hebrew: קוגין), which is seen in the seal of the synagogue owned by the community. The Arab merchants called this place Kashi, which is seen in the books such as Tuhfat Ul Mujahideen. The origin of the name Kochi is thought to be the Malayalam word kochu azhi, meaning 'small lagoon'. Accounts by the Italian explorers Nicolo Conti (in the 15th century) and Fra Paoline (in the 17th century) say that it was called Kochchi, named after the river connecting the backwaters to the sea. After the arrival of the Portuguese, and later the British, the name Cochin stuck as the official appellation. The city reverted to a closer transcription of its original Malayalam name, Kochi, in 1996. This change in name was challenged by the city municipal corporation, but the court later dismissed the plea.

== History ==
Muziris, a port somewhere north of Kochi (mostly identified with Kodungallur in Thrissur district), was the centre of Indian spice trade for many centuries, and was known to the Arabs, Yavanas (Greeks and Romans) as well as Jews, Syrians, and Chinese since ancient times. Kochi rose to significance as a trading centre after the port Muziris around Kodungallur (Cranganore) was destroyed by the massive flooding of Periyar in 1341. The earliest documented references to Kochi occur in books written by Chinese voyager Ma Huan during his visit to Kochi in the 15th century as part of Admiral Zheng He's treasure fleet. There are also references to Kochi in accounts written by Italian traveller Niccolò Da Conti, who visited Kochi in 1440. The ruler of Perumpadappu (near Ponnani) fled to Kodungallur in the early medieval period, when the Zamorin of Calicut annexed Ponnani region, after Tirunavaya war. They later moved to Kochi and established the Kingdom of Cochin. When Vasco Da Gama landed at Kozhikode and the Zamorin of Calicut fought against the Portuguese with Kunjali Marakkar, the ruler of Cochin aligned with the Portuguese.

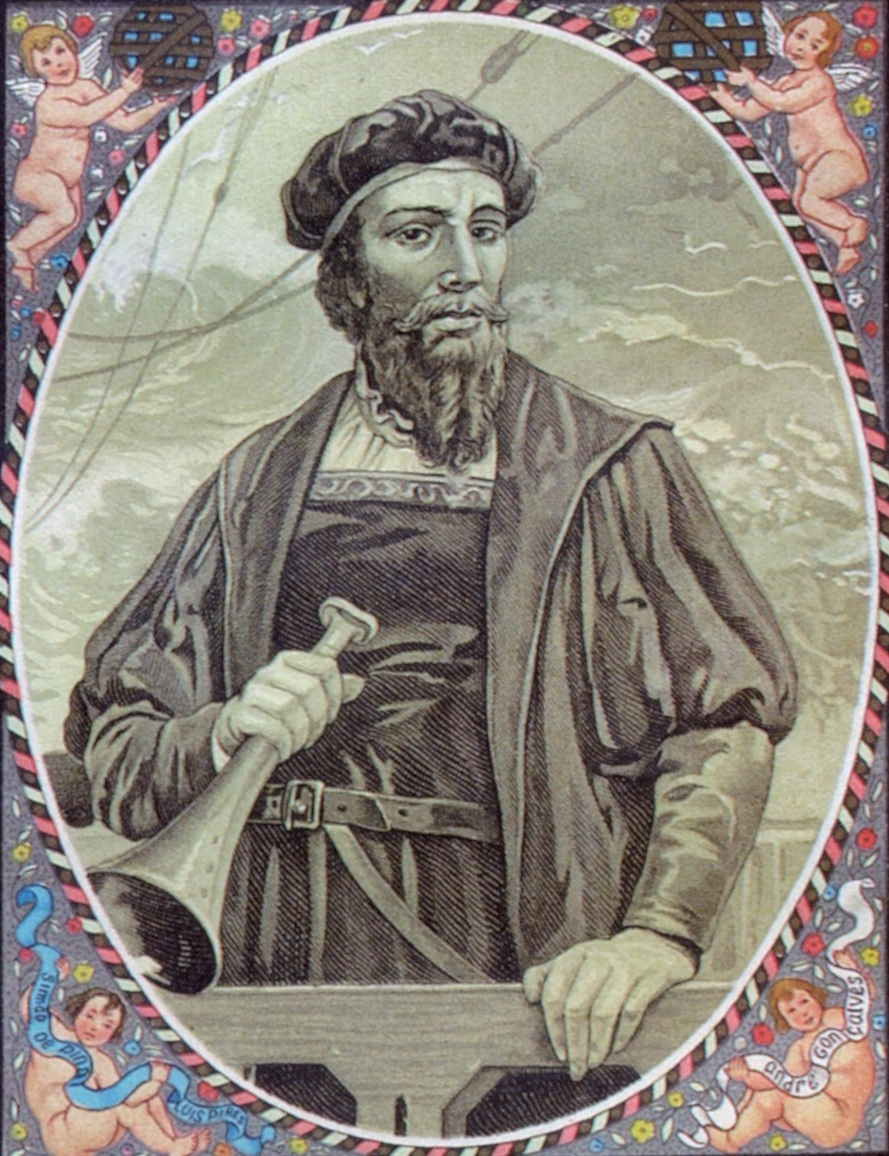
Portuguese explorer Pedro Álvares Cabral established Portuguese forts in the city. (Portuguese: Cochim) in 1500, which lasted until 1663.

On the Malabar coast during the early 15th century, Calicut and Kochi were in an intense rivalry, so the Ming dynasty of China decided to intervene by granting special status to Kochi and its ruler known as Keyili (可亦里) to the Chinese. Calicut had been the dominant port-city in the region, but Kochi was emerging as its main rival. For the fifth Ming treasure voyage, Admiral Zheng He was instructed to confer a seal upon Keyili of Kochi and enfeoff a mountain in his kingdom as the Zhenguo Zhi Shan (鎮國之山, Mountain Which Protects the Country). Zheng He delivered a stone tablet, inscribed with a proclamation composed by the Yongle Emperor himself, to Kochi. As long as Kochi remained under the protection of Ming China, the Zamorin of Calicut was unable to invade Kochi and a military conflict was averted. The cessation of the Ming treasure voyages consequently had negative results for Kochi, as the Zamorin of Calicut would eventually launch an invasion against Kochi. In the late 15th century, the Zamorin occupied Kochi and installed his representative as the king of the port-city.

Names, routes and locations of the Periplus of the Erythraean Sea (1st century CE)

According to many historians, the precursor state to Kingdom of Kochi came into existence in the early 12th century, after the fall of the Chera Kingdom. The reign of the Kingdom was hereditary, and the family that ruled over the region was known as the Perumpadappu Swaroopam in the local vernacular.

The port at Kozhikode held superior economic and political position in medieval Kerala coast, while Kannur, Kollam, and Kochi, were commercially important secondary ports, where the traders from various parts of the world would gather. The Portuguese arrived at Kappad Kozhikode in 1498 during the Age of Discovery, thus opening a direct sea route from Europe to India. Portuguese navigator, Pedro Álvares Cabral founded the first European settlement in India at Kochi in 1500. From 1503 to 1663, Fort Kochi (Fort Emmanuel) was ruled by Portugal. This Portuguese period was a harrowing time for the Saint Thomas Christians, Muslim Mappilas, and the Jews, as the Inquisition was active in Portuguese India. The ruler of the Kingdom of Tanur, who was a vassal to the Zamorin of Calicut, sided with the Portuguese, against his overlord at Kozhikode. As a result, the Kingdom of Tanur (Vettathunadu) became one of the earliest Portuguese Colonies in India. The ruler of Tanur also sided with Cochin. Many of the members of the royal family of Cochin in 16th and 17th centuries were selected from Vettom. However, the Tanur forces under the king fought for the Zamorin of Calicut in the Battle of Cochin (1504). However, the allegiance of the Mappila merchants in Tanur region still stayed under the Zamorin of Calicut. Kochi hosted the grave of Vasco da Gama, the first European explorer to set sail for India, who was buried at St. Francis Church until his remains were returned to Portugal in 1539. The Portuguese rule was followed by that of the Dutch who renamed Fort Immanuel as Fort Stormsburg. In meantime, the Royal Family of Kochi relocated the capital of Kochi Kingdom to Thrissur, leaving nominal authority over Islands of Kochi. In 1664, Fort Kochi Municipality was established by Dutch, making it the first municipality in Indian subcontinent, which got dissolved when Dutch authority got weaker in the 18th century. The remaining part of Kochi were governed by governors of Kochi Kingdom. By 1773, the Mysore ruler Hyder Ali extended his conquest in the Malabar region to Kochi forcing it to become a tributary of Mysore. The hereditary Prime Ministership of Kochi held by the Paliath Achans ended during this period.

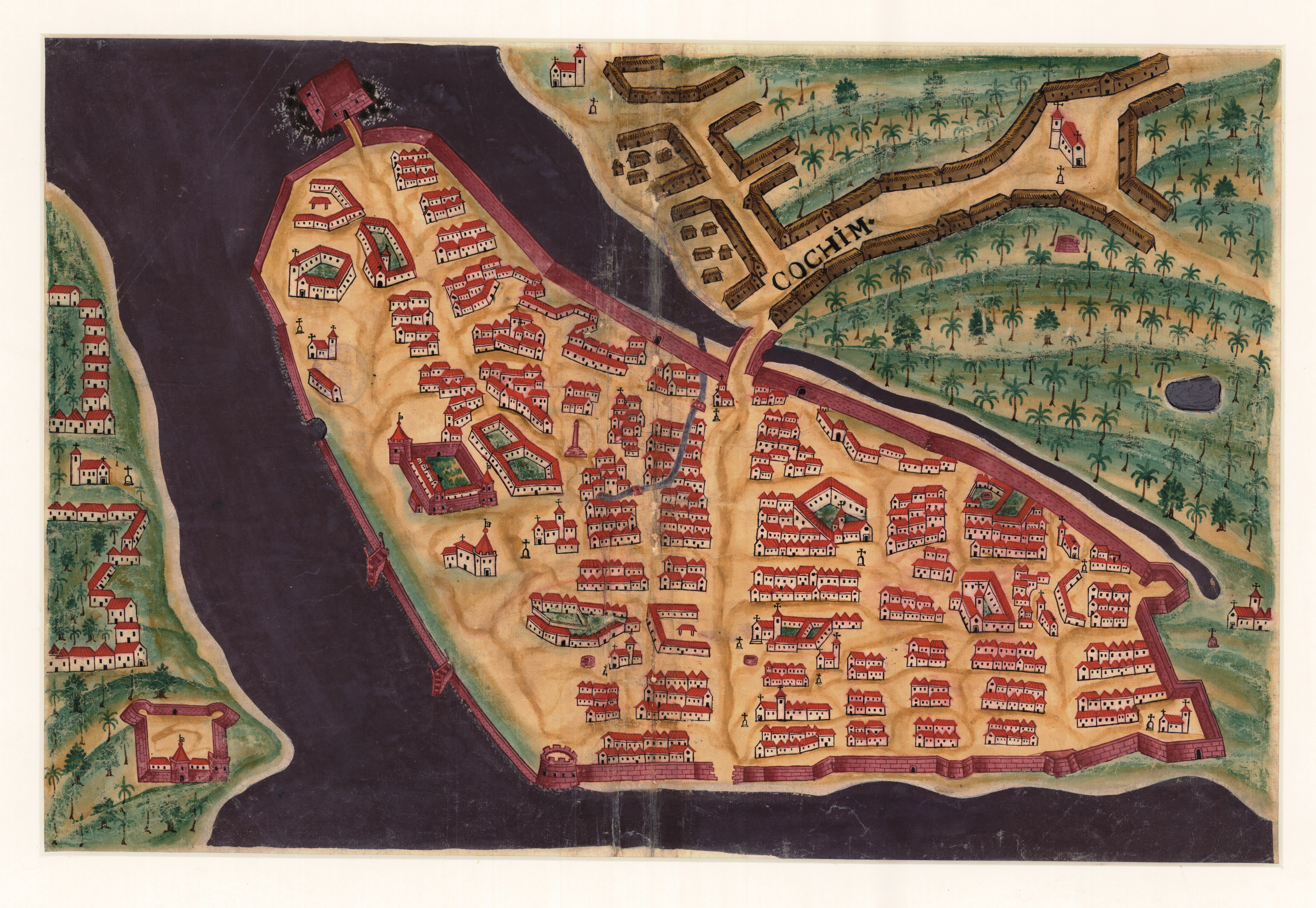
Map of Kochi in the 1635 Livro das Plantas de Todas as Fortalezas, a catalogue of Portuguese forts in India

Meanwhile, the Dutch, fearing an outbreak of war on the United Provinces, signed the Anglo-Dutch Treaty of 1814 with the United Kingdom, under which Kochi was ceded to the United Kingdom in exchange for the island of Bangka, east of Sumatra. However, there are evidences of English habitation in the region even before the signing of the treaty. In 1866, Fort Kochi municipality was reinstalled. Fort Kochi, which was a part of Malabar District until 1956, was made a municipality on 1 November 1866, along with Kannur, Thalassery, Kozhikode, and Palakkad, according to the Madras Act 10 of 1865 (Amendment of the Improvements in Towns act 1850) of the British Indian Empire. Its first Municipal Council seating contest was conducted in 1883. In 1896, H.H. Rama Varma XV, The Maharaja of Cochin, initiated local administration by forming town councils in Mattancherry and Ernakulam. In 1907, the Governor of the Madras Presidency, Sir Arthur Lawley and his brother, Beilby Lawley, 3rd Baron Wenlock, Governor of Madras, 1891 to 1896, left for an official tour of Cochin and Travancore, which lasted from 25 January to 14 February. On 26 January, they were met by His Highness the Rajah of Cochin who gave a State Dinner in their honour at Ernakulam. By the 1870s, the capital of Kochi Kingdom was relocated again to Kochi Suburb of Tripunithura. In 1910, Ernakulam became the administrative capital of Kochi Kingdom with establishment of Royal Secretariat and State Durbar. The offices of the Diwan and High court were soon moved into Ernakulam.

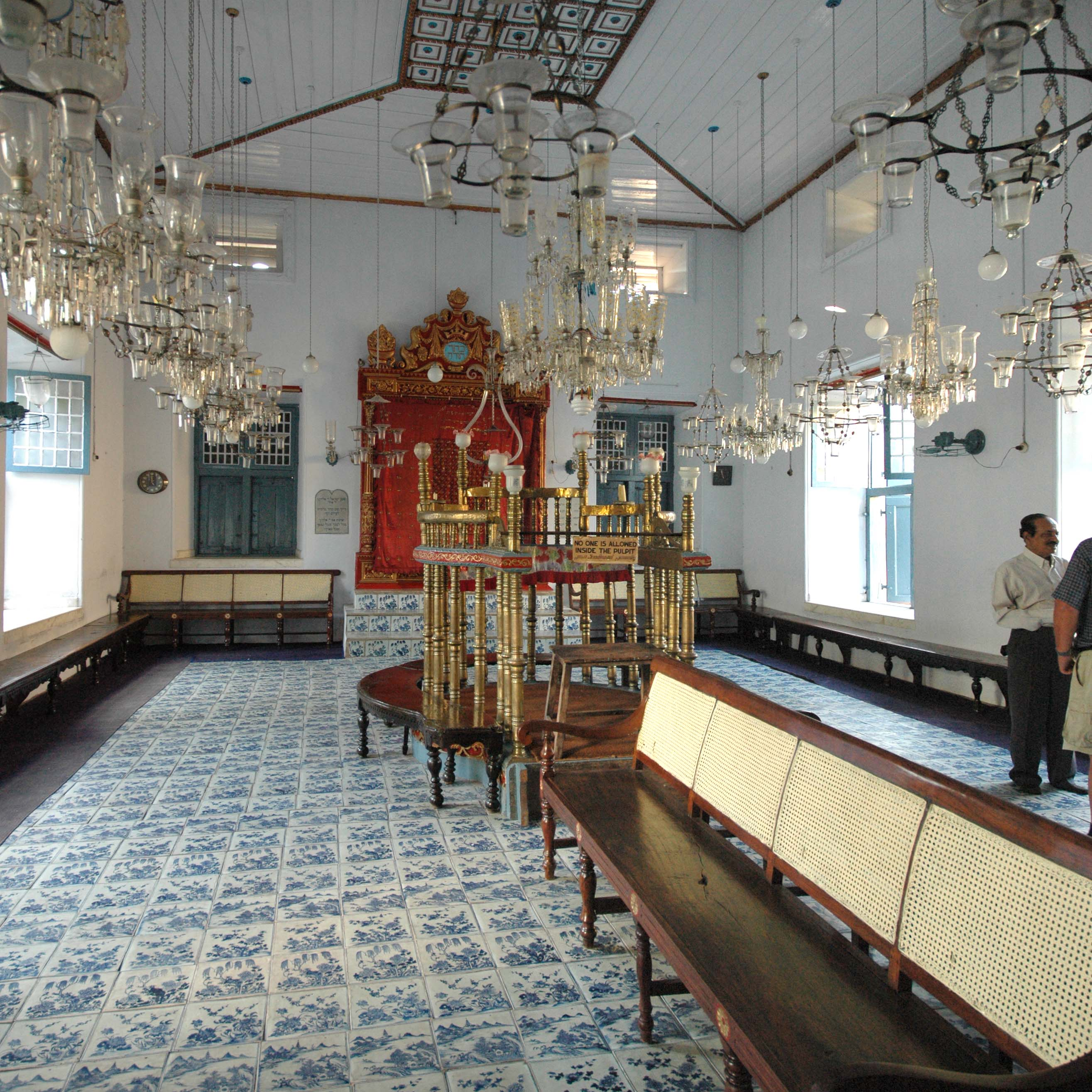
The Paradesi Synagogue is the oldest active synagogue in both India and the Commonwealth of Nations.

In 1925, Kochi legislative assembly was constituted due to public pressure on the state. Towards the early 20th century, trade at the port had increased substantially, and the need to develop the port was greatly felt. Harbour engineer Robert Bristow was brought to Kochi in 1920 under the direction of Lord Willingdon, then the Governor of Madras. In a span of 21 years, he transformed Kochi as one of the safest harbours in the peninsula, where ships berthed alongside the newly reclaimed inner harbour equipped with a long array of steam cranes.

In 1947, when India gained independence from the British colonial rule, Cochin was the first princely state to join India willingly. In 1949, Travancore–Cochin state came into being with the merger of Cochin and Travancore. The King of Travancore was the Rajpramukh of the Travancore–Cochin Union from 1949 to 1956. Travancore-Cochin, was in turn merged with the Malabar district of the Madras State. Finally, the Government of India's States Reorganisation Act (1956) inaugurated a new state—Kerala—incorporating Travancore-Cochin (excluding the four southern Taluks which were merged with Tamil Nadu), Malabar District, and the taluk of Kasargod, South Kanara. The Ernakulam district was formed on 1 April 1958 carving areas of the erstwhile Travancore-Kochi-Malabar regions. A major portion of the district is from the Kochi kingdom. On 9 July 1960 the Mattancherry council passed a resolution—which was forwarded to the government—requesting the formation of a municipal corporation by combining the existing municipalities of Fort Kochi, Mattancherry, and Ernakulam. The government appointed a commission to study the feasibility of the suggested merger. Based on its report, the Kerala Legislative Assembly approved the corporation's formation. On 1 November 1967, exactly eleven years since the establishment of the state of Kerala, the Kochi Municipal Corporation came into existence. The merger leading to the establishment of the corporation, was between the municipalities of Ernakulam, Mattancherry and Fort Kochi, along with that of the Willingdon Island, four panchayats (Palluruthy, Vennala, Vyttila and Edappally), and the small islands of Gundu and Ramanthuruth.

The city's economic growth gathered momentum after economic reforms in India introduced by the central government in the early 1990s. Since 2000, the service sector has energised the city's economy. The establishment of several industrial parks based on IT and other port based infrastructure triggered a construction and realty boom in the city. Over the years, Kochi has witnessed rapid commercialisation, and has grown into the commercial hub of Kerala.

== Geography and climate ==
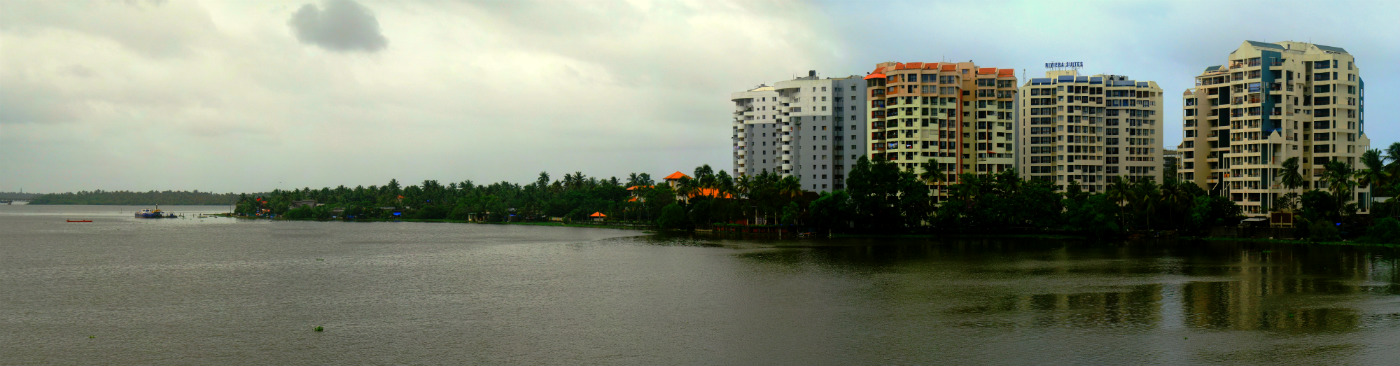
A view of Thevara from Kundannur bridge

=== Geography ===
Kochi is located on the southwest coast of India at 9°58′N 76°13′E, with a corporation limit area of 94.88 km^{2} (36.63 sq mi). Over the years, the city has expanded considerably outside the corporation limit set in 1967, although the official city limits have not been changed. The city straddles the backwaters, encompassing the northern end of a peninsula, several islands and a portion of the mainland. To the west lies the Laccadive Sea, and to the east is the urbanised region in the rest of the mainland area. Much of Kochi lies at sea level, with a coastline of 48 km.

The eastern part of Kochi is mainly known as Ernakulam, while the western part of it after the Venduruthy Bridge is called as Western Kochi. The current metropolitan limits of Kochi include the mainland Ernakulam, Fort Kochi, the suburbs of Edapally, Kalamassery, Aluva, Perumbavoor, Angamaly and Kakkanad to the northeast; Tripunithura to the southeast; and a group of islands closely scattered in the Vembanad Lake. The state government and the GCDA have plans to include Mala and Kodungallur in Thrissur district. Piravom and Kolenchery in Ernakulam district, Thalayolaparambu and Vaikom in Kottayam and Cherthala in Alappuzha district within Kochi metropolitan limits. The newly formed metropolis would be put under the charge of a new authority called Kochi Metropolitan Regional Development Authority. However, The Hindu reported that the state government is yet to take any concrete steps in this regard.

Soil consists of sediments such as alluvium, teris, brown sands, etc. Hydromorphic saline soils are also found in the areas surrounding the backwaters.

Predominant rock types found here are Archaean-basic dykes, Charnockites and Gneisses. An ecologically sensitive area, the Mangalavanam Bird Sanctuary is located in the central part of the city. It has a wide range of mangrove species and is a nesting ground for a vast variety of migratory birds.

Kochi's water needs are entirely dependent on ground water and the Periyar and Muvattupuzha rivers flowing through the district. The Periyar serves the entire northern part of the city and the Muvattupuzha river under the JnNurm project covers the western part.

=== Climate ===
Under the Köppen climate classification, Kochi features a tropical monsoon climate (Am). Kochi's proximity to the equator along with its coastal location results in little seasonal temperature variation, with moderate to high levels of humidity. Annual temperatures range between 23 and 31 °C (73 and 88 °F) with the record high being 36.5 °C (97.7 °F), and record low 16.3 °C (61.3 °F). From June to September, the south-west monsoon brings in heavy rains as Kochi lies on the windward side of the Western Ghats. From October to December, Kochi receives lighter (yet significant) rain from the northeast monsoon, as it lies on the leeward side. Average annual rainfall is 3,014.9 mm (118.70 in), with an annual average of 124 rainy days.

Climate data for Kochi (Cochin International Airport) 1991–2020
Month	Jan	Feb	Mar	Apr	May	Jun	Jul	Aug	Sep	Oct	Nov	Dec	Year
Record high °C (°F)	37.1 (98.8)	37.6 (99.7)	38.1 (100.6)	38.0 (100.4)	36.8 (98.2)	34.6 (94.3)	33.8 (92.8)	35.6 (96.1)	34.1 (93.4)	35.4 (95.7)	35.4 (95.7)	35.3 (95.5)	38.1 (100.6)
Mean daily maximum °C (°F)	33.7 (92.7)	34.6 (94.3)	34.8 (94.6)	34.4 (93.9)	33.2 (91.8)	30.7 (87.3)	30.0 (86.0)	30.2 (86.4)	30.9 (87.6)	31.8 (89.2)	32.6 (90.7)	32.9 (91.2)	32.5 (90.5)
Mean daily minimum °C (°F)	20.6 (69.1)	21.8 (71.2)	23.9 (75.0)	24.7 (76.5)	24.5 (76.1)	23.5 (74.3)	23.1 (73.6)	23.3 (73.9)	23.3 (73.9)	23.2 (73.8)	22.9 (73.2)	21.8 (71.2)	23.1 (73.6)
Record low °C (°F)	15.7 (60.3)	14.8 (58.6)	16.7 (62.1)	20.1 (68.2)	17.8 (64.0)	20.0 (68.0)	20.8 (69.4)	20.9 (69.6)	20.9 (69.6)	20.6 (69.1)	17.2 (63.0)	15.9 (60.6)	14.8 (58.6)
Average rainfall mm (inches)	1.8 (0.07)	14.5 (0.57)	39.5 (1.56)	116.0 (4.57)	225.4 (8.87)	595.8 (23.46)	571.0 (22.48)	458.3 (18.04)	358.8 (14.13)	343.2 (13.51)	175.9 (6.93)	53.4 (2.10)	2,953.5 (116.28)
Average rainy days	0.3	0.9	2.4	6.8	10.6	22.9	23.6	17.9	16.1	13.8	7.4	2.2	125.0
Average relative humidity (%) (at 17:30 IST)	54	55	61	68	71	79	80	78	76	76	72	62	69
Source: India Meteorological Department

Climate data for Kochi (Kochi Naval Base) 1981–2010, extremes 1951–2012
Month	Jan	Feb	Mar	Apr	May	Jun	Jul	Aug	Sep	Oct	Nov	Dec	Year
Record high °C (°F)	36.4 (97.5)	35.7 (96.3)	36.0 (96.8)	36.5 (97.7)	35.2 (95.4)	34.2 (93.6)	33.1 (91.6)	32.5 (90.5)	34.2 (93.6)	34.6 (94.3)	35.0 (95.0)	35.2 (95.4)	36.5 (97.7)
Mean daily maximum °C (°F)	31.9 (89.4)	32.0 (89.6)	32.6 (90.7)	33.0 (91.4)	32.4 (90.3)	30.3 (86.5)	29.6 (85.3)	29.5 (85.1)	30.2 (86.4)	30.7 (87.3)	31.3 (88.3)	31.9 (89.4)	31.3 (88.3)
Mean daily minimum °C (°F)	23.0 (73.4)	24.2 (75.6)	25.5 (77.9)	25.9 (78.6)	25.7 (78.3)	24.2 (75.6)	23.8 (74.8)	24.0 (75.2)	24.2 (75.6)	24.1 (75.4)	24.1 (75.4)	23.2 (73.8)	24.3 (75.7)
Record low °C (°F)	16.5 (61.7)	16.3 (61.3)	21.6 (70.9)	21.2 (70.2)	21.1 (70.0)	20.4 (68.7)	17.6 (63.7)	20.6 (69.1)	21.1 (70.0)	19.2 (66.6)	19.2 (66.6)	17.7 (63.9)	16.3 (61.3)
Average rainfall mm (inches)	24.3 (0.96)	27.1 (1.07)	45.0 (1.77)	113.1 (4.45)	284.5 (11.20)	700.3 (27.57)	575.5 (22.66)	378.8 (14.91)	310.3 (12.22)	366.6 (14.43)	150.4 (5.92)	39.0 (1.54)	3,014.9 (118.70)
Average rainy days	1.1	1.2	2.6	6.9	11.0	23.0	22.8	19.0	13.4	14.2	7.2	1.8	124.2
Average relative humidity (%) (at 17:30 IST)	61	65	68	70	73	82	83	82	79	77	72	64	73
Average ultraviolet index	11	12	12	12	12	12	12	12	12	12	10	10	12
Source 1: India Meteorological Department
Source 2: Weather Atlas

== Civic administration ==
Kochi Municipal Corporation officials		Party	Ref
Mayor	Adv. Minimol K.V	INC	(elected) Incumbent since 2025
Deputy Mayor	Deepak Joy	INC	(elected) Incumbent since 2025
Corporation Secretary	P.S. Shibu		(appointed by the state government)

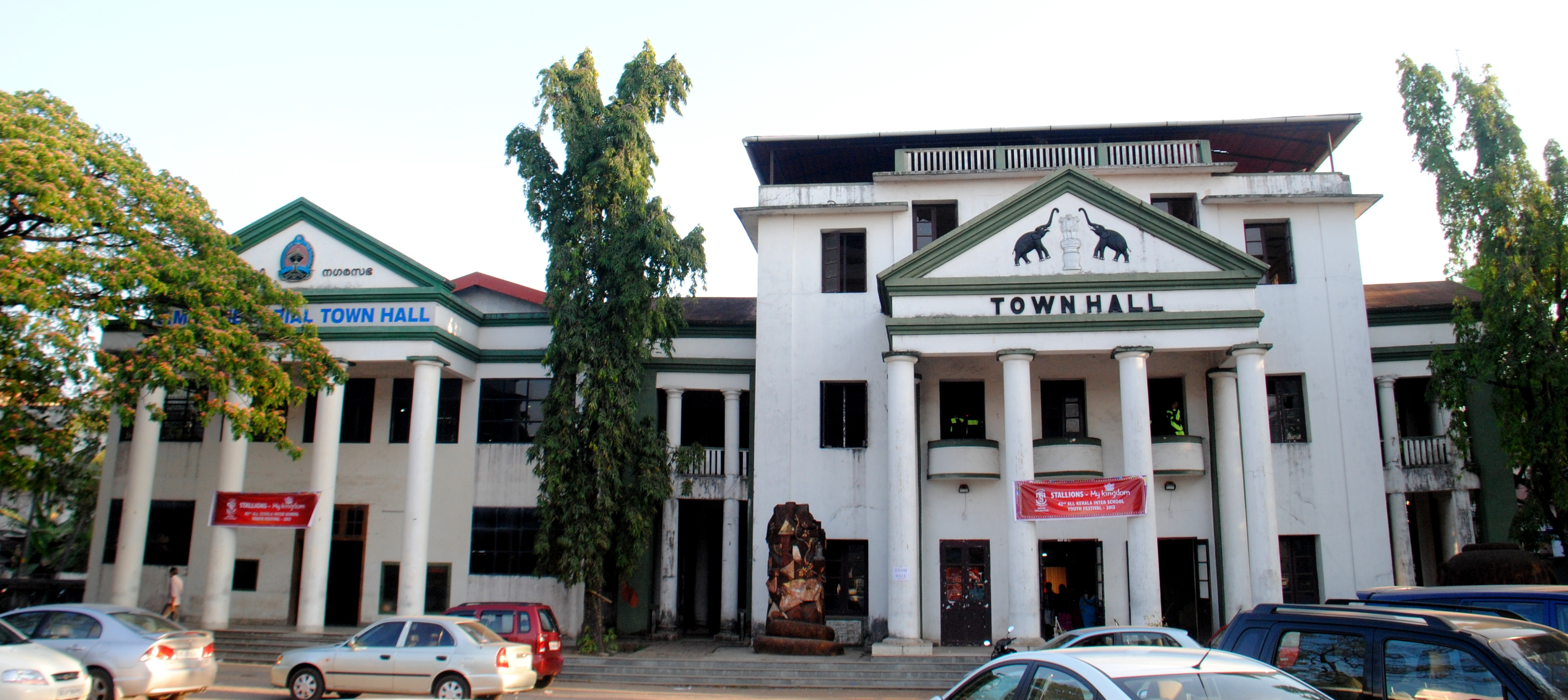
Kochi Municipal Corporation Town Hall

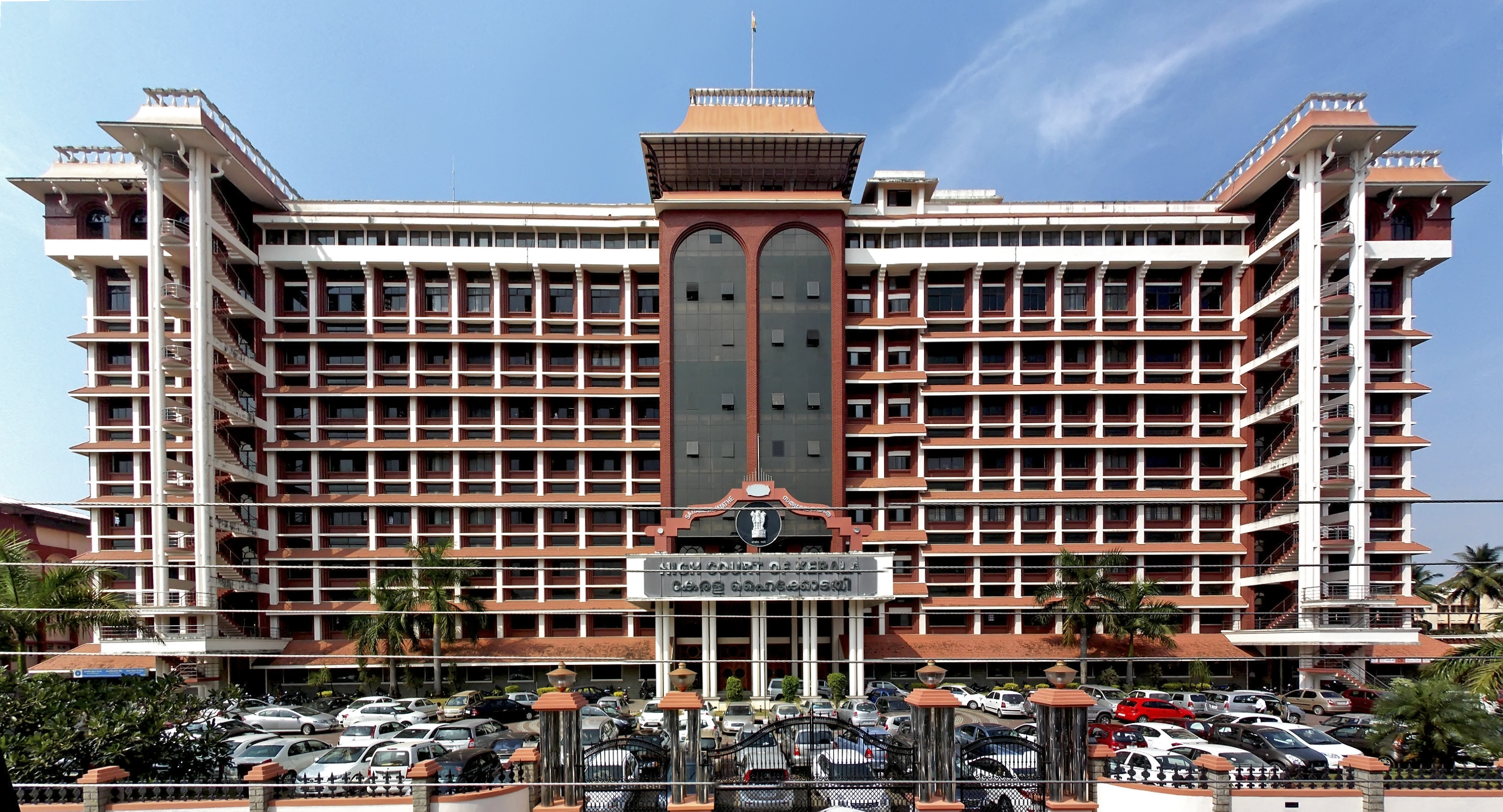
The High Court of Kerala located in the city is the highest court in Kerala

The city is governed by the Kochi Corporation, headed by a mayor. For administrative purposes, the city is divided into 76 wards, from which the members of the corporation council are elected for five years. Earlier; Fort Kochi, Mattancherry and Ernakulam were the three Municipalities in Cochin area, which was later merged to form the Cochin Corporation. The corporation has its headquarters in Ernakulam, and zonal offices at Fort Kochi, Mattancherry, Palluruthy, Edappally and Pachalam. The general administration of the city is handled by the Personnel Department and the Council Standing committee Section. Other departments include that of town planning, health, engineering, revenue and accounts. The corporation is also responsible for waste disposal and sewage management. The city produces more than 600 tons of waste per day and a large portion of waste is decomposed at Brahmapuram Solid Waste plant into organic manure. The supply of potable water, sourced from the Periyar River is handled by Kerala Water Authority with support of Water works department of Kochi Corporation. Electricity is provided by the Kerala State Electricity Board. The GCDA and GIDA are the government agencies initiating and monitoring the development of Greater Cochin area, mainly in developing infrastructure facilities for the city.

The Council of the Kochi Municipal Corporation is the city's legislative body comprising elected councillors from each ward. Chosen through elections every five years, it is headed by the Mayor, assisted by the Deputy Mayor, and is responsible for local governance, policy decisions, and civic administration. The Secretary is the chief administrative officer of the Kochi Municipal Corporation, handling administration and execution of council decisions.

=== Municipal finance ===
According to financial data published on the CityFinance Portal of the Ministry of Housing and Urban Affairs, the Kochi Municipal Corporation reported total revenue receipts of ₹467 crore (US$56 million) and total expenditure of ₹425 crore (US$51 million) in 2022–23. Tax revenue accounted for about 34.9% of the total revenue, while the corporation received ₹268 crore in grants during the financial year.

=== Law and order ===
Kochi is the seat of the High Court of Kerala, the highest judicial body in the state. It is often referred to as the judicial capital of Kerala. There are court complexes at Ernakulam, Panampilly Nagar, Kochi, North Paravur, and Kaloor, housing various courts. Kochi is part of the Ernakulam Judicial District and has a District Court Complex at Marine Drive, Kochi. The district has four Subordinate Judges/Assistant Sessions Courts in Ernakulam City and one at Kochi. The Chief Judicial Magistrate (CJM) Court at Ernakulam is the chief criminal court, with six Judicial First Class Magistrate Courts in the city. For civil matters, there are four Munsiff Courts in Ernakulam City and two at Kochi. The city also hosts several special courts, tribunals, and other judicial institutions, serving as the judicial capital of Kerala.

The Kochi City Police, a division of the Kerala Police, is responsible for law enforcement and investigation within the city limits. The Kochi City Police has jurisdiction over the Kochi Corporation and the municipalities of Thrikkakara, Kalamassery, and Maradu, separate from the Ernakulam Rural Police. Headed by a Police Commissioner, an officer of the Indian Police Service (IPS), the city police is organized into four sub-divisions and operates 28 police stations. In addition to the regular law and order wing, the force includes the Kochi City Traffic Police, Highway Police, Special Branch, C- Branch, Narcotics Cell, Riot Control Unit, Armed Reserve Police, District Crime Records Bureau, Police Control Room and a Women's Police Station.

An anti-corruption branch of the Central Bureau of Investigation (CBI) also operates out of the city. CISF maintains 3 squadrons for providing security to various central and state heavy industries, airport and seaport zones. Other major central agencies are NIA, DRI and Indian Customs due to the presence of major port. According to National Crime Records Bureau (NCRB), Kochi reported significant increase of 193.7 per cent IPC crimes in 2010 compared to 2009, and reported a crime rate of 1,897.8 compared to the 424.1 in whole Kerala. However, the city police commissioner defended that in major crimes such as murders and kidnapping, the city registered a low crime rate even behind other cities in the state.

=== Politics ===
Kochi is part of the Ernakulam Lok Sabha constituency in Indian Parliament. The current elected Member of Parliament (Lok Sabha) representing the constituency is Hibi Eden of Indian National Congress. The Ernakulam Lok Sabha constituency elects seven members to the Kerala Legislative Assembly, one each from Ernakulam, Kalamassery, Kochi, Paravur, Thrikkakara, Thrippunithura and Vypin.

Within the Kochi Corporation limits, the city is represented in the Kerala Legislative Assembly by the Kochi and Ernakulam constituencies. The Kochi Assembly constituency is represented by K. J. Maxi (CPI(M)), and the Ernakulam constituency by T. J. Vinod (INC). The Thrikkakara and Thrippunithura assembly constituencies cover the suburban parts of Kochi city and its surroundings and are represented by Uma Thomas and K. Babu of the Indian National Congress.

Politics in Kochi is dominated by Kerala's two main coalitions—the Left Democratic Front (LDF) and the United Democratic Front (UDF). Local governance is managed by the Kochi Corporation, where control shifts between the Left Democratic Front (LDF) and the United Democratic Front (UDF) based on election outcomes.

In the 2025 local elections, the INC-led UDF won 47 of 76 seats in the Kochi Municipal Corporation. V. K. Minimol and Deepak Joy were elected Mayor and Deputy Mayor, while Shiny Mathew is set for a second term as Mayor.

== Economy ==
Kochi is widely referred to as the financial and commercial capital of Kerala. Federal Bank, the fourth-largest Private-sector bank in India is located in Aluva which is a suburb of Kochi. Being a major online trading centre in the country, Kochi has a newly opened SEBI office.

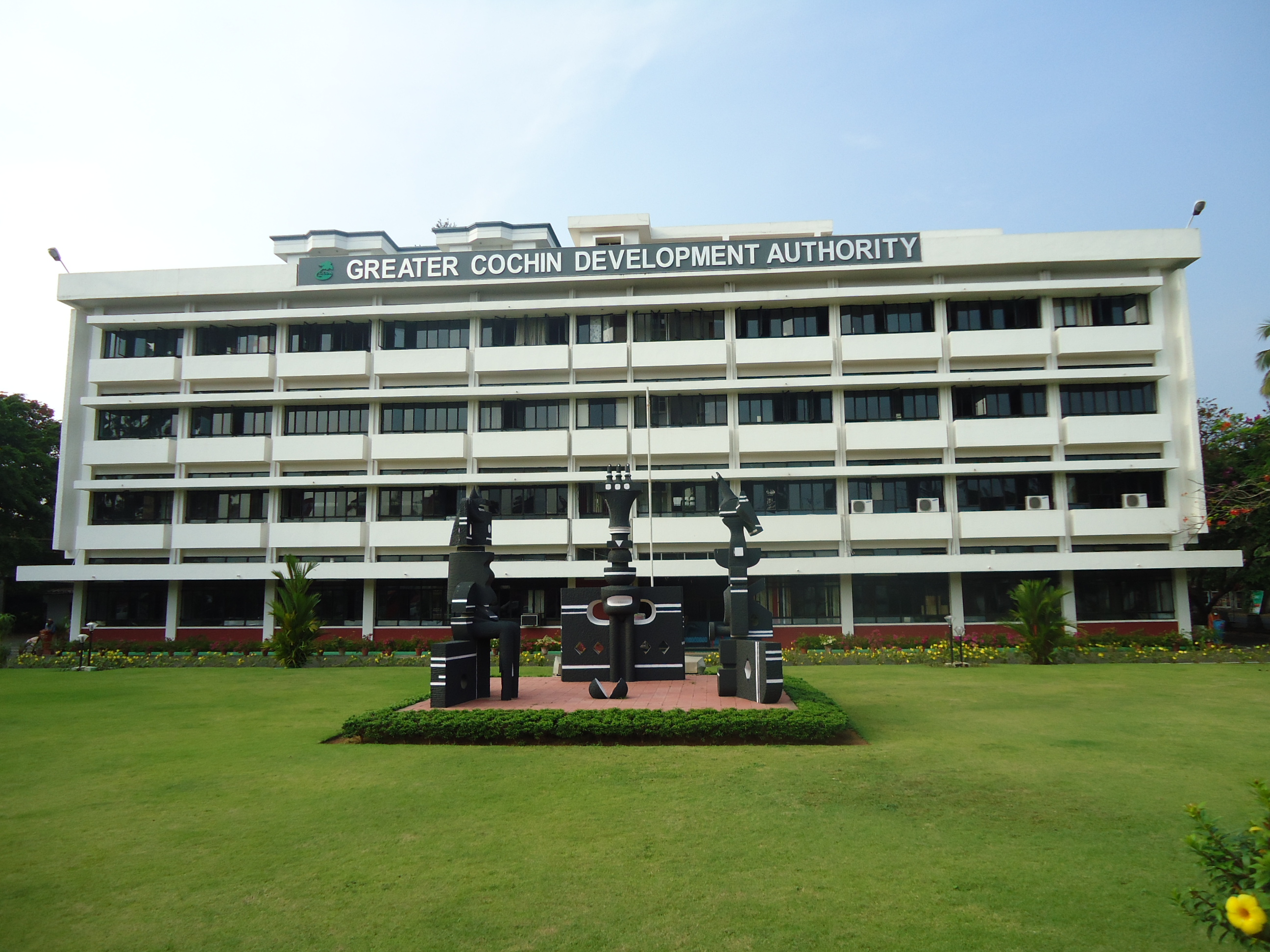
The Greater Cochin Development Authority is the statutory body overseeing the development of the city

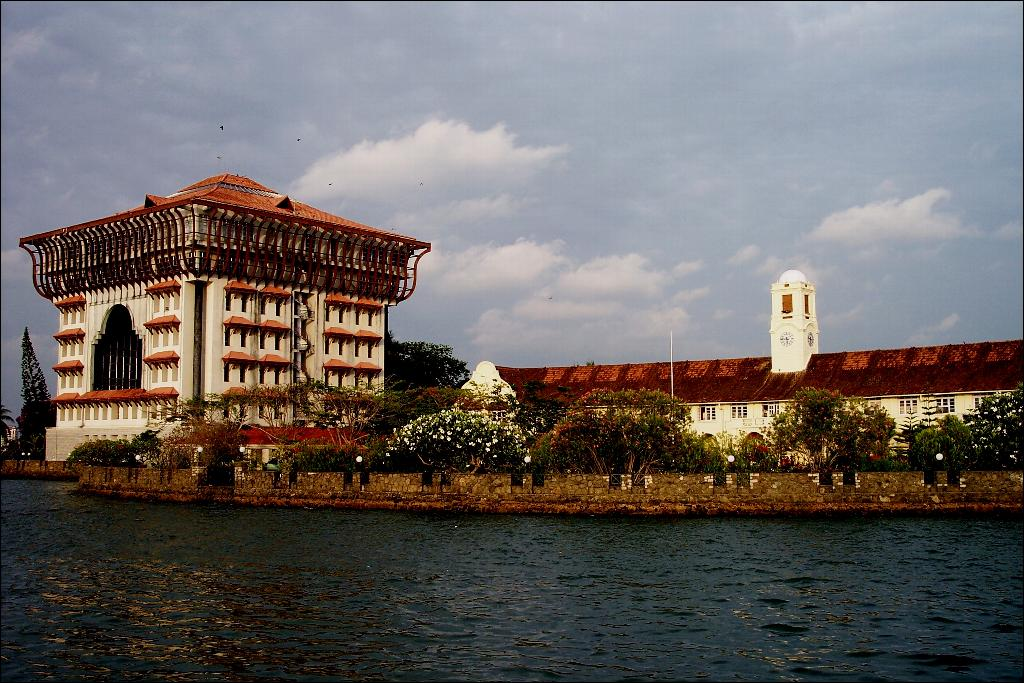
Established in 1926, the Cochin Port Trust overlooks the activities of Cochin Port

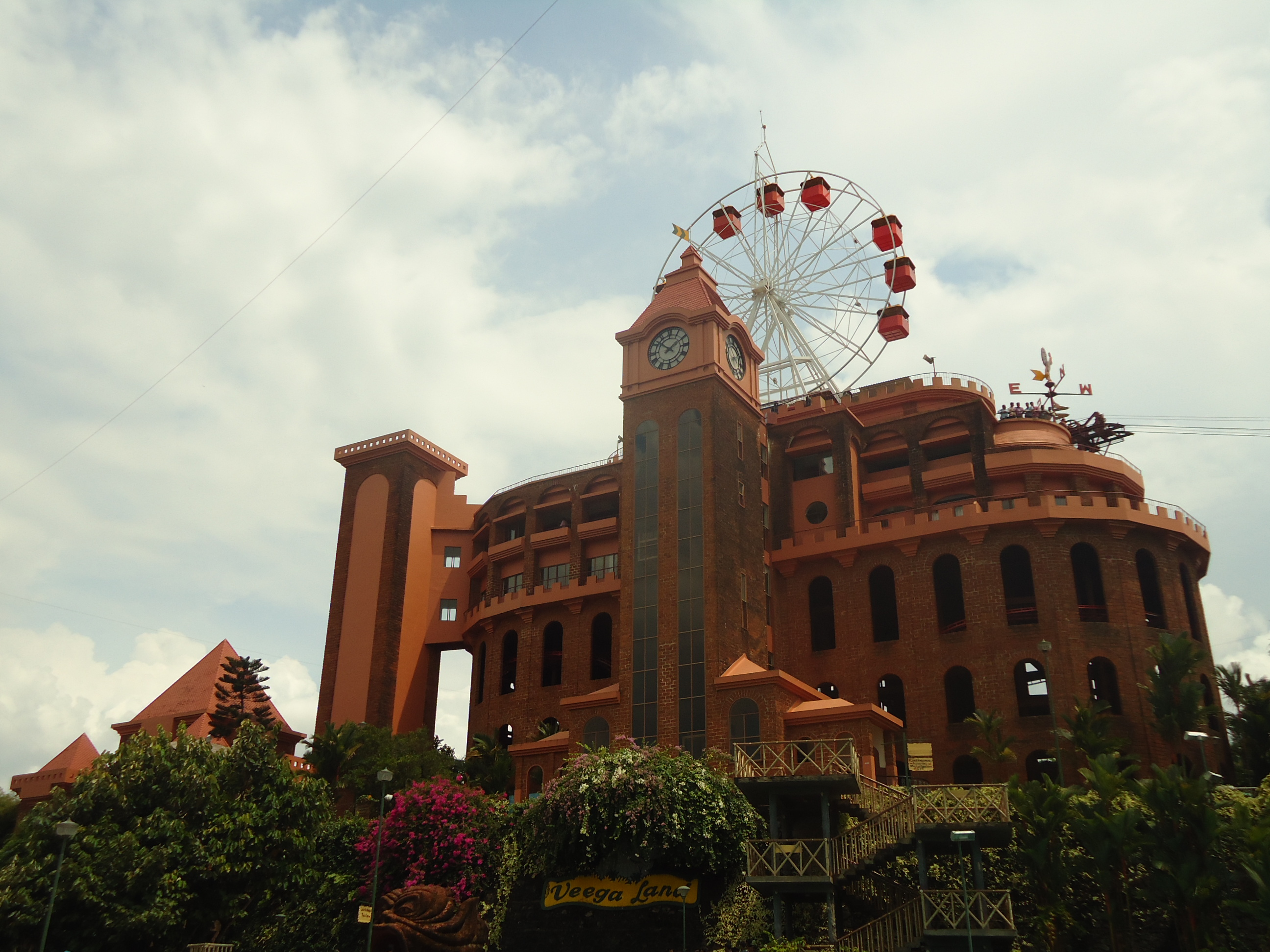
Wonderla amusement park, Kochi

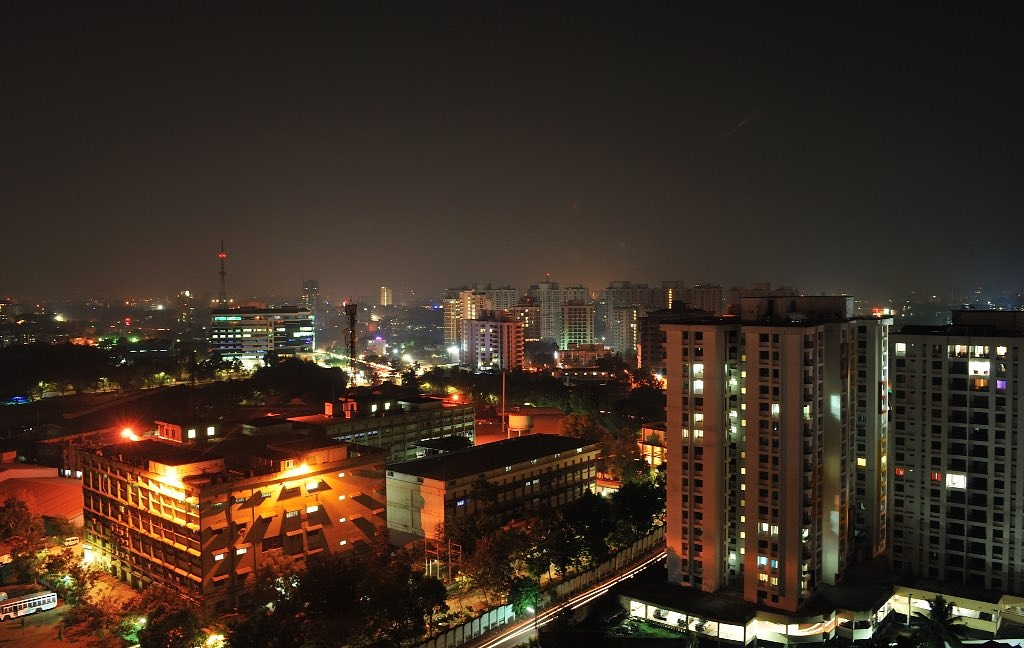
Kakkanad is a major industrial center and is home to the Cochin Special Economic Zone, Infopark and Smart City

Availability of electricity, fresh water, long coastline, backwaters, good banking facilities, presence of a major port, container trans-shipment terminal, harbour terminal and an international air terminal are some of the factors which accelerated the industrial growth in the city and its adjoining district. In recent years the city has witnessed heavy investment, thus making it one of the fastest-growing second-tier metro cities in India. Sales tax income generated in the Kochi metropolitan area contributes heavily to state revenue.

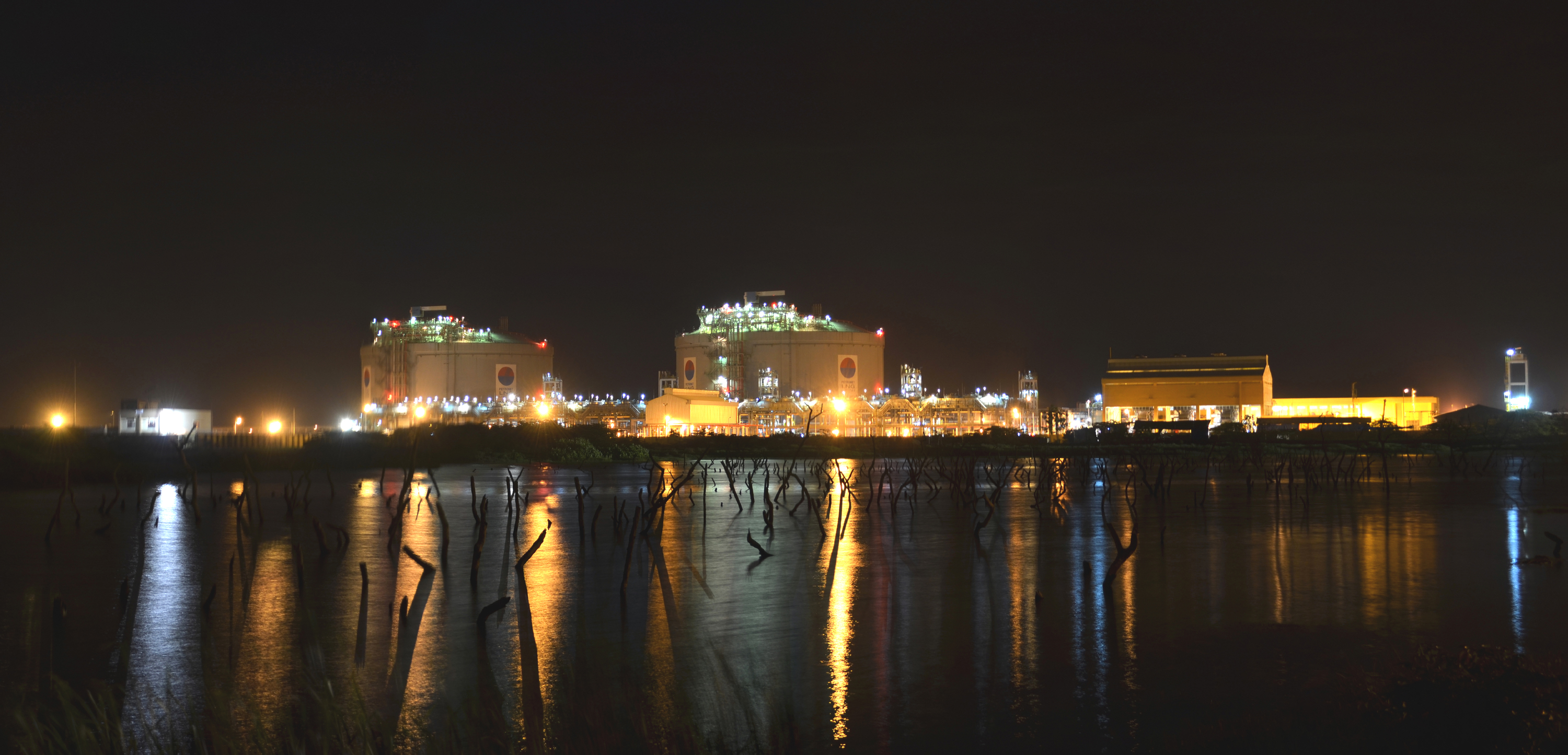
Kochi LNG Terminal

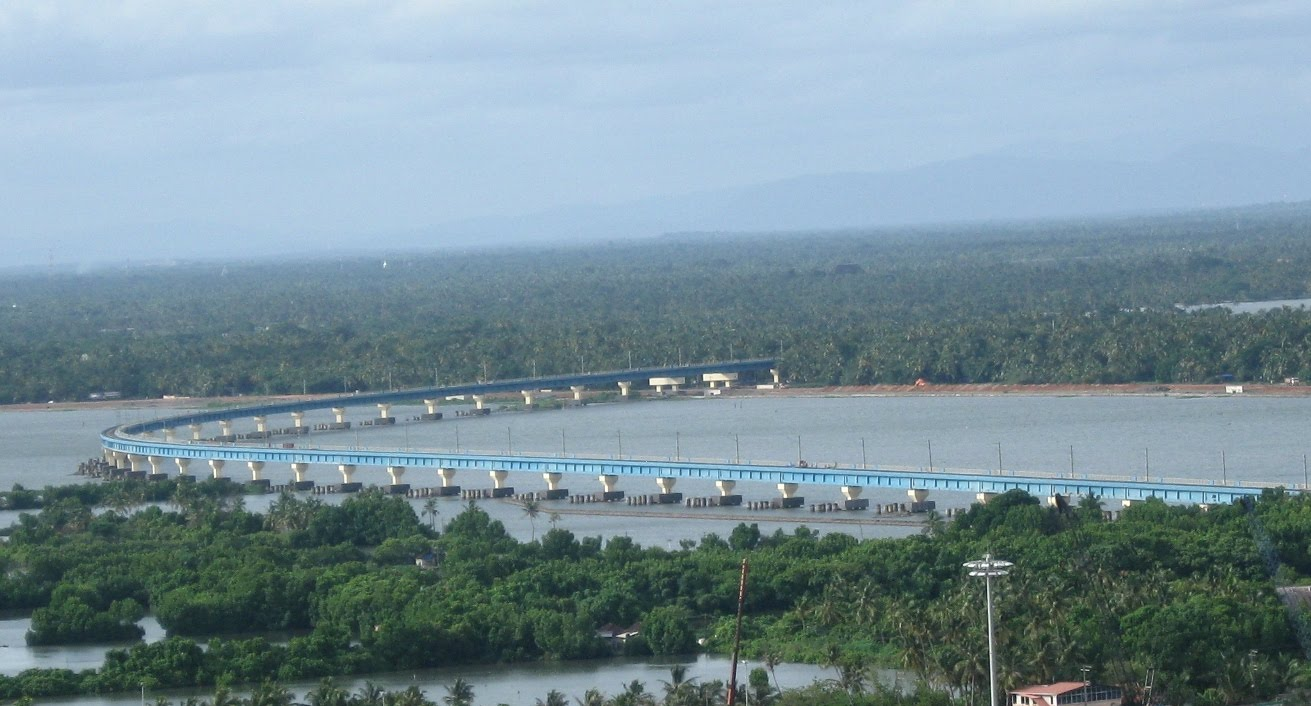
Vembanad Rail Bridge is the longest railway bridge in India

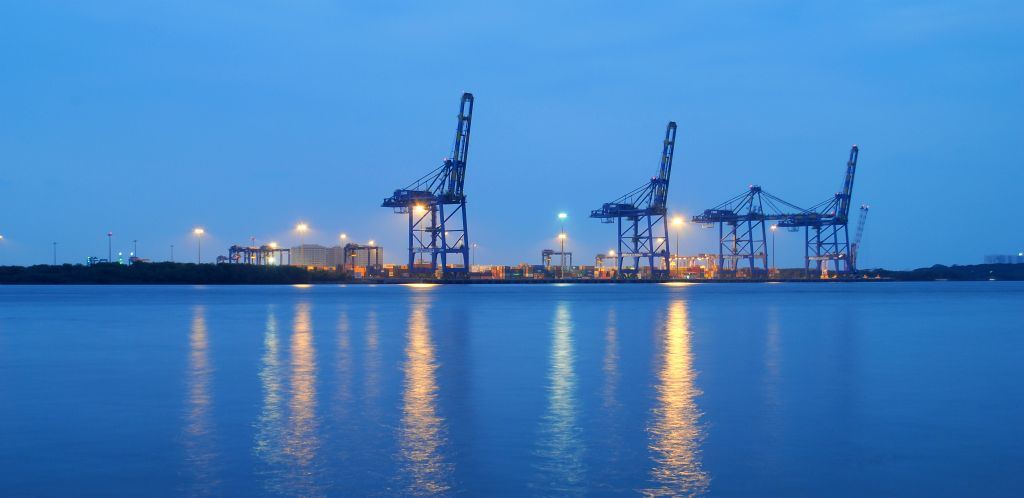
Vallarpadam Terminal is the first transshipment terminal in India

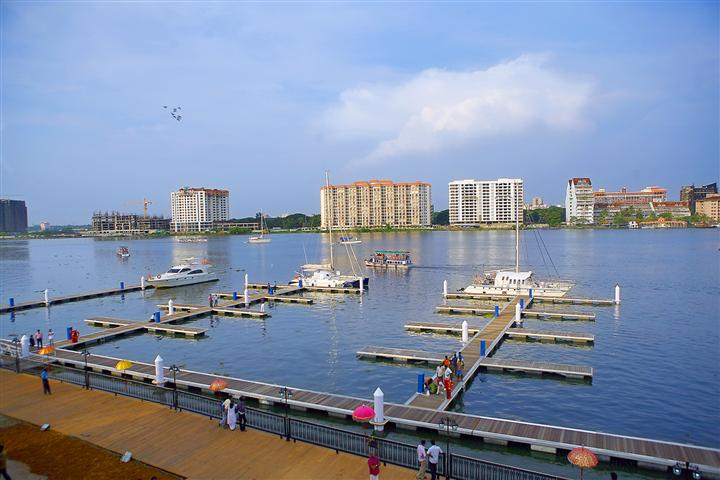
The Kochi International Marina is the only international marina in India

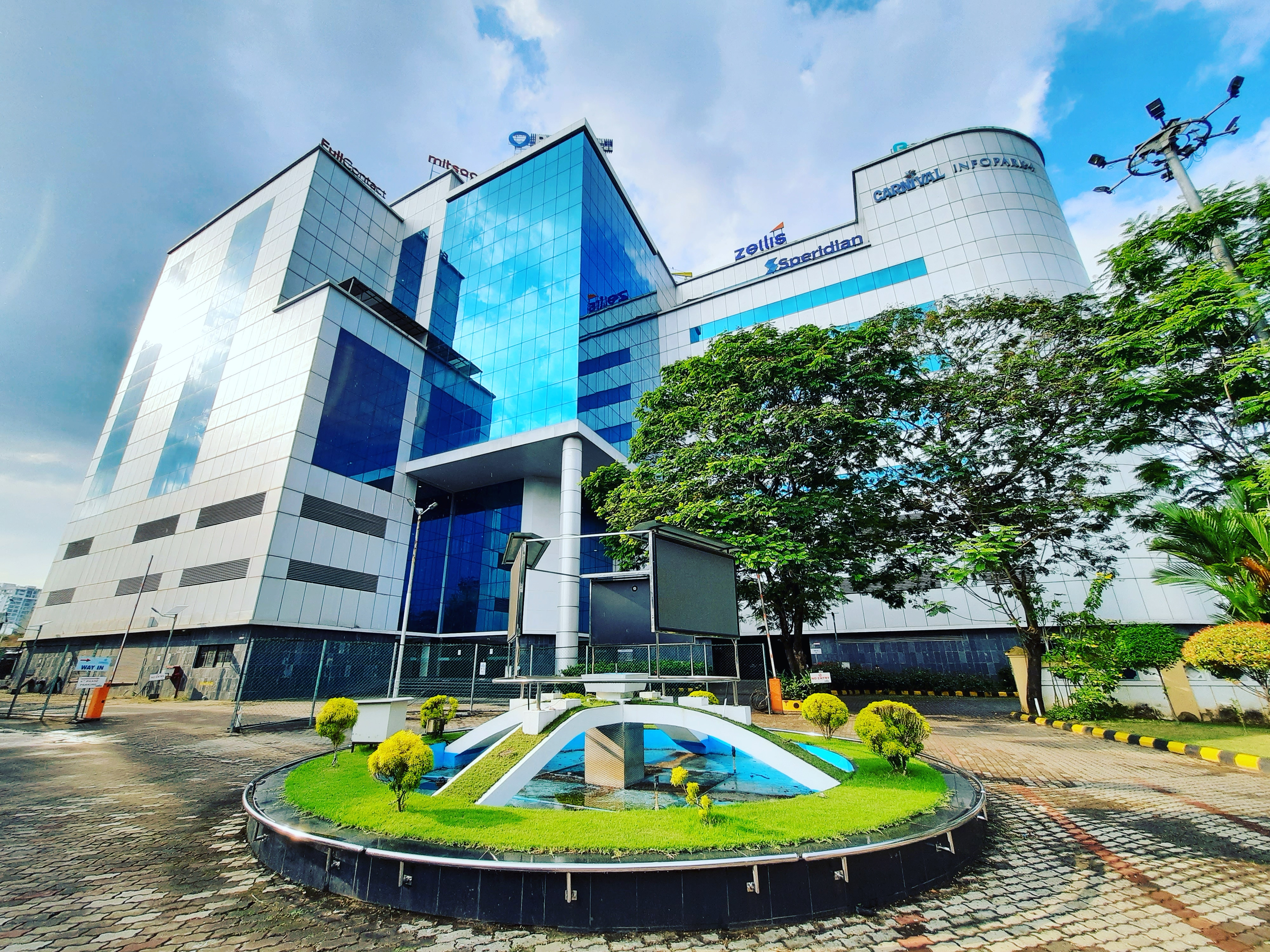
InfoPark, Kochi

The district contributes 15.1% of the state GDP. Construction and manufacturing industries combined contributes 37% of the district's total GDP, and trade, tourism and hospitality industries together provides another 20%. Major business sectors include construction, manufacturing, shipbuilding, transportation/shipping, seafood and spices exports, chemical industries, information technology (IT), tourism, health services, and banking. Kochi is recognised as one of the seventeen major industrial cities of India by the World Bank Group. However, in the 2009 rankings of ease to start and operate a business, among the 17 Indian cities selected, Kochi was rated as the second most difficult city to start business and was ranked 16th, above Kolkata.

As in most of Kerala, remittances from non-resident Indians (NRI)s is a major source of income. Eloor, situated 13 kilometres (8.1 miles) north of the city-centre, is the largest industrial belt in Kerala, with more than 250 factories manufacturing a range of products including chemical and petrochemical products, pesticides, rare earth elements, rubber processing chemicals, fertilisers, zinc and chromium compounds, and leather products. Fertilisers and Chemicals Travancore Limited (FACT), one of the oldest fertilizers and chemical industry in Kerala is located in Kochi. Kochi Refineries of (BPCL) at Ambalamugal is the largest state owned refinery in India. Petronet India has now almost completed Kochi LNG Terminal, for importing and storing natural gas, for energy and fueling needs. Central Government establishments like the Coconut Development Board, the Coir Board and the Marine Products Export Development Authority (MPEDA) have head offices located in the city.

Kalamassery which is situated around 16.5 km from the City Center is one of the major Industrial areas. Leading factories like FACT, HMT and IT/Biotechnology park like KINFRA Hi-Tech Park are located here. The Cochin University of Science and Technology is located at Kalamassery. Irimpanam is another major industrial area in Kochi. The Seaport-Airport Road (SPAP Road) passes through this place and oil giants like Indian Oil Corporation, Bharat Petroleum and Hindustan Petroleum have plants here.

Like elsewhere in Kerala, tourism is one of the major contributors of the local economy. Ernakulam district, in which Kochi is situated, ranks first in the total number of domestic tourists visiting Kerala, and thus contributes to the economy of the city. The tourist enclave at Fort Kochi and presence of several historical monuments, museums etc. as well as natural attractions like the Vembanad lake and the backwaters attract large number of tourists to the city. Presence of several leading hospitality brands have been a major source of employment for locals. The Kochi Port is one of the leading ports where international cruisers call on regularly. The city has the first marina facility in the country, Kochi Marina which attracts large number of yacht-totters. Real Estate industry is also one industry which is contributing a lot to the economy of Kochi. Many players have entered the market and have developed residential properties. Kochi is the headquarters of the Southern Naval Command, the primary training centre of the Indian Navy. The Cochin Shipyard, contributes to the economy of the city. The fishing harbour at Thoppumpady is a minor fishing port in the state and supplies fish to local and export markets. To further tap the potential of the all-season harbour at Kochi, an international cruise terminal was also constructed.

Exports and allied activities are also important contributors to the city's economy. The Cochin Port currently handles export and import of container cargo at its terminal at Willingdon Island. The International Container Transshipment Terminal operating out of Vallarpadam, is India's largest transshipment terminal. Cochin Port Trust also planning to build an Outer Harbour near Puthuvype. Kochi's historical reliance on trade continues into modern times, as the city is a major exporter of spices and is home to the International Pepper Exchange, where black pepper is globally traded. The Spices Board of India and World Spice Organisation are headquartered in Kochi.

The IT and ITES related industries are growing up in Kochi. Availability of cheap bandwidth through undersea cables and lower operational costs compared to other major cities in India, has been to its advantage. Various technology and industrial campuses including the government promoted InfoPark, Cochin Special Economic Zone and KINFRA Export Promotion Industrial Park operate in the outskirts of the city. Several new industrial campuses are under construction in the suburbs of the city. SmartCity at Kakkanad is one of the prominent projects. Cyber City at Kalamassery is another integrated IT township SEZ being planned in the private sector.

== Transport ==
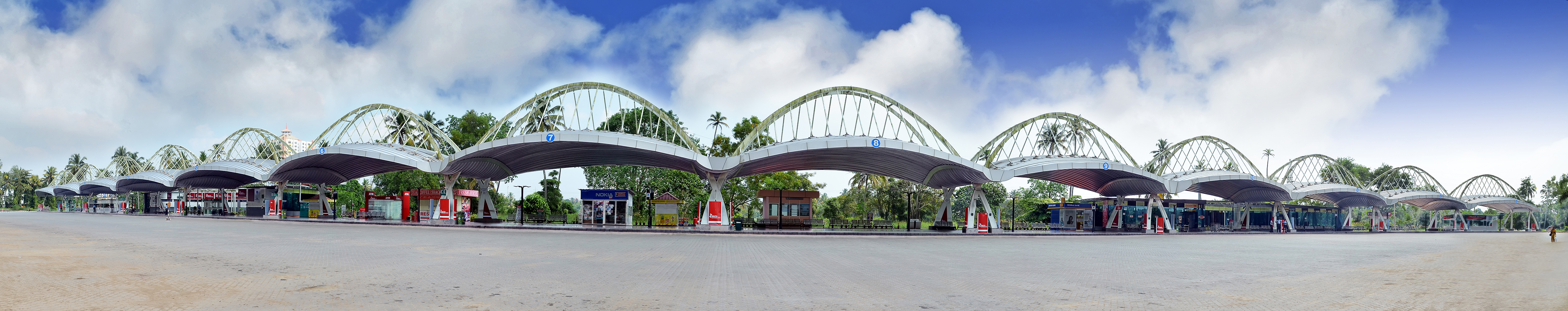
A panoramic view of Vyttila Mobility Hub

=== Air ===
The air gateway to Kochi is the Cochin International Airport (CIAL) located at Nedumbassery, which is about 28 km (17 mi) north of Kochi city, and handles both domestic and international flights. It is the first international airport in India to be built without Central Government funds. The airport received the United Nations Champions of the Earth award in 2018 for its entrepreneurial vision in sustainable energy use. Cochin International Airport became the world's first fully solar-powered airport in 2015.

The Cochin airport provides direct connectivity to popular international destinations in the Middle East, Malaysia, Thailand and Singapore and to most major Indian cities apart from tourist destinations like Lakshadweep. With a terminal area of 840,000 sq ft (78,000 m^{2}), and a passenger capacity of 2200 (international and domestic), it is the largest and busiest airport in the state. It is also the fifth busiest airport in India in terms of international passenger traffic, and seventh busiest overall.

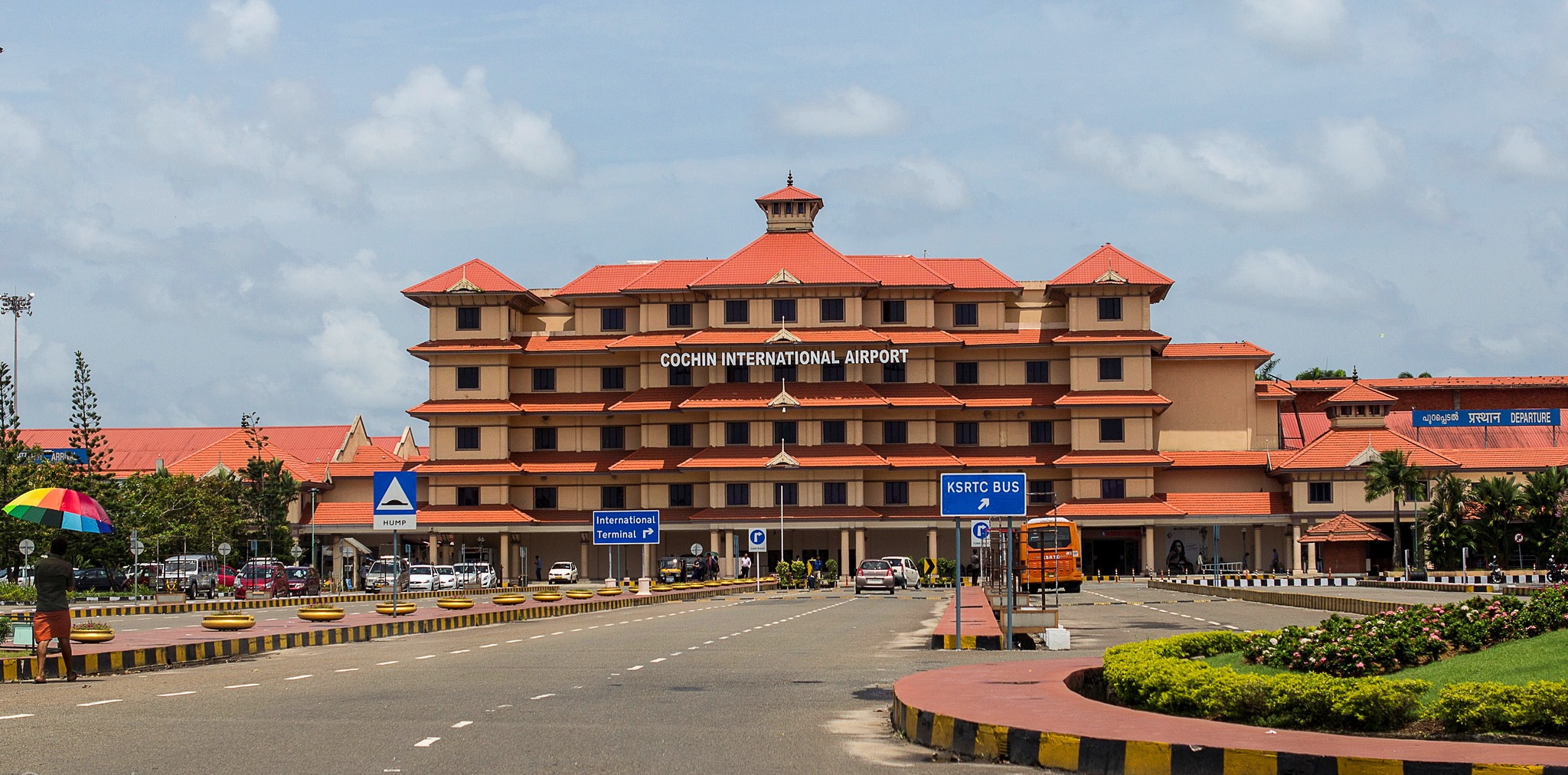
The Cochin International Airport is one of the busiest airports in the country and the first fully solar powered airport in the world

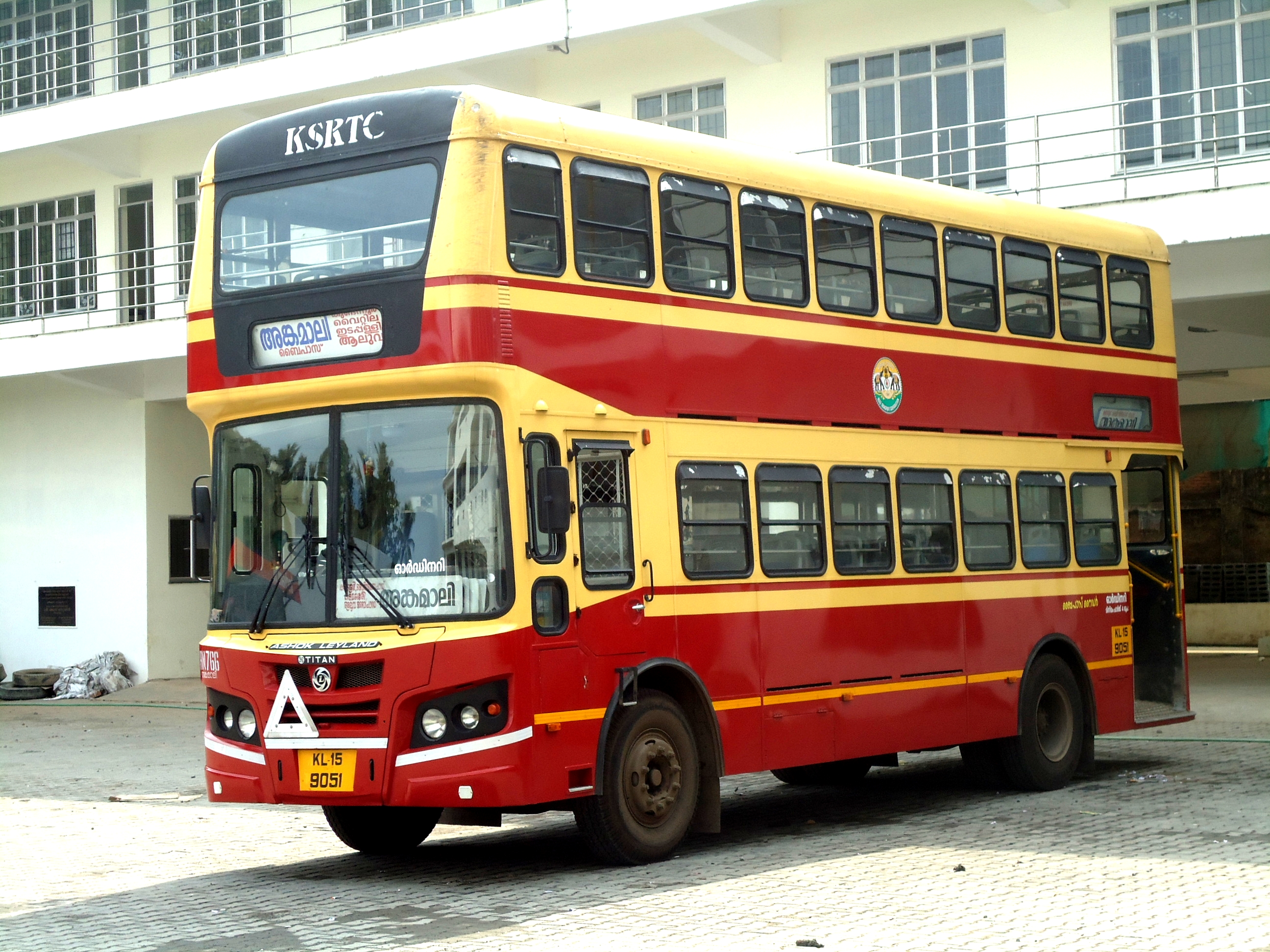
A KSRTC Double-decker bus on service in the city

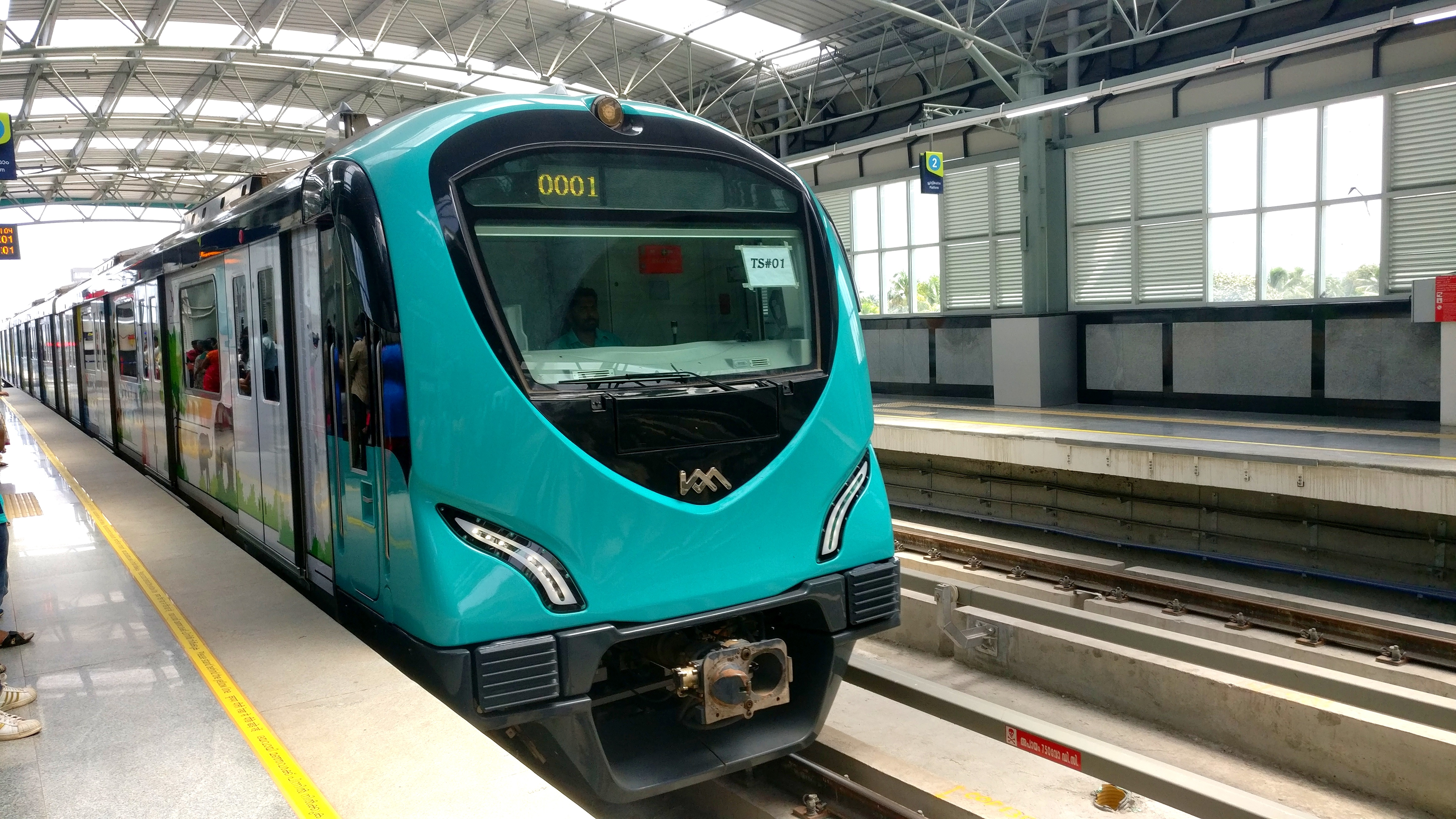
Kochi Metro is the fastest completed metro project in India

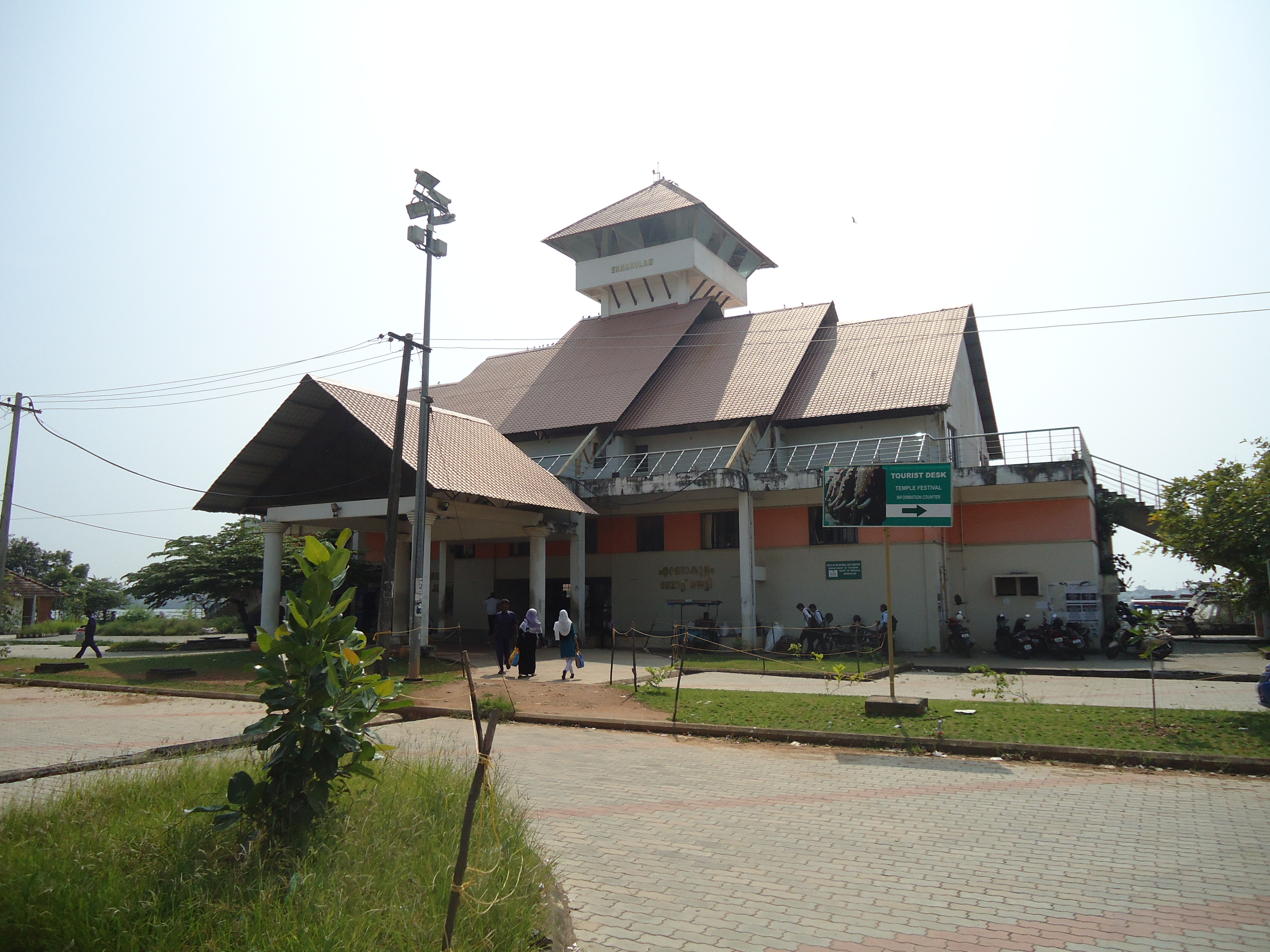
Ernakulam Boat Jetty is one of the main boat jetties in the city

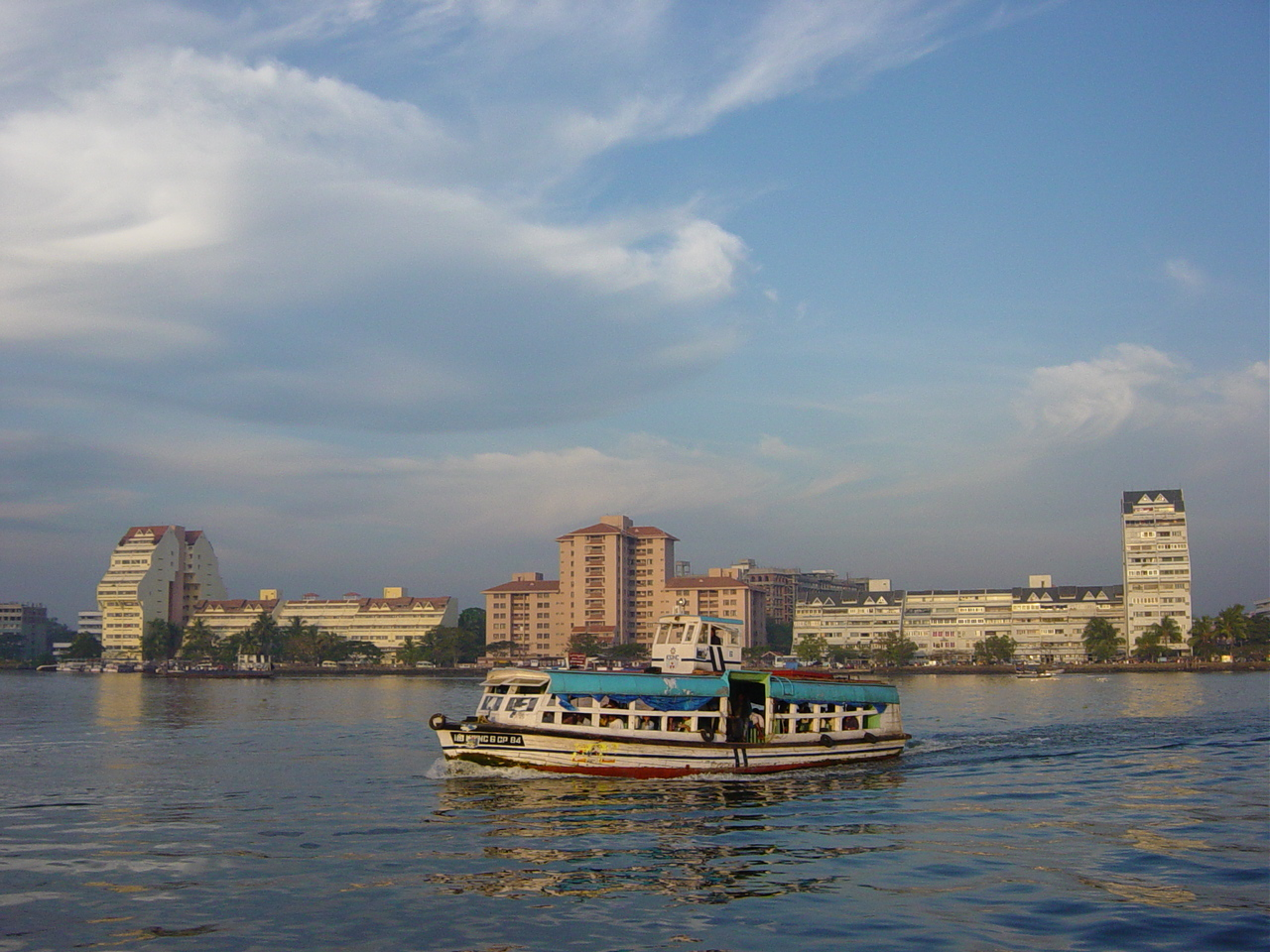
Ferry Service boat at Kochi backwaters

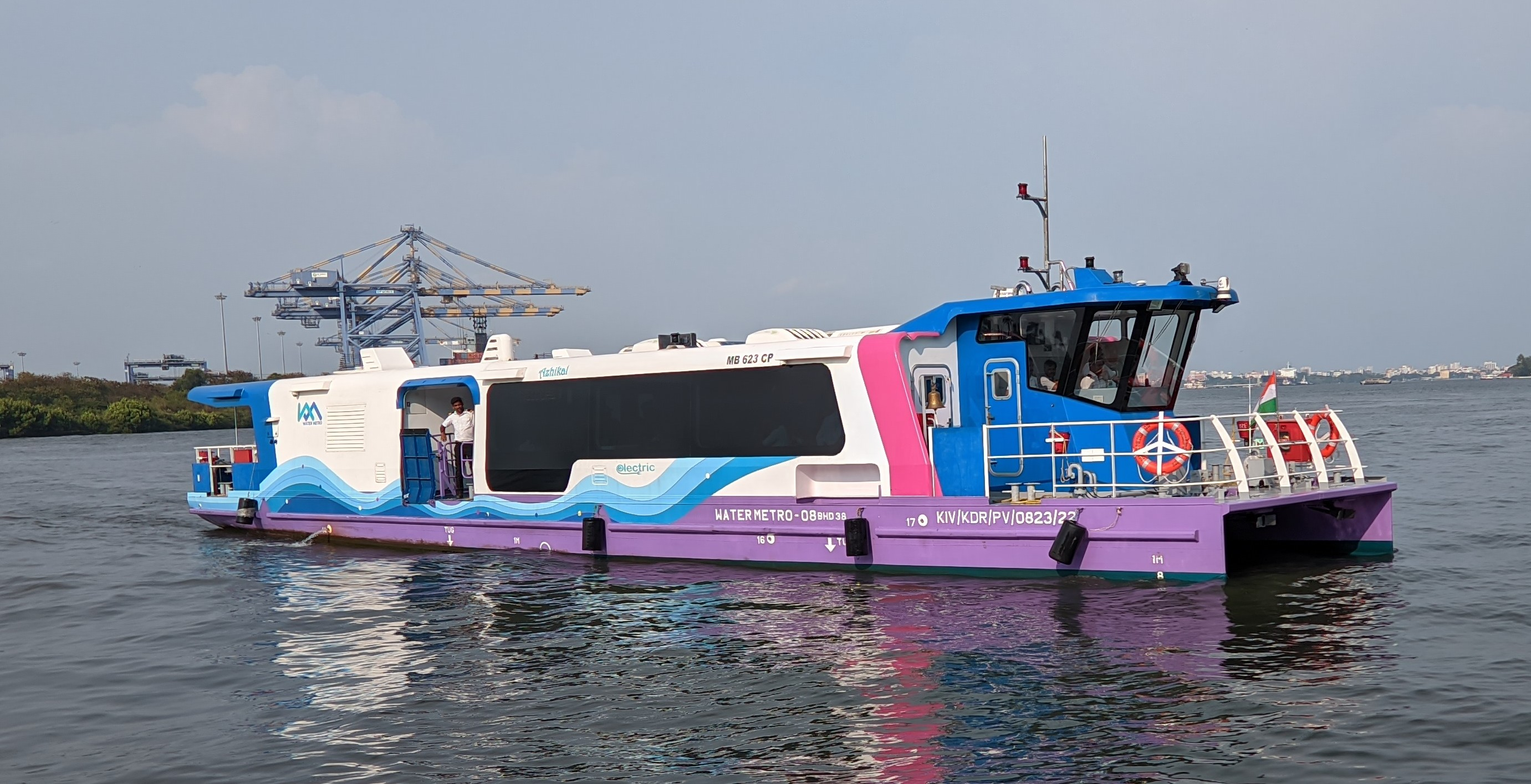
Kochi Water Metro operates a ferry system for the city

=== Road ===
Kochi is well connected to neighbouring cities and states via several highways. It is a node in the North-South Corridor of the National Highway system. The road infrastructure in Kochi has not been able to meet the growing traffic demand and hence traffic congestion is a major problem in the city.

Kochi is served by National Highway 66, National Highway 544, National Highway 966A and National Highway 966B.

Several state highways also connect Kochi with other parts of Kerala. SH 15, Ettumanoor-Ernakulam Road, connects the city to Kottayam, Pala, Kumily, Changanacherry, Pathanamthitta etc. SH 41, Palarivattom-Thekkady Road, provides a corridor to the eastern parts of the district. SH 63, Vypeen Pallipuram Road and SH 66, Alappuzha – Thoppumpady road are coastal roads that serve the narrow sliver of land between the backwaters and the sea.

The main arterial roads of the city are the Mahatma Gandhi Road and Sahodaran Ayyappan Road in Ernakulam, constructed in 1925 & 1962 respectively which runs parallel & perpendicular to the coast and having the proposed Metro Rail connectivity. The Seaport-Airport Road is another major road and connects the Cochin Seaport to the Cochin International Airport. The Infopark Expressway in Kakkanad is connected to the Seaport-Airport Road and stretches all the way to Infopark. Other major roads include Chittoor Road, Banerji Road, Shanmugham Road, Kochi Bypass, Kaloor-Kadavanthra Road, Park Avenue etc. A new ring road is proposed for Kochi city by the state government for which a project study is being currently undertaken by NATPAC.

=== Public transport ===
==== Road ====
The primary form of public transport within the city is largely dependent on privately owned bus networks. The state-run also operates its services in the city through the Thirukochi service. The major bus terminals in the city are Ernakulam Town, Ernakulam Jetty and the private bus terminal at Kaloor. An integrated transit terminal namely The Mobility Hub at Vytilla is under second phase of construction. The terminal acts as a hub for long-distance bus services away from the city centre, and also a converging point for different modes of public transport, namely bus, metro and ferry.

Kochi is one of the few cities to be granted the new-generation air-conditioned low-floor and non-air-conditioned semi-low-floor buses under the JNNURM city transport development project. KSRTC and private buses operate frequent schedules to neighbouring areas of Nedumbassery, Perumbavoor, Aluva, Muvattupuzha, Kothamangalam, Cherthala and Poochakkal. Taxis and auto rickshaws (called autos) are available for hire throughout the day.

Development of road infrastructure not keeping pace with the increase in traffic is a major problem faced by Kochi, like most other parts of Kerala.

==== Rail ====
The city has four major railway stations – Ernakulam Junction, Ernakulam Town (locally known as the South and North railway stations respectively), Aluva, and Tripunithura followed by smaller stations, Edapally and Kalamassery. There is also the Cochin Harbour Terminus providing rail connectivity to the southern segment of the Port of Kochi. The terminus is currently under renovation for the suburban rail networks in the city. The main rail transport system in Kochi is operated by the Southern Railway Zone of Indian Railways, and comes under Thiruvananthapuram Railway division. The South station is one of the busiest railway stations in South India, with more than 128 scheduled train services daily. The North station situated on the northern side of the city, caters mostly to long-distance services that bypass the South station, and also is an additional halt station for many trains.

There is also a historic station named as Ernakulam Terminus (station code:ERG) situated behind the High Court. Great personalities like Mahatma Gandhi and The British Viceroy have visited Cochin through this old railway station. Ernakulam Terminus was the first station to serve the city but had to be abandoned in the early 1960s. Now this station operates as a goods depot of Southern Railway.

==== Metro ====
The Kochi Metro is a metro rapid transit system serving the city of Kochi, intended to considerably ease traffic congestion in the city and its surrounding metropolitan area. It is being constructed in three phases. The construction work of the first phase began in June 2013. The 13.4 km (8.3 mi) section of the line from Aluva to Palarivattom consisting of 11 stations was opened to passengers on 17 June 2017 by Narendra Modi, the Prime Minister of India. The first phase spanning 28.125 km (17.476 mi) from Aluva to Thrippunithura with 25 stations was completed in March 2024 at an estimated cost of ₹51.81 billion (US$540 million). The second phase from JLN Stadium to Infopark-Kakkanad, known as the Pink Line, is expected to be commissioned by 2026.

==== Water ====
Kochi ranks among India's major seaports, partly due to being one of the safest harbours in the Indian Ocean. The port, administered by a statutory autonomous body known as the Cochin Port Trust, offers facilities for bunkering, handling cargo and passenger ships and storage accommodation. The port is a complex of three islands, one of which is man-made.

It also operates passenger ships to Colombo and Lakshadweep. Boat services are operated by Kerala Shipping and Inland Navigation Corporation, the State Water Transport Department and private firms from various boat jetties in the city. The junkar ferry for the transshipment of vehicles and passengers between the islands are operated between Ernakulam and Vypin, and between Vypin and Fort Kochi. However, with the construction of the Goshree bridges (which links Kochi's islands), ferry transport has become less essential. The main boat jetties are Ernakulam Main Boat Jetty near Park Avenue, High Court Jetty in Banerjee Road, Embarkation Jetty in Willingdon Island and Fort Kochi Jetty. In April 2023, Kochi became India's first city to have a water metro project. The Kochi Water Metro is the first water metro project in India and the first integrated water transport system of this size in Asia connects 10 islands of Kochi through a network of 15 routes that span 76 km and 38 jetties.

== Demographics ==
Religions in Kochi City (2011)
Religion	Percent
Hinduism	43.78%
Christianity	38.12%
Islam	17.56%
Others	0.54%

Kochi has the highest population density in Kerala with 7139 people per km^{2}.

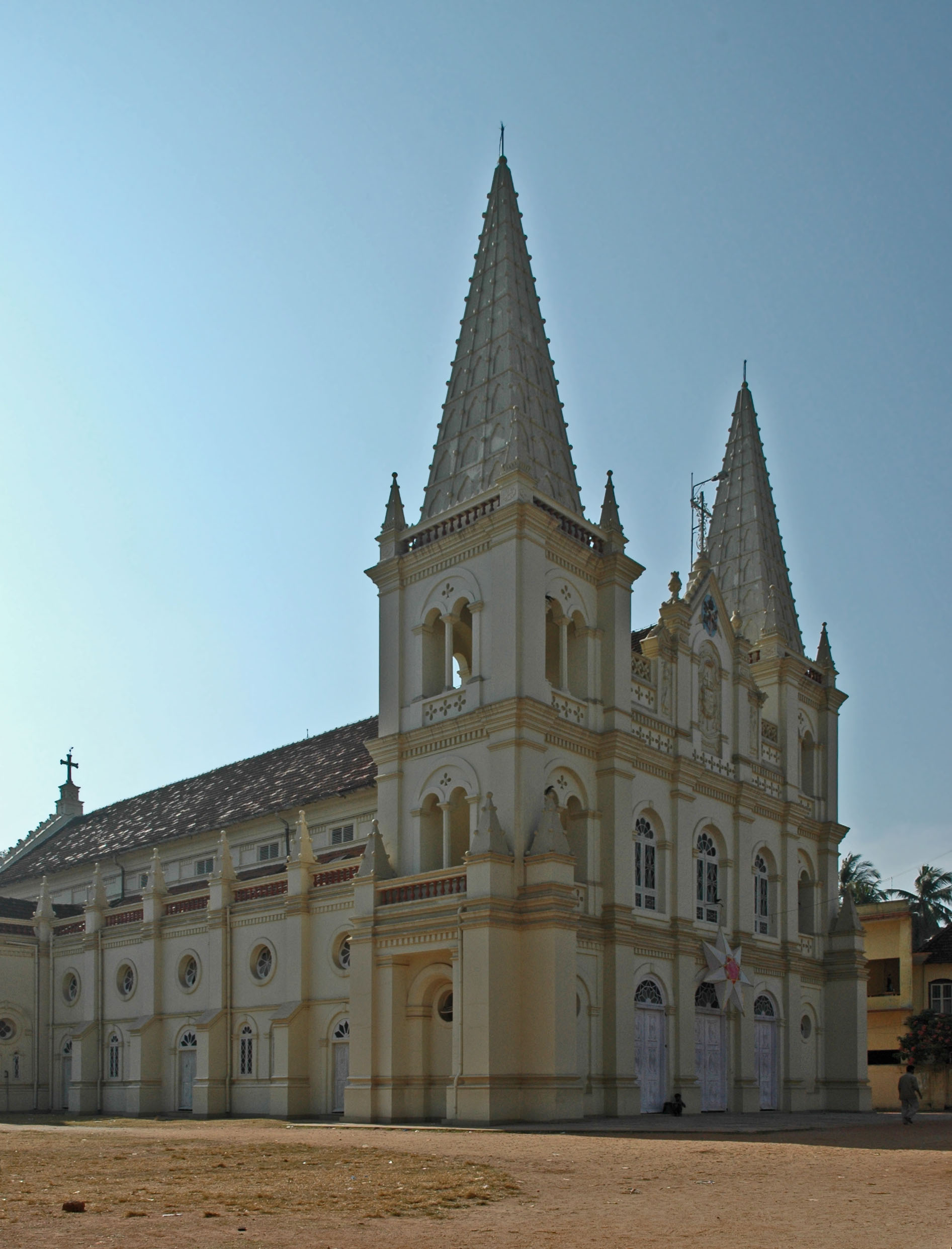
The Santa Cruz Basilica at Fort Kochi is one of the thirty five Basilicas in India

As of 2011, Kochi had a metropolitan area population of 2,117,990. The female-to-male ratio is 1,028:1,000, significantly higher than the all-India average of 933:1,000. Kochi's literacy rate is 97.5%. The female literacy rate lags that of males by 1.1%, among the lowest such gaps in India.

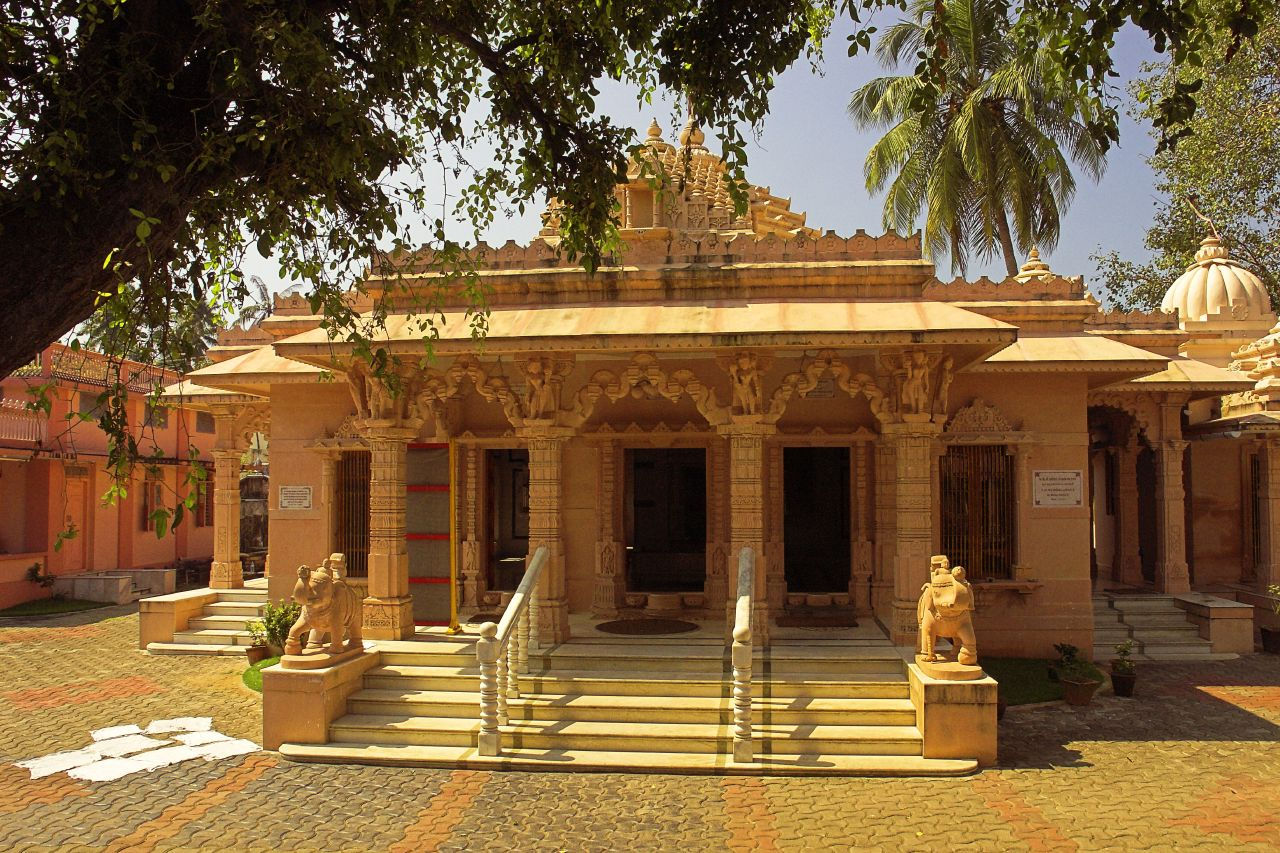
Dharmanath Jain Temple at Mattancherry

Kochi's major religions are Hinduism, Christianity and Islam. Jainism, Judaism, Sikhism and Buddhism. Though 44% practice Hinduism, Christianity's large following (38%) makes Kochi a city with one of the largest Christian populations in India. The majority of the city's residents are Malayalis. However, there are significant ethnic minority communities including Tamils, Gujaratis, Jews, Anglo-Indians, Sikhs and Konkanis. Malayalam is the main language of communication and medium of instruction for primary education, although a number of schools do offer English medium education. English is the preferred language in higher education and business circles. Tamil and Hindi are widely understood—albeit rarely spoken.

Like other fast-growing cities in the developing world, Kochi suffers from major urbanisation problems. The city was ranked tenth among Indian cities in terms of house-cost and availability, urban household crowding and household incomes.

According to the National Crime Records Bureau, the city holds the fourth position in the number of recorded crimes in India. In 2009, the city recorded an average crime rate of 646.3 against the national average of 181.4. But Kochi City Police Commissioner later clarified that this anomaly was due to higher reporting rates of minor crimes in Kochi than in other Indian cities. The State Crime Records Bureau (SCRB) report gives further credence to this as it finds that Kochi has the fewest crime against women in the state of Kerala. According to the 2011 Institute of Competitiveness report on Liveability, Kochi stands first in the state, and sixth in the country. Kochi is ranked seventh in the list of the top ten most affluent cities in India by a 2009 Nielsen Company study. Kochi was ranked the fourth cleanest city in India in the Swachch Bharat rankings for cities. It was selected as one of the hundred Indian cities to be developed as a smart city under Prime Minister Narendra Modi flagship Smart Cities Mission.

== Culture ==
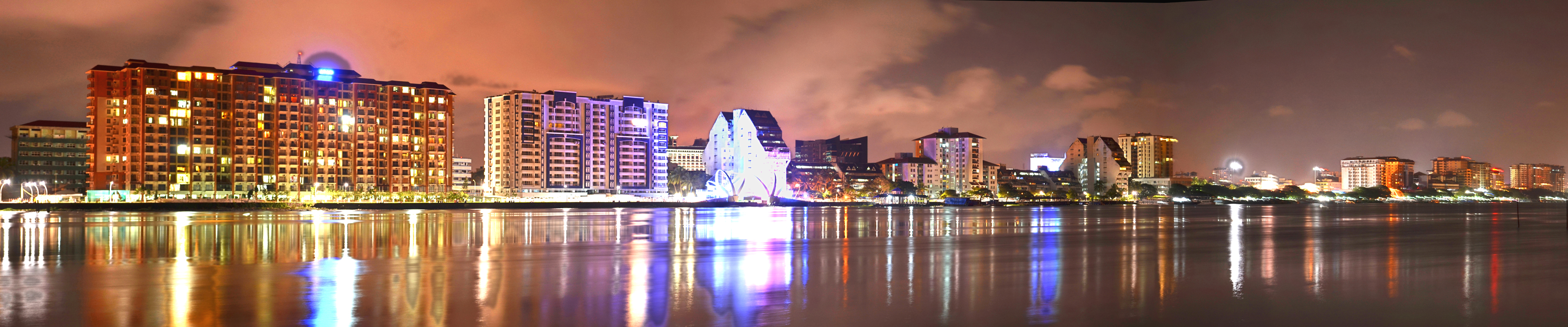
Marine Drive, Kochi

As a result of successive waves of migration over the course of several centuries, the population of the city is a mix of people from all parts of Kerala and most of India. The pan-Indian nature is highlighted by the substantial presence of various ethnic communities from different parts of the country.

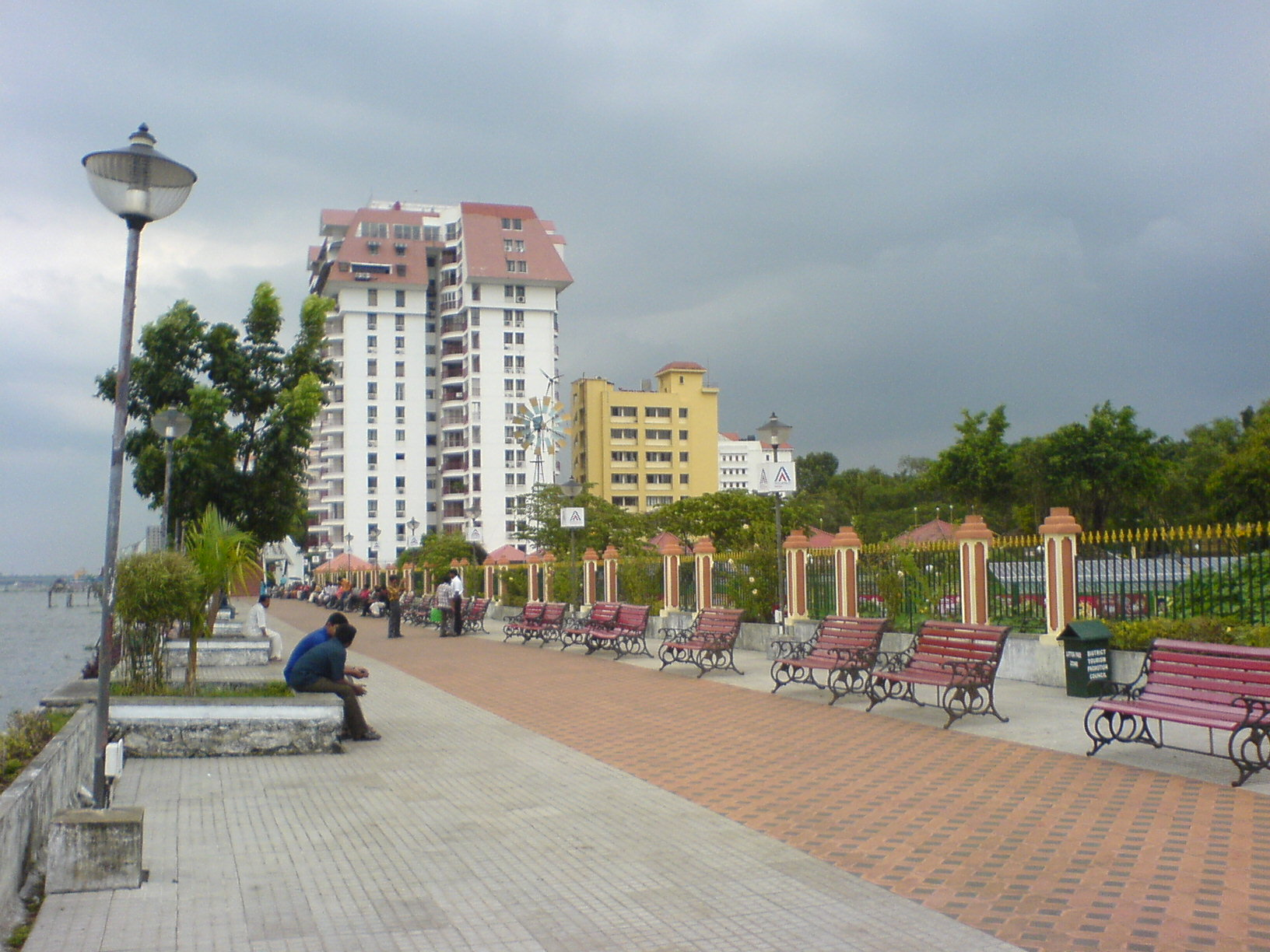
Pedestrians can stroll along the Marine Drive, a waterfront promenade of Kochi

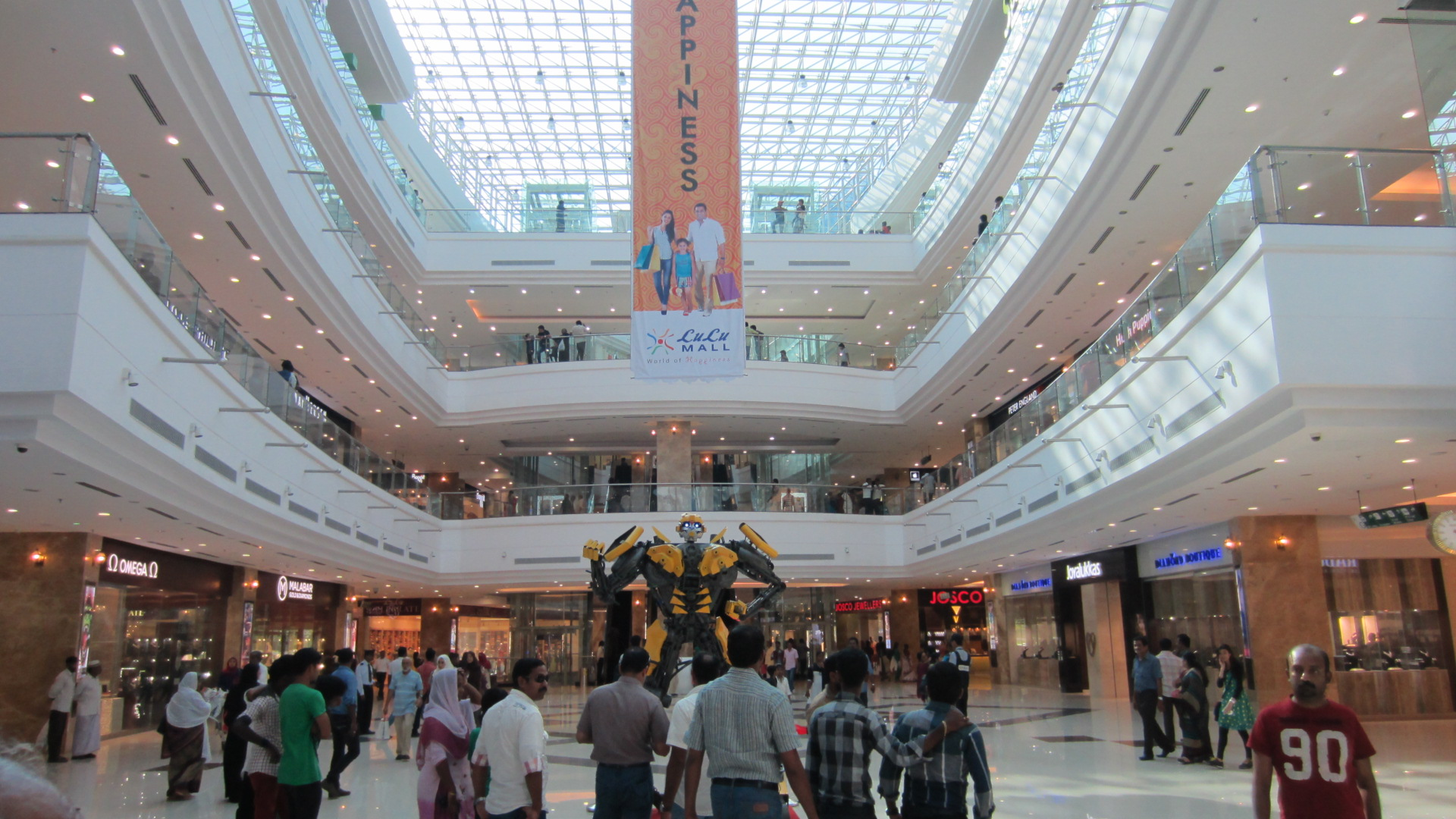
LuLu Mall is one of the largest shopping malls in India

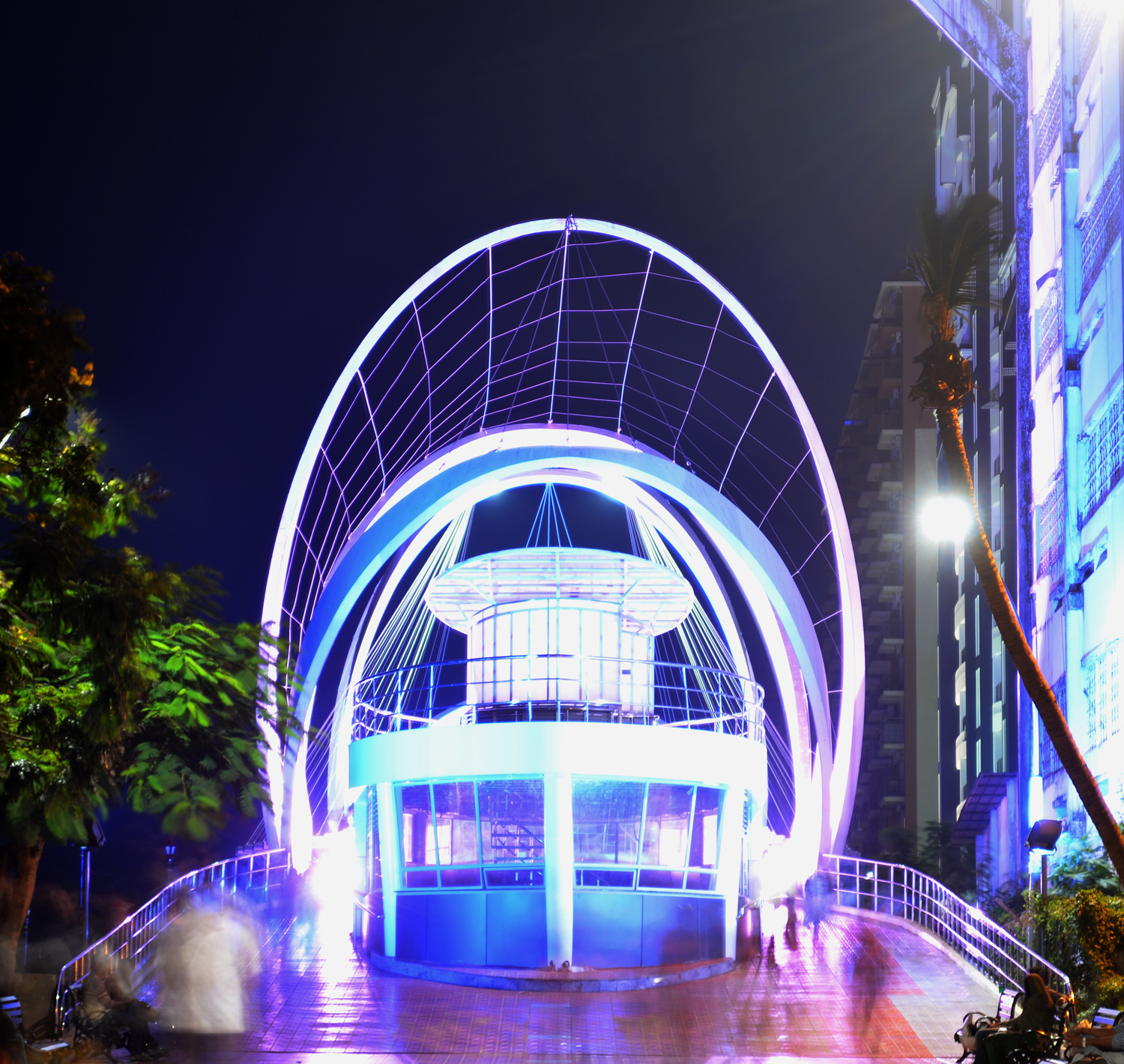
The Kettuvallom Bridge at Marine Drive

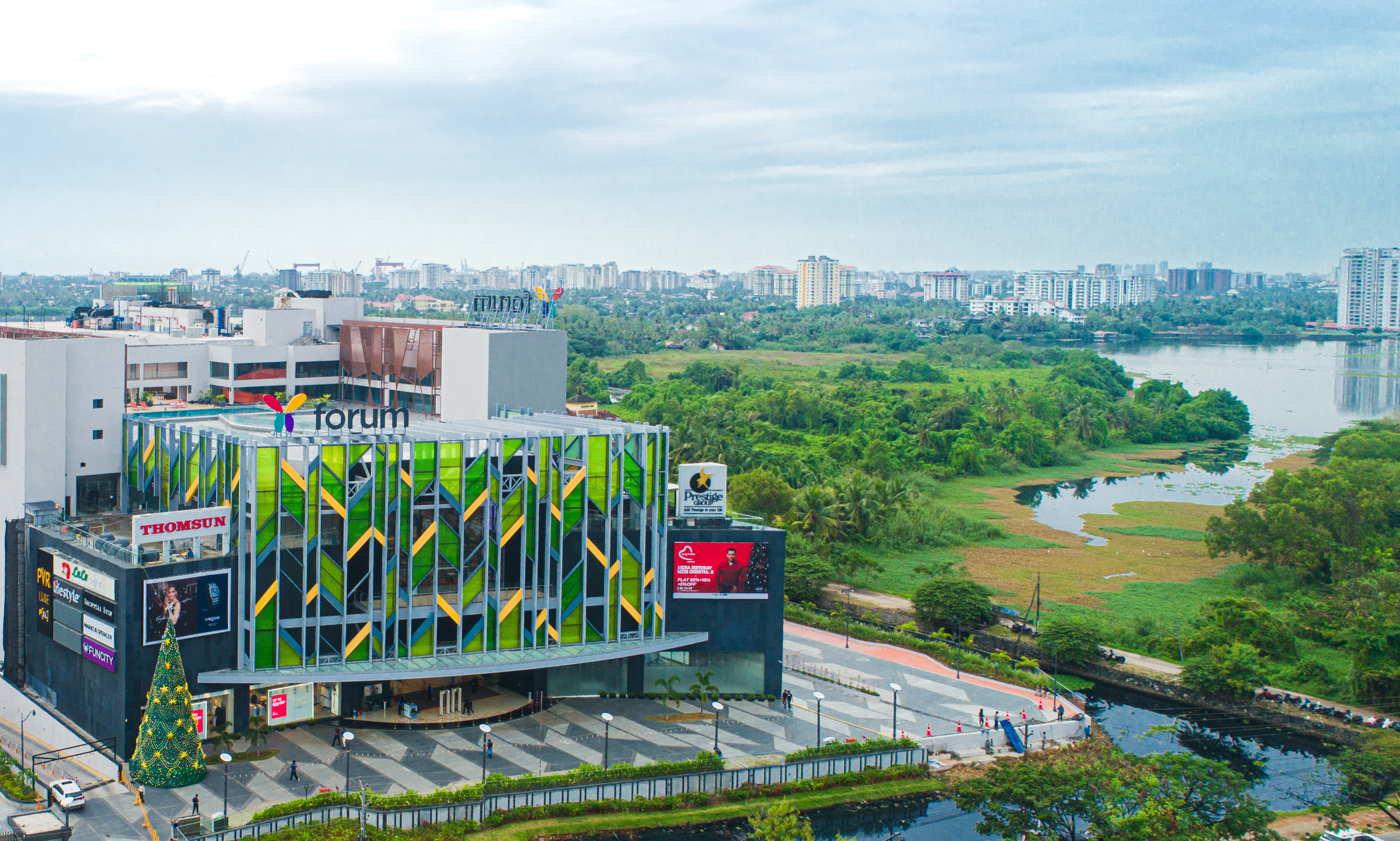
Forum Mall, Kochi

|200px]]
A bird's eye view of Forum Mall Kochi

Kochi has a diverse, multicultural and secular community consisting of Malayalis, Konkanis, Gujaratis, Bengalis, Marathis, Punjabis, Tamilians, Kannadigas, Biharis, Anglo Indians and a few families of Jews among other denominations. The city once had a large Jewish community, known as the Malabar Yehuden—and now increasingly as Cochin Jews—who figured prominently in Kochi's business and economic strata and owned several Synagogues across Kochi and nearby areas such as Chendamangalam, Paravur or Mala.

Kochi was one among the seven diocese of Syrian Orthodox (Jacobite Syrian Christian Church) in Kerala formed in 1876. The seat of the Bishop is at St George Cathedral, Karingachira. Also at Mary's Cathedral Elamkulam, seat of bishop of Simhasana churches of Jacobites is in the city. The seat of the Roman Catholic Cathedral of Kerala's Archdiocese of Verapoly and the Diocese of Cochin are located in the city. The Syro-Malabar Church, one of the 22 sui iuris Eastern Catholic Churches and a part of the Saint Thomas Christian community, has its seat at Ernakulam. Prominent places of Christian worship include the St. Mary's Syro-Malabar Catholic Cathedral Basilica, Ernakulam, St. Francis Assisi Roman Catholic Cathedral, Ernakulam, Basilica of Our Lady of Ransom, Vallarpadam-Ernakulam, Santa Cruz Basilica Roman Catholic Cathedral, Fort Kochi, St. Antony's Shrine at Kaloor, St. George Forane Church, Edappally and appropriate top its multi-ethnic composition, Kochi celebrates traditional Kerala festivals like Onam and Vishu along with North Indian Hindu festivals like Holi. Christian and Islamic festivals like Christmas, Easter, Eid ul-Fitr and Mawlid are also celebrated. A merry making fest called the Cochin Carnival is celebrated at Fort Kochi during the last ten days of December.

Kochi houses wide range of shopping malls including Forum Mall, Oberon Mall, Centre Square Mall and LuLu Mall, which is one of the largest shopping malls in India in terms of total leasable area at 17 acres (7 ha). Kochi also has the most number of five star hotels in the state. These include international hotel brands like Crowne Plaza, Marriott International, Grand Hyatt, Sheraton, Le Méridien, Radisson Blu, Holiday Inn, Ramada, Ibis, and Taj Malabar among the others.

Kochi was home to some of the most influential figures in Malayalam literature, including Changampuzha Krishna Pillai, Kesari Balakrishna Pillai, G. Sankara Kurup, and Vyloppilli Sreedhara Menon. Prominent social reformers such as Sahodaran Ayyappan and Pandit Karuppan also are from Kochi. The Kochi International Book Festival is an annual book festival conducted since 2000.

== Healthcare ==
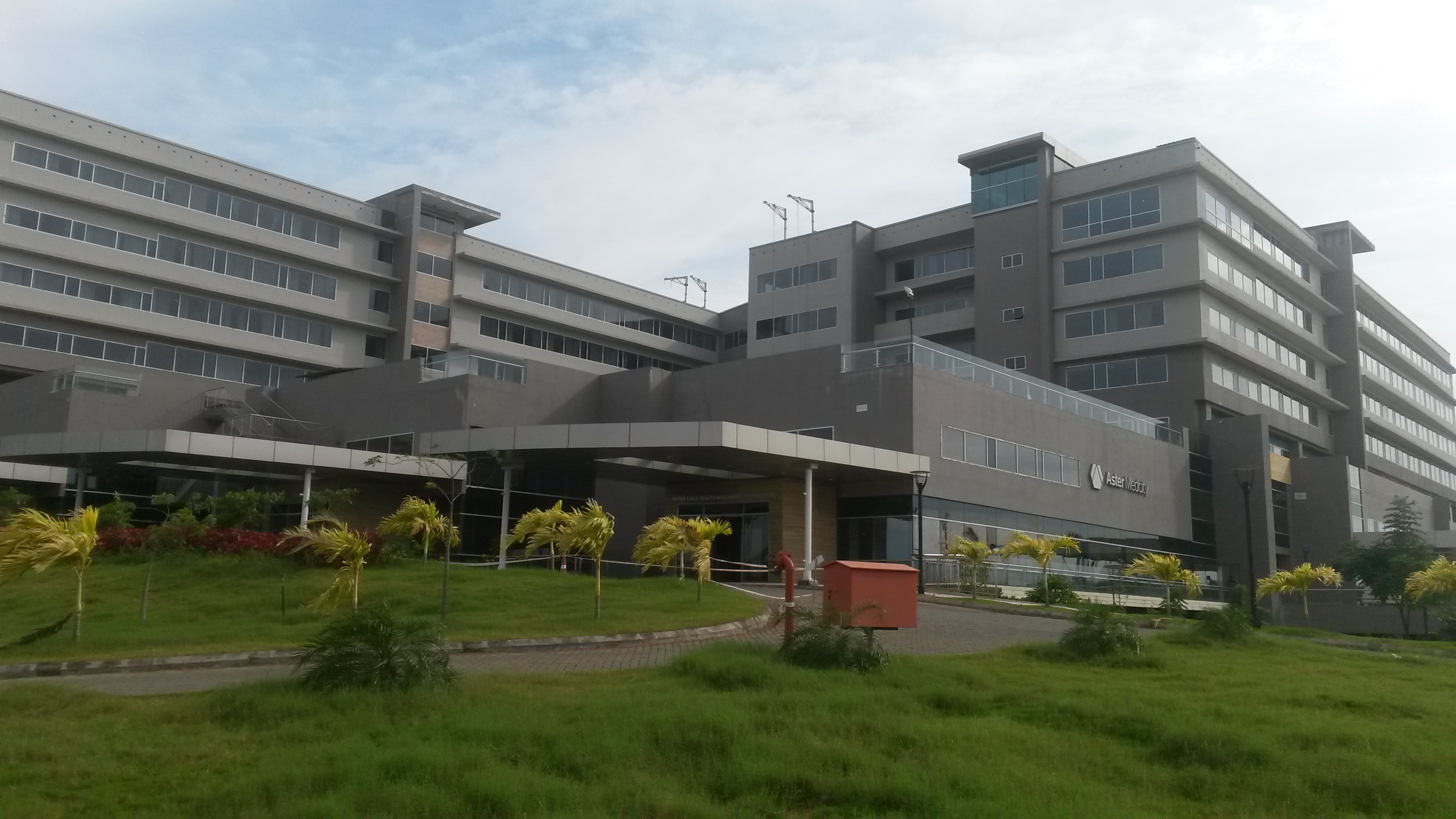
Aster Medcity is one of the largest hospitals in the country

With many advanced tertiary/quaternary care facilities, Kochi has one of the best healthcare facilities in India. It is the prime destination for people seeking advanced healthcare facilities from across Kerala.

In recent times, it has attracted many patients from India, the Middle East, Africa, Europe and the United States looking for relatively inexpensive advanced medical care. Kochi is the only city from Kerala that has carried out successful heart transplantations. Amrita Institute of Medical Sciences and Research Centre, Sunrise Hospital, Specialist Hospital, Medical Trust Hospital, PVS Memorial Hospital, Renai medicity, Lakeshore Hospital, Lisie Hospital, Aster Medcity, Rajagiri Institute of Medical Sciences is one advanced tertiary/quaternary healthcare facility in Kochi. Other reputed institutions in the city include Ernakulam Medical Centre, KIMS Hospital, Gautham Hospital, Lourdes Hospital and Saraf Hospital. Some of the reputed fertility related treatment centres in India – like Vijaya Hospital, Bourn Hall Clinic and CIMAR – are located in Kochi. General Hospital, Ernakulam and Government Medical College, Ernakulam are notable medical institutions in the government sector in Kochi.

In August 2019, Arike, a home daycare program in the district, was started for extending the services of home palliative care. Nurses who have undergone training in palliative care reach out to patients at their homes. The service is available to those who have registered with the General Hospital's home palliative care programme.

== Education ==
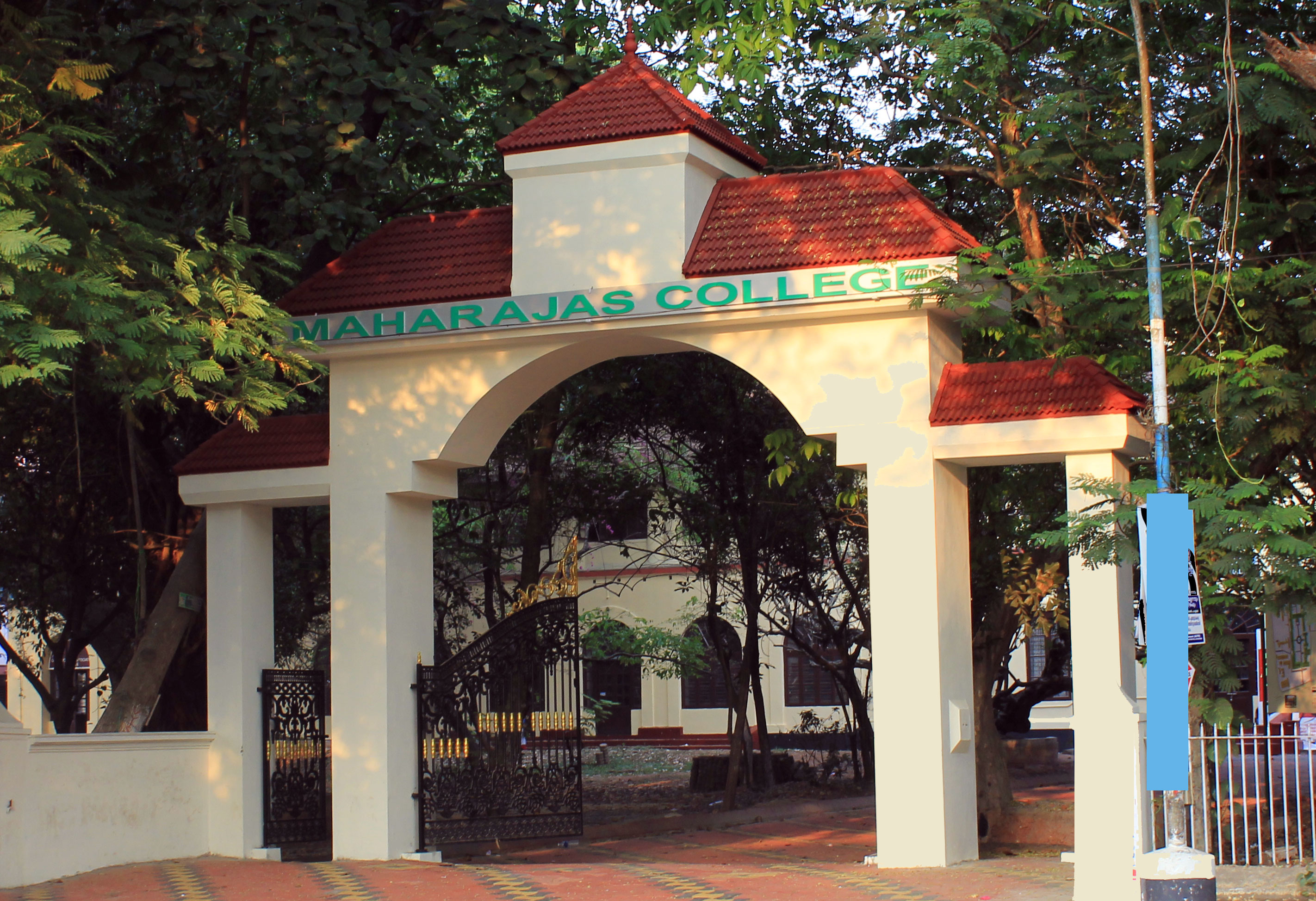
Established in 1875, the Maharaja's College is one of the oldest colleges in the state

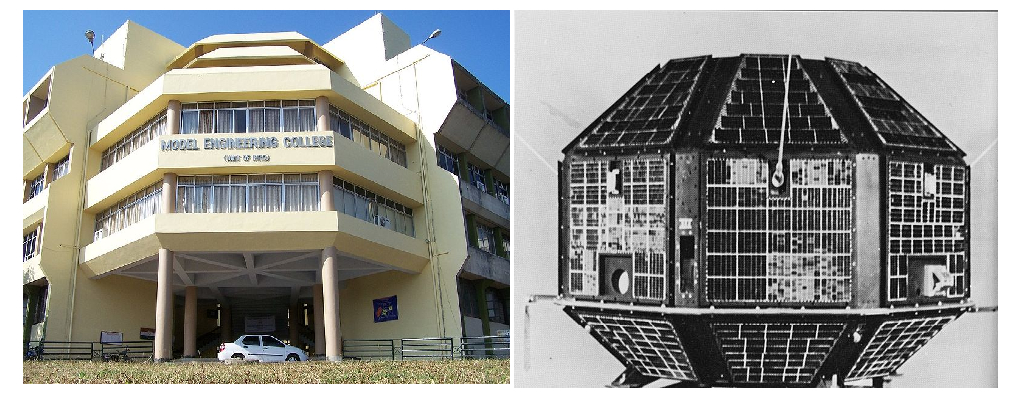
The main building of Model Engineering College was inspired from India's first satellite, Aryabhatta

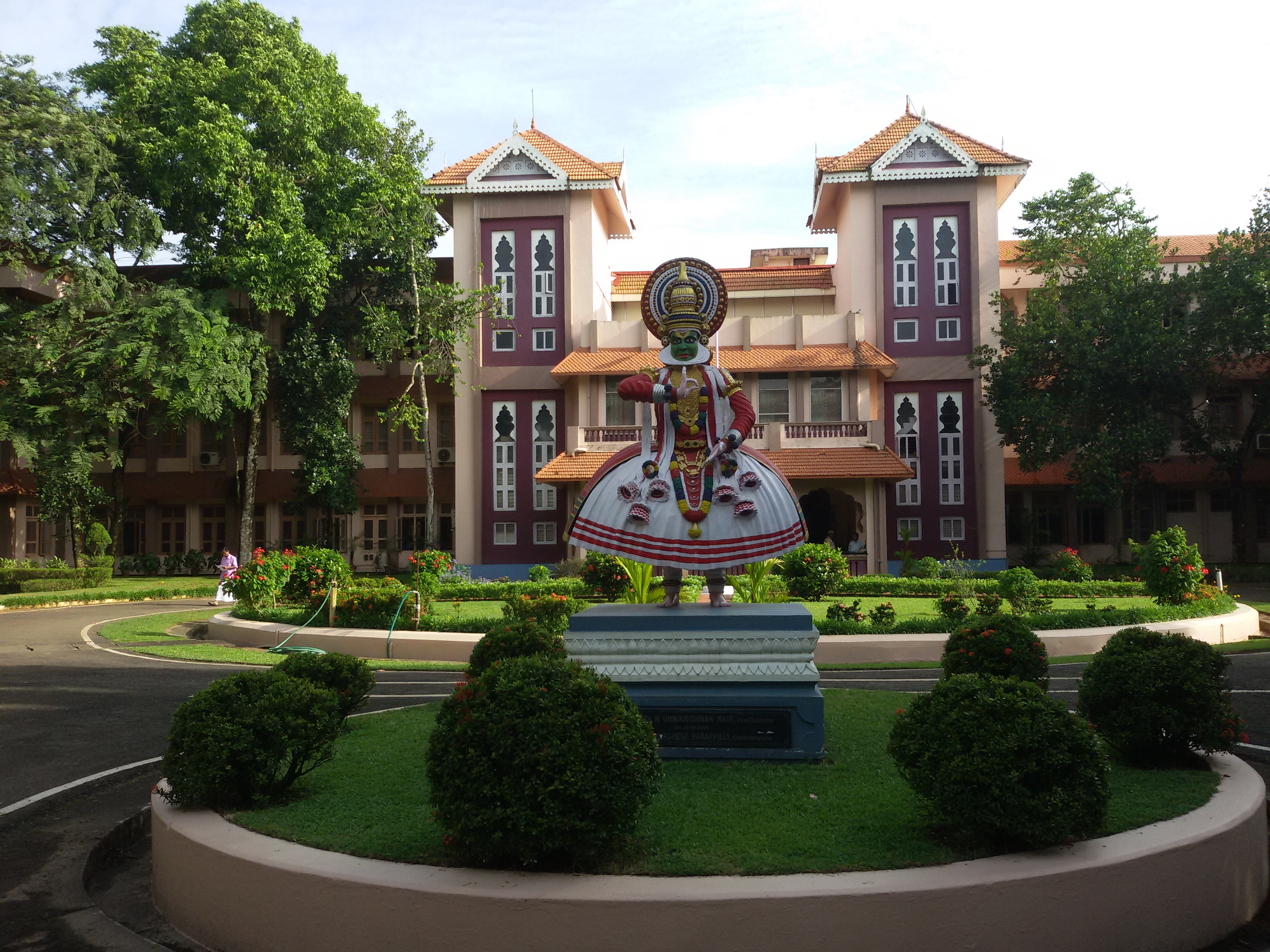
The Cochin University of Science and Technology is one of the top educational institutions in the country

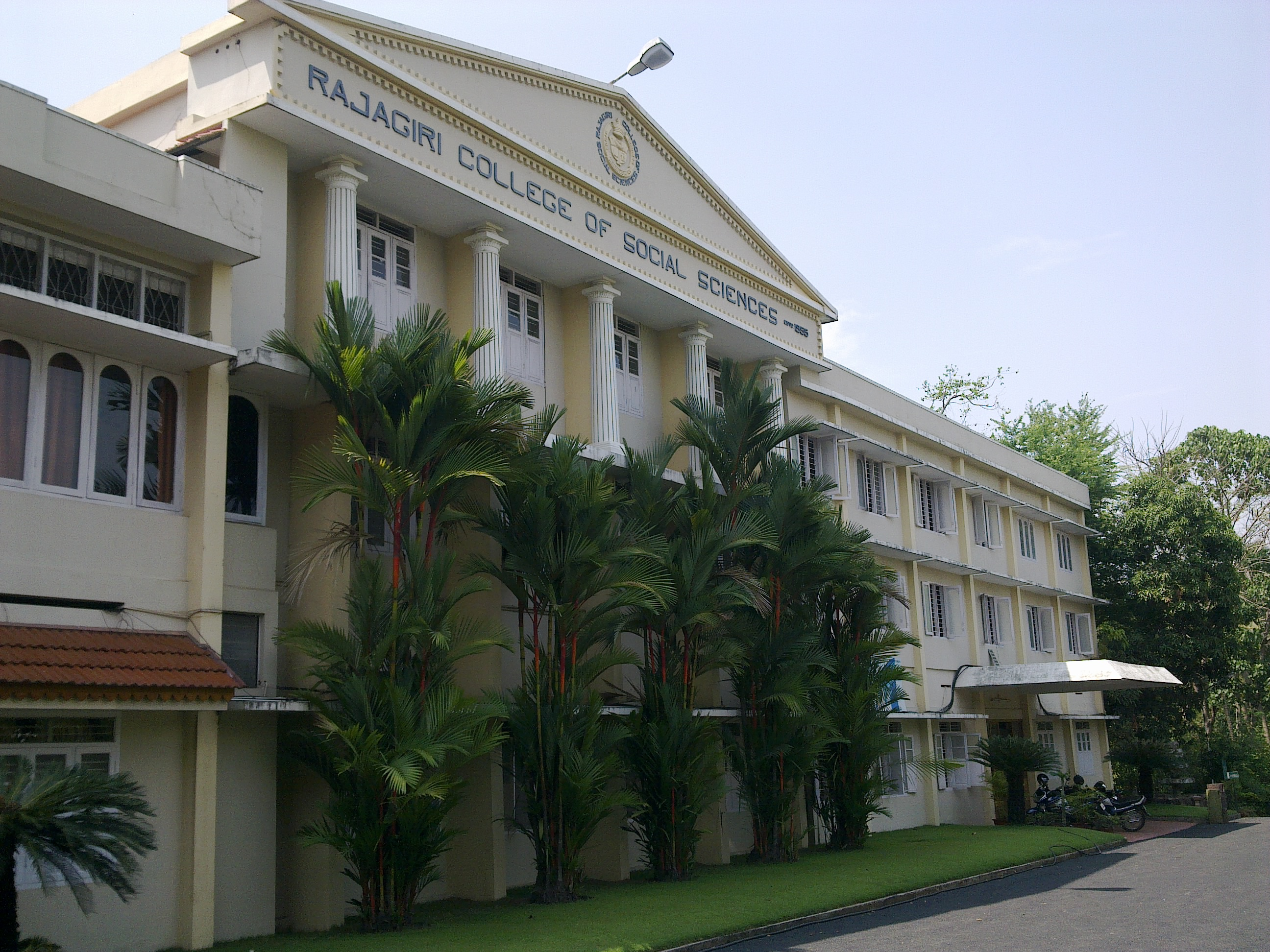
Rajagiri College of Social Sciences at Kalamassery

=== Secondary education ===
The pattern of primary education is essentially the same all over the state. There are government owned schools and government aided schools, which are affiliated to the Kerala State Education Board. Most of the schools owned by private organisations or individuals are affiliated to the Central Board for Secondary Education (CBSE). Indian Certificate of Secondary Education (ICSE) have some schools affiliated to them as well. The state education board offers both Malayalam and English medium instruction, while the other boards offer English medium alone. There are a few schools that follow international curricula, such as IB and IGCSE.

There 34 government schools, 67 private aided schools and 31 unaided schools affiliated to the Kerala State Education Board in the city and suburbs. There are 62 CBSE Schools, 2 IGCSE and 9 ICSE Schools as well.

Notable schools in the government sector are Sree Rama Varma High School, Edappally High School, Government School-Kochi and Govt Girls Higher Secondary School, Ernakulam. Kendriya Vidyalaya, Chinmaya Mission and Bharatiya Vidya Bhavan run several quasi-private charter schools within the city limits, as well as in the suburbs. There are several private schools (both aided & unaided) that are owned by secular and religious trusts which are of particular renown, such as: St. Albert's HSS, Ernakulam, St. Teresa's CGHSS, St. Mary's CGHSS Ernakulam, St. Antony's CGHSS, Model Technical Higher Secondary School, Kaloor The Delta Study, Rajagiri Public School, Campion School, Assisi Vidyaniketan, Cochin Refineries School, Gregorian Public School, Greets Public School, Toc-H Public School, Navy Children School, Global Public School, Choice School, Vidyodaya School, Mar Thoma Public School, Nava Nirman Public School and St. Pauls International School, Kalamassery, The Charter School Kochi.

=== Higher education ===
The Cochin University of Science and Technology (CUSAT) is a major university named after the city. Most of the colleges in Kochi offering tertiary education are affiliated either with the Mahatma Gandhi University or with A. P. J. Abdul Kalam Technological University, Thiruvananthapuram. Kochi has one of the campuses of the Indian Maritime University at Willingdon Island. Sree Sankaracharya University of Sanskrit in Kalady is a research-oriented university located at the outskirts. Other national educational institutes include the Central Institute of Fisheries Nautical and Engineering Training, the National University of Advanced Legal Studies, the National Institute of Oceanography and the Central Marine Fisheries Research Institute.

Kochi has some of the leading B-Schools in the region. The Indian Institute of Management Kozhikode (IIMK) has set up its first satellite campus at Athulya building in InfoPark, Kochi. Cochin University's School of Management Studies (SMS) is the first and oldest managerial education institution in South India. SCMS Cochin is one of the emerging B-Schools in the country. Another major B-School XIME is opening a new campus in Kochi. Other leading managerial institutions include Rajagiri Centre for Business Studies, Kochi Business School, Amrita School of Business, Albertian Institute of Management and Toc-H B school.

The city and outskirts are home to four medical schools—Amrita Institute of Medical Sciences and Research Centre at Ponekkara, Cochin Medical College at Kalamassery, Sree Narayana Institute of Medical Sciences, and M.O.S.C. Medical College, Kolenchery. Some of the prestigious general colleges are Maharaja's College, St. Albert's College, St. Teresa's College, Sacred Hearts College, Bharata Matha College, Aquina's College, De Paul Institute of Science & Technology (DIST) and Cochin College. The major Engineering and Technology colleges in the city are School of Engineering CUSAT, SCMS School of Engineering and Technology at Kalamassery, Model Engineering College, Rajagiri School of Engineering & Technology and FISAT (Federal Institute of Science & Technology).

Being the seat of the High Court of Kerala, several top legal education institutes are here. The Government Law College-Ernakulam is one of the oldest law schools in Kerala. The School of Legal Studies (SLS), CUSAT is one of the leading graduate, post-graduate, and research institutes in the country. The National University of Advanced Legal Studies (NUALS) is located in the city, which is a premier law university in India and the only Law college listed in CLAT (Common Law Admission Test) in Kerala.

== Social service organisations ==
Some of the main orphanages and rehabilitation shelters in Cochin City are Palluruthy Relief Settlement in Palluruthy Veli, Don Bosco Sneha Bhavan, Don Bosco Big Boys, Crescent Girls Orphanage, YMCA Boys Home, Bal Bhavan, Valsalya Bhavan.

Palluruthy Relief Settlement is under Kochi Municipal Corporation and managed in association with Peoples Council for Social Justice. There are about 300 inmates, and many of them are mentally ill. The night shelter for women run by Kochi Municipal Corporation near Kerala State Road Transport Corporation bus stand provides free and safe accommodation. Peoples Council for Social Justice was found in 1985 under the patronage of Justice V. R. Krishna Iyer with the aim to work for human rights protection, free legal aid and to strive for social justice.

The orphanages for children under Don Bosco Sneha Bhavan Cochi are Sneha Bhavan Annexe, SnehaBhavan, Valsalya Bhavan, Don Bosco and Bosco Nilayam. The Childline India project in Cochin is taken in collaboration with Don Bosco. Children in distress and in need of help can contact in '1098' (toll free number). Sneha Bhavan Annexe is the first point of contact with children and children can stay as a safe night shelter. Sneha Bhavan is a home for the children from the streets and for those from unhealthy and risky situations. The Valsalya Bhavan centre is solely for the girls who are rescued from the streets. Runaways, street children, children of sex workers, abused children and child labourers all live here. Along with primary and high school education at a local school, the centre provides shelter, food, clothing and educational support.

There are also people doing independent social services within the city. The Italian Sister Fabiola conducts a home at Fort Kochi known as "Ashwasa Bhavan", for young orphaned children. Br. Judson run his own "Mobile Bath Service" in his vehicle for the abandoned.

== Media ==
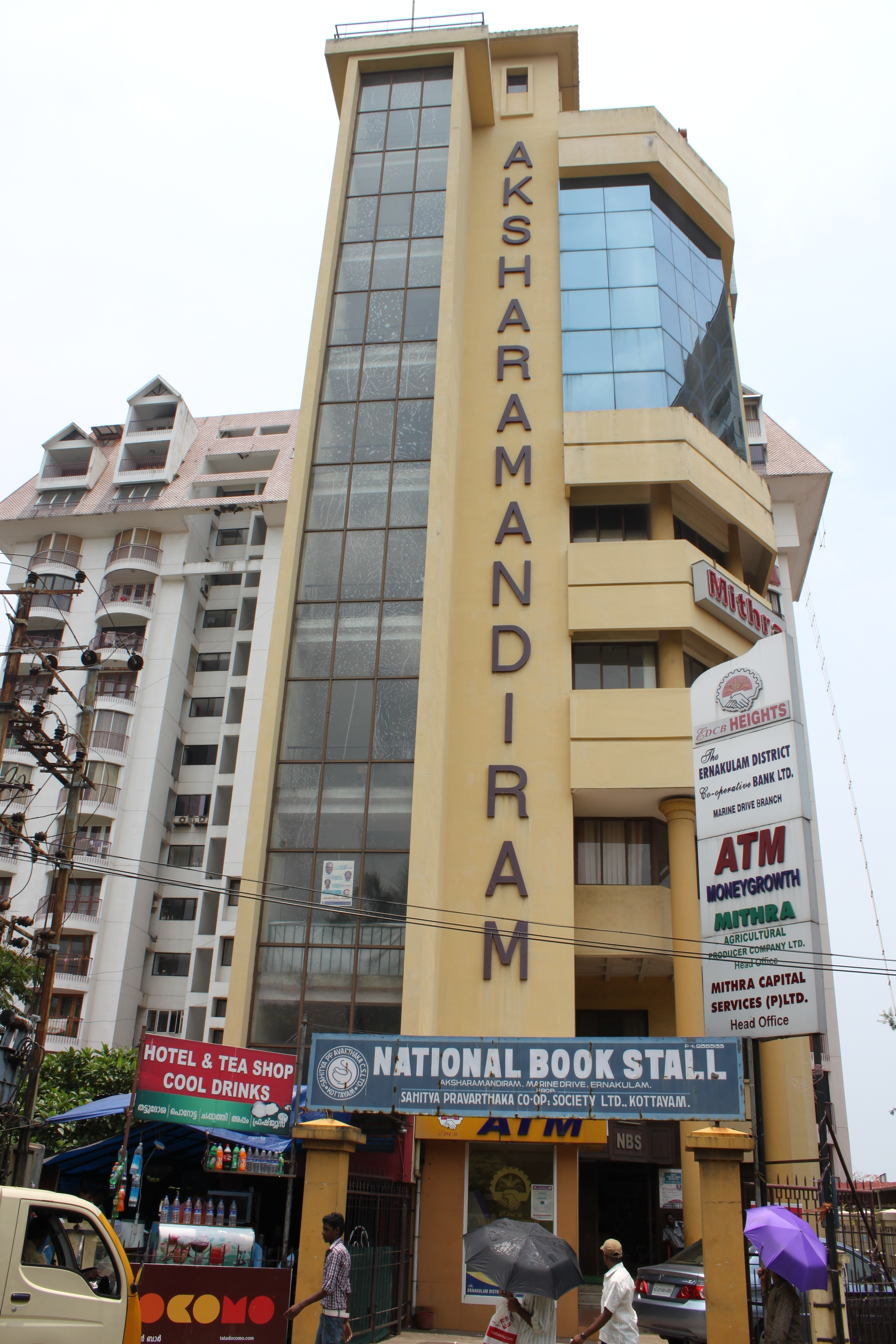
Akshara Mandiram at Marine Drive

Major Malayalam newspapers published in Kochi include Malayala Manorama, Mathrubhumi, Siraj Daily, Madhyamam, Deshabhimani, Deepika, Kerala Kaumudi, Janmabhumi, etc. Popular English newspapers include The Hindu, The New Indian Express, The Times of India, The Pioneer and The Deccan Chronicle. A number of evening papers are also published from the city. Newspapers in other regional languages like Hindi, Kannada, Tamil, and Telugu are also available.

A number of financial publications are also published in the city. These include The Economic Times, Business Line, The Business Standard, and The Financial Express. Prominent magazines and religious publications like the Sathyadeepam, The Week and Vanitha are also published from the city.

Kochi houses several leading Malayalam television channels like Asianet Plus, Flowers, Jeevan TV, Mazhavil Manorama, Kairali We, Manorama News and Reporter TV as well as major news bureaus of Asianet, Kairali TV, Amrita TV and Doordarshan. Prasar Bharati maintains its earth station and broadcasting centre in Kakkanad, Kochi. Satellite television services are available through DD Direct+, Dish TV, Airtel digital TV, Reliance DTH, Sun Direct DTH and Tata Sky. FM radio channels broadcast from Kochi are Rainbow FM (AIR) 101.9 MHz, AIR Kochi 102.3 MHz, Club FM 94.3 MHz, Radio Mango 91.9 MHz, Red FM 93.5 MHz, Radio Mirchi 104.0 MHz.

Kochi is considered to be the hub of the vibrant Malayalam movie industry, especially contemporary Malayalam movies. The rise of Kochi to the centre stage of the entertainment industry occurred coinciding with the economic boom of the last couple of decades. Many movies are shot in Kochi every year. Kochi also has a host of state-of-the-art production and post-production facilities. Due to these reasons, major section of film personalities including of actors, technical experts and other related workers reside in Kochi. There are over 50 cinema halls that screen movies in Malayalam, Tamil, English and Hindi. The city hosts Kerala's first cine multiplex, at the Oberon Mall with four screens. Gold Souk Grande also has a cine multiplex operated by Q cinemas with four screens. PVR with 9 screens is another national multiplex brand that has presence in Kochi and is based out of LuLu International Shopping Mall. Cinepolis at Centre Square Mall with 11 screens is the first international megaplex brand in the state. 16 more multiplex screens are expected in the city in the near future. Kochi is home to the Westford Institute of Film Technology.

The district has the largest number of telephone connections in Kerala. Telephony services are provided by various private sector players like Aircel, Airtel, Idea Cellular, Vodafone, Reliance Infocomm, Tata Docomo, Jio, Tata Indicom and the state owned BSNL. All the private sector telecom companies have their headquarters for Kerala circle located in Kochi.

== Sports ==
Like elsewhere in Kerala, football is arguably the most passionate sport among the locals. In the Indian Super League (ISL), Kerala Blasters represents the city as well as the state of Kerala. The Blasters are one of the most widely supported clubs in the country as well as the fifth most followed football club from Asia in the social media. Kochi was also home to the now defunct football clubs FC Kochin and Chirag United Kerala. FC Kochin is considered as the first fully professional football club from India. Kochi was one of the six cities to host the 2017 FIFA U-17 World Cup held in India.

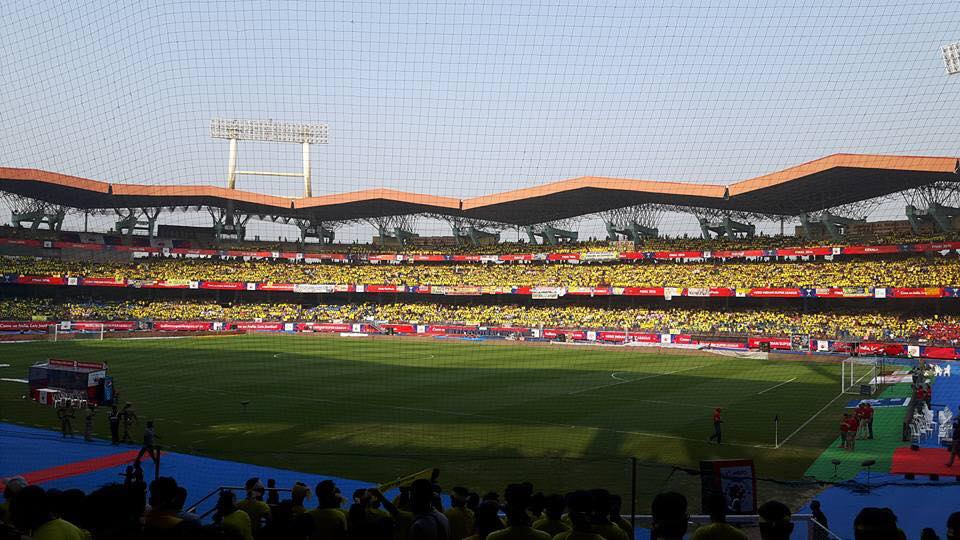
The Jawaharlal Nehru Stadium is one of the largest stadiums in India

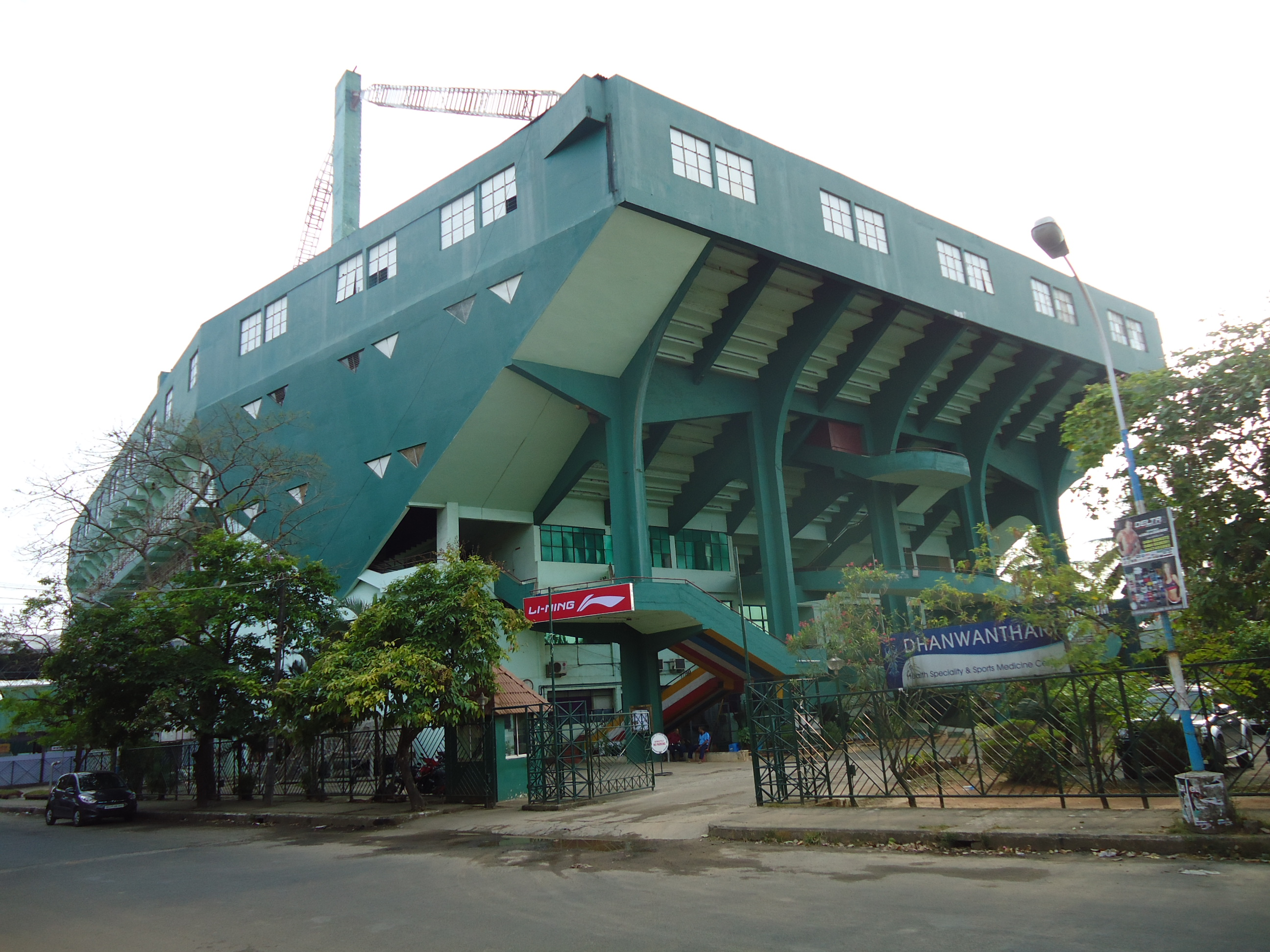
The Regional Sports Centre at Kadavanthra houses the Mahesh Bhupathi Tennis Academy

India's fourth largest stadium and third largest cricket stadium, the Jawaharlal Nehru International Stadium located in Kaloor, is a major facility for football and cricket. Kochi was home to the now defunct Indian Premier League cricket team, Kochi Tuskers Kerala which won franchise rights to play in the 2011 edition of IPL.

The Maharaja's Stadium located on MG Road in the heart of the city, is the major athletic facility in the state with synthetic tracks and turf grass as per international standards. The Ambedkar stadium, maintained by GCDA, was developed exclusively for football with funds from Government of Kerala and FIFA. Spanish club Real Madrid has proposed to set up a football school in Kochi.

The Rajiv Gandhi Sports Complex at Kadavanthra is a major indoor stadium, mainly used for conducting badminton, tennis and basketball tournaments. The 25 m X 10 m swimming pool at the centre is one of the larger water sports facility in the state, where regular swimming competitions and coaching are conducted.

The FACT Grounds at Udyogamandal, Sacred Heart's College Grounds, HMT Grounds at Kalamassery and St. Albert's College Grounds are the other major training facilities for various games like volleyball, badminton, cricket etc.

Kochi has two golf courses in the city and one in the suburbs. The oldest golf club is located at Bolgatty Palace, constructed in 1903, which is a nine-hole facility run by Cochin Golf Club society. The Cochin Golf and Country Club, located near Cochin Airport, operated by CIAL, is Kerala's first 18-hole golf course, with a playing area of over 7,200 yards. The first phase of the all-weather golf course, comprising nine holes, was opened in May 2010 for members and public. The expansion to an 18-hole course is progressing, which is scheduled to be open in September 2012.

Being surrounded by water bodies, the city is ideal for Yachting. The Kerala Yachting Association and the Cochin Yacht Club are located in the city. Both organisations conduct regular yachting tournaments. Kochi was the only Indian city chosen for stopover during the 2008–09 Volvo Ocean Race.

Professional sports clubs based in the city
Club	Sport	League	Ground	Established
Golden Threads FC	Football	Kerala Premier League	Panampilly Ground	2010
Kerala Blasters FC	Football	Indian Super League	Jawaharlal Nehru Stadium	2014
Kochi Blue Spikers	Volleyball	Pro Volleyball League	Rajiv Gandhi Indoor Stadium	2018
Godspeed Kochi	Racing	Indian Racing League		2022
Kochi KD's	Arm Wrestling	Pro Panja League		2023
Forca Kochi FC	Football	Super League Kerala	Jawaharlal Nehru Stadium	2024

== Navy ==
The Southern Naval Command, one of the three main formations of the Indian Navy, has its headquarters in Kochi at INS Venduruthy. It is commanded by the Flag Officer Commanding-in-Chief. The Southern Naval Command consists of Flag Officer Sea Training (FOST), a training squadron, training establishments and bases, and land forces and survey ships. It has a naval air station and a ship repair yard.

Indian Navy Day is also celebrated here. It is a week-long public event showcasing warships, planes, helicopters, and other naval equipment.

The Cochin Shipyard Limited is the largest shipbuilding and maintenance facility in India. In 2020, it finished building the first indigenous aircraft carrier for the Indian Navy.

== Sister cities ==
Kochi is twinned with:

- Norfolk, Virginia, United States
- Menlo Park, California, United States
- Pyatigorsk, Russia

== Notable people ==
- Elijah ha-Adeni
- Soubin Shahir
- Radha Vinod Raju

== See also ==
- Neighbourhoods of Kochi
- List of tallest buildings in Kochi
- Cochin Portuguese Creole
- Cochin Jews
- Largest Indian cities by GDP
