= Thrippunithura Assembly constituency =

Constituency of the Kerala legislative assembly in India

Thrippunithura
- Constituency No. 81 for the Kerala Legislative Assembly
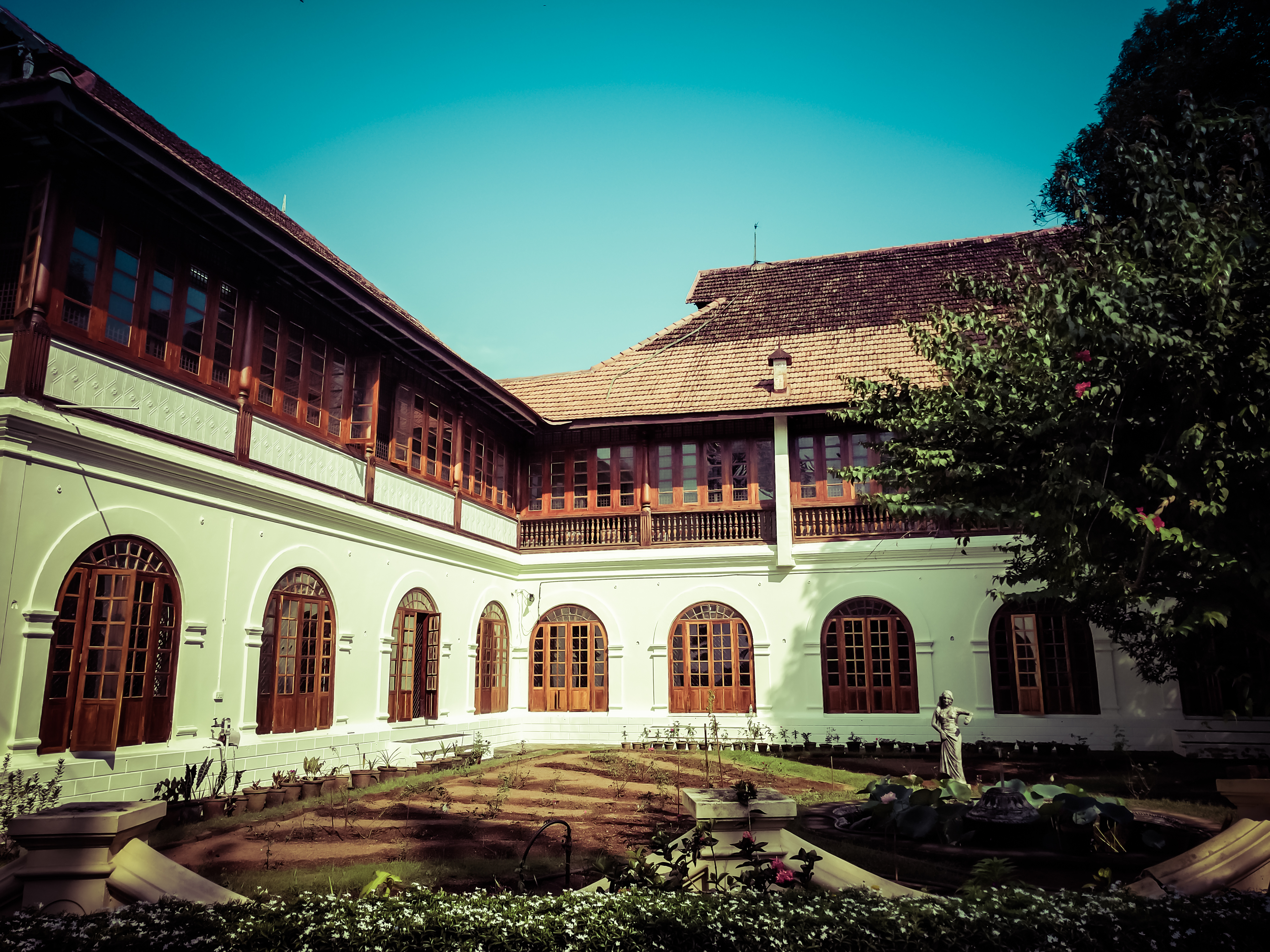
- Hill Palace, Tripunithura

Constituency details
- Country: India
- Region: South India
- State: Kerala
- District: Ernakulam
- Established: 1965
- Total electors: 1,88,040(2026)
- Reservation: None

Member of Legislative Assembly
- 16th Kerala Legislative Assembly
- Incumbent Deepak Joy
- Party: INC
- Alliance: UDF
- Elected year: 2026

Thrippunithura State assembly constituency is one of the 140 state legislative assembly constituencies in Kerala in southern India. It is also one of the seven state legislative assembly constituencies included in Ernakulam Lok Sabha constituency. As of the 2026 Assembly elections, the current MLA is Deepak Joy of Indian National Congress.

== Local self-governed segments ==
Thrippunithura Assembly constituency is composed of the following eight wards of the Kochi Municipal Corporation (Palluruthy zone) in Kochi Taluk, and two Municipalities and two Gram Panchayats in Kanayannur Taluk:

Wards of Kochi Municipal Corporation in Thrippunithura Assembly constituency
Ward no.	Name	Ward no.	Name	Ward no.	Name
13	Kadebhagam	14	Thazhuppu	15	Edakochi North
16	Edakochi South	17	Perumbadappu	18	Konam
19	Palluruthy-Kacheripady	20	Nambyapuram		

All of the above eight wards are included in Kochi Taluk.

Other Local Bodies in Thrippunithura Assembly constituency
Sl no.	Name	Local Body Type	Taluk
1	Thrippunithura	Municipality	Kanayannur
2	Maradu	Municipality	Kanayannur
3	Kumbalam	Grama panchayat	Kanayannur
4	Udayamperoor	Grama panchayat	Kanayannur

== Members of Legislative Assembly ==
The following list contains all members of Kerala Legislative Assembly who have represented the constituency:

Key

Independent INC CPI(M)

Election	Niyama Sabha	Member	Party	Tenure
1967	3rd	T. K. Ramakrishnan	CPI(M)	1967 – 1970
1970	4th	Paul P. Mani	INC	1970 – 1977
1977	5th	T. K. Ramakrishnan	CPI(M)	1977 – 1980
1980	6th	T. K. Ramakrishnan	CPI(M)	1980 – 1982
1982	7th	K. G. R. Kartha	NDP	1982 – 1987
1987	8th	V. Viswanatha Menon	CPI(M)	1987 – 1991
1991	9th	K. Babu	INC	1991 – 1996
1996	10th	K. Babu	INC	1996 – 2001
2001	11th	K. Babu	INC	2001 – 2006
2006	12th	K. Babu	INC	2006 – 2011
2011	13th	K. Babu	INC	2011 – 2016
2016	14th	M. Swaraj	CPI(M)	2016 - 2021
2021	15th	K. Babu	INC	2021 - 2026
2026	16th	Deepak Joy	INC	Incumbent

== Election results ==
=== 2026 ===
There were 1,88,040 registered voters in Thrippunithura assembly constituency in the 2026 assembly election.

2026 Kerala Legislative Assembly election: Thrippunithura
Party	Candidate	Votes	%	±%
INC	Deepak Joy	70,256	45.47	▲4.33
CPI(M)	K. N. Unnikrishnan	51,788	33.51	▼5.70
TTP	Anjali Nair	29,471	19.07	▲3.87
NOTA	None of the above	1,171	0.76	▲0.06
Independent	Unnikrishnan K N	544	0.35	−
BSP	Karthikeyan	424	0.27	−
Independent	Sandeep Rajendraprasad	376	0.24	−
AAP	Thomas Paul Komaroth	272	0.18	−
SUCI(C)	Satheesan	148	0.10	▼0.10
Independent	Rajkumar	77	0.05	−
Margin of victory		18468	11.95	▲11.72
Turnout		1,54,527	82.18	▲8.30
INC hold		Swing	-	

=== 2021 ===
There were 2,11,581 registered voters in the constituency for the 2021 Kerala Assembly election.

2021 Kerala Legislative Assembly election: Thripunithura
Party	Candidate	Votes	%	±%
INC	K. Babu	66,875	41.14	▲3.50
CPI(M)	M. Swaraj	64,883	39.21	▼1.32
BJP	Dr. K. S. Radhakrishnan	23,756	15.20	▼4.09
NOTA	None of the above	1,099	0.70	−
SS	Arun Babu	232	0.15	−
Independent	Rajesh Pairoad	201	0.13	−
SUCI(C)	C. B. Asokan	173	0.11	▲0.01
Independent	K. P. Ayappen	88	0.06	−
Margin of victory		1232	0.23	▼2.66
Turnout		1,78,307	73.88	▼4.15
INC gain from CPI(M)		Swing	▲4.50	

=== 2016 ===
There were 1,98,245 registered voters in the constituency for the 2016 Kerala Assembly election.

2016 Kerala Legislative Assembly election: Thripunithura
Party	Candidate	Votes	%	±%
CPI(M)	M. Swaraj	62,346	40.53	▼0.78
INC	K. Babu	58,230	37.64	▼15.72
BJP	Thuravoor Vishwambharan	29,843	19.29	▲15.52
NOTA	None of the above	1,028	0.66	−
BSP	T. A. Kamarudeen	683	0.44	▼0.19
SDPI	Sudheer Yousaf	594	0.38	−
PDP	Padmini D. Netoor	410	0.27	−
Independent	Swaraj Manickathan	394	0.25	−
Independent	Saju Kolattukudy	172	0.11	−
SUCI(C)	Sudha M. P.	156	0.10	−
Independent	Sonia Jose	128	0.08	−
Independent	Gireesh Babu	122	0.08	−
Independent	K. N. Pradeep	116	0.07	−
Independent	Ayyapan	112	0,07	−
Margin of victory		4,467	2.89	
Turnout		1,54,685	78.03	▲1.73
CPI(M) gain from INC		Swing		

=== 2011 ===
There were 1,71,652 registered voters in the constituency for the 2011 election.

2011 Kerala Legislative Assembly election: Thripunithura
Party	Candidate	Votes	%	±%
INC	K. Babu	69,886	53.36	
CPI(M)	C. M. Dinesh Mani	54,108	41.31	
BJP	Sabu Varghese	4,942	3.77	−
BSP	Karthikeyan	826	0.63	−
Independent	Babu Keezhathuparamu	330	0.25	−
Independent	Saju Kolattukudy	327	0.25	
SS	Saji Thuruthikunnel	316	0.24	−
Independent	P. K. Thankamani	137	0.10	−
Independent	K. P. Ayyapan	105	0.08	−
Margin of victory		15,778	12.05	
Turnout		1,30,977	76.30	
INC hold		Swing		

=== 2006 ===
There were 2,02,066 registered voters in the constituency for the 2006 election.

2006 Kerala Legislative Assembly election: Thrippunithura
Party	Candidate	Votes	%	±%
INC	K. Babu	70,935	50.7	
CPI(M)	K. N. Raveendranath	63,593	45.4	
BJP	P. N. Shankaranarayanan	3,095	2.2	
Independent	Raveendranath A. K.	636	0.5	
Independent	Raveendranath C. D.	561	0.4	
BSP	Ambalathara Vasu	501	0.4	
Independent	Babu Krishnan	206	0.2	
LJP	Ramachandran P. H.	192	0.1	
Independent	Ayyappan	148	0.1	
Independent	P. T. Poulose	130	0.1	
Margin of victory		7,342	5.2	
Turnout		1,40,000	69.3	
INC hold		Swing		

=== 2001 ===
There were 2,14,469 registered voters in the constituency for the 2001 election.

2001 Kerala Legislative Assembly election: Thrippunithura
Party	Candidate	Votes	%	±%
INC	K. Babu	81,590	55.4	
CPI(M)	K. Chandran Pillai	57,294	38.9	
BJP	Adv. M. Rajendra Kumar	6,483	4.4	
Independent	Babu	663	0.5	
Independent	M. V. Sivan	450	0.3	
Independent	Tomy Varghese	373	0.3	
Independent	Ashraf	328	0.2	
Independent	Chandran Nair	233	0.2	
Margin of victory		24,296	16.5	
Turnout		1,47,418	68.7	
INC hold		Swing		

== See also ==
- Thrippunithura
- Ernakulam district
- List of constituencies of the Kerala Legislative Assembly
- 2016 Kerala Legislative Assembly election
