= Vypen Assembly constituency =

Constituency of the Kerala legislative assembly in India

Vypin
- Constituency No. 79 for the Kerala Legislative Assembly
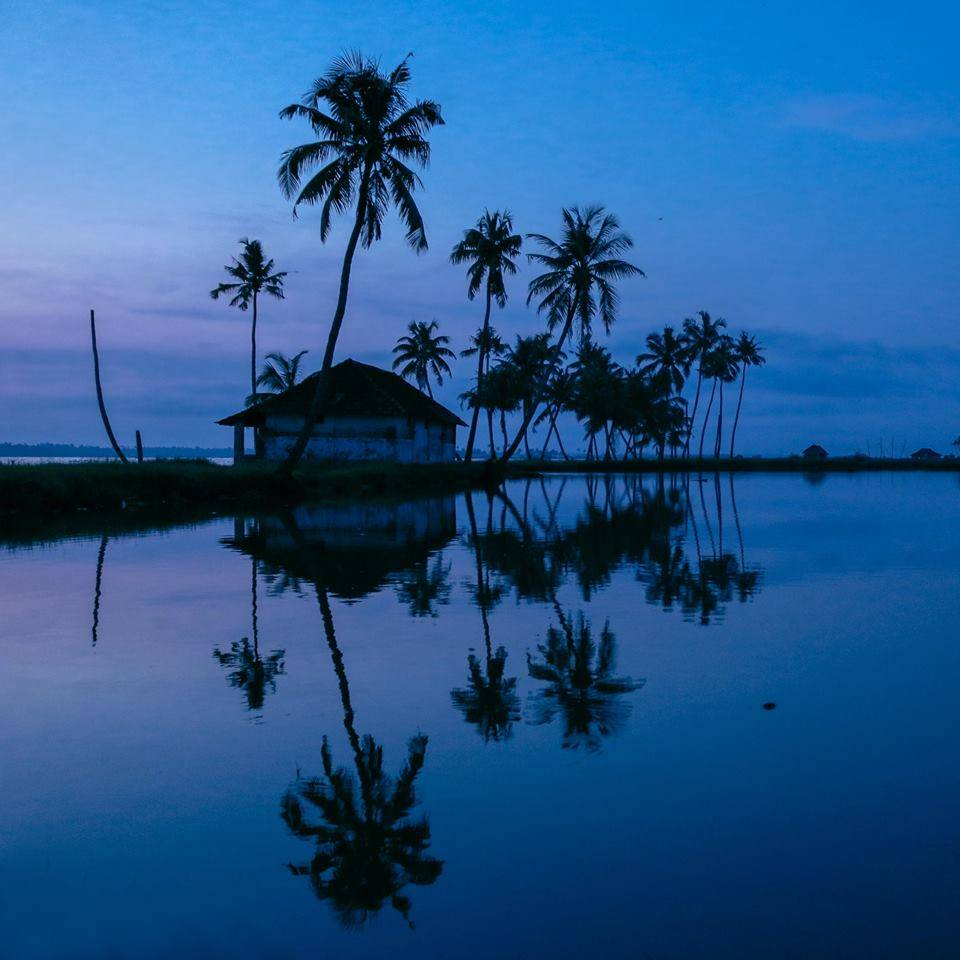
- Nedungad at Nayarambalam

Constituency details
- Country: India
- Region: South India
- State: Kerala
- District: Ernakulam
- Established: 2008
- Total electors: 1,61,381 (2026)
- Reservation: None

Member of Legislative Assembly
- 16th Kerala Legislative Assembly
- Incumbent Tony Chammany
- Party: INC
- Alliance: UDF

Vypin State assembly constituency is one of the 140 state legislative assembly constituencies in Kerala in southern India. It is also one of the seven state legislative assembly constituencies included in Ernakulam Lok Sabha constituency. As of the 2026 Assembly elections, the current MLA is Tony Chammany of Indian National Congress.

Vypin Assembly constituency was established by the 2008 delimitation. Before, it used to be known as Njarackal Assembly constituency from 1957 to 2008.

== Local self-governed segments ==
The constituency lies in the islands of Vypin. It is composed of the following local self-governed segments:

Sl no.	Name	Status (Grama panchayat/Municipality)	Taluk
1	Edavanakkad	Grama panchayat	Kochi
2	Elamkunnapuzha	Grama panchayat	Kochi
3	Kuzhuppilly	Grama panchayat	Kochi
4	Nayarambalam	Grama panchayat	Kochi
5	Njarackal	Grama panchayat	Kochi
6	Pallippuram	Grama panchayat	Kochi
7	Kadamakkudy	Grama panchayat	Kanayannur
8	Mulavukad	Grama panchayat	Kanayannur

== Members of Legislative Assembly ==
The following list contains all members of Kerala Legislative Assembly who have represented the constituency:

=== Njarackal ===
Election	Niyama Sabha	Name	Party	Tenure
1957	1st	K. C. Abraham	Indian National Congress	1957 – 1960
1960	2nd	K. C. Abraham	Indian National Congress	1960 – 1965
1967	3rd	A. S. Purushothaman	Communist Party of India	1967 – 1970
1970	4th	M. K. Raghavan	Indian National Congress	1970 – 1977
1977	5th	T. A. Paraman	Revolutionary Socialist Party	1977 – 1980
1980	6th	M. K. Krishnan	Communist Party of India	1980 – 1982
1982	7th	P. K. Velayudhan	Independent	1982 – 1987
1987	8th	K. K. Madhavan	Indian Congress	1987 – 1991
1991	9th	K.Kunjambu, bypoll(1992) V.K.Babu	Indian National Congress	1991 – 1996
1996	10th	M A Kuttapan	Indian National Congress	1996 – 2001
2001	11th	M A Kuttapan	Indian National Congress	2001 – 2006
2006	12th	M. K. Purushothaman	Communist Party of India	2006 – 2011

=== Vypen ===
Election	Niyama Sabha	Name	Party	Tenure
2011	13th	S. Sharma	Communist Party of India	2011 – 2016
2016	14th	S. Sharma	Communist Party of India	2016-2021
2021	15th	K. N. Unnikrishnan	Communist Party of India	2021-2026
2026	16th	Tony Chammany	Indian National Congress	Incumbent

== Election results ==
Percentage change (±%) denotes the change in the number of votes from the immediate previous election.

=== 2026 ===
There were 1,61,381 registered voters in the constituency for the 2026 Kerala Assembly election.

2026 Kerala Legislative Assembly election: Vypen
Party	Candidate	Votes	%	±%
INC	Tony Chammany	66,112	50.18	▲15.22
CPI(M)	Adv. M. B. Shyni	50,464	38.3	▼2.94
TTP	Anitha Thomas	13,637	10.35	▼2.44
NOTA	None of the above	781	0.59	▲0.19
AAP	Mohandas P G	342	0.26	−
CPI(ML) Red Star	T C Subrahmanyan	262	0.2	−
Independent	Sadasivan	163	0.12	−
Margin of victory		15,648	11.87	▲5.59
Turnout		1,31,761	81.65	
INC gain from CPI(M)		Swing		

=== 2021 ===
There were 1,72,086 registered voters in the constituency for the 2021 Kerala Assembly election.

2021 Kerala Legislative Assembly election: Vypen
Party	Candidate	Votes	%	±%
CPI(M)	K. N. Unnikrishnan	53,858	41.24	▼11.00
INC	Deepak Joy	45,657	34.96	▼2.53
TTP	Job Chakkalackal	16,707	12.79	New
BJP	K. S. Shaiju	13,540	10.37	−
NOTA	None of the above	525	0.40	−
Independent	M. K. Mukundan	309	0.24	−
Margin of victory		8,201	6.28	▼8.47
Turnout		1,30,596	75.89	▲3.98
CPI(M) hold		Swing	▼11.00	

=== 2016 ===
There were 1,64,237 registered voters in the constituency for the 2016 Kerala Assembly election.

2016 Kerala Legislative Assembly election: Vypen
Party	Candidate	Votes	%	±%
CPI(M)	S. Sharma	68,526	52.24	▲1.87
INC	K. R. Subhash	49,173	37.49	▼8.54
BDJS	Vamalochanan K. K.	10,051	7.66	−
WPOI	Jyothidas Paravur	1,406	1.07	−
NOTA	None of the above	910	0.69	−
CPI(ML)L	Manjuladevi	248	0.19	−
API	Rajeev Naagan	231	0.18	−
Independent	Subhash K. S.	217	0.17	−
PDP	K. D. Vishwanathan	183	0.14	−
Independent	Kodickal Sadasivan	136	0.10	−
Independent	S. D. Satheesh	88	0.07	−
Margin of victory		19,353	14.75	▲10.41
Turnout		1,31,169	79.87	▲0.47
CPI(M) hold		Swing	▲1.87	

=== 2011 ===
There were 1,52,040 registered voters in the constituency for the 2011 election.

2011 Kerala Legislative Assembly election: Vypen
Party	Candidate	Votes	%	±%
CPI(M)	S. Sharma	60,530	50.37	
INC	Ajay Tharayil	55,572	46.03	
BJP	T. G. Surendran	2,930	2.43	−
BSP	T. K. Sivanandan	546	0.45	−
Independent	Santhosh Sarma	490	0.41	−
Independent	Benny Joseph	374	0.31	
Margin of victory		5,242	4.34	
Turnout		1,20,726	79.40	
CPI(M) win (new seat)				

== See also ==
- Vypin
- Ernakulam district
- List of constituencies of the Kerala Legislative Assembly
- 2016 Kerala Legislative Assembly election
