= Kuzhuppilly =

- Village
- Location in Kerala, India Kuzhuppilly (India)
- Coordinates: 10.115°N 76.20°E
- Country: India
- State: Kerala
- District: Ernakulam
- Talukas: Kochi
- Elevation: 1 m (3.3 ft)

Population (2011)
  - Total: 12,137

Languages
  - Official: Malayalam, English
- Time zone: UTC+5:30 (IST)
- PIN: 682 501
- Telephone code: 0484
- Vehicle registration: KL-42

Kuzhuppilly is a suburb of Kochi city and a tourist destination in Vypin Island in Kerala, India. The areas in Kuzhuppilly village are Pallathamkulangara, Cheruvaipu, Thundippuram, Manappally, and Ayyampilly.

== Statistics ==
The total population per the 2001 census is 12,120 and the number of houses is 2,701.

== Location ==
Kuzhuppilly village is 18 km towards the northwest of Kochi. It is 26 km from Cochin International Airport and 4.5 km from Cherai Beach. It is covered by Ayyambilly Post Office with PIN 682 501.

The Panchayat is situated by Pallipuram Grama Panchayat to the north and Edavanakkad Grama Panchayath to the south. The east border is Veeranpuzha, the northern extension of Vembanad Lake and the Arabian Sea is the western border.

== Places of interest ==
The village contains the Pallathamkulangara Bhagavathi Temple, Sree Balakrishna Swami Temple, St. Augustine's Church, Mahadeva Temple, Ayyampilly Mahadeva Temple, and Chempoozhi Sree Dharmasastha Temple. Pulauyavamshodharini sabha Sree Rajalangaramoorthy temple is at Cheruvype.

Kuzhuppilly Beach is an upcoming tourist spot in Kerala. It was identified as a potential tourism spot by the authorities. The beach beautification project is being implemented at a cost of Rs 46 lakh by the government.

== Establishments and offices ==
PBD Lower Primary School, St John's L.P. School, Manappilly, Cheruvypu LP School, St. Augustine's Girls High School, and St. Gregorious Upper Primary School are in Kuzhuppilly village.

There are 12 Aanganwadis in Kuzhuppilly, nine of which function in their own building.

The office of Vypin Block Panchayath consisting the Grama Panchayath's of Njarakkal, Nayarambalam, Edavanakkad, Kuzhuppilly, and Pallippuram is located in Kuzhuppilly Village.

Kuzhuppilly has a Krishi Bhavan to help the agriculturists.

The Department of Dairy Development, Kerala has a Dairy Extension Service Unit at Vypin Block Office, Kuzhuppilly. The Dairy Extension Officer is in charge of the activities.

The department of Industries and Commerce, Kerala has an Industries Extension officer functioning in Vypin block office. He is in charge for guidance of industrial activities in the block area

The Office of the Sub-Registrar, Kuzhuppilly is located in Kuzhuppilly, who is authorised for maintaining the land registers of Edavanakkad Gramapanchayath, Kuzhuppilly Grama Panchayath, and Pallippuram Grama Panchayath.

Ayyampilly Government Hospital is situated here for mainstream ("Western") treatment.

Other establishments include Panchayath Public Library and Reading Room, SP Mukherji Memorial Library and a Veterinary Government Hospital.

== Civic administration ==
The village is administered by the Grama Panchayath. Kuzhuppilly comes under Vypin Assembly Constituency (Malayalam - നിയോജക മണഡലം) and Ernakulam Parliamentary Constituency

== Geography ==
The village has freshwater prawn farms (Malayalam - ചെമ്മീന്കെട്ട്) and paddy fields which yield about 600 kg/acre.

== Economy ==
Sea fishing, prawn farming and seafood processing are some of the sources of income of the Kuzhuppilly. The main agricultural produces include rice, coconut and arecanut. Trading and services add to the income of Kuzhuppilly due to its proximity to the city of Kochi.
