= Perumpadappu =

Perumpadappu may refer to:

- Perumpadappu, Malappuram, Kerala state, India
- Perumpadappu, Ernakulam, Kerala state, India
