= Nayarambalam =

- suburb
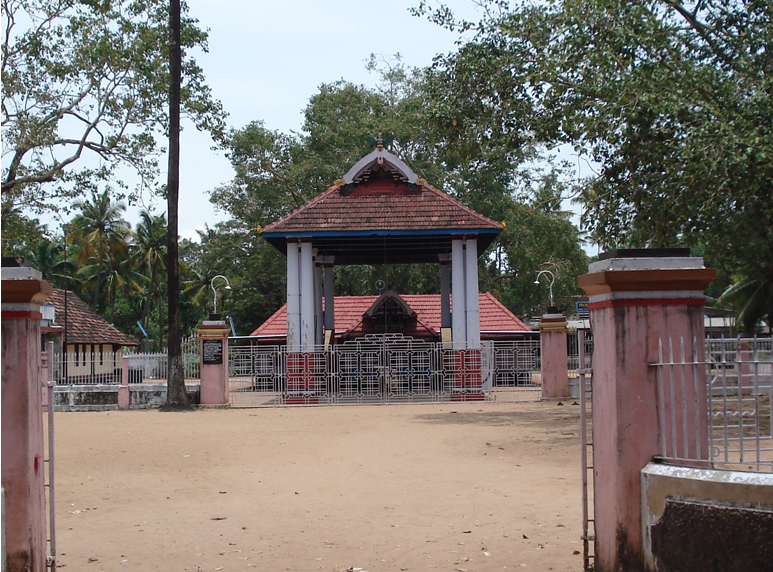
- Nayarambalam Bhagavathy Temple
- Interactive map of Nayarambalam
- Coordinates: 10.071°N 76.212°E
- Country: India
- State: Kerala
- District: Ernakulam district

Government
  - Panchayath President: Mrs. Neehu Binodh

Area
  - Total: 1,219 ha (3,010 acres)
- Elevation: 2.83 m (9.3 ft)

Population (2011 Census)
  - Total: 24,127
  - Density: 1,783/km^{2} (4,620/sq mi)

Languages
  - Official: Malayalam, English
- Time zone: UTC+5:30 (IST)
- PIN: 682509
- Telephone code: 0484
- Temperature Range: 22 °C – 31 °C

Nayarambalam is a suburb of Kochi city and coastal village on Vypin island in the state of Kerala, India.

The village is surrounded by Edavanakkad Gram panchayat to the north, Narakkal Gram Panchayat to the south, the Arabian Sea to the west and Veeranpuzha to the east. Nayarambalam lies almost at the center of Vypin Island. Agriculture and fishing were traditionally the main sources of income for the people, but now most of the people depend on Kochi city, the nearest city on the mainland. There are still many paddy fields and fish ponds especially in the eastern and western areas of the village.

== Demographics ==
These details are taken from the official website of the Kerala Government.

Demographic	Value
Area in ha^{2}.	1219 hectares
Wards	16
Occupied residential houses	4240
Households	4240
Male population	11313
Female population	11853
Total population	23166
Density of population per km^{2}	1783
Sex ratio (females per 1000 males)	1047
Effective literacy rate (male)	97.26
Effective literacy rate (female)	92.26
Effective literacy rate (total)	94.69

== Etymology ==
Nayarambalam, the name originated from Nakar (serpant) and Ambalam ( temple). The Nagaraja Temple then became Nakarambalam,later evolved into Nayarambalam.

== Local administration ==
Address:
Nayarambalam Grama Panchayat,
Nayarambalam – 682 509
Office phone: 0484–2493339

== Elected members of Nayarambalam Panchayat ==
Nayarambalam Grama Panchayat: October 2025 election results:

Ward number	Ward name	Elected Member	Role	Alliance	Reservation
1	Puthen Kadappuram	Jithin P A	Member	NDA	General
2	Temple West	Jinsha Balaji	Member	LDF	Woman
3	Mangalya	Vijila Radhakrishnan	Member	UDF	Woman SC
4	Thayyezhuthu	Sumesh M S	Member	LDF	General
5	Vadakke Nedungad	Shibu N P	Member	LDF	General
6	Nedungad Central	Mevis Bibin	Member	UDF	Woman
7	Thekke Nedungad	Remya Brijesh	Member	UDF	Woman
8	Manattuparambu East	Seena Antony	Member	UDF	Woman
9	Kadekkurishu	Hena Vijayaraghavan	Member	UDF	Woman SC
10	Bhagavathi Temple South	Madhu V R	Member	LDF	General
11	Vadel Church	Jainy Xavier	Member	UDF	Woman
12	Vadel East	Joby Varghese	Member	UDF	General
13	Ramankulangara	Nijo Joseph	Member	UDF	General
14	Manattuparambu West	Jithin Lal	Member	Independent	General
15	Kudungassery	Gireeshan N R	Member	UDF	SC
16	Kochambalam	Suma Venu	Member	LDF	Woman
17	Gurumandiram	Jisha Sreeraj	Member	UDF	Woman

This information was based on Election Results of Local Body Election 2025 published by the Kerla State Election Commission.

== Places of interest ==
- Cherai Beach is 8 km away from Nayarambalam.
- In the east border of Nayarambalam is Vembanad lake which is known as Veeranpuzha.
- Nayarambalam has a good beach with very few visitors. Many people come here for angling.
- Bhagavathy Temple is one of the main Hindu temples in Nayarambalam, situated in the middle of the village facing the main Vypin-Munambam Road. The temple is maintained by Nayarambalam Nair Karayogam. The festival in the temple is observed every year during the 15th to 20th of the Malayalam month of Makaram (the last week of January to the first week of February). During the festivity period a variety of South Indian classical dance dramas and performing arts like Kathakali, Ottanthullal, Thayambaka, Panchavadyam, and Chendamelam are performed by renowned artists and performers.
- Badhra Bhagavathi Temple is another temple situated near Vypin Munambam Road. It faces the north and is believed to be very powerful. It warms the devotees with the goddess' divine grace and grants them their wishes. It is maintained by Pallathupadi Trust.

== Roads ==
Vypeen-Pallipuram State Highway 63 (SH 63) passes through Nayarambalam.

== Hospitals ==
Veterinary hospital

The 25 bedded Govt. Ayurveda Hospital is owned by the public health department of the State Government of Kerala. The Public Health Center is situated in the beach area (Puthen Kadappuram). As part of the Aardram programme in 2017–18, Nayarambalam Primary Health Center was upgraded to a Family Health Centre (FHC). This was part of a larger initiative that saw 13 other primary health centers in the district similarly transformed.

There are two medical centers in private sector also functioning here; one is Sarada Hospital (formerly Sarada Nursing Home),established in 1979,a dedicated multi speciality hospital which has been in patient care sector for the past 5 decades which includes general medicine, infertility, family medicine, neurology, cardiology, diabetology, dermatology, psychiatry and physiotherapy pioneered by Dr. K R Ramachandra Menon and Dr. Vanaja Menon with a vision of specialty medical care in the rural areas of Vypin.

The other center is Nayarambalam Medical Centre. There are also several allopathic and homoeopathic clinics. In the speciality clinic, there is a small ENT clinic, Trinity, run by Dr. Thomas W Menacherry. A periodontic center, Smyle, run by Dr. Biniraj, is located just outside the Nayarambalam-Narakkal boundary.

== Churches and temples ==
Sanjopuram Church

Nayarambalam is blessed with many churches and temples. Nayarambalam Bhagavathy Temple, Sankara Narayana Temple, Kochambalam Sri Subrahmania Temple, and Mahavishnu Temple Veliyethamparambu, Mannateswari Bhagavathy temple are some of the prominent Hindu temples in Nayarmabmalam.

Major Christian churches include St. George Church (Wadel), established in the 1844, Sacred Heart Church (Manattuparambu) (both are under Verapoli Arch Diocese) St. Joseph's Church (Sanjopuram), and St. Augustine's Church (Nedungadu). In addition there are many small temples and chapels scattered around the village. A Muslim temple (mosque) is situated at the extreme north frontier of the village. There is also a Sri Sathya Sai Seva Samithi, which is active in the field of social service.

== Educational institutions ==
There are two high schools and many primary schools in Nayarambalam. These include Nayarambalam Bhagavathy Vilasom Higher Secondary School, Lobelia English Medium Higher Secondary School, Devi Vilasom Upper Primary School, and Vadel Lower Primary School.

== Schools ==
=== Lower primary schools ===
There are three LP schools in Nayarambalam.

- St. George LP School, Nayarambalam (Aided School): one of the oldest schools in Nayarambalam, managed by St. George Church, Wadel Nayarambalam
- Sacred Heart LP School, Nedungad, Nayarambalam

=== Upper primary schools ===
- Devi Vilasam UP School, Nayarambalam: Managed by Bhagavathy Temple Karayogam, Nayarambalam. School is located at Veliyathamparambu adjacent to the State Highway. Medium of instruction is Malayalam. Classes are held from Standard 6 to Standard 7.
- Union UP School, Thekke Nedungad

=== Higher Secondary schools ===
- Bhagavathy Vilasam Higher Secondary School (Aided School): One of the oldest high schools in Nayarambalam. Managed by Bhagavathy Temple Karayogam, Nayarambalam. Many Nayarambalam men received their high school education from this school. The same management runs another school, Devi Vilasam, in the lower primary level at Veliyathamparambu, Nayarambalam.

=== Higher secondary schools ===
- Lobelia English Medium Higher Secondary School (private management): Lobelia is the first English medium school at Nayarambalam. Classes are held from Standard 1 to Standard 12 (Plus2). The school is located between Kochambalam and Kudungasserry, adjacent to the State Highway.

=== Special schools ===
- Karuna Special School for Mentally Retarded Children: The school is managed by Sisters of St. George Carmel Convent. Located very near to St. George Church Wadel, Karuna School is the only special school in Vypeen Island. Official website: https://www.karunaspecialschool.com/

=== Public schools ===
- St. George Carmel Public School (private management): The school is managed by Sisters of St. George Carmel Convent.

== Colleges ==
=== Prayaga College and Computer Academy ===
- Prayaga College, established in 1988, is the biggest parallel college-cum-tuition centre in the entire Vypeen Island. Approximately 1200 students are currently studying in this college. A wing of Prayaga, Prayaga Computer Academy (PCA), provides professional computer education in the island. The current principal and director is P. T. Prakasan.

== Agriculture ==
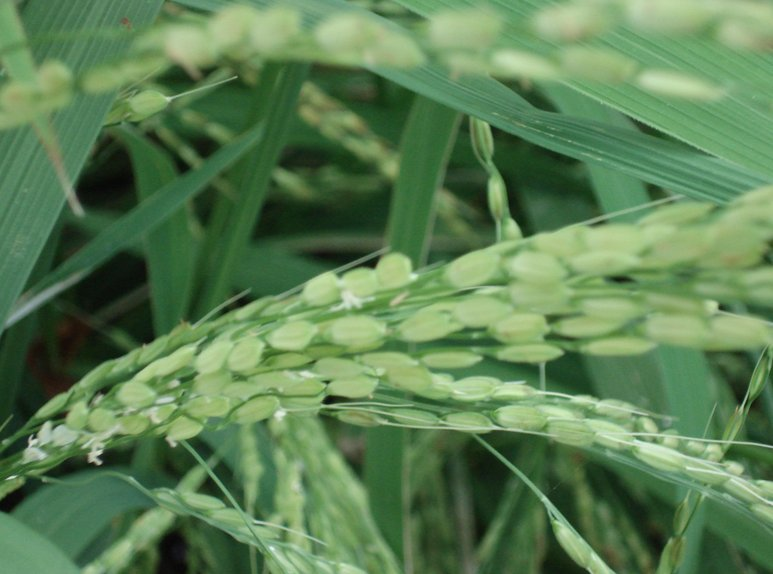
The Pokkali cyclic paddy cultivation method was widely used in Nayarambalam until recently.

An Agricultural office (Krishi Bhavan) is functioning near to the Panchayath Building.

Nayarambalam historically practiced the Pokkali cyclic paddy cultivation method.Wiki Citation After the harvest, the decaying stubble of the paddy serves as food for the prawns and likewise the prawn excreta make the field fertile. No pesticides or fertilizers are used in the fields, in contrast to other prevalent farming practices.

As in other areas of Kerala, paddy fields are widely being reclaimed in Nayarambalam. Pokkali paddy-cum-prawn farming (cyclic farming method) was the traditional practice for farming. The Pokkali farming method is an eco-friendly farming practice.

== Gallery ==
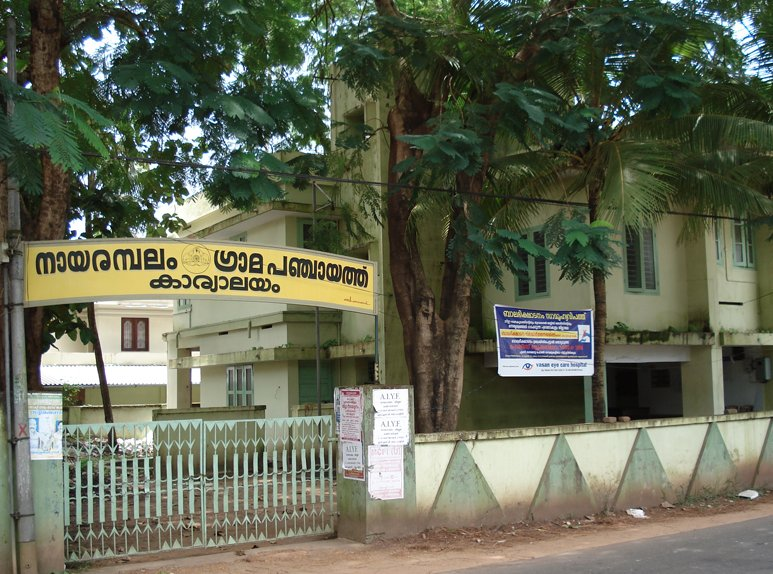
Nayarambalam Panchayath office

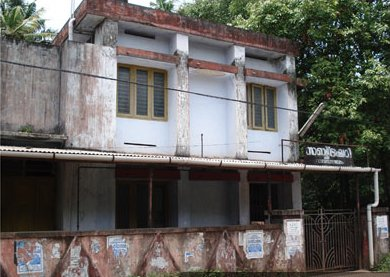
Treasury building

Devi Vilasam UPS is managed by NSS Karayogam, Nayarambalam. It is located at Veliyathamparambu Bus Stop.

Bhagavathy Vilasam High school is one of the oldest high schools in Vypeen Island.

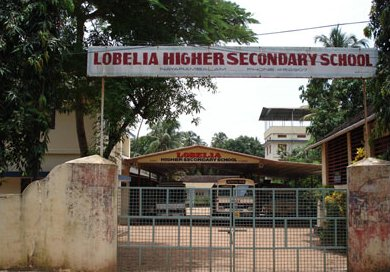
LEMHS is the first English medium School at Nayarambalam and is thought to be the first English medium school in Vypin Island. School Manager is Madhavan Pillai.

Karuna Special School, run by Carmelite Sisters

== Notable People ==
Joshual Valiyaparambil Josy, Geologist
