= Deepak Joy =

Indian politician (born 1983)

Member of the Kerala Legislative Assembly, from Thrippunithura
- Incumbent
- Assumed office 21 May 2026
- Preceded by: K. Babu
- Constituency: Thrippunithura

Deputy mayor of the Kochi Municipal Corporation
- In office 2025-2026
- Mayor: Minimol V. K.
- Constituency: 19 - Ayyappankavu division
- Succeeded by: V.R. Sudheer

Personal details
- Born: Deepak Joy; 1983 (age 42–43) Ernakulam district, Kerala, India
- Party: Indian National Congress
- Parent: Joy (father)
- Education: Graduate
- Occupation: Politician, Businessman

Deepak Joy (born 1983) is an Indian politician serving as the member of the legislative assembly (MLA) for the Thrippunithura constituency in the Kerala Legislative Assembly. A leader of the Indian National Congress, he was elected in the 2026 Kerala Legislative Assembly election, succeeding veteran leader K. Babu. Prior to his election to the state assembly, he served as the deputy mayor of the Kochi Municipal Corporation.

== Early life and education ==
Deepak Joy was born to Joy in the Ernakulam district of Kerala. He has been a long-time resident of Ernakulam North and was actively involved in student politics through the Kerala Students Union (KSU). He is a graduate and has been involved in business and local governance before his entry into the legislature.

== Political career ==
Joy rose to prominence in local governance, serving as a councillor in the Kochi Municipal Corporation and later as its deputy mayor. In the 2026 Kerala Assembly elections, he was nominated by the Congress for the Thripunithura seat after sitting MLA K. Babu chose not to contest.

In the final results declared on 4 May 2026, Joy secured a decisive victory, polling 70,256 votes. He defeated his nearest rival, K. N. Unnikrishnan of the CPI(M), by a margin of 18,468 votes. His victory was noted for significantly increasing the UDF's margin in a constituency that had seen a very close contest in 2021.

== Election results ==
=== 2026 Kerala Legislative Assembly election ===
Party	Candidate	Votes	%	±%	
	INC	Deepak Joy	70,256	46.31	+4.17
	CPI(M)	K. N. Unnikrishnan	51,788	34.14	-7.36
	Twenty20	P. V. Anjaly	29,471	19.43	-
Margin of victory		18,468	12.17		
Total valid votes		1,51,718			
INC hold		Swing	+5.76		
