= Pallipuram Fort =

Building in India

Pallippuram Fort
- Paliport Castelo em Cima (Castle on the Top)
- Pallippuram, Vyppin, Ernakulam district
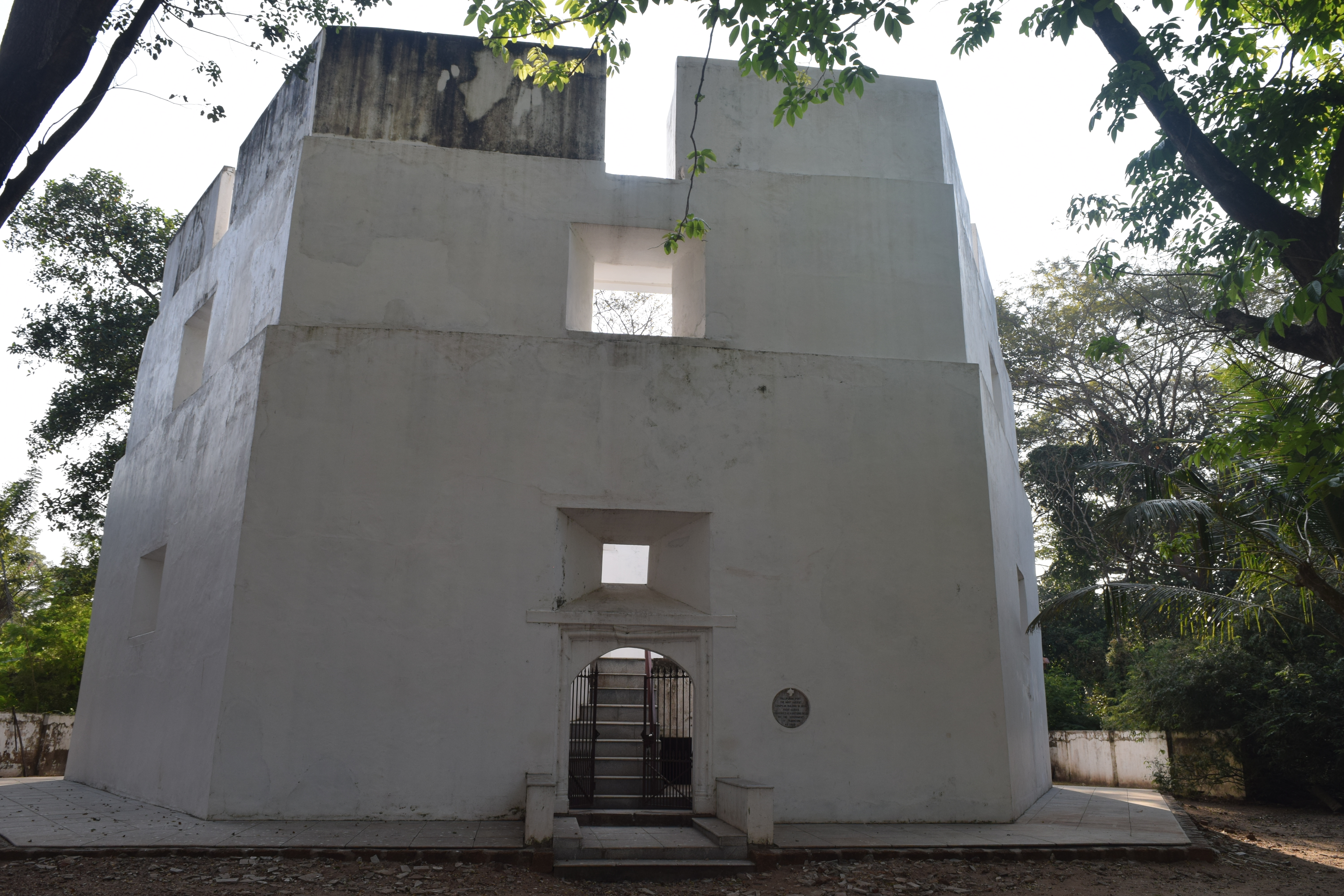
- Ruins of the Portuguese fort in Vyppin

Site information
- Type: Island fort
- Owner: Government of Kerala
- Controlled by: Portugal (1503-1661); Netherlands (1661-1789); Travancore (1789-1858); India: Travancore (1858-1947); India (1947-)
- Open to the public: Yes
- Condition: Structure

Location
- Shown within Kerala
- Location within Kerala
- Coordinates: 10.170°N 76.180°E

Site history
- Built: 27 September 1503
- Materials: Stone

Pallippuram Fort or (Paleport Castelo em Cima) is a fort in Pallippuram, Vyppin, Ernakulam district of Kerala, south India. It was built by Portuguese sailors on 27 September, 1503 using just timber wood, and later renovated in 1505 by replacing timber structure with stone. It is the oldest existing European fort in India. The Dutch captured the fort in 1663 and sold it to the Kingdom of Travancore in 1789. The fort is situated in the northern extremity of Vypeen island and is hexagonal in shape, a form popularly known as ayikkotta or alikotta.

== History ==
Pallippuram Fort was constructed by the Portuguese on 27 September 1503, initially in timber and rebuilt in stone by 1505. It holds the distinction of being the oldest extant European fort in India. The Dutch captured the fort in 1661/1663, later selling it to the Kingdom of Travancore in 1789. It remained under Travancore's control until Indian independence. Pallipuram fort was declared as a protected monument by the Department of Archeology in 1964.

Pallipuram derives its name from the nearby Basilica of Our Lady of Snows, Pallippuram ("Palli" meaning church in Malayalam), built by the Portuguese alongside the fort. According to legend, a miraculous mist once concealed the church from Tipu Sultan's attack, inspiring its dedication to the Lady of Snow.

== Architecture ==
The Pallipuram fort is three-storey high and has a hexagonal plan, with walls five feet above ground and built from laterite, chunam, granite, and wood; each face measures approx. 32 ft long × 34 ft high, with walls up to six feet thick. Each of the six facades includes three cannon embrasures. The fort features a stone doorway made of Laterite blocks, granite, and wood, with walls of laterite, a granite central pillar, and a wooden upper storey. It includes a 4 feet in height and 7 feet square cellar likely used for storing gunpowder, 18 former embrasures for cannons, and remnants of both old and modern chapels nearby. The Manjumatha church was built on the south side of the fort, both the fort and church are in Portuguese architectural style.

== Gallery ==
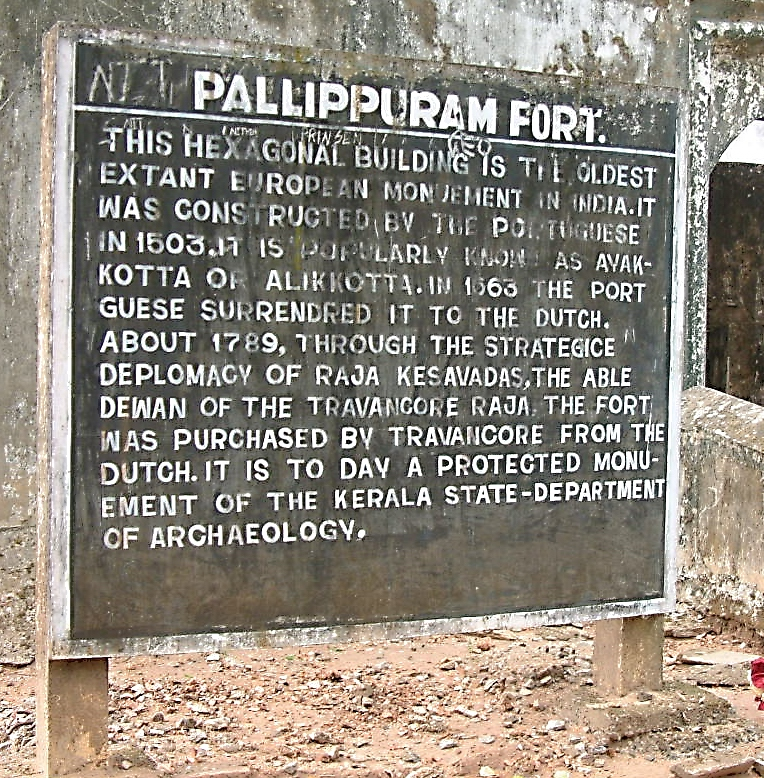
Information board

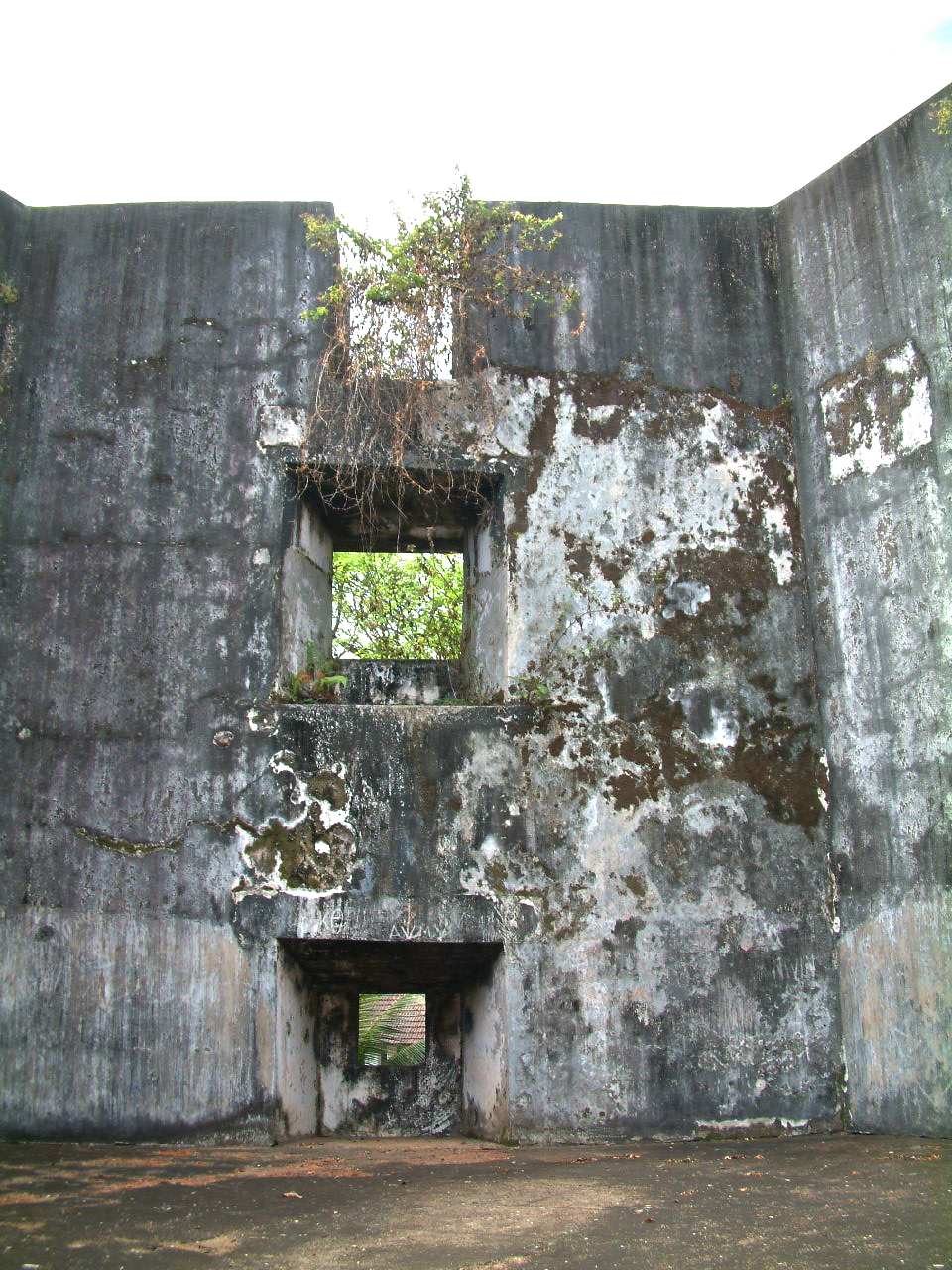
Inner area of ayakotta

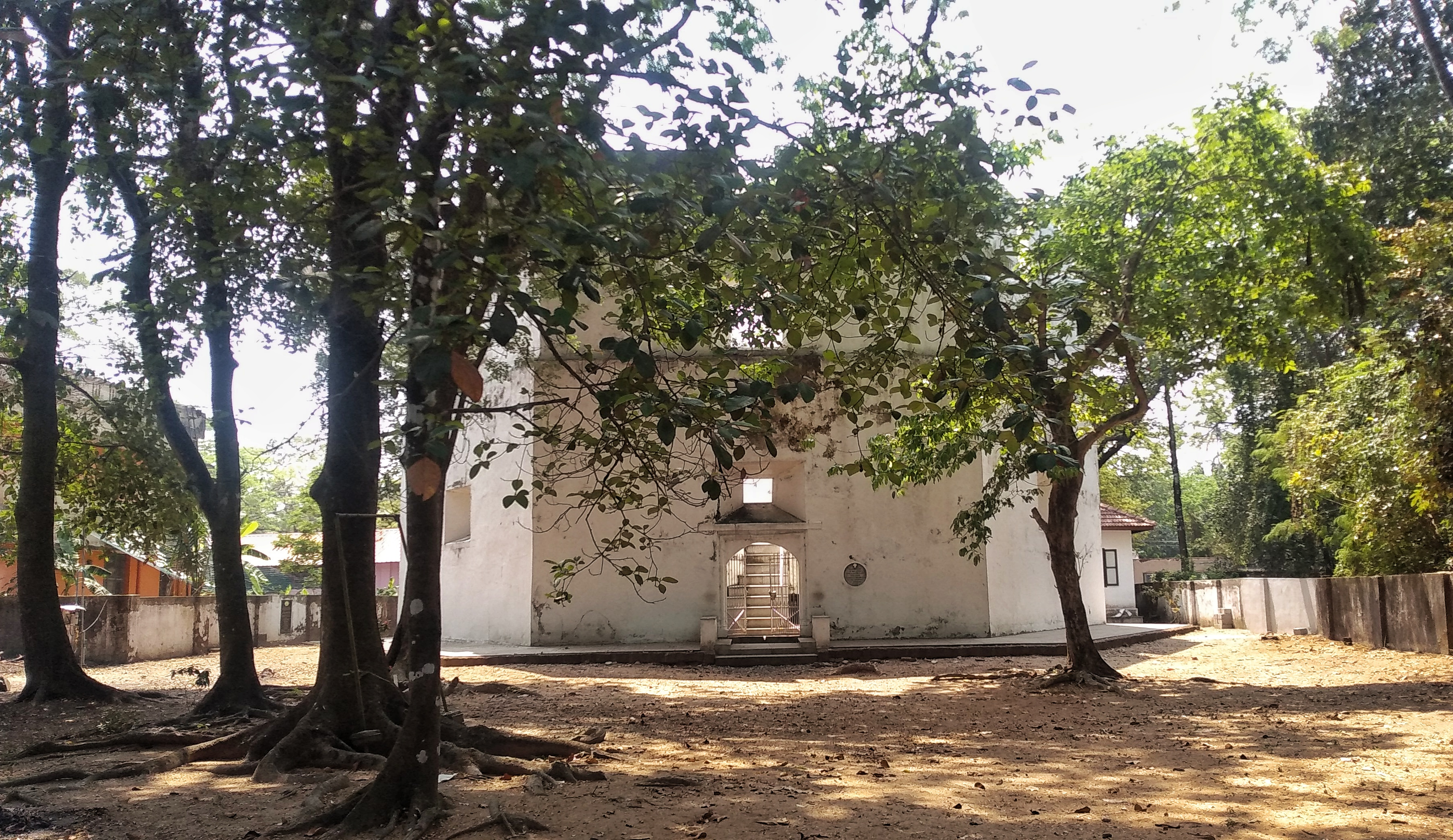
Ruins of the Fort(Wide View)

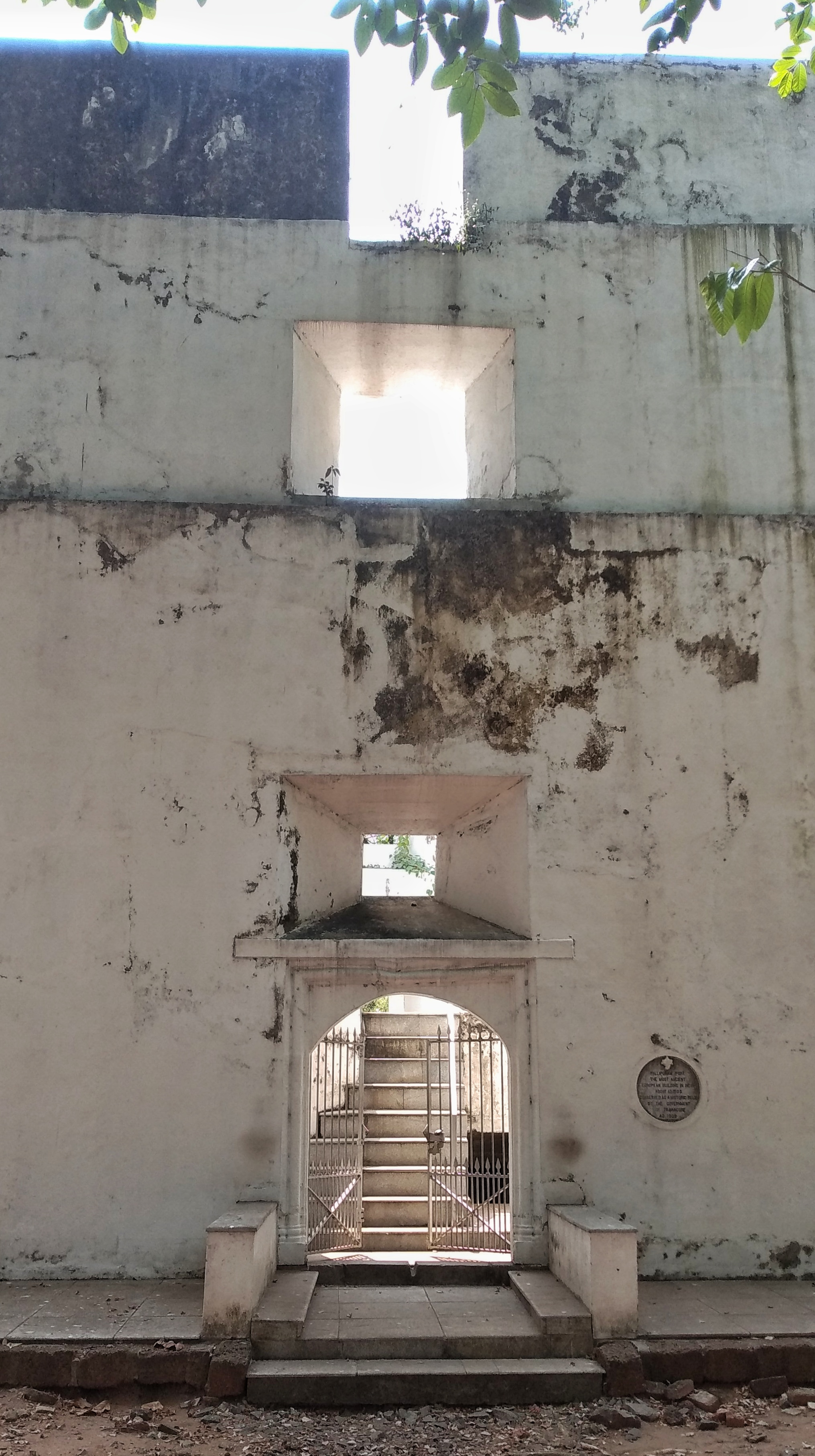
Entrance

Plaque in Pallipuram Fort
