= Tony Chammany =

Indian politician (born 1969)

Member of the Kerala Legislative Assembly
- Incumbent
- Assumed office 21 May 2026
- Preceded by: K. N. Unnikrishnan
- Constituency: Vypen

Personal details
- Born: Tony Chammany; 1969 (age 56–57) Kochi, Ernakulam district, Kerala, India
- Party: Indian National Congress
- Parent: Thomas (father)
- Education: Graduate
- Occupation: Politician, Social Worker

Tony Chammany (born 1969) is an Indian politician serving as the member of the legislative assembly (MLA) for the Vypen constituency in the Kerala Legislative Assembly. A leader of the Indian National Congress, he was elected in the 2026 Kerala Legislative Assembly election, wresting the seat from the LDF. He previously served as the mayor of the Kochi Municipal Corporation from 2010 to 2015.

== Early life and education ==
Tony Chammany was born to Thomas in Kochi, Ernakulam district In a Latin Catholic Family. He has been a long-time political activist, rising through the ranks of the Kerala Students Union (KSU) and the Indian Youth Congress. He is a graduate and has been a prominent face of the Congress party in Kochi's urban and coastal politics for over two decades.

== Political career ==
Chammany's political career is highlighted by his tenure as the mayor of Kochi (2010–2015), during which he oversaw significant infrastructure projects, including the initial phases of the Kochi Metro. After a narrow defeat in the 2021 Kerala Legislative Assembly election in the Kochi constituency, he continued his organizational work within the party.

In the 2026 Kerala Assembly elections, he was fielded from the Vypen constituency. In a result that marked a major gain for the UDF in Ernakulam district, Chammany polled 66,112 votes, defeating his nearest rival, Adv. M. B. Shyni of the Communist Party of India (Marxist), by a margin of 15,648 votes.

== Election results ==
=== 2026 Kerala Legislative Assembly election ===
Party	Candidate	Votes	%	±%	
	INC	Tony Chammany	66,112	49.52	+15.22
	CPI(M)	Adv. M. B. Shyni	50,464	37.80	-11.04
	Twenty20	Anitha Thomas	14,210	10.64	-
	AAP	Mohandas	1,220	0.91	-
Margin of victory		15,648	11.72		
Total valid votes		1,33,512			
INC gain from CPI(M)		Swing	+13.13		
