= Achuthanandan ministry =

2006–2011 government of Kerala, India

Achuthanandan Ministry
- 20th Cabinet of Kerala
- 2006-2011
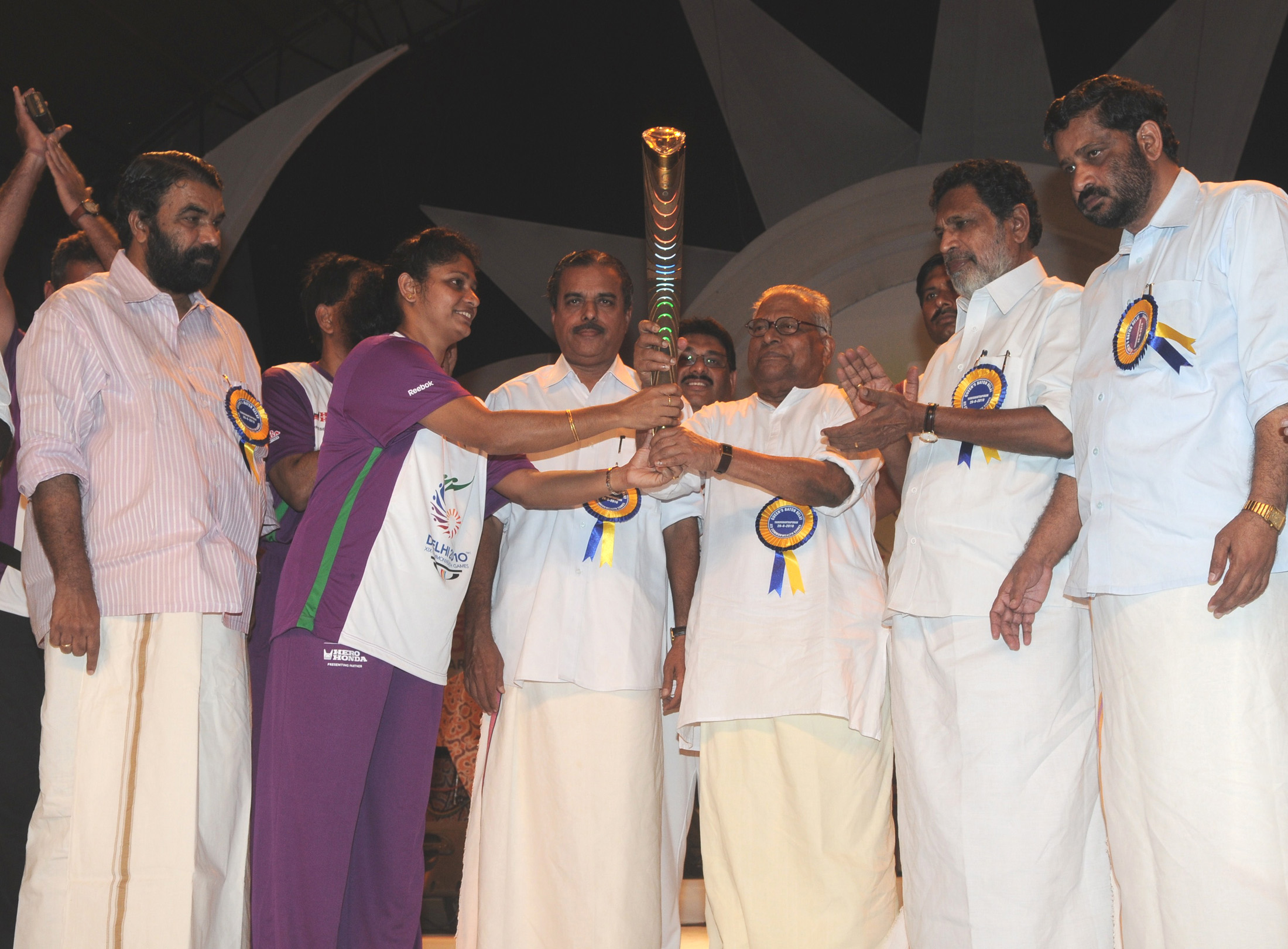
- K. M. Beenamol hands over the Queen’s Baton to V. S. Achuthanandan with presence of other ministers in 2010.
- Date formed: 18 May 2006
- Date dissolved: 14 May 2011

People and organisations
- Head of government: V. S. Achuthanandan
- Member parties: LDF
- Status in legislature: Majority
- Opposition party: UDF
- Opposition leader: Oommen Chandy

History
- Election: 2006 election
- Predecessor: First Oommen ministry
- Successor: Second Oommen ministry

The V. S. Achuthanandan ministry was a Kerala government ministry formed on 18 May 2006 by V. S. Achuthanandan, after the victory of the Left Democratic Front (LDF) coalition in the 2006 Kerala Legislative Assembly election. It was dissolved on 16 May 2011, after the chief minister resigned on 14 May 2011, following the LDF's defeat in the 2011 Kerala Legislative Assembly election. The V.S. government had twenty ministers.

== Ministers ==
	Minister	Ministry
1	V. S. Achuthanandan	Chief Minister
2	K. P. Rajendran	Minister for Revenue
3	Kodiyeri Balakrishnan	Minister for Home Affairs and Minister for Tourism
4	Thomas Isaac	Minister for Finance
5	Elamaram Kareem	Minister for Industries & Commerce
6	Mullakkara Ratnakaran	Minister for Agriculture
7	G. Sudhakaran	Minister for Co-operation & Coir
8	Kadannapalli Ramachandran	Minister for Devaswom
9	P. K. Gurudasan	Minister for Labour and Employment, Excise
10	N. K. Premachandran	Minister for Water Resources
11	Jose Thettayil	Minister for Transport
12	C. Divakaran	Minister for Food & Civil Supplies, Animal husbandry and Dairy development
13	A. K. Balan	Minister for Welfare of Backward & Scheduled Communities, Electricity
14	Binoy Viswam	Minister for Forests and Housing
15	M. A. Baby	Minister for Education and Culture
16	Paloli Mohammed Kutty	Minister for Local Self Government
17	M. Vijayakumar	Minister for Law, Sports, Public works and Parliamentary affairs
18	S. Sarma	Minister for Fisheries
19	P. K. Sreemathy	Minister for Health and Family Welfare
20	V.Surendran Pillai	Minister for Port & Youth welfare

== Ex-ministers ==
Four ministers relinquished office during the tenure of the government:

- P. J. Joseph, Minister for Public Works (Resigned on 04-09-2006 after Airline Travel scam, returned on 17-08-2009 after acquittal, and again resigned on 30-04-2010, after his controversial merger of Kerala Congress (J), his party, with Kerala Congress (M), led by K. M. Mani)
- Mons Joseph, Minister for Public Works (Took office on 18-10-2007, after the resignation of T. U. Kuruvila, and resigned on 16-08-2009 for welcoming P. J. Joseph)
- T. U. Kuruvilla, Minister for Public Works (Took office on 15-09-2006, after the resignation of P. J. Joseph, and resigned on 04-09-2007 after Rajakumari land scam)
- Mathew T. Thomas, Minister for Transport (Resigned on 16-03-2009, as a part of internal arrangements of their party to pave way for Jose Thettayil)

== See also ==
- Chief Minister of Kerala
- List of chief ministers of Kerala
- List of Kerala ministers
