= Edakochi =

District of Kochi, India

- Ward
- Location in Kerala, India Edakochi (India) Edakochi (Kochi)
- Coordinates: 9.92°N 76.29°E
- Country: India
- State: Kerala
- District: Ernakulam

Languages
  - Official: Malayalam, English
- Time zone: UTC+5:30 (IST)
- PIN: 682010
- Telephone code: 0484
- Vehicle registration: KL-43
- Nearest city: Kochi

Edakochi is a region in southern Kochi, India. It borders Palluruthy to the northwest and is separated from Aroor to the south and Kumbalam to the east by the Kerala backwaters. It is adjacent to the Kumbalangi tourism village that connects through Perumpadappu.

== Bridges and roads ==
The Edakochi Kannangattu Bridge links Kannangattu to the Indian Maritime University junction on National Highway 966B. It was constructed by the Kerala Public Works Department.

The Edakochi Kannangattu-Willingdon Island Bridge was opened to the public in September 2017 by then-Minister of Works, G. Sudhakaran, bringing the city closer to the Thevara and Kundanoor regions.

== Buildings ==
Edakochi is home to the proposed site for the Kerala Cricket Association Stadium. It will be located 15 km (9.3 mi) from the South Railway Station, 18 km (11 mi) from the North Railway Station, and 22 km (14 mi) from Kaloor.

Edakochi's St. Lawrence's Church has gained fame as the burial place of the priest Lawrence Puliyanath. The first church in Edakochi is believed to have been built around the time of the departure of the Saint Thomas Christians from Cranganore. At that time, Cranganore had three important centres: Mattancherry, Mundamveli, and Edakochi. There seems to have been a church at Edakochi since the 9th century, as there were at Mattancherry and Mundamveli. This ancient church was dedicated to "The Three Kings".

== Schools and libraries ==
Schools and libraries in Edakochi include:

- Edakochi Govt. High School
- St. Lawrence UP School
- St. Mary's LP School
- Jnanodayam Public School
- Santhi Vidyalaya College
- Aquinas College, Edacochin
- Siena College of Professional Studies
- Avila College of Education
- Pandit Karuppan Memorial Public Library and Reading Room
