= Sree Balakrishna Swami Temple, Kuzhuppilly =

Hindu temple in Kerala, India

- Location in Kerala

Religion
- Affiliation: Hinduism
- District: Ernakulam
- Deity: Balakrishna

Location
- Location: Kuzhuppilly
- State: Kerala
- Country: India
- Interactive map of Sree Balakrishna Swami Temple, Kuzhuppilly
- Coordinates: 10.1107°N 76.2020°E

Specifications
- Temple: One
- Elevation: 27.24 m (89 ft)

The Sree Balakrishna Swamy Temple, Kuzhuppilly of Goud Saraswat Brahmin (G.S.B.) community is in Kuzhuppilly village, Vypeen Island, Ernakulam district, Kerala, India. The temple in the present form was completed in 1964 A.D.

== Other deities and Sub-temples ==
There are sub-temples for Hanuman, Garuda, Ganapathy, Laxmi, Navagraha and Nagaraja.

== History ==
During the exodus of Goud Saraswat Brahmins from Goa in the 16th century, many families settled down in and around Cochin. A prominent person among them (Venkateswara Pai alias Vensu Pai) settled in Kuzhupilly in the land given by the Raja of Cochin. Vensu Pai's son Anatha Pai once on his pilgrimage to Tirupathi, purchased some metal idols and dolls for his kids. There was an idol of Balakrishna among them. The children used them in their play and made pooja to these idols. However, the children started to become sick regularly and used to have many health complaints. The elders considered that, it was due to not keeping the idol in sacred form, and started pooja. But the pooja was neither regular nor as per sastra. The suffering of the children continued and also there were some child deaths in the family. The worried Anantha Pai approached a known Astrologer Sri Adoor Chakrapani for a solution. The astrological prasnam and prediction revealed that a separate temple is to be built for the Balakrishna idol and regular poojas to be conducted. Sri Anantha Pai considered Balakrishna as his child and divided his properties among his children and Balakrishna. A small temple was constructed in the land given to Balakrishna and Prathista done in 1895 AD.

Over the period, there were internal conflicts in the family of Vensu Pai and the rituals in the temple suffered. The number of GSB families in the area also increased. It was felt that the community should have a common place for worship. Accordingly, the Balakrishna temple was offered to the community and the management was vested with the community in common. However, the Vensu Pai family was given a special status in the affairs of the temple. The samaj members proposed to construct a new temple in a more convenient location.

About one and half acres of land was given free by A. Govinda Shenoy and the work was started. But the progress was in snail's pace due to non-cooperation and lack of initiative among the members. It remained incomplete for more than 35 years.

Later, a group of youth formed a Seva Samithi and took the lead. They completed the work of Garbhagraha through free service and the Murti was shifted to this new temple in 1964 AD facing east. The improvements in the temple was a continuous effort. In the late eighties, the Aanapandal was constructed with decorated pillars. The committee members also took up construction of a shopping complex and Kalyana mandapam. There are extensive paintings of Daśāvatāra on the temple walls inside. The Dhvaja pratishta was done on 18-1-1991. The Centenary of the pratishta was celebrated in 1995 A.D.

== See also ==
- Temples of Kerala
