= Pallippuram =

Pallippuram may refer to the following places in the state of Kerala, in India:

- Pallippuram, Alappuzha
- Pallippuram, Ernakulam
- Pallippuram, Palakkad
- Pallippuram, Thiruvananthapuram
