= C. K. Manisankar =

Indian politician

C. K. Manisankar was the 16th deputy mayor of the Kochi Corporation in the Indian port city of Kochi, during the tenure of the first female mayor, Mercy Williams. Manisankar had joined the organization in 1988 and served between 2005 and 2'010. He was elected via an open ballot.

Manisankar studied at Thripphunithura Sanskrit High School, where he was a student leader. He was district secretary of the Democratic Youth Federation of India. In 1988 he joined the Kochi Municipal Corporation where he held several positions before he was appointed in 2005 as Deputy Mayor. After leaving the corporation, Manisankar became vice-president of the Centre of Indian Trade Unions in Kerala and was a senior leader in the Communist Party of India.
