= S. Sharma =

Indian politician

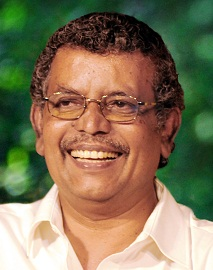

Pro-term Speaker of Kerala Legislative Assembly

Minister for Fisheries, Kerala
- In office 2006–2011
- Preceded by: Dominic Presentation
- Succeeded by: K. Babu

Minister for Electricity and Co-operation, Kerala
- In office 25 October 1998 – 13 May 2001
- Preceded by: Pinarayi Vijayan
- Succeeded by: Kadavoor Sivadasan and M.V. Raghavan

Member of Kerala Assembly
- In office 2011–2021
- Preceded by: Constituency established
- Succeeded by: K. N. Unnikrishnan
- Constituency: Vypen
- In office 2006–2011
- Preceded by: M A Chndrasekharan
- Succeeded by: Constituency abolished
- Constituency: Vadakkekara
- In office 1987–2001
- Preceded by: T K Abdu
- Succeeded by: M A Chndrasekharan
- Constituency: Vadakkekara

Personal details
- Born: 22 June 1955 (age 71) Ernakulam district, Kerala, India
- Party: Communist Party of India (Marxist)
- Spouse: Asha

Sekharan Sharma (born 24 October 1954) is an Indian politician who belongs to the Communist Party of India (Marxist). He is a former minister for fisheries, registration and harbour engineering, and electricity and co-operation in the Government of Kerala and a member of Kerala State Committee of Communist Party of India (Marxist). He represents the Vypeen constituency in the Kerala Legislative Assembly. He has served as the chairman of Kochi Smart City and has been on the board of Cochin International Airport.

== Career ==
Sharma was born on 22 June 1955 in Ernakulam district to Sekharan and his wife. He is named after an unknown communist leader from North India; he does not belong to a community that typically uses the surname Sharma. He entered politics through Students' Federation of India and Democratic Youth Federation of India. During his political career, he has served at different times as a member of Ernakulam district committee of CPI (M) (1985), Ernakulam district secretary of DYFI, State President of DYFI (1986), and Central Committee Member of DYFI. He is currently a member of the State Committee of CPI(M).

Sharma was elected to Kerala Legislative Assembly in 1987, 1991 and 1996, 2006, 2011 and 2016 and served as minister for electricity and co-operation in the Third E. K. Nayanar ministry from October 1998 to May 2001. He was the minister for fisheries and harbour engineering and registration in the V. S. Achuthanandan ministry throughout its period. In 2016, he acted as the Pro tem Speaker of the 14th Kerala Assembly. He also chaired the Public Undertakings Committee from 1996 to 1998.
