= M. Swaraj =

Indian politician (born 1979)

Comrade Adv. M. Swaraj
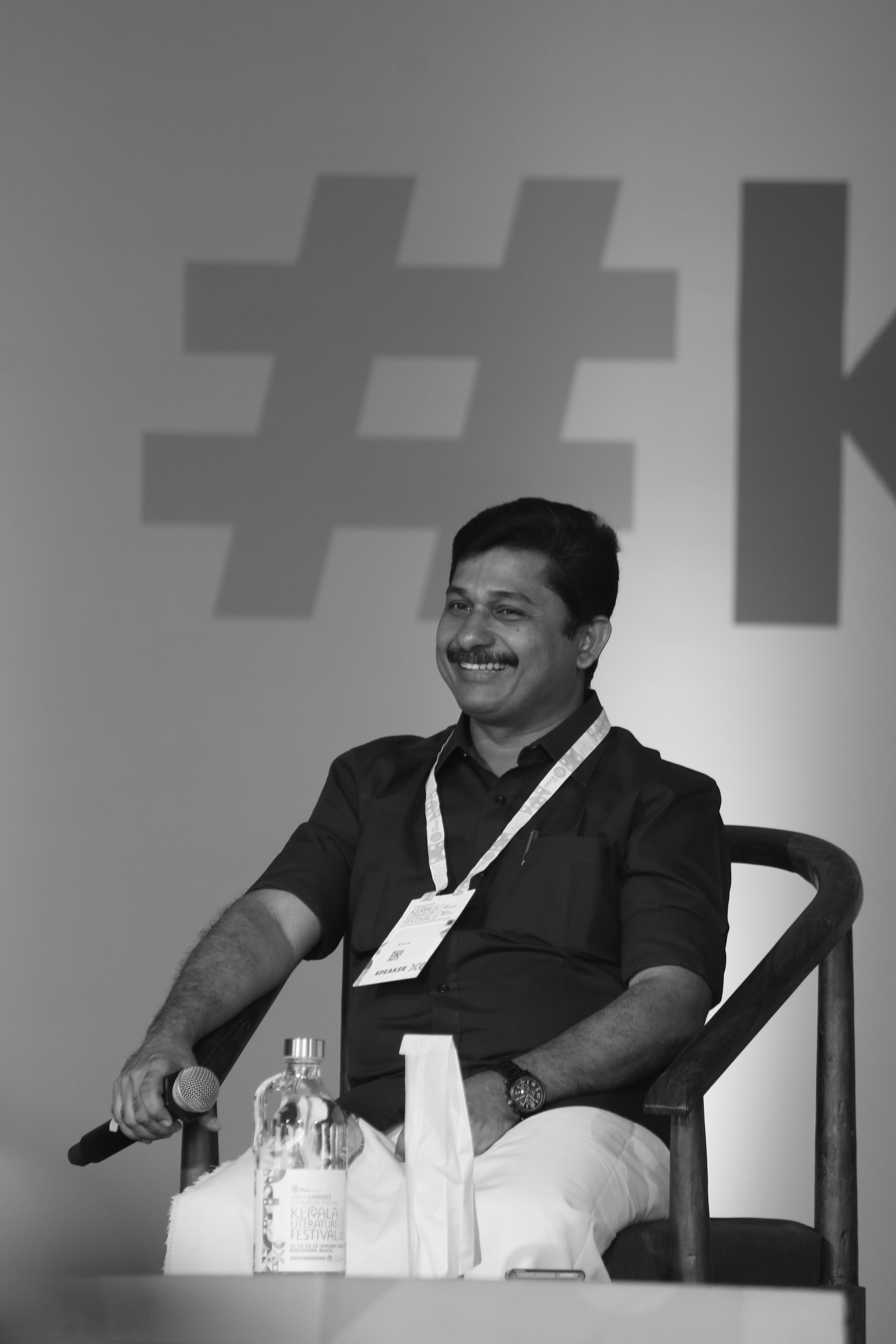

Member of the Kerala Legislative Assembly for Thrippunithura
- In office 2 June 2016 – 2 May 2021
- Preceded by: K. Babu
- Succeeded by: K. Babu

Personal details
- Born: 27 May 1979 (age 47) Nilambur, Malappuram district, Kerala
- Party: CPI(M)
- Spouse: Saritha

Muraleedharan Swaraj (born 1979) is an Indian politician of the Communist Party of India (Marxist) and a former representative of Thrippunithura constituency in the Kerala Legislative Assembly. He is also a former Kerala State Secretary of Students' Federation of India and Democratic Youth Federation of India.

== Early life ==
Swaraj was born at Pathar in the Nilambur taluk of Malappuram district to P. N. Muraleedharan and Sumangi Amma. He attended Sree Vivekananda School, Edakkara. He then completed his B.A. degree in Economics from Mar Thoma College, Chungathara. He later pursued an LL.B. degree from Kerala Law Academy, Thiruvananthapuram, and a master's degree from Annamalai University.

== Political career ==
Swaraj entered politics through student activism. He was the Chairman of the Calicut University Students' Union in 1999 and rose to be the Secretary of SFI the Kerala State Committee in 2005. Later he became active in DYFI, the youth wing of CPI(M), and was made President of its Kerala Unit in 2011. He was elected to Kerala Legislative Assembly from Thripunithura assembly constituency in 2016 Kerala Legislative Assembly election by defeating Congress veteran K. Babu by a margin of 4,467 votes. But in the 2021 elections, Swaraj lost to K. Babu by a margin of 992 votes. Later, he contested in the by elections from Nilambur constituency (his hometown) in 2025, in which he lost to Aryadan Shoukath by a margin of 11,077 votes.

Kerala Legislative Assembly Election
Year	Constituency	Closest Rival	Majority (Votes)	Won/Lost
2016	Thripunithura	K. Babu (INC)	4467	Won
2021	Thripunithura	K. Babu (INC)	992	Lost
2025	Nilambur	Aryadan Shoukath (INC)	11077	Lost

== No Award Stance ==
Swaraj had won the Sibi Kumar Endowment Award (2024) by Kerala Sahitya Akademi in the essay category for his book ‘Pookkalude Pusthakam’. He declined the award stating his long standing personal stance, through a Facebook post, of not accepting an award.
