= Mercy Williams =

Indian politician

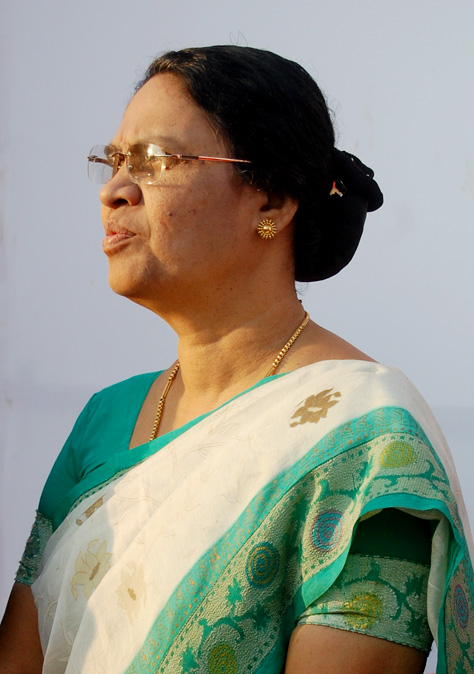
- Born: 1947; Kochi, Kerala
- Died: 19 November 2014 (aged 66–67); Kochi, Kerala
- Occupations: Teacher and politician
- Spouse: T.J. Williams
- Children: 1 son

Mercy Williams (Malayalam: മേഴ്സി വില്ല്യംസ്; c. 1947 – 19 November 2014), a teacher turned politician, was the 16th Mayor of Kochi, Kerala, and the first woman to hold that position in Kochi. A member of the Left Democratic Front, she was elected via an open ballot over opposing United Democratic Front candidate Winnie Abraham by a ratio of 47 to 23 votes among Kochi corporation council members. On the council, Williams represented the municipal corporation's 36th division (Kunnumpuram).

== Biography ==
Mercy graduated with a Master of Arts (MA) in Sociology from the St. Teresa's College of the University of Kerala with distinction as first rank holder and gold medallist. She also did a doctoral research paper on the "Renaissance of Kochi City". Mercy worked in the St. Teresa's College, initially as lecturer and headed the Sociology department at retirement in 2005. She was married to T.J. Williams and has a son, Anoop Joachim.

After Mercy retired from her teaching career, the same year she entered politics and contested elections to represent as a civic council member to the Kunnumpuram division of the City Municipal Corporation of Kochi. She contested the election as an independent candidate but with the support of the Communist Party of India {Marxists) (CPI (M)} whose candidate C.K. Manisankar was elected Deputy Mayor. After winning the council elections Williams was elected by the council members as the 16th Mayor of the Council, the first woman mayor of the city; she was elected by a margin of 48 votes in favour and 23 against her. She remained the first citizen of the city from 2005 to 2010. Her teaching of urban sociology and urban planning, and her doctoral research work provided her confidence to conduct the functions of the mayor of the city smoothly. She, during her tenure as mayor, made it a point to attend all meetings held by the Union Urban Development Ministry on projects under the Jawaharlal Nehru National Urban Renewal Mission (JNNURM). As mayor she performed her tasks efficiently and ensured that the city which was known for its garbage dumps when she took charge was declared and awarded as the cleanest city in India before the end of her tenure. She enacted bylaws for the city's waste management system, the first of its kind in Kerala. She adopted a decentralized waste segregation (by issuing buckets to every house) system for the city. By her persevering approach she was able to mobilize funds to the extent of Rs 900 crores for city development including funds from the Asian Development Bank and the JNNURM.

She died of cancer at the age of 67. She was buried in the St John The Baptist Church in Palarivattom on 20 November 2014.
