= Kochi Municipal Corporation =

Local civic body in Kochi, Kerala, India

- Logo of Kochi Municipal Corporation

Type
- Type: Municipal Corporation
- Term limits: 5 years

History
- Founded: 1967; 59 years ago

Leadership
- Mayor: Adv.Minimol V K, INC
- Deputy Mayor: V.R. Sudheer, INC
- Municipal Corporation Secretary: P.S.Shibu

Structure
- Seats: 76
- Political groups: Government (48) UDF (48): INC (42); IUML (3); KEC (1); IND (2); Official Opposition (20); LDF (20): CPI(M) (17); CPI (2); CON(S) (1); Other Opposition (9): BJP (6); IND (2)
- Committees: 8: Development standing committee; Education & Sports standing committee; Finance standing committee; Health standing committee; Public works standing committee; Tax appeal standing committee; Town planning standing committee; Welfare standing committee

Elections
- Last election: 9 December 2025
- Next election: December 2030

Meeting place
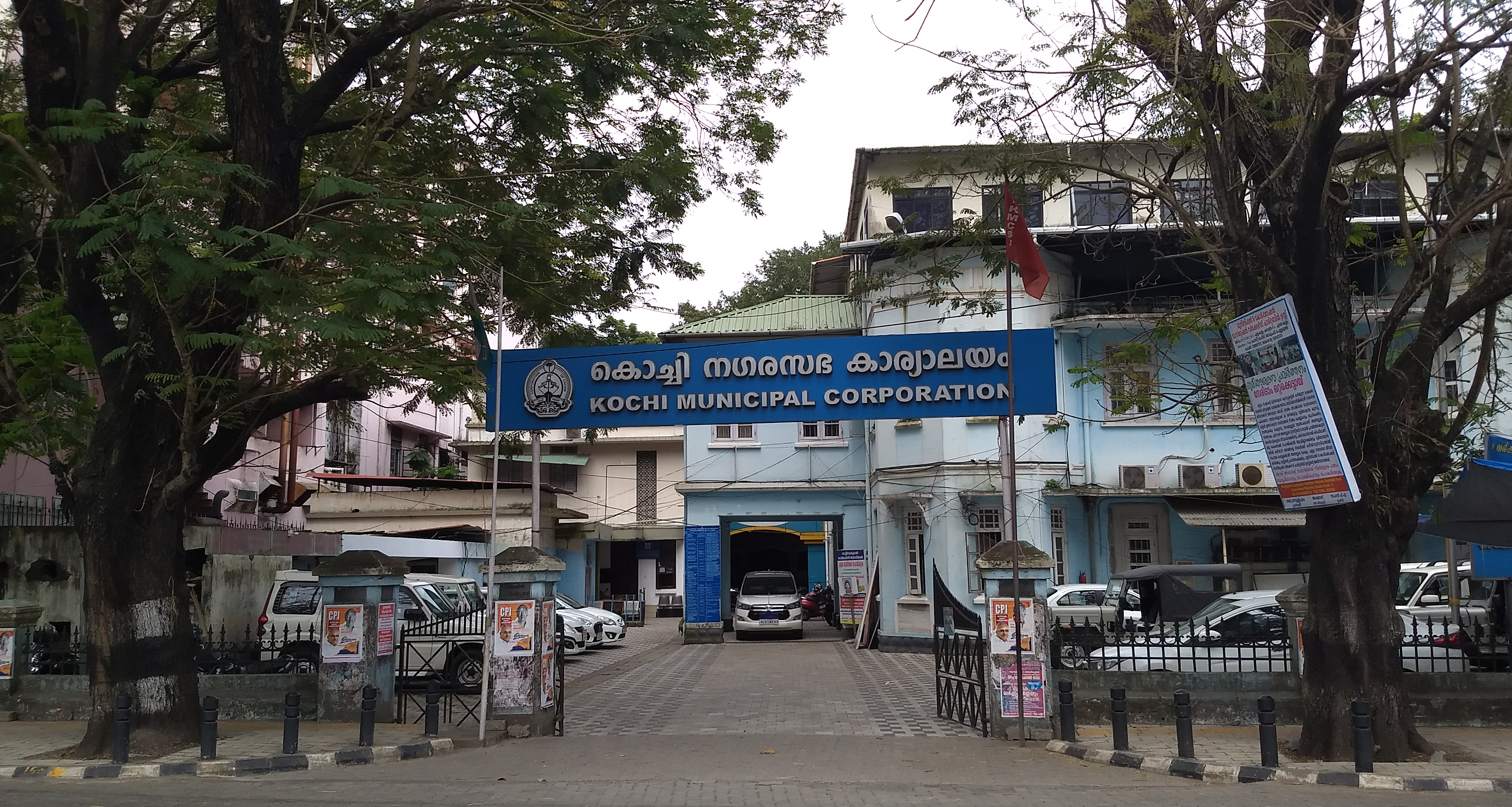
- Old Corporation Office at Park Avenue, Ernakulam

Website
- kochicorporation.lsgkerala.gov.in

The Kochi Municipal Corporation is the municipal corporation that governs the Indian city of Kochi in the state of Kerala. The Corporation manages 94.88 km^{2} of Kochi city and has a population of 677,381 within that area. It is the most densely populated city corporation in the state. Kochi Municipal Corporation has been formed with functions to improve the infrastructure of town.

== History ==
The port at Kozhikode held superior economic and political position in medieval Kerala coast, while Kannur, Kollam, and Kochi, were commercially important secondary ports, where the traders from various parts of the world would gather. The arrival of the Portuguese at Kappad, Kozhikode in 1498, during the Age of Discovery, opened a direct sea route from Europe to India. However with the arrival of Portuguese, the power of Zamorin began to decline and Kochi began to emerge as the largest port city on the coast.

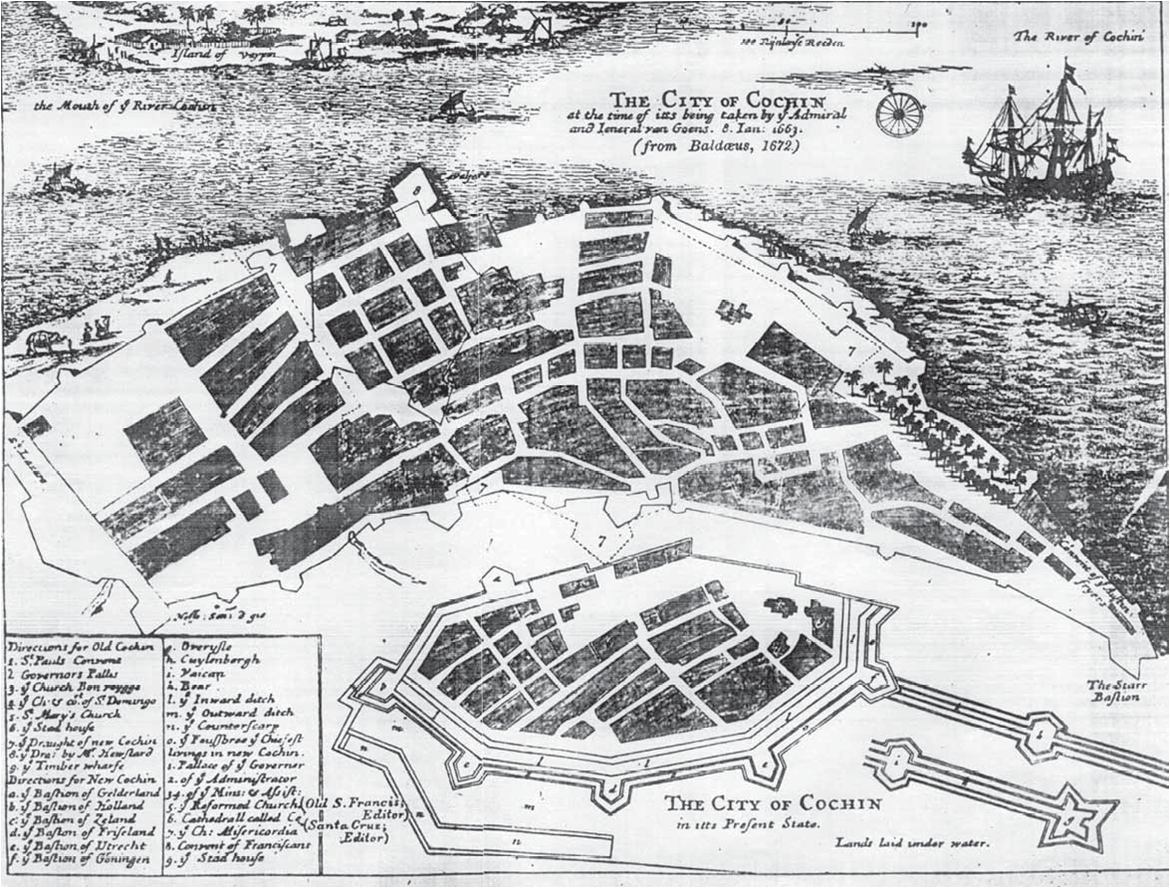
The map of Fort Kochi Municipality under the Dutch rule with Fort Stormburg (Kochi Fort)

The Fort Kochi had its first municipality established under Dutch influence on 18 April 1664 which was limited within Dutch occupied Kochi Stormburg Fort (Immanuel Fort), which was the oldest municipality in the Indian sub-continent. However, with the handing over of Kochi to the British as part of Anglo-Dutch treaty, the municipality of Fort Kochi was disbanded and much of the local administration were then carried out by Pandara officials (Revenue department of Cochin Kingdom). The Ernakulam town was under the direct protection of the British Resident of Kochi. A municipality under the chairmanship of British Resident was commissioned in 1823 to administer Ernakulam town. However it didn't have local representation, rather constituted by military officials of the British East India Company.

Fort Kochi, which was a part of Malabar District until 1956, was made a municipality on 1 November 1866, along with Kannur, Thalassery, Kozhikode, and Palakkad, according to the Madras Act 10 of 1865 (Amendment of the Improvements in Towns act 1850) of the British Indian Empire. Its first Municipal Council seating contest was conducted in 1883. This was first modern municipality in the region and also the first native (not under British India) municipality of the country. Much of Kochi's progress in local administration came under reign of Maharaja Rama Varma along with support of Diwan Sankunni Menon. In the year 1873, Mattancherry areas were demarcated out of Fort Kochi and a new municipal board was formed. In 1896, the Maharaja announced establishment of a municipal board for Ernakulam town, constituted by 4 members from palace, 2 members from local communities, one Englishman and 2 members from other religious minorities. The mayor was nominated by Maharaja. These were the first steps towards establishing a modern municipalities in the city.

After independence, these 3 municipalities remained and was brought under Indian laws. In 1956 the erstwhile Elamkulam Panchayat and a portion of Cheranallur Panchayat (Pachalam - Vaduthala) were amalgamated to the Ernakulam Municipality. In 1962 a portion of Palluruthy Panchayat (Mundamveli area) was amalgamated to the then Mattancherry Municipality. Edappally Panchayat was formed in 1946 and Palluruthy and Vyttila in 1953. The idea behind the formation of Kochi Municipal Corporation was first shaped in the Mattancherry Municipal Council. The Council passed a resolution requesting the Government to form Cochin Municipal Corporation amalgamating the Municipalities of Ernakulam, Mattancherry and Fort Kochi, on 9 July 1960. However, the erstwhile Fort Kochi Municipal Council was strongly opposed to this proposal.

Kerala State Assembly approved the proposal of Cochin Municipal Corporation. The Government of Kerala, as per their order G.O. (MS) 276/67/DD dt. 27/9/67, notified the formation of the Municipal Corporation of Kochi by amalgamating the three historical Municipalities of the state (Ernakulam, Mattancherry and Fort Kochi) with the Willingdon Island, four Panchayats (Palluruthy, Vennala, Vyttila and Edappally) and the small islands of Gundu Dweepu, Ramanthuruth. The new Corporation came into existence on 1 November 1967, having a total area of 83.524 km^{2}. The name of the Corporations was later changed to Kochi Municipal Corporation, to reflect the local name.

== Structure ==
New building of Kochi Municipal Corporation

The corporation is headed by a mayor. The current mayor is VK Minimol of the Indian National Congress, seconded by Deepak Joy as Deputy Mayor. Former mayors and deputy mayors include Mercy Williams and C.K. Manisankar. The city is divided into 76 administrative wards, from which the members of the corporation council are elected for a period of five years. The corporation has its central office situated in Ernakulam and has zonal offices at Fort Kochi, Mattancherry, Palluruthy, Edappally, Vaduthala and Vyttila.

For the purpose of administration, the corporation is divided into different departments, each catering to a different aspect of the city's development and welfare. The corporation secretary, appointed by the Government of Kerala, is the head of the administrative wing of the Kochi Municipal Corporation and oversees its administrative affairs. The Personal Department takes care of the general administration of the city. The various departments include that of Town Planning, Health, Engineering, Revenue, Accounts and the Council Section. The corporation has a Janasevanakendram (meaning centre for people's service), that addresses the issues of the public. The corporation also operates eight maternity and child welfare centers in the city.

=== Wards ===
After the ward delimitation in 2025, the number of wards in Kochi Municipal Corporation increased from 74 to 76.

== Office holders ==
Kochi Municipal Corporation — Office Holders (2025–2030)
Office	Name	Notes
Mayor	V. K. Minimol (INC)	Elected Mayor; serving first half of term after 2025 council elections; Councillor from Palarivattom division
Deputy Mayor	V.R. Sudheer (INC)	Elected Deputy Mayor; Elected after resignation of incumbent Deputy Mayor Deepak Joy.
Chairperson, Finance Standing Committee	V.R. Sudheer	Deputy mayor Ex officio
Chairperson, Development Standing Committee	Shakrutha (INC)	
Chairperson, Welfare Standing Committee	Antony Painuthara (INC)	
Chairperson, Health Standing Committee	Seena Teacher (INC)	
Public Works Standing Committee	Ashraf T. K. (IUML)	
Town Planning Standing Committee	Adv. P.M. Naseema (INC)	
Tax Appeal Standing Committee	K.A. Manaf (INC)	
Education & Sports Standing Committee	Jismi Gerald (INC)	
Corporation Secretary	P.S. Shibu	Official appointed by the Government of Kerala.

=== Executive Officers ===
Kochi Municipal Corporation Leadership
Position	Name	Division	Party	Alliance
Mayor	Adv. Minimol V. K.	Palarivattom (33)	Indian National Congress	UDF
Deputy Mayor	Vacant		Indian National Congress	UDF

=== Current members ===
The 76 wards of the Kochi Municipal Corporation and their councillors are listed below in the serial wise order.

Assembly	Ward Details		Councillor	Party	Alliance		Remarks
Assembly	No.	Name	Councillor	Party	Alliance		Remarks
Kochi	1	Fort Kochi	Shiny Mathew	Indian National Congress		UDF	Mayor-designate (Term 2)
Kochi	2	Kalvathy	Fausia Mohammed	Indian Union Muslim League		UDF	
Kochi	3	Earavely	Rahina Rafeeq	Indian National Congress		UDF	
Kochi	4	Karippalam	Manaf K. A.	Indian National Congress		UDF	
Kochi	5	Cheralayi	Pravitha Vijayakumar	Bharatiya Janata Party		NDA	
Kochi	6	Mattanchery	Sheeja Navas	Indian Union Muslim League		UDF	
Kochi	7	Chakkamadam	Suhana Subair	Communist Party of India (Marxist)		LDF	
Kochi	8	Karuvelippady	Kavitha Harikumar	Indian National Congress		UDF	
Ernakulam	9	Island North	Padmakumari T.	Bharatiya Janata Party		NDA	
Ernakulam	10	Ravipuram	S. Sashikala	Independent			
Ernakulam	11	Ernakulam South	K. V. P. Krishnakumar	Indian National Congress		UDF	Deputy Mayor-designate (Term 2)
Ernakulam	12	Gandhi Nagar	Nirmala Teacher	Indian National Congress		UDF	
Ernakulam	13	Kathrikadavu	Riya Lawrence	Indian National Congress		UDF	
Ernakulam	14	Ernakulam Central	Sudha Dileepkumar	Bharatiya Janata Party		NDA	
Ernakulam	15	Ernakulam North	Augustine Sebastian P. M.	Indian National Congress		UDF	
Ernakulam	16	Kaloor South	Aristotle M. G.	Indian National Congress		UDF	
Thrikkakara	17	Kaloor North	Ashraf T. K.	Indian Union Muslim League		UDF	
Ernakulam	18	Thrikkanarvattom	Dr. Jalaja S. Acharya	Bharatiya Janata Party		NDA	
Ernakulam	19	Ayyappankavu	Deepak Joy	Indian National Congress		UDF	Deputy Mayor
Ernakulam	20	Pottakuzhy	Brigith Ashin	Communist Party of India		LDF	
Ernakulam	21	Elamakkara South	V. R. Sudheer	Indian National Congress		UDF	
Ernakulam	22	Pachalam	Albert Ambalathingal	Indian National Congress		UDF	
Ernakulam	23	Thattazham	Sibi John	Indian National Congress		UDF	
Ernakulam	24	Vaduthala West	Jismi Gerald	Indian National Congress		UDF	
Ernakulam	25	Vaduthala East	Henry Austin	Indian National Congress		UDF	
Ernakulam	26	Elamakkara North	Beena Mahesh	Communist Party of India (Marxist)		LDF	
Ernakulam	27	Puthukkalavattam	Seena Teacher	Indian National Congress		UDF	
Ernakulam	28	Kunnumpuram	Jagadambika	Communist Party of India (Marxist)		LDF	
Thrikkakara	29	Ponekkara	Nimmi Mariyam	Indian National Congress		UDF	
Thrikkakara	30	Edappally	Abdul Latheef	Indian National Congress		UDF	
Thrikkakara	31	Changampuzha	Sini Anand	Indian National Congress		UDF	
Thrikkakara	32	Dhevankulangara	Vijayakumar	Indian National Congress		UDF	
Thrikkakara	33	Palarivattom	Adv. Minimol V. K.	Indian National Congress		UDF	Mayor
Thrikkakara	34	Stadium	Adv. Deepthi Mary Varghese	Indian National Congress		UDF	
Thrikkakara	35	Karanakkodam	Girly Robert	Indian National Congress		UDF	
Thrikkakara	36	Puthiyaroad	Molly Charlie	Indian National Congress		UDF	
Thrikkakara	37	Padivattam	Shibi Soman	Indian National Congress		UDF	
Thrikkakara	38	Vennala	Sabu Koroth	Indian National Congress		UDF	
Thrikkakara	39	Chakkaraparambu	Adv. P. M. Naseema	Indian National Congress		UDF	
Thrikkakara	40	Chalikkavattam	Bindu Viju	Indian National Congress		UDF	
Thrikkakara	41	Thammanam	Divya Rajesh	Indian National Congress		UDF	
Thrikkakara	42	Elamkulam	Nisha P. D.	Indian National Congress		UDF	
Thrikkakara	43	Girinagar	P. D. Martin	Indian National Congress		UDF	
Thrikkakara	44	Ponnurunni	M. X. Sebastian	Indian National Congress		UDF	
Thrikkakara	45	Ponnurunni East	Beena Divakaran	Communist Party of India (Marxist)		LDF	
Thrikkakara	46	Vyttila	V. P. Chandran	Independent		UDF	UDF Independent
Thrikkakara	47	Poonithura	Xavier P. Antony	Indian National Congress		UDF	
Thrikkakara	48	Vyttila Janatha	Anju K. Thankachan	Indian National Congress		UDF	
Thrikkakara	49	Kadavanthra	Jison George	Kerala Congress		UDF	
Thrikkakara	50	Panampilly Nagar	Antony Painuthara	Indian National Congress		UDF	
Ernakulam	51	Perumanoor	K. X. Francis	Indian National Congress		UDF	
Ernakulam	52	Konthuruthy	Abhishek K. S.	Indian National Congress		UDF	
Ernakulam	53	Thevara	Elizabeth Teacher	Communist Party of India (Marxist)		LDF	
Ernakulam	54	Island South	Shakrutha	Indian National Congress		UDF	
Thrippunithura	55	Kadebhagam	Ashwathi Joshi	Communist Party of India (Marxist)		LDF	
Thrippunithura	56	Palluruthy East	N. P. Shanthini	Communist Party of India (Marxist)		LDF	
Thrippunithura	57	Thazhuppu	Sujatha Sabu	Communist Party of India (Marxist)		LDF	
Thrippunithura	58	Eadakochi North	K. J. Basil	Congress (Secular)		LDF	
Thrippunithura	59	Edakochi South	Lasitha Peter	Indian National Congress		UDF	
Thrippunithura	60	Perumbadappu	Likitha N. X.	Communist Party of India		LDF	
Thrippunithura	61	Konam	C. R. Biju	Communist Party of India (Marxist)		LDF	
Thrippunithura	62	Palluruthy Kacheripady	V. A. Sreejith	Communist Party of India (Marxist)		LDF	
Thrippunithura	63	Nambyapuram	Rashida Hussain	Communist Party of India		LDF	
Kochi	64	Palluruthy	Geetha Prabhakaran	Indian National Congress		UDF	
Kochi	65	Pullardesam	Hema Teacher	Communist Party of India		LDF	
Kochi	66	Tharebhagam	Lavitha Nelson	Communist Party of India		LDF	
Kochi	67	Thoppumpady	Joseph Sumith	Indian National Congress		UDF	
Kochi	68	Mundamvely East	K. J. Prakashan	Independent politician	OTH		
Kochi	69	Mundamvely	Lisi Sumi	Indian National Congress		UDF	
Kochi	70	Manassery	Nisha Joseph	Communist Party of India		LDF	
Kochi	71	Moolamkuzhy	Joseph Fernandes (Josykutty)	Communist Party of India		LDF	
Kochi	72	Chullickal	Bastin Babu	Independent		UDF	UDF Independent
Kochi	73	Nasrathu	Yesudas (P. J. Dasan)	Communist Party of India		LDF	
Kochi	74	Panayappilly	Aswathy Gireesh	Bharatiya Janata Party		NDA	
Kochi	75	Amaravathy	Adv. Priya Prashanth	Bharatiya Janata Party		NDA	
Kochi	76	Fortkochi Veli	Manjula Anil Kumar	Communist Party of India		LDF	

=== Ward Breakdown by Assembly Constituency ===
Assembly Constituency	Total Wards	UDF	LDF	NDA	OTH	Leading Alliance
Thrikkakara	23	22	1	0	0	UDF
Ernakulam	23	15	4	3	1	UDF
Kochi	21	10	7	3	1	UDF
Thrippunithura	9	1	8	0	0	LDF
Total	76	48	20	6	2	UDF

== Demography ==
The Kochi City has a population of 596,473 as per Indian Census 2001. Kochi witnessed a rapid population growth during the past 30 years. The average decadal growth in Kochi Corporation is 7.83% whereas the nearby municipal areas registered decadal average of 18.65%, and the adjoining panchayaths had an average decadal growth of 12.13%. The Sub-urban areas around the city is showing high rate of population growth and also fast developing trends. The literacy rate is 95.5%.

== Revenue sources ==
The following are the Income sources for the Corporation from the Central and State Government.

=== Revenue from taxes ===
Following is the Tax related revenue for the corporation.

- Property tax.
- Profession tax.
- Entertainment tax.
- Grants from Central and State Government like Goods and Services Tax.
- Advertisement tax.

=== Revenue from non-tax sources ===
Following is the Non Tax related revenue for the corporation.

- Water usage charges.
- Fees from Documentation services.
- Rent received from municipal property.
- Funds from municipal bonds.
- Fees and user charges
- Sale and hire charges

== Election history ==
=== Corporation Election 2025 ===
S.No.	Party name	Party symbol	Number of Corporators	Change	Map
1.	UDF		48	▲18	
2.	LDF		20	▼9	
3.	BJP		06	▲1	
4.	IND		02	▼8	

=== Corporation Election 2020 ===
S.No.	Party name	Party symbol	Number of Corporators	Change
1.	UDF		30	▼8
2.	LDF		29	▲6
3.	OTHERS		10	▼1
4.	BJP		05	▲3

=== 2015 Local body elections ===
Soumini Jain from the Indian National Congress served as the mayor of Kochi Corporation in 2015. On the council, Soumini represented the municipal corporation's 36th division (Elamkulam).

S.No.	Political Front/Party	Number of Corporators
1	United Democratic Front (UDF)	38
2	Left Democratic Front (LDF)	23
3	National Democratic Alliance (NDA)	02
4	Others	11

== Issues ==
One of the main issues that the Kochi Municipal Corporation faces is that much of the modern city has developed outside the official city limits which was last defined in 1967. As a result, the extended urban agglomeration grew much more than any other city of India, leaving the corporation dry in resources. As Kochi is a major industry and thriving modern port-city, it required much more strong leadership and plans, which till now never materialized. The city grew in unplanned way without any masterplan creating more problems. As most of the town-planning agencies like transport, electricity, water distribution were managed by Kerala Government, the Kochi Corporation failed in co-ordinating various agencies implementing various projects. Apart from all these, much of the infrastructural development funds for the city were given to Greater Cochin Development Authority which often creates administrative clashes and issues over implementation.

One of the major issue which the city faced earlier was waste management which aggravated in 2002, which was partially solved by commissioning of the Brahmapuram Waste Management Plant in 2008. However this was gradually converted into a dumping yard. In 2023, a major fire broke out at the Brahmapuram plant resulting in major parts of Kochi city getting engulfed in smoke.

== See also ==
- Kochi metropolitan area
