= K. Babu =

Indian politician (born 1951)

K Babu
- കെ.ബാബു
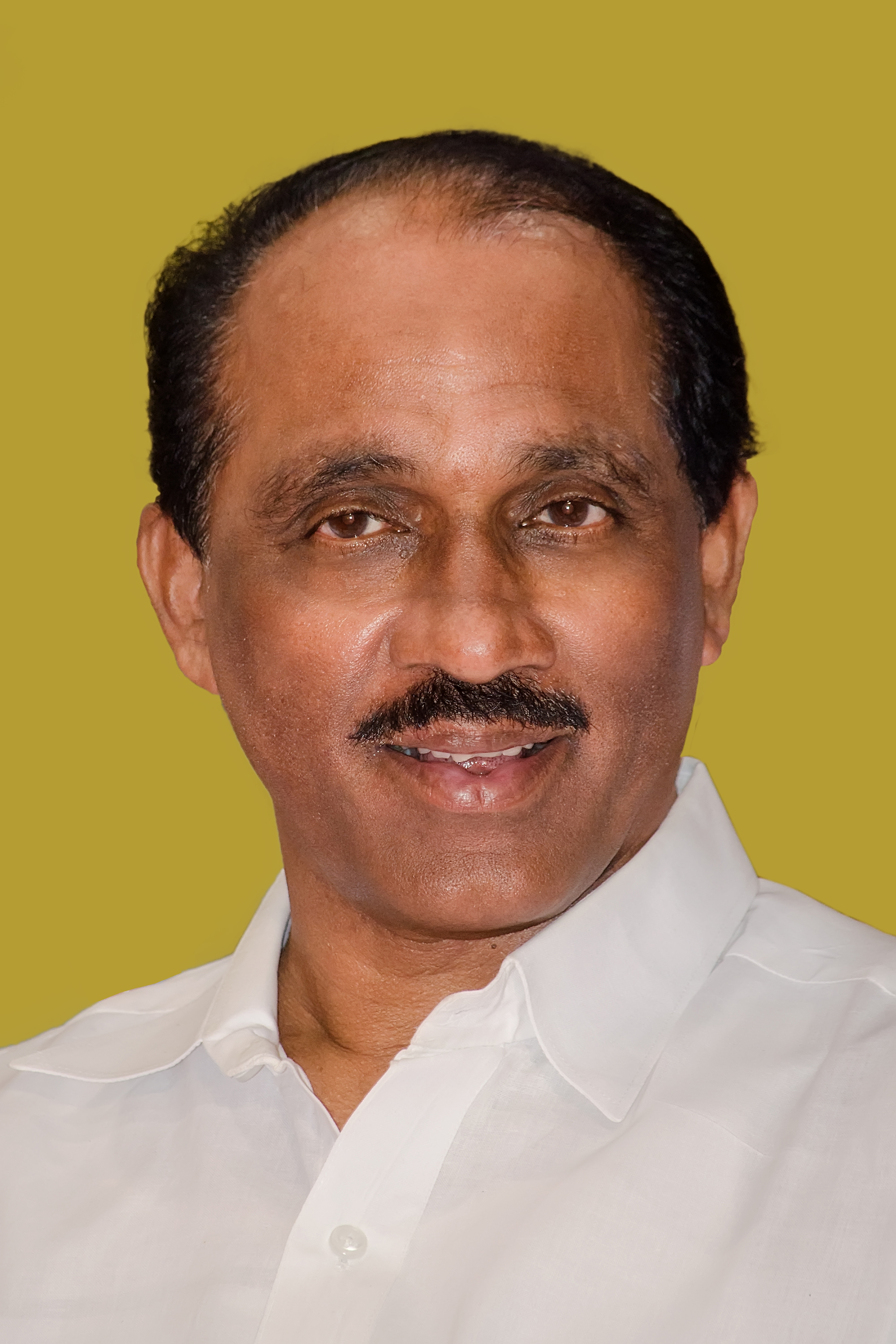

Minister for Fisheries, Ports and Excise, Government of Kerala
- In office 18 May 2011 – 23 January 2016
- Chief minister: Oommen Chandy
- Preceded by: S. Sarma (as Minister of Fisheries & Ports); P. K. Gurudasan (as Minister of Excise)
- Succeeded by: Oommen Chandy

Member of the Kerala Legislative Assembly
- In office 2 May 2021 – 21 May 2026
- Preceded by: M. Swaraj
- Succeeded by: Deepak Joy
- Constituency: Thrippunithura
- In office 1991–2016
- Succeeded by: M. Swaraj

Personal details
- Born: 2 June 1951 (age 75) Angamaly, Kochi
- Party: Indian National Congress
- Spouse: Smt. Geetha
- Children: 2 daughters
- As of 26 October, 2012 Source: kerala.gov.in

Kumaran Babu (Malayalam: കെ .ബാബു) (born 2 June 1951 in Angamaly, Cochin, Keralam, India) is an Indian politician and the former Minister for Fisheries, Ports and Excise, Government of Kerala. He was the representative of Thripunithura constituency in Kerala from 1991 to 2016 and again from 2021 to 2026.

== Early life ==
K Babu was born to K.Kumaran and Ponnamma at Angamaly, Ernakulam district of Kerala. He completed his high school life in Angamaly St. Joseph school and is a degree holder from Sree Sankara College, Kalady. Mr. Babu married Geetha, they have two daughters and live near Tripunithura, Ernakulam.

== Political life ==
Babu started his political career through the Kerala Students Union (KSU) in 1966. He was the first Chairman of Angamaly Municipal Council and the youngest Municipal Chairman then in Kerala. He served as Director, Kerala Plantation Corporation and Kerala State Consumer Federation. Was Vice-Chairman, Kerala University Union; President, Youth Congress Block Committee, Youth Congress District Committee (1977) and District Football Association, Ernakulam; General Secretary, Ernakulam District Congress Committee (1982–1991); General Secretary, I.N.T.U.C.; Office bearer of several Trade Unions in Kerala. Founder of Fine Arts Society, Angamaly. Executive Committee Member, K.P.C.C.

K. Babu was elected to the Kerala Legislative Assembly for the first time in 1991 by defeating M.M. Lawrance of CPM with a margin of 4946 votes from Tripunithura constituency. It was considered a major political change in the constituency, as Tripunithura was a known Communist (Left) bastion till then. Babu has represented Tripunithura since then in the Kerala Legislative Assembly as he was re-elected in the years 1991, 1996, 2001, 2006 and 2011.

Pinarayi Vijayan of CPM alleged that Babu had won the seat with the help of BJP votes. Babu denied those allegations and stated "The allegation against me that I won the election with BJP’s votes was a smear campaign. CPM members couldn’t accept people’s verdict and the defeat of their candidate."

Election Victories
Year	Closest rival	Majority (votes)
1991	M.M.Lawrance (CPM)	4,946
1996	Gopi Kottamurikkal(CPM)	14,773
2001	K.Chandran Pillai (CPM)	24,296
2006	K.N.Ravindranath (CPM)	7,342
2011	C.M. Dinesh Mani (CPM)	15,887
2021	M Swaraj (CPIM)	1,232

== Minister ==
K.Babu was sworn in as a minister in Kerala for the first time in 2011. He was sworn in on 18 May 2011 as the Minister for Fisheries, Ports and Excise in the Oommen Chandy Ministry 2011-2016.

Portfolios

Excise, Ports, Harbour Engineering, Fisheries, Fisheries University, Airports, Kerala Shipping and Inland Navigation Corporation

== See also ==
- Government of Kerala
- Kerala Ministers
