= LDF =

LDF may refer to:

- Leaders For Democracy Fellows Program
- NAACP Legal Defense and Educational Fund
- Lesotho Defence Force
- Liberian Development Foundation
- Liechtenstein disclosure facility
- Lietuvos Darbo Federacija, the Lithuanian Labour Federation
- Liga Dominicana de Fútbol
- Local Defence Force, former Irish Army Reserve
- Log Database File extension, for Microsoft SQL Server
- Low-density fibreboard or particle board
- London Design Festival, annual UK arts event
- London dispersion force, type of intermolecular force
- Loss development factor in insurance pricing
- Luc de Fougerolles, a Canadian soccer player
- LuraDocument Format, a LuraTech proprietary document format
- Legado Del Fantasma, a professional wrestling group
- IRS Aero (IATA code)

== Politics ==
- Left Democratic Front, Kerala
- Left Democratic Front (Maharashtra), India
