= Pulavanibham =

Historical trade festival in Palluruthy, Kerala

Palluruthy Pulavanibha Mela, shortly called as Pulavanibham, is a historical trade festival held every year since the late 1700s at Palluruthy in Ernakulam district in the Indian state of Kerala. The festival is a commemoration of Palluruthy Azhakiyakav Devi's entry into the temple as per the special proclamation of the King of Kochi in the 1700s, when the lower caste community was denied entry to the temple. Through this proclamation, the north side of the temple was opened to the Pulaya people on the last Thursday of the month of Malayalam month Dhanu in every year. At that time, lower caste people from Kochi, Malabar and Travancore used to travel for several days to reach here. They used to sell the products they made in the temple premises to pay for their travel expenses. But upper caste people called it as Pulavanibham (business by Pulayas). This objection was later accepted by the Pulayas and it is still celebrated every year on the last Thursday of the month of Dhanu.

== Origin ==
Legend is that a few kilometers away from the temple was the village of Pulayas. The village faced a smallpox epidemic and the dying villagers were directed to appease the angry goddess of Azhakiyakavu. But they could not enter the temple due to the prohibition of entry into the temple for lower caste people. The Pulayas made a plea to the then Cochin Maharaja who granted them permission to enter from the North side of the Azhakiyakav temple on the last Thursday of Malayalam month Dhanu.

For centuries, Pulavanibham is held in front of the temple on the last Thursday of the month of Dhanu. People come several parts in Kerala come at Palluruthy to do business and buy products from the fair.
