= Basilica of Our Lady of Snows, Pallippuram =

Manjumatha Basilica (Basilica of Our Lady of Snows)
- പരിശുദ്ധ മഞ്ഞുമാതാവിന്റെ ദേവാലയം
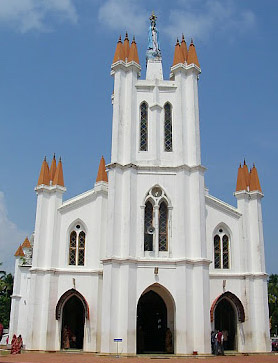
- Our Lady of Snow (Manjumatha)
- Manjumatha Basilica (Basilica of Our Lady of Snows)
- 10.167483°N 76.182809°E
- Location: Ernakulam, Kerala
- Country: India
- Denomination: Latin Church
- Website: https://www.manjumathabasilica.org

History
- Status: Basilica
- Founded: 1507
- Dedication: Holy Mary

Architecture
- Functional status: Active
- Designated: 25 August 2012
- Style: Portuguese

Administration
- District: Ernakulam
- Archdiocese: Verapoly (Varappuzha)
- Diocese: Kottapuram
- Parish: Pallipuram

Clergy
- Archbishop: His Grace Dr. Joseph Kalathiparambil
- Bishop: His Excellency Dr. Ambrose Puthenveetil
- Rector: Rev.Fr. Antony Kurisingal

The Basilica of Our Lady of Snows, Pallippuram, Ernakulam, Kerala, is a minor basilica. The basilica decree was issued on 27 August 2012. The raising of the Pallippuram church was officially announced at the conclusion of the silver jubilee celebrations of the diocese on 7 October.

== History ==
Campus of Basilica of Our Lady of Snows church

In 52 AD, St. Thomas, the apostle landed in India at Maliankara near the port of Muziris. This Port was also called Muchiri because the River Periyar's branches out into three (In [Malayalam] these three branches were called Muchiri or three broken lips) before it joins the Arabian Sea. This was one of the oldest and busiest port on the West Coast of India known to the world by more than twenty different names. In the biggest ever flood known in the history of Kerala, this Port was washed off in 1341 AD and a new Island known as Vypin was formed near Kochi or Cochin in the Vembanad Lake. People from various places migrated to the new island.

The Portuguese built a fort at Pallipuram as a watchtower in 1503. It is the oldest existing European fort in India. At the same time, the Portuguese built a church for the believers of the surrounding area and dedicated it to Our Lady. It was the church at that time where Christians in that area gathered together for worship.

During the Mysorean invasion of Kerala in the 18th century, Tipu Sultan was camped near the River Chalakkudy in order to attack parts of Travancore. He destroyed most of the Christian and Hindu places of worship. The local people gathered together in the church and prayed to Our Lady for her help. At that time, there was a mist (snow) spread around the church and Tipu and his military could not see the church or the surrounding areas. They thought it was part of the Arabian Sea. There was also a high flood in the River Periyar and Tipu lost a huge part of his military and returned to Mysore. It was the miracle that changed the name of Our Lady to Manjumatha (Our Lady of Snow).

The church was renovated in 1931 and rebuilt in 2006. It came under the diocese of Kochi in 1557 and became a parish in 1577. The Kottapuram diocese was formed by dividing the Varappuzha diocese.

== Basilica ==
On 27 August 2012, Pope Benedict XVI issued a decree and raised its status to that of minor basilica. It is the 20th Basilica in India and the eighth in Kerala (as of August 2012). At the time of the jubilee of the Kottapuram Diocese, the papal nuncio to India, His Excellency Archbishop Salvatore Pennacchio officially declared the decree.

== Annual Feast ==
The annual feast of Our Lady of Snow is celebrated on 5 August every year. The feast starts on the evening of 30 July. The eight-day feast is celebrated on 15 August, the Assumption of Our Lady and the independence day of India.

== Gallery ==
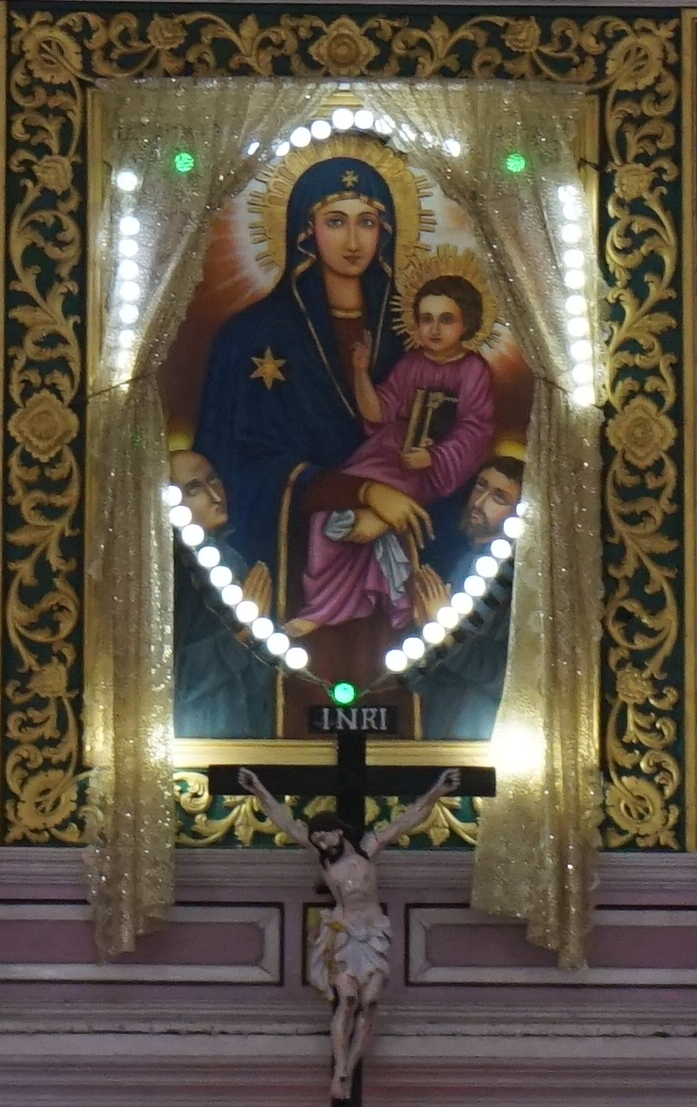
500-year-old Portuguese painting in Basilica of Our Lady of Snows

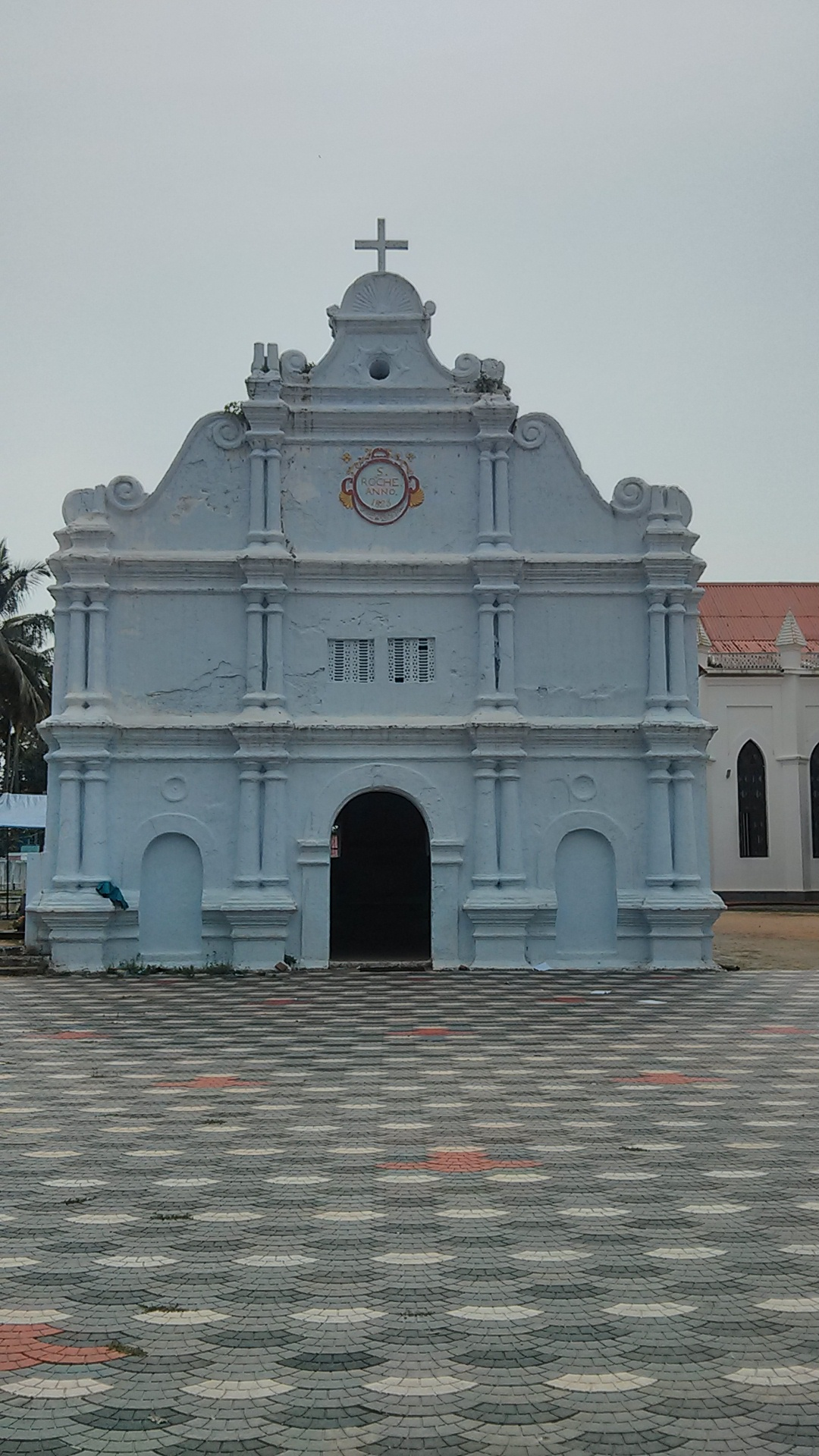
Main building of the Church

Timeline history of Basilica of Our Lady of Snows church

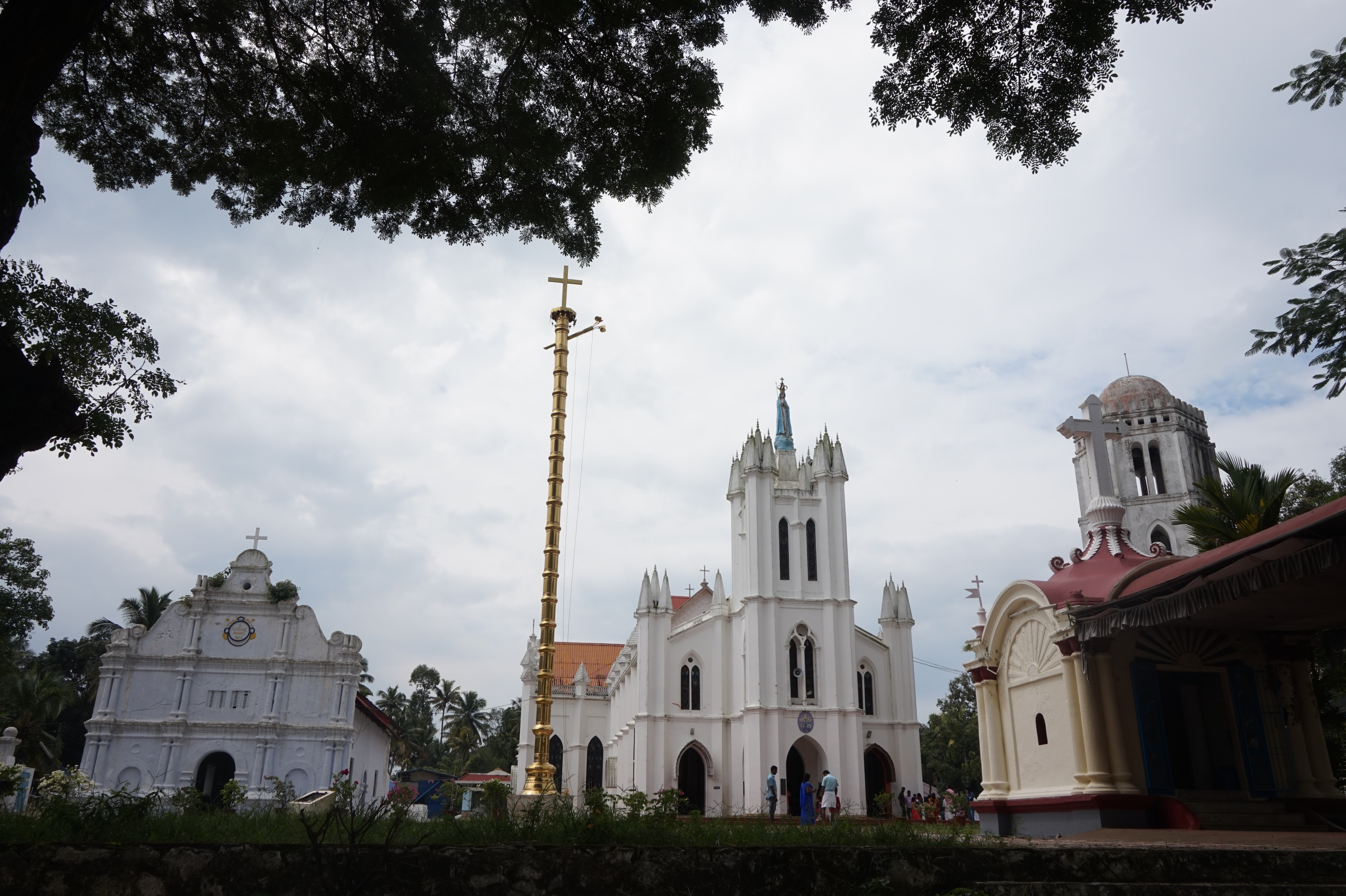
An Overall View of the Basilica Complex

Graveyard of Basilica of Our Lady of Snows church

== See also ==
- National Shrine & Basilica of Our Lady of Ransom, Ernakulam.
- Basilica of Our Lady of Good Health, Velankanni, Tamil Nadu, India.
- Poondi Matha Basilica (Our Lady of Lourdes Basilica, Poondi), Tamil Nadu, India.
