= Edavanakad =

- Village
- Location in Kerala, India Edavanakad (India)
- Coordinates: 10.015°N 76.22°E
- Country: India
- State: Kerala
- District: Ernakulam

Population (September 2011)
  - Total: 24,856

Languages
  - Official: Malayalam, English
- Time zone: UTC+5:30 (IST)
- PIN: 682 502
- Telephone code: 0484
- Vehicle registration: KL-42
- Nearest city: Kochi (Cochin)
- Lok Sabha constituency: Ernakulam

Edavanakad is a part of the Vypin islands, which comes under the Ernakulam district of Kerala, India. It is a suburb of Kochi city. The Vypin–Munambam state highway passes through the village. It is bordered by the Arabian Sea on the west, Vembanadu Lake on the east, Kuzhupilly village on the north and Nayarambalam village on the south.

== General information ==
Edavanakkad is known as the "Heart of Vypin". It is the smallest village in the Vypin islands and contains 15 wards.

Educational institutions

Edavanakad is also home to the HIHSS (Hidayahtul Islam Higher Secondary School), KPMHS (Kumarapanikkar Memorial High School) and the Agasthya Siddha Vaidhya Ashram.

Notable People

• Vincent

• Siddique

• Dileep
