= Leaders For Democracy Fellows Program =

The Leaders for Democracy Fellowship (LDF) Program is a three-month program that provides emerging leaders from across the Middle East and North Africa with the opportunity to complete training in leadership, civic engagement, participatory governance, conflict resolution, and communication. Emerging civic leaders with strong Arabic skills will spend three months in Lebanon, while those with university-level English proficiency will go to the United States, gaining academic and practical experience, as well as networking with like-minded peers and professionals. The program is sponsored by United States Department of State's U.S.-Middle East Partnership Initiative and implemented by World Learning.
