= Palluruthy =

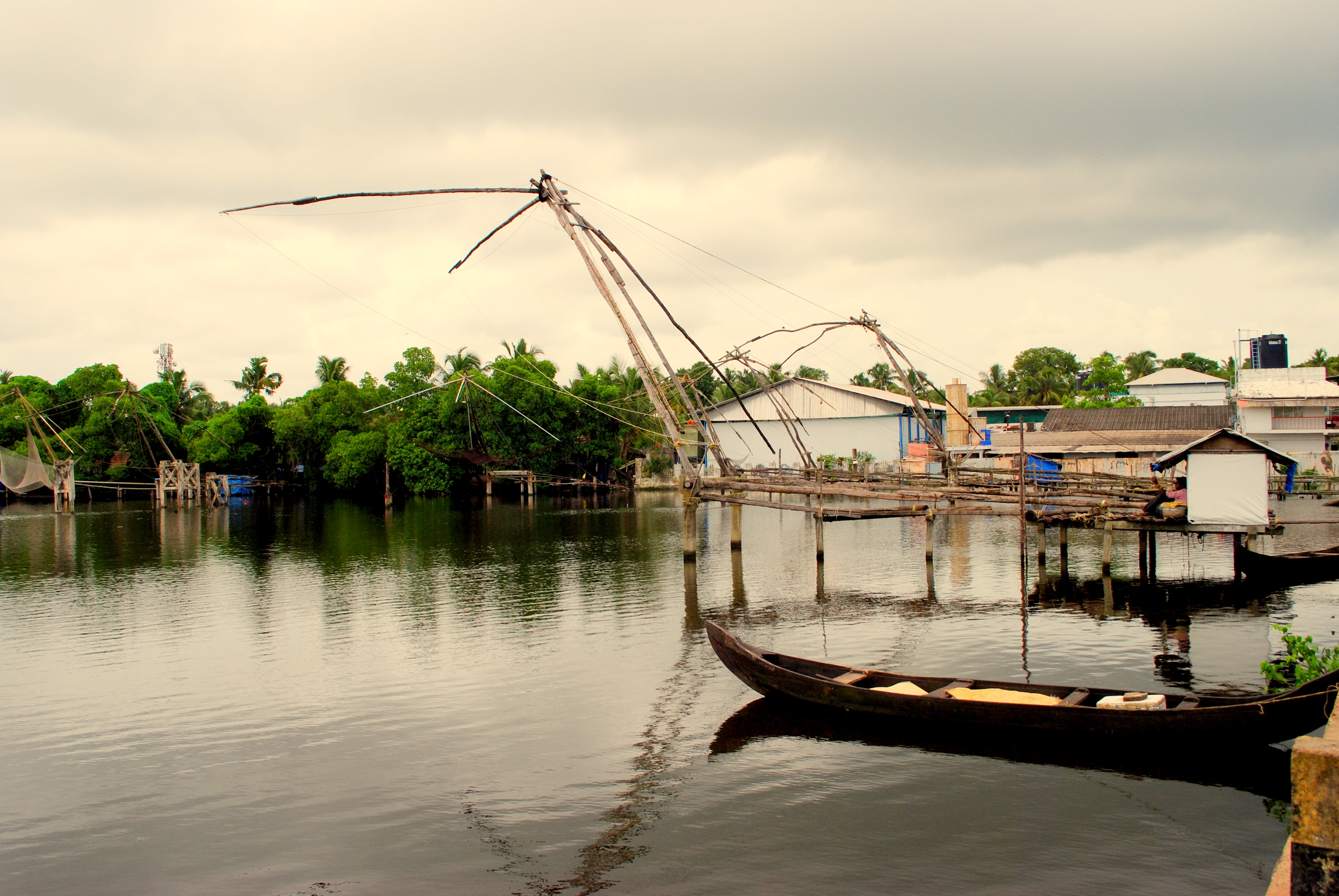
- Palluruthy

- Location in Kerala, India
- Coordinates: 9°55′17″N 76°16′26″E
- Country: India
- State: Kerala
- District: Ernakulam

Languages
  - Official: Malayalam, English
- Time zone: UTC+5:30 (IST)
- Postal code: 682006
- Telephone code: 0484
- Vehicle registration: KL-07, KL-43

Palluruthy is a region in the city of Kochi, in the state of Kerala, India. Palluruthy is part of the water bound West Kochi, lying westward to the Kochi mainland. Palluruthy comprises the regions Thoppumpady, Perumpadappu, Edakochi, Mundamveli and Kumbalanghi. The place is famous for its temples, landscapes, backwaters and lotus pond. A historical trade fair called Pulavanibham is held every year at Palluruthy during the Malayalam month Dhanu.

== See also ==
- Pulavanibham
