= Veeranpuzha =

Lake in Kochi, India

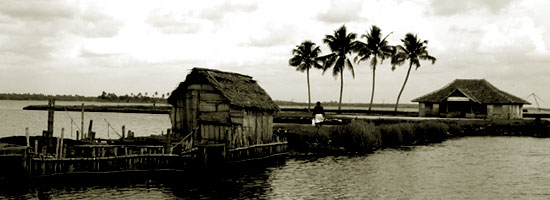

- Location within Kerala
- Location: Kochi, Kerala
- Coordinates: 10.07°N 76.24°E
- Basin countries: India

Veeranpuzha is a lake in Kochi, Kerala, India. It is the northern extension of Vembanad Lake. From Kochi Azhi to Munambam Azhi, the Vembanad lake is popularly known as "Veeranpuzha". In the early 1980s, there were regular ferry services from Munambam to Ernakulam. The area has large paddy fields devoid of human habitation. Non-availability of fresh water is a reason for lack of dense human settlements. Veeranpuzha was also known as Kadakkarakkayal.

== Pokkali cultivation ==
The saline tolerant Pokkali rice is cultivated in the fields gathered around the banks of Veeranpuzha. Pokkali uses a cyclic organic cultivation method. As the salinity level of the water in the fields is low, the rice cultivation starts in June and harvesting starts in November. After the harvesting ends, from November to April, the salinity level gets high in the water. At this time, prawn farming starts in the fields. There are openings in the sluice gates from the lake to the field. Through these openings, the prawn seedlings swim into the field from the sea and the lake after the rice harvest and consume the stem remains of the harvested crop. Recently, many Pokkali farmers of Veeranpuzha are leaving farming and migrating to other industries as farming has become unattractive and unprofitable.

== Local tourism ==
Many local tourists visit Veeranpuzha mainly for angling during rainy season. Some water-front tourism festivals are being organized in recent times mainly to attract foreign tourists.
