= K. N. Unnikrishnan =

Indian politician

Member of the Kerala Legislative Assembly for Vypen
- In office 2 May 2021 – 23 May 2026
- Preceded by: S. Sharma (LDF)-CPI (M)
- Succeeded by: Tony Chammany
- Majority: 8,201(2021)

Personal details
- Born: K. N. Unnikrishnan; 19 January 1961 (age 65)
- Party: Communist Party of India (Marxist) (CPI (M))
- Spouse: Ambika Unnikrishnan
- Children: Remya Unnikrishnan, Reshma Unnikrishnan
- Occupation: Politician

K. N. Unnikrishnan is an Indian politician who served as the Member of the Legislative Assembly (MLA) for the seat of Vypen at the Kerala Legislative Assembly from 2021 to 2026.

== Election results ==
Kerala Legislative Assembly
Year	Constituency	Candidate		Votes	Pct	Opponent(s)		Votes	Pct	Ballots cast	Majority	Turnout
2021	No.79 Vypen	K. N. Unnikrishnan (CPI (M))	53,858	41.24%		Deepak Joy (INC)	45,657	34.96%	100%	130,596	8,201	78.9%
2021	No.79 Vypen	K. N. Unnikrishnan (CPI (M))	53,858	41.24%		Job Chakkalackal (Twenty 20 Party)	16,707	12.79%	100%	130,596	8,201	78.9%
2021	No.79 Vypen	K. N. Unnikrishnan (CPI (M))	53,858	41.24%		K. S. Shaiju (BJP)	13,540	10.37%	100%	130,596	8,201	78.9%
2021	No.79 Vypen	K. N. Unnikrishnan (CPI (M))	53,858	41.24%		None of the above	525	0.40%	100%	130,596	8,201	78.9%
2021	No.79 Vypen	K. N. Unnikrishnan (CPI (M))	53,858	41.24%		M. K. Mukundan (IND)	309	0.24%	100%	130,596	8,201	78.9%
