= Perumpadappu, Ernakulam =

Perumpadappu
- Neighborhood
- Location in Kerala, India
- Coordinates: 9°54′20″N 76°16′50″E
- Country: India
- State: Kerala
- District: Ernakulam

Government
  - Body: Cochin corporation

Languages
  - Official: Malayalam, English
- Time zone: UTC+5:30 (IST)
- PIN: 682006
- Telephone code: 223,232
- Vehicle registration: KL-43
- Literacy: 95%

Perumpadappu is a small area of Palluruthy region of Cochin city of Ernakulam district, Kerala. It is about 4 km^{2} in area and has three Hindu temples, two churches and a mosque.

== Etymology ==
Perumpaṭappu is a compound of perum "big" + paṭappu "garden".
