= Pallippuram, Ernakulam =

Pallippuram Palliport (Paliporte)
- Village
- Location in Kerala, India
- Coordinates: 10.161°N 76.187°E
- Country: India
- State: Kerala
- District: Ernakulam

Government
  - Body: Pallipuram

Languages
  - Official: Malayalam, English
- Time zone: UTC+5:30 (IST)
- Postal code: 683515
- Telephone code: 0484
- Vehicle registration: KL-42
- Nearest city: Kochi
- constituency: Vypin
- Civic agency: Pallipuram

Pallippuram (also known in English as Palliport or in Portuguese as Paliporte) is a village on Vypeen island, in Kochi, Kerala, south India. The village is located approximately 25 km from Ernakulam and 20 km from Cochin International Airport. The east border is Periyar River, and the Arabian Sea in the west.

Nearby attractions include the famous Cherai Beach, Pallipuram Fort, Munambam Fishing Harbour and Muziris beach( Golden Beach ). Pallippuram Fort was built by the Portuguese in 1503. It is one of the oldest existing European monuments in India. The Catholic Basilica at Pallippuram known as Church of "Our Lady of Snow" or "Manjumatha" is an important pilgrim centre for Christians.

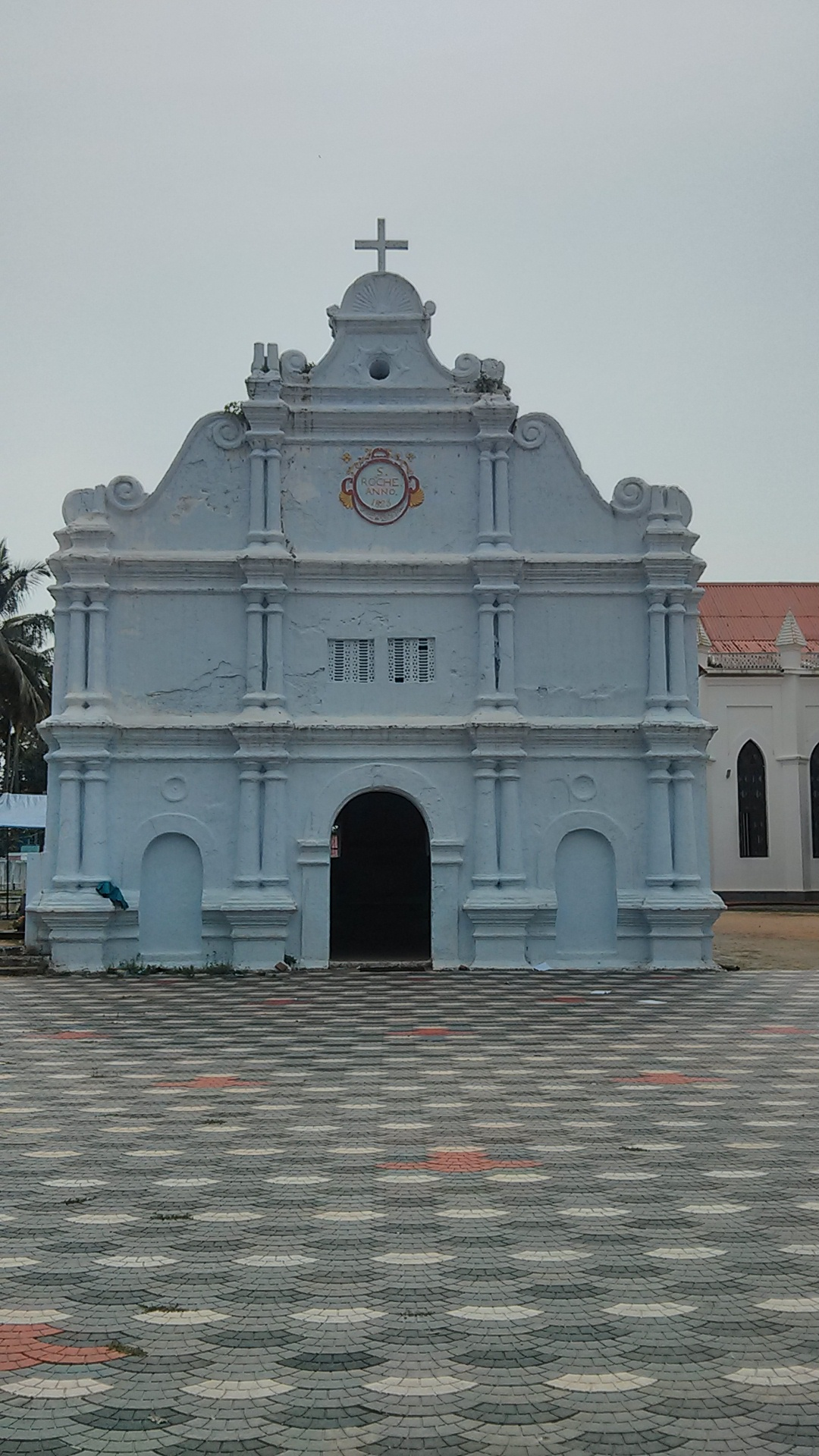
Manjumatha Our Lady of Snow Basilica (old Church)

== See also ==
- Ernakulam District
- Vypin
- North Paravur
- Cherai

Pallippuram church is raised to the status of a basilica in the month of October 2012
