= Transport in Ernakulam district =

Transport in Ernakulam district consists of various modes.

== Transport Sections ==
There are 9 Regional Transport Offices.

- Ernakulam – KL 07
- Muvattupuzha – KL 17
- Thripunithura – KL 39
- Perumbavoor – KL 40
- Aluva – KL 41
- North Paravur – KL 42
- Mattancherry – KL 43
- Kothamangalam – KL 44
- Angamaly – KL 63

The district has got the maximum number of vehicles in the state.

== Road connectivity ==
Ernakulam district has excellent road connectivity. The three major national highways passing through Ernakulam District are the Cochin-Mumbai Highway (NH 66), Salem-Kanyakumari (NH 47 part of NSEW corridor) and Cochin-Dhanushkodi highway (NH 49).

== North South Corridor ==
The North South Corridor highway system starting from Edapally in Cochin on NH47 and connects the cities Thrissur, Palakkad, Coimbatore, Salem and finally to Chennai . The National Highway 66 starting from Kanyakumari and rest of the country towards north Nagercoil, Trivandrum, Kollam, Alapuzha and towards Edapally and connects the cities Guruvayur, Calicut, Kannur, Kasaragod, Mangalore, Goa and Mumbai. The National Highway 49, also known as Madurai Highway starts from Kundannur near Cochin and passes through Muvattupuzha, Kothamangalam, Munnar, Theni, Madurai and finally terminates at Dhanushkodi. The district also has the two small national highways namely NH 47A for Cochin Port connectivity (Smallest Indian National Highway) starting from Kundannur and NH 47C as part of the International Container Transshipment Terminal connectivity starting from Kalamassery.

== Major highways ==
The district is also well connected by state highways and other roads. Important state highway SH 1 also known as Main Central Road starts from Angamaly, a suburb of Kochi city which connects to the state capital Trivandrum via Perumbavoor, Muvattupuzha, Koothattukulam.

- Seaport – Airport road via Kakkanad
- Palarivattom – Moovattupuzha – Punalur SH:- Connects Kakkanad, Pallikkara, Kizhakkambalam, Pattimattom, Moovattupuzha, Vazhakulam, Thodupuzha, Pathanamthitta
- North Paravur – Aluva – Munnar SH:- Connects Alengad, Perumbavoor, Kothamangalam
- Vypin- Munambam SH:- Connects Vypin, Njarackal, Cherai, Munambam
- Thrippunithura – Sabarimalai:-Connects Mulamthuruthy, Piravom, Pala, Erumely
- Vytilla- Kottayam road:- Connects via Thripoonithura, Nadakkavu, Poothotta, Vaikkom, Kumarakom
- Fort Kochi – Alappuzha road
- Angamaly – Athirappilly road via Mookkanur
- Perumbavoor – Puthencruz road

== Railway system ==
Ernakulam district has 17 railway stations. The Ernakulam Junction and Ernakulam Town and Aluva are the major ones. The other stations are Angamaly, Thripunithura, Edapally, Mulamthuruthy, Cochin Harbour Terminus, Karakutty, Chowara, Kalamassery, Nettoor, Kumbalam, Mattancherry H., Chottanikkara road and Piravom road. The railroutes are via Thrissur, Kottayam, Cochin Harbour Terminus, Alappuzha and Vallarpadam. The proposed Angamaly-Erumely Sabarimala route passes through the district. Kochi Metro was opened in 2017.

== Air transport ==
Ernakulam district has two airports, Naval airport in W. island (Old Cochin airport) and Cochin International Airport (CIAL). CIAL is the fifth busiest airport in the country after Mumbai, Delhi, Bengaluru and Chennai by International traffic. As of March 2025, flights operate from Cochin to the Persian Gulf region, Malaysia, Singapore, Sri Lanka and to major cities in India.

== Waterways ==
Ernakulam district lies in the flat delta region of the Periyar and Moovattupuzha rivers. Water transport is prominent in the district through rivers and lagoons. The major boat services are in Ernakulam area and other areas having small ferry services. The district boasts of having the largest port in the west coast of the country: the Cochin port, which is also the reason for large scale developments in the district. The International Container Transshipment Terminal at Vallarpadom boosts the developments in the district further. The Kochi Water Metro was opened in 2023, which is the first integrated water transport system in India.
