= Pachalam =

- Neighbourhood
- Location in Kerala, India
- Coordinates: 10.00°N 76.28°E
- Country: India
- State: Kerala
- District: Ernakulam

Languages
  - Official: Malayalam, English
- Time zone: UTC+5:30 (IST)
- Vehicle registration: KL-
- Nearest city: Kochi

Pachalam is a region in the city of Kochi in Kerala, India.

One of the main attractions near Pachalam is the Queen's Walkway, which connects Pachalam to Goshree Bridge Road and Marine Drive. Although the roads are generally narrow (except for the wider Pottakuzhy Road, which is poorly maintained), traffic has increased as roads inside Pachalam provide an alternative route for motorists seeking to bypass Banerjee Road, especially during the Kochi Metro construction phase.

A Kerala Institute of Tourism and Travel Studies (KITTS) study centre is located in Pachalam.

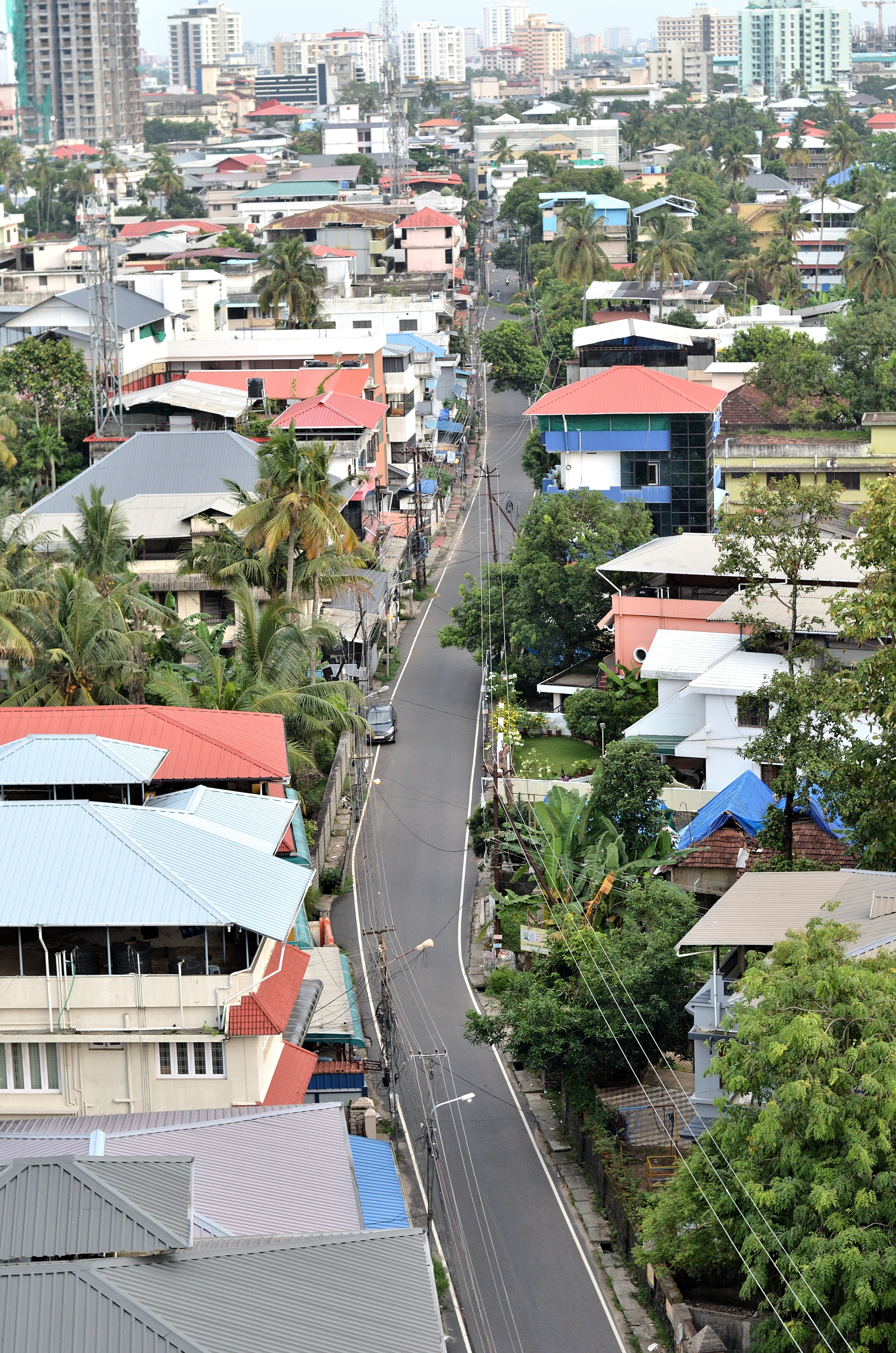
Siva Rama Menon Road, Pachalam – Kaloor

== Location ==
Goshree Bridge Road at Marine Drive ends at Pachalam. Pachalam can also be reached via Chittoor Road. Mulavukad island lies to its west, Vaduthala and Chittoor island to its north, Elamakkara to the northeast, and Mamagalam and Palarivattom to its east, with Kaloor to the southeast. It is situated between Marine Drive, Kaloor, and Edapally, acting as a connecting link between several important locations in Kochi.

== Landmarks ==
- Pottakuzhy Gas Crematorium (Shmashanam)
- Pottakuzhy Road
- Kattungal Temple
- Pachalam Market
- P.J Antony Ground
- The Virus House
- Little Flower Church
- Capernum Charitable Society
- Thachapuzha Sree Balabhadra Devi Kshetram
- Mount Carmel Church, Chathiath
- Link Park Housing Colony
- Lourdes Hospital
- Goodness Institute of Film and Television
- Siva Rama Menon Road (SRM Road)
- LMCC Girls High School

== Governance ==
Pachalam falls under ward 73 of the Corporation of Cochin. The councillor is Albert Ambalathingal of the UDF Party. The local MLA is Shri Hibi Eden, also from UDF, who resides nearby.

== Infrastructure ==
The Pachalam over-bridge was added in 2015, after a wait of more than 35 years. The bridge is considered poorly designed. Many new bridges in Cochin are constructed without long-term city planning in mind and often start and end at junctions (e.g., Aluva Bridge, Pachalam Bridge, Kathrikadavu Bridge).
