= Pachalam ROB =

Pachalam ROB പച്ചാളം ROB
- Carries: Pachalam - Vaduthala
- Locale: Pachalam, Kerala, India

Characteristics
- Width: 10 m (33 ft)

History
- Opened: March 2015

Pachalam Railway Over Bridge is bridge connecting Pachalam to Sree Kattungal Bhagavathy Temple in Vaduthala. The bridge starts at about 3 km north of Pachalam junction, crosses the railway track, turns South and will land 3 metre ahead of the main entrance of Kattungal Bhagavathy Temple. It eases the congestion in the Kochi City especially in the Vaduthala- Pachalam route along the Chittoor Road. It is constructed by Delhi Metro Rail Corporation (DMRC) and construction started in March 2014. The bridge was inaugurated by Chief Minister of Kerala Oommen Chandy.
