= Ochanthuruth =

- Village
- Location in Kerala, India Ochanthuruth (India)
- Coordinates: 10°0′0″N 76°14′0″E
- Country: India
- State: Kerala
- District: Ernakulam

Government
  - Body: Panchayath

Area
  - Total: 4.83 km^{2} (1.86 sq mi)

Population (2020)
  - Total: 15,039
  - Density: 3,110/km^{2} (8,100/sq mi)

Languages
  - Official: Malayalam, English
- Time zone: UTC+5:30 (IST)
- PIN: 682508
- Telephone code: 0484
- Vehicle registration: KL 42
- Nearest city: Kochi
- Lok Sabha constituency: Ernakulam
- Civic agency: Panchayath
- Climate: Tropical monsoon (Köppen)
- Avg. summer temperature: 32 °C (90 °F)
- Avg. winter temperature: 24 °C (75 °F)

Ochanthuruth is one of the villages in Vypin, an island in Ernakulam district, Kerala, India. It is on the southern part of Vypin.

== Geography ==
It is located at Vypin Island of Ernakulam District.

== Location ==
Ochanthuruth is 3 miles (5 km) north of Kochi.

== Getting there ==
The commissioning of the Goshree bridges in 2004 has greatly improved the connectivity to Vypin island from the mainland. Regular ferry and boat services are also available between Vypin and Fort Kochi.

== Tourism ==
The lighthouse at Puthuvype attracts a number of tourists. The lighthouse is open to tourists on all days from 3 pm to 5 pm. The famous Cherai Beach and Pallipuram Fort are near Ochanthuruth.

== Churches ==
- Cruz Milagres Church (Kurisingal Church)
- Church of Our Lady of Perpetual Help (Vadakke Palli)

== Notable people ==
- Joseph Attipetty, Archbishop of Verapoly
- Eliswa Vakayil, first religious sister from Kerala and the foundress of Third Order of the Discalced Carmelite Congregation, the first indigenous Carmelite Congregation in India.

== Bus stops ==
Significance	Landmarks
Company Peedika	Sree S.S Sabha School (UP), Cruz Milagres Church (Kurisingal Palli), Vypeen Hospital
Puthuvype	Major Jn. and Shopping area, Beach & Light House, Temples, St. Antony's Shrine, Federal Bank, Post office, Village Office, Auditorium, Santa Cruz H.S.S., C.M.E.P.S.
Schoolmuttom	Our Family Clinic, State Bank of India, Temple, St. Marys L.P. School
Valappu	Fish Market, Our Lady of Perpetual Help Church (Vadakke Palli).
