= Perumpilly, Narakkal =

Perumpilly
- Sub-village
- Location within Kerala Location within India
- Coordinates: 10.034°N 76.221°E
- Country: India
- State: Kerala
- District: Ernakulam
- Village: Narakkal

Perumpilly is a prominent suburb of Njarakkal, on the southern edge of Narakkal Village, bordering Elankunnapuzha Village. The people of the sub-village are mostly Hindu or Christian by belief. People of the Hindu community here belong to many castes, such as Pulaya, Ezhava, Araya, Kudumbi and Nair. But Christians here in this community belong to different denominations practising different rites like Catholics, prominently represented by Latin Catholics and Syrian Catholics. A few Protestant believers also live here.

== Facilities ==
Holy Family Church, Perumpilly, belongs to the Latin Catholic Christian community. It is situated approximately 500 meters at the eastern end of Perumpilly Church Road, which goes east off the Vypeen–Munambam Road from the Perumpilly Church Road Bus stop, Narakkal.
