= Vembanad Rail Bridge =

Bridge in India

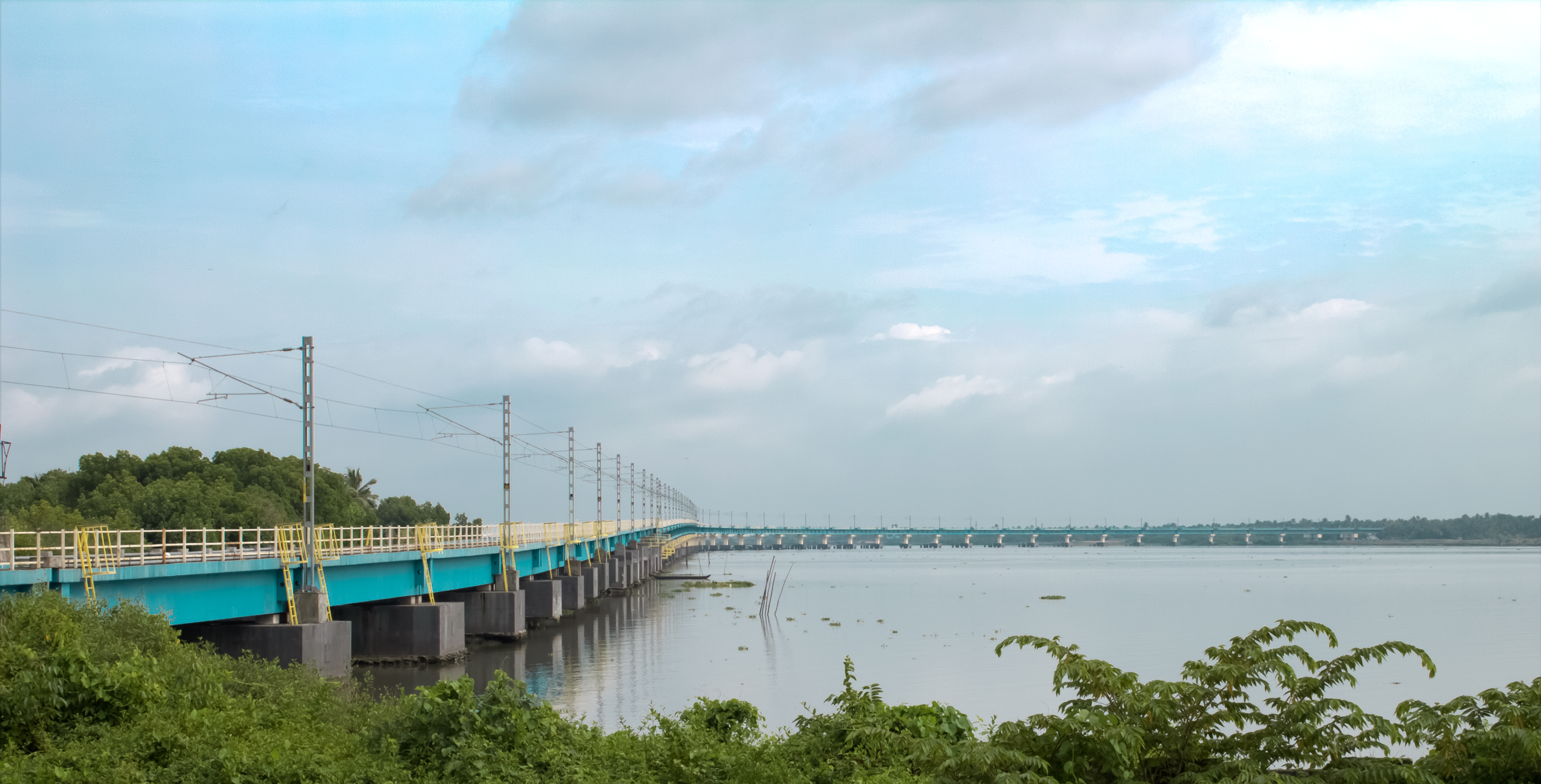
- Coordinates: 10.006°N 76.258°E
- Carries: Rail
- Crosses: Vembanad Lake
- Locale: Kochi, Kerala, India
- Other name: Edappally - Vallarpadam Bridge
- Maintained by: Rail Vikas Nigam Limited

Characteristics
- Design: Beam bridge
- Material: Prestressed Concrete
- Total length: 4.62 km
- Width: 5-metre
- Height: 7.5-metre
- No. of spans: 132

History
- Constructed by: Afcons Infrastructure
- Construction start: June 2007
- Construction end: 31 March 2010
- Inaugurated: 11 February 2011

Statistics
- Daily traffic: 15 trains *

Location
- Interactive map of Vembanad Rail Bridge

Vembanad Rail Bridge is a railway bridge over the Vembanad Lake in Kerala, India. With a total length of 4.62 km, it is the ninth longest railway bridge in India. It is part of the 8.86 km rail corridor between Edappally and Vallarpadam Terminal. After a period of disuse, freight service was relaunched in January 2020.

== Construction ==
The construction of the bridge started in June 2007 and was completed on 31 March 2010. The rail bridge was built by Rail Vikas Nigam Ltd., Chennai PIU, A Government of India Enterprise (RVNL). The project was contracted to Afcons Infrastructure.

== Route ==
The link from Edapally to Vallarpadam start from Edapally running 3 km parallel to an existing track until it reaches Vaduthala. The rail line then passes through the Vembanad Bridge through 3 small islands, including the Idyakkara and Mulavukad islands in Vembanad Lake to reach Vallarpadam. 80% of the bridge is constructed over water.

== Details ==
A total of 11700 tonnes of reinforced steel, 58000 tonnes of cement, 99000 cubic metre of metal aggregates, 73500 cubic metre of sand, 127000 cubic metre of concrete work and 154308 cubic metre of earth work went into this project. The bridge is constructed over pile foundations at 133 locations. The bridge comprises 231 girders, each weighing 220 tonnes. The bridge has 132 spans consisting of 33 spans of 20 m and 99 spans of 40 m which are made of PSC girders and cater to electric traction.

== See also ==
- International Container Transshipment Terminal, Kochi
- List of longest bridges in the world
- List of longest bridges above water in India
