= Joseph Attipetty =

Roman-catholic archbishop

Servant of God Archbishop Joseph Attipetty
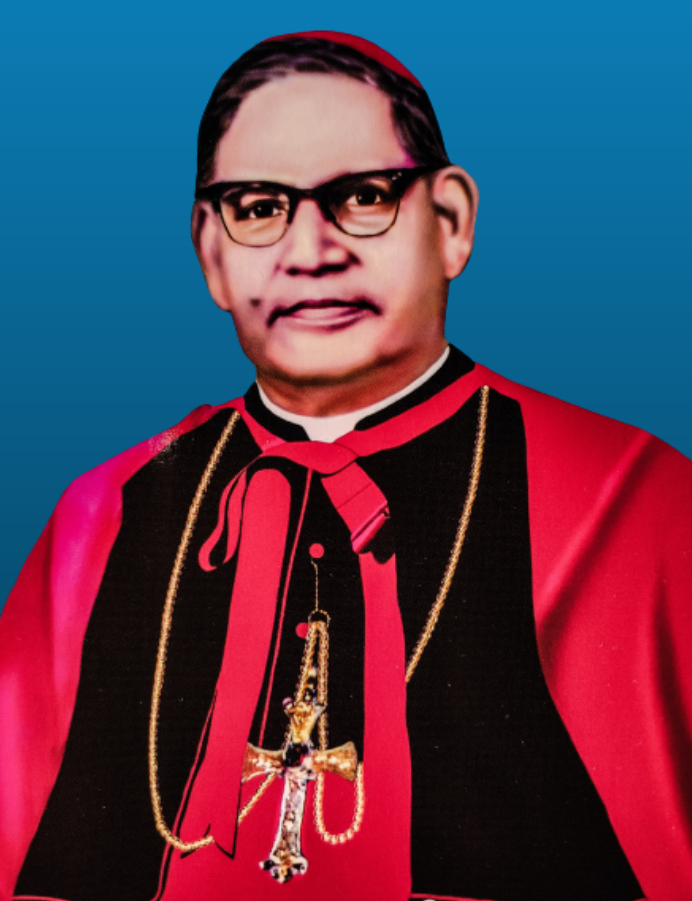
- Archbishop Joseph Attipetty
- Born: 25 June 1894; Ochanthuruth, Cochin State now in Ernakulam, Kerala, India
- Died: 21 January 1970 (aged 75); Ernakulam, Kerala, India

Joseph Attipetty (June 25, 1894 – January 21, 1970) was the first native bishop of the Roman Catholic Archdiocese of Verapoly.

== Early life and education ==
Joseph Attipetty was born on June 25, 1894, as the second of five children of Matthew and Rosa, at Ochanthuruth in the parish of Cruz Milagris, then in Cochin State, now Ernakulam, Kerala, India. His father was a seminarian, but realizing that his vocation was not priesthood, he dropped from seminary and later married Rosa. Attipetty was fondly called "Kochu Jusei" (കൊച്ചുജ്യൂസെ). He did his primary education at St. Mary's School, Ochanthuruthu and then at St. Albert's High School, Ernakulam. He was sent to St. Joseph's college in Trichy, run by the Jesuit fathers for pursuing his bachelor's degree. His association and close contact with the Jesuit clergy was instrumental in shaping his future.

== Vocation ==
After completing his B.A degree, Attipetty returned to his native region. As his desire to become a priest grew stronger, he told his family, but had to face fierce opposition. But later, on the recommendation of several clergymen, a decision was taken in his favour. Angel Mary, the then Bishop of Verapoly, sent him to Rome for his priestly studies and formation.

After seven years of study at the Propaganda Seminary in Rome, Attipetty earned a PhD in philosophy and an STD in theology. During his studies, he was director of the ‘Pia Associatio Matris Misericordiae’, a group that helps young people in their call to the priestly life, Vice President of Propaganda Theological Students and the Spiritual Head of the College's Staff. On December 18, 1926, Cardinal Basilio Pompili, Vicar General of Rome, ordained Attipetty as a priest. Attipetty said his first Holy Mass on the altar of St. Peter's tomb, in St. Peter's Basilica.

Attipetty returned to Ernakulam and offered his first Mass in his native place at the Church of Our Lady of Ransom, Vallarpadom. He was appointed as the assistant vicar of Mount Carmel Church, Chathiath and he served there for two years. Thereafter, on January 30, 1929, he was appointed as the Secretary to Angel Mary and Chancellor of the archdiocese.

Rome decided to appoint an auxiliary bishop as part of giving autonomy for Verapoly archdiocese and Attippetty's name was suggested. In 1933, the Holy Father scheduled to officiate at the anointing of the ordained Bishop in Rome. After the resignation of Angel Mary, Attipetty assumed the reigns of administration on December 21, 1934 as the first indigenous Archbishop of Verapoly archdiocese. His Pallium Investiture took place on July 25, 1935.

== Death and recognition of holiness ==
Attipetty served the diocese and its people for 37 years. He died on January 21, 1970. Many faithful visit his tomb at the "Smrithimandhiram" at St. Francis Assisi Cathedral, Ernakulam. The process of beatification and canonization was officially inaugurated in the diocese by declaring him a Servant of God on 21 January 2020, the 50th anniversary of his death at St. Francis Assisi Cathedral, Ernakulam by Archbishop Joseph Kalathiparambil.

== Legacy ==
During Attipetty’s tenure of office, St. Albert's College, Ernakulam, House of Providence for the aged, St. Paul's College, Kalamassey, Lourde's hospital, Pachalam and Little Flower Institute, Kalamassery came into being.

Attipetty was firmly with the conservative side at the Second Vatican Council and argued for equal validity of scripture and tradition.
