= Mulavukad Gram Panchayat =

Gram Panchayat in Ernakulam district of Kerala, India

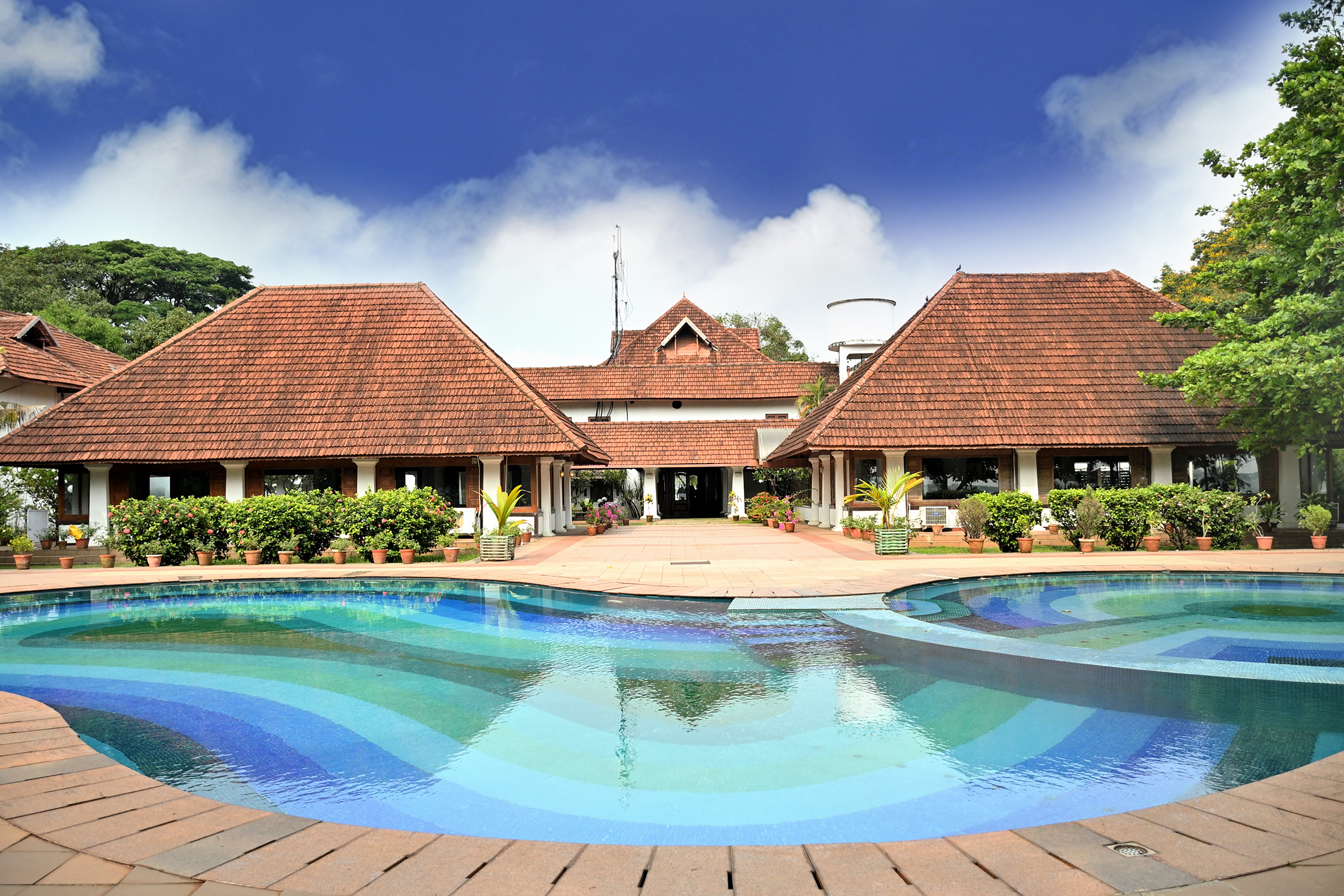
A wonderful view of Bolgatty Palace Hotel

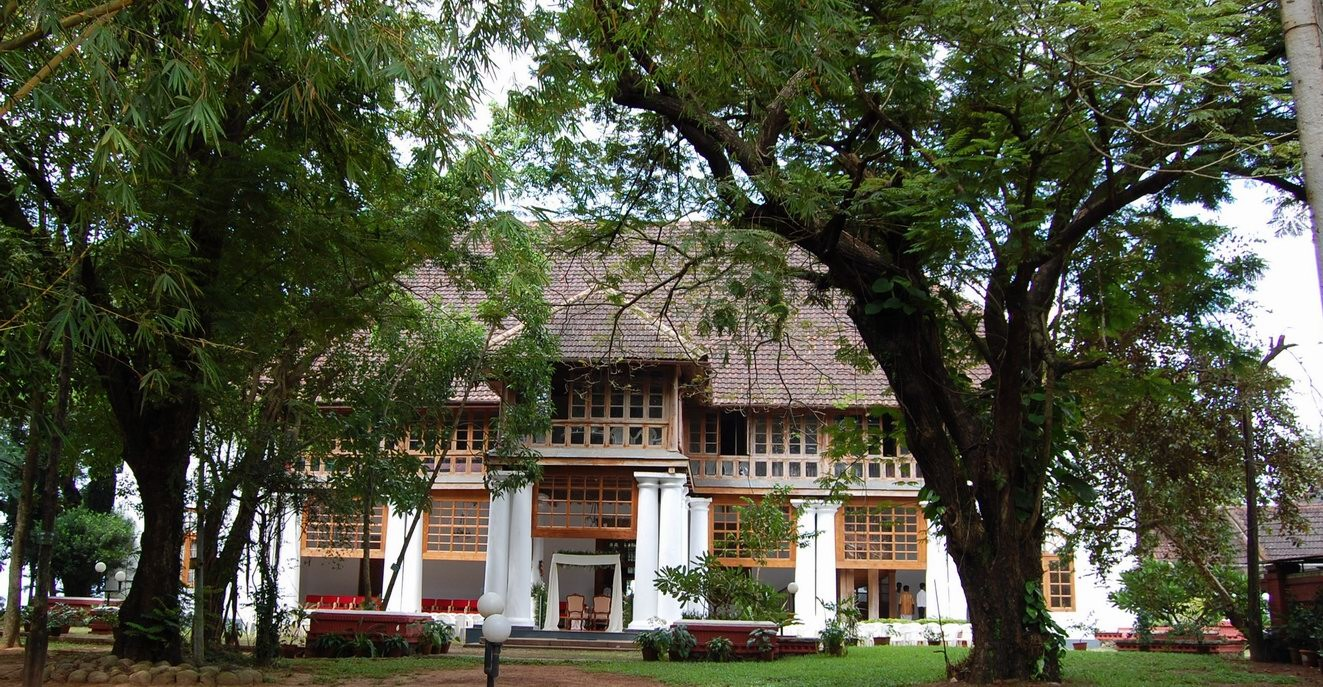
Bolgatty Palace

Mulavukad Grama Panchayat is grama panchayat in Ernakulam district, Kerala, India. It is situated in Vypin block panchayat. The major portion of this panchayat is an island with same name. It is situated some kilometres from Vypin island. The boundaries of the Mulvukad Panchayath are Kadamakkudy, Njarakkal Panchayaths in the North, Kochi Corporation in the East and South and Elangunnappuzha Panchayath in the West. This island is situated very near to Kochi city. Bolgatty Palace is a popular tourist attraction in the southern part of the island. This palace was built by Dutch in 1774. Now it is under the control of Department of Tourism, Government of Kerala.

== History ==
In the past, the people in this area were mainly engaged in the works in ships arriving at Kochi. Water was the only means of transport. But with the creation of the Gosree Bridge, the island's popularity has increased.

== Economy ==
In earlier time, people were employed on meager wages here. The main means of livelihood was to work in coir industry and work in ships. But after the arrival of Cochin Port 80% of people got permanent jobs there. The companies like Tata Group centred there work at Kochi also created job opportunities in 19th and 20th centuries. Though this island was backward in industrial progression they worked for the industries in the mainland regions like Ernakulam. The arrival of Vallarpadam Container Terminal progressed the region industrially and economically. People also engaged in the cultivation of crops like paddy, vegetables, etc.

== Culture ==
There are different cultural institutions working in this panchayat. Some of them are..

- Samskarika Nilayam
- Gramina Vayanasala
- Abraham Madamakkal Memorial Library
- Ponjikkara Library
- Rachana cultural centre
- AKG Library

== Notable personalities ==
There were different notable persons lived here like Ponjikkara Rafi, a Malayali writer and winner of Sahitya Akademi Award for his novel named Kaliyugam, Gasper De Silva who was an Anglo-Indian nominee in the legislative assembly of Kochi. He was also a member of Constitution Assembly of India in 1946. Abraham Madamakkal, an Indian freedom fighter and activist was also a notable person here.Dakshayani Velayudhan (4 July 1912 - 20 July 1978) she was also a resident of mulavukad .Belong to an Indian politician and leader of the oppressed classes.

== Wards ==
There are several wards in this panchayat including

1. Panambukad North
2. Mulavukad North
3. Tower line
4. Keralapuram
5. Vattekkadu
6. St. Mary's ward
7. Hospital ward
8. Thandassery Ward
9. Water tank ward
10. Ponnarimangalam
11. Ponjikkara
12. Bolgatty
13. Vallarpadam
14. T V Centre ward
15. Adikandam
16. Ambedkar village

== Statistics ==
Statistics
District	Ernakulam
Block Panchayt	Vypin
Area	19.27
Wards	16
Population	22322
Male	11017
Female	11305
Population density	1158
Sex ratio	1026
Literacy rate	95.19
Literacy (male)	97.9
Literacy (Female)	92.49
