= St. Mary's Church, Njarackal =

Church in Njarackal, India

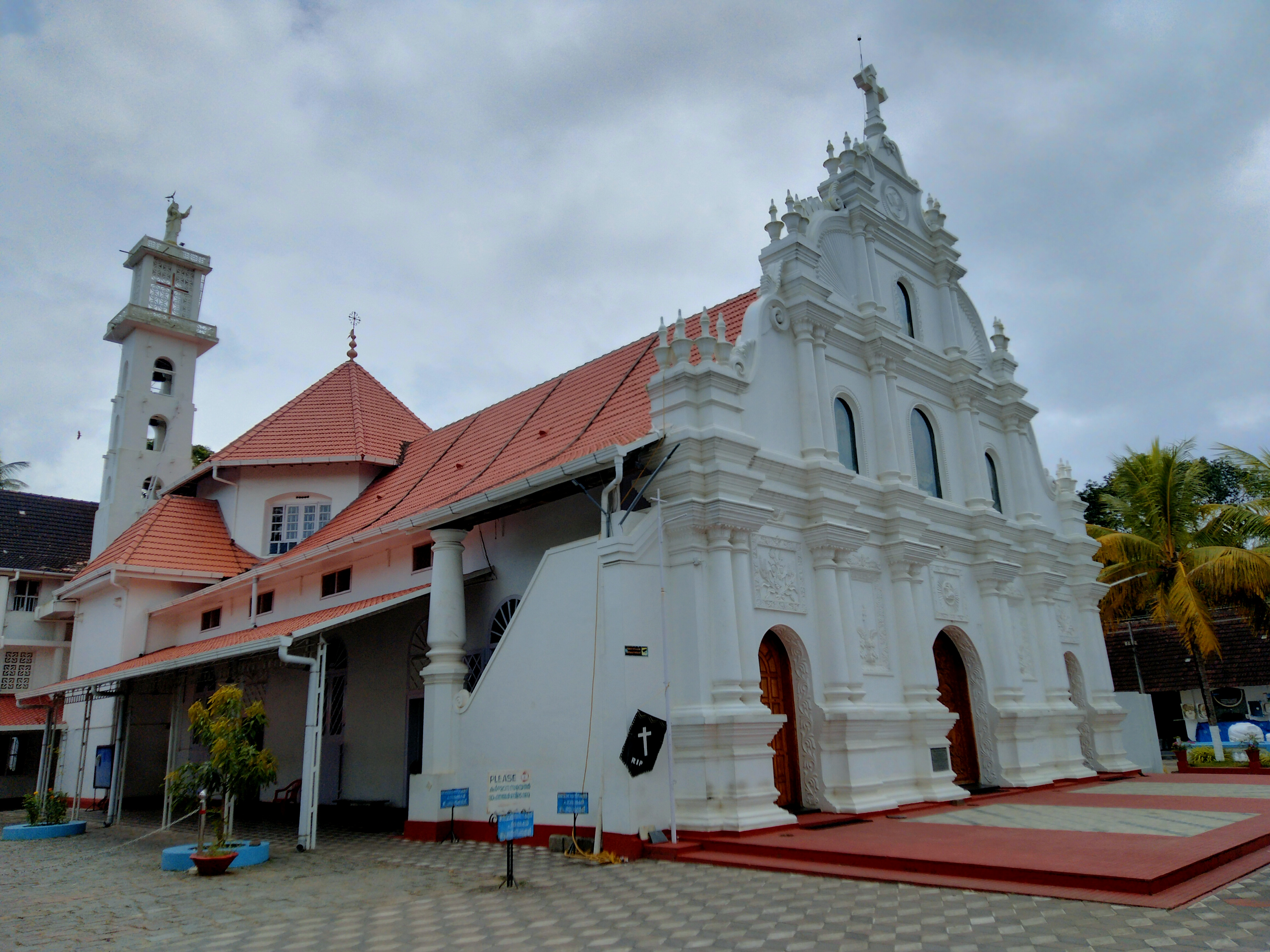
St. Mary's Church, Njarakkal

St. Mary's Church is a parish of the Syro-Malabar Catholic Church located in Njarackal (Narakkal), on the island of Vypin, part of the city of Kochi, Kerala, India. Established in 1451, it remains an active congregation of the Archeparchy of Ernakulam-Angamaly.

The current church was renovated in 2001. It features a nave of 8 arches, with 1 main altar and 4 sub altars.
