= National Highway 966A (India) =

National highway in India

National Highway 966A
- Map of National Highway 966A in red

Route information
- Length: 17 km (11 mi)

Major junctions
- From: Kalamassery, Kochi, Kerala
- To: Vallarpadam, Kochi, Kerala

Location
- Country: India
- States: Kerala

Highway system
- Roads in India; Expressways; National; State; Asian
← NH 544	→ NH 66

National Highway 966A or NH 966A starts at Kalamassery (junction with NH 544) and ends at Vallarpadam International Container Transhipment Terminal in Kochi, Kerala, India. The total length of the highway is 17 km (11 mi) and runs only inside Kochi.

The four-lane NH connectivity is one of the pre-requisite for the setting up of the Rs 2,118-crore International Container Transhipment Terminal project of the Kochi Port at Vallarpadam. The road start from the second bridge of the Goshree Islands Development Authority (GIDA) and stretch across the Kochi suburbs of Bolghatty Island, Moolampilly, Kothad, Cheranelloor, Manjummel and FACT Gypsum Ground to reach Kalamassery. The National Highway 966A is crossing the NH 66 at Cheranalloor making it the only major junction and it is one of the biggest junction in the city and state.

The road link required building 24 bridges of varying sizes, the longest of them being nearly 1 km and has been described by the National Highways Authority of India (NHAI) sources as one of the most important infrastructure projects now on in Kerala. The road and rail links to Vallarpadam cross each other at Mulavukadu island. According to a rough estimate, around 10 lakh tonnes of metal was used for the project which involved erecting many stone columns as well as laying road metal filters.

== See also ==
- List of national highways in India
- National Highways Development Project
