= Chakkarakadavu =

- village
- Location in Kerala, India Chakkarakadavu (India)
- Coordinates: 10°8′35″N 76°11′50″E
- Country: India
- State: Kerala
- District: Ernakulam

Languages
  - Official: Malayalam, English
- Time zone: UTC+5:30 (IST)
- PIN: 683514
- Telephone code: 0484
- Nearest city: Kochi
- Climate: Tropical monsoon (Köppen)
- Avg. summer temperature: 35 °C (95 °F)
- Avg. winter temperature: 20 °C (68 °F)

Chakkarakadavu is a small village to the east of the town of Cherai, on Vypin Island in Ernakulam district, Kerala, India.

Chakkarakadavu shares a common history with Cherai and with the greater Vypin Island. It is the birthplace of Mathai Manjooran, an Indian independence activist from Kerala and the staunchest proponent for the formation of the Kerala State.
