= Chittoor Sree Krishnaswamy Temple =

Coordinates: 10.0333°N 76.2733°E

Religion
- Affiliation: Hinduism
- District: Kochi
- Deity: Lord Krishna

Location
- Location: South Chittoor
- State: Kerala
- Country: India
- Interactive map of Chittoor Sree Krishnaswamy Temple

Architecture
- Completed: 13th century

Chittoor Sree Krishnaswamy Temple, located at South Chittoor in the city of Kochi, Kerala, India, is a temple dedicated to Lord Krishna. It is a major temple under the Cochin Devaswom Board. For centuries the temple was closely associated with the Kartha family of Cheranelloor Swaroopam and was later taken over by Rama Varma Maharaja of Cochin Royal Family. It is a classic example of Kerala temple architecture.

The sreekovil or sanctum sanctorum is square in shape, with a pyramidal roof covered with copper plates. Similar to the idol at Guruvayoor, the idol of Lord Krishna faces east in standing posture with 4 arms, carrying the conch named Panchajanyam, Sudarshana Chakra, Lotus and Gada. There is a small shrine of Lord Shiva and Lord Ganesh to the right of the inner sanctum. The outer sanctum is built with tiled roof, houses the temple kitchen, storage and preparation areas. The shrines of Ayyappan, Naga, Brahmarakshas and Bhagavathi are located outside the outer sanctum, but within the complex. The shrine of Lord Hanuman is located outside the west entrance to the complex. The temple pond, called Agnihotratheertham lies to the north of the complex. There is a huge statue of kaaliya mardanam, where Lord Krishna is shown standing on the hood of a huge serpent. This is in reference to the legend of the serpent Kaliya being banished by Lord Krishna.

== History ==
The history of this temple dates back to the 13th century. It was built by the head of the local ruling family, the Cheranelloor Swaroopam - Cheranelloor Karthas. The men of this family were known by the title kartha. Around seven centuries ago, Narayanan Kartha (Another version says the name was Raman Kartha), a young member of the family, became an ardent devotee of Lord Krishna, and moved to Guruvayoor to be near the famous temple there. Eventually, he became the head of the family by succession, which required him to move back to the family seat in order to discharge his responsibilities as the head and ruler. Split between his devotion to Lord Krishna, and the responsibility to his family and subjects, Narayanan prayed to Lord Krishna for guidance. He had a vision in his dream that the lord has promised to accompany him, by embedding into an umbrella, and he was expected to build a shrine where he puts the umbrella down. Travelling back to his home, he happened to put the umbrella down at the present temple site, which was close to his home. Eventually, he built a temple at the site. It was modeled after the Guruvayoor temple, and the chief priest of Guruvayoor was invited to conduct the installation of the deity.

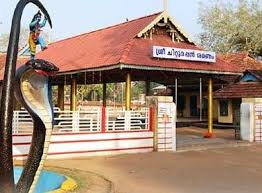

The subsequent generations of the family showed great reverence for the temple, and built it up further. Later, as the Cochin Royal Family became prominent, they took over the administration of the temple. When the kingdom acceded to the Indian Union, management of the temple was transferred to the Cochin Devaswom Board.

== Pooja Timings ==
Palliyunarthal	3.00 AM
Nada Opens	4.00 AM
Nirmalyam	4.05 AM
Enna Adal	4.15 AM
Vakacharth	4.20 AM
Sankabiskekam	4.30 AM
Malar Nivedhyam	4.45 AM
Usha Pooja	5.00 AM
Ethirtha Pooja	6.00 AM
Ethritha Siveli	6.30 AM
Panthiradi Pooja	7.30 AM
Ucha Pooja	10.30 AM
Ucha Siveli	10.45 AM
Nada Closes	11.00 AM
Nada Opens	4.30 PM
Deeparadhana	After Sunset
Athazha Pooja	7.30 PM
Athazha Siveli	8.00 PM
Thripuka	8.10 PM
Nada Closes	8.30 PM

== Offerings ==
Aadiya Enna, Puvan/Kadali Pazham, Kalabhabhishekam, Pushpabhishekam, Palpayasam, Sahasranamarchana, Neyvilakku, etc. are the main offerings of Lord Krishna. Vedi Vazhipadu, Turmeric and Kumkum, Guruthy and Chanthattam are the main offerings for Bhagavathi. Pinvilakku, Dhara, Koovalamala, etc. are the main offerings of Lord Shiva. Lord Ganesh has Ganapathi Homam as his main offering. Ayyappan has Neerajanam as his main offering. Nagas have Noorum Palum and Rakshas has Palpayasam.

== Location ==
The temple is located in the village of South Chittoor, 6 km from Erankulam North, surrounded by coconut lagoons, in the north western part of the city of Kochi, Ernakulam District, Kerala. The temple is well connected by rail and road, with the nearest railway station at Ernakulam Town and reached by Chittoor Road.

== See also ==
- Temples of Kerala
