= Vypin =

Suburban Island in Kochi

- Island
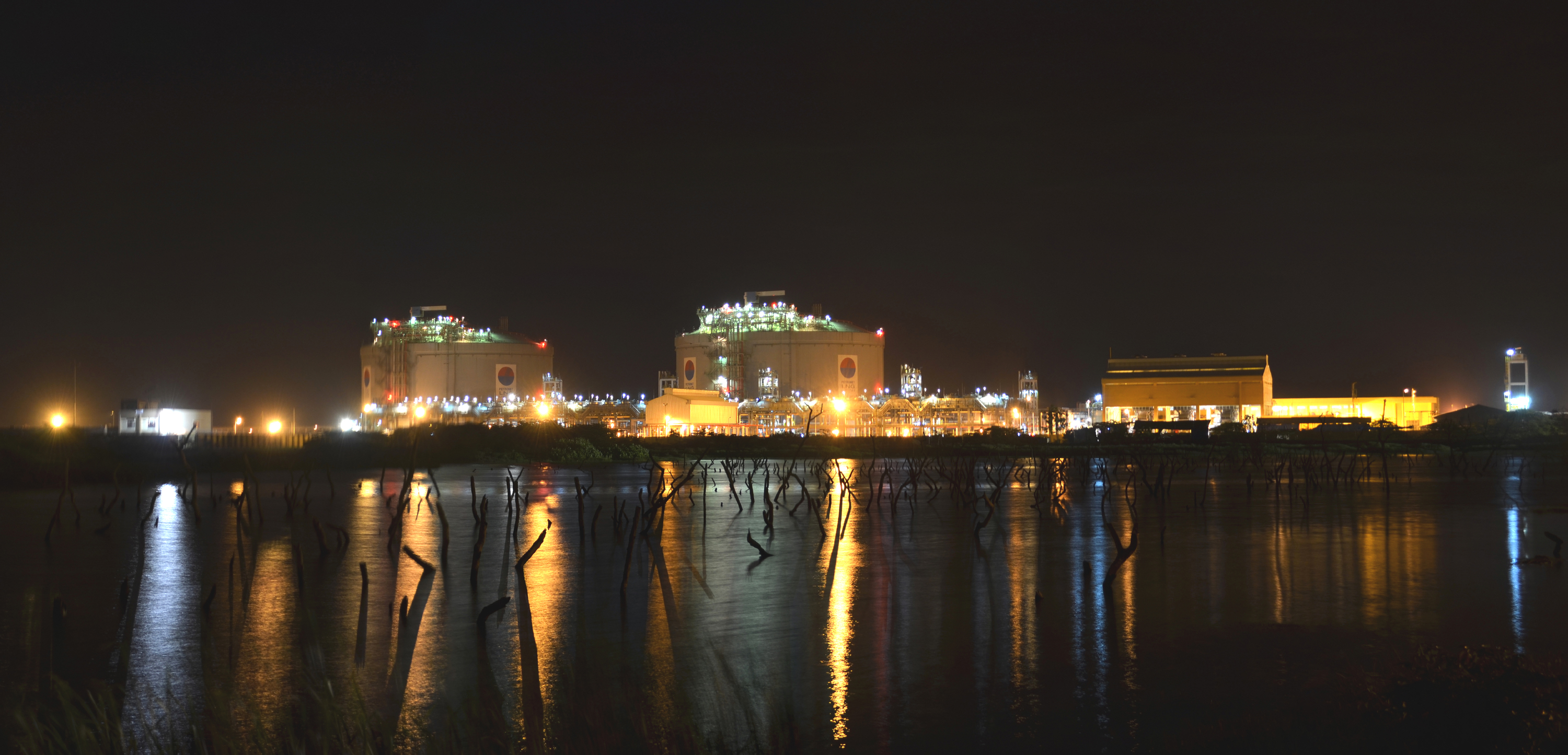
- Sunset at LNG Terminal in Vypin

- Location in Kerala, India Vypin (India)
- Country: India
- State: Kerala

Government
  - Body: Vypin Block Panchayat

Languages
  - Official: Malayalam, English
- Time zone: UTC+5:30 (IST)

Vypin (IPA: [ʋɐi̯pːin], Cochin Portuguese: Isla Santa) is one of the group of islands that form part of the city of Kochi, in the Indian state of Kerala.

Vypin forms a barrier island which lies between the Arabian Sea in the west and the Kerala backwaters (Cochin backwaters) formed by the various distributaries of Periyar river, in the east. The northernmost end of the island lies on the estuary of the Periyar river in Muziris (Kodungallur), and the southernmost end in the mouth of the Cochin backwaters in Kalamukku near Fort Vypin.

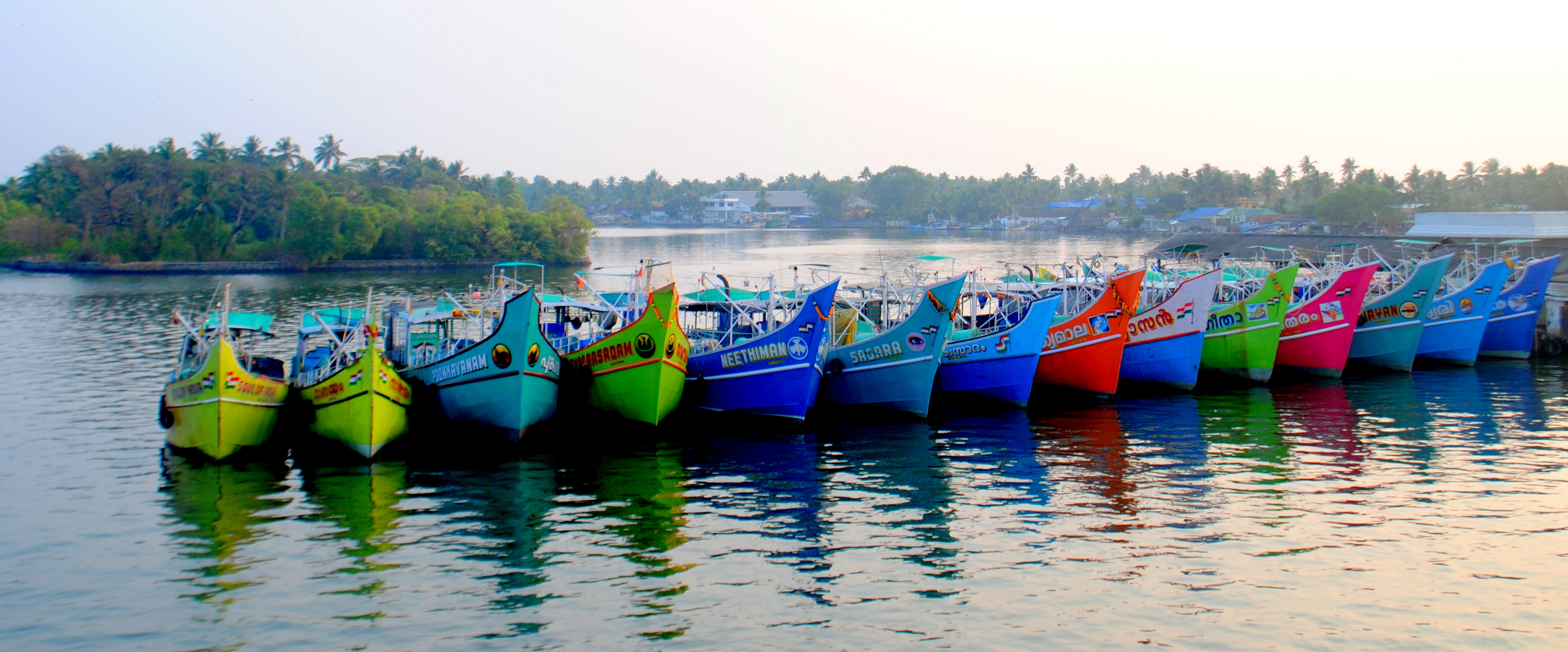
Fishing boats from Vypin

The island is about 27 kilometres (17 mi) long and is connected to mainland Kochi by a series of bridges known as the Goshree bridges, which start at Kalamukku in Vypin, touch other two islands and then finish at Marine Drive covering a total distance of around three km (1.9 mi). Vypin is 58th most densely populated islands in the world. Njarakkal is one of the most densely populated locations within Vypin.

== Development ==
At far the northern tip of Vypin, is home to the Munambam Fishing Harbour, the largest fishing harbour in Kochi. Puthuvype has become the major industrial hub in Kerala and the fastest growing city suburb due to the SPM project run by Kochi Refineries, an offshore pumping station of Kochi Port, the Puthuvyp LNG Terminal, the IOC Bottling Plant and the proposed Oceanarium.

There are ten lighthouses in Kerala, one of which is situated at Puthuvype Beach and is the tallest in Kerala.

India's first international container trans-shipment terminal (ICTT) in the Special Economic Zone at Vallarpadam Island, designed to handle the largest container ships, was opened by then Prime Minister Manmohan Singh on 11 February 2011.

There are regular boat services from Fort Kochi to Vypin Island. In 2004 a bridge was built by the Goshree Islands Development Authority (GIDA) to connect Vypin to the mainland. The Goshree bridges also connect the islands Mulavukad and Vallarpadam.

Vypin is a fast-developing suburb of Kochi City. Today, all the infrastructure of modern living is available in Vypin. Travellers from North Kerala can use the Vypin–Munambam state highway to reach Ernakulam.

== History ==
The island was formed in 1341 following a heavy flood.

== Gram Panchayats of Vypin ==
- Pallippuram
- Kuzhuppilly
- Edavanakkad
- Nayarambalam
- Njarackal
- Elamkunnapuzha

== Revenue Villages of Vypin ==
- Pallippuram
- Kuzhuppilly
- Edavanakkad
- Nayarambalam
- Njarackal
- Elamkunnapuzha
- Puthuvype (part of Elamkunnappuzha panchayat)

=== Other Villages ===
- Cherai (part of Pallippuram panchayat)
- Munambam (part of Pallippuram panchayat)
- Chakkarakadavu (part of Pallippuram panchayat)
- Ayyamppilly (part of Kuzhuppilly panchayat)
- Nedungad (part of Nayarambalam panchayat)
- Perumpilly (part of Narakkal panchayat)
- Malippuram (part of Elamkunnappuzha panchayat)
- Valappu (part of Elamkunnappuzha panchayat)
- Ochanthuruth (part of Elamkunnappuzha panchayat)
- Murikumpadam (part of Elamkunnappuzha panchayat)
- Fort Vypin (part of Kochi Municipal Corporation)
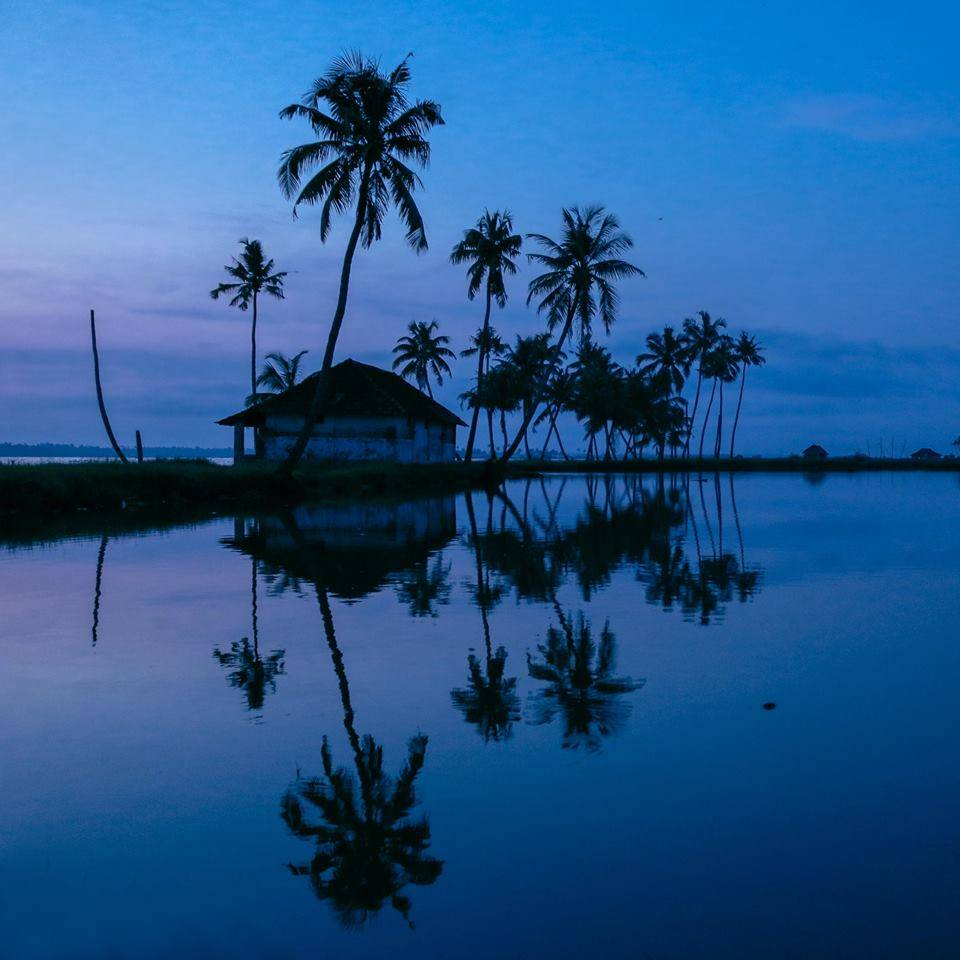
Nedungad

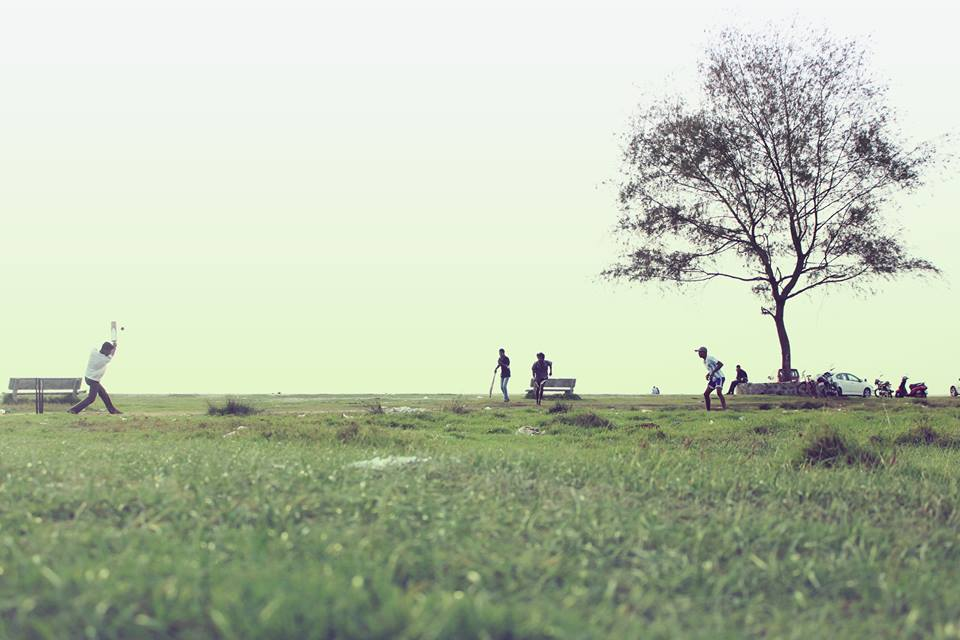
Cricket at Puthyvypin Beach

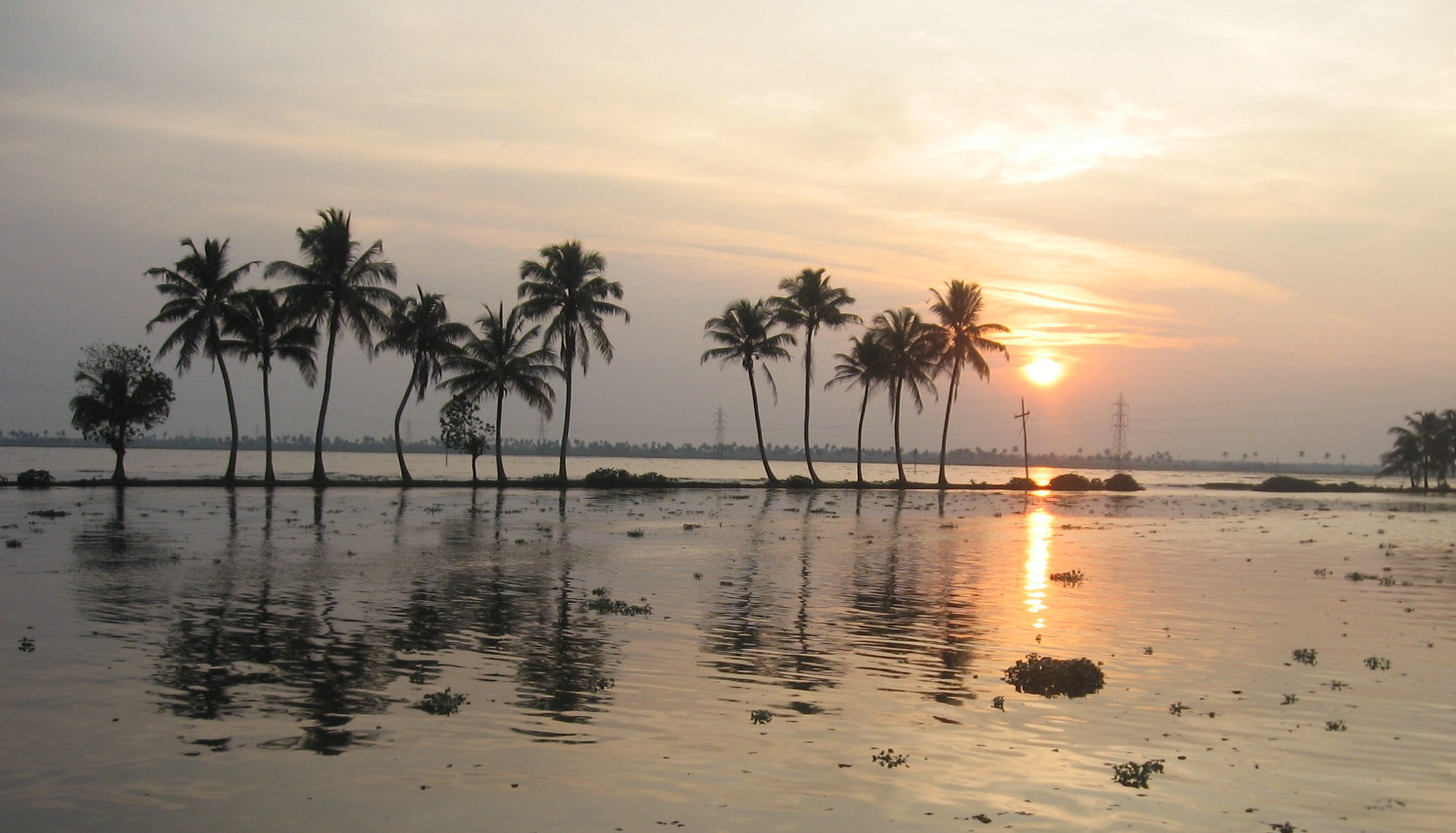
Vembanad Kayal

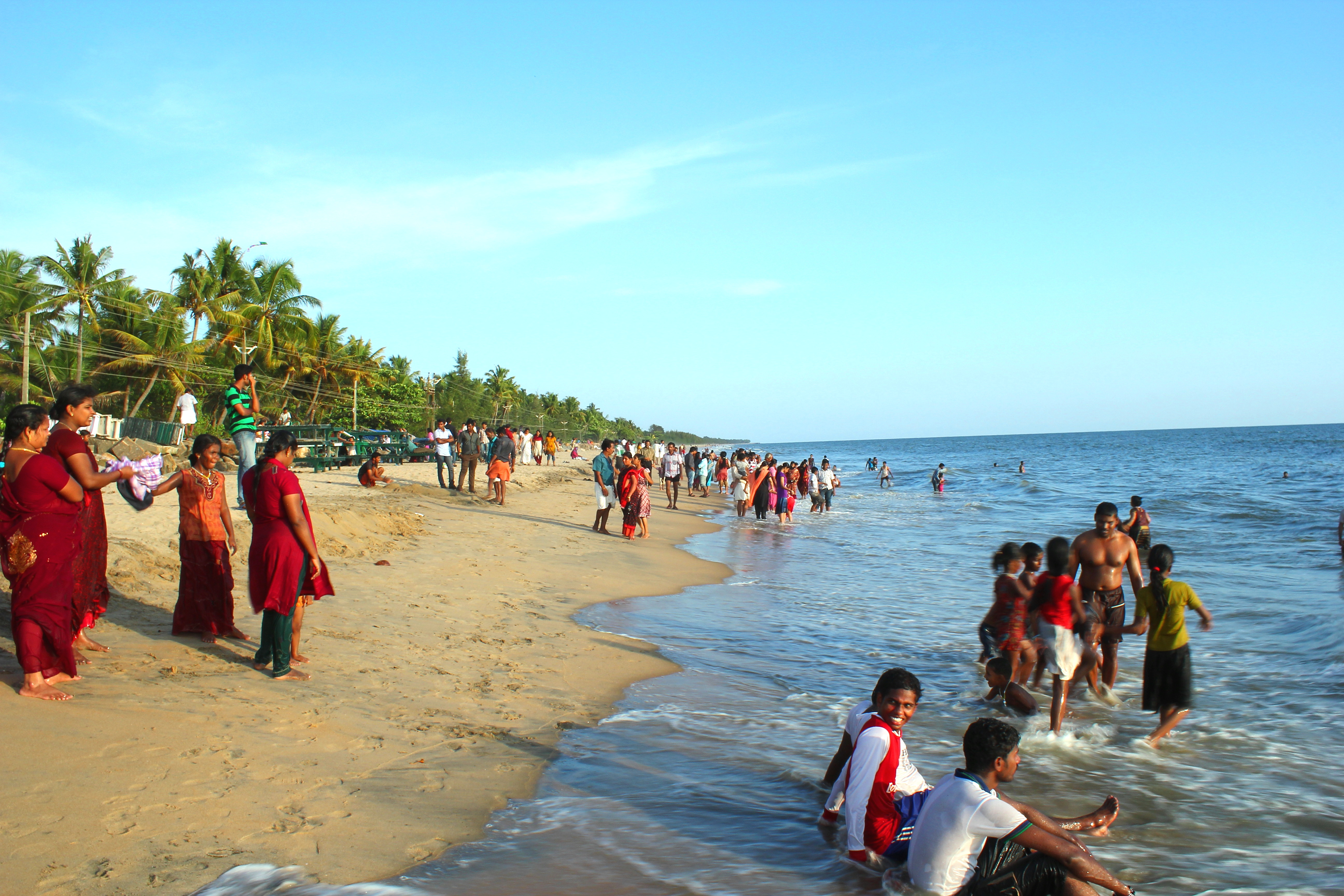
Cherai Beach

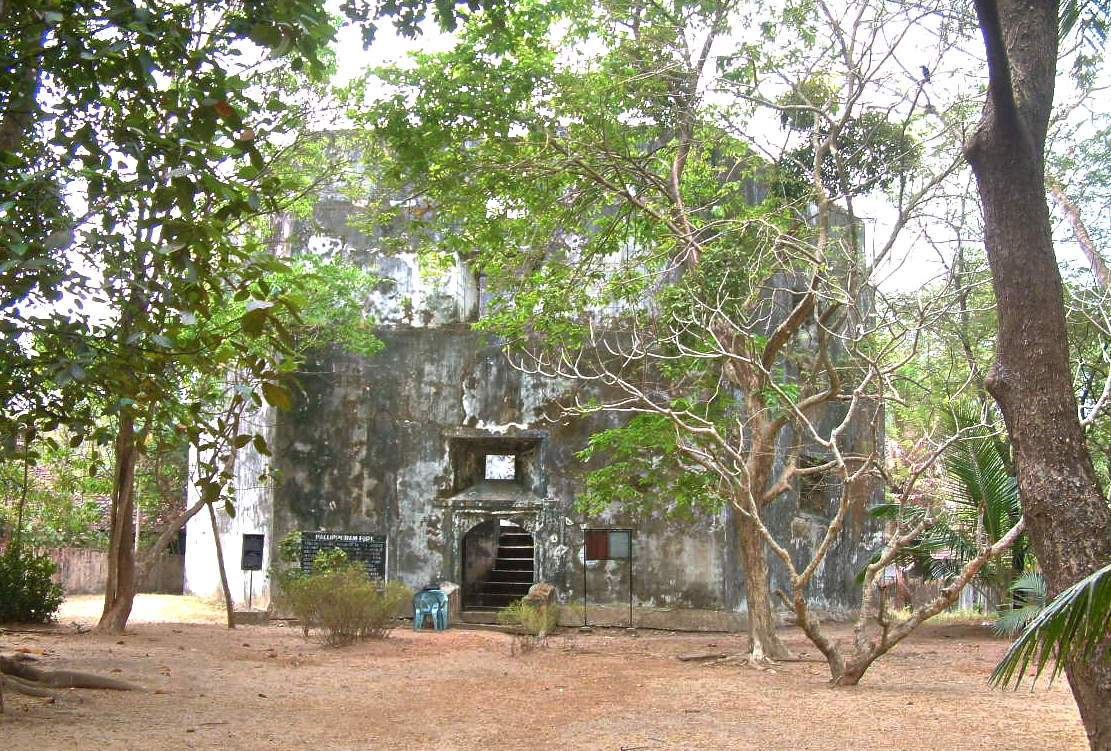
Pallipuram Fort

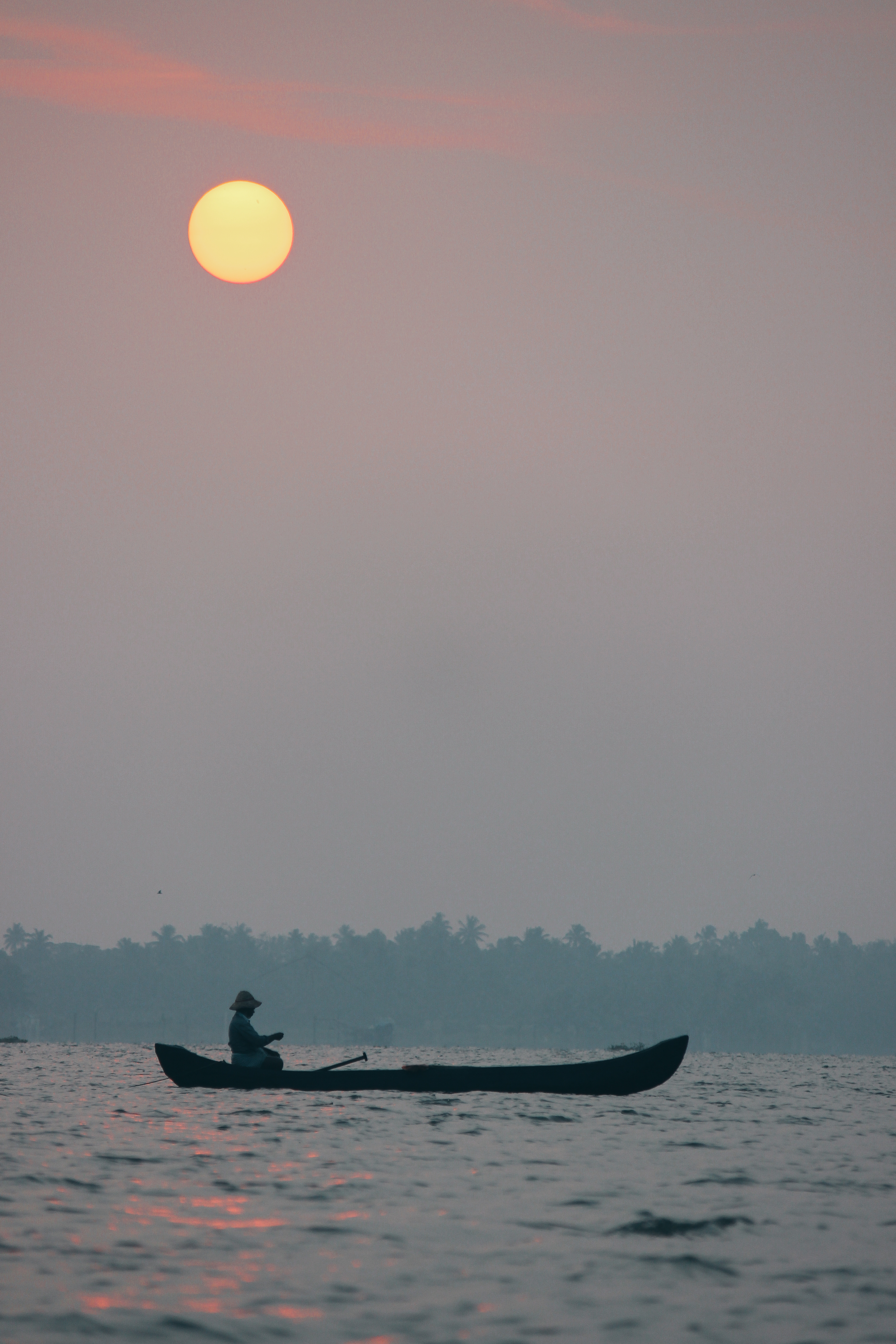
Sunrise at Veeranpuzha

== See also ==
- 1982 Vypeen hooch tragedy
- Mulavukad Grama Panchayat
- Njarackal
- Tourism in India
