= Goshree bridges =

System of bridges in Kochi, Kerala, India

Coordinates: 9.990°N 76.261°E

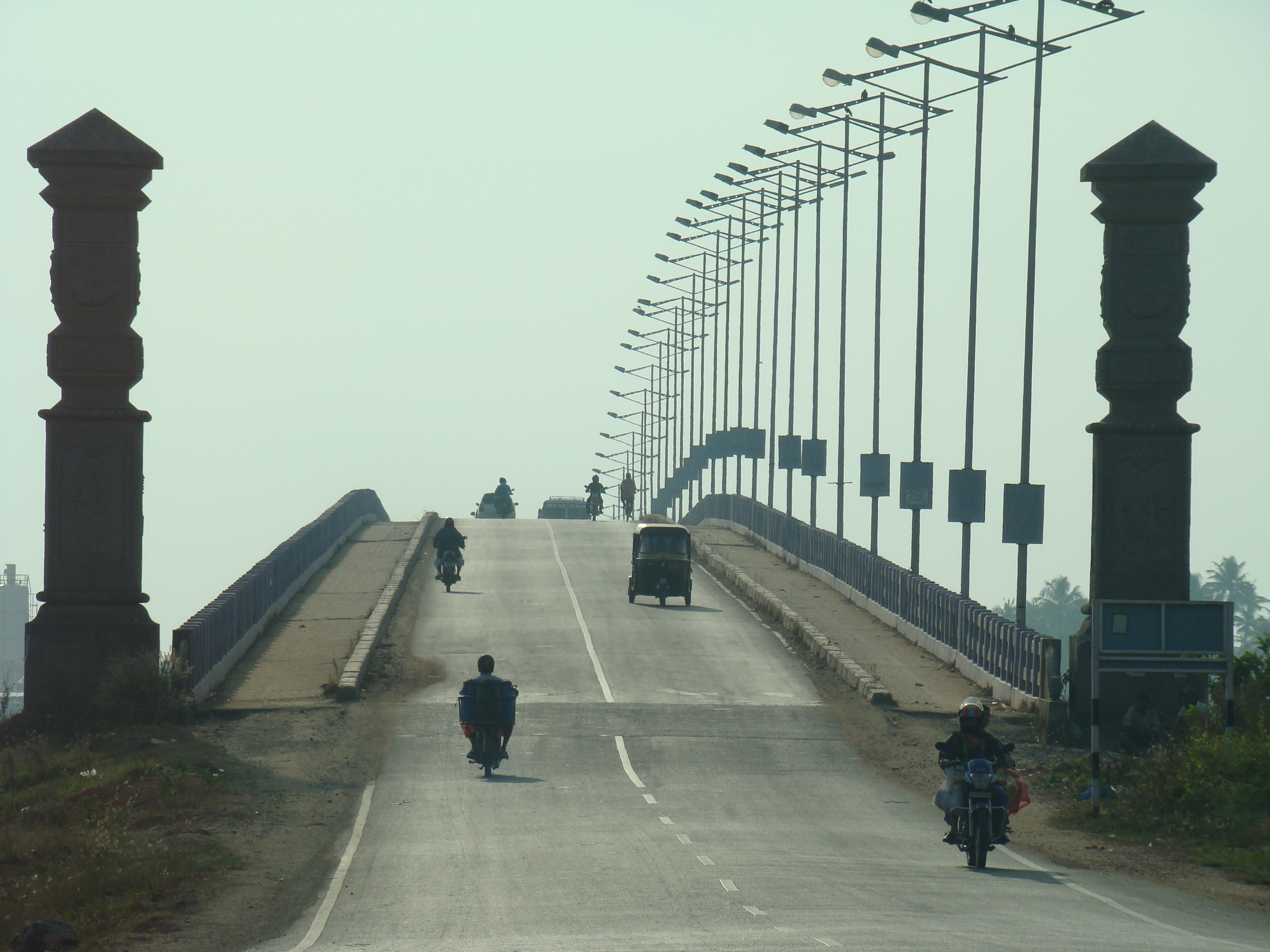
Goshree bridge kochi.jpg

Gosree bridges is a system of three bridges that link the mainland side of the city of Kochi to the islands lying to the north of the backwaters. It provides the vital road connectivity to the islands of Bolgatty and Vallarpadam and also links the western island of Vypin to the mainland. The bridges start from the northern end of Marine Drive between High Court and Pachalam.

The bridges were constructed under the supervision of the Goshree Islands Development Authority (GIDA), constituted by the Government of Kerala. The first bridge was opened in December 2003. All three bridges were formally opened on 5 June 2004.

== History ==
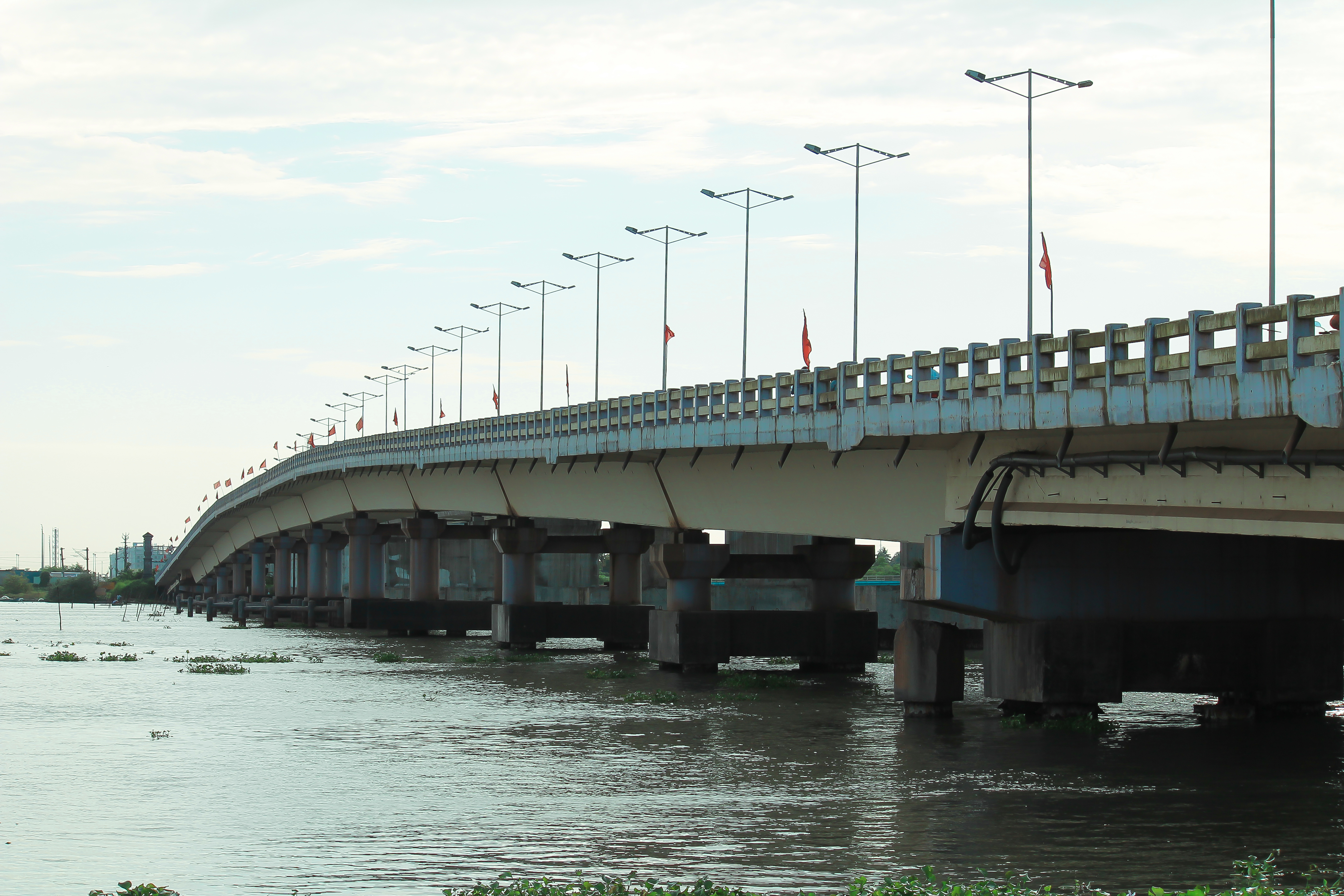
Goshree bridges segment 2

The Goshree bridges project took concrete shape after the formation of the Goshree Islands Development Authority in 1994. The authority decided to reclaim 25 hectares of backwaters, the sale of which would finance the bridges project. The foundation stone was laid on 29 December 2000 and first segment between Ernakulam and Bolgatty was opened on 29 December 2003. The segment between Bolgatty and Vallarpadam was opened on 10 February 2004. The last segment was completed on 17 March 2004 and the entire bridge was formally opened on 5 June.

The bridge is the only means road connectivity to the Bolgatty and Vallarpadam islands. The launching of the International Container Transshipment Terminal was made possible by these bridges. It also provides direct road connectivity to the city for the Vypin island and the suburbs to the northwest, which was relying upon ferry services earlier. Cherian Varkey Construction company was involved in its construction.

== See also ==
- Venduruthy Bridge
- Mattancherry Bridge
