= Upasana Vaduthala =

Vaduthala is a historic village in Arookutty in Alappuzha district in the state of Kerala, India, 50 km from the Kochi International Airport.

== Facilities ==
There were many Shopping complexes including Hotel Adayadance, Vaduthala Jama-ath Higher Secondary School, Vaduthala Central Juma Masjid, SBI Arookutty, Nadvathul Islam society which is located less than 1 km from the Vaduthala Junction.

== About the Nadvathul Islam society ==
"Nadvathul Islam" (Regd) Vaduthala has been Registered under the Travancore – Cochin Literary, Scientific and Charitable societies Registration Act, XII of 1955 vide registration No. 11 / 1963, dated 28.05.1963. though the society has received registration on 1963 but it was started in 1938 itself with a small Mosque. The place has the Nadvathul Islam orphanage, the Nadvathul Islam U.P SCHOOL, the Nadvathul Islam English school and the Nadvathul Islam Madrasa.
