= Vaduthala =

- Location in Kerala, India
- Coordinates: 10.0207°N 76.2741°E
- Country: India
- State: Kerala
- District: Ernakulam

Languages
  - Official: Malayalam, English
- Time zone: UTC+5:30 (IST)
- Telephone code: 0484
- Vehicle registration: KL-07
- Coastline: 0 kilometres (0 mi)
- Climate: Tropical monsoon (Köppen)
- Avg. summer temperature: 35 °C (95 °F)
- Avg. winter temperature: 20 °C (68 °F)

Vaduthala is a locality in the city of Kochi, India. It consists of the wards Vaduthala East and Vaduthala West. It is in between Pachalam and Chittoor on Chittoor Road. Elamakkara lies towards its east and Mulavukad Island lies on its west. A zonal office of the Corporation of Cochin operates here. Several educational institutions such as the Chinmaya Vidyalaya, Don Bosco School and Archbishop Attipetty Public School operate there. The nearest hospital is Lourdes Hospital.

== Backwaters ==
Vaduthala has a line of backwaters along its length. It is a source of livelihood for a number of fishermen living here. There are plans to fill up part of the backwaters with roads and to generate revenue for the Corporation of Cochin. Vaduthala has a hospital, schools, temples, mosques and a church.

== Don Bosco Trophy Football tournament 1956- ==
The Don Bosco Trophy Football Tournament established in 1956 was recognized by the Kerala Football Association in 1962. It was founded by Rev. Fr. Francis Gueouz, a French Salesian priest who came to Kerala. He established the Don Bosco in Vaduthala and Kochi in the same year. The first thing he did as he arrived was to cut the coconut trees and make a playground for youngsters. From the very first year, the football tournament started. By the second year onwards, reputed teams in Ernakulam and its vicinity started coming. This tournament is the second oldest recognized football tournament in India after Durant Cup. It has been occurring for the past years as a registered tournament in which reputed clubs of Kerala and Ernakulam participate in it. Olden days tournaments used to last for months. Usually,the tournament occurs in the month of December. Bolgatty club, FACT Udayaogamandel, Udaya, Eagles, Don Bosco, Central Exercise, Golden Treads, Cochin Port etc., are some of the prominent teams that has raised the prestigious Don Bosco trophy cup. This cup is made of Silver in which the image of Don Bosco is imprinted. The winners will be awarded the Don Bosco Trophy and a permanent trophy.

== Don Bosco Football Academy ==
Don Bosco Football Academy, a hallmark name in the Hero National Y-League, is a Salesian initiative adorning a legacy of fair play beginning in the year 2016. With a well-maintained home ground academy,it trains players to explore and love the game of football.

With the best Player Development Curriculum, the academy is in the path of generating an elite class of players and teams. Here, academy encourages the players to experiment and discover the game, so as to bring out his/her maximum potential. The players are engaged in tactical and technical training sessions that ensure the success of the player and the team.

"We play by the principles of the game" is the echoing ground rule of the academy. This ensures a focused approach on the individual players which in turn guarantees the growth of the player and success of the team. The laurels of the academy justify the quality training received by individual players. Academy got national accreditation by All India Football Federation with a one star rating and participated in the National Youth League 2017. Don Bosco Football Academy accomplished a groundbreaking entry into the field of competitive football tournaments with a 2-star accreditation by the All India Football Federation (AIFF) in 2018, 2019 and 2020. It is the topmost rated football academy in Kerala and holds the 16th position in India according to the accreditation done by AIFF.The academy has football fields, nursery, and grassroots. The training age groups are U-13, U-15 and U-18, which participates in Kerala Academy League and National Youth Leagues.The U-15 squad of Don Bosco FA won the Kerala Academy League title 2018–19 defeating Parapur FC 1–0. The U-13 squad achieved the runner up position in the Kerala Academy League 2018–2019.

Players display an astonishing level of self-determination and team spirit because the academy teaches them to be self-reliant, humble and excellent sportsmen.

== Transport ==
The railway line connecting the international shipping terminal to the airport passes through Vaduthala. A single main road leads to Vaduthala. The Don Bosco school conducts an annual fair.

Vaduthala is a suburb within Cochin Corporation lying on either side of the Chittoor Road (North part) between Pachalam and South Chittoor. It is connected by Chittoor Road from Ernakulam town. It is straddled by Cochin backwaters on one side and the Elamakkara/Perandur Canal on the other side with the Ernakulam-Alwaye railway line passing right through it.

== See also ==
- Upasana Vaduthala
