= Munambam =

- Village
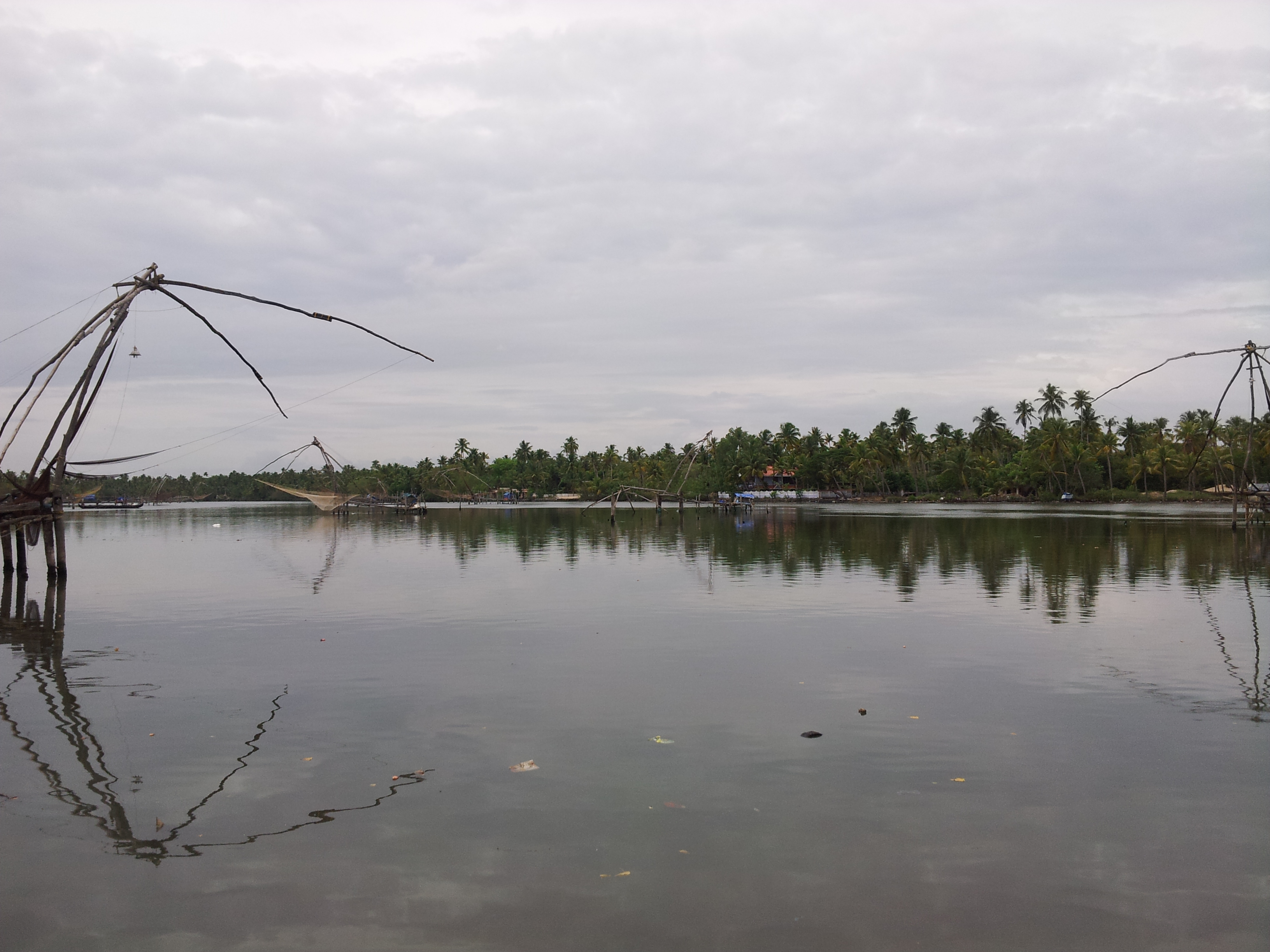
- Interactive map of Munambam
- Coordinates: 10.1767°N 76.1717°E
- Country: India
- State: Kerala
- District: Ernakulam

Government
  - Body: Pallipuram Grama Panchayat
- Elevation: 3 m (9.8 ft)

Languages
  - Official: Malayalam, English
- Time zone: UTC+5:30 (IST)
- Telephone code: 0484
- Vehicle registration: KL-42
- Nearest city: Kochi
- Lok Sabha constituency: Ernakulam
- Civic agency: Pallipuram

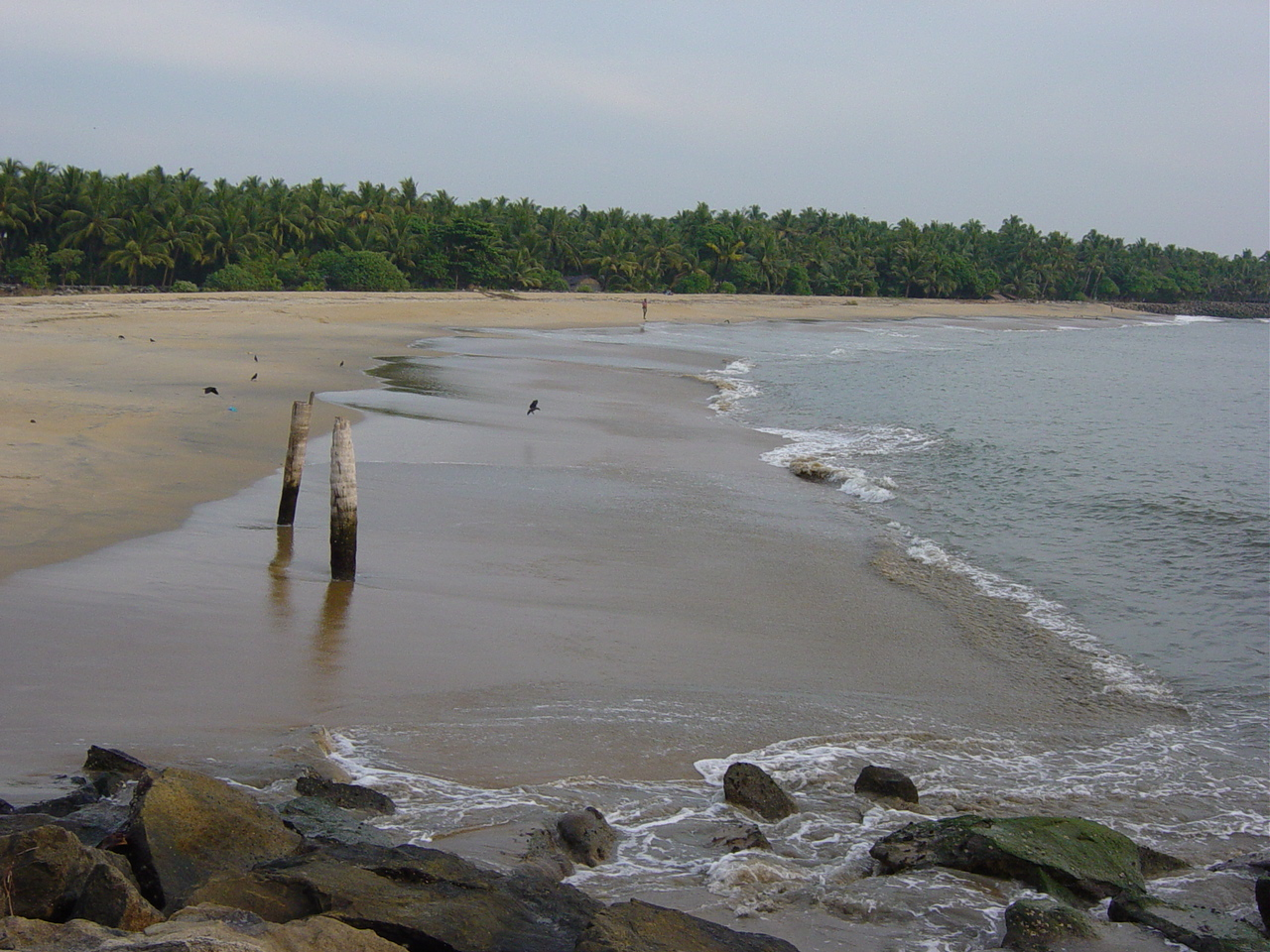
Munambam beach

Munambam is a suburb of Kochi, India at the north end of Vypeen Island, surrounded by the Arabian Sea on the west, Periyar river on the east, and a mouth of the sea on the north. The main occupation of its inhabitants is fishing and related activities. It is also the mouth of the district major river Periyar which can be seen from the Munambam Muziris beach.

Munambam is famous in Ernakulam and Thrissur districts for the presence of a major government-owned fishing harbour in this region. Munambam also houses a private mini-fishing harbour. Munambam and neighbouring villages have a large number of boat-making yards.

== Land Dispute ==
The village has been in the middle of a controversy since 2019. The Munambam land dispute centres on a 404-acre stretch along the Munambam coast in Ernakulam district, where around 600 Latin Catholics and Hindu families have lived for generations. In 2019, the Waqf Board claimed ownership of the land, citing a Waqf deed dating back to 1950. The Kerala State Waqf Board asserted ownership over the property, which had been endowed as Waqf (an inalienable trust under Islamic law) to an educational institution in Kozhikode. Descendants of individuals who later bought the land from this institution face possible eviction.

On October 10, 2025, a Division Bench ruled that the Waqf Board’s 2019 declaration identifying the land as waqf was “bad in law” and “palpably violative” of several provisions of the Waqf Acts.

== See also ==
- Ernakulam District
- Vypin
- North Paravur
- Cherai
