= Bolgatty Palace and Island Resort =

Former palace, now a heritage hotel resort, in Kochi, India

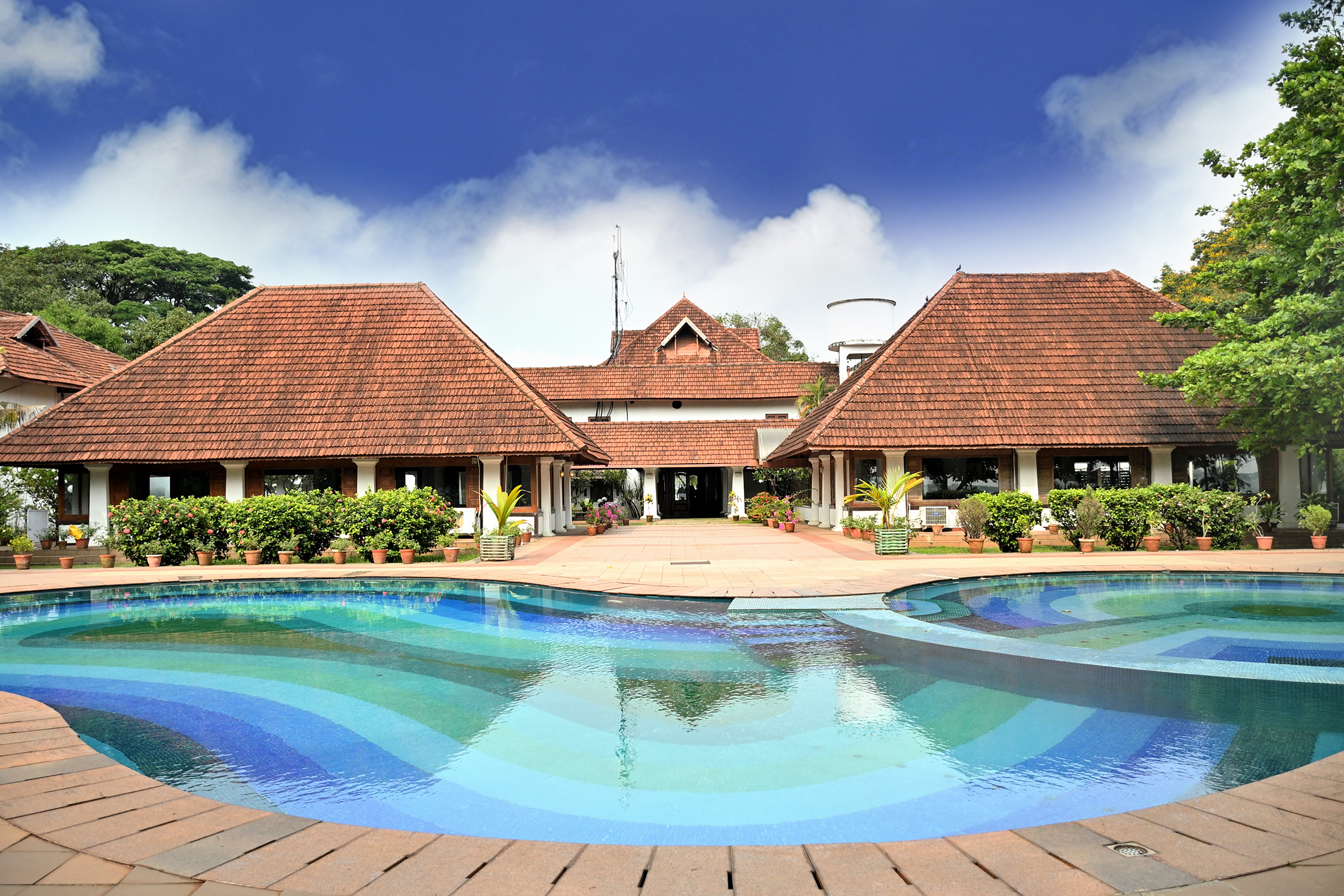
- Bolgatty Palace Hotel from outside
- Interactive map of the Bolgatty Palace and Island Resort area

General information
- Architectural style: Dutch
- Location: Mulavukad, Kochi, Kerala, India
- Opened: 1744 (as palace); 1976 (as heritage hotel resort)
- Owner: KTDC

Other information
- Number of rooms: 60

Website
- Official website

Bolgatty Palace is a former palace built by the Dutch in India on Mulavukad (known locally as Bolgatty Island) in Kochi, Kerala, India. It is believed to be one among the oldest Dutch palaces outside of the Netherlands. The palace was converted and opened as a heritage hotel resort in 1976 as Bolgatty Palace and Island Resort by the Kerala Tourism Development Corporation.

== History ==
The palace was built in 1744 by Dutch traders and later extended and gardens were landscaped around it. The building was then the Governor's palace for the commander of Dutch Malabar, and in 1909, was leased to the British. It served as the home of the British governors, being the seat of the British Resident of Kochi during the British Raj.

In 1947, when India attained independence, the palace became the property of the state. It was converted into a heritage hotel resort and opened in 1976.

== Facilities ==
Bolgatty Palace has a swimming pool, 9-hole golf course, ayurvedic centre, daily Kathakali performances, and is a holiday destination for tourists.

== Gallery ==
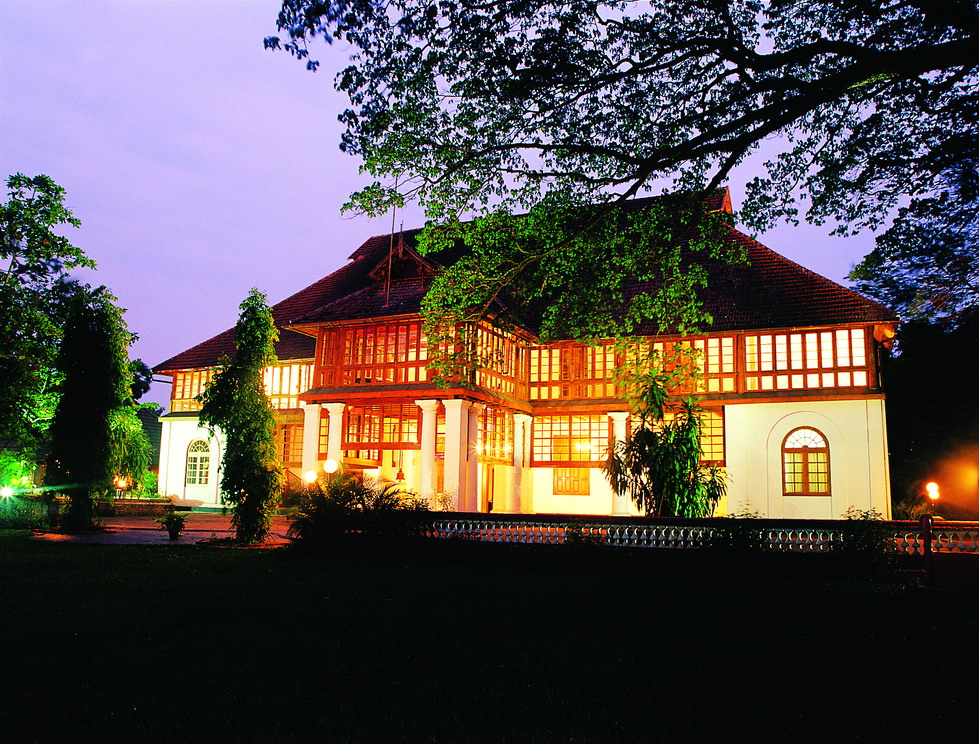
Bolgatty Palace illuminated

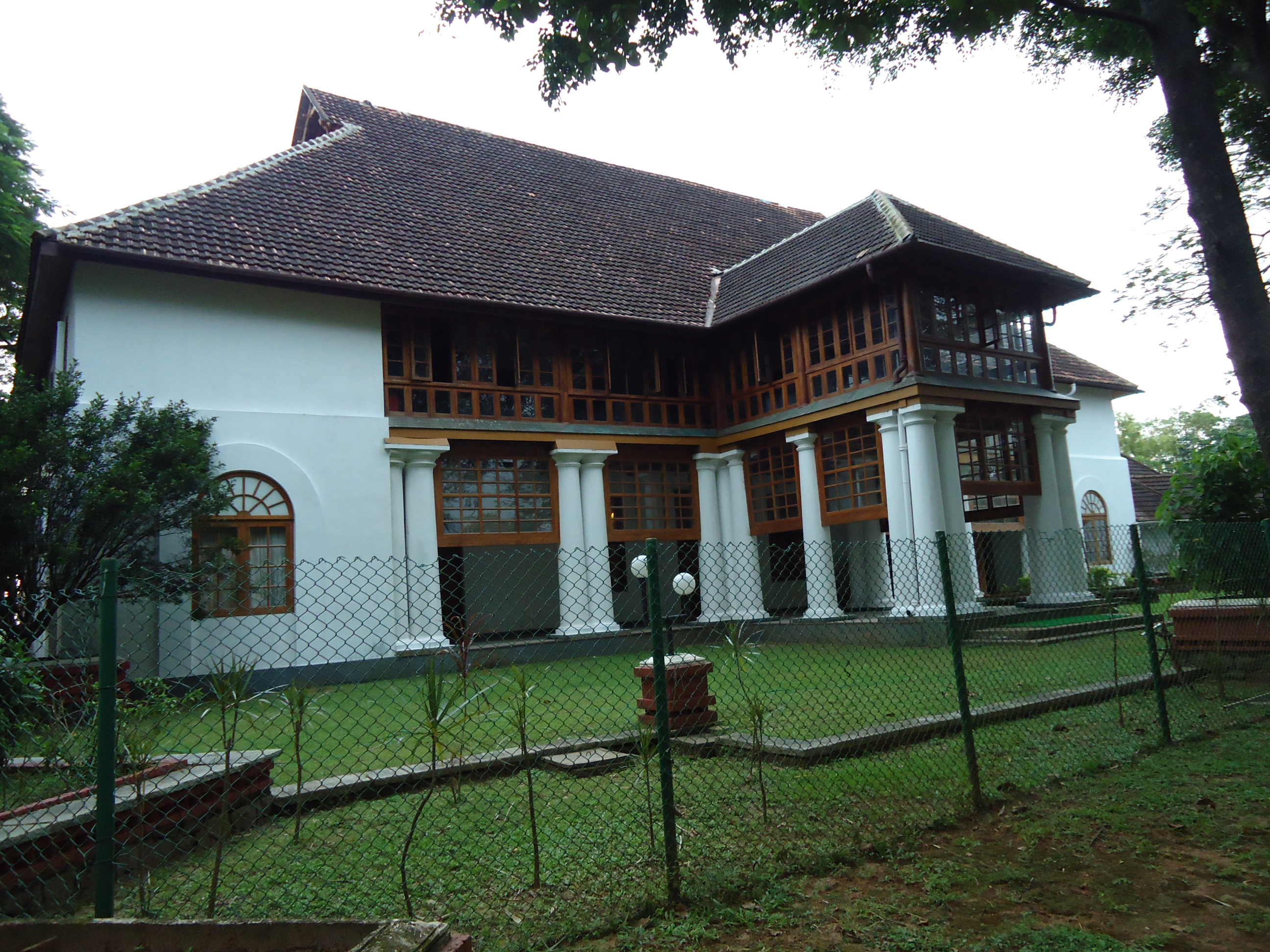
Bolgatty Palace side view

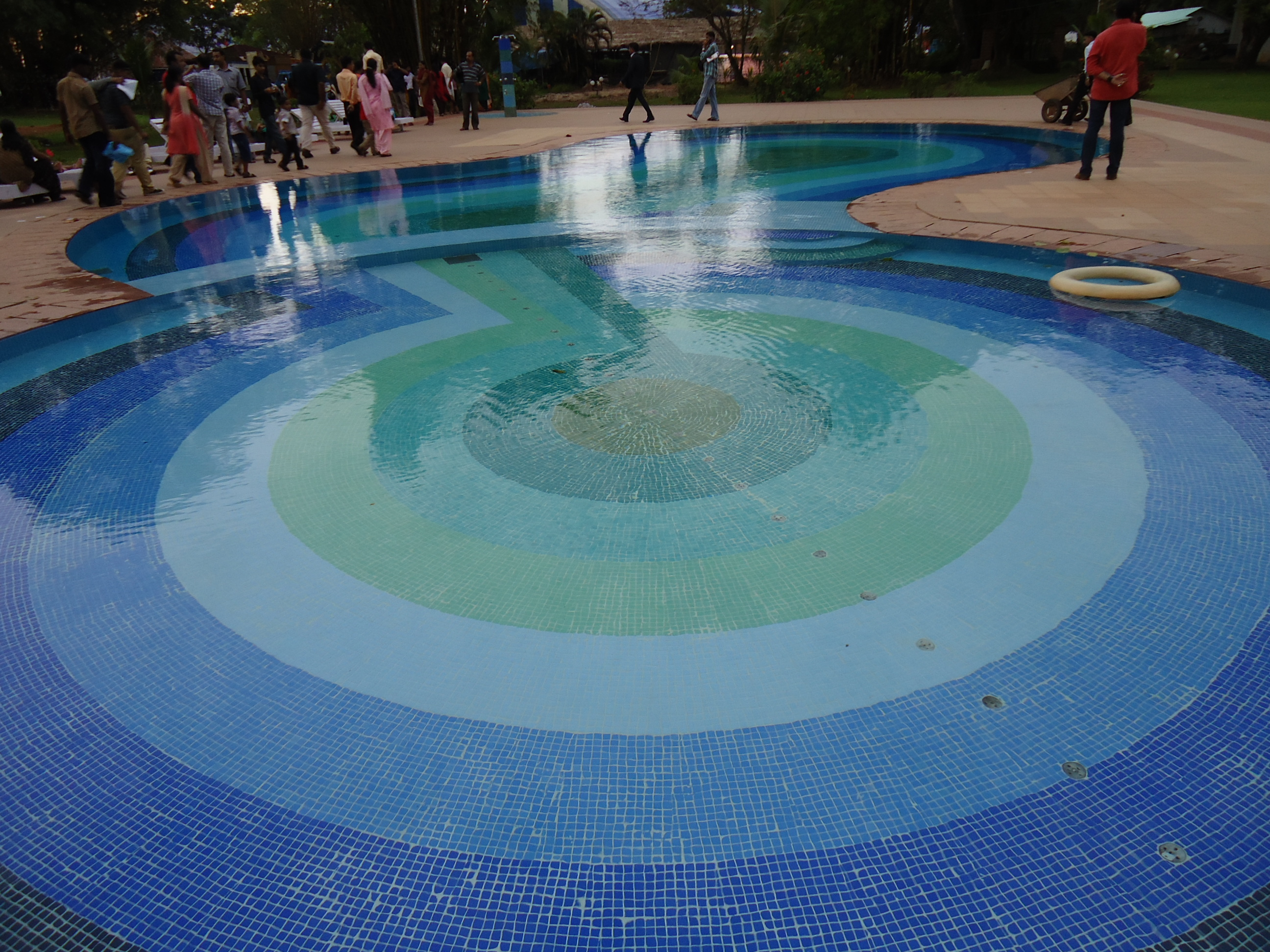
Bolgatty Palace swimming pool

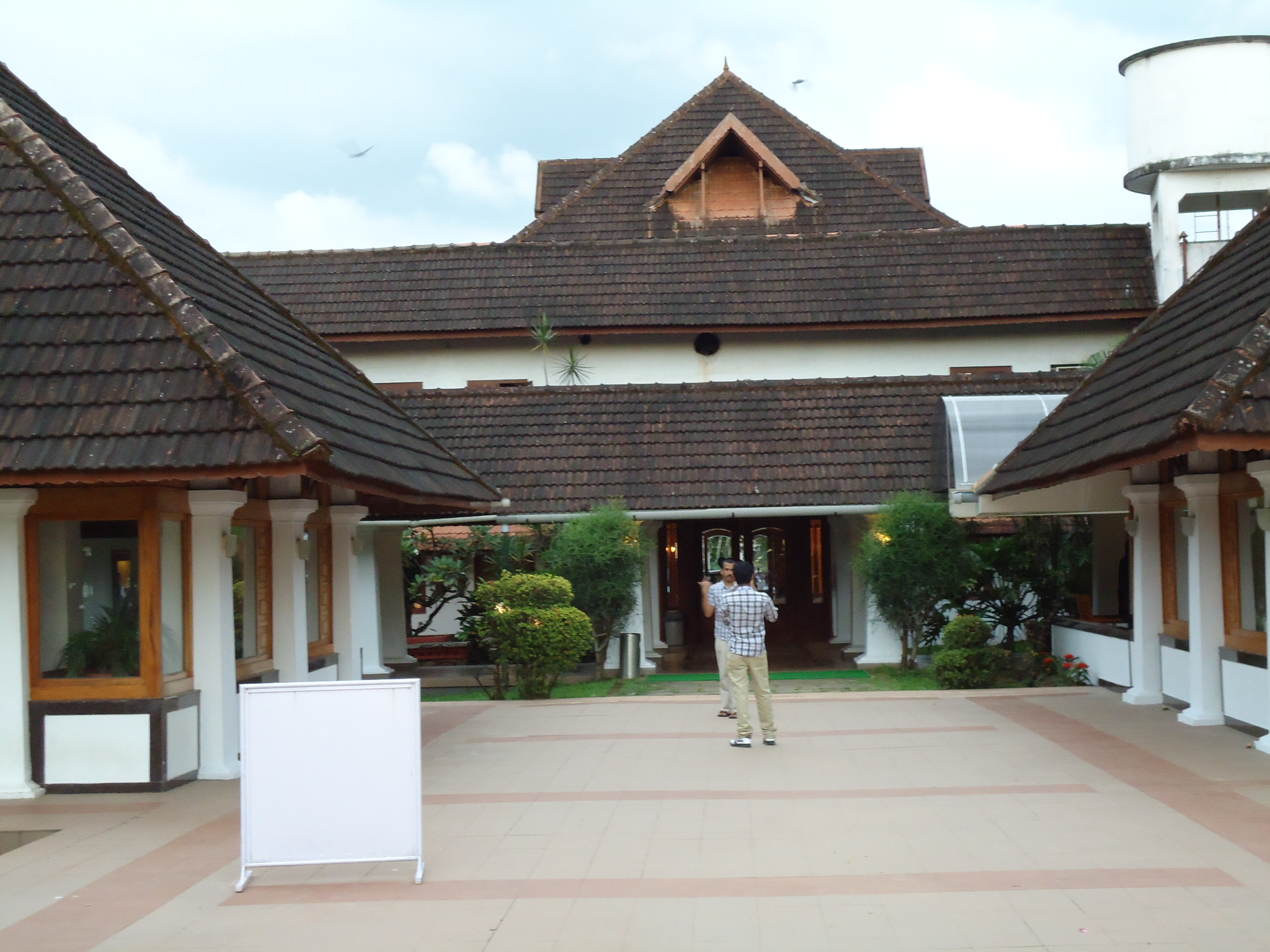
Bolgatty Palace back side

== See also ==
- Government Houses of India
- Government Houses of the British Empire
- Brunton Boatyard
- Grand Hyatt Kochi
