= Edappally railway station =

Railway station in Kerala, India

Edappally Railway Station

General information
- Location: Edappally, Kochi, Kerala; India
- Coordinates: 10.035°N 76.299°E
- System: Indian Railway Station
- Owner: Indian Railways
- Line: Shoranur–Cochin Harbour section
- Platforms: 3
- Tracks: 7
- Connections: EDAPPALLY

Construction
- Structure type: STANDARD
- Depth: 1,900 ft (580 m)
- Platform levels: 2
- Parking: YES
- Cycle facilities: YES

Other information
- Station code: IPL
- Fare zone: Southern Railway

History
- Opened: 1902
- Closed: -
- Rebuilt: 2006

Passengers
- 90,000

Services
Preceding station	Indian Railways	Following station
Kalamassery towards Shoranur Junction	Southern Railway zone Shoranur–Cochin Harbour section	Ernakulam Town towards Cochin Harbour Terminus
Route map
Location
- Location within India Location within Kerala

Edappally railway station (station code: IPL) is an NSG–6 category Indian railway station in Thiruvananthapuram railway division of Southern Railway zone. It is a railway station of the Southern Railway zone in Edappally, Kochi, India. This station handles mainly passenger trains in Shoranur–Cochin Harbour section and a few express trains. The railway station is located about 6 km from Ernakulam Town, 9 km from Ernakulam Junction and 11 km from Aluva railway stations. Rail connectivity to the ICTT Vallarpadom Terminal starts from Edappally with route length of 8.86 km.

== Notable trains stopping at the station ==
- Alappuzha–Chennai Express
- Tea Garden Express
- Amritha Express
- Ernakulam Junction-Palakkad Junction MEMU
- Ernakulam Junction-Shoranur Junction MEMU
