= Chittoor Road =

Major road in Kochi, Kerala, India

Chittor Road
- Location: Kochi
- Length: 8 km (5.0 mi)

Chittoor Road is one of the major arterial road in the city of Kochi, India. It is the oldest arterial road in the Ernakulam mainland city that connects Ernakulam south with Chittoor island in Ernakulam north. The road runs in north–south direction parallel to coast, covering a distance of 8.2 kilometres (5.1 mi). The road was named after Chittoor Sree Krishnaswamy Temple as the road ends before the main gate of the temple.

== History ==
=== Background ===
The Chittoor Road was the oldest road in the Ernakulam town. The road was reported to be constructed in mid-1620s prior to arrival of Dutch to Kochi. The road was constructed to facilitate Kochi Maharaja's annual pilgrimage from the mainland to Chittoor temple. There are no recorded or written histories about this road. However the popular folklore states that King Veera Kerala Varma II's leg was seriously injured in a bomb shell due to Dutch siege of Fort Kochi. Soon he was moved to Ernakulam Palace for the safety of Royal family. Though he was able to walk after intensive treatment, he couldn't achieve full recovery. It was this time, a physician from Chittoor island came to meet the King and offered an oil for regular massage. Though the king didn't believe in the claims of the unknown physician, he thought to give a try. Within months after application of the oil, the king was able to walk with ease. He decided to search for the physician by sending soldiers to Chittoor island to bring him to the Palace. However the efforts of search parties vain and the king himself came down and seek public's help in locating the unknown physician. It was later found that, it was none other the lord of Chittoor (Chittoorappan) came in disguise to help the king from the pain. The King became an adherent devotee of the lord and ordered for reconstructing the temple. The King also decided to take a regular annual pilgrimage to the temple. The Oil (Aatiya Enna) extracted from the body of Lord Sree Krishna made up of Anjanasila after abhishekam is a divine and powerful medicine for acute Rheumatic complaint (Vatham).

=== Construction ===
However the main obstacle in reaching the island was lack of road connectivity. In those days only ferries were option to reach this island. As the temple is located somewhere in middle of the large island, it became difficult for kings and his retinue to walk a long distance once reaching the island. The reconstruction activities were also affected due irregular supplies of materials needed due to lack of road. In addition to this, the royal family thought for the necessity of a road for safe passage in event of a Dutch storming and attack over royal family. All these reason resulted in construction of a stone paved road from Valanjambalam to Chittoor temple. Works for the road started in 1617 and completed by 1622.

The original road was stone paved road and meant for exclusive travel for the King's carriage. An iron bridge was laid over Chittoor Lake that connects mainland with the island. The road ended at a turning before West gate of the temple. The road once again came into forefront during mid 18th century as part of strengthening Pallipuram Fort by Travancore Army. The construction of modern road in 1910 by Maharaja Rajrishi Rama Varma to connect residents of North Ernakulam with main parts of the city.

== Present ==
Until the 1940s, this road was the main road of the town before taken over by MG Road.

== See also ==
- Mahatma Gandhi Road (Kochi)
