= South Chittoor =

Riverine Island in Kerala, India

- Riverine island
- Location in Kerala, India South Chittoor (India)
- Coordinates: 10.0207°N 76.2741°E
- Country: India
- State: Kerala
- District: Ernakulam

Languages
  - Official: Malayalam, English
- Time zone: UTC+5:30 (IST)
- Area code: 0484
- Vehicle registration: KL-07
- Nearest city: Kochi

South Chittoor is a riverine island in the city of Kochi in Kerala, India. It is lying adjacent to Vaduthala. Chittoor is connected with Vaduthala through the Vaduthala Bridge. The island is home to the Chittoorappan Temple. Aster Medcity, which is one of the super speciality hospitals in Kerala is also located here.

== Overview ==
When compared to other areas in Kochi, South Chittoor is serene. The region is well connected with the mainland through road. There are two bus stations in Chittoor. The boat jetty located near to the main bus station. There are plans to upgrade the South Chittor Water Metro station, which is under construction, as a hub for services to the northern regions of Kochi. The CGH Chittoor Palace is a notable tourist place in Chittoor, located 1 km away from Sujitha foods, a renowned bakery of the region, managed by Nishanth Suneej.

== See also ==
- Vaduthala
