= Elamkunnapuzha =

- village
- Location in Kerala, India Elamkunnapuzha (India)
- Coordinates: 10°1′0″N 76°13′0″E
- Country: India
- State: Kerala
- District: Ernakulam

Population (2011)
  - Total: 26,997

Languages
  - Official: Malayalam, English
- Time zone: UTC+5:30 (IST)
- PIN: 682503
- Telephone code: 0484 249
- Vehicle registration: KL-42
- Nearest city: Ernakulam

Elamkunnapuzha is a village in the Ernakulam district in the Indian state of Kerala.

== Demographics ==
As of 2011 India census, Elamkunnapuzha had a population of 26,997, with 13,271 males and 13,726 females.

== Education ==
- Government Arts and Science College, Vypin
