= Njarackal =

Indian village

Njarackal Njarakkal, Narakal, Narackal
- Village
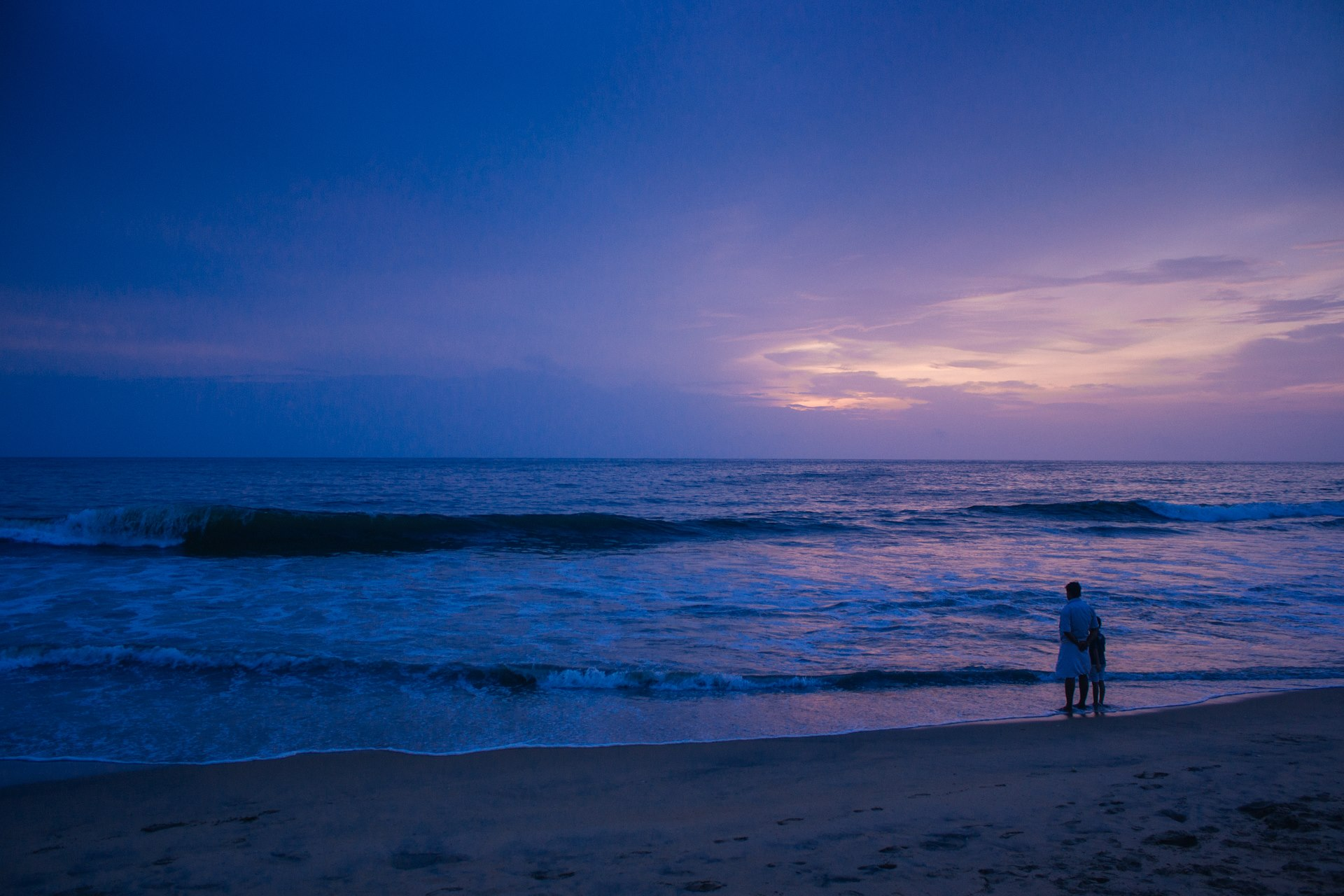
- Njarakkal Beach
- Interactive map of Njarackal
- Coordinates: 10.047°N 76.217°E
- Country: India
- State: Kerala
- District: Ernakulam

Area
  - Total: 6.99 km^{2} (2.70 sq mi)

Population (2024)
  - Total: 33,500 (estimated)
  - Density: 4,790/km^{2} (12,400/sq mi)

Languages
  - Official: Malayalam, English
- Time zone: UTC+5:30 (IST)
- PIN: 682505
- Telephone code: 0484
- Vehicle registration: KL 42
- Nearest city: Kochi
- Lok Sabha constituency: Ernakulam
- Vidhan Sabha constituency: Vypin
- Climate: MODERATE (Köppen)

Njarakkal (IPA: [ɲaːrɐkːɐl]) is a village in the Vypin area situated in Ernakulam district in the Indian state of Kerala.

== Demographics ==
Njarakkal is a village located at the center of Vypeen island, Ernakulam district in the southern state of Kerala, India. According to the 2011 Census of India, Njarakkal had a population of 23,760 people, with a male population of 11,544 and a female population of 12,216.

The literacy rate of Njarakkal is higher than the national average, with a literacy rate of 97.46% (as of 2011). The majority of the population speaks Malayalam, which is the official language of Kerala, and some people also speak English and Hindi.

Njarakkal has a mixed population of people from various religious backgrounds. The majority of the population is Hindu, followed by Christians and Muslims. The village is known for its rich cultural heritage and traditional festivals, which are celebrated with great enthusiasm by people of all religions.

The main occupation of the people in Njarakkal is fishing, and the village is famous for its fishing industry. However, with the growth of tourism, many people have also started working in the hospitality industry and other related businesses.

== Landmarks ==
- Fish Farm and Aqua Tourism Centre (MatsyaFed Njarakkal Fish Farm), Vypin
- Njarakkal Panchayath
- Village Office
- Police Station
- Kerala State Electricity Board office (KSEB)
- Krishi Bhavan
- Post Office
- Jai Hind Play Ground
- Government Register Office
- Sree Sakthidhara Temple
- Sree Balabhadra Temple
- Govt. Fisheries U.P. School
- Surya Wooden Industry
- Western Jewellery- Jewellers
- Bakers Corner- Dominant Bakers
- St. Mary's Church
- Majestic Multiplex
- Judicial First Class Magistrate Court
- Govt. Fashion Designing Institute
- Little Flower High School
- Marello Public School
- Talent Public School
- GVHSS Njarakkal
- Assisi Vidyanikethan Public School
- St. Joseph's Public School
