= Vallarpadam =

- Island
- Location in Kerala, India Vallarpadam (India) Vallarpadam (Kochi)
- Coordinates: 9.990°N 76.255°E
- Country: India
- State: Kerala
- District: Ernakulam

Government
  - Body: Muluvakad Panchayat

Languages
  - Official: Malayalam, English
- Time zone: UTC+5:30 (IST)
- Telephone code: 0484
- Vehicle registration: KL-7
- City: Kochi
- Lok Sabha constituency: Ernakulam
- Civic agency: Muluvakad Panchayat

Vallarpadam is one among the group of islands that form part of Kochi, in the state of Kerala, India. It is situated in Vembanad Lake, locally known as Kochi Lake and has a population of over 10,000. Vallarpadam is one of the two islands, the other being Willingdon Island, around which the Port of Kochi is situated. The International Container Transshipment Terminal of the port is situated entirely in Vallarpadam island. Vypin island lies to its west and Mulavukad island to its east.

== Road transport ==
Vallarpadam is connected by the Goshree bridges with the city center and Vypin island. Private Buses, state government owned buses and auto rickshaws ply between the island and Kochi city. The NH 47 C, which is a four lane one, connects Vallarpadam to the National Highway 47 at Kalamassery jn which is about 17.2 kilometres (10.7 miles) away. Vallarpadam is easily accessible from both NH 17 and NH 47.

== Rail transport ==
Since 2009, Vallarpadam is connected with Edapally Railway Station with a 4620m long rail bridge. The rail connectivity is entirely for transporting containers from the International Container Transshipment Terminal.

== Economy ==
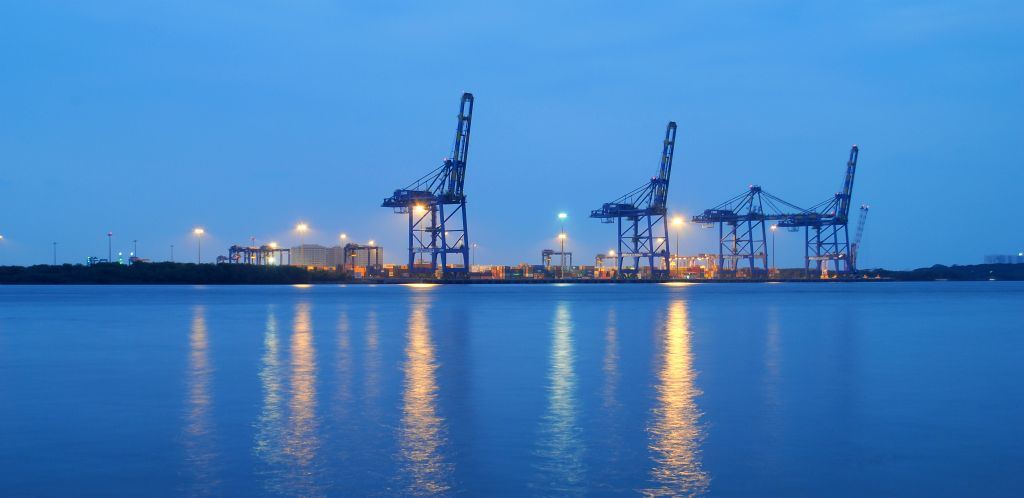
The International Container Transshipment Terminal

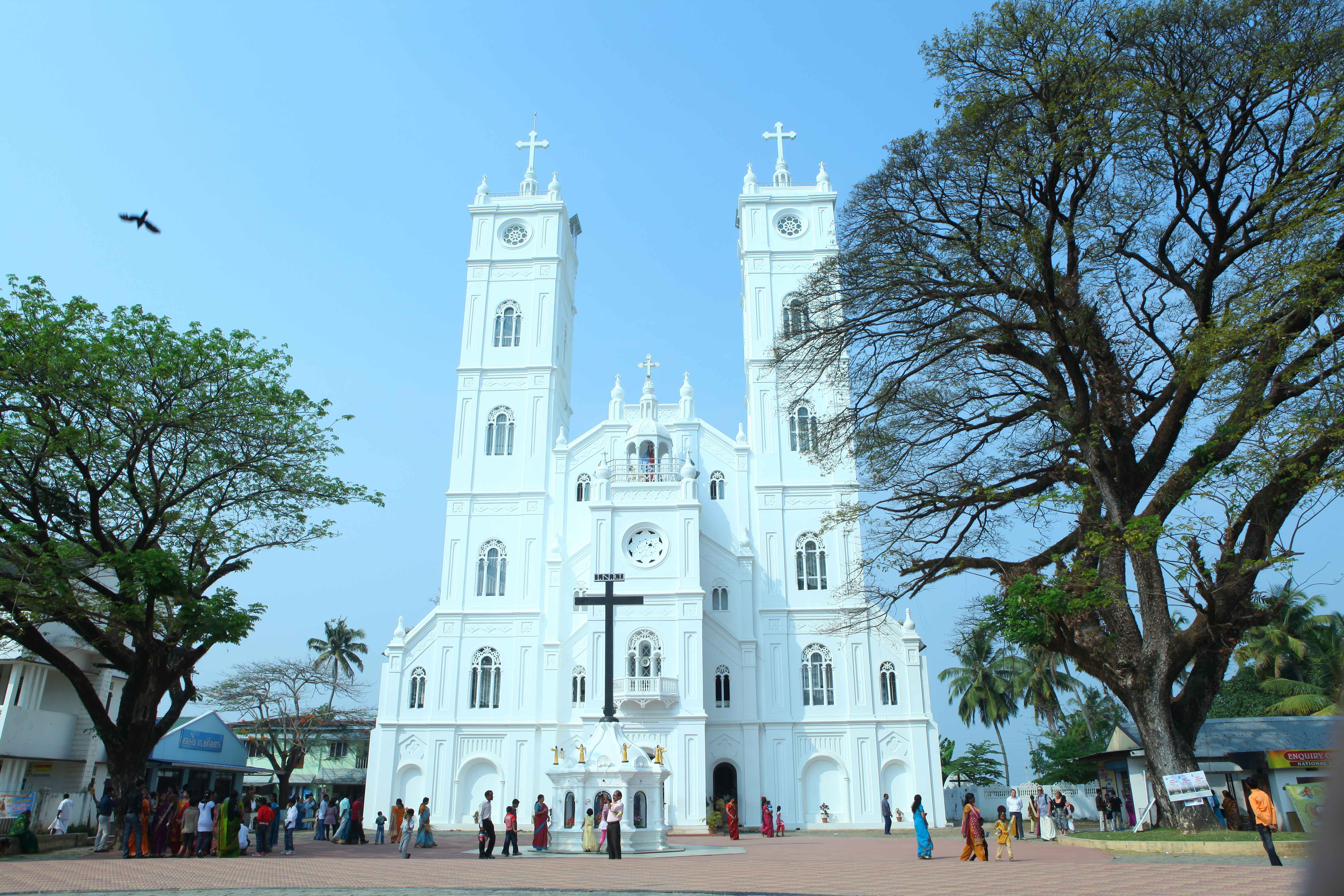
Vallarpadam Church

70% of the island consists of fishing fields. The economy principally consists of inland fishing using traditional methods. Fishing using specially prepared net, called a valakettu, is the major income for the fishing community.

== Places of interest ==
The Basilica of Our Lady of Ransom at Vallarpadam is a major Catholic pilgrim center in the State. Adikkandam Bhagavathy Temple, is a famous bhagavathy temple situated in the southern part of vallarpadam Island, called Panambukad.Also have sree kalari shastha (Ayyappan) temple east side of Vallarpadam.

== See also ==
- Ernakulam District
