= Mulavukad =

Mulavukad Bolgatty Island
- Census town
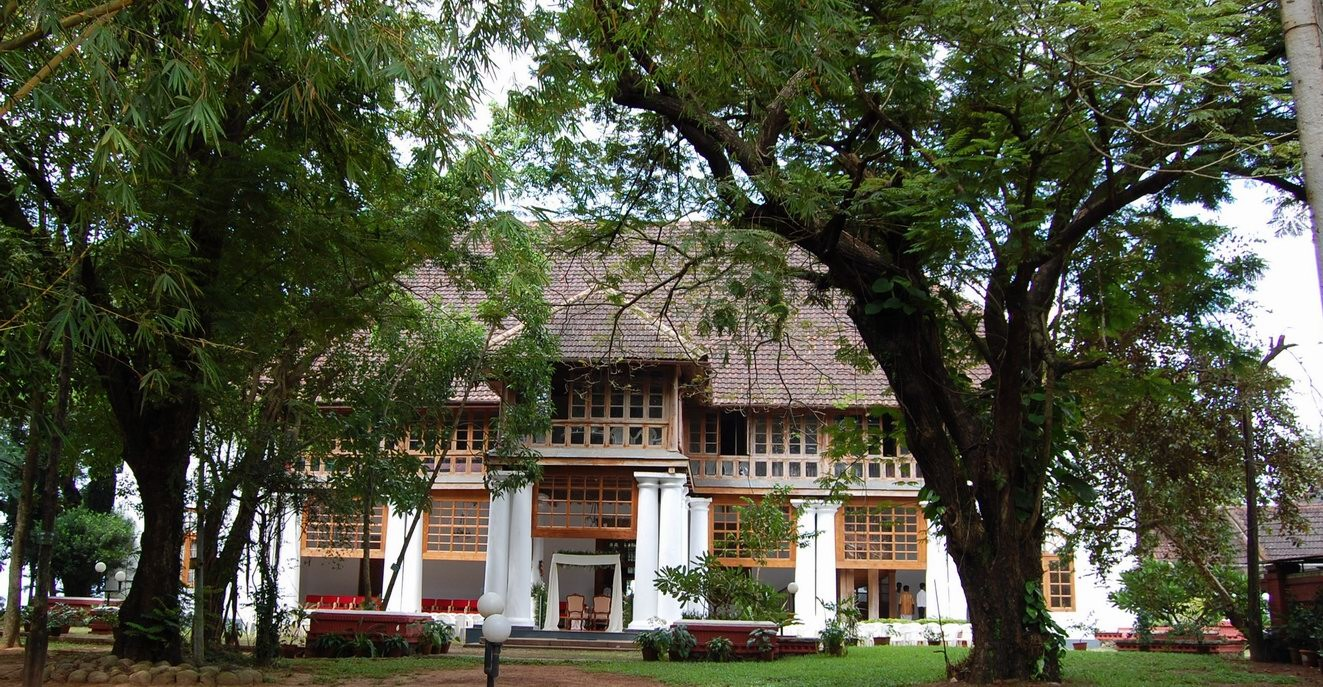
- The Bolgatty Palace

- Location in Kerala, India Mulavukad (India) Mulavukad (Kochi)
- Coordinates: 10.01°N 76.26°E
- Country: India
- State: Kerala
- District: Ernakulam

Population (2001)
  - Total: 22,845

Languages
  - Official: Malayalam, English
- Time zone: UTC+5:30 (IST)
- Postal code: 682504

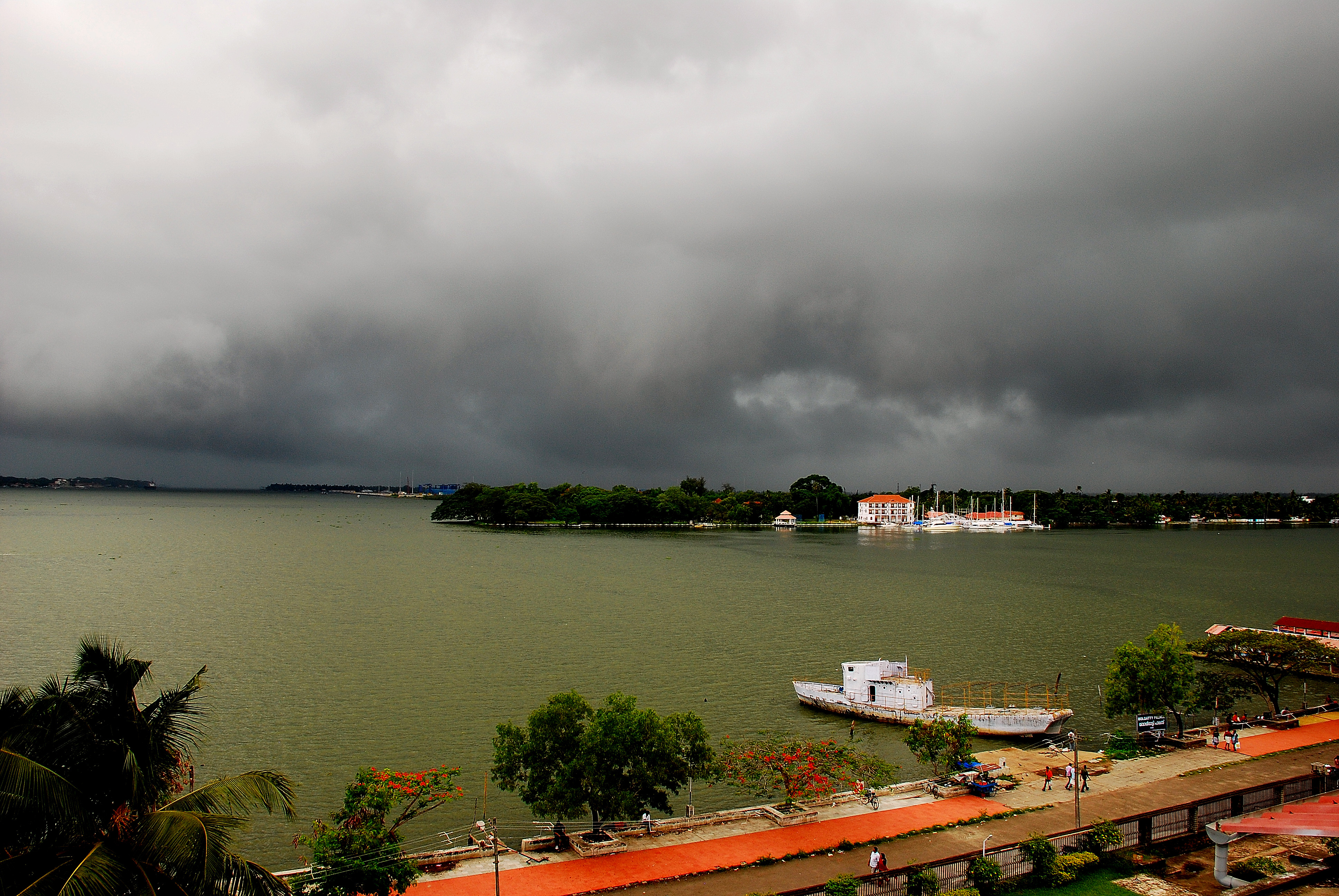
Bolgatty Palace

Mulavukad, also known locally as Bolgatty Island, is one of the islands that forms part of the city of Kochi in Kerala, India. It is in the Mulavukad Grama Panchayat. Vypin Island and Vallarpadam Island lie to its west, while Vaduthala lies to its east. Mulavukad is connected to mainland Ernakulam & Vallarpadam by the Goshree bridges and to the Container Terminal Road on its northern side, providing access to Kalamassery and Aluva.

The Bolgatty Palace built by Dutch traders in 1744 is located at the southern tip of the island.

== Demographics ==
At the 2001 India census, Mulavukad had a population of 22,845. Males constituted 49% of the population and females 51%. Mulavukad had an average literacy rate of 86%, higher than the national average of 59.5%: male literacy was 87% and female literacy was 84%. 11% of the population were under 6 years of age.
