= International Container Transshipment Terminal, Kochi =

Container port in India

International Container Transshipment Terminal
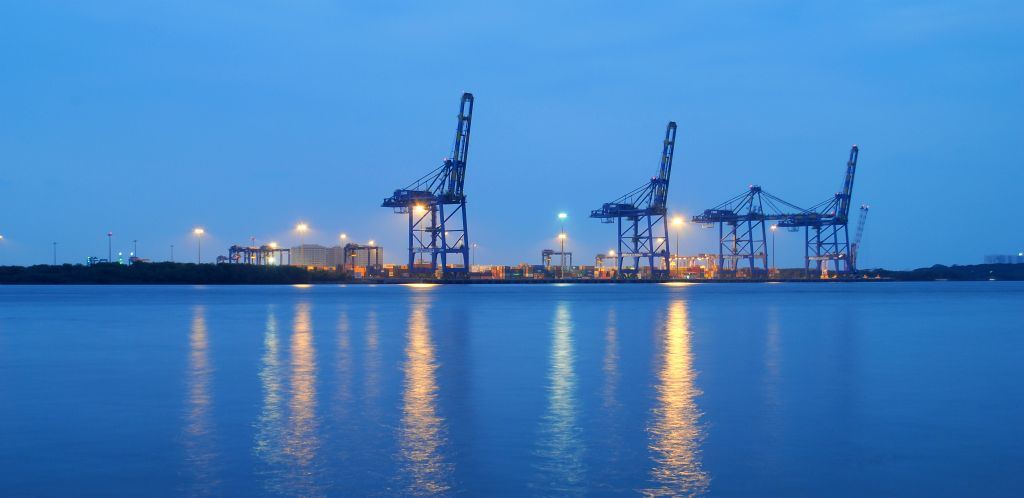
- Cranes at the Vallarpadam Terminal
- Other names(s): Vallarpadam Terminal, Kochi International Port

General information
- Location: (India) Vallarpadam, Kochi, Kerala
- Status: In operation
- Coordinates: 09°58′54″N 76°15′09″E
- Built by: DP World
- Opened: 11 February 2011

Technical details
- Cost: ₹ 3200 crore
- No of Super-Post Panamax/Megamax Crane: 7
- No of Rubber Tyred Gantry Crane: 21
- Maximum Draft: 16 m
- Quay Length: 950 m
- Terminal Area: 107 ha
- Depth Alongside: 17.6 m
- Container Yard: 10000 TEU ground slots
- Capacity: 2.5 Million TEUs
- Rail Tracks: 2
- Website: DP World Cochin

The Kochi International Container Transshipment Terminal (ICTT), locally known as the Vallarpadam Terminal, is a container terminal in Kochi, India. It is the first transshipment terminal in India and the first container terminal to operate in a SEZ. The terminal is operated by the DP World, which will operate it for 30 years after which the operations will come back to the Cochin Port Trust.

Being constructed in three stages, the first phase of the terminal was commissioned on 11 February 2011 with a capacity to handle cargo up to one million TEUs (twenty-foot equivalent units) per annum. In late 2023, DP World added new cranes, e-RTGs and expanded yard space, boosting the total capacity to 1.4 million TEUs per year. On completion of the third phase, the terminal will be able to handle 5.5 million Twenty-foot equivalent units (TEUs) of cargo per annum.

== History ==
Container Transshipment Terminal, Kochi first came to the mind of Dr. Babu Paul IAS, He proposed this project to K Karunakaran but the central government was not interested in this project. On 16 February 2005, Dubai Ports World announced that it has signed an agreement with the Cochin Port Trust (CoPT) to construct, develop and operate an International Container Transshipment Terminal (ICTT) – An India Gateway Terminal – at Vallarpadam.

The project was, formally, launched with the laying of the foundation stone by Manmohan Singh, the Prime Minister of India. Approval for the agreement was given by the Cabinet Committee of Economic Affairs of the Government of India, Ministry of Finance and meanwhile, the DP World will manage and subsequently transfer its operations at the Rajiv Gandhi Container Terminal in Cochin Port to the new terminal upon its completion. The DP World has been granted a 38-year concession for the exclusive operation and management of the site.

== Overview ==
Vallarpadam Terminal is the first in the country to operate in a special economic zone.

- The first phase was opened in 2011 with a 600 m Quay length and a draft of 14.5 m, with a capacity to handle 1 million TEUs. In October 2023, the terminal capacity was increased to 1.4 million TEUs after the arrival of six new cranes, including two STS megamax cranes.
- In the second phase the capacity will be enhanced to 3 million TEUs.
- In the third phase the terminal may handle even up to 5.5 million TEUs.

The total cost of the project is estimated at ₹ 3200 crore.

DP World has estimated that the total initial investment required will be approximately US$20 million which includes the immediate provision of four RTGs and two Mobile Harbour Cranes to the Terminal -to improve yard handling, truck turnaround time and quayside operations.

There is a railway connection between Vallarpadam terminal and Edappally Railway station on the strategic Shoranur-Ernamkulam railway line .

Strategically, located on the main east–west global shipping lines and offering draft of about 16 m, Cochin is destined to develop as the premier gateway to southern India, as also offering an alternative to Sri Lanka and Singapore for containers being transshipped for the Indian market.

== Location ==
The terminal is located in the Vallarpadam island in Kochi.

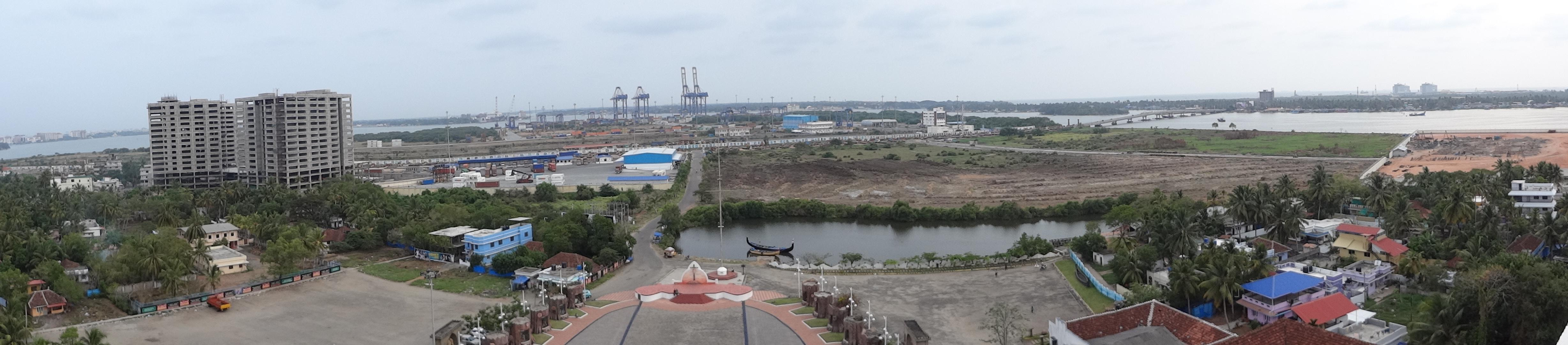
A panoramic view of Vallarpadam terminal from the top of Vallarpadam Church

== Opening ==
On 11 February 2011 the terminal was inaugurated by Manmohan Singh, the Prime Minister of India.

== See also ==
- Vembanad Bridge
- National Highway 47C (India)
- Inland port
- Kochi LNG Terminal
- Vizhinjam International Seaport Thiruvananthapuram
