= Kerala Maritime Board =

- KMB Logo
- Formation: 2017
- Type: Port authority
- Headquarters: Thiruvananthapuram, Kerala, India
- Region served: Kerala
- Minister for Ports: V.D. Satheesan
- Parent organization: Department of Fisheries and Ports, Government of Kerala
- Website: kmb.kerala.gov.in

The Kerala Maritime Board (KMB) based at Trivandrum is a governmental organisation in the state of Kerala, India. It was founded in 2017 to control, manage and operate the minor ports of Kerala. The state of Kerala has a 590km long coastline with 17 notified non major ports and Two major port Cochin Port and Vizhinjam International Seaport Thiruvananthapuram .

== History ==
The Kerala Maritime Board was founded in 2017 under the Kerala Maritime Board Act, 2017. It was created by merging the Directorate of Ports, Kerala State Maritime Development Corporation Limited, and the Kerala Maritime Society. It controls, manage and operates total 17 minor ports of Kerala.

== Ports ==
KMB operates 17 minor ports of Kerala and they are listed below. 3 of them have Immigration checkpoint facility.

No	Port	District	Port Type	Immigration Checkpoint	Remarks
1	Vizhinjam Port (Not to be confused with Vizhinjam International Seaport Thiruvananthapuram	Thiruvananthapuram	Minor	Yes	Seaport
2	Valiyathura Port	Thiruvananthapuram	Minor	No	Seaport
3	Kollam Port	Kollam	Intermediate	Yes	Seaport
4	Neendakara Port	Kollam	Intermediate	No	Seaport
5	Kayamkulam Port	Alappuzha	Minor	No	Seaport
6	Alappuzha Port	Alappuzha	Intermediate	No	Seaport
7	Kodungallur Port	Thrissur	Minor	No	Seaport
8	Ponnani Port	Malapuram	Minor	No	Seaport
9	Beypore Port	Kozhikode	Intermediate	No	Seaport
10	Kozhikode Port	Kozhikode	Intermediate	Yes	Seaport
11	Vadakara Port	Kozhikode	Intermediate	No	Seaport
12	Thalassery Port	Kannur	Minor	No	Seaport
13	Kannur Port	Kannur	Minor	No	Seaport
14	Azhikkal Port	Kannur	Intermediate	No	Riverine
15	Nileshwaram Port	Kasargod	Minor	No	Seaport
16	Kasaragod Port	Kasargod	Minor	No	Seaport
17	Manjeshwaram Port	Kasargod	Minor	No	Seaport

== See also ==
- Department of Ports, Government of Kerala
- Ports in Kerala
- Vizhinjam International Seaport
