= Trivandrum Shipyard Poovar =

Trivandrum Shipyard, a deep-water shipyard project in Trivandrum, Kerala, India

General information
- Location: Thiruvananthapuram, Kerala, India
- Status: Proposed by Government of Kerala
- Coordinates: 8.3219997°N 77.0591177°E

Services
- Shipyard Services: Ship design; Shipbuilding; Ship repair

Products
- Shipyard Products: Ultra Large Container Ships (ULCS); Ultra Large Crude Carriers (ULCC); Very Large Crude Carriers (VLCC); Mega Cruise Ships; Offshore platforms

The Trivandrum Shipyard Poovar (English: /ˈtrɪvəndrəm ... ˈpuːvɑːr/) is a proposed deep-water shipbuilding and repair facility for ultra-large vessels at Poovar in Trivandrum, Kerala. The site is located 10 nautical miles (19 km; 12 mi) away from the Suez to Singapore far east international shipping route, in very close proximity to key global maritime traffic. The site was identified as a potential location for a shipyard in 2008 when the central government evaluated coastal regions for shipbuilding infrastructure. Poovar met all the necessary conditions, including proximity to major transport hubs, and was ranked second in the assessment. The available depth in Poovar eliminates the need for dredging

In 2013, Cochin Shipyard Limited identified Poovar as a suitable location for shipbuilding and ship repair due to its strategic position and favorable conditions, conducting a feasibility study to assess its potential. In 2024, the central government initiated efforts to develop shipbuilding yards across the country including kerala. In response, the Kerala government proposed establishing a shipyard at Poovar in 2025.

The proposed shipyard is for large-scale shipbuilding and repair, with deep-water access that allows for the construction and maintenance of vessels, including Ultra Large Container Ships (ULCS), Ultra Large Crude Carriers (ULCC), Very Large Crude Carriers (VLCC), Mega Cruise Ships and offshore platforms. The project is strategically located near Vizhinjam International Seaport Thiruvananthapuram, 18 kilometers (11 mi) from Trivandrum International Airport, 5 km (3.1 mi) from NH-66, 12 km (7.5 mi) from the nearest railway station and 10 nautical miles (19 km; 12 mi) from an international shipping route. With its advantageous position, the facility could support India's growing maritime industry by reducing dependence on foreign shipyards and creating employment opportunities. The development is expected to be structured under a public-private partnership model, drawing both domestic and international investment to establish.

In the Kerala Budget 2025–26, Finance Minister K.N. Balagopal announced plans to establish a new shipyard in Poovar, along with the central government for its development.

== Depth requirements for shipyard ==
Poovar has a depth more than 20 meters (66 ft), which eliminates the need for extensive dredging and makes the site suitable for developing a shipyard capable of handling ultra-large vessels. The existing depth is sufficient to accommodate ULCVs, ULCCs, VLCCs, and mega cruise ships.

Depth requirements will increase as the size of vessels increases year by year.
| Vessel type | Light ship draft (m) | Fully loaded draft (m) | Dry dock depth (m) | Dry dock channel depth (m) |
|---|---|---|---|---|
| ULCV | 8–12 | 14–16 | 15–18 | 16–18 |
| ULCC | 10–15 | 20–25 | 15–22 | 25–30 |
| VLCC | 9–12 | 18–22 | 14–20 | 22–25 |
| Mega cruise ship | 8–10 | 9–11 | 14–18 | 10–12 |

ULCVs, with a light ship draft of 8–12 m (26–39 ft), require a dry dock depth of 15–18 m (49–59 ft) and a port channel depth of 16–18 m (52–59 ft), both of which are supported by the site's natural depth. ULCCs, with a light ship draft of 10–15 m (33–49 ft), require a dry dock depth of 15–22 m (49–72 ft) and a port channel depth of 25–30 m (82–98 ft), aligning with the location's natural advantages. The deep-water access also supports VLCCs and mega cruise ships, which require significant depths for dry docking and channel navigation. Additionally, the natural depth facilitates ballasting operations, essential for stabilizing vessels after launching. By leveraging these inherent features, such as natural depth exceeding 20 meters, is planned to be developed as a facility capable of accommodating the increasing dimensions and drafts of modern ultra-large vessels.

== Connectivity ==
=== Road connectivity ===
The Trivandrum Shipyard site is conveniently located with National Highway NH 66 is 5 km away, providing easy access to nearby regions. The upcoming Trivandrum Outer Ring Road is situated 10 km (6.2 mi) from the site, enhancing connectivity to other parts of the city and surrounding areas.

=== Rail connectivity ===
The Neyyattinkara Railway Station is approximately 11 km (6.8 mi) from the Trivandrum Shipyard, ensuring convenient rail access. Additionally, the upcoming Trivandrum Port tunnel railway is located 10 km away, further improving rail connectivity in the area.

=== Airport connectivity ===
The Trivandrum International Airport is situated about 23 km (14 mi) from the Trivandrum Shipyard, providing excellent connectivity for both passenger and cargo transportation.

=== Metro connectivity ===
The proposed Trivandrum metro is located 10 km from the Vizhinjam International Seaport Thiruvananthapuram Port lane and 10 km from the Neyyattinkara metro lane, with the possibility of extending the metro line to Trivandrum Shipyard, further improving urban transit options for the area.

=== Waterway connectivity ===
The waterway connectivity for the proposed Trivandrum Shipyard is provided by Vizhinjam International Seaport Thiruvananthapuram, located approximately 10 km from Poovar. Trivandrum Port, with its position along the Kerala coast, offers access to international shipping routes, enabling the transportation of materials, equipment, and vessels to and from global markets.
