= Ports in Kerala =

Transportation in the Indian state

Ports in Kerala

The South Indian state of Kerala has a coastline of around 590 km. The state is home to two major ports (Cochin Port) operated by Cochin Port Authority & DP World and owned by Ministry of Ports, Shipping and Waterways under Government of India and International Deepwater Transhipment Port at Vizhinjam, Thiruvananthapuram (Trivandrum Port), India's first and only deep water automatic transshipment port.In India the ports under central government is classified as Major Ports and other Ports are classified as non major Port

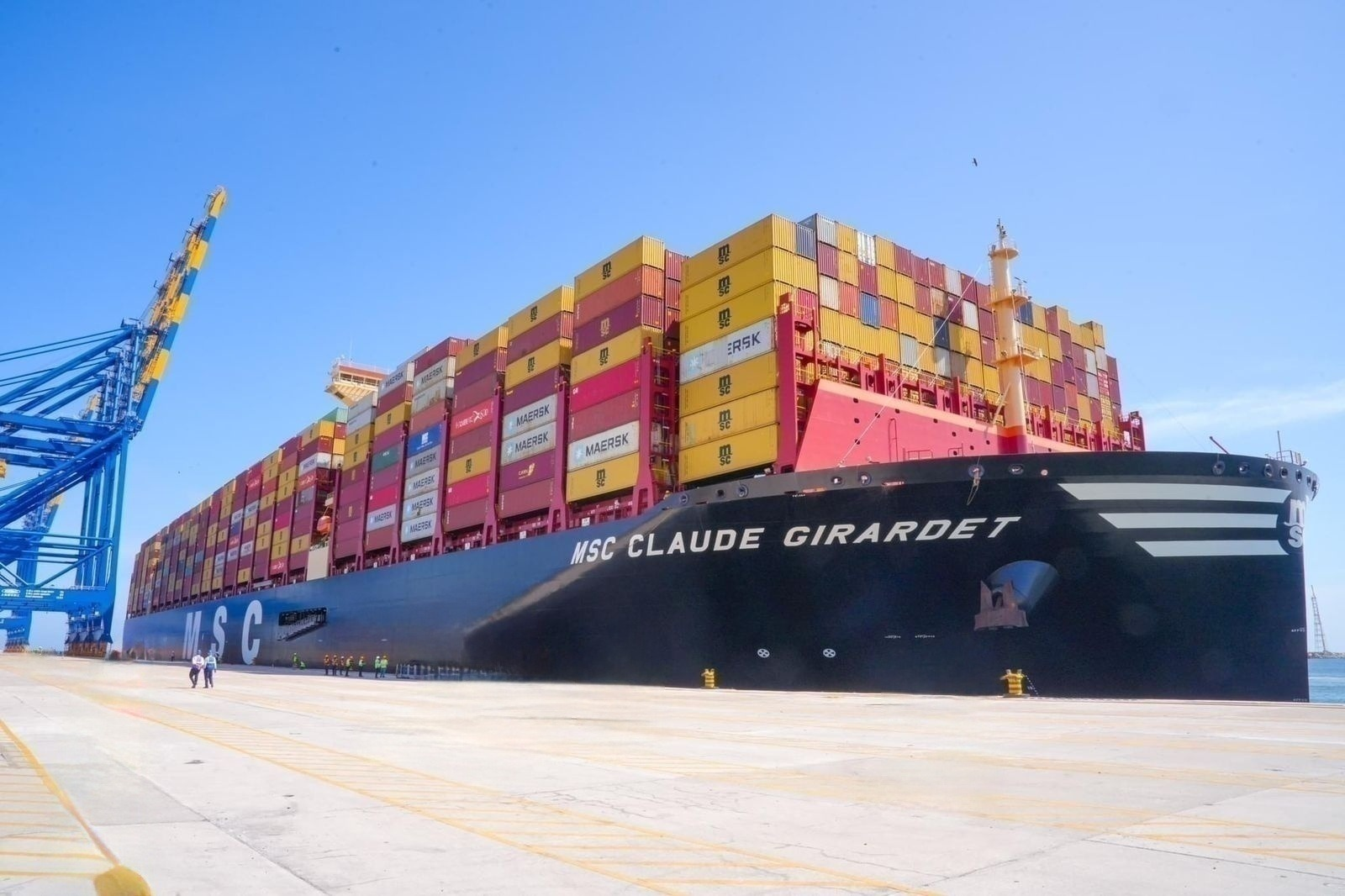
International Deepwater Transhipment Port, Vizhinjam, Trivandrum

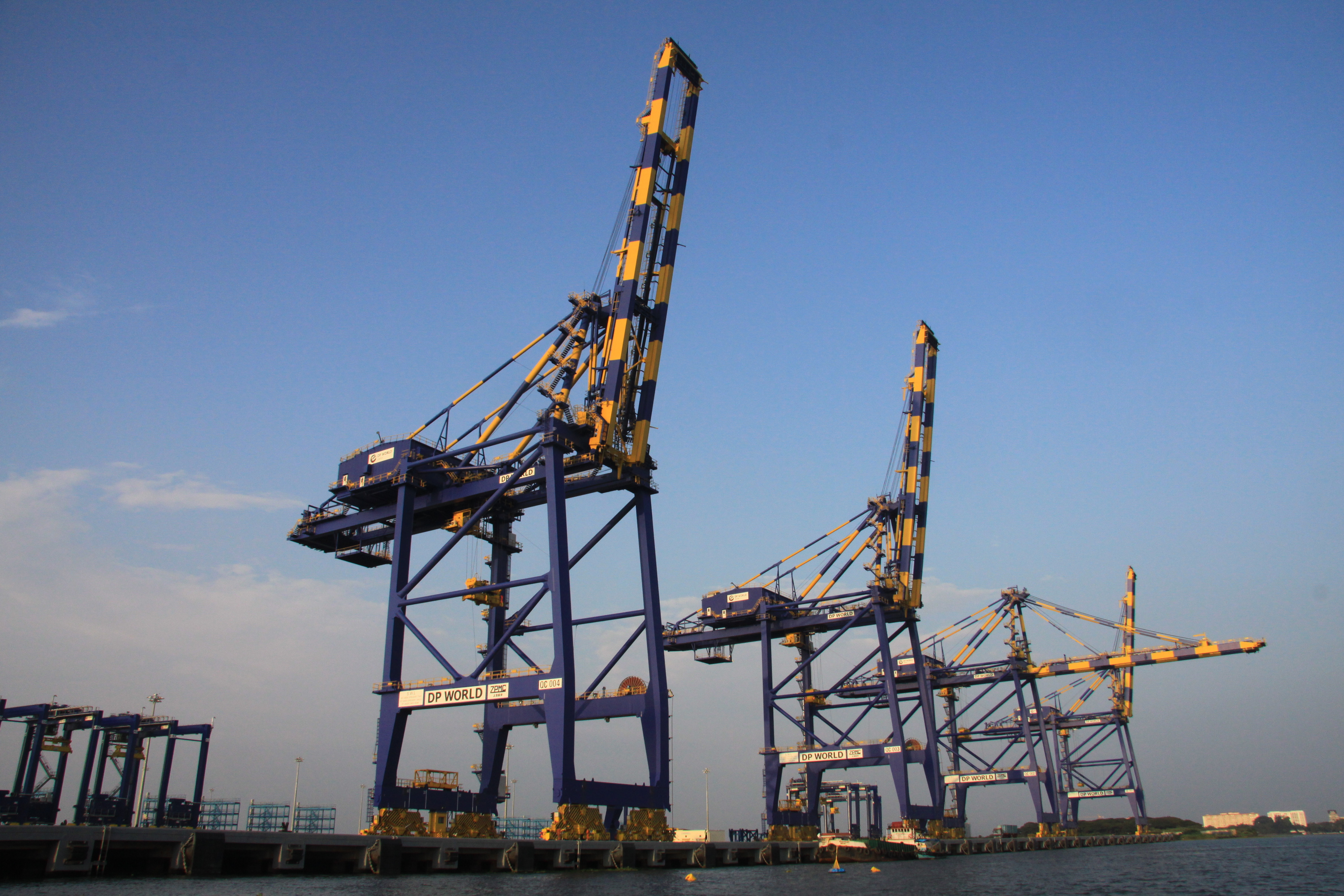
Kochi Port

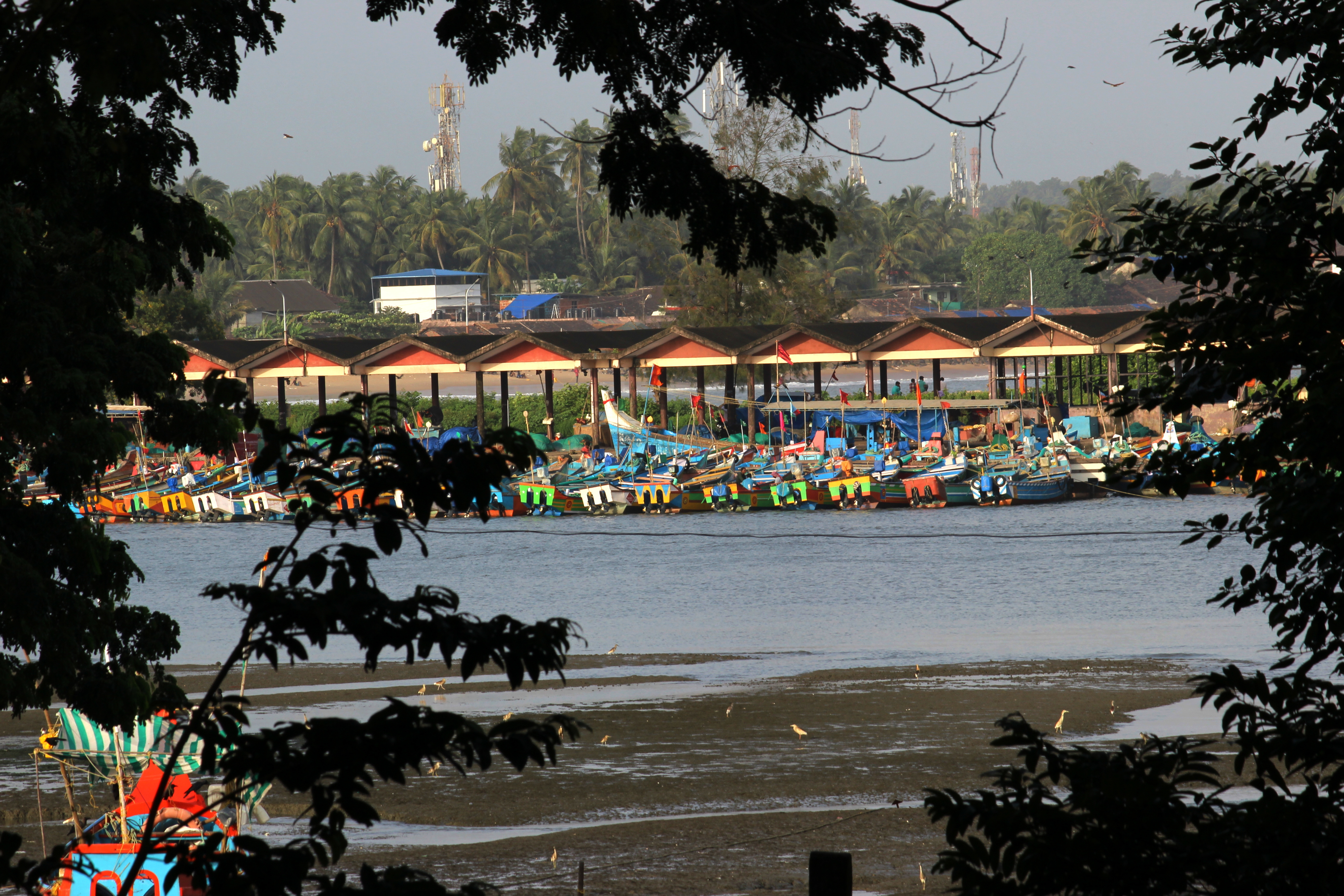
Port of Cannanore (Kannur)

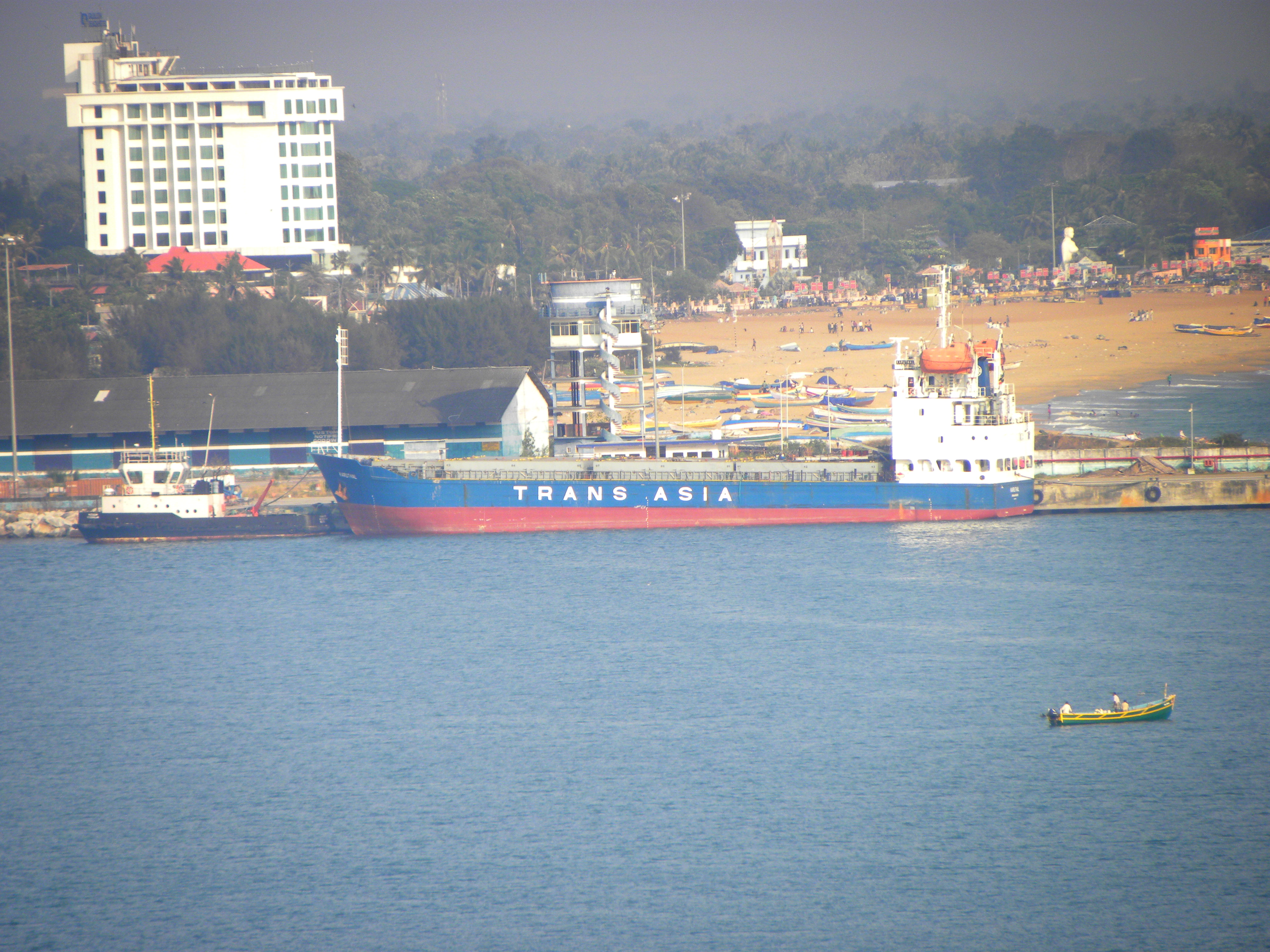
Kollam Port as seen from Tangasseri Lighthouse

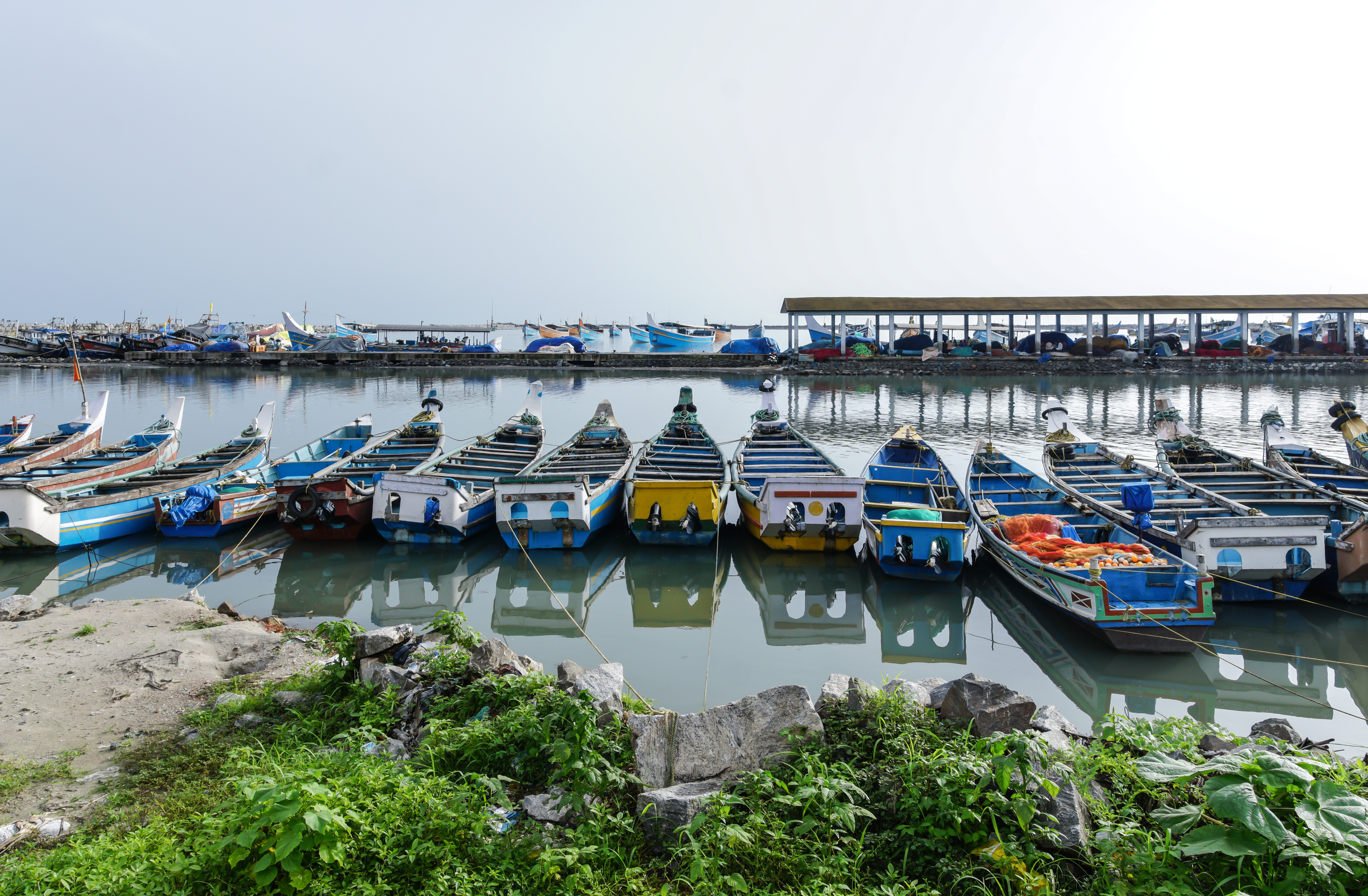
Quilandy harbour

Vizhinjam International Seaport Terminal, Thiruvananthapuram also known as Trivandrum Port and Kochi Port, also known as Cochin Port, are major ports in Kerala.

The International Seaport at Vizhinjam, Thiruvananthapuram is India's first deep-water container transshipment port.

Beypore Port handles most of the non-major port traffic in the state. It has both cargo and passenger services.

Neendakara Harbour is the biggest harbour in the Asian continent.

Ports owned by the central government are classified as major ports in India, while other ports are classified as minor ports.

== List ==
No	Port Location	District	Port Type	Draft	Deviation from International Suez to Singapore/Far East route	Port operation mode	Dredging	Immigration facility	Remarks
1	International Deepwater Transhipment Port, Vizhinjam Thiruvananthapuram(Trivandrum Port)	Thiruvananthapuram	Major	24	10 nautical miles (19 km)	Automatic/Semi automatic	No/Minimal	Yes	Seaport
2	Cochin Port	Ernakulam	Major	14.5	74 nautical miles (137 km)	Manual	Yes	Yes	Inland
3	Quilon (Kollam)	Kollam	Minor	13.2	30 nautical miles (56 km)	Manual	Yes	Yes	Seaport
4	Calicut	Kozhikode	Minor	8.6	100 nautical miles (190 km)	Manual	Yes	Yes	Seaport
5	Valiyathura	Thiruvananthapuram	Minor	8	13 nautical miles (24 km)	Manual	Yes	No	Seaport
6	Neendakara	Kollam	Minor	7	30 nautical miles (56 km)	Manual	Yes	No	Seaport
7	Kayamkulam	Alappuzha	Minor	6	40 nautical miles (74 km)	Manual	Yes	No	Seaport
8	Aleppey	Alappuzha	Minor	6	45 nautical miles (83 km)	Manual	Yes	No	Seaport
9	Manakkodam	Alappuzha	Minor	6	45 nautical miles (83 km)	Manual	Yes	No	Seaport
10	Kottayam	Kottayam	Minor	6.5	36 nautical miles (67 km)	Manual	Yes	No	Inland Port
11	Kodungallur	Thrissur	Minor	5.6	80 nautical miles (150 km)	Manual	Yes	No	Seaport
12	Ponnani	Malapuram	Minor	6	95 nautical miles (176 km)	Manual	Yes	No	Seaport
13	Beypore	Kozhikode	Minor	5	100 nautical miles (190 km)	Manual	Yes	No	Riverine
14	Koyilandy	Kozhikode	Minor	6	100 nautical miles (190 km)	Manual	Yes	No	Seaport
15	Thalassery	Kannur	Minor	5.6	90 nautical miles (170 km)	Manual	Yes	No	Seaport
16	Kannur	Kannur	Minor	5	90 nautical miles (170 km)	Manual	Yes	No	Seaport
17	Azhikkal	Kannur	Minor	5	90 nautical miles (170 km)	Manual	Yes	No	Seaport
18	Nileshwaram	Kasargod	Minor	6	90 nautical miles (170 km)	Manual	Yes	No	Seaport
19	Kasargod	Kasargod	Minor	5	92 nautical miles (170 km)	Manual	Yes	No	Seaport
20	Manjeswaram	Kasargod	Minor	6	90 nautical miles (170 km)	Manual	Yes	No	Seaport
