= Port Road =

Port Road may refer to:

- Port Road, Adelaide, South Australia
- Port Road, Kollam, South India
- Icknield Port Road railway station, Birmingham, England
- Port Road Branch, rail branch line serving Port Deposit, Maryland
- Port Road, a nickname of the Portpatrick and Wigtownshire Joint Railway in Scotland
