= Department of Fisheries and Ports (Kerala) =

Fisheries and port administration department of Kerala

Department overview
- Jurisdiction: Kerala, India
- Headquarters: Thiruvananthapuram, Kerala, India
- Annual budget: Fisheries: ₹695.1502 crore, Ports: ₹665.2440 crore Total: ₹1,360.3942 crore (US$140 million) (2026–27, revised)
- Ministers responsible: V. E. Abdul Gafoor, Minister for Fisheries; V.D. Satheesan, Minister for Ports
- Department executive: Dr. K. Vasuki IAS, Principal Secretary (Fisheries & Ports)
- Parent department: Government of Kerala
- Website: fisheries.kerala.gov.in

The Department of Fisheries and Ports is an administrative department under the Government of Kerala, responsible for fisheries development, harbour engineering, port infrastructure, and the welfare of fishermen in the state. The department formulates fisheries policies, ensures sustainable marine resource management, oversees coastal infrastructure development, and supervises fishing harbours and landing centres across Kerala.

It is one of the key economic and coastal administration departments and functions through directorates, missions, and public sector undertakings. The department implements welfare schemes for fishermen, promotes marine and inland aquaculture, and functions as a nodal authority for centrally sponsored fisheries programmes.

== Leadership ==
The Department of Fisheries and Ports is headed by Cabinet Ministers of the Government of Kerala, and the incumbent Minister for Fisheries is V. E. Abdul Gafoor and Minister for Ports is V. D. Satheesan, who is the Chief Minister of Kerala.

Administratively, the department is headed by a Principal Secretary to Government, an IAS officer. The Principal Secretary is supported by Additional Secretaries, Deputy Secretaries, and Section Officers in the Secretariat. The current Secretary to Government (Ports) is Dr. A. Kowsigan IAS and Secretary to Government (Fisheries) is B. Abdul Nasar IAS.

The operational wings of the department include:

- Directorate of Fisheries
- Harbour Engineering Department (HED)
- Coastal Shipping and Inland Navigation entities (selected ports and harbours)
- Kerala Maritime Board

== Sub-divisions ==
=== Directorate of Fisheries ===
The Directorate of Fisheries is the primary operational field agency of the department. It is headed by the Director of Fisheries, who serves as the Head of Department. The directorate administers schemes related to:

- Marine fisheries
- Inland fisheries and aquaculture
- Fishermen welfare
- Marine conservation and regulation

Fisheries Officers are posted in all coastal districts and major inland aquaculture zones.

=== Harbour Engineering Department (HED) ===
The Harbour Engineering Department acts as the technical arm responsible for infrastructure development of fishing harbours, landing centres, and port engineering works. It designs, constructs, and maintains coastal structures such as:

- Fishing harbours
- Fish landing centres
- Inland waterway terminals
- Breakwaters and waterfront facilities

== Functions ==
Ports

Kerala has a coastline stretching around 590 km and has 17 notified non-major ports along with the major port at Cochin Port. The non-major ports in the state are administered by the Government of Kerala. With the enactment of the Kerala Maritime Board Act, 2017, the responsibility for the administration and management of these ports was vested with the Kerala Maritime Board.

- Administration related to Ports and allied matters.
- Kerala Maritime Board
- Kerala Maritime Institute
- Administration of Port Department including Hydrographic Survey Wing
- Development of minor and intermediate ports including dredging
- Administration of Harbour Engineering Department and institutions thereunder
- Administration of Indian Ports Act
- Cochin Port Trust
- Implementation of the Kerala Inland Vessels Rules, 2010 and related affairs

Fisheries

- Administrative matters related to fisheries
- Directorate of Fisheries
- Formulation of policies related to marine and inland fisheries.
- Conservation and management of fish resources and regulation of fishing activities.
- Administration and regulation of minor ports and fishing harbours across the state.
- Implementation of welfare schemes for fishermen including housing, insurance and social protection.
- Promotion of aquaculture, fish farming, and value-added fish processing.
- Infrastructure development through the Harbour Engineering Department.
- Management of coastal safety measures including modernization of harbours.

== Subordinate Institutions ==
=== Directorates / Field Departments ===
- Directorate of Fisheries
- Harbour Engineering Department

=== autonomous bodies & PSUs ===
- Kerala State Coastal Area Development Corporation Ltd. (KSCADC)
- Kerala State Co-operative Federation for Fisheries Development Ltd. (Matsyafed)
- Agency for Development of Aquaculture Kerala (ADAK)

=== Major Institutions and Bodies under the Department ===
- Fishing Harbours (State-owned)
- Fish Landing Centres
- Inland aquaculture farms and hatcheries
- Marine enforcement and monitoring units

== Fisheries and Port Infrastructure ==
Kerala has one of the largest coastal fisheries networks in India. The department oversees fishing harbours and landing centres along the state's 590 km coastline.

Sl. No.	Category	Total units
1	Fishing Harbours	20
2	Fish Landing Centres	128
3	Minor Ports under State Government	17
4	Harbour Engineering Field Offices	15
5	Aquaculture Farms / Hatcheries	35

== List of Ministers ==
Fisheries

- K.V. Thomas (2001-2004)
- Dominic Presentation (2004-2006)
- S. Sharma (2006-2011)
- K. Babu (2011-2016)
- Oommen Chandy (23 January 2016 to 20 May 2016)
- J. Mercykutty Amma (2016-2021)
- Saji Cherian (2021-2026)
- V. E. Abdul Gafoor (2026-Continues)

Ports

- V. Surendran Pillai (2010-2011)
- K. Babu (2011-2016)
- Oommen Chandy (23 January 2016 to 20 May 2016)
- Kadannappalli Ramachandran (2016-2021)
- V. N. Vasavan (2021-2026)
- V. D. Satheesan (2026-Continues)
