= Vizhinjam Port =

Vizhinjam Port (Location Code: IN VZJ) is a minor port located within the Vizhinjam harbour near Thiruvananthapuram, Kerala, India. Administered by the Kerala Maritime Board, it functions as a fishing harbour and facilitates coastal shipping operations. This port is distinct from the International Deepwater Transhipment Port operated by Vizhinjam International Seaport Ltd. Thiruvananthapuram (Location Code: IN TRV).

== Berth details ==
=== Seaward wharf ===
Length of 83 metres with a draft of 4.0 metres.
The seaward wharf complies with International Ship and Port Facility Security (ISPS) Level 1 standards.

=== Leeward wharf ===
Length of 81 metres with a draft of 5.0 metres.
It is used for coastal shipping and fishing vessel operations. The wharf provides berthing facilities for small cargo vessels.

=== Coast Guard berth ===
A dedicated berth for the Indian Coast Guard is under construction at Vizhinjam harbour. This berth is designed to be 76.7 metres long and 8 metres wide, with an estimated cost of ₹25 crore. The construction is nearing completion and is expected to be commissioned by the end of March 2025. Once operational, it will accommodate two medium-sized vessels of approximately 30 metres in length.

== Vizhinjam port and International Deepwater Transhipment Port Thiruvananthapuram ==
Vizhinjam port and International Deepwater Transhipment Port Thiruvananthapuram are two separate port facilities located in Thiruvananthapuram, Kerala. Vizhinjam Port (UN/LOCODE: IN VZJ) falls under the jurisdiction of the Kerala Maritime Board and primarily supports fishing and coastal shipping operations. It is situated within the Vizhinjam harbour and includes two berths: the sea ward and leeward wharves.

International Deepwater Transhipment Port (UN/LOCODE: IN TRV) is managed by Vizhinjam International Seaport Limited (VISL) Thiruvananthapuram and is developed to accommodate large container vessels and facilitate global trade. This naming convention aligns with the United Nations Code for Trade and Transport Locations (UN/LOCODE), where "TRV" represents Trivandrum and "1" signifies the port.Based on the port's official location code, it is also known as Trivandrum Port.

Although these ports are geographically close, they serve distinct purposes and are managed by different authorities under the Government of Kerala.
