= Vizhinjam International Seaport Thiruvananthapuram =

Port in Kerala, India

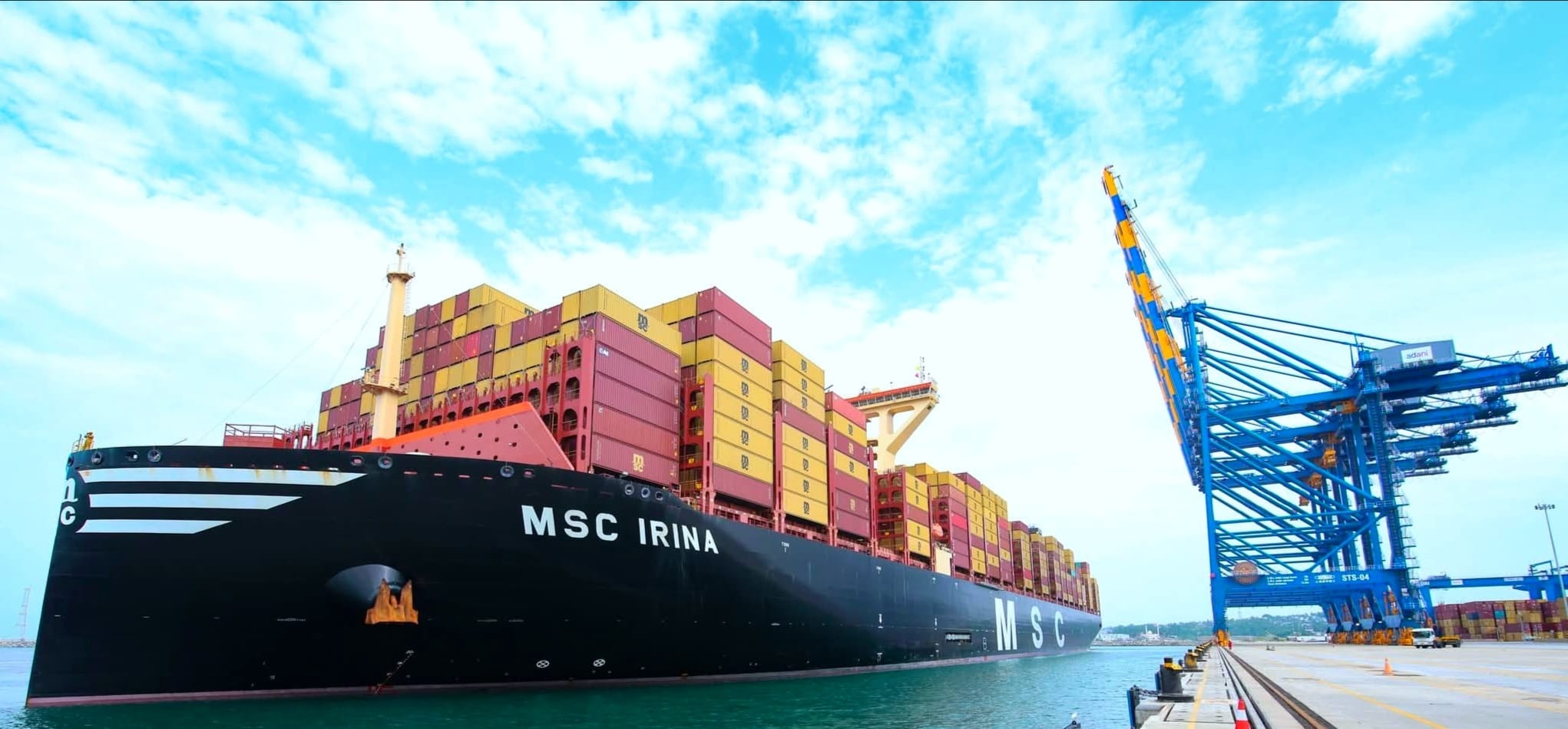
- MSC Irina at Vizhinjam International Seaport Thiruvananthapuram
- Interactive map of Vizhinjam International Seaport Thiruvananthapuram
- Location within Kerala Location within India
- Native name: Viḻiññam Antārāṣṭra Turamukham, Tiruvaṇāntapuraṃ (Malayalam)

Location
- Country: India
- Location: Vizhinjam, Thiruvananthapuram, India
- Coordinates: 8°22′21″N 76°59′55″E
- UN/LOCODE: IN TRV

Details
- Opened: 2 May 2025
- Operated by: Vizhinjam International Seaport Ltd (VISL); Adani Vizhinjam Port Pvt Ltd (AVPL)
- Owned by: Government of Kerala
- Type of Harbor: All-weather; Multipurpose, Green, Deep-Draft, Deep-Water Mega Seaport
- Size: 450.59 hectares (4.5059 km^{2})
- No. of berths: 2 (2024)
- Employees: 2,000 (2024)
- Depth: 24 m (79 ft)^{+}
- Nautical Charts: 2111/4; Vizhinjam Ports; West Coast

Statistics
- Annual revenue: ₹2,15,000 crore (2024–25)
- Net income: ₹2,500 crore (2024–25)
- Website www.vizhinjamport.in

Vizhinjam International Seaport Thiruvananthapuram (/vɪzɪnˈdʒæm ... ˌtɪrʊvənənˈtɑːpʊrəm/, VIZ-in-jam ... TIR-uu-və-nə-TAH-puurr-əm) also known as Trivandrum Port (IN TRV 01) is India's first deep-water transshipment port. Located at Vizhinjam within the city of Thiruvananthapuram, the port is designed to be a multi-purpose, all-weather, green port and is about 19 kilometres (12 mi) from Thiruvananthapuram International Airport. It is India's first automated port, and its only port directly adjacent to an international shipping lane. The port is 10 nautical miles (19 km; 12 mi) from the heavily trafficked east–west shipping channel connecting Europe to the Persian Gulf, Southeast Asia, and the Far East (Suez–Far East route and Far East–Middle East route). The port has a natural depth of 24 metres (reducing the need for dredging) and can host many of the world's massive cargo ships, including those exceeding 24,000 TEU such as ULCS container ships. The port was inaugurated by Indian Prime Minister Narendra Modi on 2 May 2025.

The port's breakwater is India's deepest, reaching a depth of 28 metres – roughly equal to the height of a nine-storey building. The largest vessel to dock at the port is the MSC Türkiye (399.99 metres long and 61.3 metres wide, with a capacity of 24,346 TEU); the highest TEU movement on a single vessel was 10,576 TEU on the MSC Paloma. A cruise berth is under construction along the breakwater for cruise ships. When fully commissioned, the port is expected to be capable of accommodating 50 percent of India's container transshipment currently handled at Dubai, Colombo and Singapore. The project's first phase cost ₹8,867 crore (equivalent to ₹94 billion, US$980 million or €860 million in 2026); and the remaining phases cost ₹20,000 crore (equivalent to ₹210 billion, US$2.2 billion or €2.0 billion in 2026).

The port's location, near the southern tip of the Indian coast, provides access to other Indian ports on the eastern and western coasts. Its breakwater extends 7.5 metres above the waterline and 22 metres below. The breakwater is 3.1 kilometres long, and will be extended to 4.5 kilometres in the port's final phase. The STS Super Post-Panamax crane, with an outreach of 72 metres, a back reach of 20 metres, a rail gauge of 35 metres and a lifting height of 74 metres, is India's tallest STS crane. A rail connection planned for Vizhinjam Seaport will include the construction of India's third-longest rail tunnel. The port, owned by the government of Kerala, will be operated by the Adani Group for 40 years.

Vizhinjam International Seaport is expected to compete with international ports such as Colombo in Sri Lanka, Salalah in Oman, Port of Jebel Ali in Dubai and Singapore Port. Its construction has three phases, with which the first phase was completed by September 2024. It is proposed to follow the landlord-port model, accommodating passenger, container and other cargo shipping.

== Vizhinjam Port and Vizhinjam International Seaport Thiruvananthapuram ==
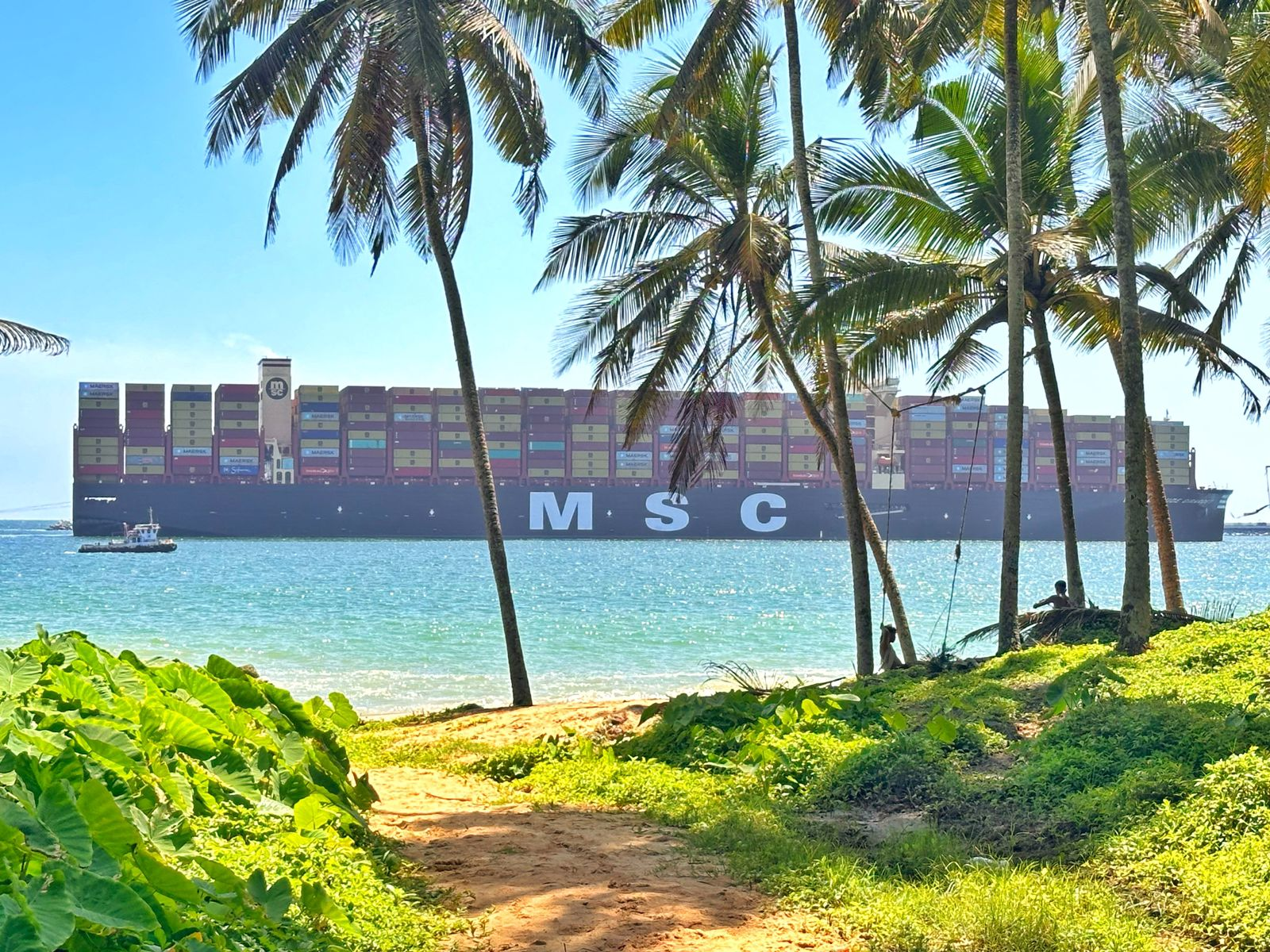
The ULCV MSC Claude Girardet is the largest vessel to dock in South Asia.

Vizhinjam Port and Vizhinjam International Seaport Thiruvananthapuram are both in Thiruvananthapuram. Vizhinjam Port (UN/LOCODE: IN VZJ), managed by the Kerala Maritime Board, primarily supports maritime activities. Vizhinjam International Seaport is in the Vizhinjam harbour. The port has two berths: seaward and leeward. Vizhinjam International Seaport Thiruvananthapuram (UN/LOCODE: IN TRV), managed by Vizhinjam International Seaport is designed for large container ships and international trade. To avoid confusion, it is often called Thiruvananthapuram Port.

== History ==
=== Early history ===
Maritime trade in the region dates back to the second century BCE. When the Ay dynasty was defeated by the Pandyas in the eighth century CE, they migrated to Vizhinjam in Thiruvananthapuram. Several kings, including Chadayan Karunanthan (788), Karunanthadakkkan "Srivallabha" and Vikramaditya Varaguna (who ruled c. 884–911/920), were Ay chiefs of Vizhinjam. A 2006 excavation unearthed remnants of a fort in Vizhinjam which probably belonged to the Ay chieftains and was believed to date back to the eight or ninth century. According to Sangam literature, the fort was destroyed in the 12th century during the invasion of Kolothunga Chola. Vizhinjam was developed into a port by Raja Kesava Das, dewan of Travancore, during the reign of Rama Varma I.

=== 1940s ===
The idea for a modern port at Vizhinjam was considered by C. P. Ramaswami Iyer when he was diwan of Travancore. Although a survey was conducted during the 1940s, the foundations of the port were conceived about fifty years later. Eliyas John and the Vizhinjam Mother Port Action Committee aimed to educate the public and government authorities about the need for the port. On royal orders, a British engineer arrived in Travancore to study the Vizhinjam area. The Vizhinjam Harbour Special Section was established in 1946 by the Airport Division of the Public Works Department. The survey data was forwarded to Britain and the Travancore government. By the time Travancore and Kochi merged, India was independent. In Thiru-Kochi, the need for a port challenging Kochi's gained traction and the Vizhinjam Port office was closed.

=== 1991 to 2015 ===
In 1991, ports minister M. V. Raghavan laid the groundwork for the project. Initial preparations for a port at Vizhinjam were begun in 1991 by the K. Karunakaran government in Kerala. The E. K. Nayanar government also advanced the project. The A.K. Antony government, which came to power in Kerala, entered into tender proceedings. An MoU was signed by the state government and Kumar Engineering Corporation to develop the port.

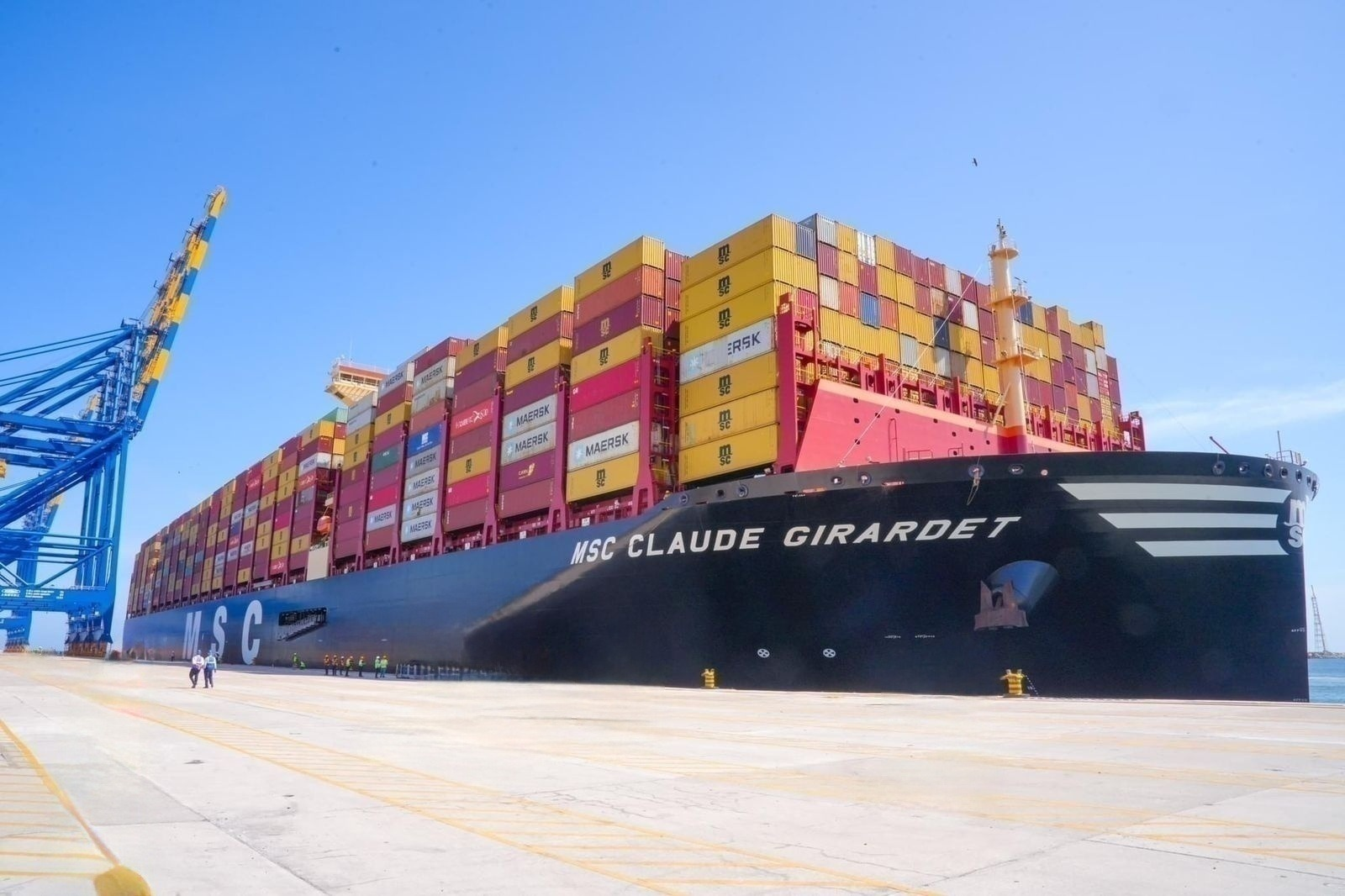
The MSC Claude Girardet at Trivandrum port

In 2006, the V.S. Achuthanandan government addressed issues related to the port and resubmitted its request for clearance to the central government the central government rejected the application again for security reasons. An all-party meeting was then held, and new tender proceedings were begun; an international meeting was organised to attract investors for the port's construction.

A public–private partnership (PPP) model was suggested, and the Andhra Pradesh company Lanco Group submitted a bid which was accepted. Lanco's bid was challenged in the Kerala High Court by Zoom Developers, and Lanco withdrew it. The International Finance Corporation (IFC) was appointed the port's lead advisor in November 2009. In 2009 and 2010, the IFC produced a series of studies and reports recommending a landlord model (where the state would invest over US$1 billion in constructing the port) instead of the PPP model. Larsen & Toubro Infrastructure Engineering began the port's environmental impact assessment.

After the landlord model was accepted by the state government, bidding concluded; a consortium, led by Welspun Group, was the only entity eligible to operate the port. Welspun requested a grant of approximately ₹480 crore (equivalent to ₹987 crore or US$100 million in 2026) in net present value over a 16-year period. In negotiations between the Kerala government and the Welspun Group, Welspun agreed to reduce its grant request to 400 crore; the state government rejected its offer.

A Ministry of Environment committee recommended approval of the project on 3 December 2013, and tenders for construction of a breakwater, fish-landing centre, and port operator began the following day. The Adani Ports and SEZ was the project's sole bidder, and was awarded the contract by the Oommen Chandy government in 2015. Steps toward land acquisition were also taken by the Chandy government.

=== After 2015 ===
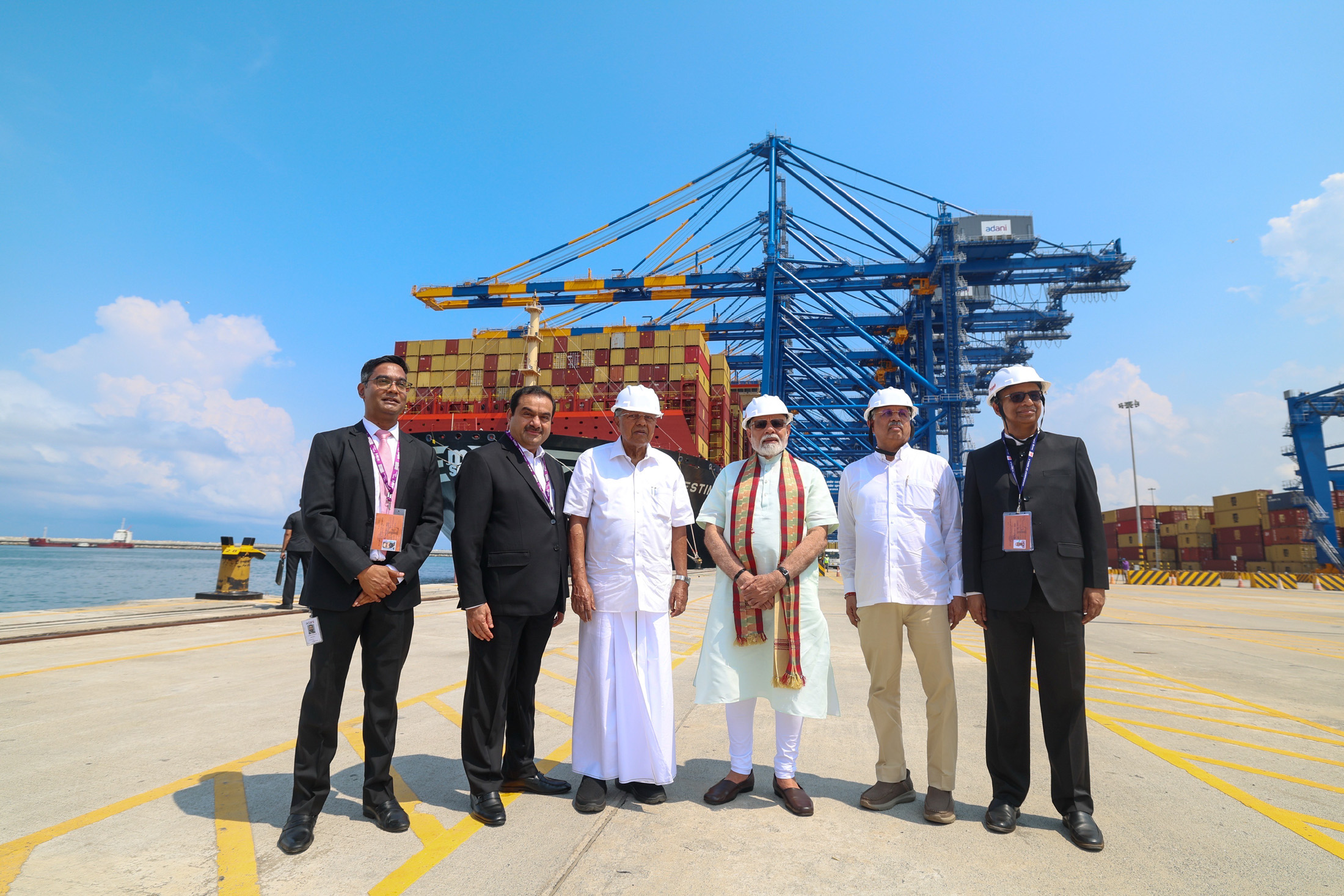
Prime Minister Narendra Modi dedicated Vizhinjam International Seaport to the nation on 2 May 2025.

When construction began on 5 December 2015, Adani Group CEO Gautam Adani said that the first ship would dock at the port on 1 September 2018. In 2017, Cyclone Okchi damaged part of the breakwater. A shortage of limestone, the project's most critical raw material, caused another delay. The port also faced resistance from surrounding fishing communities and church groups, who said that the construction and debris hampered their ability to fish. It was also affected by the COVID-19 pandemic. Adani Group invoked force majeure to explain why the project was not completed in time.

When the port's first phase neared completion, the first general cargo ship from China arrived at the Vizhinjam port on 12 October 2023. The ship, Zhen-Hua 15, left China in August and had arrived at Mundra Port in Gujarat few weeks earlier. It carried one quay crane and two yard cranes which would be installed at the port.

The San Fernando, its first container ship, docked on 11 July 2024. Vizhinjam International Seaport welcomed the MSC Türkiye, the world's largest eco-friendly container ship, in April 2025.

== Infrastructure ==
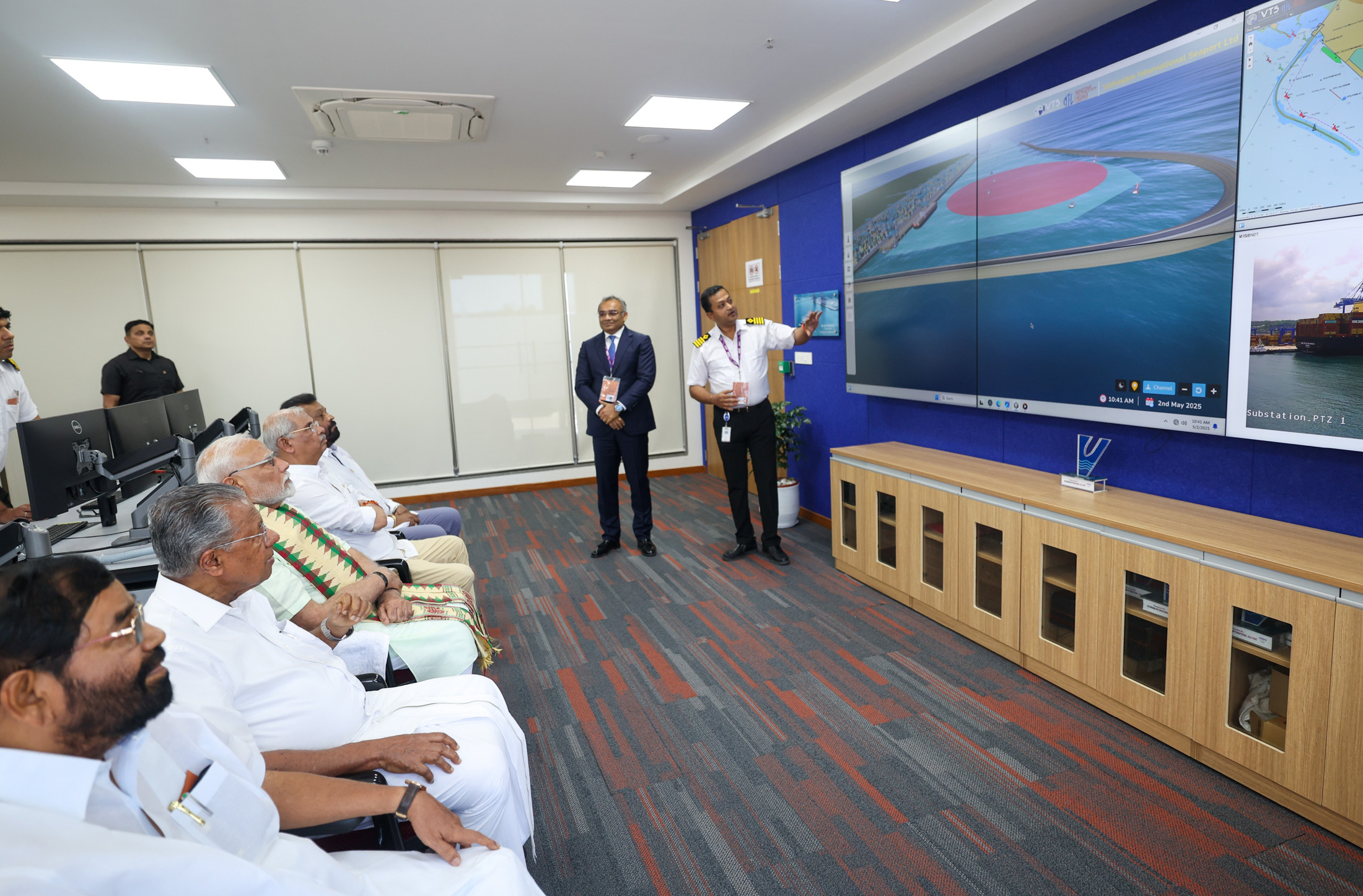
Modi and other dignitaries being briefed about Vizhinjam International Seaport's infrastructure

The port, about 14 km (8.7 mi) from Kerala's capital city Thiruvananthapuram, is about 10 nautical miles (19 kilometres) from the international east–west shipping route connecting Western Asia, Europe, Africa and the Far East. India's first deepwater transshipment terminal, it is being developed in three phases. The port has negligible littoral sedimentation. With a natural depth of 24 m (79 ft), construction requires minimal dredging. Its proximity to international shipping routes and its modern port facilities shorten vessel turnaround time (VTT).

When phase one was completed, Vizhinjam port was expected to accommodate 1 million TEU (20-foot-equivalent container units). Succeeding phases were expected to add another 6.2 million TEU, accounting for more than 70 percent of India's transshipment by 2023. The port will be connected by India's third-longest railway tunnel, due for completion in 2028. The STS Super Post-Panamax crane has an outreach of 72 metres, a back reach of 20 metres, a rail gauge of 35 metres, and a total lifting height of 74 metres.

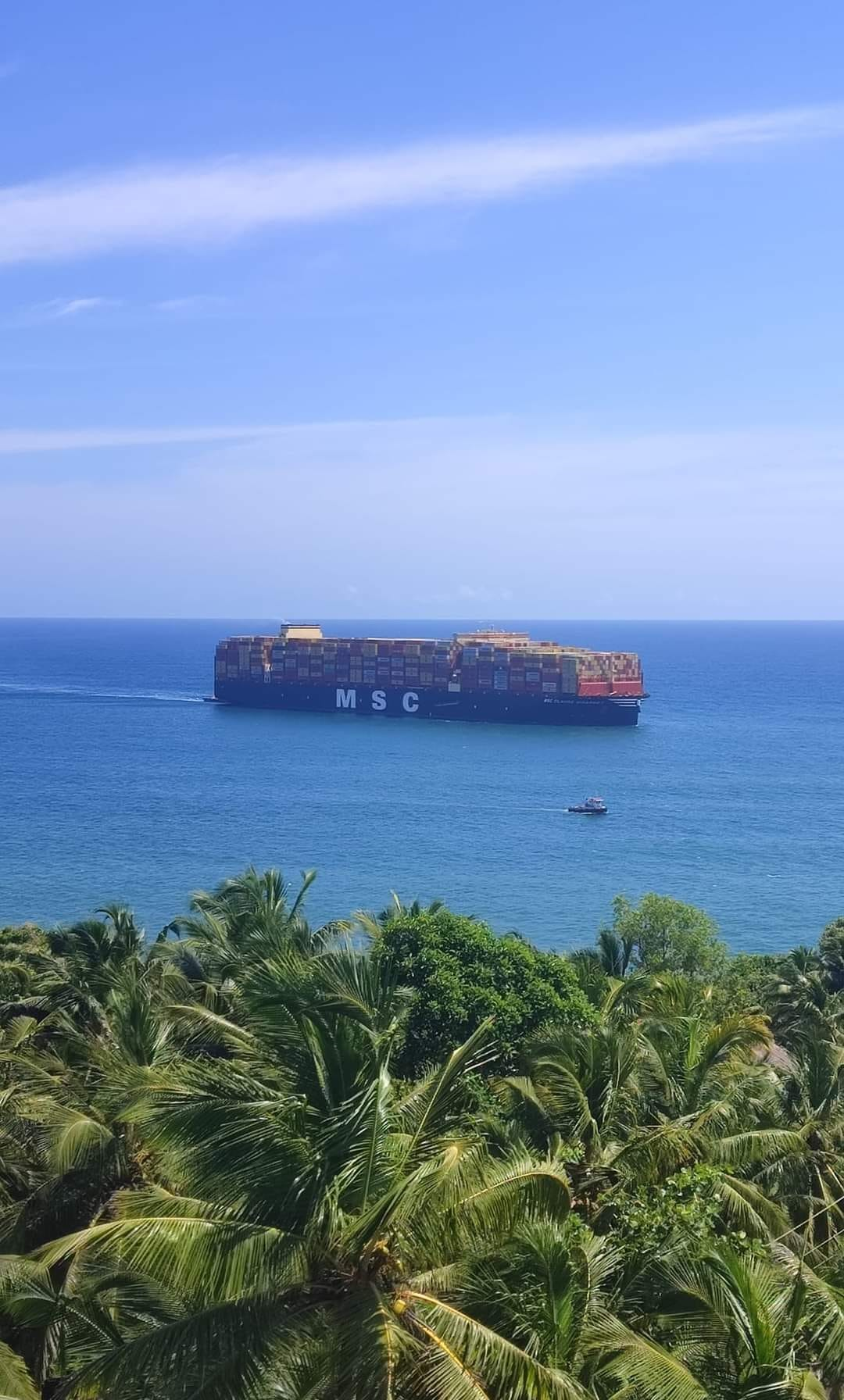
An MSC ship arriving at the port

The port will include two breakwaters, a harbour basin and wharfs. In phase one, a 3,180-metre (10,430 ft) breakwater – a main 3,040-metre (9,970 ft) breakwater and a 140-metre (460 ft) extension for fishing – was developed. Most of the 10-plus berths (2000m overall length) can accommodate large ships. A 500-metre (1,600 ft) multipurpose berth has been designed for luxury cruise ships. The port has an 800-metre (2,600 ft) berth capable of handling 18,000-TEU container vessels and a container yard behind its wharf with a depth of up to 500 metres (1,600 feet). The fish-landing centre has a 500-metre (1,600 ft) berth, a 100-metre (330 ft) port-craft berth and a 120-metre (390 ft) Coast Guard berth. The Indian Navy has storage and operation facilities and a 500-metre-long (1,600 ft) berth.

=== Cruise terminal ===
The port provides access to beaches, historical sites and cultural attractions in Kerala, including Kovalam, Varkala, Thiruvananthapuram, and the Padmanabhaswamy Temple. A planned 600-metre cruise terminal with a multipurpose 620-metre berth is also under development.

Additionally, a 20-acre cruise village is proposed to support cruise tourism operations, designed as an integrated passenger hub featuring immigration and customs clearance facilities, cruise passenger lounges, baggage handling systems, tourist information centres, and dedicated transport connectivity to nearby destinations. The project also includes retail and duty-free shopping areas, restaurants, cultural experience zones showcasing Kerala’s heritage, and facilities for tour operators to facilitate shore excursions, aiming to position Vizhinjam as a major international cruise gateway on India’s southern coast.

=== Crew changes ===
Vizhinjam International Seaport Thiruvananthapuram is expected to be a convenient crew-change point for vessels in the Indian Ocean region. Its proximity to Thiruvananthapuram International Airport, 16 km (9.9 mi) from the seaport, facilitates crew changes.The port supported crew changes for 736 vessels during the COVID-19 pandemic in 2020 and 2021. The first crew change during the trial run was made in August 2024.

=== Bunkering ===
The port is expected to become an important destination for bunkering and a significant port of call due to its location, about 10 nautical miles from a major international east–west shipping route. Its master plan provides for a liquid storage area for a bunkering-tank farm and associated utilities in the initial phase.

== Location ==
=== Suez-to-Singapore route ===
Vizhinjam International Seaport Thiruvananthapuram is about 11 nautical miles from the Suez-to-Singapore/Far East route, a corridor connecting Europe to Asia via the Suez Canal. The route begins in the Mediterranean Sea, where ships transit the Suez Canal into the Red Sea, navigate the Bab-el-Mandeb Strait, and continue through the Gulf of Aden and Arabian Sea. It then crosses the Indian Ocean, often passing through the Strait of Malacca, before reaching Singapore and other major ports in the Far East. The route has significant traffic.

=== Gulf-to-Singapore route ===
The Gulf-to-Singapore route connects the Persian Gulf to Asia. From the gulf, ships navigate the Strait of Hormuz into the Gulf of Oman and proceed into the Arabian Sea. The route continues across the Indian Ocean (often passing through the Strait of Malacca) before reaching Singapore and other major ports in the Far East.

== Administration ==
The port is a special-purpose company owned by the government of Kerala. In 2015, Adani Ports & SEZ (APSEZ) signed a 40-year agreement with the Kerala government to build and maintain the port. Under the private-public partnership agreement, the Adani Group would design, develop, finance, and operate the port for ₹7,525 crore. They would have the right to operate the port under licence for the first 40 years, and for an additional 20 years if they build the second phase of the project at their own expense during the first 30 years.

Port administration
Position	Name	Affiliation/Notes
	V.D.Satheesan	Chief Minister of Kerala, Minister for Ports, Kerala
	Dr. A Kowsigan IAS	Secretary, Department of Ports, Government of Kerala
Managing Director (MD)	Geromic George, IAS	Vizhinjam International Seaport Limited (VISL)
Chief executive officer (CEO)	Sreekumar K Nair	Appointed by Adani Ports
Project director	C. P. Pradeep	Vizhinjam International Seaport Limited
Operator	Adani Vizhinjam Port Pvt. Ltd. (AVPPL)	Subsidiary of Adani Ports & SEZ
Owner	Government of Kerala	Through VISL, a state subsidiary

== Connectivity ==
=== Road ===
National Highway 66 (NH 66), about 1.7 kilometres from the port, runs parallel to the coast and links Thiruvananthapuram and Kanyakumari. It also runs to Cochin Port via NH 966A. Kanyakumari is a few hours' drive from Vizhinjam. NH 44 (India's longest) extends from Srinagar in the north to Kanyakumari in the south, crossing Jammu and Kashmir, Punjab, Haryana, Uttar Pradesh, Madhya Pradesh, Maharashtra, Telangana, Andhra Pradesh, and Tamil Nadu. The four-lane Thiruvananthapuram Bypass includes a 2-km approach road from the port. A six-lane Outer Ring Road (ORR) is planned to connect Vizhinjam and Navaikulam, improving access to the port.

=== Rail ===
The third longest railway tunnel in India, in the initial-approval phase, will link the Vizhinjam International Seaport Thiruvananthapuram with the Southern Railway zone main line in Balaramapuram. The tunnel is being built with the New Austrian tunneling method (NATM). The 9.02-kilometre-long tunnel reaches a depth of 25–30 metres. Freight trains from the port will traverse the tunnel in 36 minutes, maintaining an average speed of 15-30 kilometres per hour (km/h). The port's link to the Indian Railways network facilitates container transport across India, and the main line connects major cities in Kerala and beyond. The Konkan Railway zone accesses the western states. The southern coastal route connects Tamil Nadu and other regions, and the project has received environmental clearance.

=== Air ===
Trivandrum International Airport is 15 kilometres from Vizhinjam International Seaport Thiruvananthapuram. The airport and seaport are managed by the Adani Group.

== Protest by fishing communities ==
The local fishing communities had been protesting against the port, The protests intensified in August 2022, when hundreds of fishermen gathered at the main entrance of the project site. The fishing community, led by the Roman Catholic Archdiocese of Trivandrum (representing the Catholic fishermen), took a leading role in the insurgency. The archdiocese said that the project has caused severe sea erosion, which has adversely affected the livelihood and homes of 56,000 people. Archdiocesan vicar general Eugine H. Pereira expressed concern that the project would harm southern Kerala fishermen, saying that they were fighting for survival and accusing the ruling and opposition parties of questionable dealings with the Adani Group. The protesters' chief demand was for a halt in construction until an environmental impact assessment was conducted. Rehabilitation of families who lost their homes to sea erosion, steps to mitigate coastal erosion, financial assistance to fishermen when weather warnings are issued, compensation to families of those who died in fishing accidents, subsidised kerosene, and the dredging of the Muthalappozhi fishing harbour in Anchuthengu in Thiruvananthapuram district were other demands by the community. More than 100 families reportedly lost their homes in coastal erosion in 2021, but there is no data on relocated families other than parochial records. Studies concluded that the port construction has no impact on coastal erosion. About 300 families were living in schools and camps, and many others were staying in rented accommodation or with relatives after Cyclone Ockhi.

During the night of 27 November 2022, a group of fishermen attacked the Vizhinjam police station. Police reported that the group was led by the Catholic Church, and 30 officers were injured in the attack. Attackers demanded the release of five protesters who had been detained the previous day. On 6 December, the protests were called off after talks between protesters and the government.

== Legal dispute ==
The government of Kerala and Adani Group have been embroiled in a legal dispute over the delay in completion of the project. The project was delayed after Adani repeatedly invoked force majeure to explain its delay. The parties later agreed to arbitration to resolve the dispute.

== See also ==
- Transport in India
- Sagar Mala project
- List of ports in India
- Cochin Port
- International Container Transshipment Terminal, Kochi
- International Container Transshipment Port, Galathea Bay
- Trivandrum Shipyard Poovar

== Sources ==
- AECOM (2013). Consultancy Services for Preparation of Detailed Project Report for Development of Vizhinjam Port (PDF) (Report). AECOM India Private Limited.
