= Neeleeswaram =

- Village
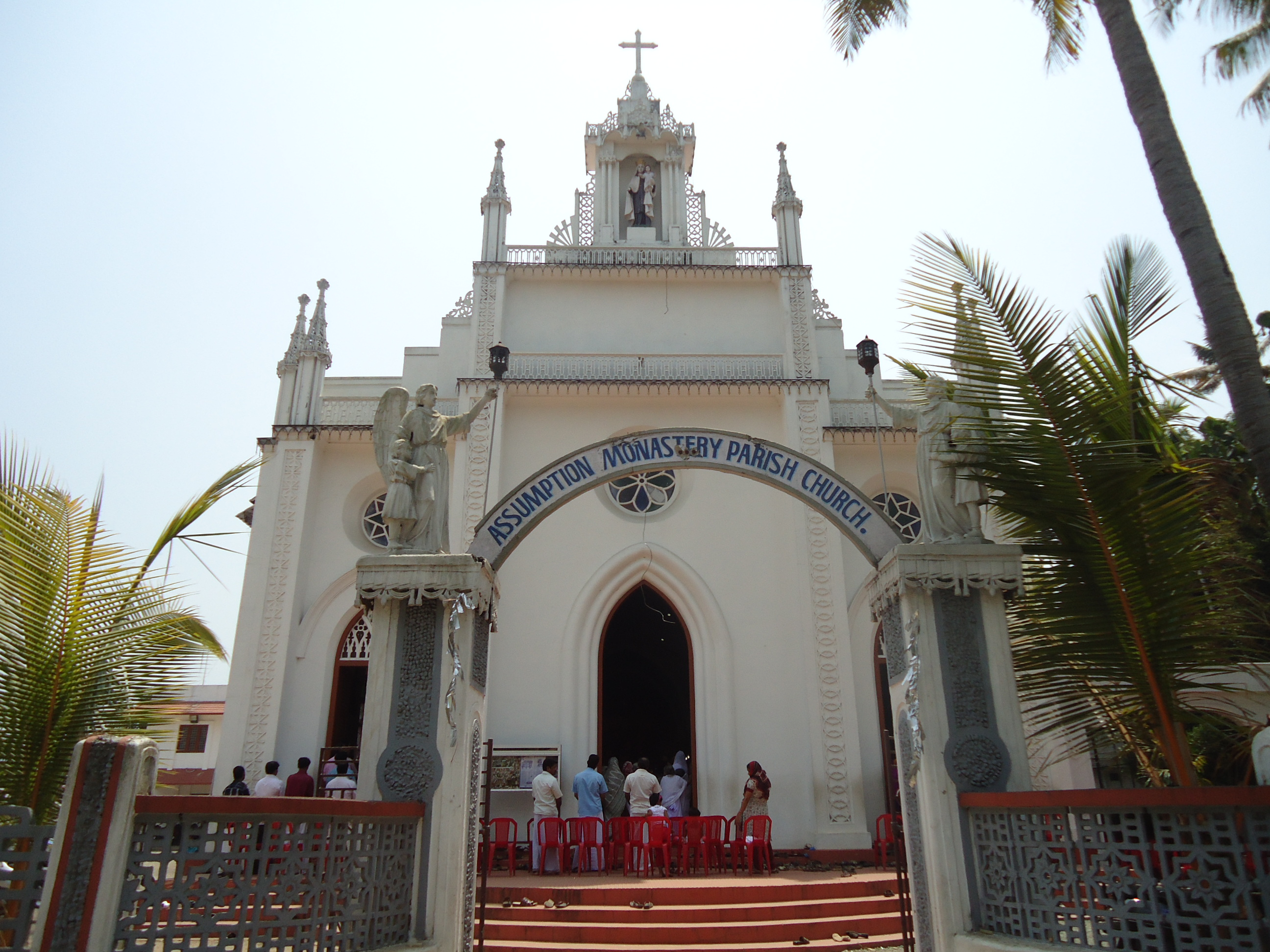
- Assumption Monastery Parish Church, Neeleeswaram

- Location in Kerala Neeleeswaram (India)
- Coordinates: 10°11′0″N 76°28′0″E
- Country: India
- State: Kerala
- District: Ernakulam

Government
  - Body: Malayattoor-Neeleeswaram Grama Panchayat

Languages
- Time zone: UTC+5:30 (IST)
- PIN: 683574
- Telephone code: 0484
- Vehicle registration: KL-63
- Nearest cities: Angamaly, Kalady
- Lok Sabha constituency: Chalakudy
- Civic agency: Malayattoor-Neeleeswaram Grama Panchayat

Neeleeswaram is a small village located in the Ernakulam district of Kerala, India. It is on the way to the famous St. Thomas pilgrimage centre in Malayattoor.

The Periyar River flows through the south of the village.

Neeleeswaram is part of the Malayattoor-Neeleeswaram Grama Panchayat. Near the main junction of Neeleeswaram are the Panchayat Office, Assumption Monastery Parish Church, SNDP Branch, and LP School.

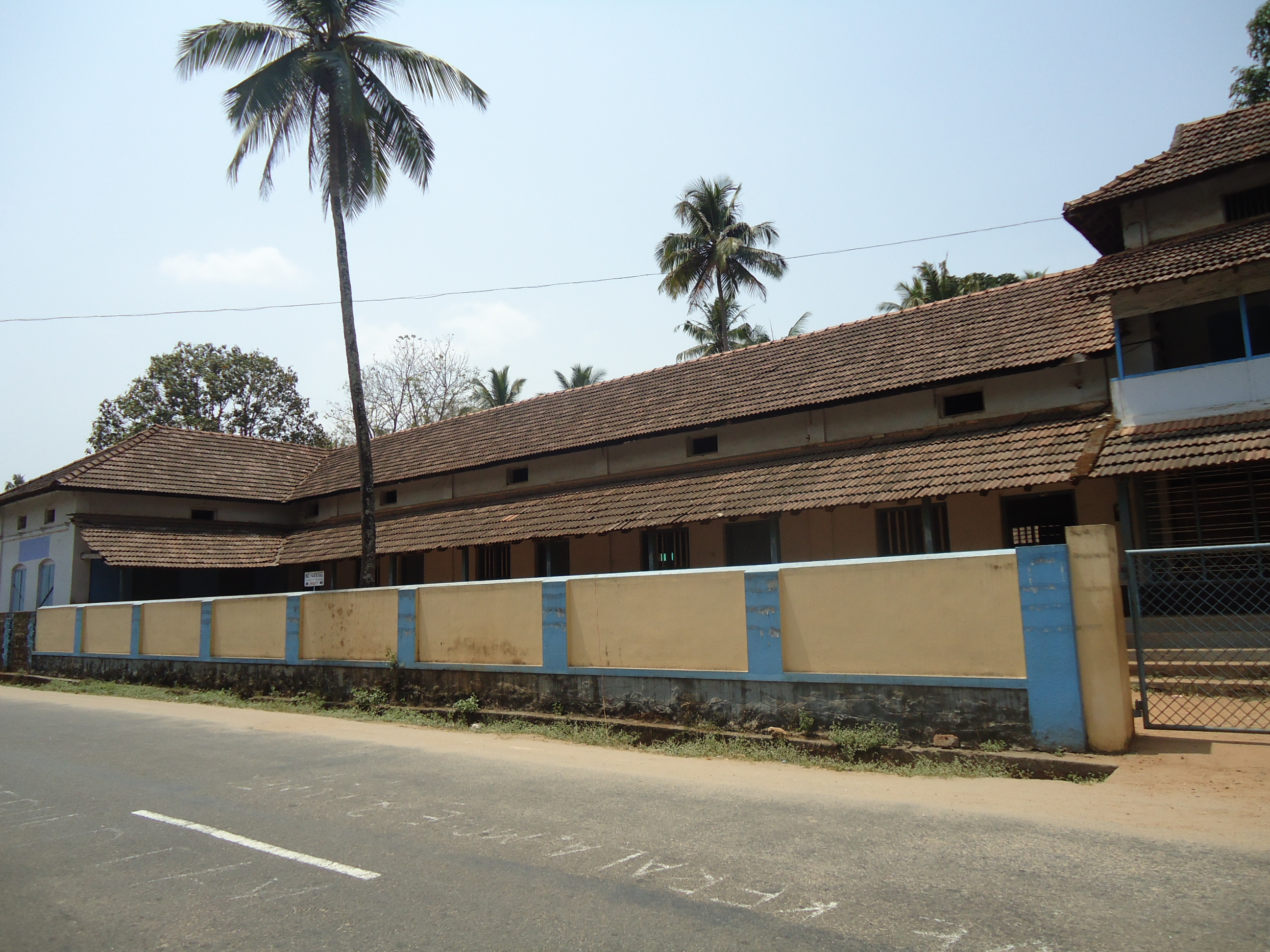
SNDP High School Neeleeswaram 1

== History ==
The east boundary of Neeleeswaram is the Pallipetta junction and a small stream of water flowing to Periyar. By the side of this stream, there is a very ancient pillar marking the boundary between the erstwhile princely states of Travancore and Cochin. The residents call this pillar the Kothi-Stone. From the Pallipetta junction, there is a road to the south leading to Pallikkadavu which is a small ferry leading to Cheranalloor St. Xaviers Church. The road leading to the north goes to a tiles factory.

Neeleeswaram junction is the center point of the road connecting the nearby villages of Kalady and Malayattoor. Govt. LP School and Cooperative Society buildings are situated at the center junction and alongside the road to Naduvattom. Naduvattom boasts a vivid view with its paddy fields and its greenery. From this junction, there is road going to the north side passing through Jeevadan Convent, YMA, YCA junction. The region comes under the Syro-Malabar Catholic Major Archeparchy of Ernakulam–Angamaly. This road, leads to another village called Naduvattom.

== Naduvattom ==
Naduvattom is a happening place in the Malayattoor-Neeleeswaram Grama Panchayat. It is a stone's throw from Neeleeswaram junction which houses the Panchayat office. It can also be approached from Chandrapura junction for those coming from Angamaly and Northern Kerala. Naduvattom is en route to the St. Thomas Shrine in Malayattoor. A huge number of pilgrims visit the shrine mostly during Good Friday and the Holy Month. Naduvattom has the St. Antony's Church in the name of Saint Anthony of Padua which also houses the parish hall for organizing cultural activities. The Naduvattom Church had celebrated its platinum jubilee in the year 2013. Sahrdaya club and Angel Club are the major recreation centres. The All Kerala Badminton Open Tournament is conducted by Sahrdaya club in January every year. Onam activities like tug of war and indoor games like chess, carrom are organized under the club every year.

== Demographics ==
Malayattoor-Neeleeswaram Grama Panchayat had a total population of 13,915 of which 7,080 are males and 6,835 are females as of census report of 2001.

== People ==
Most people follow either Catholic or Srinarayana tradition of beliefs and they are significantly peaceful minded with a great sense of religious unity. All the families are known by traditional family names such as Manjaly, Konukudy, Manavalan, Poonely, Pullan, Chiraparamban, Arackal, Thanickaparambil, Vadakkedathu, Karingen, Kidangen, Konooran, Moolan, Nadayil (Tharanilathu), Nedunkandathil, Kallookkaran, Kozhikodath, Kollamkudy, Chitten, Manickathan, Menachery etc. The Kidangen family has more than 700 members and Kozhikodath family has more than 500 members in this village.

== Medical centres ==
Dr Vineetha G P clinic is situated on the east side of the road to Naduvattom just after the main junction. There is also a Government Ayurveda Hospital on the south side of the road to Malayattoor just after a stream on the east end of Neeleeswaram. Moreover, there are various government primary health care centres in various interior parts.

== Festivals ==
Traditional festivals like Onam are celebrated with great enthusiasm. Christmas and New Year are also celebrated with great pomp and show. Temples and churches celebrate their anniversaries, popularly known as perunal, with great fervour.

== Climate ==
Under the Köppen climate classification, Neeeleeswaram features a tropical monsoon climate (Am). Neeleeswaram's proximity to the equator along with its coastal location results in little seasonal temperature variation, with moderate to high levels of humidity. Annual temperatures range between 23 and 31 °C (73 and 88 °F) with the record high being 38 °C (100 °F), and record low 17 °C (63 °F). Drought-like conditions might be prevalent (very rarely) during late February and March. During the 2018 floods, Neeleeswaram was one of the villages that was not severely affected. Only a small portion in the east of Neeleeswaram was badly affected while most of Neeleeswaram experienced only waterlogging.

Climate data for kalady, India
Month	Jan	Feb	Mar	Apr	May	Jun	Jul	Aug	Sep	Oct	Nov	Dec	Year
Mean daily maximum °C (°F)	30 (86)	31 (88)	31 (88)	31 (88)	31 (88)	28 (82)	28 (82)	28 (82)	28 (82)	29 (84)	30 (86)	30 (86)	30 (86)
Mean daily minimum °C (°F)	23 (73)	25 (77)	26 (79)	26 (79)	26 (79)	25 (77)	24 (75)	24 (75)	25 (77)	25 (77)	25 (77)	23 (73)	25 (77)
Average precipitation mm (inches)	20 (0.8)	20 (0.8)	40 (1.6)	120 (4.7)	310 (12.2)	560 (22.0)	520 (20.5)	340 (13.4)	240 (9.4)	310 (12.2)	160 (6.3)	40 (1.6)	2,740 (107.9)
Source: Weatherbase

== Education ==
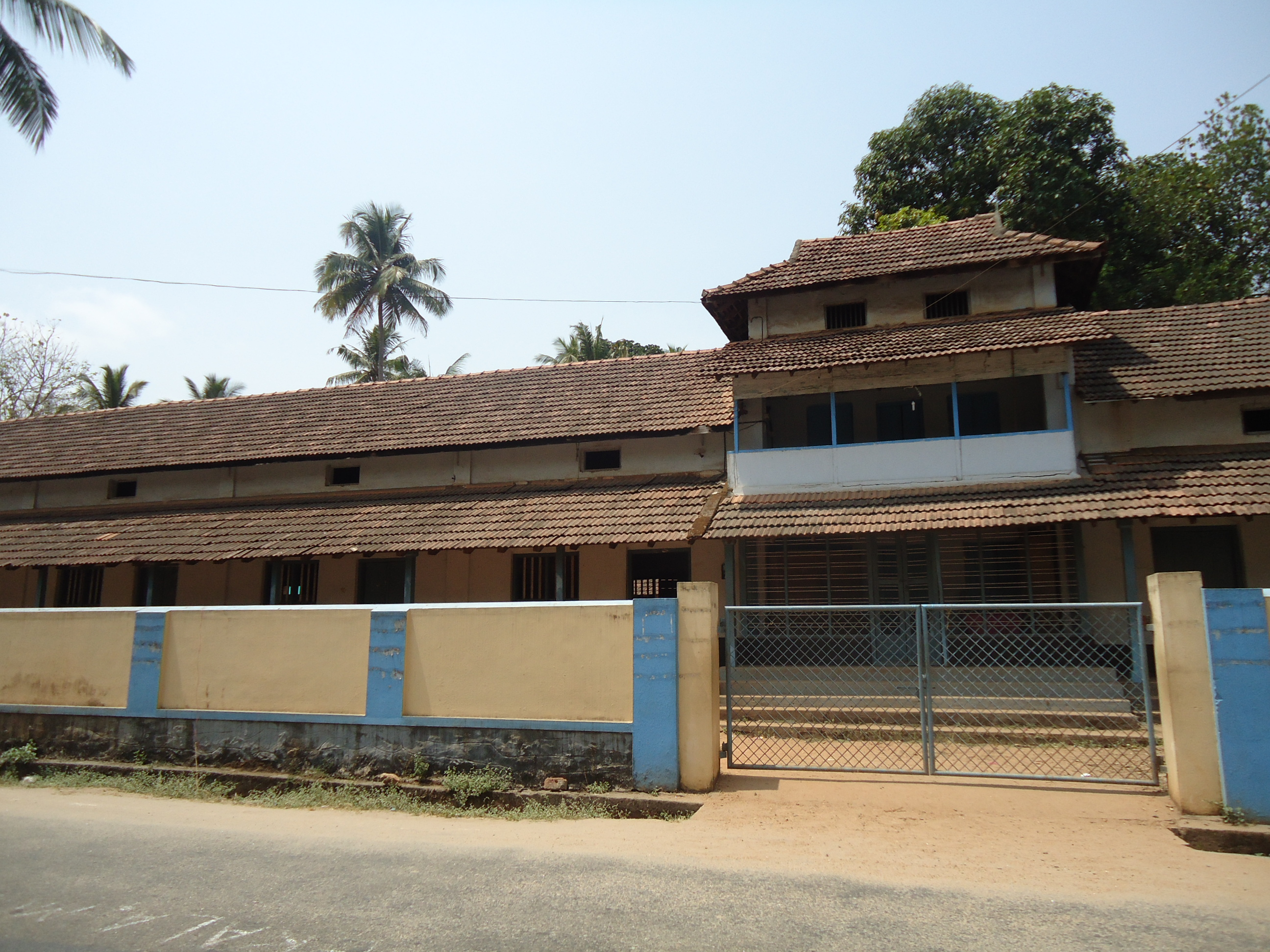
SNDP High School Neeleeswaram

1. SNDP HSS Neeleeswaram
2. St. Thomas HSS Malayattoor
3. Govt. LP School

Glps Neeleeswaram is a Primary only School in Kalady Village of Angamaly. It was established in the year 1950 and the school management is Department of Education. It's a Malayalam medium, co-educational school.

== Industries ==
This region is in the foothills of the Western Ghats, so rubber plantations are plenty in number. Also various herbs are available in the forests which are used for making ayurvedic medicines. Bamboo corporation, crusher units are the major industries operating in this area. Heavy vehicles carrying rocks and soil are a common sight on the roads.

== Nearest railway station ==
Angamaly for Kalady (limited stop), Aluva (major stop).

== Nearest airport ==
Cochin International Airport is about 10 kilometres from Neeleeswaram-Naduvattom.

== Tourism ==
Athirapilly, Vazhachal are some 20 kilometres from this place. This attracts tourists from all over Kerala. Also the international shrine of Malayattoor welcomes a huge number of pilgrims. Kalady-the birthplace of Adi Shankaracharya is also a popular destination.
