= Malayattoor (disambiguation) =

Malayattoor is a town in the Ernakulam district of Kerala, India

Malayattoor may also refer to:

- Malayattoor Ramakrishnan, a novelist from Kerala, India
- Malayattoor Saint Thomas Church, in Kerala, India
