= Naduvattom =

Naduvattom or Naduvattam can refer to:

- Naduvattom, Malappuram, Kerala, India
- Naduvattam, Nilgiris, Tamil Nadu, India
- Naduvattam (Ernakulam), Kerala, India
