= St. Thomas Syro-Malabar Church, Malayattoor =

St Thomas International Shrine
- St Thomas International Shrine, Malayattoor, Angamaly
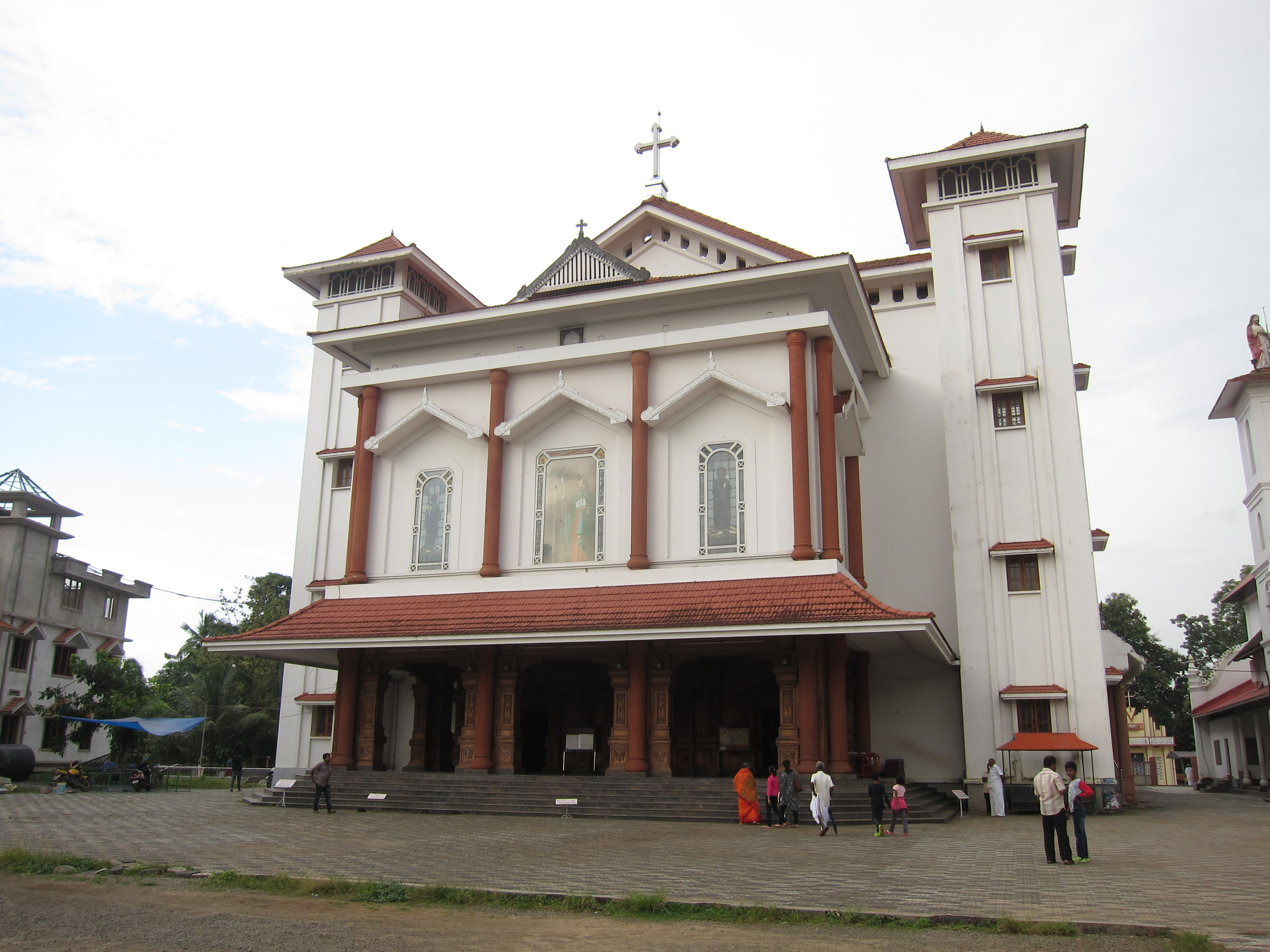

- Location of Malayattoor International Shrine, Angamaly in Kerala.
- 10.216°N 76.509°E
- Location: Malayattoor Angamaly, Ernakulam, Kerala
- Country: India
- Denomination: Syro-Malabar Catholic (International Shrine)

The St Thomas Syro Malabar Catholic International Shrine, Malayattoor (or Malayatoor Church or മലയാറ്റൂർ വി. തോമാശ്ലീഹാ സീറോ-മലബാർ തീർത്ഥാടനപള്ളി) is one of the eleven international shrines in the world, situated in Malayattoor Angamaly, Ernakulam district of Kerala, India.

The Malayatoor Church attracts many devotees not just India, but from all over the world. The church is associated with the evangelisation activity of St. Thomas the Apostle in Kerala. The church has been designated by the Vatican as one of the eight International shrines in the world. It is believed that St. Thomas held prayer at the place where the church is situated when he landed in Kerala. The hilltop church is located 15 km away from the town of Kalady. Malayatoor and Kodanad villages are located on the opposite banks of the Periyar river with unspoiled and rustic views of the surroundings.

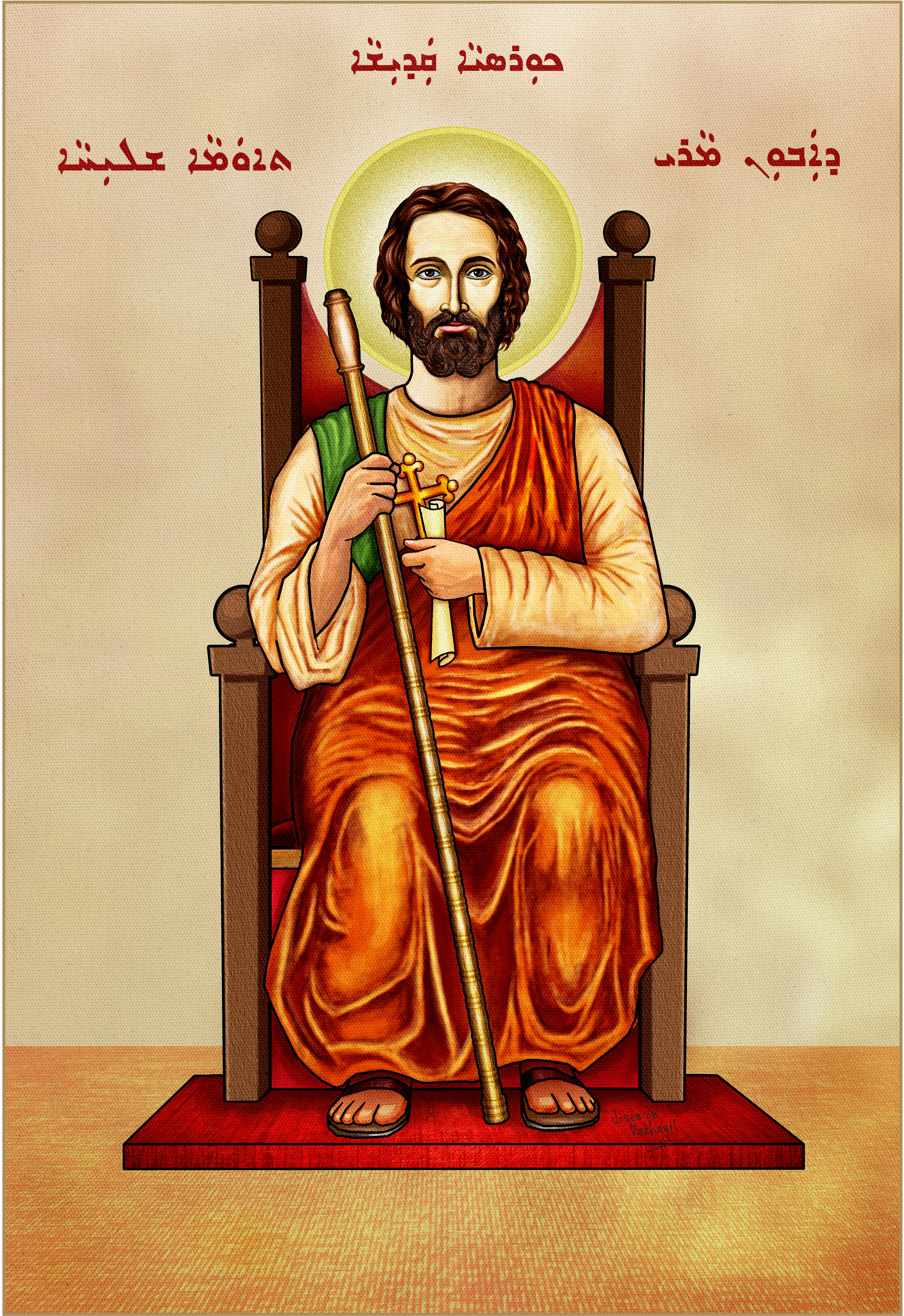
Icon of Throne of Mar Thoma Sleeha. November 21 : The Feast of the Arrival of Mar Thoma Sleeha in India and The Feast of the Throne of the Mar Thoma Sleeha

== History ==
St. Thomas is believed to have landed at Kodungallur (Cranganore) in Kerala in AD 52. In AD 62, St. Thomas returned to Malankara coast via Malayatur where he establishes ‘the half church’ (a small Christian community dependent on the Church of Maliamkara).

Oral tradition says that while travelling through Malayattor, faced with hostile natives, he fled to the hilltop where he said to have remained in prayer and that he left his footprint on one of the rocks. According to beliefs, during prayer, he touched a rock, upon which blood poured from it.

The Church was discovered by the Portuguese in 1501, and they record that upon arrival in the region in AD52, St Thomas converted King Chozha Perumal of Meliapor by dragging a large log ashore that elephants had been unable to move. The relics of St Thomas were returned to Edessa in Syria in the 3rd century. In the 4th century the Church of St Thomas was in decline, so large group of Christians from Edessa emigrated to Malabar. They were led by Mar Joseph, Metropolitan of Edessa, and Knai Thoma, a merchant who had previously visited Malabar and found the Christian community there in need of support.

The main festival of the Church on the first Sunday after Easter, which is when the resurrection of Jesus Christ, the Son of God, occurs. It is traditionally believed that St. Thomas used to make the Sign of the Cross on the rock, kiss it and pray at Kurisumudi. The story has it that a miraculous golden cross appeared at that particular spot. Pilgrims going up the hill call out incessantly "Ponnum Kurishu Muthappo, Ponmala Kayattom", meaning "''O Patriarch of the Golden Cross! Climb we shall, this golden hill!''"

This Shrine was promoted to Archdiocesan status by Major Archbishop Mar Varkey Cardinal Vithayathil on 4 September 1998. There is also an ancient Church in the name of St Thomas (Estd. 900 AD) at Malayattoor on the banks of Periyar River which serves as the parish Church at present. The annual festival of this church is known as 'Malayatoor Perunal' and it is celebrated in the months of March–April.

== Kurisumudi ==
Kurishumudi (Hill of the holy cross) is a mountain at Malayattoor, that has its fame as a place visited by St. Thomas, one of the 12 Apostles of Jesus Christ. Jesus gave a mandate to his Apostles to go out to the whole world and to proclaim the Good News. Thomas set out to India and landed at Kodungalloor in AD 52. A hostile reception was given and his life was in danger. He was forced to flee to the top of the mountain and had spent days in the abode of God. In deep anguish and agony, St. Thomas prayed to the Lord and he made a sign of the cross on the rock. The Mother of Our Lord, Blessed Mary, appeared to console and strengthens him. He descended from the top hill and continued his journey to Mylapoore in Tamil Nadu. Later on the hunters went to the mountain for hunting. While they stayed in the night they saw a glittering sign of cross on the rock. Out of curiosity they struck there with their rude weapons. To their surprise blood gushed out. They ran to the valley and told the locals. They went to the mountain and while they prayed there they got many miracles. This is the humble beginning of Pilgrimage to Kurishumudi

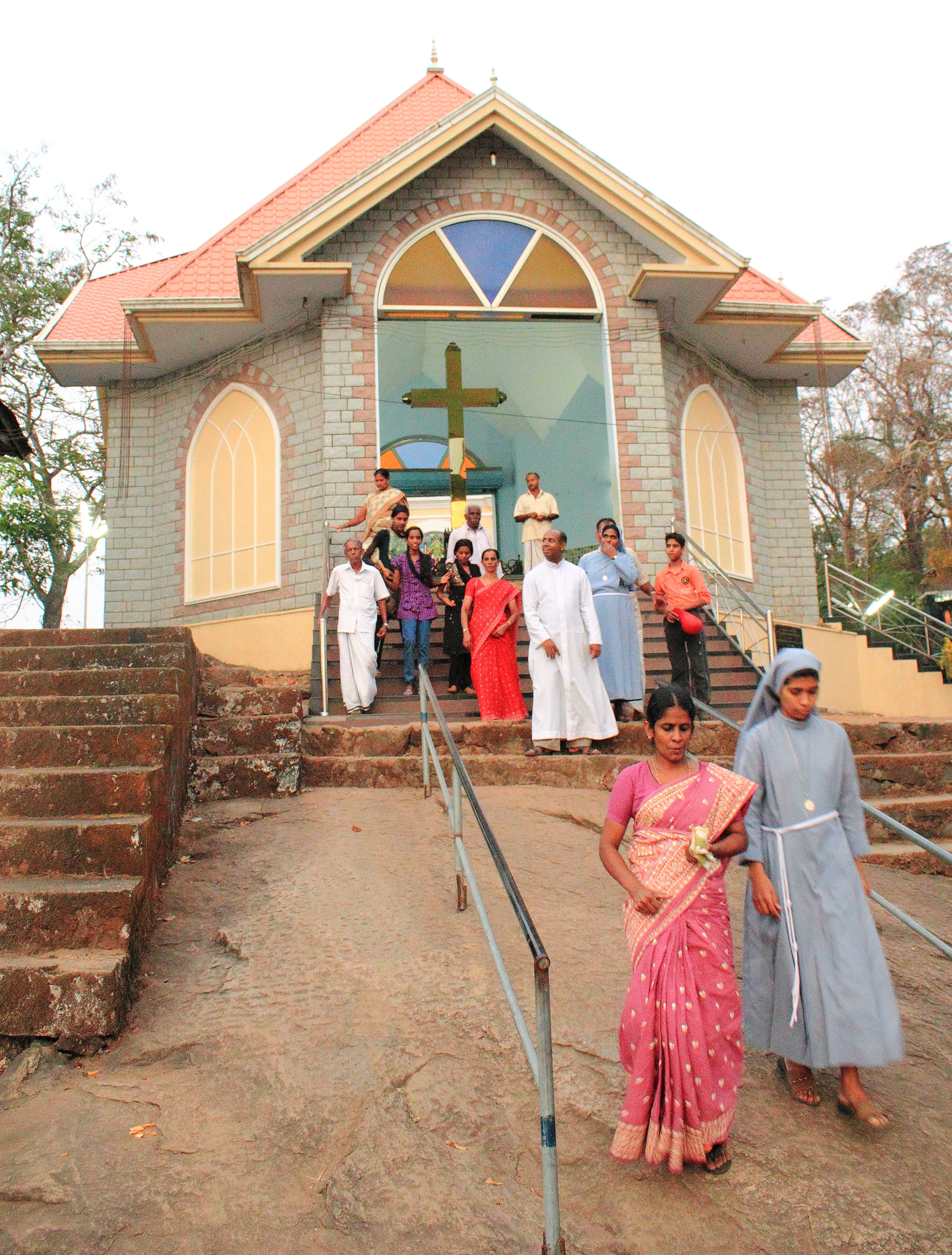
Ponnum Kurishu

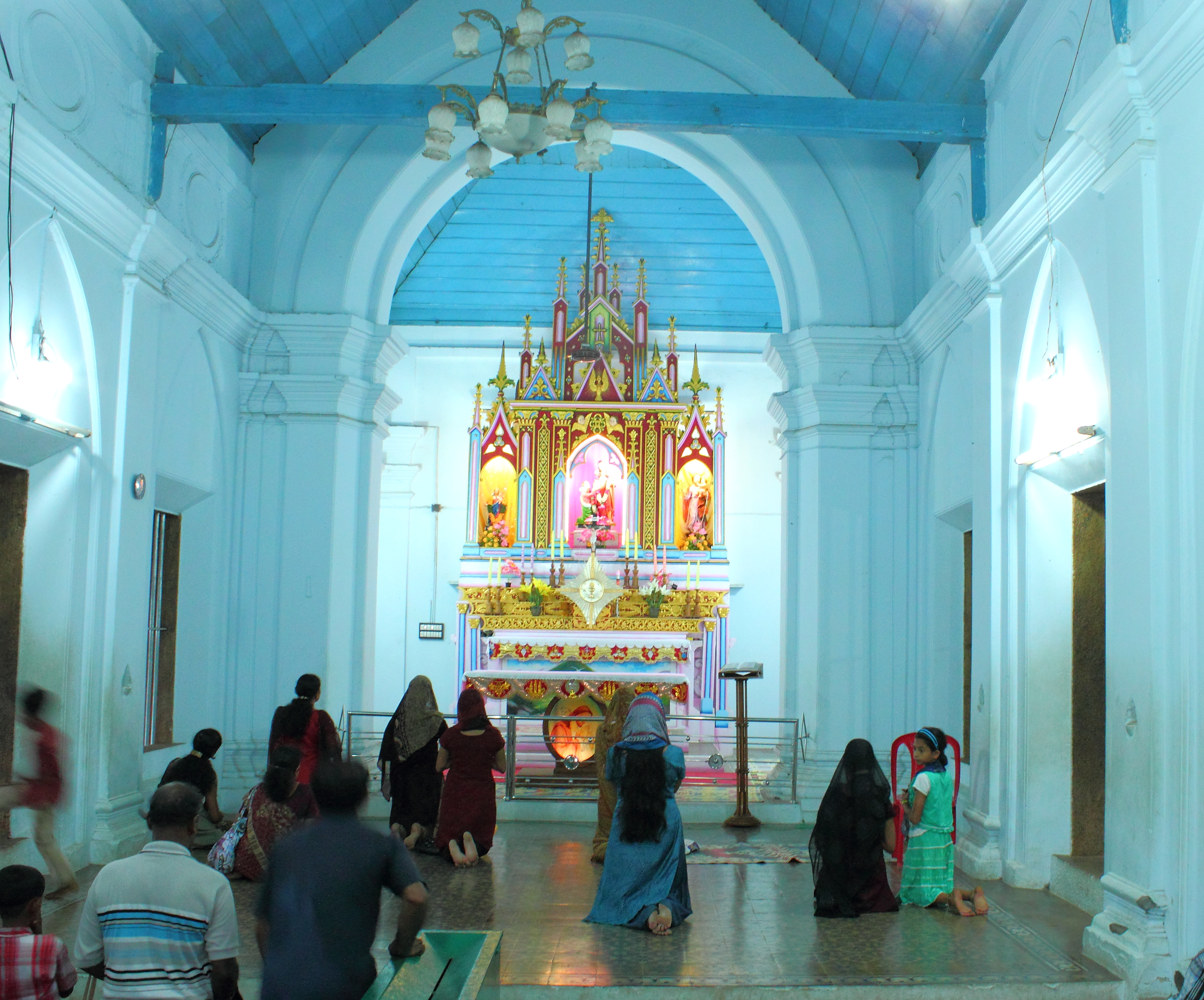
Kurishumudi church

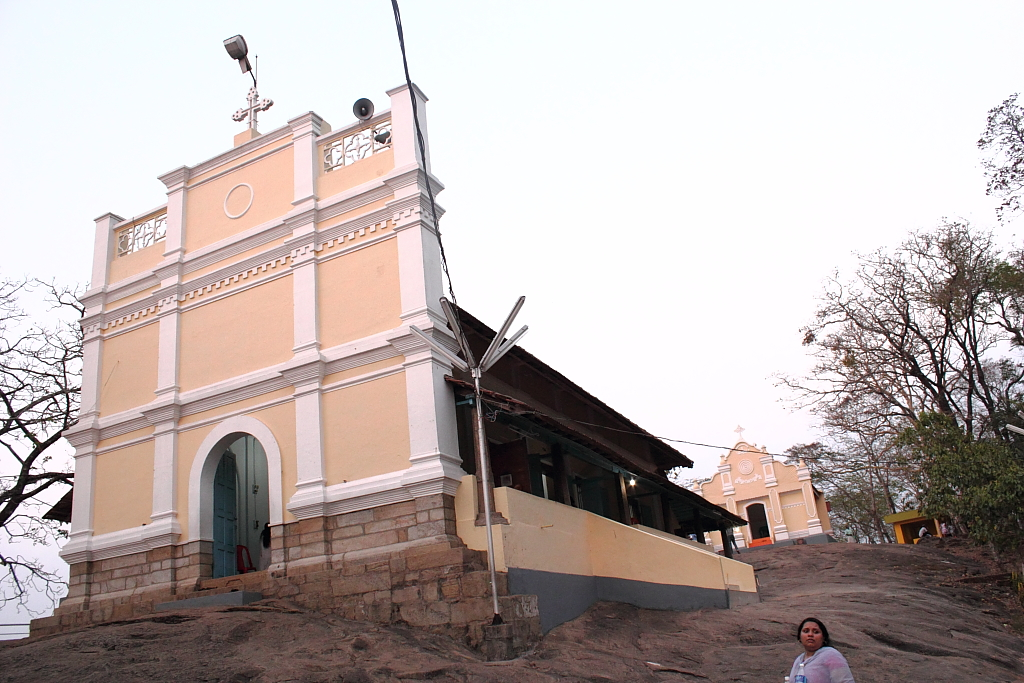
ST. Thomas Church, Kurishumudi

=== Golden Cross ===
Kurishumudi is where one can find the Golden Cross believed to have formed when St. Thomas knelt on a rock and signed a cross with his finger. He remained there praying for a long time, and ultimately a golden cross appeared on the spot. The church was later built on that cross, and another golden cross was erected right on top of that stone which remains in the center of the church.

=== Footprints of St Thomas ===
One of the most curious sights at the mountain was the permanent footprint and the marks of knees of St. Thomas imprinted on the rock. At present, the natural footprint is not there but instead there is a man-made footprint (A replica) made by the Church.

=== The ancient chapel struck by the elephants ===
An ancient chapel at Kurishumudi, was attacked by tuskers in the past when it used to be surrounded by thick jungle. Deep tusk marks can still be found on the back wall of the chapel.

=== The miraculous water spring ===
A well, situated near the ancient chapel at the top of the mount is believed to be the spot from where St. Thomas quenched his thirst during his time of prayer. Feeling thirsty, he struck the rock from which fresh water started flowing. Pilgrims consider the water in the well to possess divine power to heal ailments.

With its recent recognition by Vatican as an international pilgrim centre, this famous shrine at Malayattoor dedicated to St. Thomas would be extending its healing touch and spiritual bliss to more visitors and for those who come to enjoy its serenity.

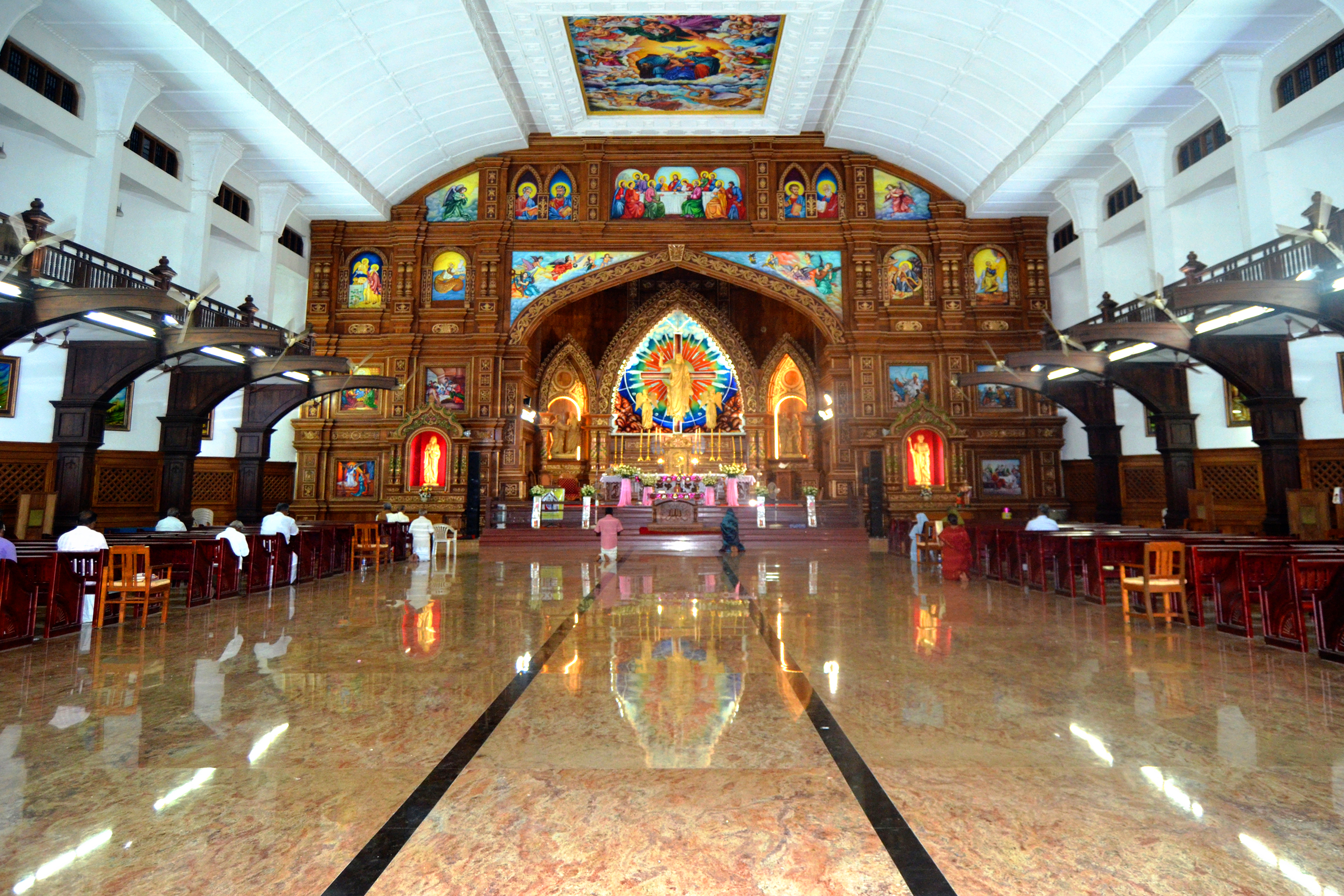
St.THOMAS CHURCH, MALAYATTOOR

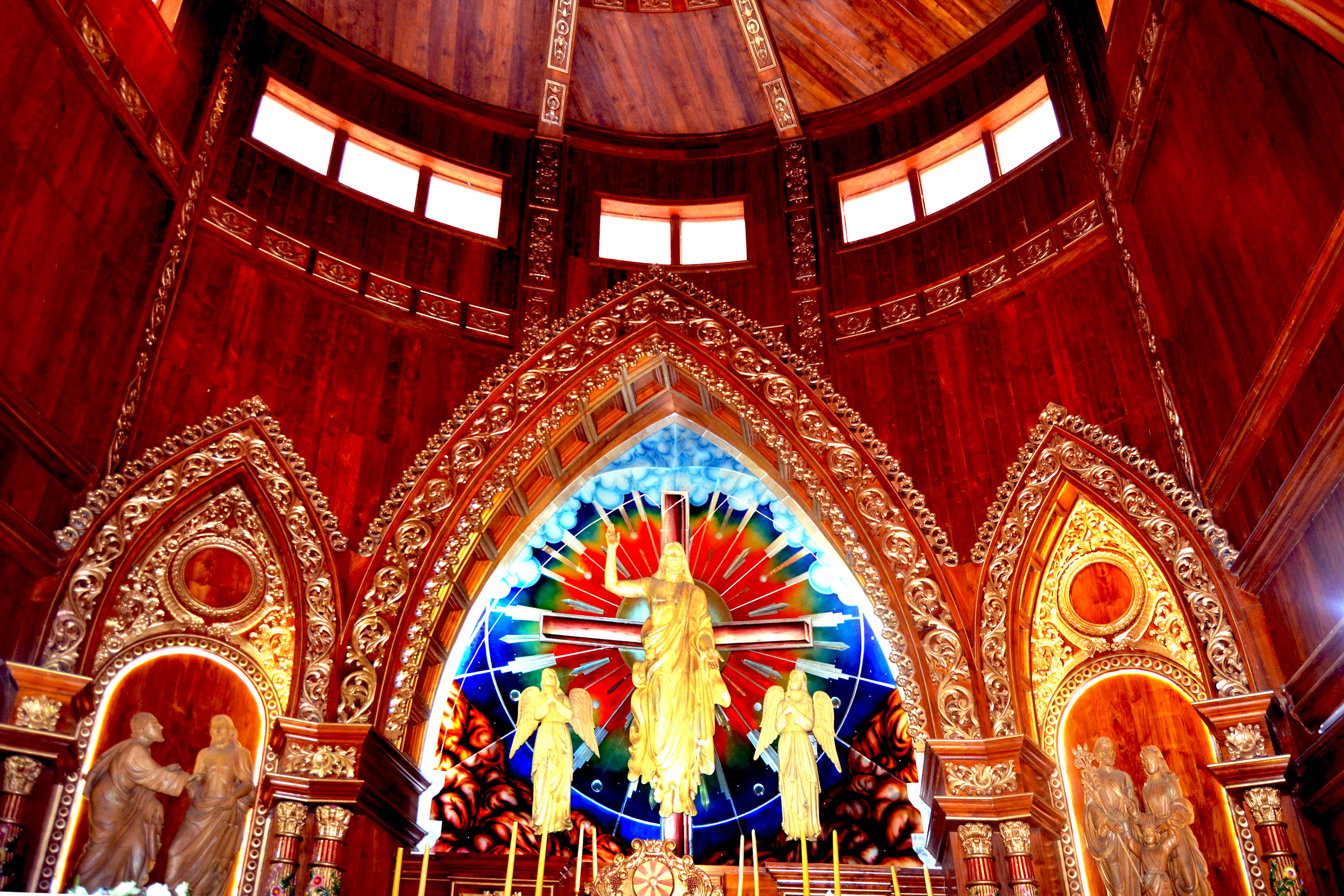
St.THOMAS CHURCH, MALAYATTOOR

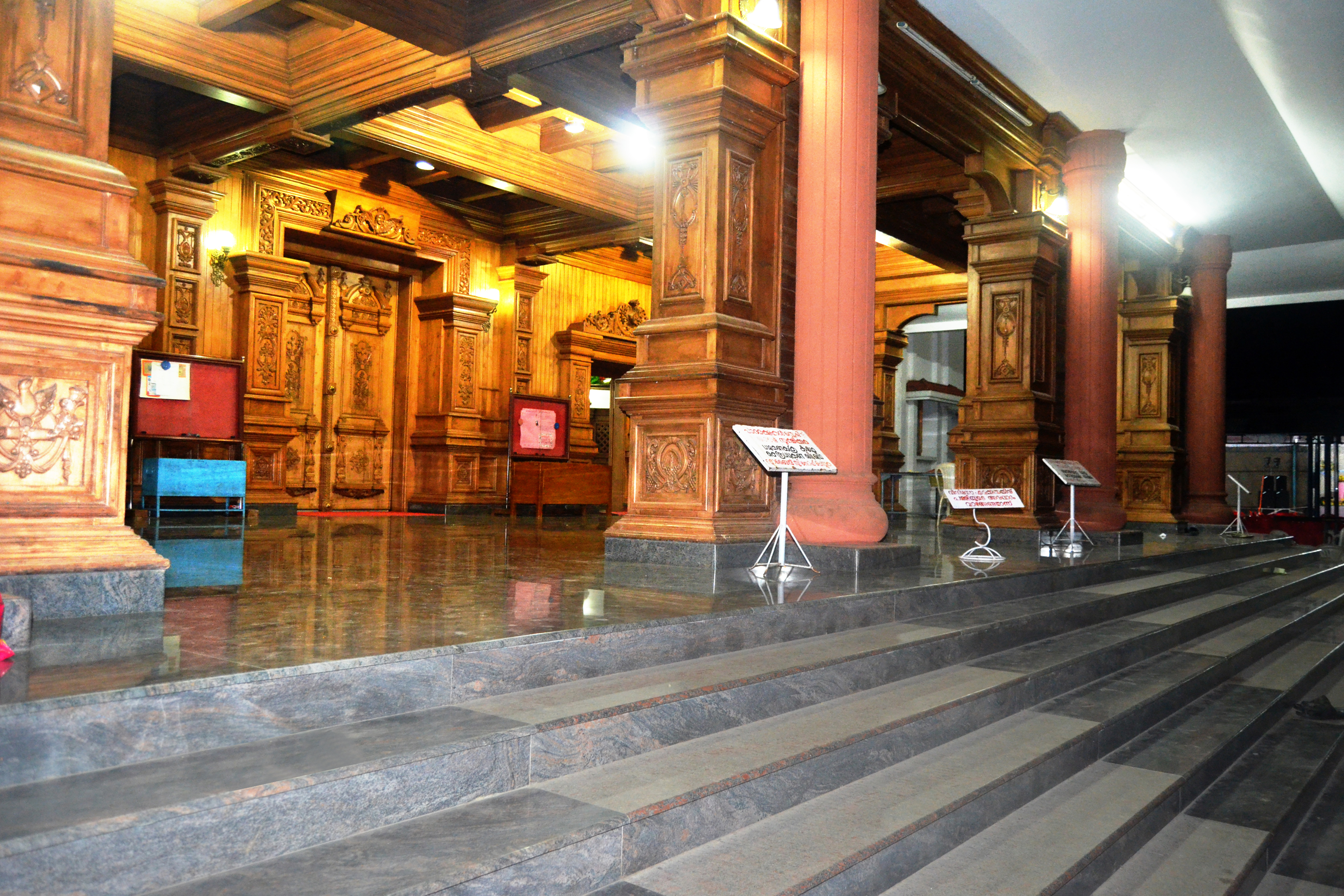
St.THOMAS CHURCH, MALAYATTOOR

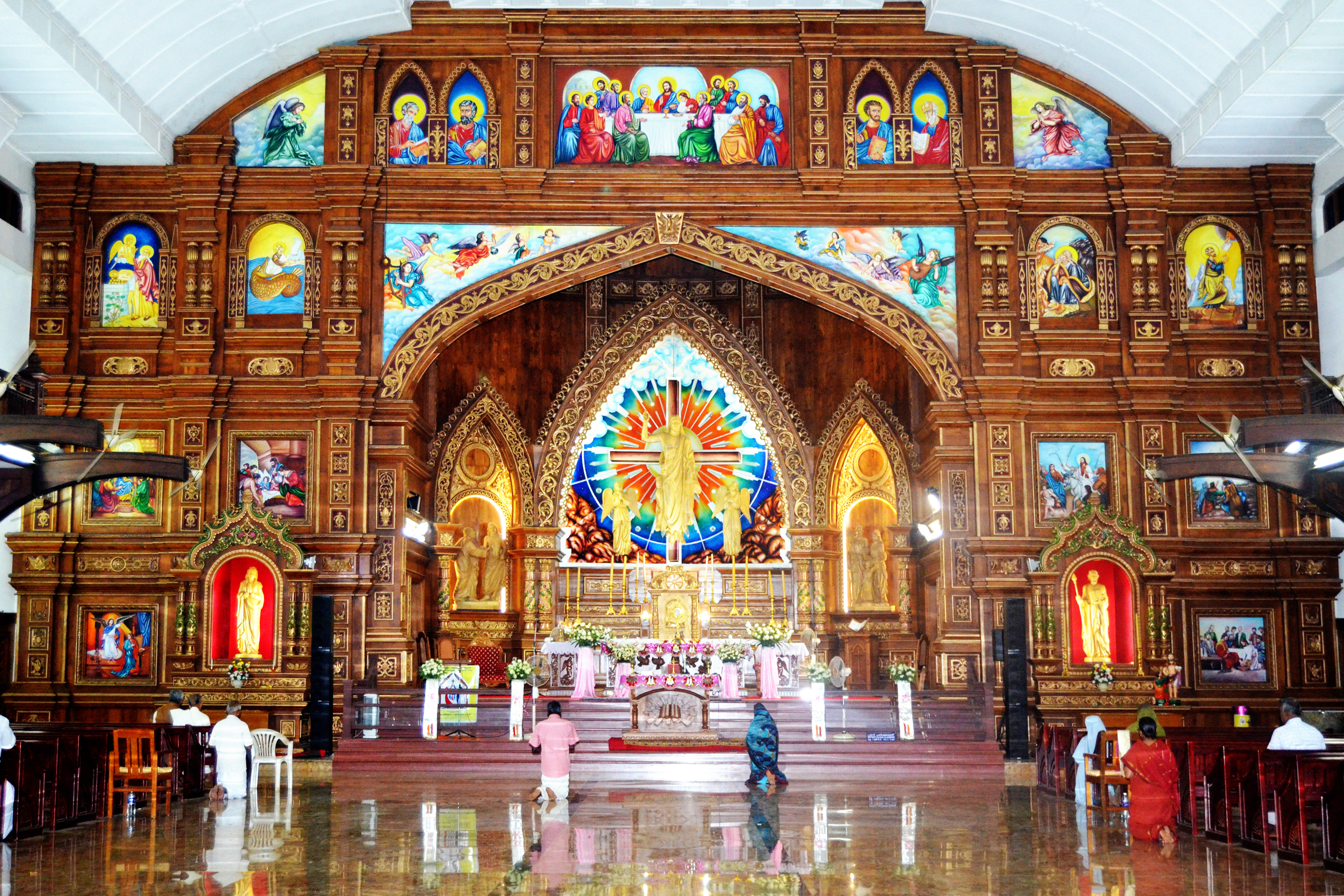
St.THOMAS CHURCH ALTAR VIEW

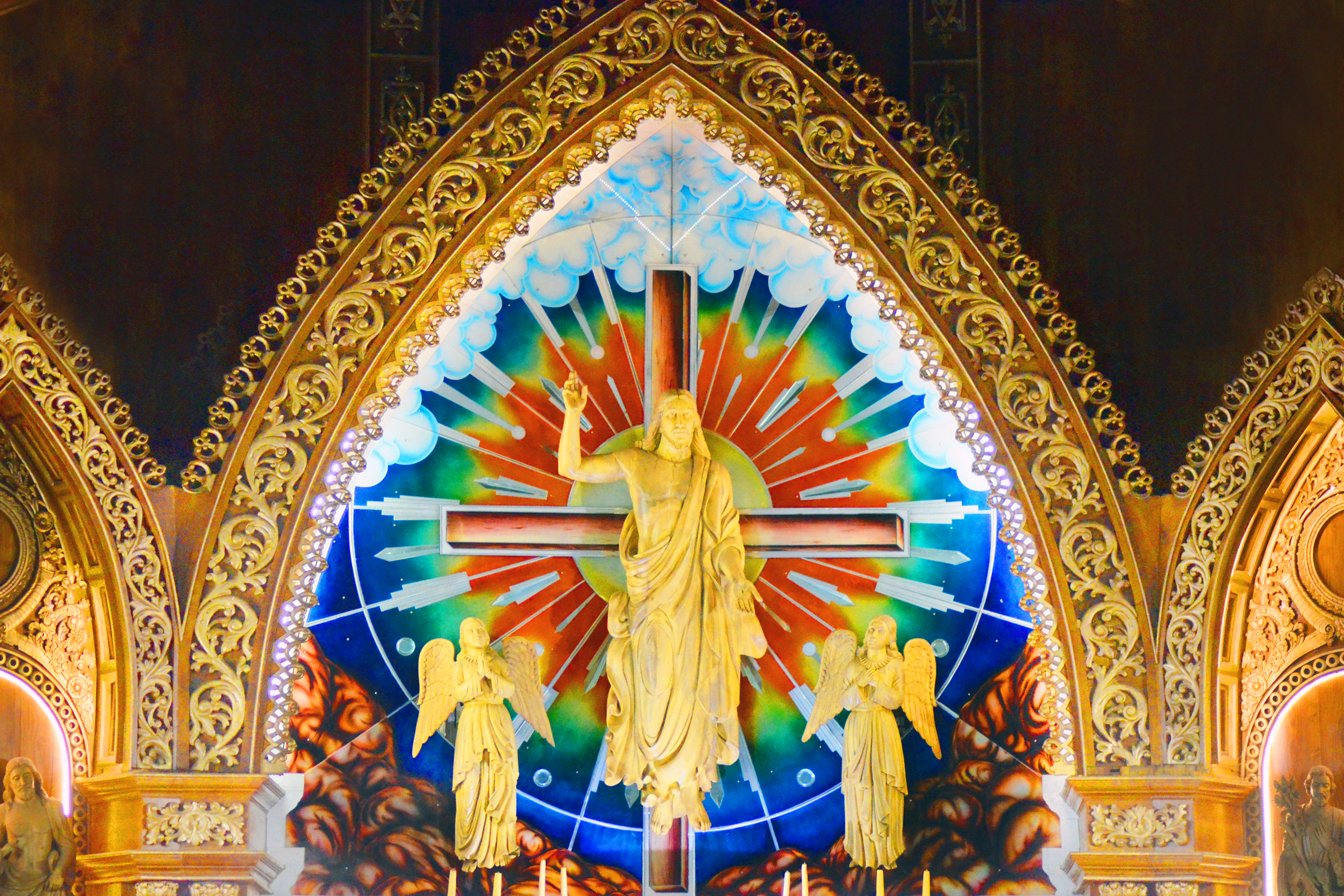
St.THOMAS CHURCH MAIN ALTAR CLOSER VIEW

== Tourist information ==
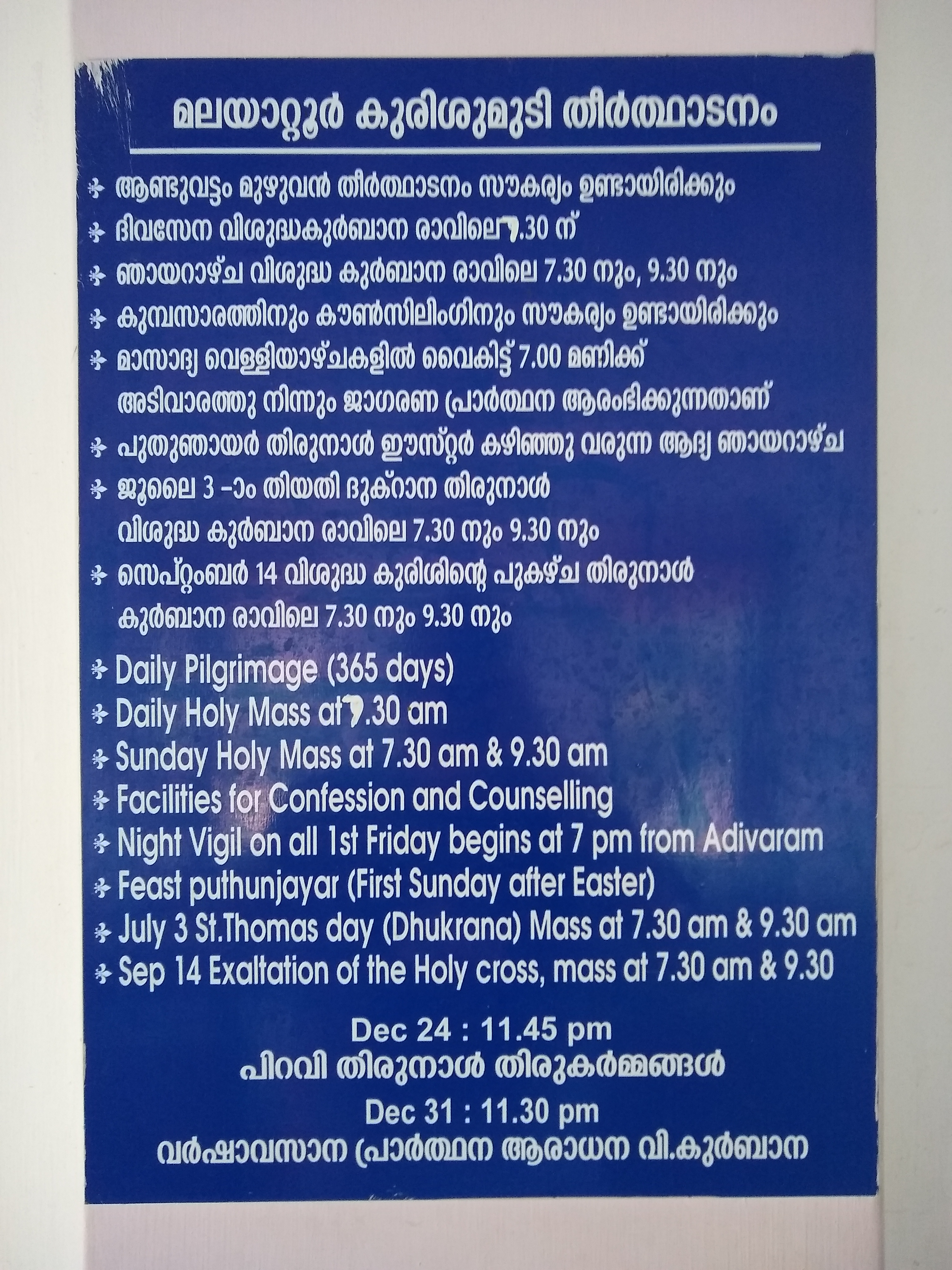
Shrine information

St. Thomas founded churches in different places in Kerala including Kollam, Kodungalloor, Nilakkal, Niranam, etc. This center is the most popular and largest St. Thomas shrine in India.

Every year on the first Sunday after Easter, thousands of pilgrims throng to this shrine to seek holy blessings. The church has been decorated with beautiful carvings, designs and paintings that depict the life of Jesus Christ. There are facilities for confession and adoration also in this church. The church also has an ancient pond that was used for baptism purposes and a traditional pulpit that is considered to be of much historical significance.

=== Mass Timings ===
There is a Holy Mass daily at 7:30 AM. On Sundays and Feast days there are two services - 7:30 AM and 9:30 AM.

The main feasts celebrated are:

- Puthunajayar - First Sunday after Easter
- Dukrana - July 3. Feast of St. Thomas
- Exalation of the Holy Cross - September 14.

== How to reach Malayattoor Church ==
By air

The Cochin International Airport is at a distance of 15 kilometers from here.

By rail

The Angamaly railway station is at a distance of 17 kilometers from Malayattoor, but since most trains do not stop at Angamaly you can get down at the next railway station Aluva (Alwaye)as most of the trains halt there.

By road

Malayattoor Church is easily reachable from anywhere in Kerala and Cochin as the place is well connected by a wide network of roads. To get to Malayatoor driving down on the NH47, one will have to take a diversion towards Kalady from Angamaly and drive all the way up to Kalady town which will take about 10 minutes. Then take a left towards Malayatoor. Folks driving down from Ernakulam / Cochin can drive up to Angamaly and take the same route or take the left towards Kalady after Cochin International Airport on the NH47. The latter route is shorter but the time taken will be a little more due to the small roads one will have to drive in.

There is a new bridge from Kodanad to Malayatoor which makes it easy for people coming from the eastern side like Kothamangalam, Munnar etc. They can take the turn at Kuruppampady towards Kodanad and reach Malayatoor in 20 minutes by car. People coming from Perumbavoor can take the Vallom - Kodanad road to access the same bridge to reach Malayatoor in less than 20 minutes.

== See also ==
- Saint Thomas Christians
- Saint Thomas Christian Churches
- Syriac Christianity
