= Naduvattam (Ernakulam) =

- Village
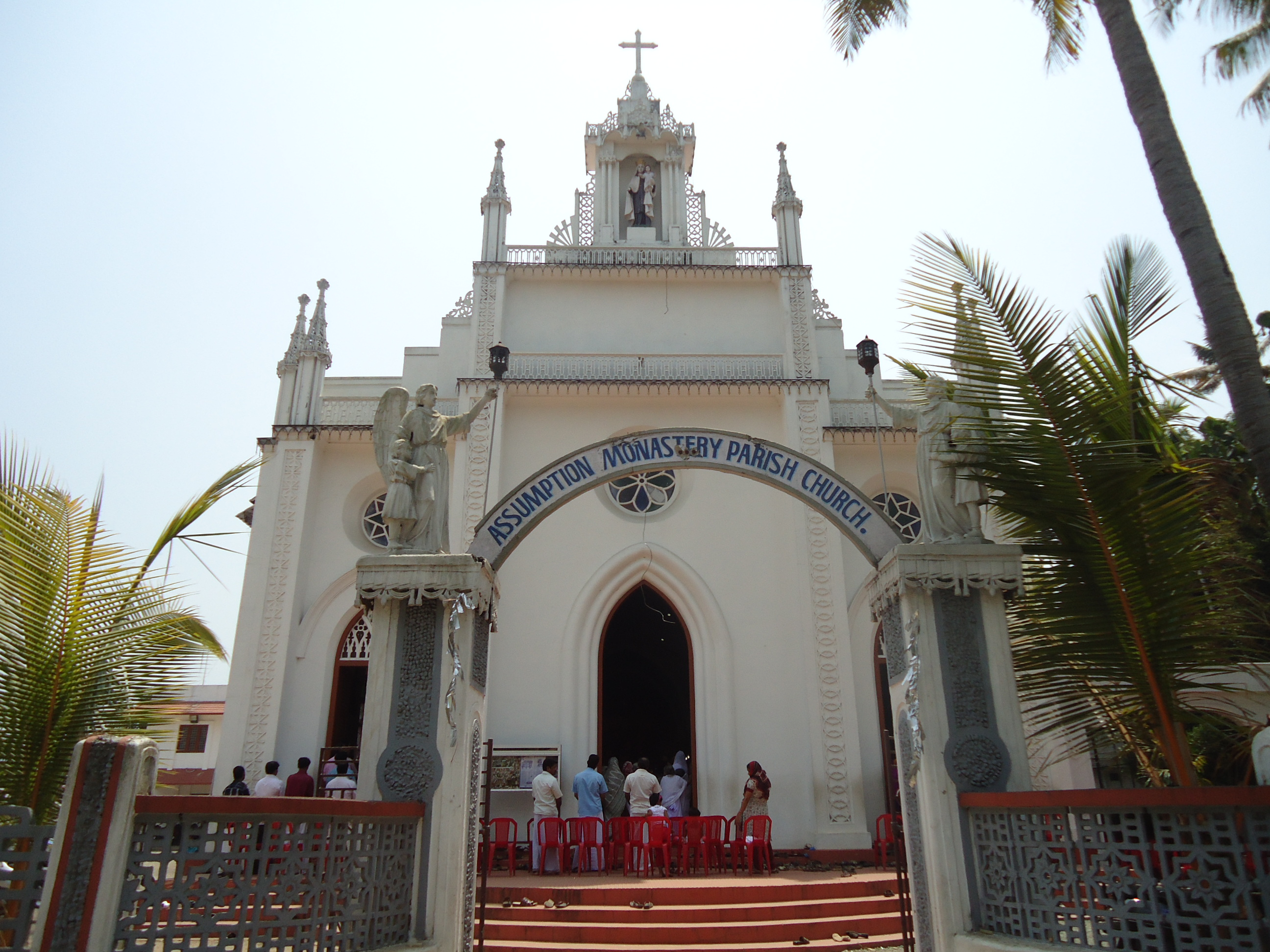

- Location in Kerala, India Naduvattam (India)
- Coordinates: 10°11′57″N 76°28′7″E
- Country: India
- State: Kerala
- District: Ernakulam

Languages
  - Official: Malayalam, English
- Time zone: UTC+5:30 (IST)
- PIN: 683574
- Nearest city: Kalady
- Lok Sabha constituency: chalakudy

Naduvattam is a small village situated in Ernakulam district, Kerala state, south India. It is situated about 12 km from Angamaly and 5 km from Kalady.

== Location ==
Naduvattom is in the Malayattoor-Neeleeswaram grama panchayat. It is a stone's throw from Neeleeswaram junction which houses the Panchayat office. It can also be approached from Chandrapura junction for those coming from Angamaly and Northern Kerala. Naduvattom is en route to the St. Thomas Shrine in Malayattoor. A huge number of pilgrims visit the shrine mostly during Good Friday and the holy month. Naduvattom has the St. Antony's Church in the name of Saint Anthony of Padua which also houses a parish hall for organizing cultural activities. The Naduvattom church had celebrated its platinum jubilee in 2013. Sahrdaya club and Angel Club are the major recreation centres. The All-Kerala Badminton Open Tournament is conducted by Sahrdaya club annually in January. Onam activities like tug of war and indoor games like chess and carrom are organized under the club every year.
