= Kalady =

- Small town in Kochi
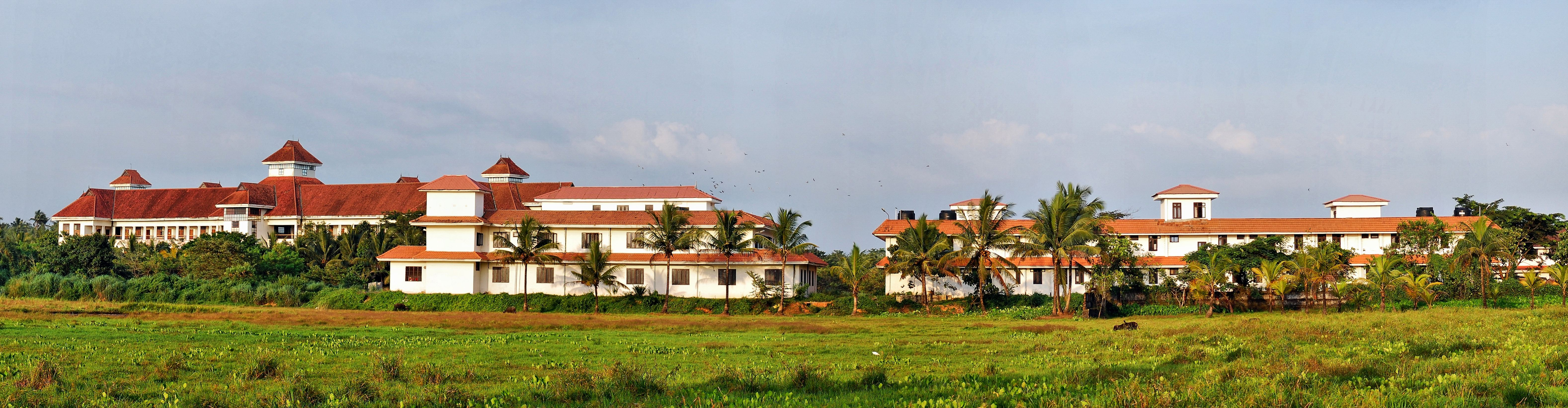
- Kalady university

- Location in Kerala, India Kalady (India)
- Coordinates: 10.1661°N 76.4389°E
- Country: India
- State: Kerala
- District: Ernakulam
- City UA: Kochi
- Established: 1956

Government
  - Type: Kalady Grama Panchayath
  - Body: UDF

Area
  - Total: 16.44 km^{2} (6.35 sq mi)

Population (2001 Census)
  - Total: 24,707
  - Density: 1,503/km^{2} (3,890/sq mi)

Languages
  - Official: Malayalam, English
- Time zone: UTC+5:30 (IST)
- Postal code: 683574
- Vehicle registration: KL 40, KL 63

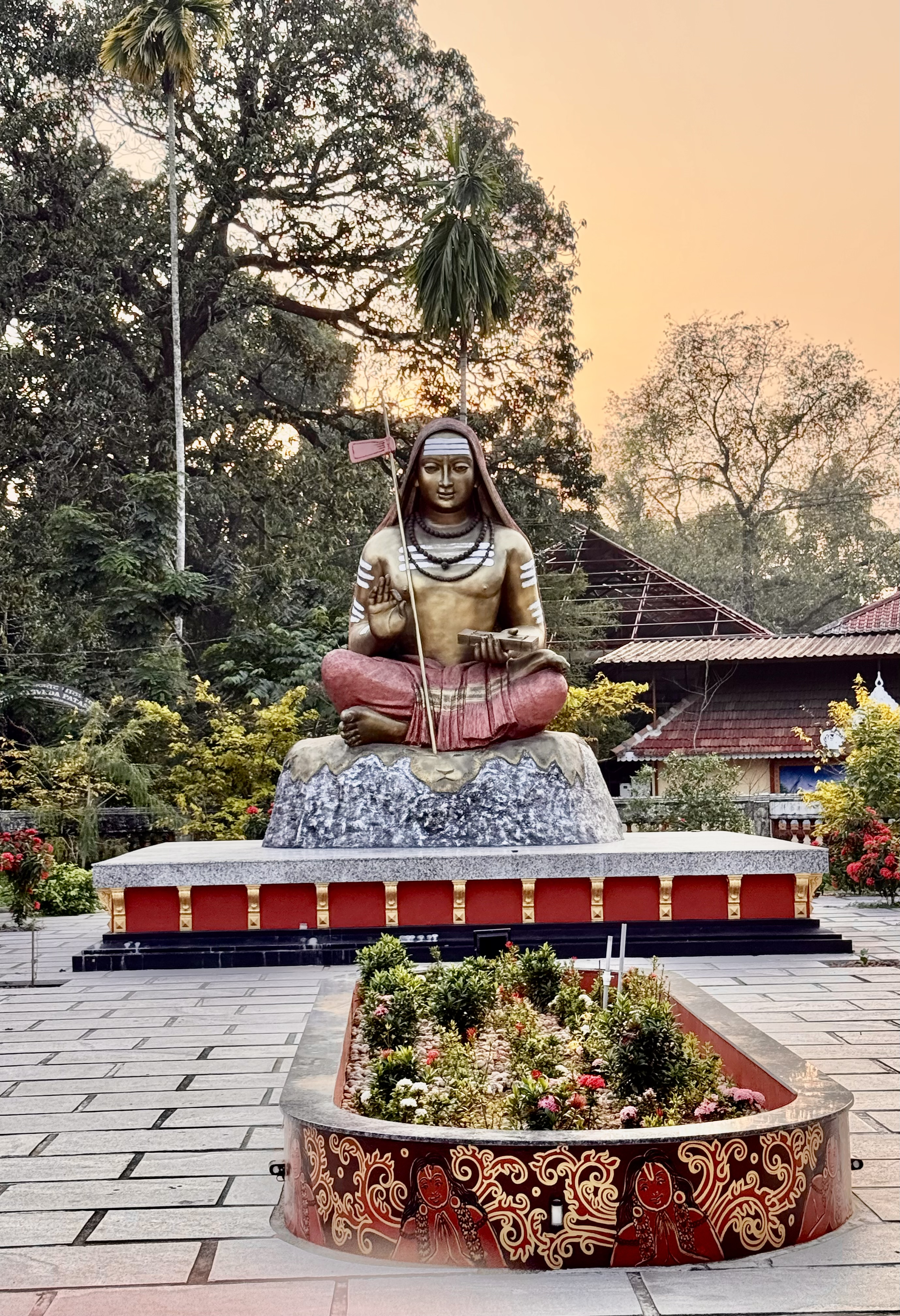
Statue of Adi Shankaracharya at Kalady

Kalady or Kaladi is a village located between Angamaly and Perumbavoor, east of the Periyar River, near Malayattoor in Ernakulam district of Kerala, India. The town is not far from Cochin International Airport. It is notable as the birthplace of 9th century Indian philosopher Adi Shankara.

== History ==
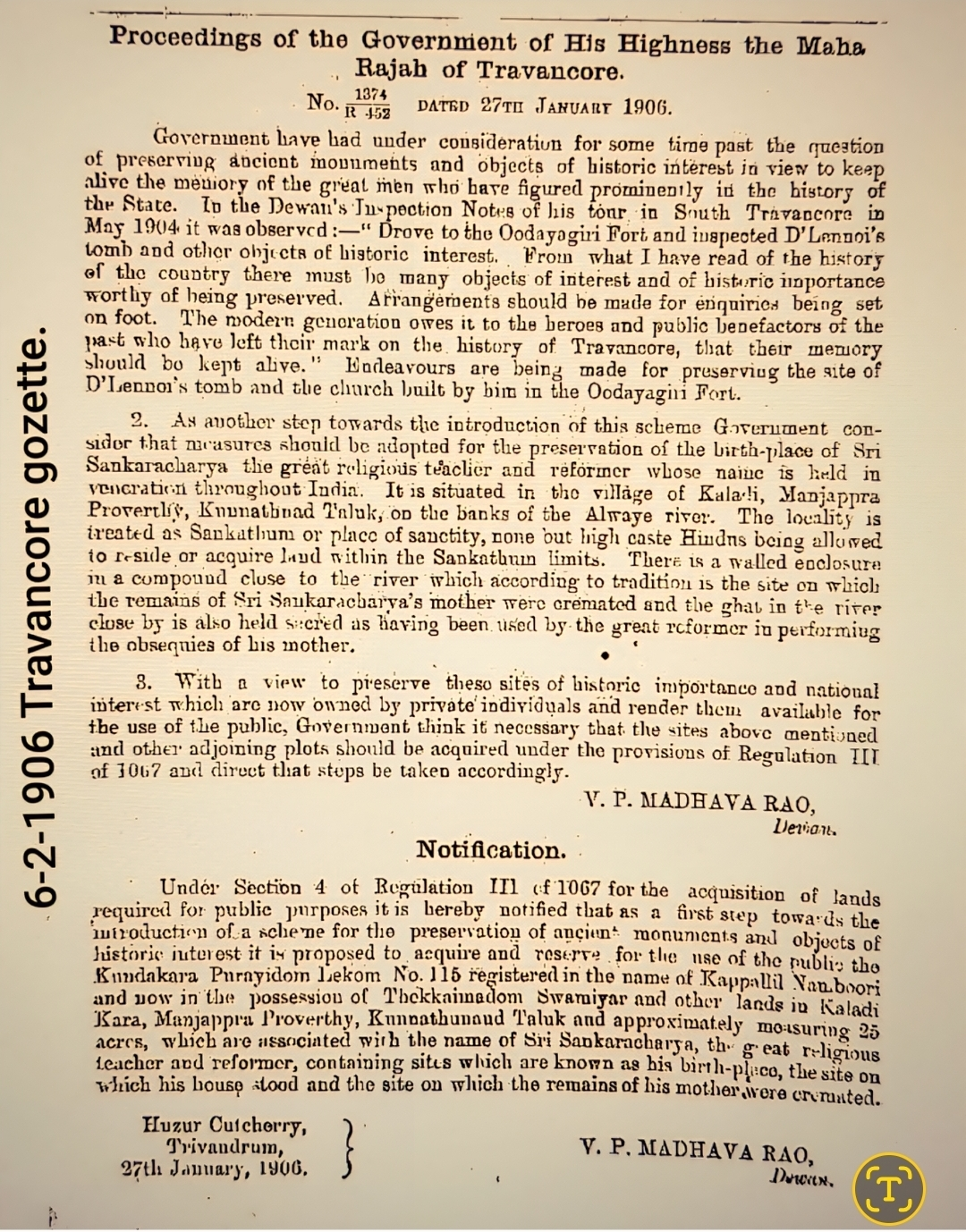
Official Gazetteer of Acquisition of properties from Kappilly paternal house of Shankara Acharya

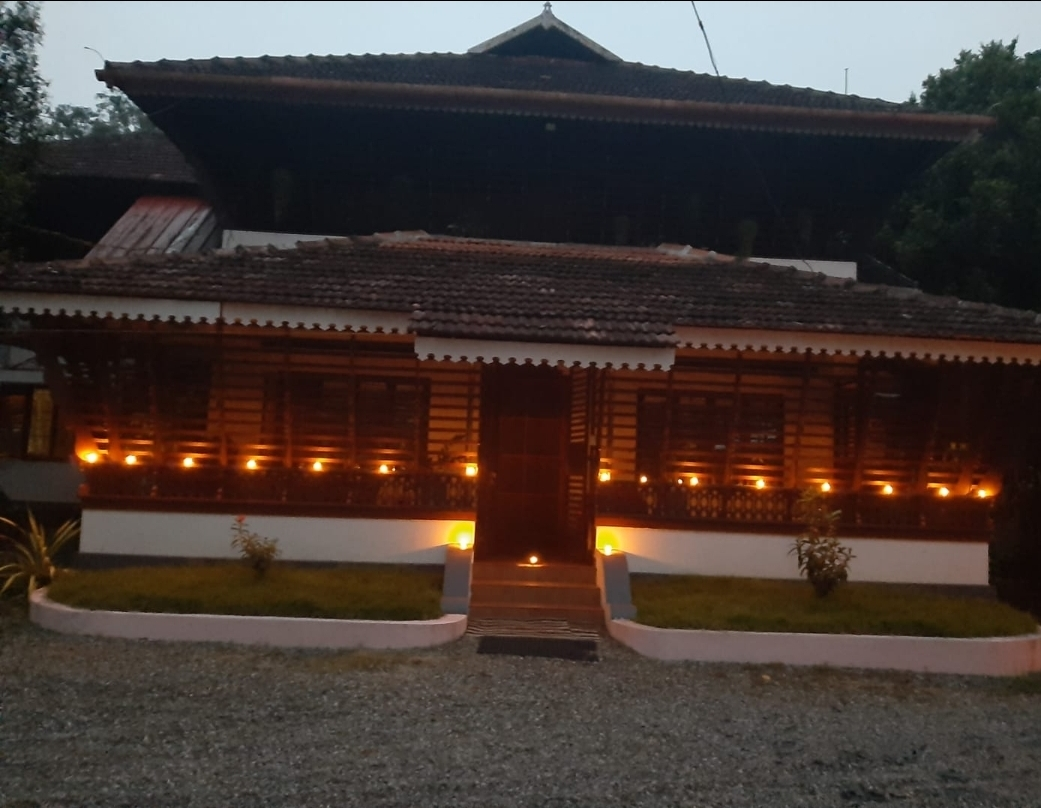
Kappilly mana -the paternal house of Adi Shankara

Kalady was under Thekkemadom kingship, a kerala based Shankara Acharya mutt. In 1906 properties of paternal house of Sree Shankaracharya Kappilly was acquired by Proceedings of the Government of Travancore by Maharaja of Travancore by Diwan Madhav Rao Gazette 1374 R452 dated 27th Jan 1906[PuraRekha Department Kerala]. This acquisition was along with the burial ground of Aryamba mother of Shankaracharya maintained till acquisition with daily lamp of respects by family of Shankara Acharya Kappilly, on a black lamp post well inscribed 'Thekke Madom Vaka' in Malayalam script.

The centenary of Kalady was celebrated in May 2010, and the story of its re-discovery a hundred years ago has been documented in a film by Sringeri Sharada Peetham.

== Etymology ==
In Malayalam, Kalady means "footprint". The village was previously called Sasalam. All traditional and hagiographical sources maintain that Kalady was Shankara's birthplace. It is situated on the banks of river Periyar. Kalady is believed to have been found by a chieftain named Rajasekara, whose dream was influenced by Hindu god Shiva. He also built a temple for Shiva at this place and made a settlement for Brahmins. There are two temples within Kalady - one for Saradamba and other for Shankara as Dakshinamurthi. Sringeri Mutt and Kanchi Mutt have their branches here. A 45 m (148 ft) tall Adi Sankara Kirti Stamba Mandapa was built by Kanchi Mutt under the aegis of its pontiff Chandrasekarendra Saraswati. A Sanskrit University is run by Sringeri Mutt within its grounds.

== Places of interest ==
=== Temples and monasteries ===
==== Shankara Temple ====
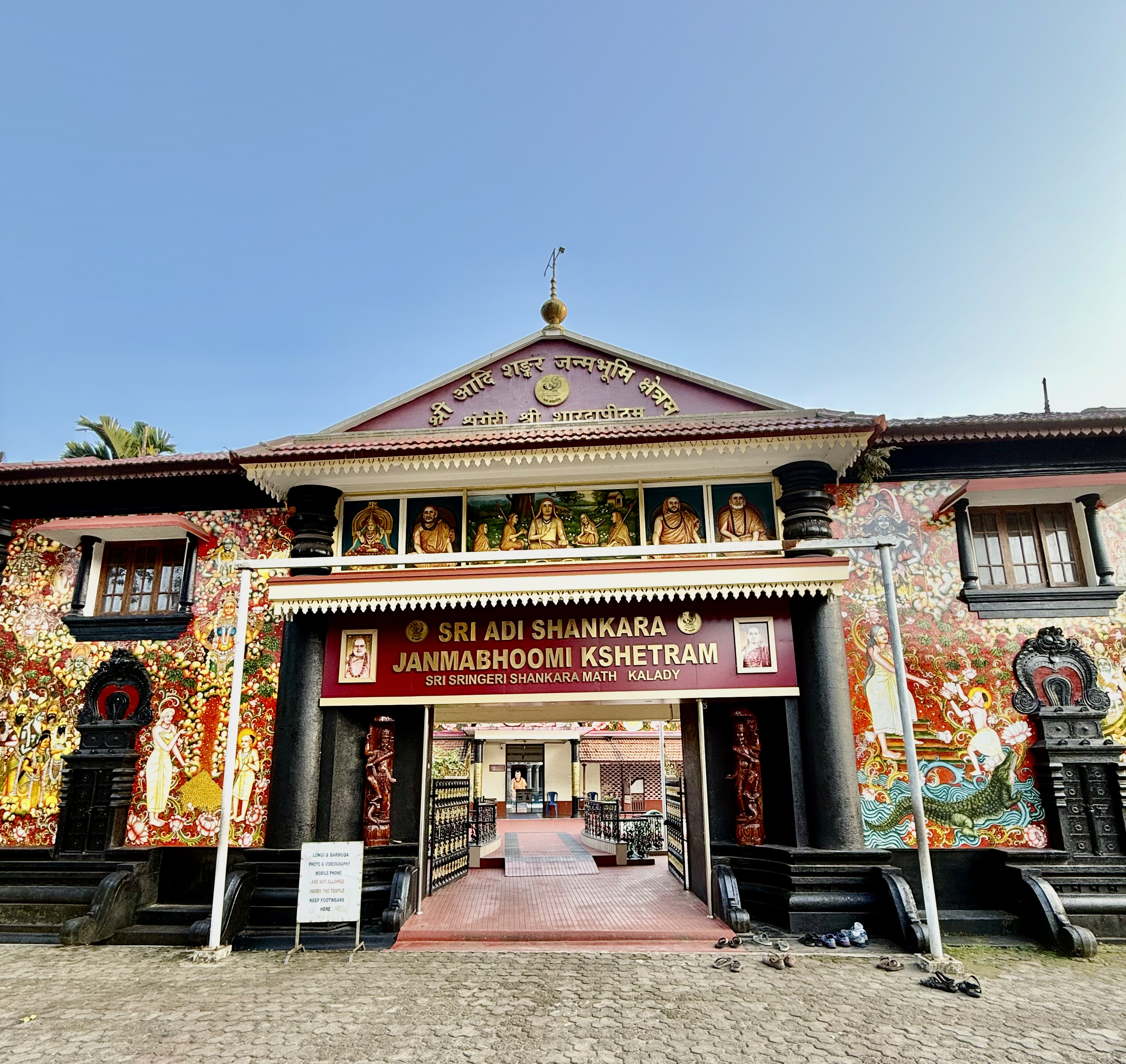
Sri Adi Shankara Janmabhoomi Kshetram in Kalady

The Shankara Shrine in Kalady, run by the Sringeri Mutt, is a large, partly open structure situated on the northern bank of the river Periyar. There are two major shrines in the temple; one is dedicated to Shankara and the other to Goddess Saradamba, the main deity of Sringeri. The samadhi (place of death) of Shankara's mother is also located here. A small shrine to Vinayaka is the scene of evening prayers, chanted to the rhythmic ringing of cymbals. The worship in these temples is done by Tamil or Kannada Smartha Brahmins and not by Namboothiris.

==== Ramakrishna Advaita Ashram ====
Sree Ramakrishna Advaita Ashram, Kalady

The Ramakrishna Advaita Ashram is a branch centre of Ramakrishna Math, headquartered at Belur, West Bengal. It is located very near the accepted birthplace of Shankara. It has a spacious prayer hall and a shrine modeled on the Sri Ramakrishna temple at Belur Math. The Ashram also runs a school (Brahmanandodayam), a charitable dispensary, and a library.

==== Sri Adi Sankara Keerthi Sthamba Mandapam ====
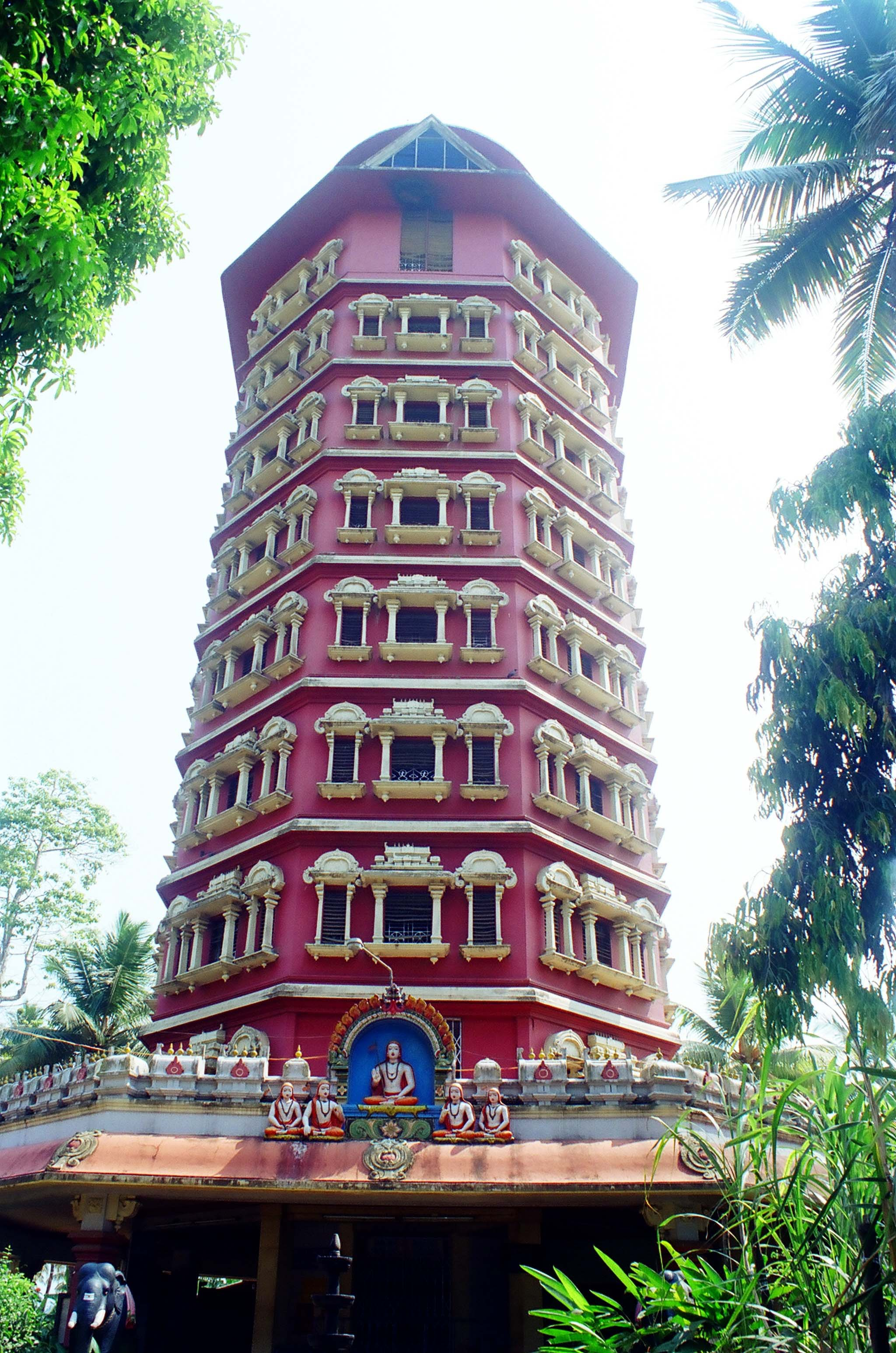
Adi Sankara Keerthi Sthambha Mandapam

Sri Adi Sankara Keerthi Sthamba Mandapam is an eight-story memorial built by Kanchi Kamakoti Math. The entrance to the memorial, guarded by two elephant statues, leads to the Paduka Mandapam. Two silver knobs represent the padukas, or wooden sandals of the Teacher. The walls of the memorial feature framed relief paintings that tell the story of Adi Shankaracharya. It also depicts the Ṣanmatam promulgated by Śankarachārya comprising Śaivam, Vaiśnavam, Śāktam, Gānapatyam, Souram and Kaumāram. These are the major cults in Hinduism which reinstated the Vedic path. The famous Shankara Stupa has eight sides. Adi Shankara's shrines in Kalady are open to all pilgrims irrespective of religion and caste. Visitors can review the life of Shankaracharya as they climb to the top.

==== Sri Krishna Temple ====
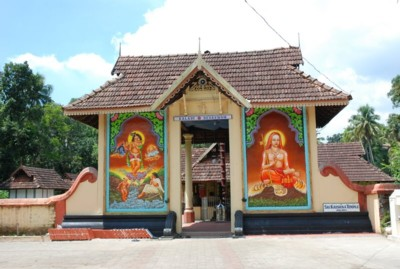
Sree Krishna Temple, Kalady

To the west of the Sringeri Math temple complex is a temple dedicated to Krishna. This temple is known as the ancestral deity of Shankaracharya. It is mentioned as the kuladevata (ancestral deity) in verse 243 of Shankara's Prabodha Sudhakaram. The temple is under Kalady Devasthanam, in trusteeship of two Namboothiri families who had close associations with the life of Shankara. It is also the only surviving structure from the time of Shankara. The worship in this temple is also conducted by Namboothiris, unlike in the Shankaracharya temple. The important event in this temple is Kanakadhara Yanjam. Sree Sankara during pendency of upanayanam went begging for alms around and reached door steps of a poor widowed lady who had nothing but a dried amla to offer. Moved by the condition of that lady and her broad mind to offer whatever is available to bala Bhikshu, Sankara instantly recited Kanakadhara stotram. The golden gooseberry rain fell in the garden of that old lady and the house got to be known as Swarnathu mana (Originally known as Punnorkkott Mana). The ancestral deity temple of Sree Sankaracharya long back has started a Yagna during Sankara Jayanti season chanting Kanakadhara stotram by 32 Brahmins representing 32 years of life of that great guru.

==== Manickamangalam Karthyayani Temple ====
One kilometre north of Kalady is the Manickamangalam temple, dedicated to Bhagavathi, or the goddess Durga. Shankara's father Sivaguru was the priest in this temple.

==== Mattoor Thiru Vellaman Thulli Siva Temple ====
Vellamanthulli temple is two kilometres west of Kalady.

==== Nayathodu Sankara Narayana Temple ====
Nayathodu Sankara Narayana Temple, 3 km west of Kalady, is an example of Advaita in worship by Shankaracharya. According to legend, once Shankara prayed to Vishnu in this Shiva temple, Vishnu also came to reside in same idol. To this day, after offerings are made to Shiva, everything is removed and offerings are made to the same idol for Vishnu.

==== Manjapra Karppilli Kavu Siva Temple ====
Sivasarman Nambudiri, Shankaracharya's father, was the priest of Karpillykavu Shiva temple, just 8 km south at Manjapra.

==== Thekke Madam ====
Thekke Madam is just adjacent to Krishna Temple. It was founded by the Trichur Shankaracharya.

As a homage to Shankara, this Trichur Math was given special archana rights at Krishna Temple, the temple of the Shankara's ancestral deity, in year 825. To facilitate this leasehold property (kana pattam), lands were provided by Kalady Devaswom. This Math was given kingship rights in Kalady in 1730, thus marking the area of Sankara Sanketham. This was the only Math of Shankaracharya tradition for centuries that respected Kalady and sanctified it.

In modern times, the area is leased by the Sringeri Math which also runs a Vedic school there.

==== Aryadevi Samadhi Mandapam ====
Aryadevi Samadhi Mandapam is dedicated to Aryadevi (Aryamba), Shankaracharya's mother, as the place of her cremation. Shankara performed the cremation of his mother after her death. He was assisted by two of the ten Namboothiri families of Kalady. One family, Kappilly Mana, honoured the location with daily lamps for centuries. It was noticing the daily lamp Nadukaveri Sreenivasa Sastrikal, special envoy of Sringeri Math, identified and accepted Kalady as Shankaracharya's birthplace in 1905. The Raja of Travancore acquired the whole area from Kappilly Mana in 1905 and handed it over to the Sringeri Math which now maintains the Mandap.

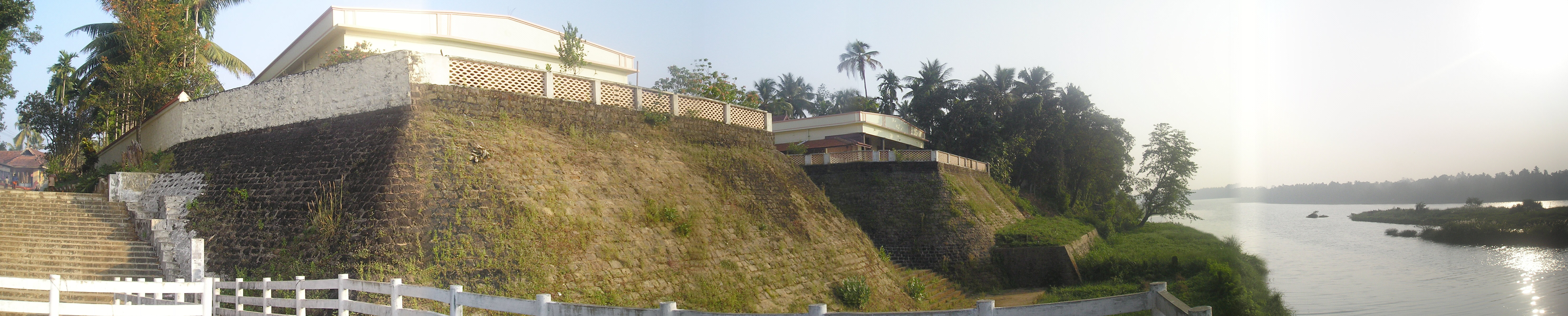
Panoramic view of the ghat

=== Ancient ghats ===
The three ghats below are adjacent, and span west to east in chronological order.

==== Kalady Kadavu (Aaraattu Kadavu) ====
The Kalady Kadavu is the place where the river took its turn, and where Kalady was born. It was also the place where Shankara had first performed Aaraattu (a river bath of an idol) for his ancestral deity before installing it at its current location. For centuries, during the festival at Sree Krishna Temple, the Aarattu has been carried out at this ghat.

==== Crocodile Ghat ====
The "Muthala Kadavu," or Crocodile Ghat, is where Shankara's life turned to sannyasa (ascetic life).

His mother Aryamba did not agree with his desire to become a sannyasin. Legend says that one day, Shankara was touched by a dog and, as per custom followed by the community, Shankara had to take bath. Accompanied by mother, Shankara went to river Poorna to bathe. While in the water, a crocodile caught hold of his leg. The drowning boy told his mother that the crocodile would leave him alone if she would allow him to take up sannyasa. Helpless, his mother agreed, and the crocodile freed Shankara.

==== Ghat of the post-funeral rites of Mother Aryamba ====
Here is the ghat where Shankara performed the Apara Kriyas (the rituals after death and cremation as per Nambudiri rituals) for his mother Aryamba. Today, the ghat is within the temple complex of Sree Sringeri Math.

== Festivals ==
Sankara Jayanti is celebrated for five days in April or May every year. The celebration includes several religious rites. Navaratri is celebrated for nine days during September or October with music, the chariot festival, rathostavam, and other festivities.

The annual festival of the Lord of Kalady — Lord Krishna Thiru Kalady Appan — falls on 6 January. One distinct activity, the Aaraatu of Lord Krishna (the river bath), has been taking place for centuries in the holy ghat where Kalady was born. Every year during the Ṣankara Jayanti time (April–May), Kanakadhāra Yajñam is also being conducted with great participation of people even from far distance.

Kanjoor Thirunal is also a very popular festival in this area.

== Education ==
The following institutions of learning are located in this region:

- Adi Sankara Institute of Engineering and Technology
- Sree Sankara College
- Sree Sankaracharya University of Sanskrit

== Transport ==
Cochin International Airport is located 6 kilometres (3.7 miles) from Kalady. The nearest railway station the Angamaly railway station.

== See also ==
- Ramachandrapura Math
- Piravom
