= Snake bean =

Snake bean may refer to two different species of leguminous plants:

- Bobgunnia madagascariensis, a poisonous species found in Africa
- Vigna unguiculata subsp. sesquipedalis, a widely cultivated edible legume
