= Malayattoor pilgrimage =

Christian pilgrimage in India

The Malayattoor pilgrimage is an annual pilgrimage near the end of Lent to a hilltop Syro-Malabar Catholic church in Malayattoor in the South Indian state of Kerala. It is the largest Indian pilgrimage in honor of Thomas the Apostle, for whom the church is named and who reputedly founded it himself in the first century CE. Pilgrims walk three kilometers uphill to the church, sometimes while carrying heavy wooden crosses.

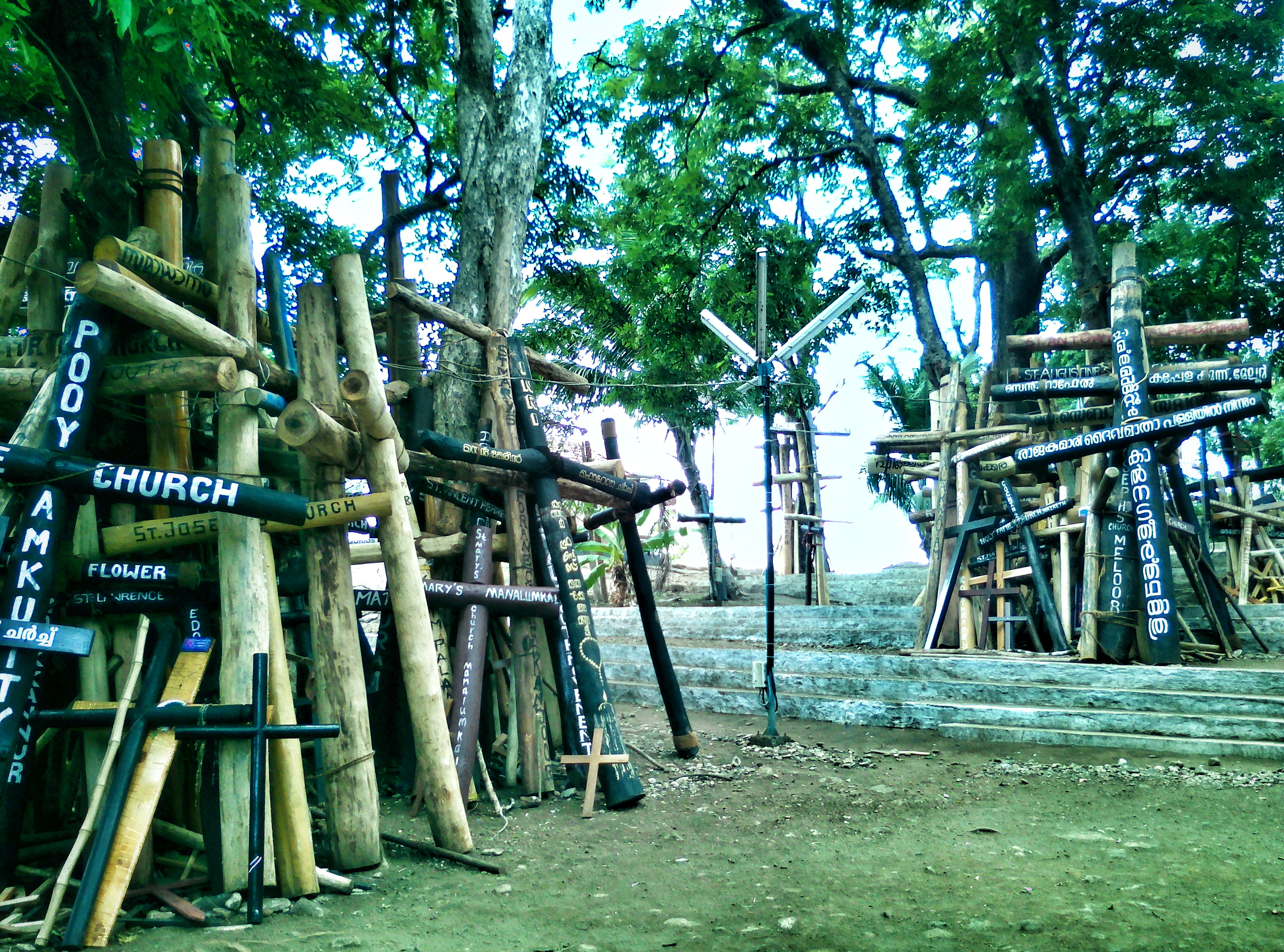
Wooden crosses from the pilgrimage

== Gallery ==
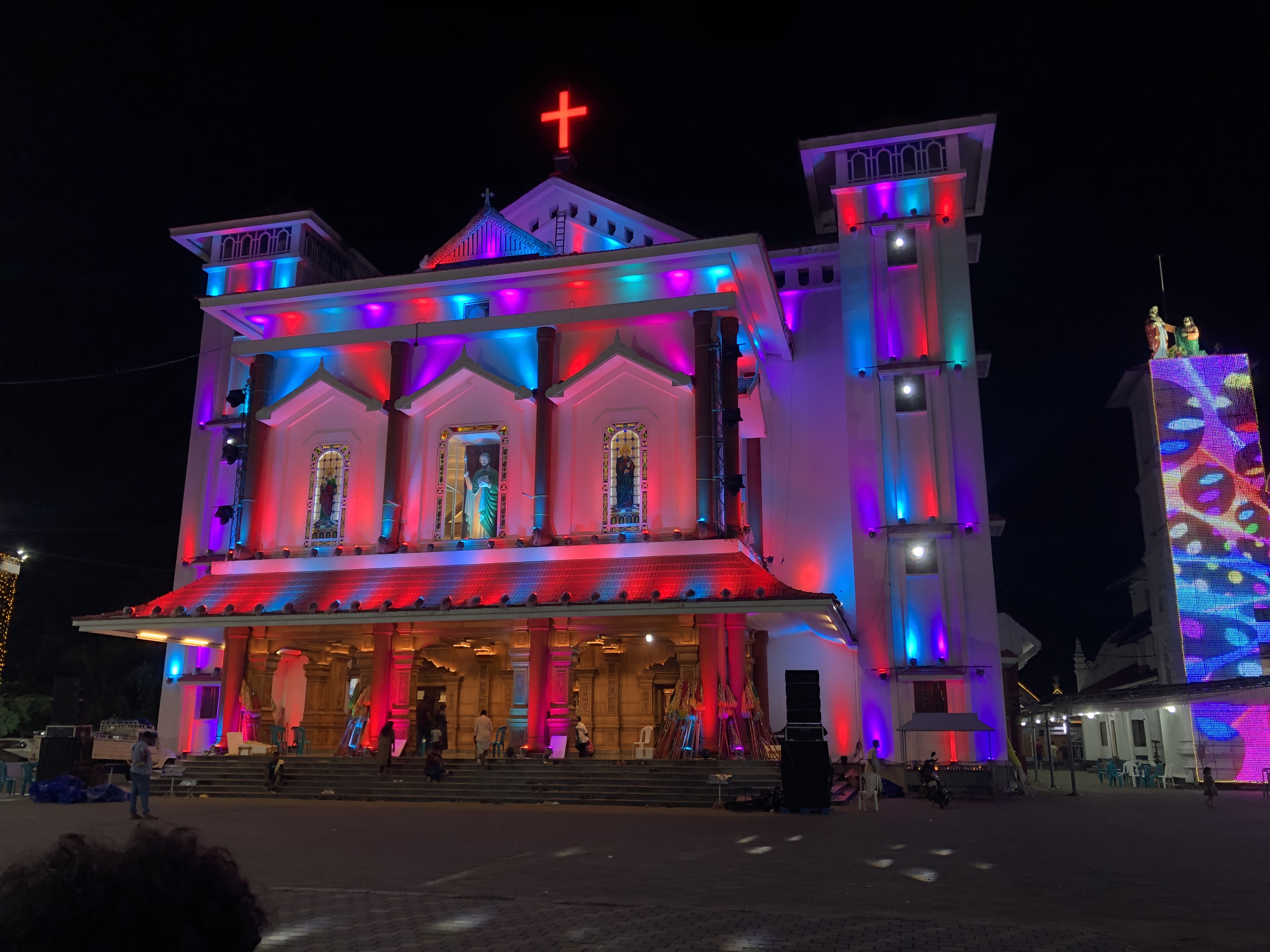
St. Thomas Syro-Malabar Pilgrim Church, situated 2 kms away from Malayattoor Pilgrim.
