= Angamaly railway station =

Railway station in Kerala, India

Angamaly for Kaladi
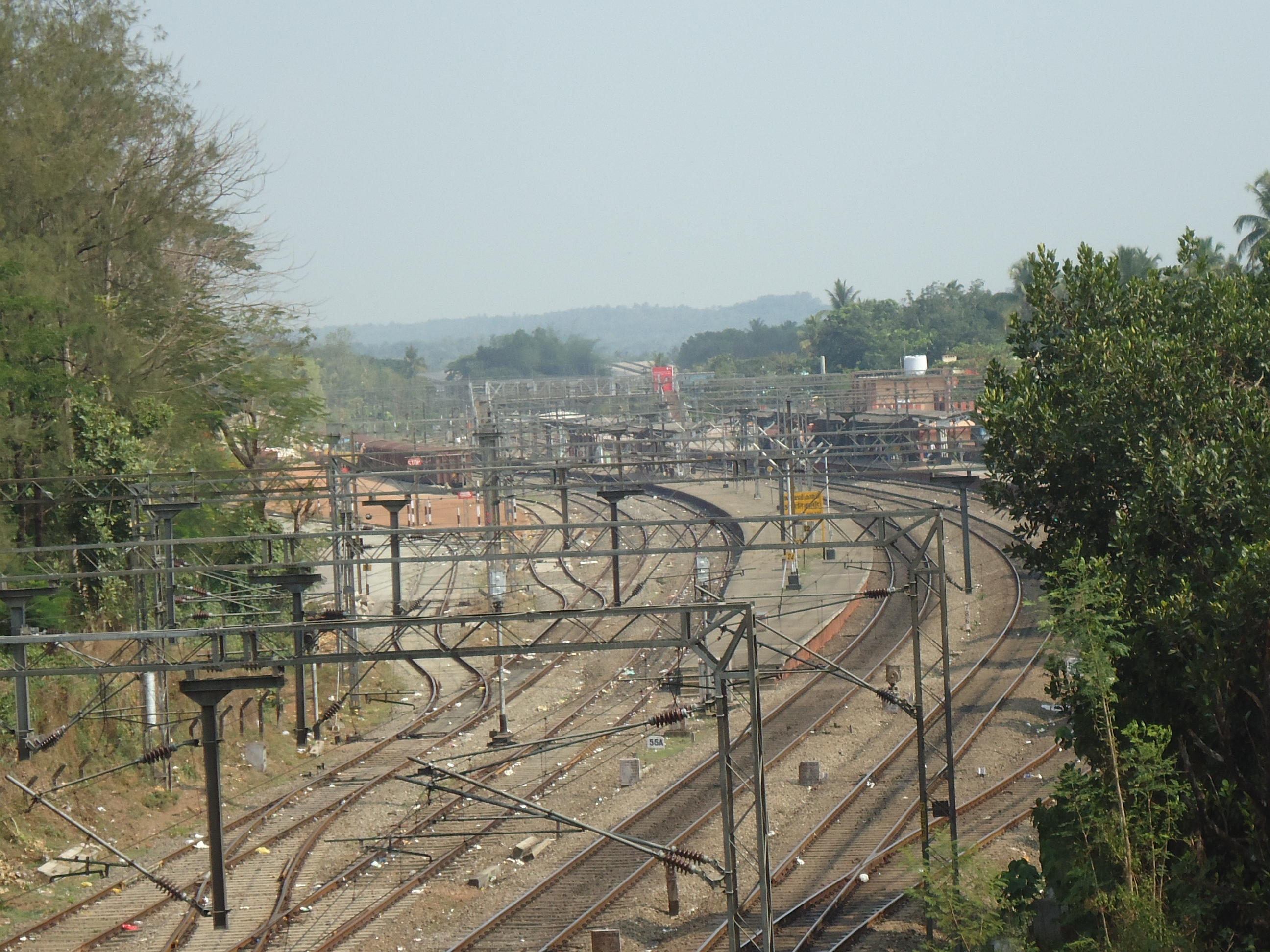
- Angamaly railway station site

General information
- Location: Angamaly South, Angamaly, Kerala 683572
- Coordinates: 10.1839°N 76.3779°E
- System: Indian Railways station
- Owner: Indian Railways
- Platforms: 3
- Tracks: 6

Construction
- Structure type: Standard on-ground station
- Parking: Yes
- Cycle facilities: Yes

Other information
- Station code: AFK
- Fare zone: Southern Railway

History
- Rebuilt: Yes

Passengers
- 10000 per day (includes up and down passengers, may vary)

Services
Preceding station	Indian Railways	Following station
Karukutty towards Shoranur Junction	Southern Railway zone Shoranur–Cochin Harbour section	Chovvara towards Cochin Harbour Terminus
Route map
Location

Angamaly for Kalady (station code: AFK) is an NSG–4 category Amruth Bharat Railway Station Amrit Bharat Station Scheme Indian railway station in Thiruvananthapuram railway division of Southern Railway zone. It is a railway station Located at Angamaly (major suburb of Kochi City) in Ernakulam district of Kerala state in India operated by Southern Railway Network. It lies in the Shoranur–Cochin Harbour section of Trivandrum division. Angamaly is the halting point for 48 trains including Express and all Passenger trains passing through this station. The railway station is located about 26 km from Ernakulam Town and 10 km from Aluva stations. It Is the nearest railway station of Cochin International Airport, 5 km apart, where above 10 million passengers travel every year.

This railway station has a Full Rake facility of Goods Yard and FCI private sidings railway line and TELK private siding railway line.

Angamaly ranked 28 out of 104 for earnings during 2016–17 fiscal year.

The proposed rail line to Sabarimala is starting from here. The proposed line starts from Angamaly in Ernakulam district and ends at Erumelli, one of the major Ayyappa pilgrims base camp centre, at Kottayam district. The centre has allocated a total outlay of Rs 923 crore to the state for various railway projects for the year 2018–19. The new projects announced are the Rs 1518-crore doubling in the Thiruvananthapuram–Kanyakumari section and a third line in the 107-km-long Ernakulam–Shornur congested sector. The estimated cost of the project when it was conceived years ago was Rs 517 crore. But due to delay in implementation, the cost had escalated to Rs 1,566 crore now.

As of November 2025, the estimated project cost is slated to be Rs. 3,810 crore.

== Layout ==
Angamaly railway station has 3 platforms to handle long-distance and Passenger trains and 2 platforms to handle cargo. There is one entrance at present. 1 Foot overbridge, cooled drinking water facility available, Parking facility for vehicles available in railway compound and private pay and park facilities are available. 24 hour auto taxi facility available. Lot of nearby star hotel rooms available within a vicinity of 200meters. Private Bustand located near the railway station. KSRTC buses available in front of the railway station. KSRTC main depot located 2 km away from this railway station. Railway sanctioned lift facility at 1, 2 and 3rd platforms and its implementation has not started yet. one SBI ATM facility in front of the station itself and a Federal Bank ATM facility located at 100meters away from the main entrance. One full rake Goods Yard and 2 private railway sidings for FCI & TELK.

== Revenue ==
Angamaly railway station is an average revenue station for Thiruvananthapuram rail division.Annual passenger earnings details of railway stations in Kerala In the financial year 2016–17 it earned 7cr rupees, with 21 lakh passengers per year using the service.

== Nearby places ==
- Cochin International Airport – (4.42 km)
- GIFT CITY KOCHI ANGAMALY - (13.5 km)
- Sree Sarada Military School Kalady (7 km)
- Sree Sankaracharya University of Sanskrit(7 km)
- Food Corporation of India Angamaly (1 km)
- Central MSME Technology centre Govt of India Angamaly (1.5 km)
- KSIDC Business Park Angamaly (1.5 km)
- INKEL Business Park Angamaly (1.5 km)
- Transformers and Electricals Kerala Limited (1 km)
- ESI Dispensary Angamaly (2 km)
- Government Thaluk Hospital Angamaly (2 km)
- KSRTC Angamaly Bustand (2 km)
- Little Flower Hospital and Research Centre Angamaly (2 km)
- Sri Sringeri Shankara Math Sri Adi Shankara Janmabhoomi Kshethram, Kalady (9 km)
- Sri Adi Sankara Keerthi Sthamba Mandapam – (7.4 km)
- Sri Ramakrishna Advaita Ashram (8.3 km)
- Sree Sankaracharya College of arts and science (7 km)
- Adi Sankara Training College (7 km)
- Adi Sankaracharya institute of Science and technology Kalady (7 km)
- Federal Institute of Science and technology Hormis Nagar Angamaly (9 km)
- SCMS school of Engineering and technology (12 km)
- DePaul Institute of Science and technology Angamaly (1 km)
- Bamboo Corporation of Kerala (1 km)
- Thirumoozhikkulam Lakshmana Perumal Temple (9 km)
- Plantation corporation Ayyampuzha (22 km)
- Ezhattumugam Dam Prakrithi Gramam and Hanging Bridge (20 km)
- Athirapilly water falls (35 km)
- Dreamworld Water Park (34 km)
- Silver Storm Water Theme Park (36 km)
- Wonderla Kochi (30 km)
- Thattekad Bird Sanctuary (45 km)
- Cherai Beach (27.4 km)
- Malayattoor Church (16 km)
- The Village, Mangattukara, Angamaly (3 km)

== Trains passing through Angamaly railway station ==
No.	Train no.	Train name	Arrival days	Schedule
1.	16629	Malabar Express	Daily	00:29
2.	16347	Mangaluru Central Express	Daily	02:29
3.	16630	Malabar Express	Daily	02:49
4.	16381	Kanniyakumari Jayanti Janata	Daily	03:42
5.	16127	Guruvayur Express	Daily	04:14
6.	16341	Thiruvananthapuram Intercity	Daily	04:21
7.	16187	Karaikkal–Ernakulam (Tea Garden) Express	Daily	05:24
8.	12623	Chennai Central–Thiruvananthapuram Central Mail	Daily	06:00
9.	56361	Shoranur–Ernakulam Passenger	Daily	06:14
10.	16526	Kanniyakumari Island Express	Daily	06:44
11.	56370	Ernakulam–Guruvayur Passenger	Daily	06:52
12.	16328	Guruvayur–Madurai Express	Daily	07:12
13.	16305	Ernakulam–Kannur Intercity Express	Daily	07:19
14.	22639	Chennai Central–Alappuzha ( Alleppey ) SF Express	Daily	07:44
15.	56362	Kottayam–Nilambur Road Passenger (unreserved)	Daily	07:53
16.	56371	Guruvayur–Ernakulam Passenger (unreserved)	Daily	08:15
17.	16308	Kannur–Alappuzha Executive Express	Daily	10:40
18.	22646	Ahilya Nagari SF Express	Saturday	10:44
19.	12512	Thiruvananthapuram Central–Gorakhpur Rapti Sagar SF Express	Sun, Tue, Wed	10:44
20.	12522	Ernakulam–Barauni Rapti Sagar SF Express	Fri	10:44
21.	66611	Palakkad Jn–Ernakulam Jn MEMU	Sun, Mon, Wed, Thu, Fri, Sat	10:57
22.	22648	Thiruvananthapuram Central–Korba SF Express	Mon, Thu	11:04
23.	16302	Shornur Venad Express	Daily	11:04
24.	22645	Thiruvananthapuram Ahilya Nagari Express	Wed	11:44
25.	12511	Gorakhpur–Thiruvananthapuram Central Rapti Sagar SF Express	Sun, Thu, Fri	11:44
26.	12521	Barauni–Ernakulam Rapti Sagar SF Express	Thu	11:44
27.	16650	Mangalore Parasuram Express	Daily	11:44
28.	22647	Korba–Thiruvananthapuram Central SF Express	Mon, Fri	11:49
29.	16649	Thiruvananthapuram Parasuram Express	Daily	13:32
30.	16382	Kanniyakumari–Mumbai CSMT (Jayanti Janata) Express	Daily	14:08
31.	56375/	Guruvayur–Ernakulam Passenger (unreserved)	Daily	14:29
32.	66612	Ernakulam Jn.–Palakkad Jn. MEMU	Sun, Mon, Wed, Thu, Fri, Sat	15:59
33.	16301	Thiruvananthapuram Venad Express	Daily	15:54
34.	16307	Alappuzha–Kannur Executive Express	Daily	16:49
35.	22640	Alappuzha–Chennai Central (Alleppey) SF Express	Daily	17:59
36.	56364	Ernakulam Jn–Shoranur Jn Passenger (unreserved)	Daily	18:23
37.	16525	Bangalore Island Express	Daily	18:39
38.	56363	Nilambur Road–Kottayam Passenger (unreserved)	Daily	19:04
39.	16306	Kannur–Ernakulam Intercity Express	Daily	19:24
40.	12624	Thiruvananthapuram Central–Chennai Central Mail	Daily	19:59
41.	56376	Ernakulam–Guruvayur Passenger (unreserved)	Daily	20:37
42.	16342/	Thiruvananthapuram Central Guruvayur InterCity Express	Daily	22:19
43.	16188	Ernakulam–Karaikkal (Tea Garden) Express	Daily	22:29
44.	16128/	Guruvayur–Chennai Egmore Express	Daily	22:49
45.	16348	Mangaluru Central–Thiruvananthapuram Express	Daily	22:51
46.	16327	Madurai–Guruvayur Express	Daily	00:19
47.	16791	Thirunelveli -Palakkad Palaruvi Express	Daily	09:17
48.	16792	Palakkad -Thirunelveli Palaruvi Express	Daily	17:50

== See also ==
- Sabarimala Railway
