= Malayattoor =

- Village
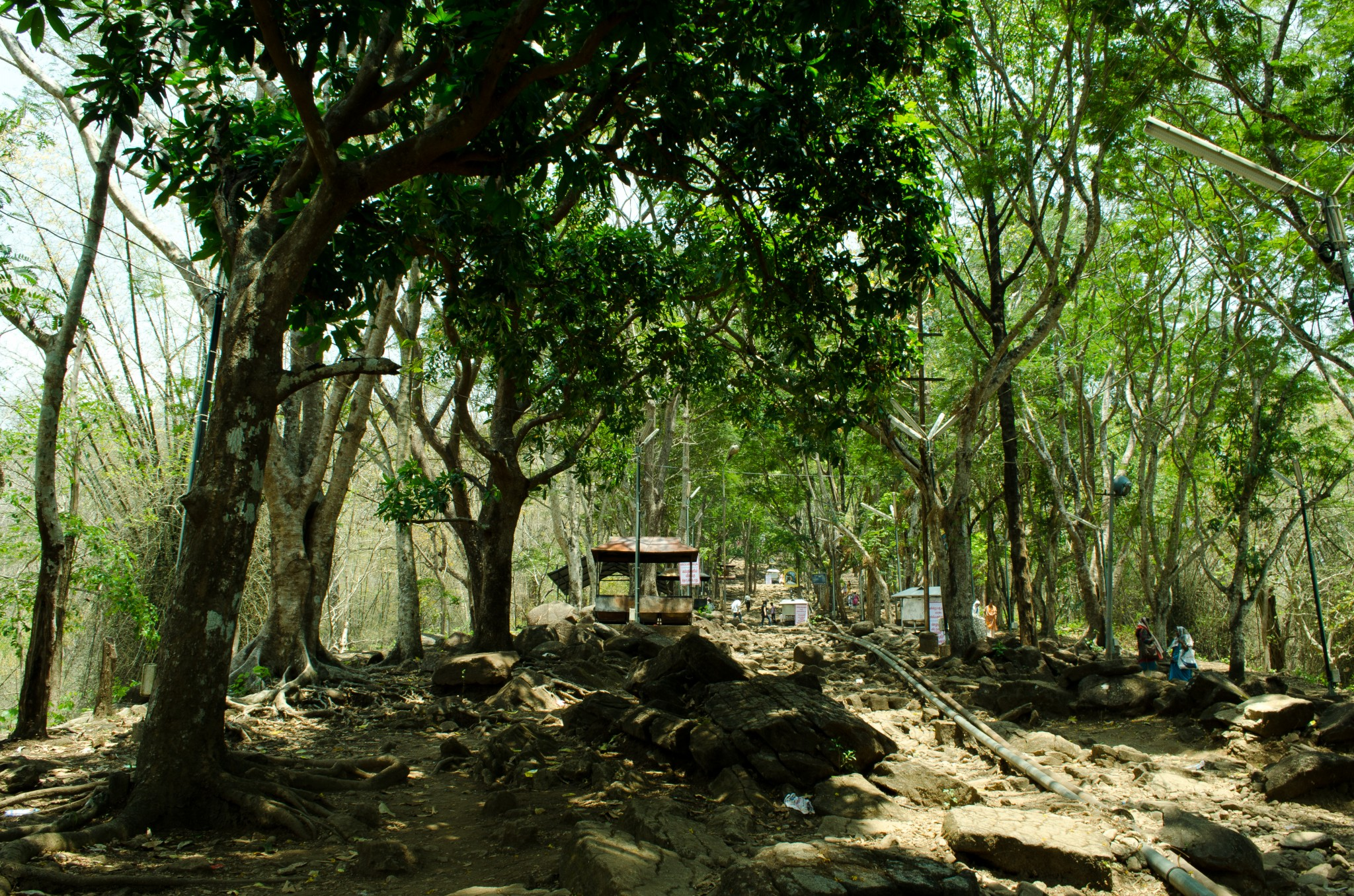
- Way to the Malayattoor hill top

- Location in Kerala, India Malayattoor (India)
- Coordinates: 10.20°N 76.50°E
- Country: India
- State: Kerala
- District: Ernakulam

Government
  - Body: Gram panchayat

Languages
  - Official: Malayalam, English
- Time zone: UTC+5:30 (IST)
- PIN: 683587
- Vehicle registration: KL -63 ANGAMALY
- Nearest town: Perumbavoor 12km Angamaly 13km
- Legislative Assembly constituency: Angamaly
- Lok Sabha constituency: Chalakudy
- Website: Official

Malayattoor is a village in Aluva taluk around 15 km (9 mi) northeast of Angamaly in Ernakulam District in the state of Kerala in South India. The name 'Malayattoor' is an amalgamation of the words mala (mountain), arr (river), and oore (place).

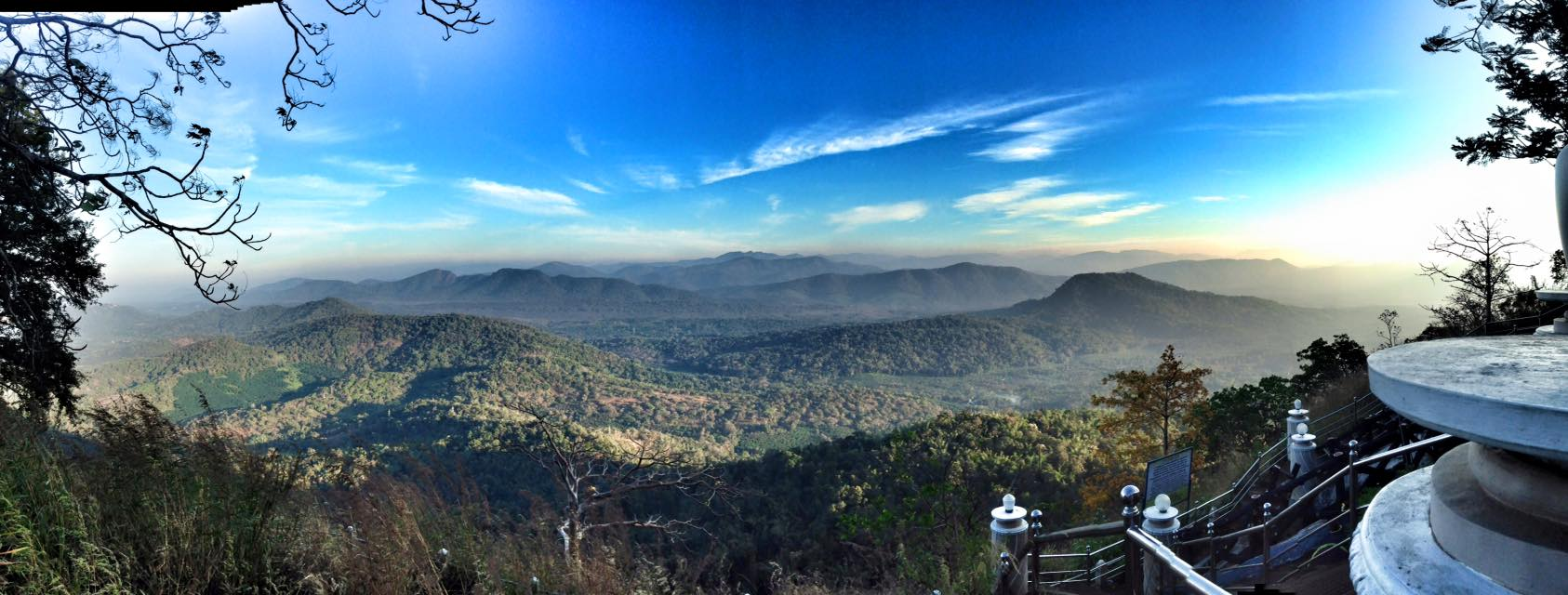

== Location ==
Located 40 km from Kochi, the Malayatoor Kurishumdy church is situated atop the 609 m high Kurishumudy. The church is dedicated to St. Thomas, who is believed to have prayed at this shrine. The church is situated at Kurisumudi, a hill in the Western Ghats girdled partially by the Periyar (river). The Church has a life-size statue of St. Thomas and the imprint of the feet of the Apostle on a rock. This shrine has been accorded an international pilgrimage station.

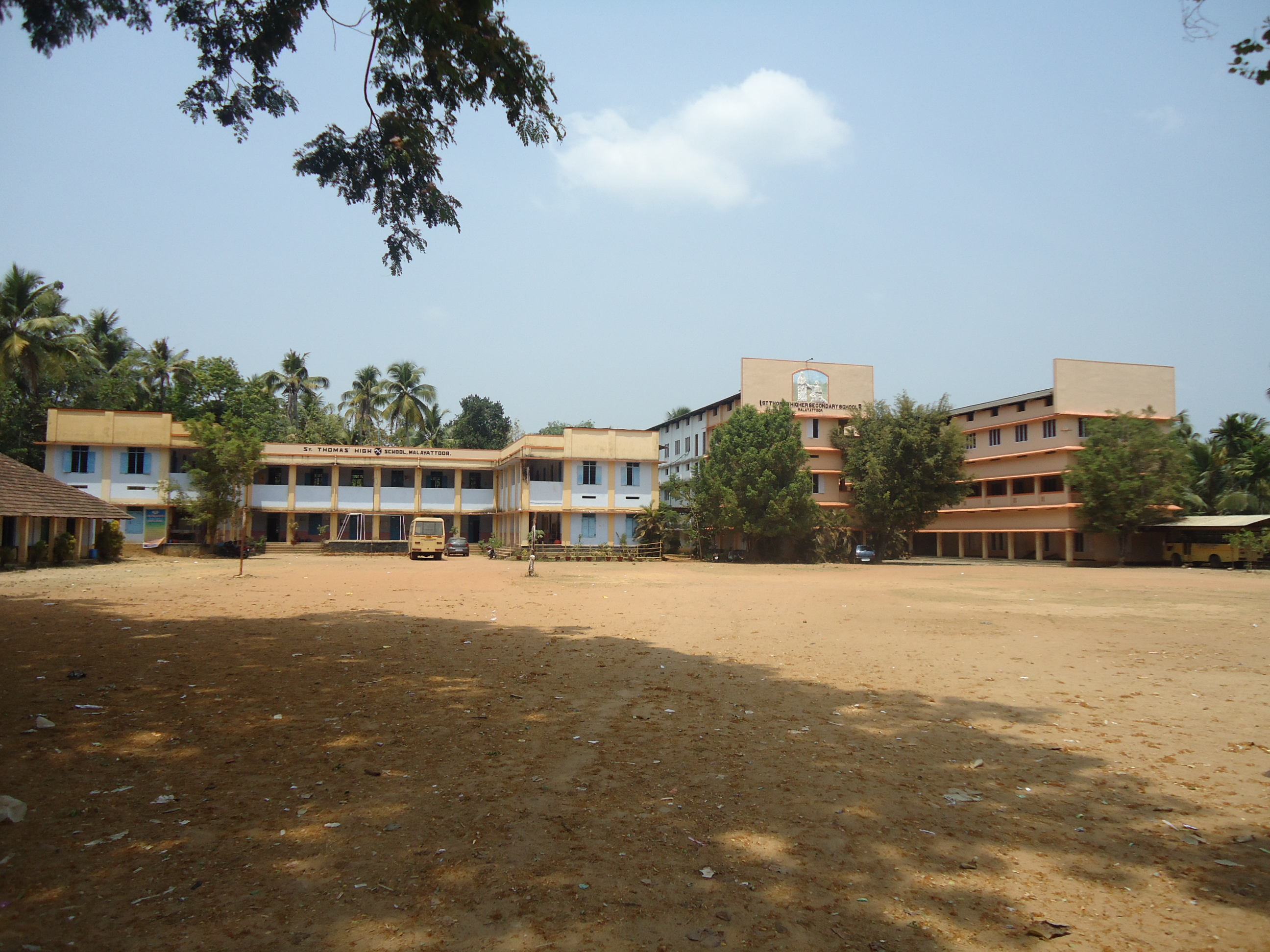
St Thomas High School Malayattoor

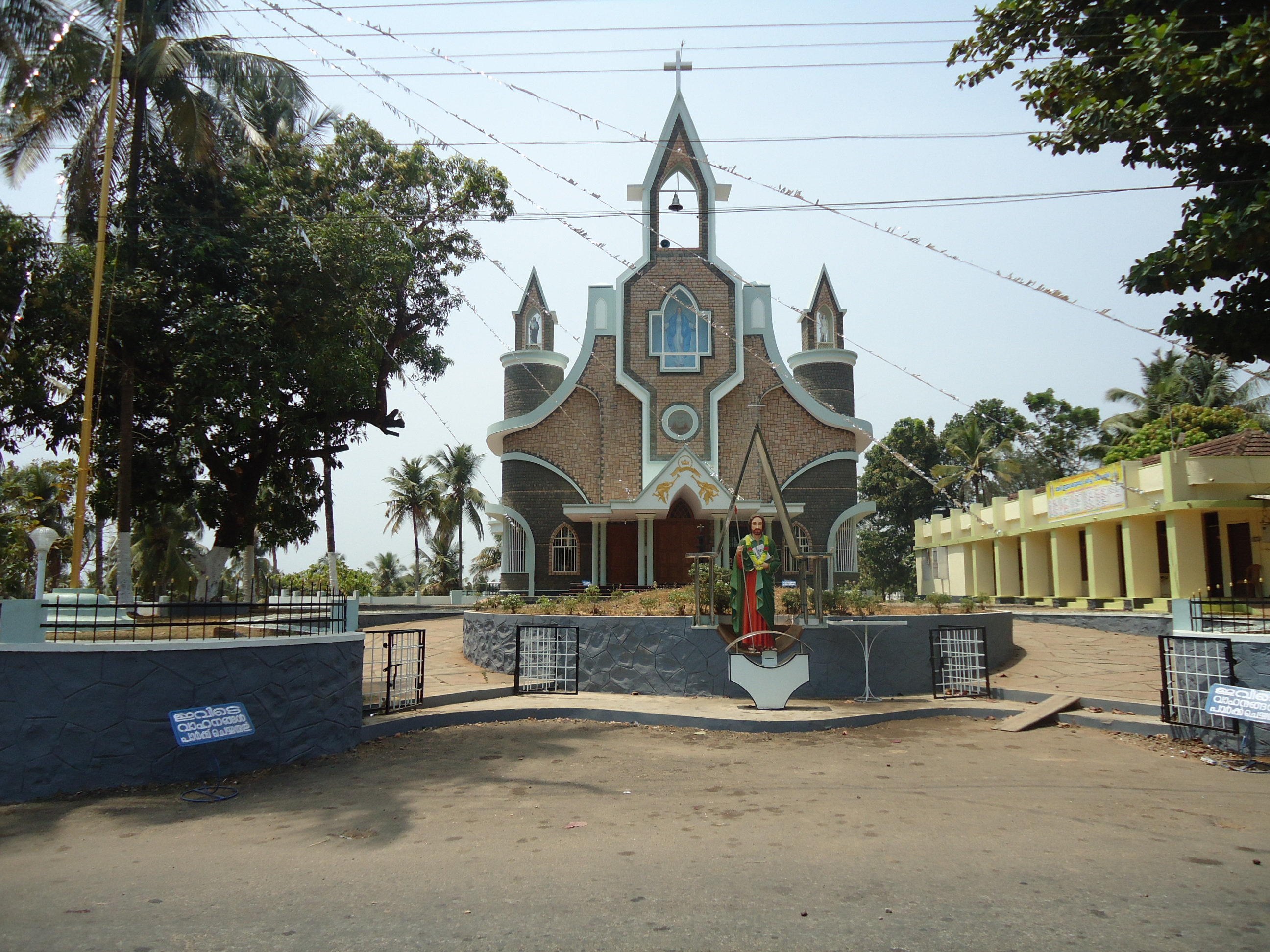
Mary Immaculate Church, Vimalagiri, Malayattoor

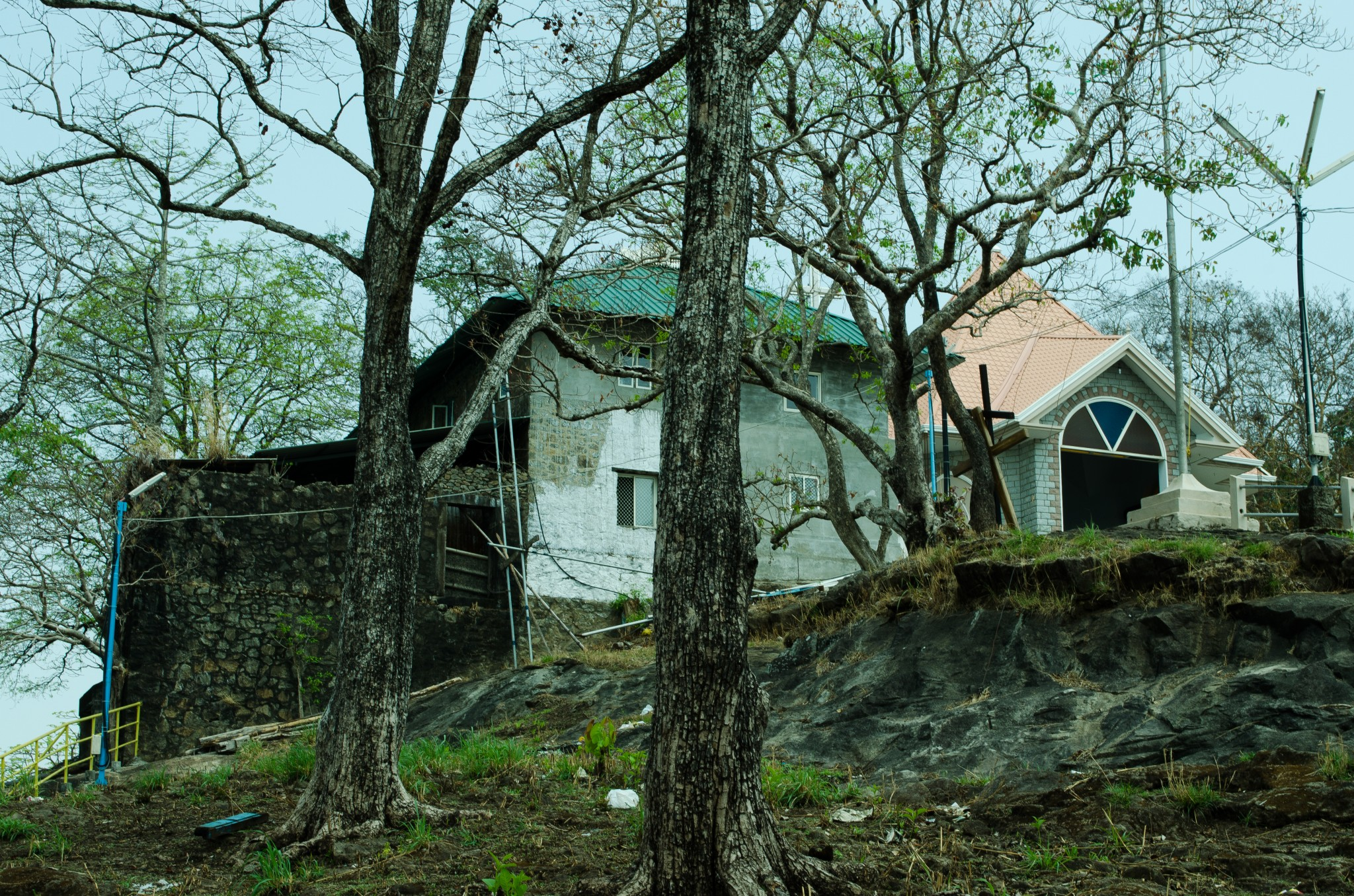
Church on the Malayattoor hill top

== Administration ==
Malayattoor is part of the Malayattoor-Neeleeswaram Panchayat (Local governing body) of Ernakulam district. .Malayattor is a part of Angamly Block .Malayattoor Forest Division, an important Forest Division under Central Forest Circle is headquartered here. The division was established in the year 1914, much before the Ernakulam District came into existence. The jurisdiction of this division covers the greater part of Ernakulam district including the urban-suburban area and adjoining forests unto boundary of Tamil Nadu.

== People ==
Most people follow Roman Catholic and Hindu beliefs. All the families are known by traditional family names.

- Christian
  - Syro-Malabar
- Malayattoor Ramakrishan(writer)

== Medical centres ==
St.Thomas Hospital Malayattoor.

Sparsham Medical Care. Vimalagiri

Jeevadhara Institute of Neuro Development And Research.

Ayush Prana Ayurveda Hospital & Research Center For Multiple Sclerosis.

Primary Health Center Illithodu.

Government Homeo Hospital Naduvattom.

== Education ==
1. St. Thomas HSS Malayattoor
2. St. Joseph Lp School malayattoor
3. SNDP HSS Neeleeswaram
4. St.Mary LP School
5. Govt. LP School Malayattoor
6. New Man Academy Vimalagiri
7. Tolins International School Malayattoor

== Industries ==
This region is in the foothills of the Western Ghats. Spices like nutmeg and crops like tapioca, snake beans, areca nuts are also planted. Also rubber plantations are plenty in number. These spices are then exported and foreign revenue is thus generated. Also various herbs are available in the forests which are used for making ayurvedic medicines. Bamboo corporation, crusher units are the major industries operating in this area. Heavy vehicles like tippers and lorries are a common sight.

== Movies shot in Malayattoor. ==
Malayattoor is a famous movie shooting location in South India.

Eeta

St. Thomas

Ulavuthurai

Bhalevadivi Basu

Maniyanpilla Adhava Maniyanpilla

Aparichithan

Chinthamani Kolacase

Orma Mathram

Sye Raa Narasimha Reddy

Pulimurugan

Puli

saira narasimha reddy

Brothers Day

Kannur Squad

== Transportation ==
Nearest railway station Angamaly for Kalady

Cochin International Airport is about 18 kilometres from Malayattoor. The airport is well connected to all major airports in India and also connected to many foreign cities. Direct flights are available to Chennai, New Delhi, Mumbai, Bangalore and Kolkata.

== Pilgrimage ==
St. Thomas is believed to have landed in Kerala at Kodungallur (Cranganore) in AD 52.

AD 62 St Thomas returns to Malankara coast via Malayatur where he establishes ‘the half Church’ (a small Christian community dependent on the Church of Maliamkara).

Oral tradition says that while travelling through Malayattoor, faced with hostile natives, he fled to the hilltop where he is said to have remained in prayer and that he left his foot prints on one of the rocks. According to beliefs, during prayer, he touched a rock, upon which blood poured from it. The chief festival is on the first Sunday after Easter. It is traditionally believed that St. Thomas used to make the Sign of the Cross on the rock, kiss it and pray at Kurisumudi. The story has it that a miraculous golden cross appeared at that particular spot. Pilgrims going up the hill to call out incessantly "Ponnum Kurishu Muthappo, Ponmala Kayattom", meaning "O Patriarch of the Golden Cross! Climb we shall, this golden hill!" This Shrine was promoted to Archdiocesan status by Archbishop Mar Varkey Vithayathil on 4 September 1998. There is also a very ancient Church in the name of St Thomas (Estd. 900) at Malayattoor on the bank of Periyar River which serves as the parish Church at present. The annual festival of this church is known as 'Malayatoor Perunal' and it is celebrated in the months of March–April.
St. Thomas and Thamizakam :The place of St. Thomas in the life of Tamil believers is something not to be overlooked. Anyone would be moved at the sight of an ardent but the simple faith of a Tamil pilgrim, a usual scene on the mountain. According to Rt. Rev. Dr. Soosa Pakiam the "Archbishop of Trivandrum, "Muthappan" the name by which the devotees invoke St. Thomas on the mountain, may have come from Tamizakam. A good number of pilgrims that visit Kurisumudy and seek Muthappan's blessings is from Tamil Nadu. The vital role played by the caravan route that existed between Kodungalloor and Madras from time immemorial has certainly contributed to this spiritual and cultural bond that exists between Kerala and Tamil Nadu. Later on the hunters went to the mountain for hunting.While they stayed in the night they saw a glittering sign of cross on the rock.Out of curiosity they struck there with their rude weapons. To their surprise blood gushed out. They ran to the valley and told the locals. They went to the mountain and while they prayed there they got many miracles. This is the humble beginning of Kurisumudy Pilgrimage.

== Quarries ==
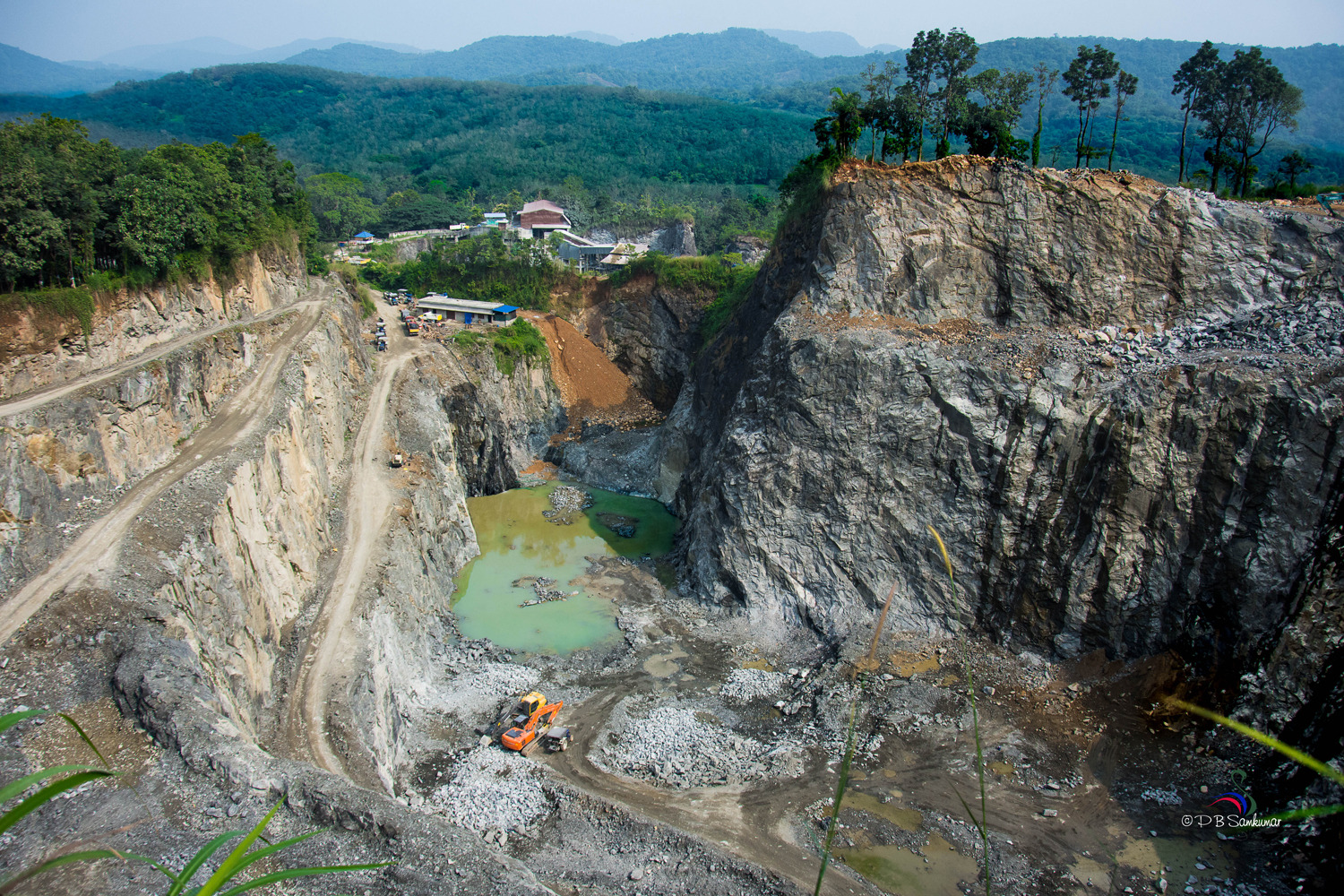
A Stone quarry near malayattoor hill.

There are 25 stone quarries working near malayattooor hill.

== See also ==
- Periyar
- Malayattoor Ramakrishnan
- Malayatoor Church
- Malayattoor Carnival
