= Manjapra Mohan =

Mohan
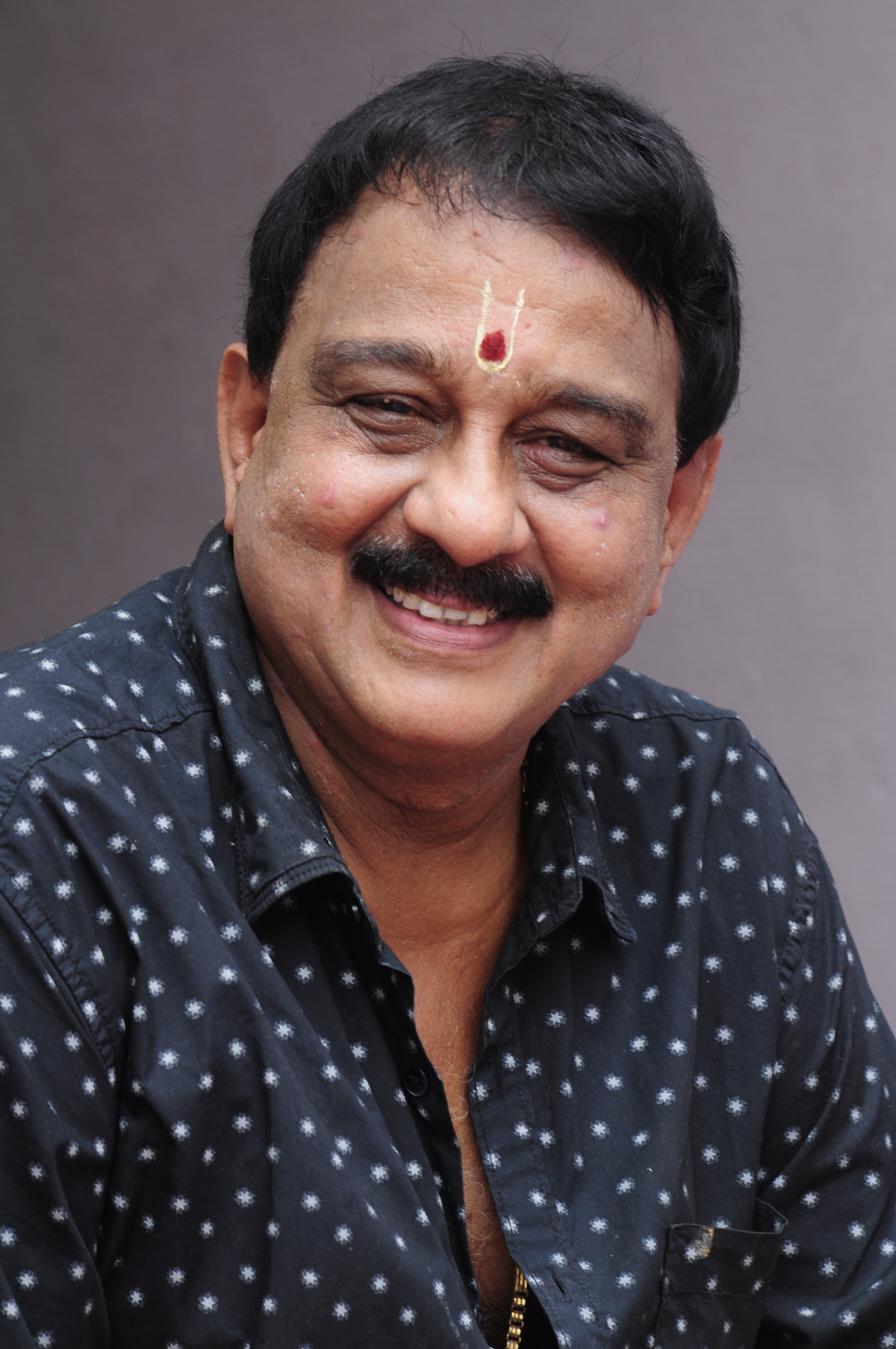

Background information
- Born: Manjapra, Kerala, India
- Occupation: Singer
- Website: www.manjapramohan.com

Manjapra Mohan is a devotional singer from Kerala, India. He is the nephew of M. D. Ramanathan, a famous singer of Carnatic music. He has written, composed and sung many bhajans in Tamil, Malayalam and Sanskrit, praising almost all Hindu deities.

Mohan was born in the village of Manjapra in Palakkad district, Kerala, in a devout Tamil Brahmin family. M. D. Ramanathan is his paternal uncle. Mohan sings in the Sampradaya Bhajan style and has performed in India, the Middle East and Europe.

== Awards and honours ==
- In the year 2000 Namasankeertana trust, Dombvli, Mumbai convened by former election commissioner Sri T.N. Seshan recognized his contributions towards Namasankirtan.
- Recognized by the Toronto Ayyappa Temple and also by the Sidhi Vinayagar Aalayam of Switzerland.
- In the year 2003, he was awarded the title of "Bhajana Gandharvan" by the Hindu tradition and culture, Coimbatore.
- Felicitated by Nallepilly Narayanalayam trust in 2006 and awarded the title as "Namapracharaka Ratna."
- Awarded "Bhajan Samrat" by the Sabari Trust, of Bangalore in the year 2007.
- In 2010 he has been awarded by the Sukritham Association of the United Arab Emirates (Dubai), as "Bhajana Ratna of 2010". On the occasion of the 75th birthday celebrations of Kanchi Periyaval Sri Jayendra Saraswathi Shankaracharya Swamigal, Shri Manjapra Mohan was invited to sing bhajans and received the blessings from Periyaval.
- Conferred with the title of "Bhajana Ratnakara Chakravarthy" by SriJayendra Saraswathi Swamigal in a glittering function at Sri Krishna Gana Sabha Chennai in 2010 along with other great vidwans like Umayalpuram Sivaraman, T K Govind Rao, Manakal Raganathan...
- Blessed by "Bhagavatha Hamsam Brahmasri Malliyoor Sankaran Namboothiri" On the occasion of his birthday celebrations at Malliyoor Vinayaka Temple – Kottyam and awarded with the title "Namasankeerthana Visharadhan."
- Awarded "Rasika Jana Priya" by Paarijatham Charitable Trust – Vadavalli Coimbatore in 2011.

== Albums ==
Year	Month	Album name	Publisher
2012	December	Namasangeerthanam - Vol. 12	Gaurang Audios
2012	March	Namasangeerthanam - Vol. 11	Gaurang Audios
2010	November	Namasangeerthanam - Vol. 10	Gaurang Audios
2009	November	Namasangeerthanam - Vol. 9	Gaurang Audios
2009	January	Sasthaprasadam	Gaurang Audios
2009	January	Namasangeerthanam - Vol. 8	Gaurang Audios
2008	December	Sastha Preethi	Gaurang Audios
2008	December	Eeswarabajanam	Gaurang Audios
2007	December	Namasangeerthanam - Vol. 7	Gaurang Audios
2007	December	Namasangeerthanam - Vol. 6	Gaurang Audios
2007	December	Namasangeerthanam - Vol. 5	Gaurang Audios
2007	December	Namasangeerthanam - Vol. 4	Gaurang Audios
2007	December	Namasangeerthanam - Vol. 3	Gaurang Audios
2007	December	Namasangeerthanam - Vol. 2	Gaurang Audios
2007	December	Namasangeerthanam - Vol. 1	Gaurang Audios
