= Hinduism in Kerala =

Keralite Hindus കേരളീയ ഹിന്ദുക്കൾ keraleeya hindukkal
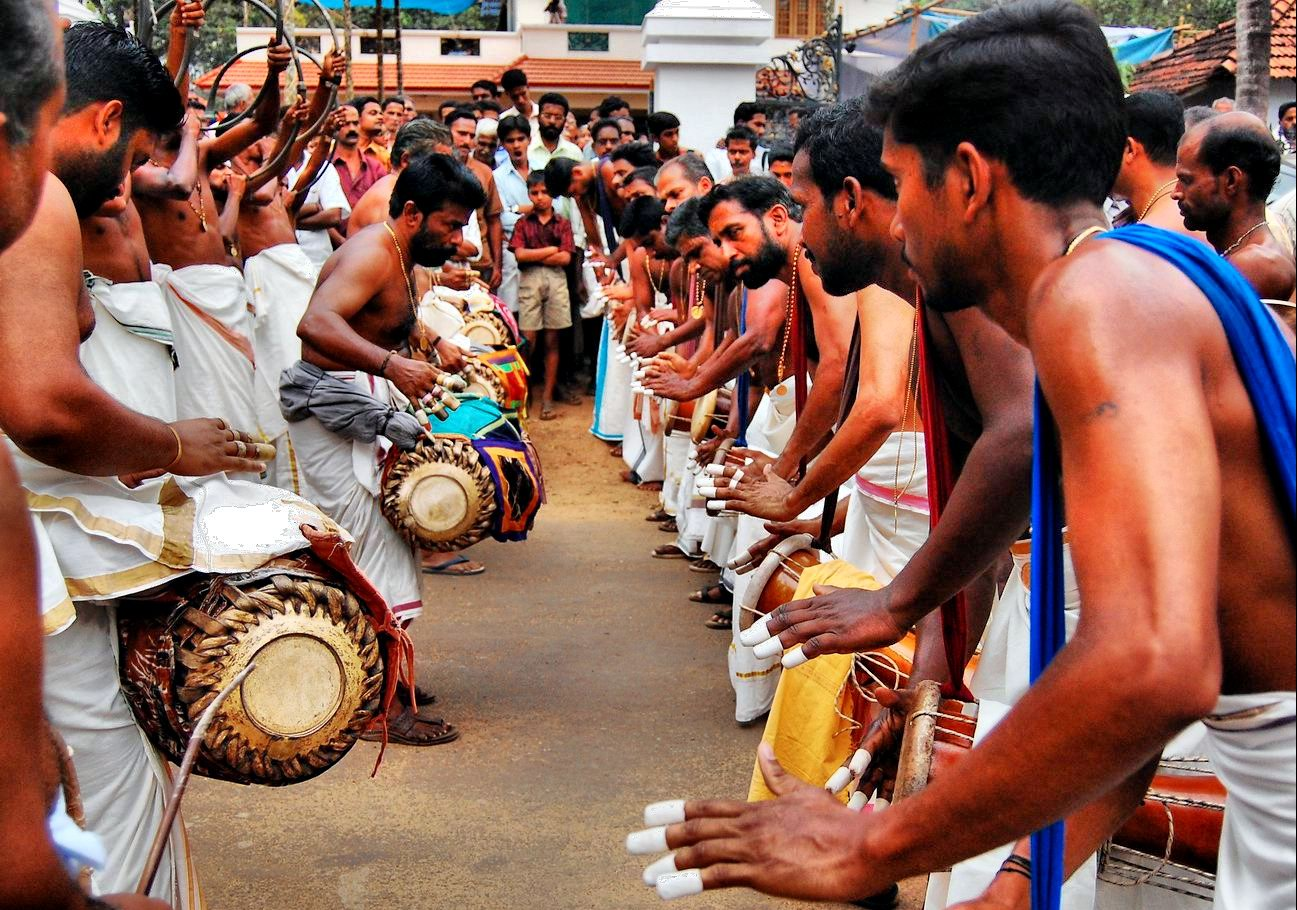
- Panchavadyam (orchestra of 5 instruments) during a festival

Total population
- 18,282,492 (2011); 54.7% of total population▼

Religions
- Hinduism

Languages
- Sacred; Sanskrit; Others: Malayalam

Related ethnic groups
- Keralite Muslims and Keralite Christians

Hinduism is the largest religion in Kerala and Hindu lineages together make up 54.7% of the population of the state according to the 2011 census.

== Background ==
Hinduism is the most widely professed faith in Kerala. According to 2011 Census of India figures, 54.7% of Kerala's residents are Hindus. Hindus represent the biggest religious group in all districts except Malappuram.

The legends regarding the origin of Kerala are Hindu in nature. Kerala produced several saints and movements.

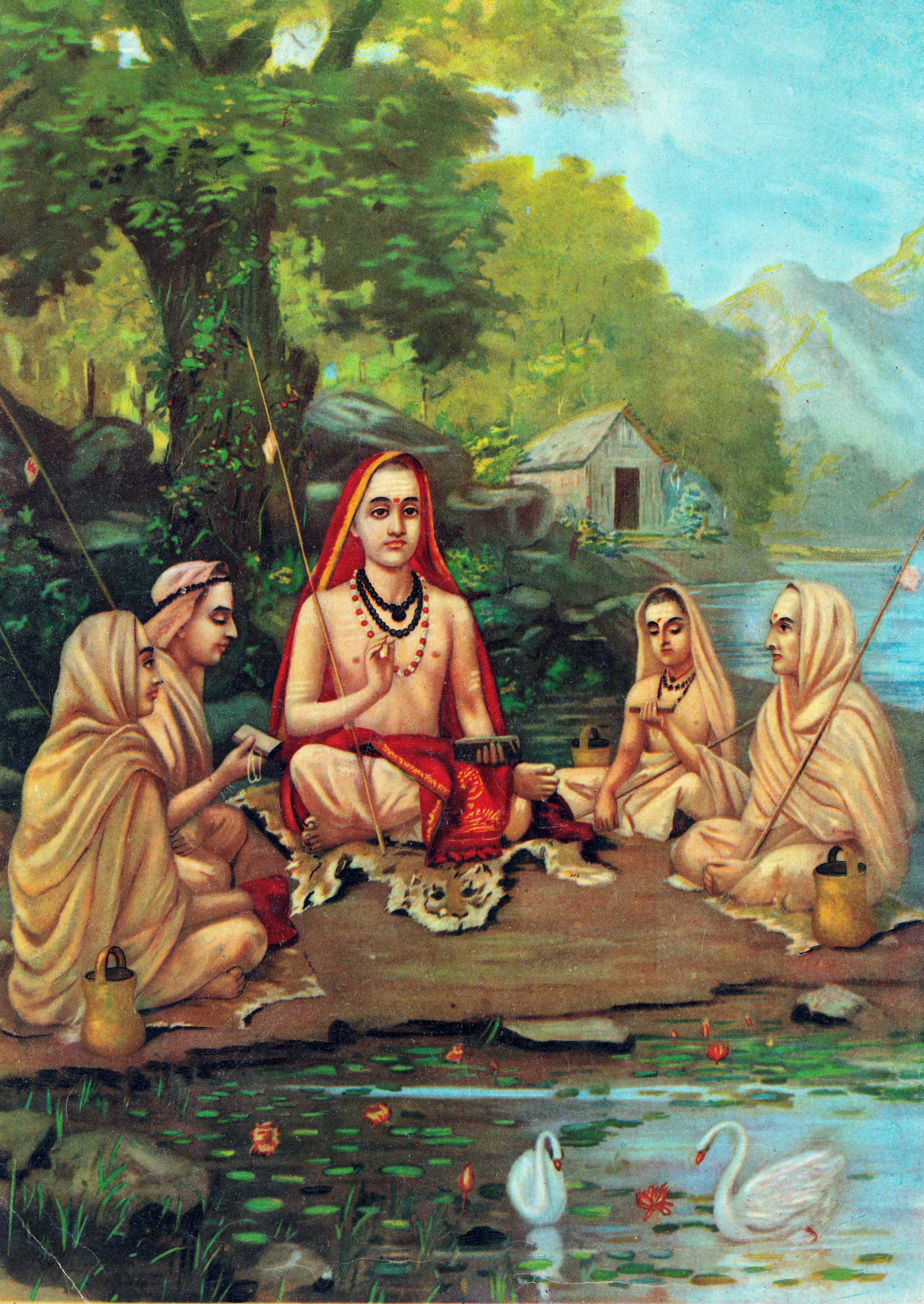
Adi Shankara, was from Kerala.

Adi Shankara was a religious philosopher who contributed to Hinduism and propagated the philosophy of Advaita. He was instrumental in establishing four mathas at Sringeri, Dwarka, Puri and Jyotirmath. Melpathur Narayana Bhattathiri was another religious figure who composed Narayaniyam, a collection of verses in praise of the Hindu God Krishna.

Various practises of Hinduism are unique to Kerala. Worship of Shiva and Vishnu is popular in Kerala. Lord Krishna is worshipped widely in all parts of Kerala, Guruvayur being one of the most famous temples in the state. Malayali Hindus also worship Bhagavathi as a form of Shakti. Almost every village in Kerala has a Bhagavati Goddess. Hindus in Kerala also strongly believe in power of snake gods and usually have sacred snake groves known as Sarpa Kavu near to their houses.

Malayali Hindus have ceremonies such as Chorunu (first feeding of rice to a child) and Vidyāraṃbhaṃ.

== Demographics ==
=== Hindu population by district ===
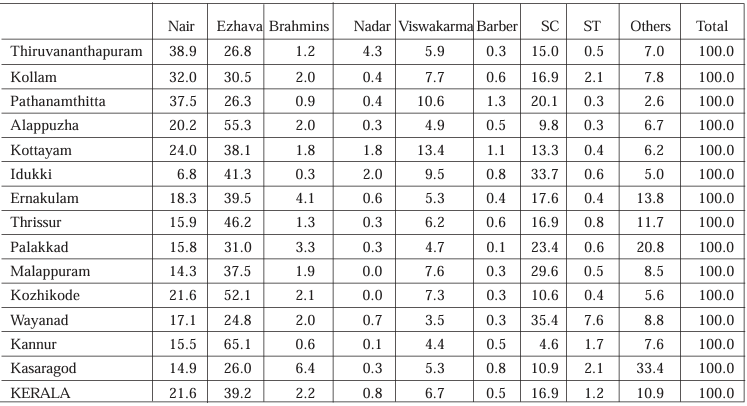
Percent Distribution of District Population by Hindu Castes

Districts	Population(2001)	Population(2011)	Hindu Population(2011)	Hindus %
Kasargod	1,203,342	1,307,375	729,908	55.83%
Kannur	2,412,365	2,523,003	1,509,513	59.83%
Wayanad	786,627	817,420	404,460	49.48%
Kozhikode	2,878,498	3,086,293	1,734,806	56.21%
Malappuram	3,629,640	4,112,920	1,135,166	27.60%
Palakkad	2,617,072	2,809,934	1,875,912	66.76%
Thrissur	2,975,440	3,121,200	1,823,405	58.42%
Ernakulam	3,098,378	3,282,388	1,509,570	45.99%
Idukki	1,128,605	1,093,156	541,845	48.86%
Kottayam	1,952,901	1,974,551	983,524	49.81%
Alappuzha	2,105,349	2,127,789	1,460,515	68.64%
Pathanamthitta	1,231,577	1,197,412	681,687	56.93%
Kollam	2,584,118	2,635,375	1,697,709	64.42%
Thiruvananthapuram	3,234,707	3,301,427	2,209,975	66.94%
Total	31,841,374	33,406,061	18,282,492	54.9%

=== Historical growth ===
Religious Demographics of Kerala (1901–2011)
Census Year	Hindus		Decadal rate (%)
1901	8,978,305	68.5%	N/A
1911	4,762,393	66.8%	-8.77
1921	5,052,039	64.9%	-6.08
1931	6,021,982	63.4%	-19.20
1941	6,699,600	61.8%	-11.25
1951	8,344,351	61.6%	-24.55
1961	10,282,568	60.9%	-23.23
1971	12,683,277	59.4%	-23.35
1981	14,901,347	58.2%	-16.70
1991	16,668,587	57.3%	-12.62
2001	17,920,105	56.3%	-7.51
2011	18,282,492	54.9%	-2.02

== Hindu temples ==
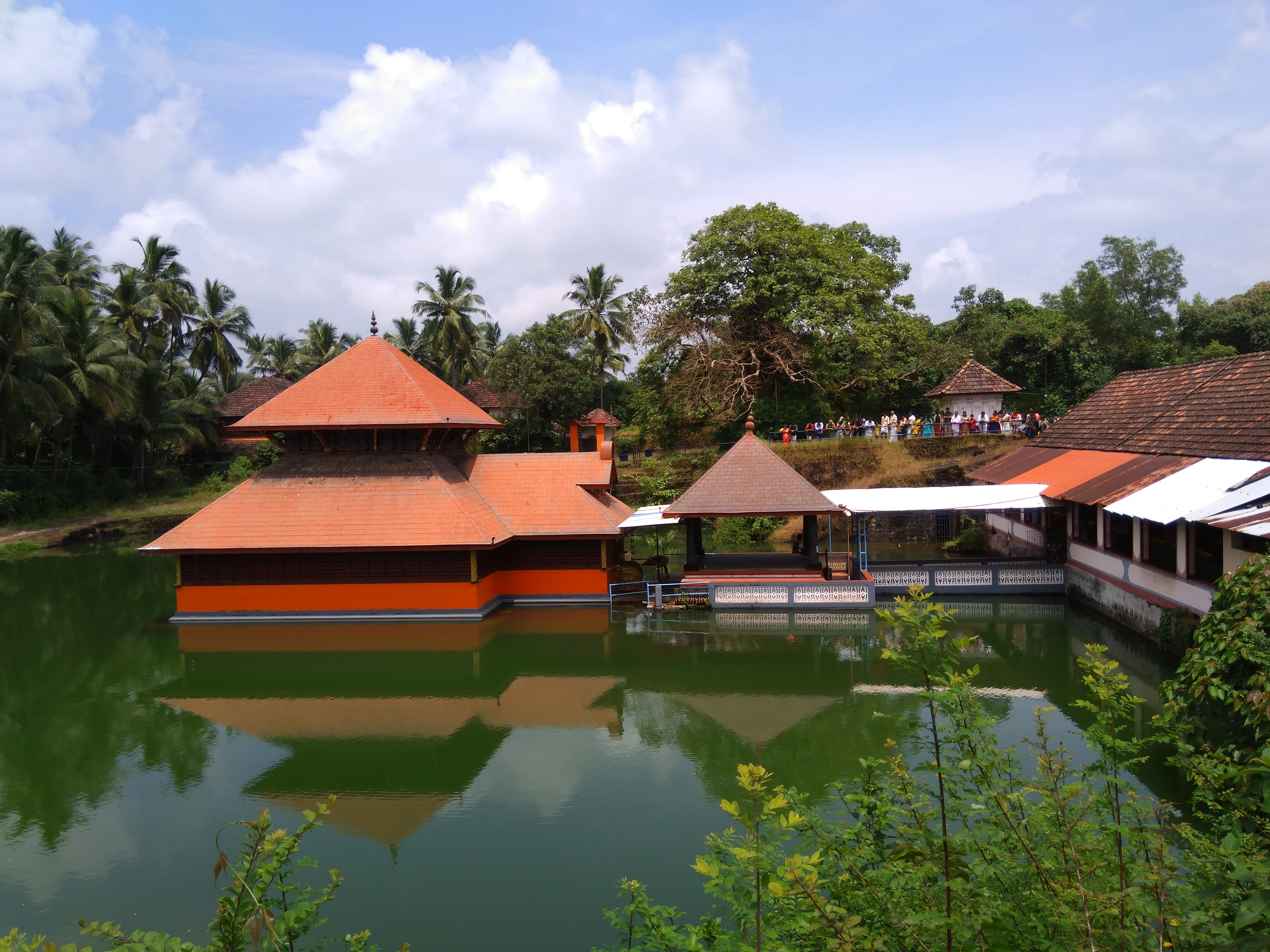
Ananthapura Lake Temple, Kasaragod.

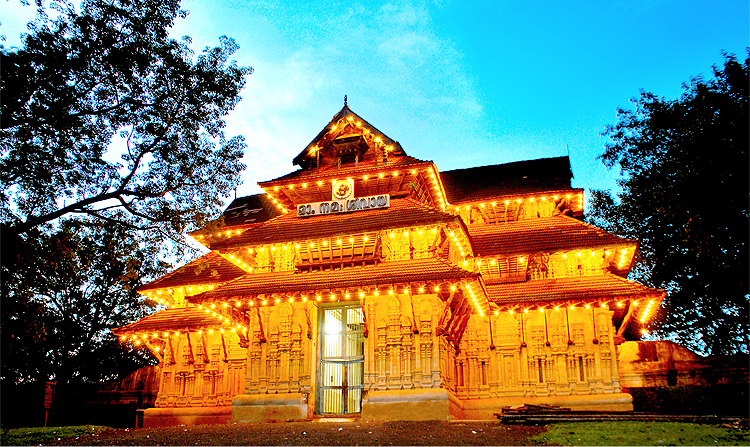
Vadakkunnathan Temple dedicated to Shiva at Thrissur.

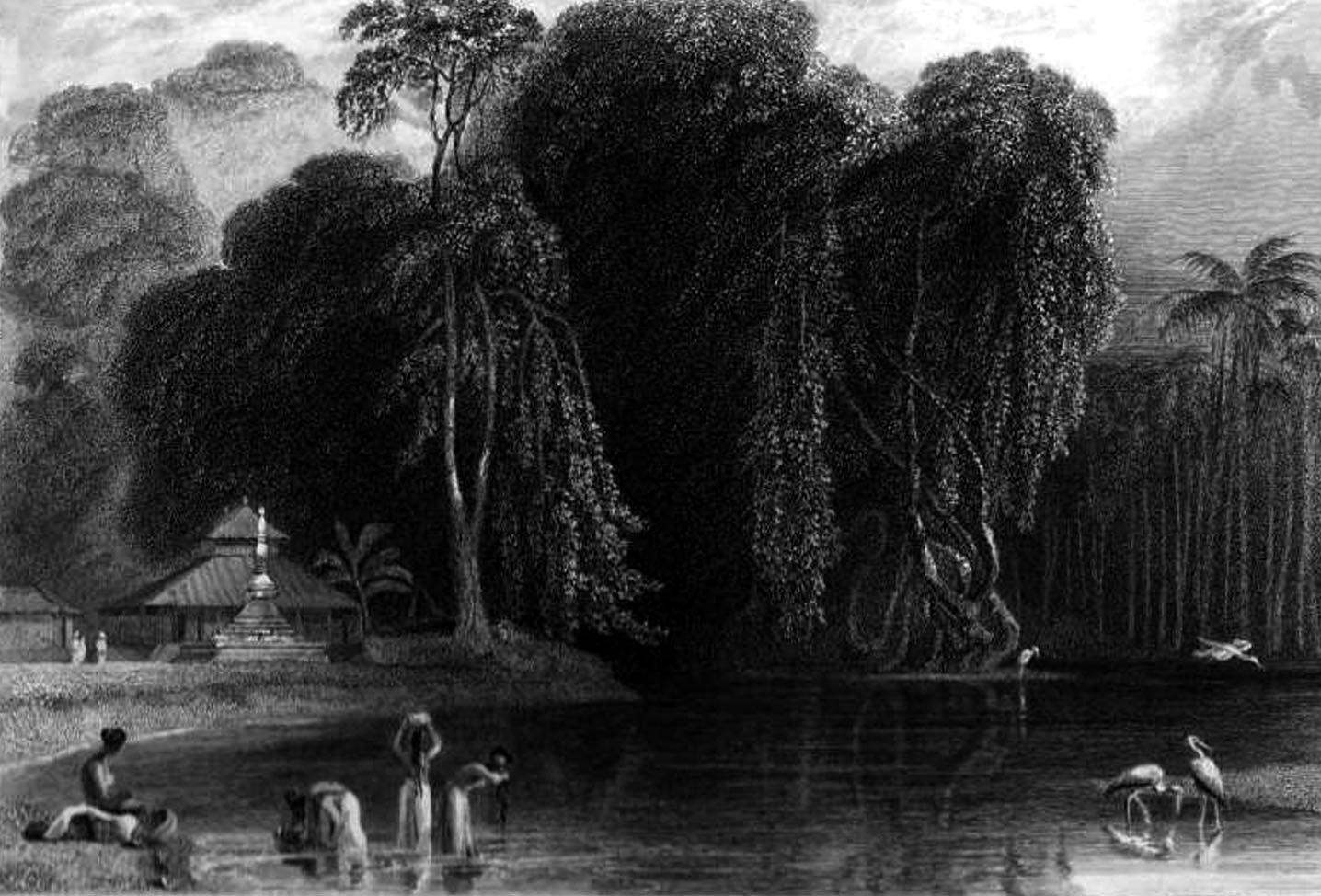
A Hindu temple and pond associated with it in Kerala.

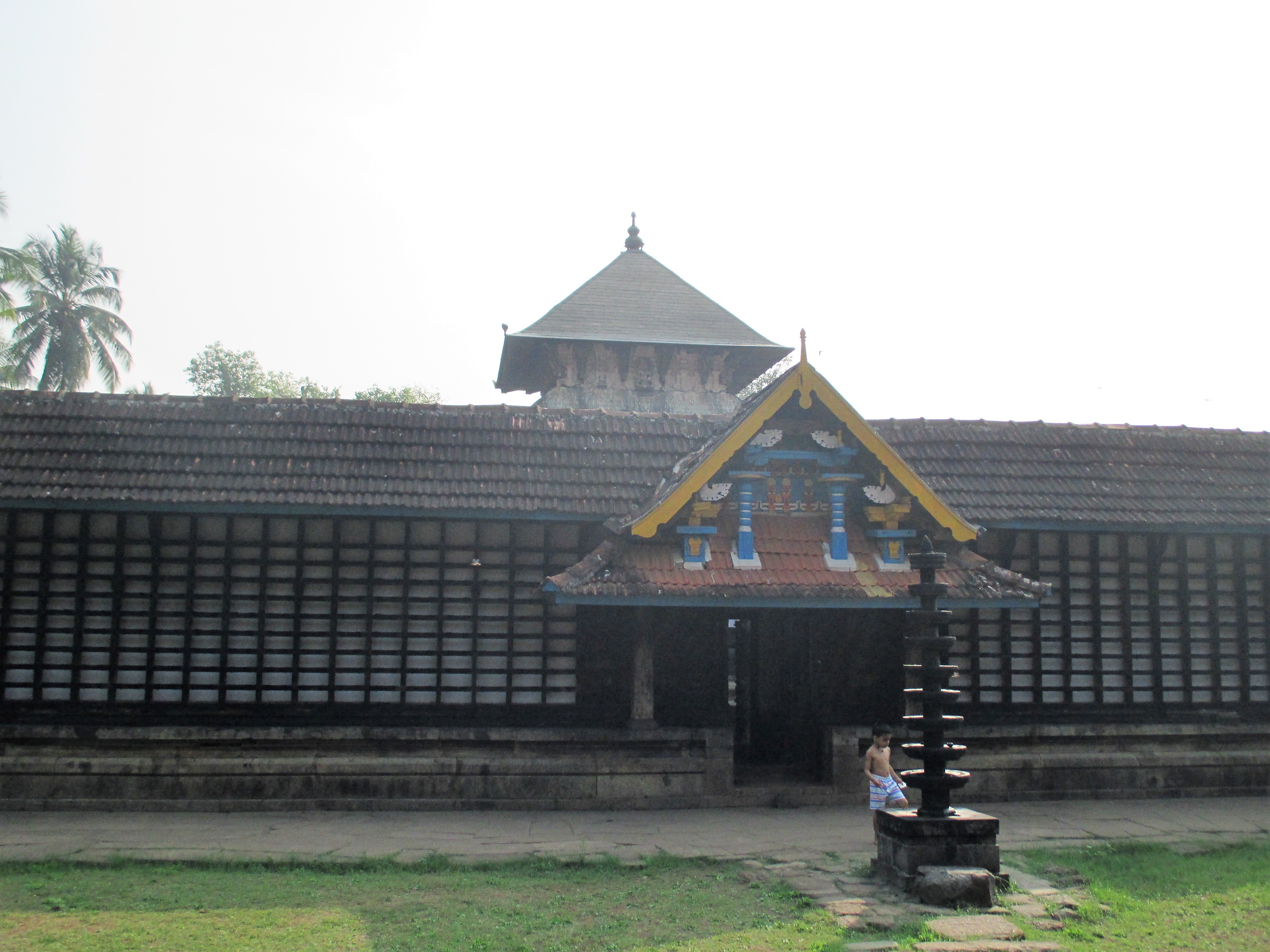
Thirunavaya Navamukunda Temple.

Some of the most notable temples are:

- Ananthapura Lake Temple
- Angadipuram
- Thirumandhamkunnu Temple
- Alathiyoor Hanuman Temple
- Bhayankavu Bhagavathi Temple
- Kadampuzha Devi Temple
- Keraladeshpuram Temple
- Panniyur Sri Varahamurthy Temple
- Sukapuram Dakshinamoorthy Temple
- Thirunavaya Navamukunda Temple
- Triprangode Siva Temple
- Tali Shiva Temple
- Trikkandiyur Siva Temple
- Thrissur Vadakkunnathan Temple
- Guruvayur Temple
- Ambalappuzha Sree Krishna Swamy Temple
- Lokanarkavu Temple
- Thirunelli Temple
- Sabarimala Ayyappa Temple
- Thiruvananthapuram Padmanabhaswamy Temple
- Aranmula Parthasarathy Temple
- Chottanikkara Temple
- Chengannur Mahadeva Temple
- Parassinikadavu Muthappan Temple
- Trichambaram Temple
- Parumala Valiya Panayannarkavu Devi Temple
- Chettikulangara Devi Temple
- Mannarasala Temple
- Chakkulathukavu Temple
- Sreevallabha Temple
- Kaviyoor Mahadevar Temple
- Sree Poornathrayesa Temple
- Kodungallur Bhagavathy Temple
- Vazhappally Maha Siva Temple
- Attukal Temple
- Trikkur Mahadeva Temple
- Rajarajeshwara Temple
- Kandiyoor Sree Mahadeva Temple
- Oachira Temple

== Saints ==
Adi Shankara, the originator of Advaita Vedanta, was born in Kalady and was likely a Nambuthiri. Many Hindu saints and swamis from many castes have lived in Kerala. Sree Narayana Guru, Enadinatha, Ilakkulaccanrar, Tiruppana were all outside the Brahminical caste fold; Cheraman Nayanar was a Kothayar; and Chattampi Swamikal, Swami Sathyananda Saraswathi and Swami Chinmayananda, the Nair caste. The Parayas of Kerala claim descent from Vasishtha. There is a shrine in Kollengode in memory of a lower-caste saint, Paakkanar. The theatrical dance of Rapayan Tullal is narrated by a descendant of Pakkanar. The Periya Puranam, possibly written by a Paraya, describes the Parayas.

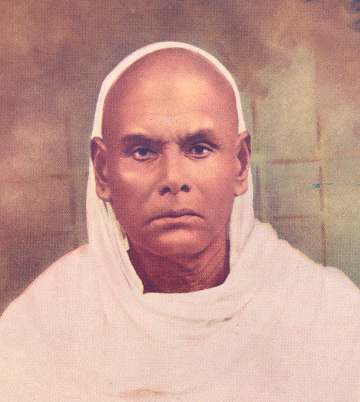
Narayana Guru at the age of sixty.

Swami Sathyananda Saraswathi is popularly regarded as the father of contemporary Hindu renaissance in Kerala for the victorious movements he led for temple rights and the establishment of Hindu Aikya Vedi for integrating people of all castes into one religion. He is reckoned as the greatest karmayogi to uphold Sanatana Dharma since Swami Vivekananda internationally. Sree Narayana Jayanti (Narayana Guru's birthday) and Sree Narayana Samadhi Day (the occasion of his samadhi) are public holidays in Kerala.

Mata Amritanandamayi, known among her devotees as Amma, was selected to represent the Hindu Dharma in the World Parliament of Religions in September 1991. Bhagawan Nityananda was another important Hindu saint widely recognized.

Several Hindu movements important to the development of Hinduism took place in Kerala. The Karppillikkavu Sree Mahadeva Temple, (one of the most ancient in India) dedicated to the Kirata Avatar of Lord Shiva still exists in Kerala.

== Religious education ==
According to Sudha Nambudiri, Thanthra Vidyapeedam, a low profile Vedic and tantric pathshala (ritual school) in Aluva founded by Kalpuzha Divakaran Namboodiripad and P. Madhavji in 1972 taught students in Kerala's temple shastra, Kerala's form of temple rituals, which follows Adi Shankara traditions in the Gurukulam system. Namboodiripad says Vidyapeedam only admits ten tenth standard passed boys with prior academic knowledge of the Sanskrit language, selected on the basis of their individual horoscopes every year. The seven year curriculum includes theoretical and practical studies in temple rituals based on Tantra Samuchayam, authored by Chennas Narayanan Nampoothiri, the Vedas, the Sanskrit language, Vaastu Shastra, Jyothisha, Yoga and meditation. When completed, students are awarded a postgraduate level degree known as Thanthraratna in Sanskrit by Ujjain's Maharishi Sandipani Rashtriya Ved Vidya Pratishthan and promotes students to temple priests or Sanskrit language teachers. Aarsha Vidya Samajam founded by Aacharya Sri K R Manoj Ji at 1999 is an educational institution for preaching of Pancha Kartavyas; five duties: Adhyayana (Study), Anushthana (Practice), Pracharana (Promotion), Adhyapana (Teaching) and Samrakshana (Protection) of Sanathana Dharma. This institution was born with the Anugraha and Ashirwada of great Gurus for achieving the motto of Krinwantho Vishwamaryam; to make the whole world noble, through right education of Sanathana Dharma, which was not merely a divine call, but also a vision of the Aarsha Guru Paramparas, prayer of the Sadhaks, dream of our ancestors, and the birth purpose of our nation itself.

== See also ==
- Demographics of Kerala
- Hinduism in India
