= Perambalur Assembly constituency =

One of the 234 State Legislative Assembly Constituencies in Tamil Nadu, in India

Coordinates: 11.23°N 78.88°E

Perambalur
- Constituency No. 147 for the Tamil Nadu Legislative Assembly

Constituency details
- Country: India
- Region: South India
- State: Tamil Nadu
- District: Perambalur
- Lok Sabha constituency: Perambalur
- Established: 1951
- Total electors: 290,731
- Reservation: SC

Member of Legislative Assembly
- 17th Tamil Nadu Legislative Assembly
- Incumbent Sivakumar.K
- Party: TVK
- Alliance: TVK+
- Elected year: 2026

Perambalur is a state assembly constituency in Tamil Nadu. Its State Assembly Constituency number is 147. It comes under Perambalur Lok Sabha constituency. It is reserved for the Scheduled Castes. It is one of the 234 State Legislative Assembly Constituencies in Tamil Nadu, in India.

== Members of Legislative Assembly ==
Year	Member	Political party
Madras State
1952	Palamimuthu	Tamil Nadu Toilers' Party
1952	Paramasivam	Tamil Nadu Toilers' Party
1957	K. Periyannan	Indian National Congress
1957	Krishnasamy	Indian National Congress
1962	T. P. Alagamuthu	Dravida Munnetra Kazhagam
1967	J. S. Rasu	Dravida Munnetra Kazhagam
Tamil Nadu
1971	J. S. Raju	Dravida Munnetra Kazhagam
1977	S. V. Ramasamy	All India Anna Dravida Munnetra Kazhagam
1980	J. S. Raju	Dravida Munnetra Kazhagam
1984	K. Nallamuthu	Indian National Congress
1989	K. Pitchamuthu	Communist Party of India
1991	T. Sezhiyan	All India Anna Dravida Munnetra Kazhagam
1996	M. Devarajan	Dravida Munnetra Kazhagam
2001	P. Rajarathnam	All India Anna Dravida Munnetra Kazhagam
2006	M. Rajkumar	Dravida Munnetra Kazhagam
2011	R. Thamizhselvan	All India Anna Dravida Munnetra Kazhagam
2016	R. Thamizhselvan	All India Anna Dravida Munnetra Kazhagam
2021	M. Prabhakaran	Dravida Munnetra Kazhagam
2026	K. Sivakumar	Tamilaga Vettri Kazhagam

== Election results ==
Vote share of winning candidates
2026	35.83%
2021	51.27%
2016	45.27%
2011	52.19%
2006	45.18%
2001	53.45%
1996	55.07%
1991	70.69%
1989	34.51%
1984	63.88%
1980	40.98%
1977	56.53%
1971	55.28%
1967	51.03%
1962	55.38%
1957	22.49%
1952	16.10%

=== 2026 ===
2026 Tamil Nadu Legislative Assembly election: Perambalur
Party	Candidate	Votes	%	±%
TVK	Sivakumar.K	90,882	35.83	New
DMK	Dr. Jayalakshmi.S.T	76,489	30.15	▼21.12
AIADMK	Thamizhselvan.R	72,716	28.67	▼9.57
NTK	Suganya.J	9,474	3.74	▼4.10
NOTA	NOTA	1,160	0.46	▼0.33
BSP	Arivazhagan.D	678	0.27	New
Independent	Subramanian.R	595	0.23	New
Independent	Shiyamala.M	421	0.17	New
TVK	Dhamodharan.S	360	0.14	New
Independent	Chandrakumar.P	339	0.13	New
Independent	Jayachandran.B	305	0.12	New
Independent	Anandajothi Paramasivam	235	0.09	New
Margin of victory		14,393	5.68	▼7.35
Turnout		2,53,654	87.25	▲8.58
Registered electors		2,90,731		▼11,961
TVK gain from DMK		Swing	▲35.83	

=== 2021 ===
2021 Tamil Nadu Legislative Assembly election: Perambalur
Party	Candidate	Votes	%	±%
DMK	M. Prabhakaran	122,090	51.27%	+9.07
AIADMK	R. Thamizhselvan	91,056	38.24%	−7.03
NTK	M. Maheshwari	18,673	7.84%	+6.71
DMDK	K. Rajendran	2,932	1.23%	−3.91
NOTA	NOTA	1,884	0.79%	−0.57
Margin of victory		31,034	13.03%	9.96%
Turnout		238,142	78.67%	−1.50%
Rejected ballots		455	0.19%	
Registered electors		302,692		
DMK gain from AIADMK		Swing	6.00%	

=== 2016 ===
2016 Tamil Nadu Legislative Assembly election: Perambalur
Party	Candidate	Votes	%	±%
AIADMK	R. Thamizhselvan	101,073	45.27%	−6.92
DMK	P. Sivakami	94,220	42.20%	+0.12
DMDK	K. Rajendran	11,482	5.14%	New
PMK	M. Sathiyaseelan	4,222	1.89%	New
NOTA	NOTA	3,040	1.36%	New
NTK	Arunkumar	2,521	1.13%	New
BJP	M. Kaliyaperumal	1,981	0.89%	New
SS	C. Pichaimuthu	1,311	0.59%	New
Margin of victory		6,853	3.07%	−7.04%
Turnout		223,273	80.17%	−2.44%
Registered electors		278,485		
AIADMK hold		Swing	-6.92%	

=== 2011 ===
2011 Tamil Nadu Legislative Assembly election: Perambalur
Party	Candidate	Votes	%	±%
AIADMK	R. Thamizhselvan	98,497	52.19%	+11.97
DMK	M. Prabhakaran	79,418	42.08%	−3.1
IJK	J. Jayabalaji	3,668	1.94%	New
Independent	S. Ravichandran	2,020	1.07%	New
BSP	S. Krishnamoorthy	1,851	0.98%	New
Independent	V. P. Sellamuthu	1,442	0.76%	New
Independent	V. Subhashini	1,117	0.59%	New
Margin of victory		19,079	10.11%	5.15%
Turnout		188,725	82.62%	8.69%
Registered electors		228,439		
AIADMK gain from DMK		Swing	7.01%	

=== 2006 ===
2006 Tamil Nadu Legislative Assembly election: Perambalur
Party	Candidate	Votes	%	±%
DMK	M. Rajkumar	60,478	45.18%	+7.67
AIADMK	M. Sundaram	53,840	40.22%	−13.23
DMDK	P. Manimegalai	12,007	8.97%	New
Independent	C. Pugazhenthi	2,481	1.85%	New
Independent	K. Bhaskaran	1,934	1.44%	New
BJP	R. Pitchaimuthu	1,530	1.14%	New
Margin of victory		6,638	4.96%	−10.98%
Turnout		133,863	73.93%	11.62%
Registered electors		181,069		
DMK gain from AIADMK		Swing	-8.27%	

=== 2001 ===
2001 Tamil Nadu Legislative Assembly election: Perambalur
Party	Candidate	Votes	%	±%
AIADMK	P. Rajarathnam	67,074	53.45%	+18.22
DMK	S. Vallaban	47,070	37.51%	−17.57
MDMK	S. Kannan	6,960	5.55%	−0.19
Independent	P. Marimuthu	4,395	3.50%	New
Margin of victory		20,004	15.94%	−3.91%
Turnout		125,499	62.31%	−7.41%
Registered electors		202,003		
AIADMK gain from DMK		Swing	-1.63%	

=== 1996 ===
1996 Tamil Nadu Legislative Assembly election: Perambalur
Party	Candidate	Votes	%	±%
DMK	M. Devarajan	64,918	55.07%	+31.08
AIADMK	S. Murugesan	41,517	35.22%	−35.47
MDMK	M. Vibushnan	6,762	5.74%	New
Independent	S. P. Thangavel	611	0.52%	New
Margin of victory		23,401	19.85%	−26.84%
Turnout		117,875	69.72%	5.56%
Registered electors		177,313		
DMK gain from AIADMK		Swing	-15.61%	

=== 1991 ===
1991 Tamil Nadu Legislative Assembly election: Perambalur
Party	Candidate	Votes	%	±%
AIADMK	T. Sezhiyan	76,202	70.69%	+63.36
DMK	M. Devarajan	25,868	24.00%	−10.09
PMK	K. Kulandan	3,544	3.29%	New
BJP	K. Anndurai	1,412	1.31%	New
Margin of victory		50,334	46.69%	46.26%
Turnout		107,803	64.16%	−4.37%
Registered electors		173,979		
AIADMK gain from CPI		Swing	36.17%	

=== 1989 ===
1989 Tamil Nadu Legislative Assembly election: Perambalur
Party	Candidate	Votes	%	±%
CPI	K. Pitchamuthu	34,829	34.51%	New
DMK	M. Devaraj	34,398	34.09%	+3
INC	K. Nallamuthu	21,300	21.11%	−42.77
AIADMK	N. Selvaraju	7,389	7.32%	New
Independent	P. Periyasami	1,166	1.16%	New
Independent	M. Palanimuthu	1,054	1.04%	New
Margin of victory		431	0.43%	−32.36%
Turnout		100,912	68.53%	−4.17%
Registered electors		151,357		
CPI gain from INC		Swing	-29.36%	

=== 1984 ===
1984 Tamil Nadu Legislative Assembly election: Perambalur
Party	Candidate	Votes	%	±%
INC	K. Nallamuthu	57,021	63.88%	New
DMK	T. Sarojini	27,751	31.09%	−9.9
Independent	N. Srinivasan	2,657	2.98%	New
Independent	S. Subramanian	1,835	2.06%	New
Margin of victory		29,270	32.79%	26.42%
Turnout		89,264	72.71%	14.24%
Registered electors		130,635		
INC gain from DMK		Swing	22.89%	

=== 1980 ===
1980 Tamil Nadu Legislative Assembly election: Perambalur
Party	Candidate	Votes	%	±%
DMK	J. S. Raju	28,680	40.98%	+16.11
AIADMK	M. Angamuthu	24,224	34.62%	−21.91
Independent	K. Vadivelu	16,155	23.09%	New
JP	M. Palanimuthu	529	0.76%	New
Independent	V. Veppanthatai Matesan	389	0.56%	New
Margin of victory		4,456	6.37%	−25.28%
Turnout		69,977	58.47%	1.86%
Registered electors		121,376		
DMK gain from AIADMK		Swing	-15.54%	

=== 1977 ===
1977 Tamil Nadu Legislative Assembly election: Perambalur
Party	Candidate	Votes	%	±%
AIADMK	S. V. Ramasamy	37,400	56.53%	New
DMK	K. S. Velusamy	16,459	24.88%	−30.41
JP	R. Chandrabose Chilliah	8,826	13.34%	New
RPI	M. Samy	1,613	2.44%	New
Independent	T. Kaliaperumal	1,173	1.77%	New
Independent	P. Ramalingam	694	1.05%	New
Margin of victory		20,941	31.65%	9.41%
Turnout		66,165	56.61%	−79.00%
Registered electors		119,195		
AIADMK gain from DMK		Swing	1.24%	

=== 1971 ===
1971 Tamil Nadu Legislative Assembly election: Perambalur
Party	Candidate	Votes	%	±%
DMK	J. S. Raju	39,043	55.28%	+4.26
INC	K. Periyanan	23,335	33.04%	−10.72
Independent	T. Kaliyaperumal	5,545	7.85%	New
Independent	M. Palanimuthu	2,700	3.82%	New
Margin of victory		15,708	22.24%	14.98%
Turnout		70,623	135.61%	57.18%
Registered electors		55,108		
DMK hold		Swing	4.26%	

=== 1967 ===
1967 Madras Legislative Assembly election: Perambalur
Party	Candidate	Votes	%	±%
DMK	J. S. Raju	33,657	51.03%	−4.35
INC	M. Ayyakannu	28,864	43.76%	−0.86
Independent	T. Kaliyaperumal	1,978	3.00%	New
Independent	S. Kandasamy	1,088	1.65%	New
Independent	M. Palanimuthu	372	0.56%	New
Margin of victory		4,793	7.27%	−3.50%
Turnout		65,959	78.43%	−0.60%
Registered electors		87,627		
DMK hold		Swing	-4.35%	

=== 1962 ===
1962 Madras Legislative Assembly election: Perambalur
Party	Candidate	Votes	%	±%
DMK	T. P. Alagamuthu	38,686	55.38%	New
INC	R. Rama Reddiar	31,168	44.62%	+22.12
Margin of victory		7,518	10.76%	0.32%
Turnout		69,854	79.03%	−17.01%
Registered electors		91,148		
DMK gain from INC		Swing	32.89%	

=== 1957 ===
1957 Madras Legislative Assembly election: Perambalur
Party	Candidate	Votes	%	±%
INC	Krishnasami	38,975	22.49%	11.18%
Independent	Raja Chidambaram	20,883	12.05%	
INC	K. Periannan (SC)	20,375	11.76%	0.44%
Independent	Adimoolam	17,626	10.17%	
Independent	Palanimuthu (SC)	14,181	8.18%	
Independent	Alagesa Naidu	13,035	7.52%	
Independent	P. R. Rathinasami (SC)	11,214	6.47%	
Independent	M. Gopal (SC)	10,263	5.92%	
Independent	Karuppan (SC)	7,313	4.22%	
Independent	Gowdie	4,805	2.77%	
Independent	Pichamuthu (Sc)	4,742	2.74%	
Margin of victory		18,092	10.44%	7.34%
Turnout		1,73,264	96.04%	−20.75%
Registered electors		1,80,411		
INC gain from Independent		Swing	6.39%	

=== 1952 ===
1952 Madras Legislative Assembly election: Perambalur
Party	Candidate	Votes	%	±%
Independent	Paramasivam	25,411	16.10%	
TTP	Thangavelu	20,524	13.01%	
TTP	Palamimuthu	19,756	12.52%	
Independent	Pariannan	17,998	11.41%	
INC	Govindan	17,859	11.32%	11.32%
INC	Pernmal Reddiar	15,374	9.74%	9.74%
Independent	Vadival	9,802	6.21%	
Independent	Jagannada Reddiar	7,692	4.87%	
Independent	Haji Abdul Kadir Jamali	7,049	4.47%	
Independent	Meyyan	6,309	4.00%	
RPI	Sivapichai	5,441	3.45%	
Margin of victory		4,887	3.10%	
Turnout		1,57,788	116.79%	
Registered electors		1,35,101		
Independent win (new seat)				
