= N. V. Nambiathiri =

Sanskrit scholar (1931–2021)

Vedha Shri N. V. Nambiathiri
- എൻ. വി. നമ്പ്യാതിരി
- Born: 21 October 1931; Pathanamthitta, Kerala
- Died: August 2021 (aged 89)
- Occupation: Teacher
- Writing career
- Subject: Sanskrit texts
- Notable work: Sakthibadhran's Ascharyachoodamani (Malayalam translation)

Bhagavathacharyan Veda-Shri Parakkode N.V. Nambiathiri (21 October 1931 – August 2021) was a Sanskrit scholar, spiritual orator, teacher and educationist. He was born in Kerala and was the translator of many important Sanskrit texts to his mother tongue Malayalam, including works such as Sakthibhadran's Ascharyachoodamani (Devanāgarī: आश्चर्यचूडामणि ). He was the recipient of several award and honours given in gratitude of his services.

== Early life and career ==
He was born in Pathanamthitta, Kerala, on 21 October 1931, as the elder son of Damodarar and Saraswathi Antarjanam of Oorakathu Illom.He had an younger brother and a sister

He was educated at Kalady Brahmanandodayam School, then graduated from the Sanskrit College, Thiruvananthapuram. There, his understanding in Sanskrit etymology expanded under the guidance of scholars such as Guruswami Shastri, Dr. AG Krishnavaryar, Prof. MH Shastri. He received his B.T. from Government College, Kozhikode. He started his teaching career at Brahmanandodayam High School where he received his primary education. After the Samadhi of Swami Agamananda (his spiritual guide), he left the School and went to PGMTTI, Parakode where he continued his teaching career until his retirement from Government service by 1986.

== Works ==
As a member of the Textbook Committee of the Government of Kerala, he was involved in book writing at the State Institute of Education. He had been the Acharya (Main Teacher) of 7-day sessions on Bhagavata and 9-day sessions on Devi Bhagavata. He had translated Ashcharyachoodamani and Devi Bhagavatham to Malayalam. He is also the author of biographical works on Sri Ramakrishna Paramahamsa and Shri Sankaracharya.

== Awards and honours ==
He is a recipient of Travancore Devaswom Board Vedashree Award, Siddhinathananda Award, Ganesha Padma Award and Malliyoor Award of Akhila Bharatiya Bhagavata Satra Samiti in 2020.

== Death ==
Nambiathiri had been suffering from kidney diseases during his later years. He died on 21 August 2021 due to acute kidney failure followed by cardiac arrest at Amritha Institute of Medical Science, Cochin

== Family ==
He was married to Bhavaniamma, daughter of famous Gandhian Keshavan Nambiathiri, also a disciple of Rabindranath Tagore and an educationist himself. Children: V. Raghunath, Dr. V. Rajeev (Central University, Kasaragod). Daughter-in-law: P.N. Usha, C.L. Jayakumari.
