= P. Rajarathnam =

Member, Legislative Assembly of Tamil Nadu.
- In office 2001–2006
- Preceded by: M. Devarajan
- Succeeded by: M. Rajkumar
- Constituency: Perambalur

Personal details
- Born: 21 April 1961 Padalur
- Party: All India Anna Dravida Munnetra Kazhagam
- Profession: Advocate

P. Rajarathnam is an Indian politician and a former Member of the Legislative Assembly (MLA) of Tamil Nadu.

He is a native of Padalur village in the Perambalur district. Rajarathnam holds a Master of Commerce (M.Com.) and a Bachelor of Laws (B.L.) degree. He belongs to the All India Anna Dravida Munnetra Kazhagam (AIADMK) party. He successfully contested the 2001 Tamil Nadu Legislative Assembly election from the Perambalur Assembly constituency and became an MLA of Tamil Nadu.

== Electoral performance ==
=== 2001 ===
2001 Tamil Nadu Legislative Assembly election: Perambalur
Party	Candidate	Votes	%	±%
AIADMK	P. Rajarathnam	67,074	53.45%	+18.22
DMK	S. Vallaban	47,070	37.51%	−17.57
MDMK	S. Kannan	6,960	5.55%	−0.19
Independent	P. Marimuthu	4,395	3.50%	New
Margin of victory		20,004	15.94%	−3.91%
Turnout		125,499	62.31%	−7.41%
Registered electors		202,003		
AIADMK gain from DMK		Swing	-1.63%	
