= Krishnaswamy =

Krishnaswamy is an Indian name and may refer to:

- S. Krishnaswamy Aiyangar (1871–1946), Indian historian, academic and Dravidologist
- Puliyur Krishnaswamy Duraiswami (1912–1974), Indian orthopedic surgeon, medical writer, Director General of Health Services
- Alladi Krishnaswamy Iyer (1883–1953), Indian lawyer and member of the Constituent Assembly of India
- V. Krishnaswamy Iyer (1863–1911), Indian lawyer and High Court judge of Madras
- Krishnaswamy Kasturirangan (born 1940), Indian space scientist, headed the Indian Space Research Organisation 1994–2003
- A. Krishnaswamy (born 1965), member of the 14th Lok Sabha of India
- J. Krishnaswamy (1932-1981), former footballer better known as "Kittu" who represented Bengal and India
- K. A. Krishnaswamy (1932–2010), Indian politician and minister in the Government of Tamil Nadu
- K. Krishnaswamy, physician, social worker, Indian politician, former Member of the Legislative Assembly of Tamil Nadu
- Kamala Krishnaswamy, Indian scientist in nutrition
- S. Krishnaswamy, Indian documentary film-maker and writer who won the Padmashri award in 2009
- Sakthi Krishnaswamy, Tamil film writer from the 1950s to the 1970s
- Srinivasapuram Krishnaswamy (born 1943), the 19th Chief of Air Staff (India) from 2001 to 2004
- Rasipuram Krishnaswamy Iyer Laxman (1921–2015), Indian cartoonist, illustrator, and humorist
- Damal Krishnaswamy Pattammal (1919–2009), Indian Carnatic musician and a playback singer for film songs in Tamil
- C. R. Krishnaswamy Rao (1927–2013), administrator and civil servant
- K. Krishnaswamy Rao, CIE (1845–1923), Indian civil servant, judge and administrator, Diwan of Travancore 1898–1904
- Krishnaswamy Subrahmanyam (1929–2011), international strategic affairs analyst, journalist and former Indian civil servant
- Krishnaswamy Sundarji, PVSM (1930–1999), the Chief of Army Staff of the Indian Army from 1986 to 1988
- Krishnaswamy VijayRaghavan (born 1954), professor and former director of The National Centre for Biological Sciences
- Krishnaswamy Natarajan (born 1961), Director General of the Indian Coast Guard

== See also ==
- A. T. Krishnaswamy, 1941 Tamil comedy film
- Evoor Major Sri krishnaswamy temple, Krishna temple in Evoor near Haripad, Alappuzha, Kerala, India
- Chittoor Sree Krishnaswamy Temple, at South Chittoor in the city of Kochi, India, is a temple dedicated to Lord Krishna
- Puthoorppilly Sree Krishnaswamy Temple at Manjapra, a small village in Ernakulam District, Kerala, India
