= M. Prabhakaran =

Indian politician

Member of the Tamil Nadu Legislative Assembly
- Incumbent
- Assumed office 12 May 2021
- Preceded by: R. Thamizhselvan
- Succeeded by: R. Thamizhselvan
- Constituency: Perambalur

Personal details
- Party: Dravida Munnetra Kazhagam

M. Prabhakaran is an Indian politician who is a Member of Legislative Assembly of Tamil Nadu. He was elected from Perambalur as a Dravida Munnetra Kazhagam candidate in 2021.

== Elections contested ==
Election	Constituency	Party	Result	Vote %	Runner-up	Runner-up Party	Runner-up vote %	Ref.
2021 Tamil Nadu Legislative Assembly election	Perambalur	DMK	Won	51.27%	R. Thamizhselvan	AIADMK	38.24%	
2011 Tamil Nadu Legislative Assembly election	Perambalur	DMK	Lost	42.08%	R. Thamizhselvan	AIADMK	52.19%	
