= Namboothiri (disambiguation) =

Namboothiri, or Nambudiri, is a Malayali Brahmin caste in Kerala, India.

Namboothiri may also refer to:

- Namboothiri (artist) (Karuvattu Mana Vasudevan Namboothiri, 1925–2023), Indian painter and sculptor
- Akkitham Achuthan Namboothiri (1926–2020), Indian poet and essayist
- Babu Namboothiri (born 1947), Indian actor
- Chandramana Govindan Namboothiri (fl. 1990s), Indian Kathakali artist
- Cherusseri Namboothiri, 15th-century Malayalam poet
- Kaithapram Damodaran Namboothiri (born 1950), Malayalam writer and musician
- Kaithapram Viswanathan Namboothiri (1963–2021), Indian musician and music director
- M. K. Sankaran Namboothiri (born 1971), Indian singer
- M. V. Vishnu Namboothiri (1939–2019), Indian teacher and author
- Malliyoor Sankaran Namboothiri (1921–2011), Indian Bhagavata scholar
- Mullanezhi (Mullanezhi Neelakandan Namboothiri, 1948–2011), Malayalam writer and actor
- Sreelatha Namboothiri (born 1950), Indian actress and singer
- Unnikrishnan Namboothiri (1923–2021), Indian actor
- Varanasi Vishnu Namboothiri (1937–2020), Indian drummer
- Vazhakkunnam (Vazhakkunnam Neelakandan Namboothiri, 1903–1983), Indian performing magician
- Vishnunarayanan Namboothiri (1939–2021), Indian writer and scholar

== See also ==
- KP Namboodiris, an ayurvedic medicine manufacturing company
- E. M. S. Namboodiripad (1909–1998), Indian politician, former chief minister of Kerala
- K. S. S. Nambooripad (1935–2020), Indian mathematician
