= Thuravoor =

Thuravoor commonly refers to:

- Thuravoor, Cherthala
- Thuravoor, Angamaly
