= Thuravoor, Angamaly =

Thuravoor
- village
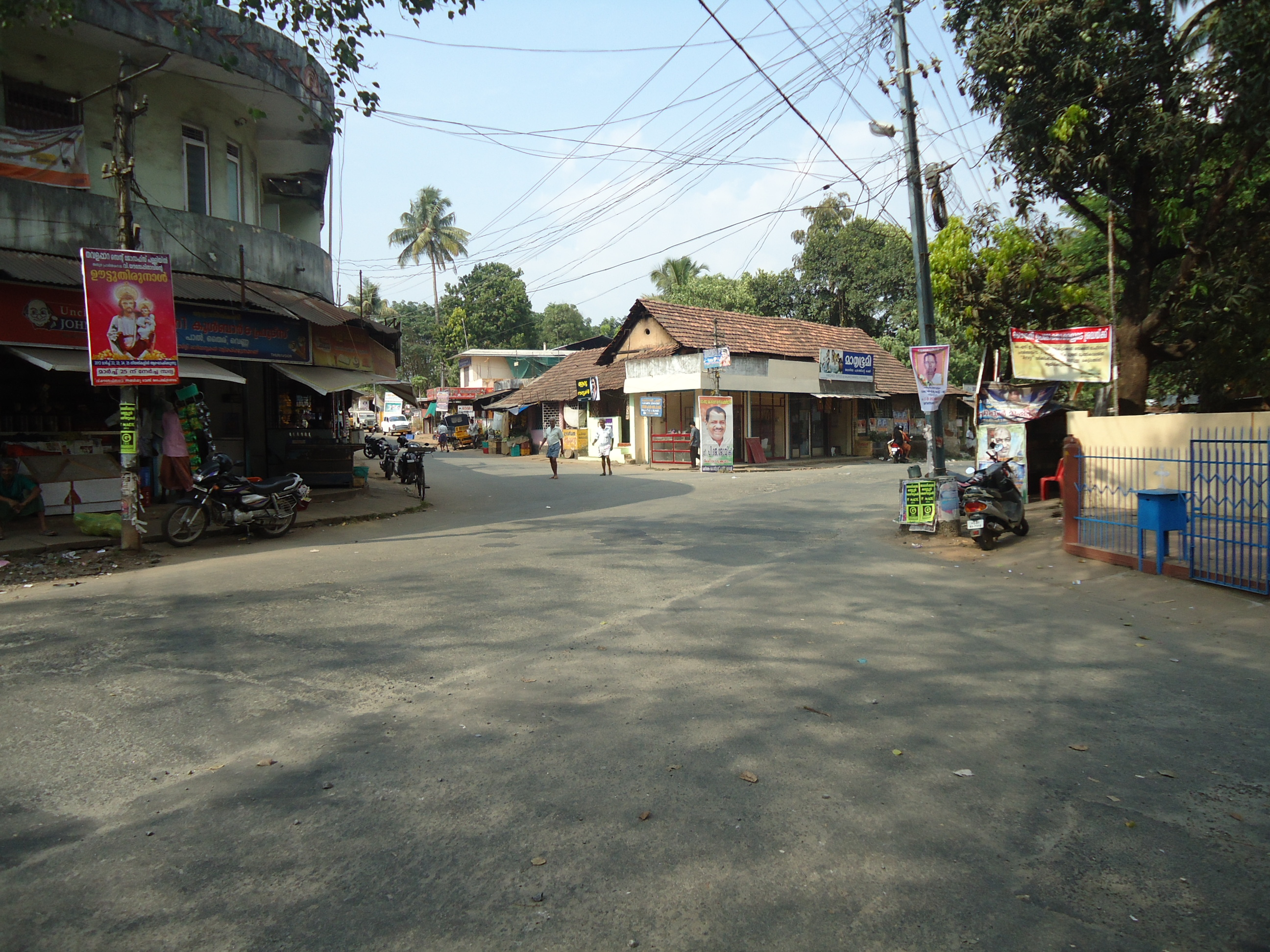
- Interactive map of Thuravoor
- Coordinates: 10.201°N 76.424°E
- Country: India
- State: Kerala
- District: Ernakulam

Government
  - Type: G070302

Area
  - Total: 12.13 km^{2} (4.68 sq mi)

Population (2001)
  - Total: 17,498
  - Density: 1,443/km^{2} (3,736/sq mi)
  - Density: 1,419/km^{2} (3,680/sq mi)

Languages
  - Official: Malayalam
- Time zone: UTC+5:30 (IST)
- PIN: 683572
- Telephone code: 0484
- Vehicle registration: KL-63
- Website: thuravoorpanchayat.com

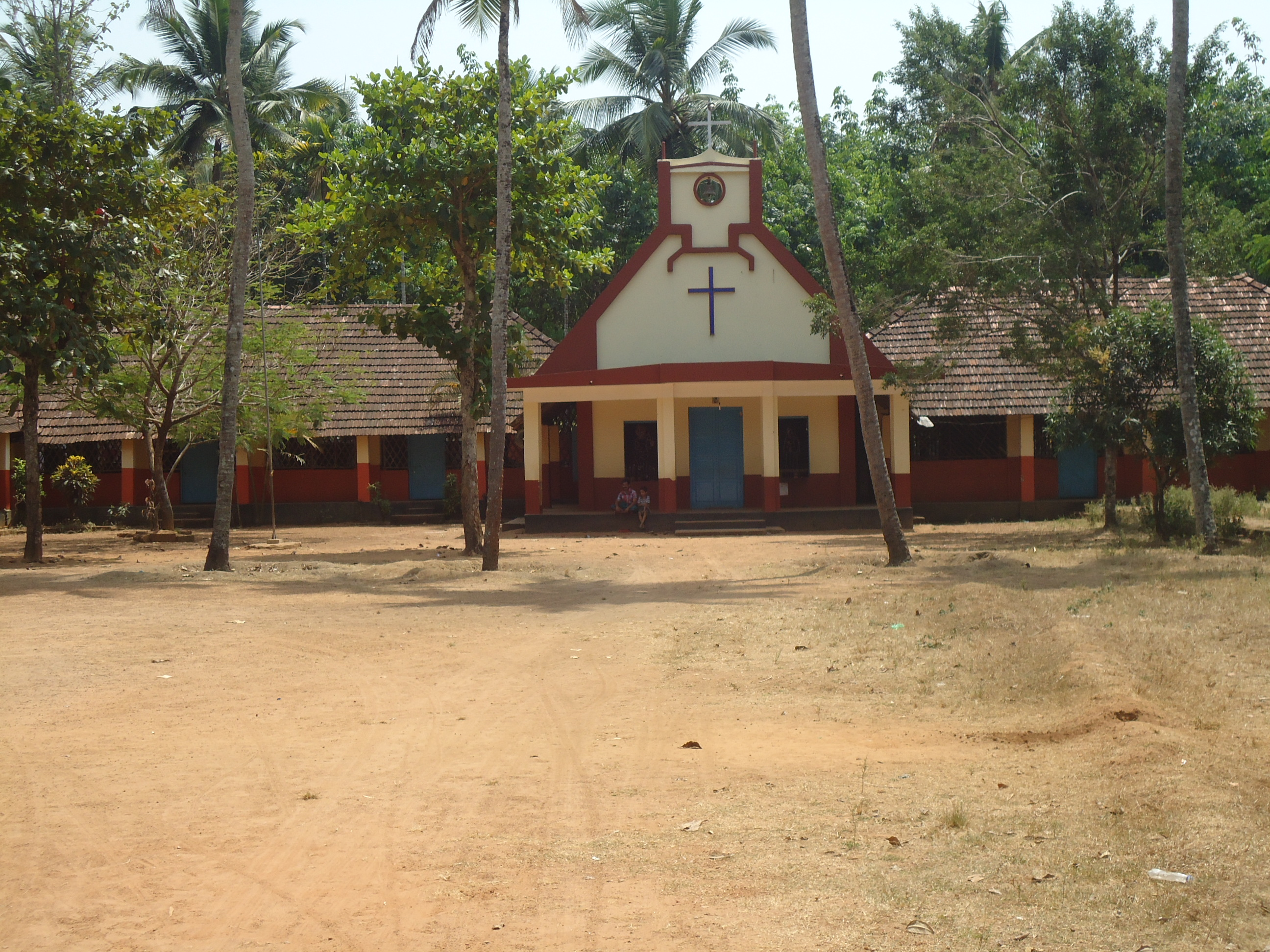
St.Mary's School

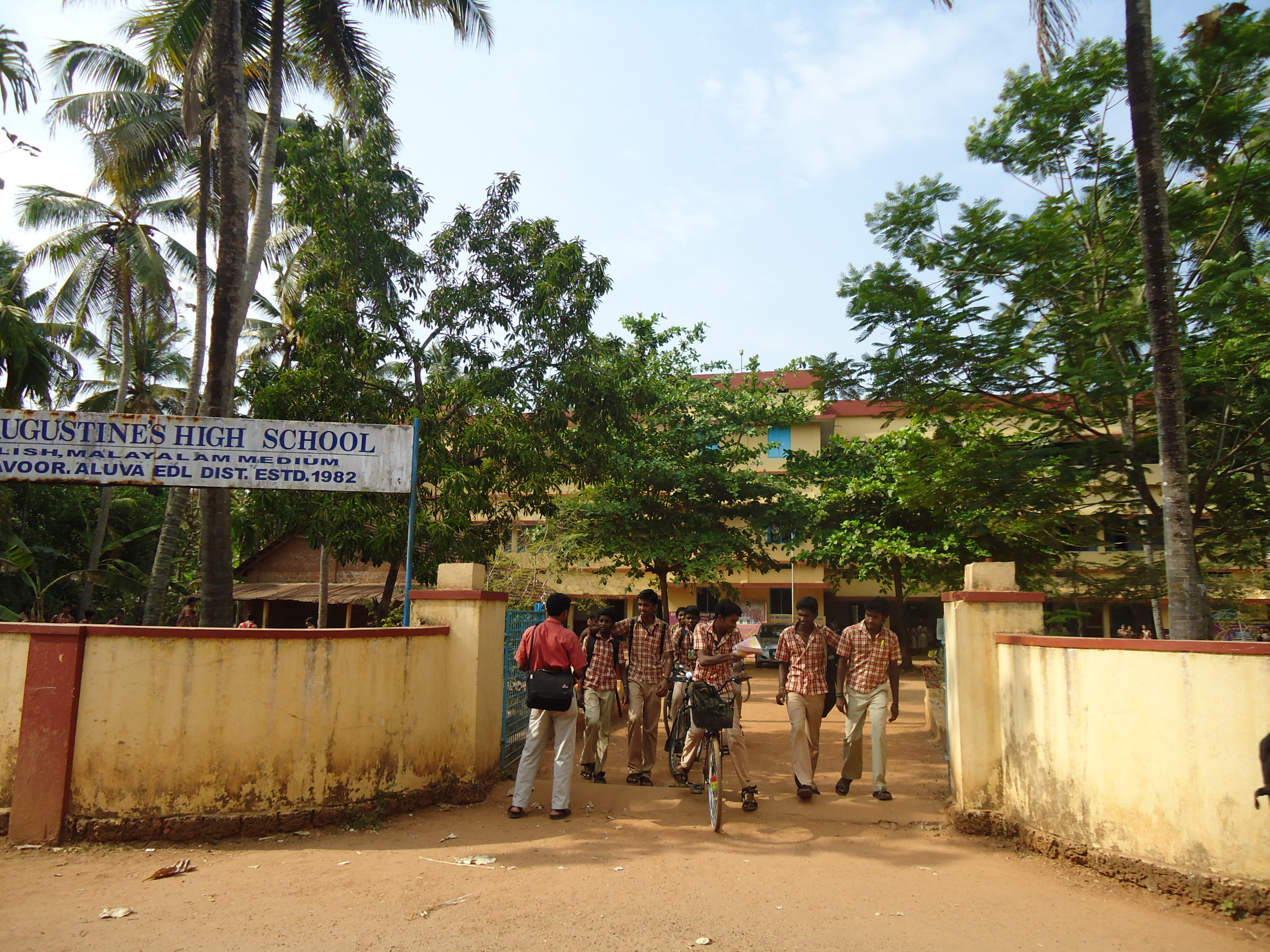
St.Augustine School

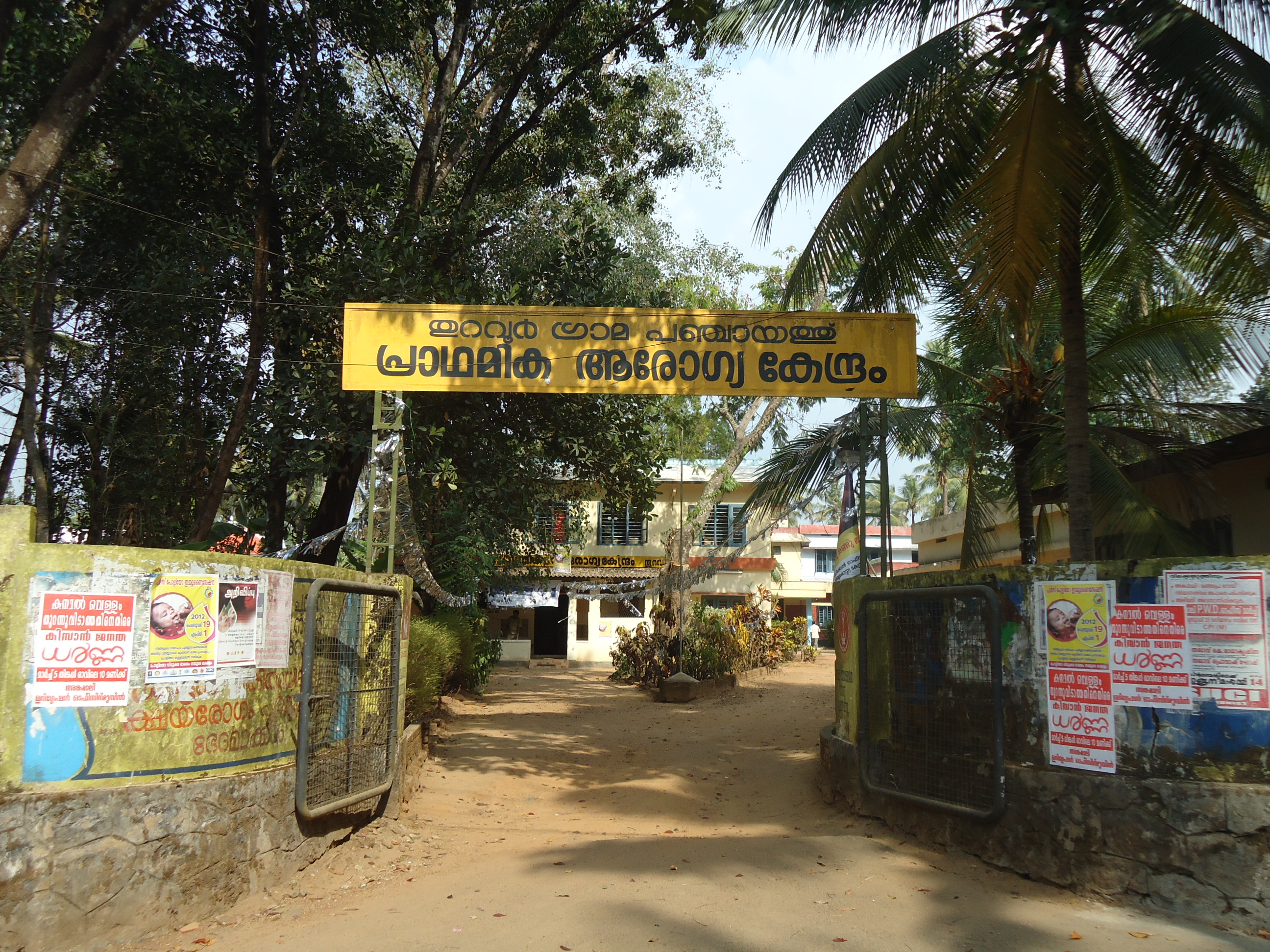
Panchayath Office

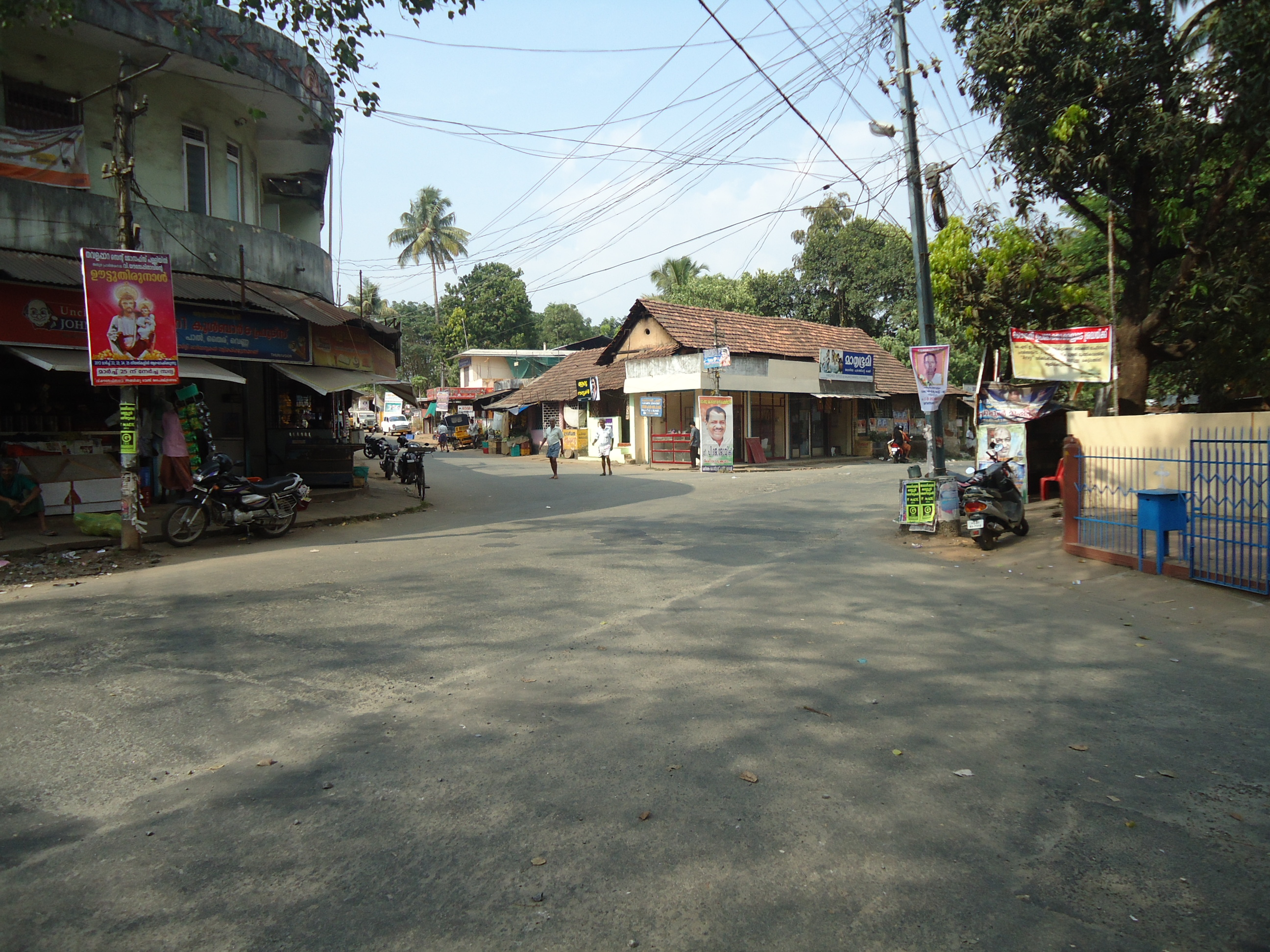
Thuravoor Junction

Thuravoor is a Gram Panchayat in Aluva Taluk of Ernakulam District in the South Indian state of Kerala. Thuravoor Grama Panchayath is nearly 5 km from Angamaly Town. The Panchayat covers 12.13 km^{2} in area. The borders of this panchayat are Mookkannoor and Manjapra Panchayat in the north, Manjapra, Malayattoor-Neeleeswaram Panchayat in the East. Kalady panchayat and Angamaly Municipality in the south, and Karukutty and Mookkannoor Panchayat on the west.

The first President of Thuravoor Panchayat was P.O. Jose. The nearest railway station is Angamaly. Cochin International Airport is situated 8 km from Thuravoor. Angamaly-Manjapra Road and Kalady-Mookkannoor Road are the major roads passing through the panchayat.

Thuravoor has a Panchayat office, primary health center, Krishi Bahavan and electricity office.

== History ==
The name Thuravoor is derived from "the oor of thuras", meaning "the land of small lakes". In ancient times people abandoned the area due to contagious diseases or natural disasters. The place remained as a forest for a long time. In 1930, people found large stone steps at Cheenam Chira along with large mud jars from various parts of Thuravoor to support this historical fact. The main temple of Thuravoor, Kuamarakulam temple, is nearly 1000 years old. St Augustine's UP School was opened in 1921. Mar Augustine High School was established in 1982. The first bus service through Thuravoor panchayat was started in 1953. The areas under Thuravoor Grama Panchayat include Udhupin Kavala, Thalakotaparambu, Vathakad, Kidangoor and areas of Yoodhapuram.

== Agriculture ==
Major agricultural products include rice, rubber, coconut, banana and nutmeg.

== Banks ==
- Catholic Syrian Bank thuravoor
- Thuravoor Service Co operative Bank, Thuravoor

== Educational institutions ==
=== Primary schools ===
- Sree Bhadra LP School Kidangoor
- St Mary's LP School Thuravoor
- Little Flowe LPS Vathakkad
- Infant Jesus LPS Kidangoor
- Fathimamatha LPS anappara

=== UP schools ===
- St Augustin's UPS Thuravoor
- Sree Bhadra LP School North Kidangoor

=== High schools ===
- Mar Augustine's HS Thuravoor
- St Joseph HSS Kidangoor

== Temples ==
- Sree Thalakkottuparambilamma Temple
- Sree Komaran Temple
- Kumarakulam Sree Subramanyan Temple
- Kulappurakavu Bhagavathi Temple
- Kavalakattu Siva Temple
- Sree Maha Vishnu Temple Kidangoor
- Sree Kovattu Bhagavathy Temple, Kidangoor
- Vilangappurath Sree Badrakali Temple, Kidangoor
- Sree Subhramanya Swami Temple, Kidangoor
- Sree Puthukulangara Bhagavathi Temple

== Churches ==
- St. Augustine's Church Thuravoor
- St. Sebastine's Church Kidangoor
- Infant Jusus Church, Kidangoor
- Fathima Matha Church, Anappara
- St.john's Baptist church, Yordhanapuram
- Bhatharani church Vathakkad
- St. Sebastine's Church Devagiri
- St:Jude's Roman Catholic Church Yoodhapuram

== Notable people ==
- VT Bhattathirippad – an Indian social critic, well-known dramatist and a prominent freedom fighter
- A P Kurian, Former Speaker – 6th Kerala Legislative Assembly from 15-02-1980 to 01-02-1982

== Transportation ==
- Nearest railway station – Angamaly is 4 km from Thuravoor and major railway station Aluva Railway Station is 19 km away
- Airport – Cochin International Airport at Nedumbassery is 8 km from Thuravoor

== Major Roads ==
- Angamaly-Manjapra Road
- Kalady-Mookkannoor Road

== Politics ==
Currently Thuravoor Panchayath is ruled by the United Democratic Front or (UDF) Led by Indian National Congress (INC) party.(2020 election)

== See also ==
- Kidangoor
- Angamaly
- Manjapra
