= Sakthibhadran =

Indian writer

Śaktibhadra
- Born: between the 7th and 11th centuries Chengannur, Kerala
- Died: Unknown
- Occupation: Playwright
- Writing career
- Genre: Sanskrit drama
- Subject: Hindu Puranas
- Notable work: Āścarya cūṭhāmaṇi

Sakthibhadran was a Classical Sanskrit writer, who lived in ancient Kerala. He wrote Ascharyachoodamani (Devanāgarī: आश्चर्यचूडामणि ), the first Sanskrit drama from South India. He was born in Chengannur, Kerala between the 7th and 11th centuries.

The Malayalam translation of Ascharyachoodamani was made by the famous Sanskrit scholar Vedashri Parakkode N. V. Nambiathiri.

== Early life ==
A popular tradition current in malabar represents Shaktibhadran as a pupil of Adi Shankaracharya; and if this tradition could be trusted, Adi Shankaracharya saved 'Ascharyachoodamani' from complete loss by reciting it from his memory when the work was accidentally burnt. According to Ascharyachoodamani, he was the first playwright of South India and also wrote the play named 'Unmadavasavadatta' on popular story of King Vatsaraj.

== Story of Ascharyachudamani ==
- First Act - In first Act stage-manager give introduction of play. Play start with Lakshman who made hut for his brother and wife sita. Surpanakha disguised as a beautiful woman meet Lakshman and request him to marry her; but Lakshman refused and went to hut. Rama and sita praise Lakshman for making such a beautiful hut.
- Second Act - surpanakha requested rama for marriage but rama refused and asked to meet Lakshman so angry surpanakha in take her real horror form try to abduct Lakshman but Lakshman cut her ears and nose.
- Third Act - In this Act, sages give magical ring to Rama and chudamani (hairpin) to sita. Ravana, A demon-king and brother of surpanakha take help of maricha who take magical form. Ravana disguised as rama meet sita; charioteer of ravana disguised as Lakshman so sita went with them. Surpanakha disguised as sita meet rama and Maricha disguised as Rama meet Lakshman.
- Fourth act - In this Act, surpanakha who disguised as sita meet rama and Converse with him but when magical ring of Rama touched sita; she take his original form of surpanakha. Surpanakha tell rama it's all plan of ravana to abduct sita. Ravana who abducted sita disguised as rama touch sita's magical chudamani (hairpin) and take his real form. jatayu, a vulture try to help sita but ravana kill him.
- Fifth Act - Mandodari learns that Ravana arranged vasantotsav (festival of spring) for sita but Sita doesn't like this and ravana tries to convince her but she refuses.
- Sixth Act - Hanuman meet sita in Ashokavana and give ring of Rama. he also give message of Rama. Sita give his chudamani as sign to Hanuman.
- Seventh Act - Vidyadhara and his wife tell fighting between ravana and Rama. Rama defeat Ravana. Finally Rama meet sita who wear beautiful ornaments so Rama makes Sita undergo a trial by fire to prove her chastity. Narada tell secret that Anasuya give magical ornaments to sita so she look beautiful. Finally Rama went Ayodhya with sita and Lakshman.
