= Krishnasamy =

Krishnasamy is a given name and surname. Notable people with the surname include:

- Ahora Murthi Krishnasamy (c. 1949–1973), Singaporean murder victim
- Arsan Krishnasamy Govindarajoo, Singaporean man and perpetrator in the Murder of Wan Cheon Kem
- Devamany S. Krishnasamy (born 1958), Malaysian politician
- E. V. K. Sampath (born Erode Venkatappa Krishnasamy Sampath; 1926–1977), Indian politician
- G. Krishnasamy Naidu (born 1961), Singaporean man and perpetrator in the murder of Chitrabathy Narayanasamy
- K. Krishnasamy (born 1952), Indian physician, social worker and politician
- K. Veeramani (born Krishnasamy Veeramani; 1933), Indian politician
- K. Rajagopal (footballer) (born Rajagopal Krishnasamy; 1955), Malaysian footballer and coach
- M. Krishnasamy, Indian politician
- Packiria Pillai Krishnasamy (1910–1984), Singaporean murder victim
- R. Krishnasamy Naidu (1902–1973), Indian politician
- S. Krishnasamy (1946–2008), Malaysian politician
- Sangeeta Krishnasamy, Malaysian actress and model
- Sakthi T. K. Krishnasamy (1913–1987), Indian writer
- V. Krishnasamy (1948–2020), Malaysian footballer
- V. R. Krishnasamy, Indian politician

== See also ==
- Krishnaswamy
