= Evoor Major Sri Krishnaswamy Temple =

Hindu temple in Kerala, India

Evoor Sri krishnaswamy temple
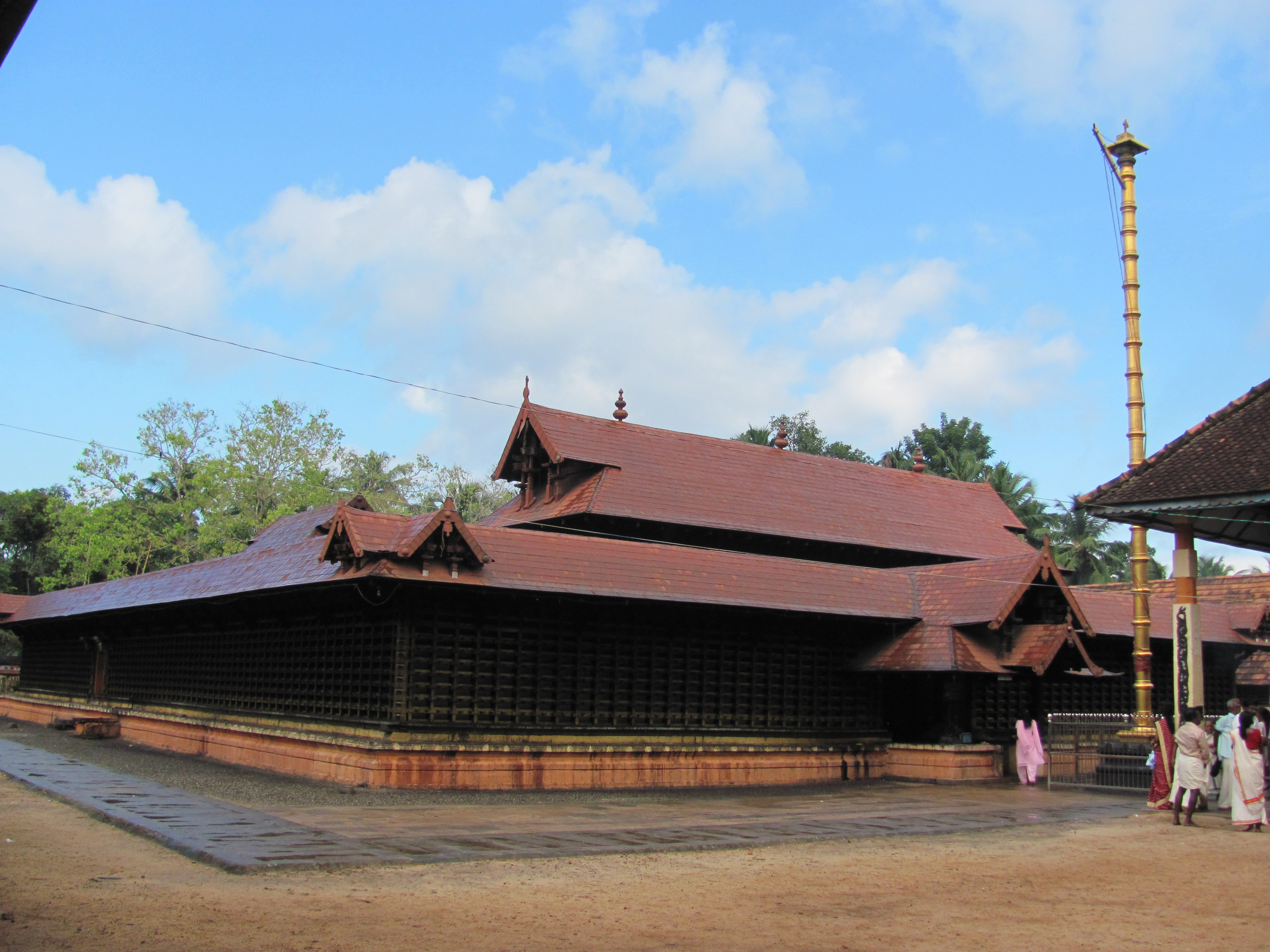

- Location in Kerala

Religion
- Affiliation: Hinduism
- District: Alappuzha
- Deity: Sri Krishna(Prayoga Chakra Prathishta)
- Festivals: Evoor Makara Ulsavam, Krishna Janmashtami
- Governing body: Travancore Devaswom Board

Location
- Location: Evoor, Haripad
- State: Kerala
- Country: India
- Coordinates: 9.2305°N 76.4818°E

Architecture
- Type: Traditional Kerala style
- Creator: Moolam Thirunal - Current structure
- Established: Five Millennium Ago - During Khandava Dahanam
- Completed: 19th century

Evoor Major Srikrishnaswamy temple is a Krishna temple in Evoor near Haripad, in Alappuzha, Kerala. It is said to have originated five millennium ago following Khandava Dahanam. Temple in its current form is built by Moolam Thirunal.

== Mahabharata Legend ==
Agni, after devouring clarified butter uninterrupted for twelve years from Swetaki's Yagja, suffered a stomach ailment. Lord Brahma advised him to consume the Khandava forest. The forest was abode to Takshaka, the Naga leader and friend of Indra. Whenever Agni tried to consume the forest Indra, with his thundershowers, stopped him. Agni turned to Arjuna and Krishna for assistance. Agni armed Arjuna with the mighty bow Gandiva which rivalled Pinaka, the bow of Lord Shiva himself. When Arjuna and Krishna arrived at Khandava forest Kanva Maharishi approached them with a request to spare his Arca moorthy (a four handed idol of Vishnu) Krishna granted the request. Arjuna constructed a Sarakoodam to shelter Agni. Under the Sarakoodam Agni consumed the forest and was cured of the ailment. Grateful, Agni, expressed his wish to install Arca moorthy in a new temple there to facilitate worship. As instructed by Sri Krishna, Arjuna fired an arrow to determine an auspicious location for the proposed temple. The place where the arrow landed was used to construct the new temple. Evoor is a corrupt form of Eythoor (place where arrow was shot). Krishna performed Prana-Pratishta and Arjuna performed the first pooja. Bhoothanathaswamy( Kiratha Murthy form of Lord Shiva) and Yakshi Amma ( Devi Parvathy) were consecrated as the Sub Deities. The remains of burned trees in the locality and names of nearby places, Karippuzha (kari means char), Pathiyoor (corruption of Kathiya Oor-place that burnt), Pandavarkavu, Mannarasala, Kannamangalam (Kanva-Mangalam Kanva's abode) agree with the account.

== Fire and Reconstruction ==
About one and a half century ago the temple burnt when the sanctum santorum caught fire. The idol was recovered from the burning temple. The then King Moolam Thirunal who was visiting Kashi had a vision in his dream asking him to reconstruct the temple. He returned right away and constructed a new temple.

== Deity ==
Evoor Bhagavan's Deity is the unique Prayoga Chakra Prathishta. The idol of Sri Krishna is in the four armed Vishnu form with Panchajanya Shankha, Sudarshana Chakra and butter in three hands and the fourth arm held on hip. The deity is furious form and Raktha-pushpanjali is a special offering here which is unavailable in Vishnu temples elsewhere.

== Makara Ulsava ==
Ulsava in Evoor temple starts on first day of makara and continues for ten days. The ulsava begins with the hosting of Garuda printed flag. The ulsava of days 7, 8, and 9 are sponsored by three karas one at a time. On the ninth day there is Kala-kettu (decorated effigies of Bulls). The ulsava culminates with Aaraattu (holy bath) after that the flag is lowered and the deity proceeds to Pallikkuruppu (Holy Sleep).

== See also ==
- Temples of Kerala
- Temple festivals of Kerala
