= K. Sivakumar (politician) =

Indian politician (born 1985)

Krishnan Sivakumar (born 1985) is an Indian politician from Tamil Nadu. He is a member of the Tamil Nadu Legislative Assembly from the Perambalur Assembly constituency, which is reserved for Scheduled Caste community in Perambalur district, representing the Tamilaga Vettri Kazhagam.

Sivakumar is from Perambalur, Perambalur district, Tamil Nadu. He is the son of Krishnan. He studied at the Government Higher Secondary School, Perambalur, and completed his Class 12 examinations in 1997. He is self employed and declared assets worth Rs.1.9 lakhs in his affidavit to the Election Commission of India.

== Career ==
Sivakumar became and MLA for the first time winning the Perambalur Assembly constituency representing the Tamilaga Vettri Kazhagam in the 2026 Tamil Nadu Legislative Assembly election. He polled 90,882votes and defeated his nearest rival, S. T. Jayalakshmi of the Dravida Munnetra Kazhagam, by a margin of 14,393 votes.
