= J. S. Raju =

Indian politician

J. S. Raju was an Indian politician and former Member of the Legislative Assembly of Tamil Nadu. He was elected to the Tamil Nadu legislative assembly as a Dravida Munnetra Kazhagam candidate from Perambalur constituency in the 1967, 1971 and 1980 elections.
