= M. Devarajan =

Indian politician

M. Devarajan is an Indian politician and former Member of the Legislative Assembly of Tamil Nadu. He was elected to the Tamil Nadu legislative assembly as a Dravida Munnetra Kazhagam candidate from Perambalur constituency in the 1996 election. The constituency was reserved for candidates from the Scheduled Castes.
