= Evoor =

Village in Alappuzha District, Kerala, India

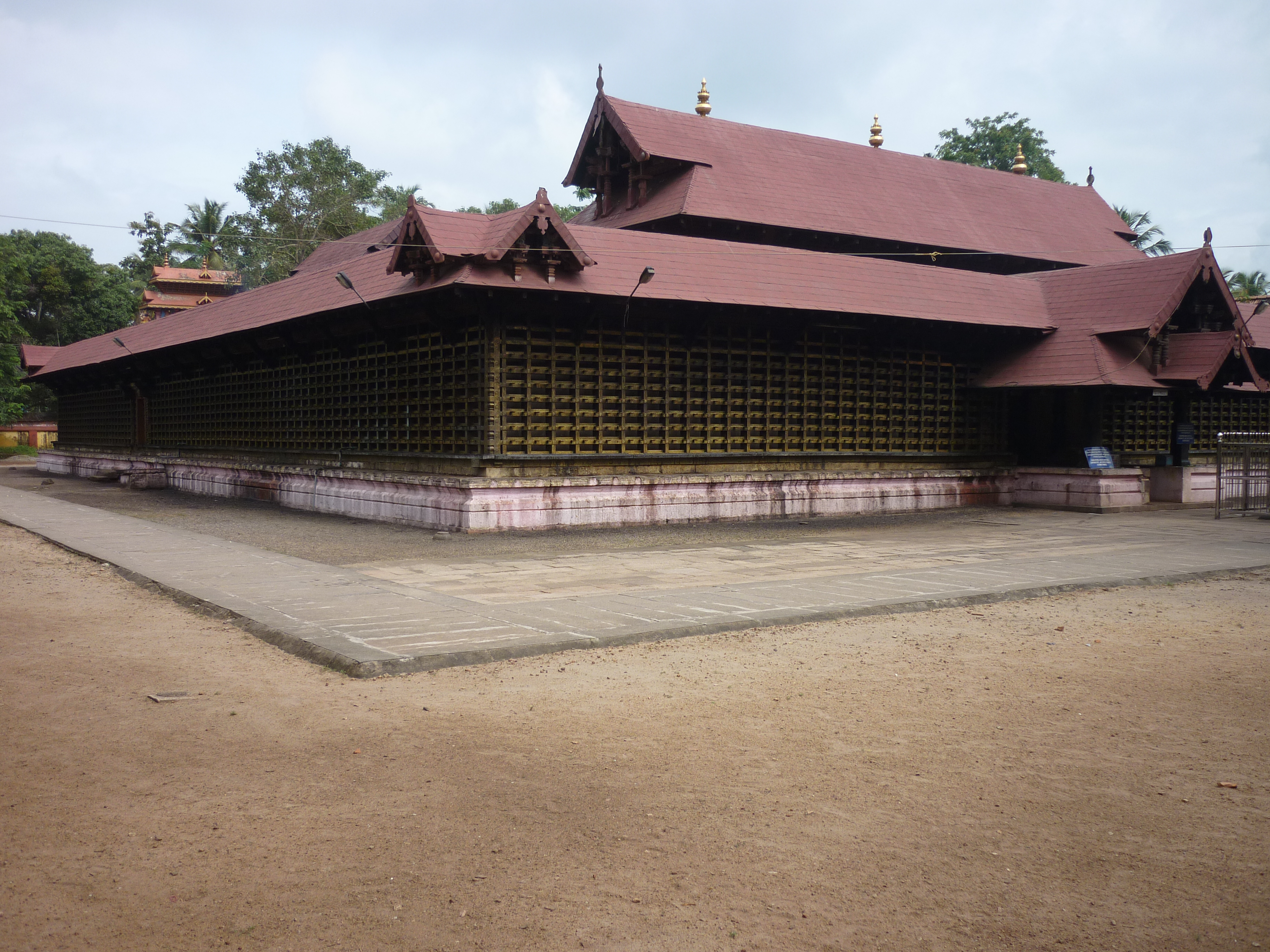
Evoor Temple

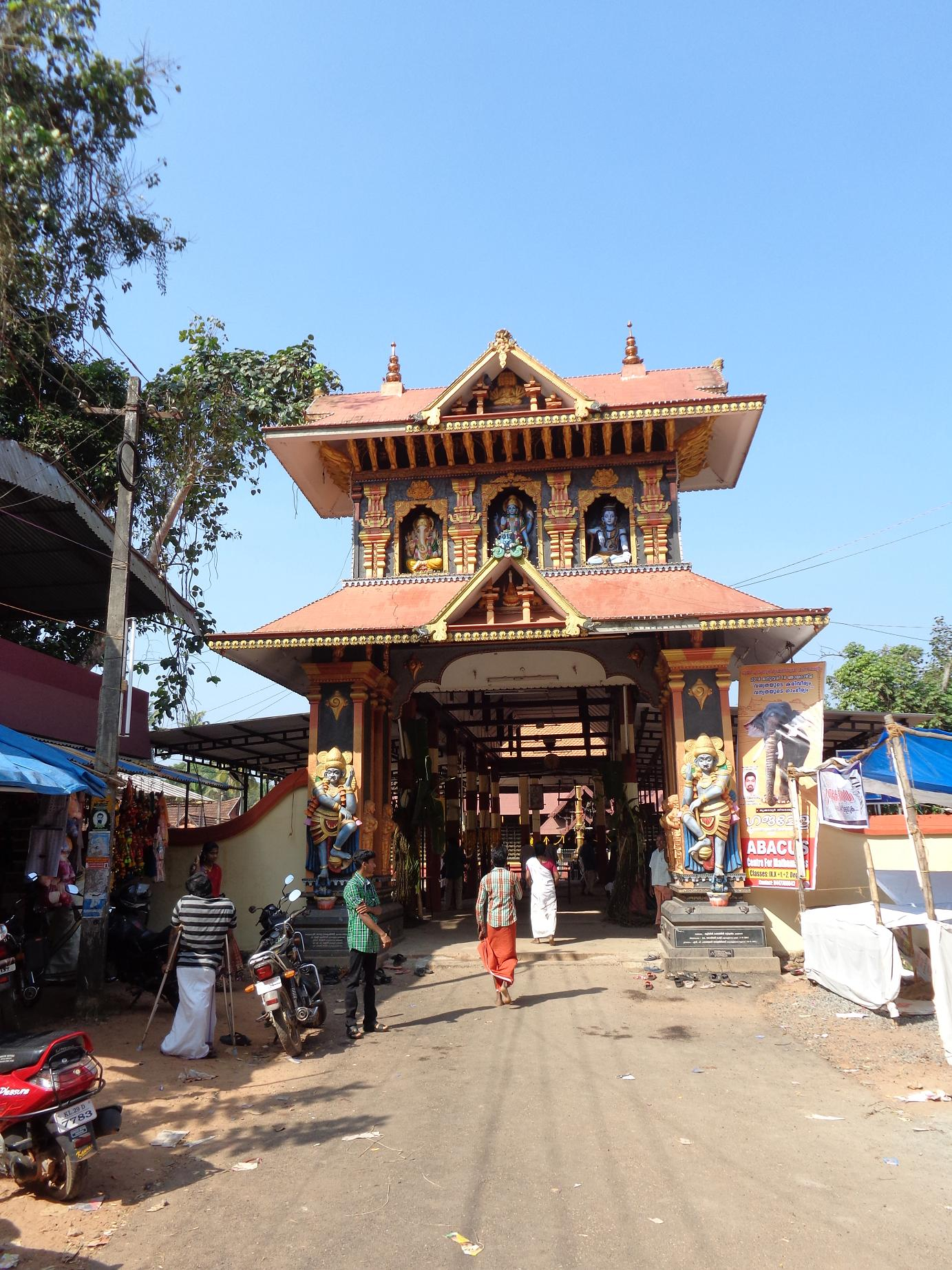
Temple Gopuram

Evoor is a village located by the side of NH66 near Haripad in Karthikappally taluk, Alappuzha district.

== Location ==
Almost midway between Thiruvananthapuram and Kochi, it is located forty kilometers south of Alappuzha in the Onattukara area next to Cheppad railway station. The area is geographically divided into North, South and East. Evoor is bound by Ramapuram on the west, Cheppad on the north, Pathiyoor on the south and the wetland Puncha on the East.

== Transportation ==
The Kayamkulam–Ernakulam coastal railway line passes through the entire length of the village.

== Climate ==
The climate is tropical wet with heavy rains during the monsoons. The topography of the land is plain with white sea sand.

== Places of worship ==
A temple dedicated to Lord Krishna is located in the heart of the village. Every year, people flock to the temple to watch the splendid colours of various horses made of wood and elephants that are part of the event. It is a spectacular scene when the elephant with a specially crafted idol placed on top of it slowly comes out of the temple. People cheer and sing songs to praise the deity. People keep singing the song, which is sung in a special way, until they reach their destination. The custom is that the three elephants, one of them carrying the idol, goes to a different temple located a couple of miles away from the main temple. There, the priest does pujas (in Hinduism, the priests do various pujas to evoke the Lord and satisfy the lord. It is a form of priestcraft) and afterwards the group of elephants and the accompanying people singing the songs begin their return journey. It is interesting to note that there is a peculiar event takes place after the priest done with his work. Some people, only with towels wrapped around their waist, roll on their back around the main temple. It is believed that people do it as a penance for the sins they have done last year.

Evoor temple is also famous for Kathakali(a form of Indian classical dance). Kathakali has been in practice in the temple for centuries. The deity faces east and in front of it there is a roofed shelter. It is known as നടപ്പന്തല് (nadapanthal). It is usually here Kathakali takes place. Kathakali has great significance in the temple, as it is believed that if couples who face difficulty in conceiving a child come to the temple and offer a ‘Santhanagopalam’ Kathakali, the lord will bless them with kids. After the birth of the child, the family can visit the temple and watch the kathakali. It is no wonder that the most often played story in the temple is ‘Santhanagopalam’ and there are more than hundreds of ‘Santhanagopalam’ Kathakali takes place every year.

The deity of the temple is in an earnest form. It is believed that the idol was consecrated by the god ‘Agni’(fire).
