= Karppillikkavu Sree Mahadeva Temple =

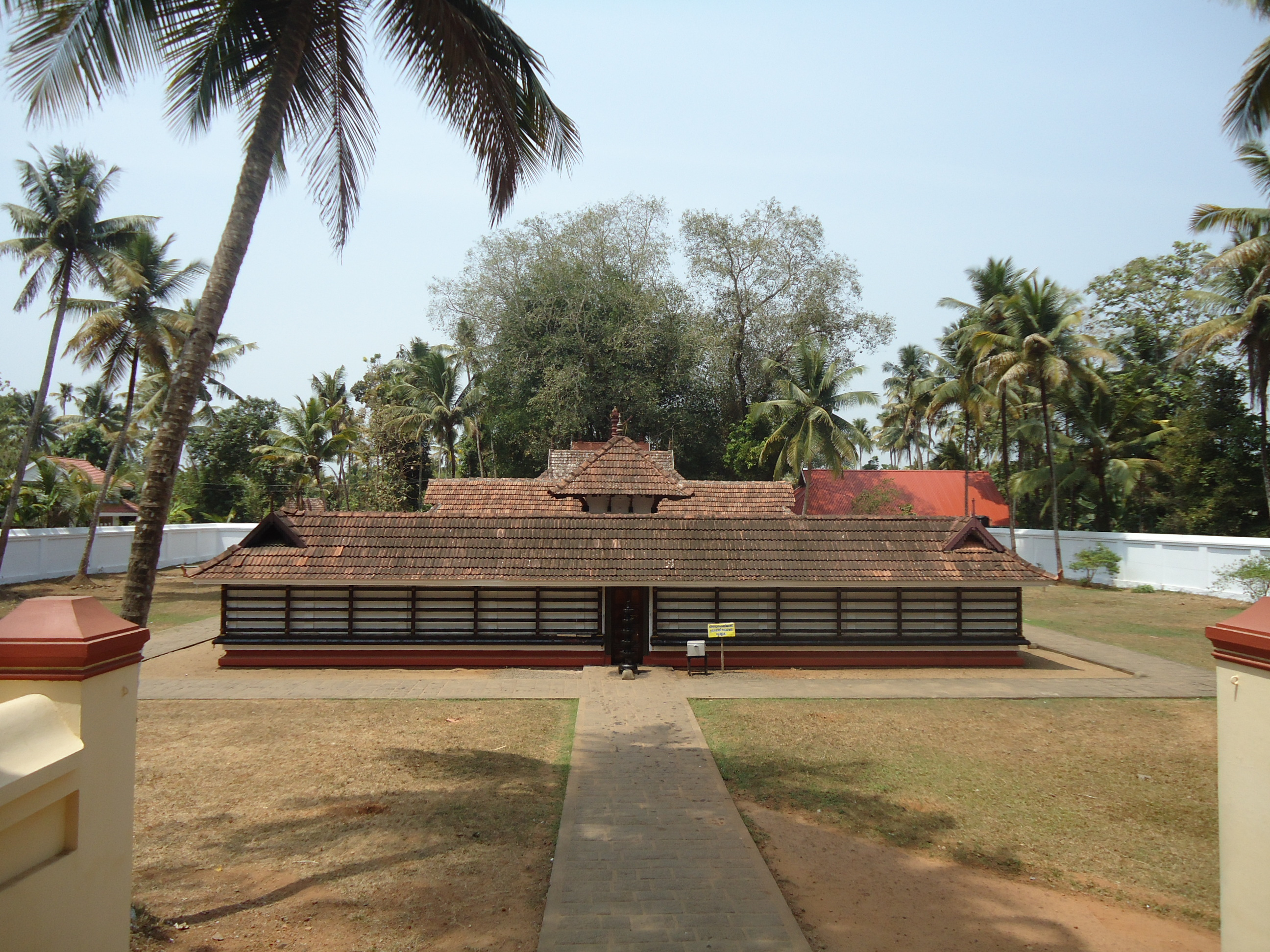
- Karppillikkavu Sree Mahadeva Temple

- Location within Kerala Karppillikkavu Sree Mahadeva Temple (India)

Religion
- Affiliation: Hinduism
- District: Ernakulam
- Deity: Lord Shiva
- Festivals: Main Festival, Shivaratri

Location
- Location: Manjapra
- State: Kerala
- Country: India
- Coordinates: 10°12′7.72″N 76°27′8.92″E

Architecture
- Type: Kerala Traditional

Website
- http://karppillikkavusreemahadevatemple.com

Karppillikkavu Sree Mahadeva Temple is a temple in India, dedicated to Shiva as kirata (hunter). This temple's specialty is that the deity give dharshan to the western side. This temple is situated in Manjapra village in Ernakulam District of the Indian state of Kerala. The deity of Siva is in the Sankalppa of Kirathamoorthy that is Vettakkaran. The legend is that Prathishta was done by Kartavirya Arjuna.

== Legend ==
The legend that this temple had the prathishta of Sri Devi (Parvathy), but when Karthyaveerarjuna came to temple to do dharshan of Sri Devi's sannidhaya was not there and so he conducted Prathishta of Siva in the temple. He stayed in the cave constructed by him in the northern side of temple and spent much of time doing Siva dhyanam.

In an Ashtamangalaprasna conducted by Daivanjan Kaimukku Parameswaran Nambudiripad, he came to the conclusion a huge tunnel connected the well and the pond of the temple and that this tunnel extends from the pond about 30 k.m east. Aat the end of the tunnel is an old temple and a pond with trees, along with plants of high medicinal value.

== Auspicious days ==
All the pradhosha are important days to the temple, including Thiruvathira day in Dhanu, Sivarahtri, Vidhyarambam, Mandala days and Thiruvathira Nakshthram in Makaram month is the Aarattu day after an 8-day festival.

Festival days are important days during which Siva is joyful and dharshan at that time and kanickka offering before his lotus feet is good for Abhishtasidhi and Aiswaryasidhi. The Vishnu day, Uthram Nakshathram in Medom month is the temple's Prathishta day. Niraputhari and Ramayana Masacharanam are other important occasions and days.

The Festival of the Temple is conducted in a grand style with the co-operation and assistance of Hindus, Christians and Muslims. The focus of this festival is that all persons whether Hindu or others consider it a local festival of all concerned. The festival extends for 8 days. Religious celebrations are carried out in strict thanthric ways. For enjoyment and assembly of all, cultural and other programmes that fit with the Achara of the temple are conducted in the temple. On the 7th day of festival the idol is brought from the temple and accompanied by seven eminent elephants and a well known artist for Panchavadhyam and Chendamelom. The procession goes through Manjapra town and ends back at the temple where the idol is taken in.

On the 6th day of the Utsavabali festival in the temple a majestic event is accompanied by Vadhyamelom, Marappani, Nadaswaram and other temple equipment. Sreeboothabali has importance because it is the pooja feast provided for Bhoothagana that soldiers of Siva along with the feast to Bhoothagana Annadhanam provide to the local assembly. At the time of Utsavabali Kanickka samarppanam offers devotees to the lord to meet expenses of Utsavabali, Utsav as well as celebrations.

Karppillikkavu Pooram is celebrated in association with the annual festival of Karppillikkavu Shri Mahadeva Temple. The temple is one among the 108 eminent Shiva kshetras in India, located at Manjapra village. The presiding deity is Lord Shiva. The festival is held during the Malayalam month of Makaram (January–February) for 8 days.

It is believed that these festival days take place when Shiva is in a pleasant mood and grants all that the devotees ask for. The celebrations are carried out in strict tantric ways. Various cultural programs and other art forms are associated with the festival.

Utsavabali is conducted in the temple on the 6th day. A special ritual called Sreebhootabali is the puja feast provided for the Bhootaganas who are Shiva's soldiers. Assembled devotees are served food. On the 7th day, the idol is brought out from the temple, accompanied by seven eminent caparisoned elephants. To add to the beauty of the procession through town, Panchavadyam and Chendamelam are conducted. The procession ends at the temple when the idol is returned to the temple.
