= R. Thamizhselvan =

Indian politician

R. Thamizhselvan is an Indian politician and incumbent member of the Tamil Nadu Legislative Assembly from the Perambalur constituency. He represents the All India Anna Dravida Munnetra Kazhagam party.
