= Puthoorppilly Sree Krishnaswamy Temple =

Temple in Ernakulam District, Kerala, India

Puthoorppilly Sreekrishna temple
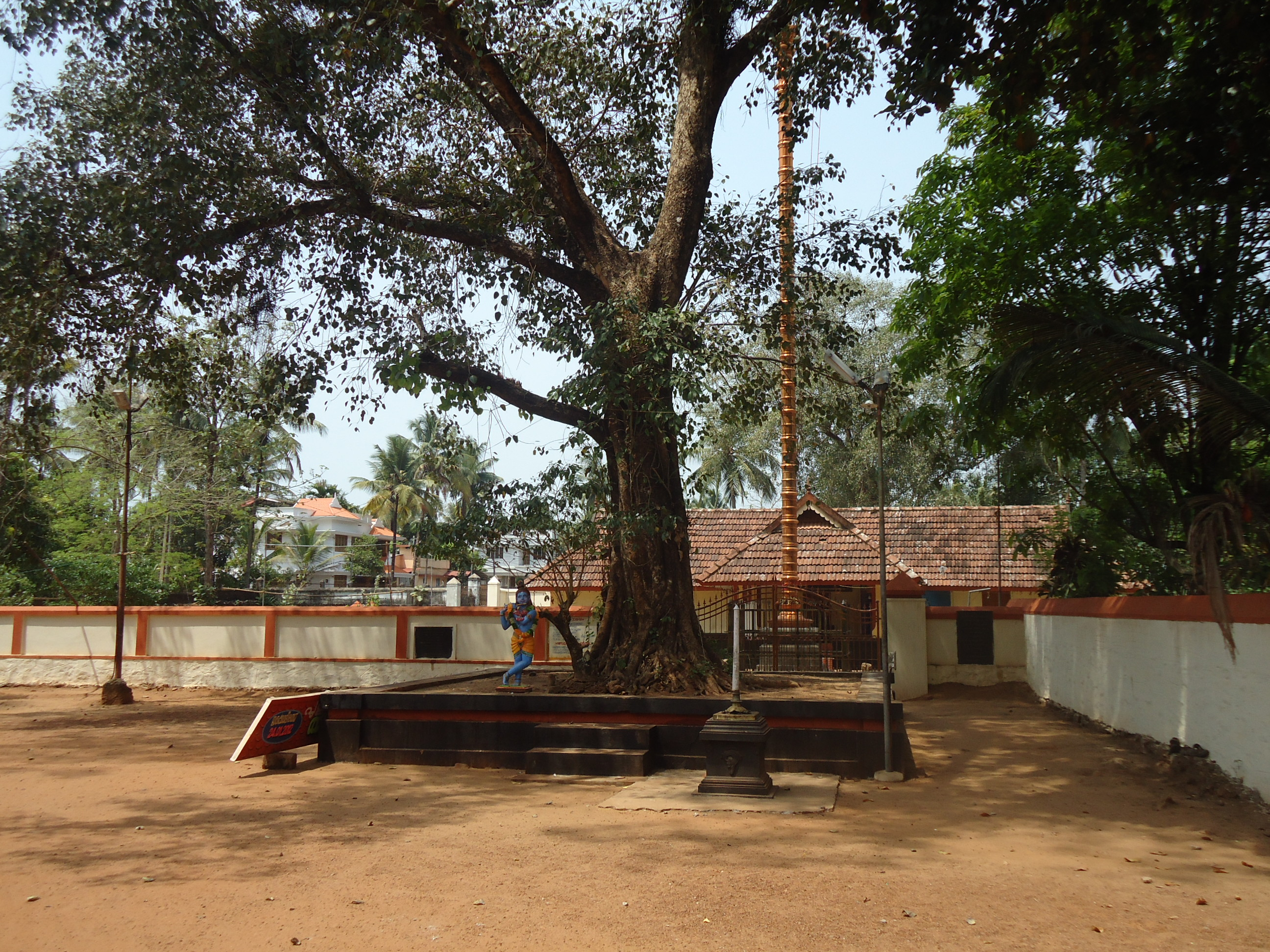
- Entrance of Sree Krishna Temple Majpara

- Location within Kerala

Religion
- Affiliation: Hinduism
- District: Ernakulam
- Deity: Lord Krishna
- Festival: Sreekrishna Jayanthi

Location
- Location: Manjapra
- State: Kerala
- Country: India
- Coordinates: 10°12′50.57″N 76°26′59.02″E

Architecture
- Type: Kerala Traditional

Puthoorppilly Sreekrishna temple is located at Manjapra, a small village in Ernakulam District, Kerala, India. This temple is a protected monument by Archeological Department, Kerala. The deity at this temple is Lord Krishna.

== Gallery ==
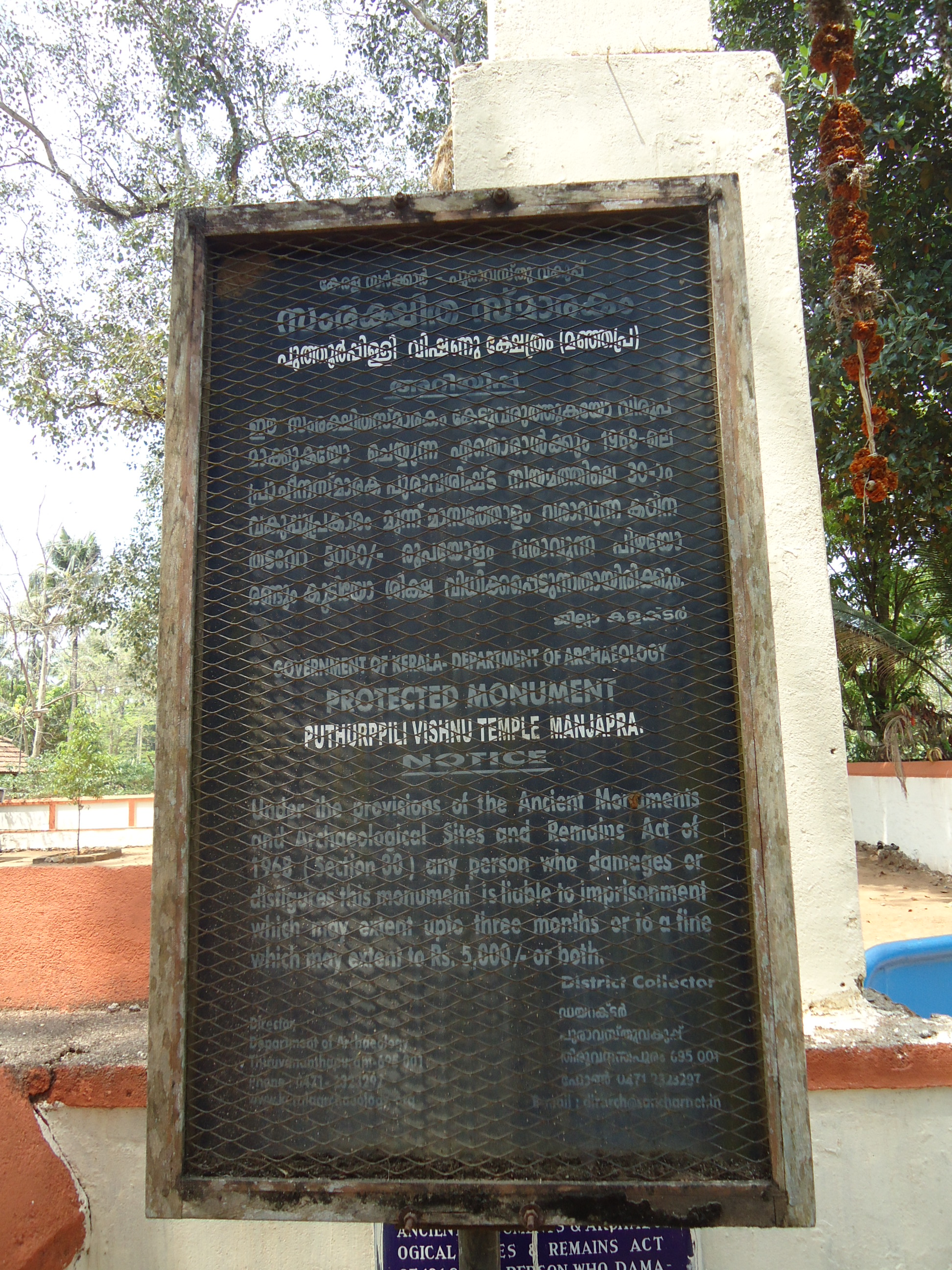
Protected Monument by Archeological Dept, Kerala

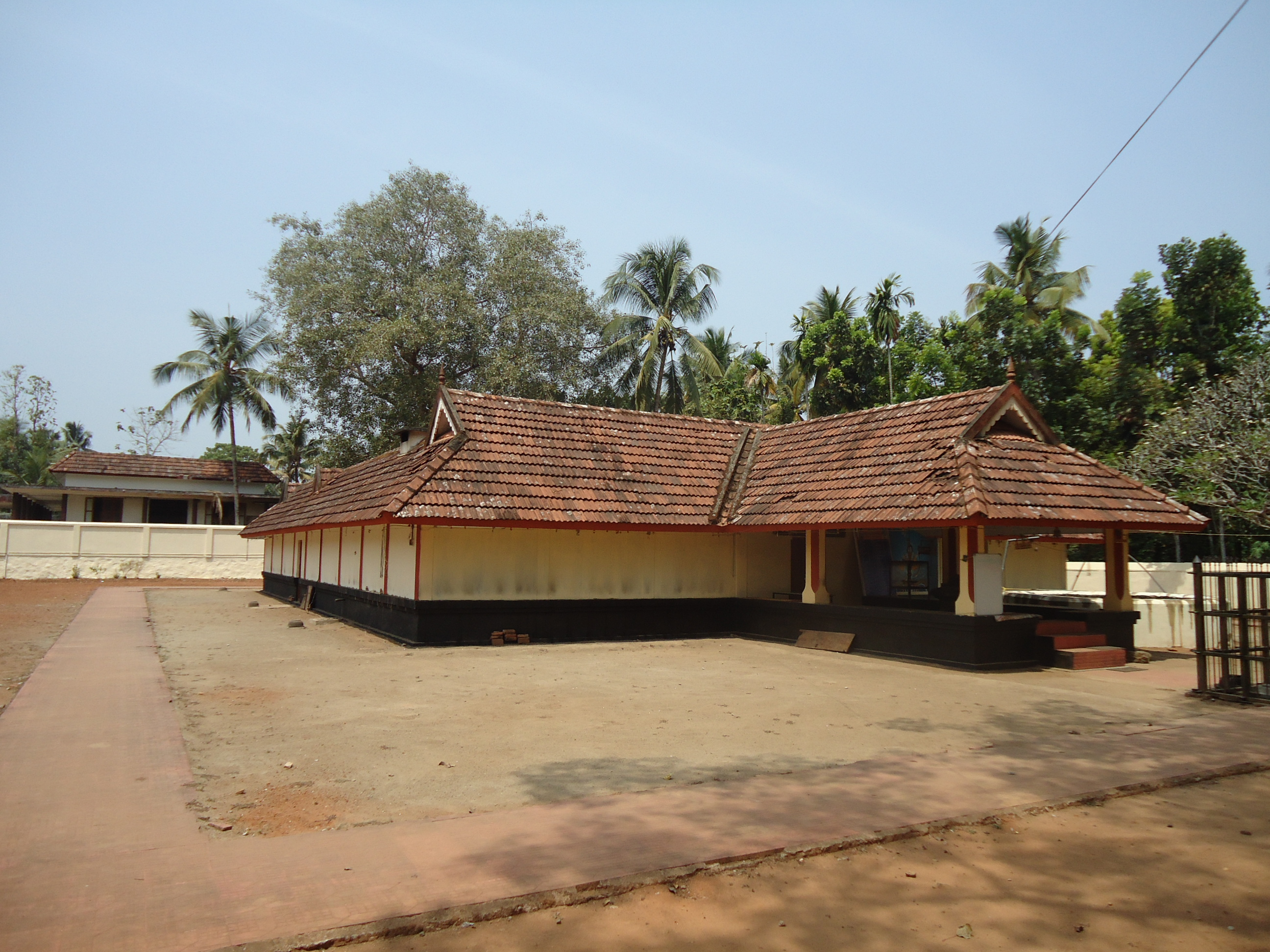
Side View
