= Manjapra =

Village in Kerala, India

- town
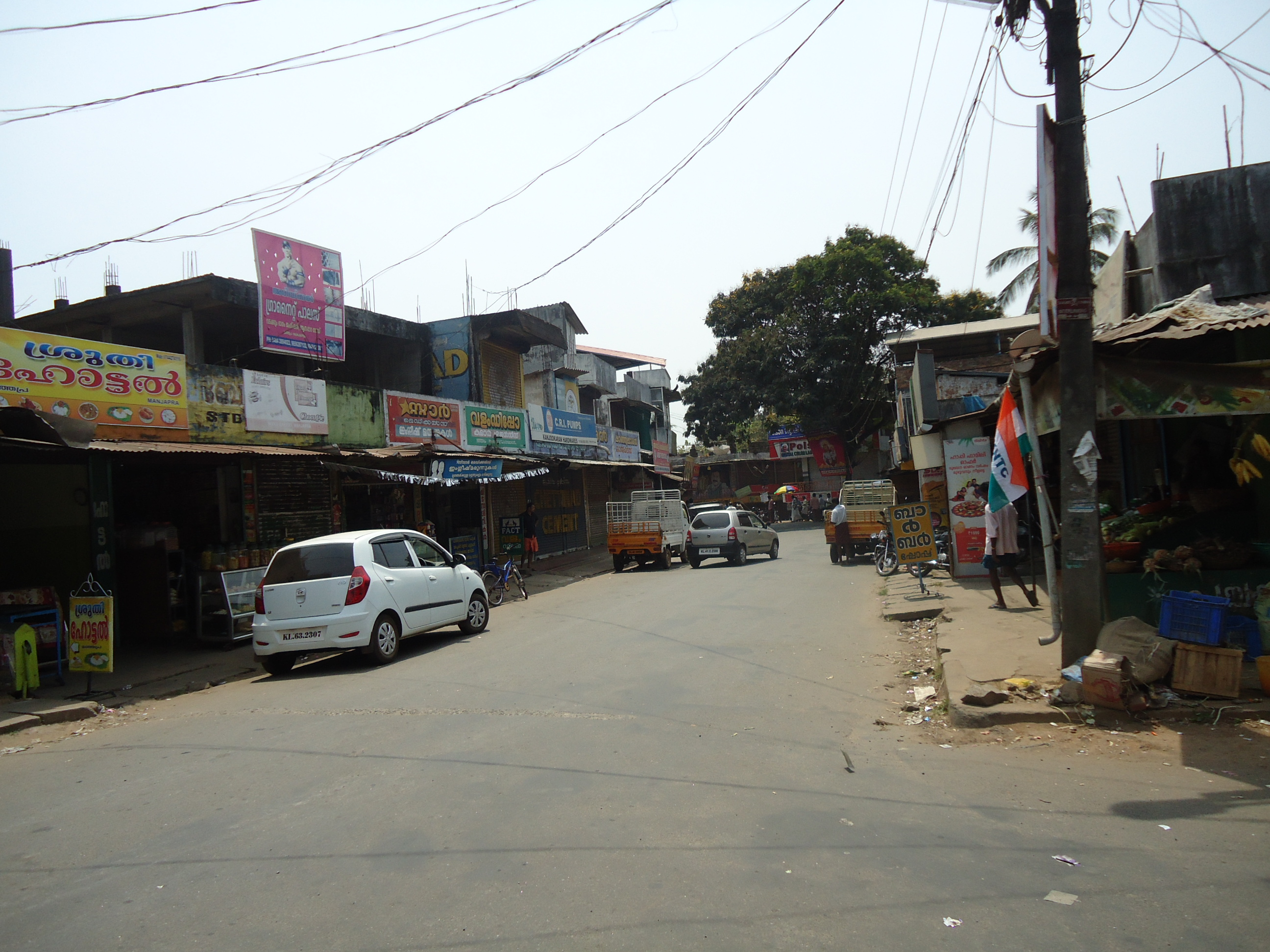
- Manjapra Junction

- Location in Kerala, India Manjapra (India)
- Coordinates: 10°12′30″N 76°27′10″E
- Country: India
- State: Kerala
- District: Ernakulam

Languages
  - Official: Malayalam, English
- Time zone: UTC+5:30 (IST)
- PIN: 683581
- Nearest city: Angamaly
- Lok Sabha constituency: chalakudy

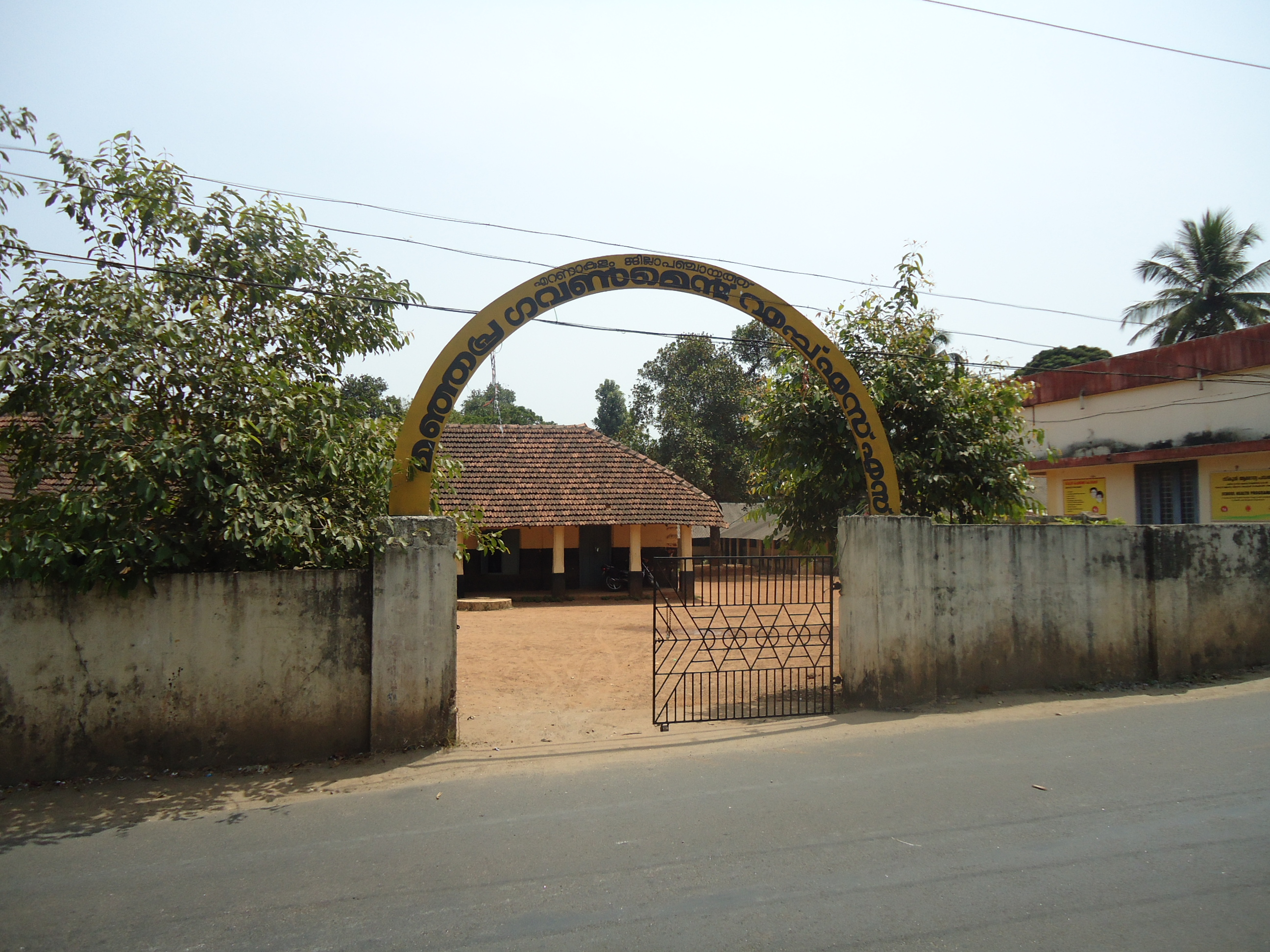
Government School

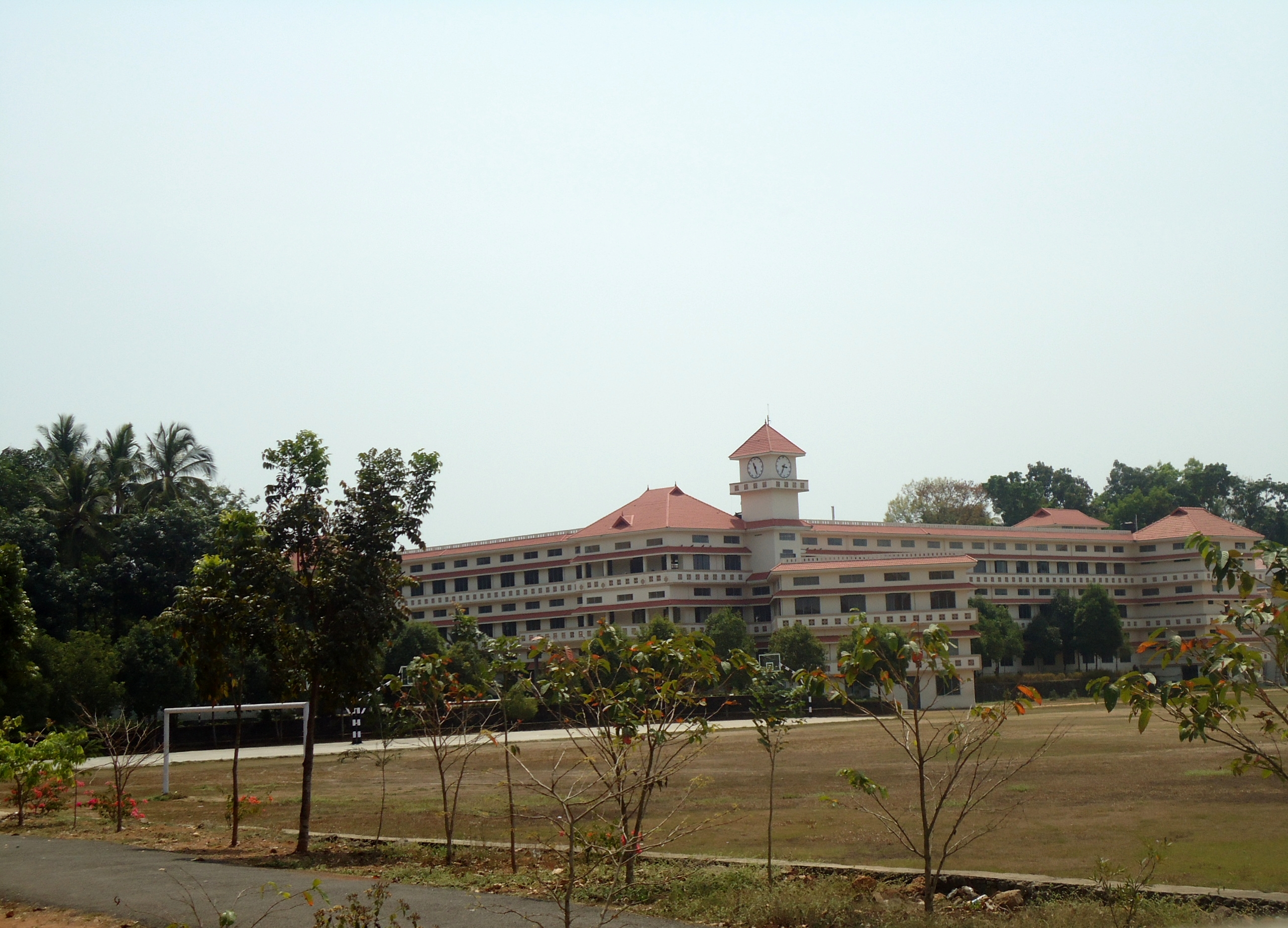
St.Patricks Academy

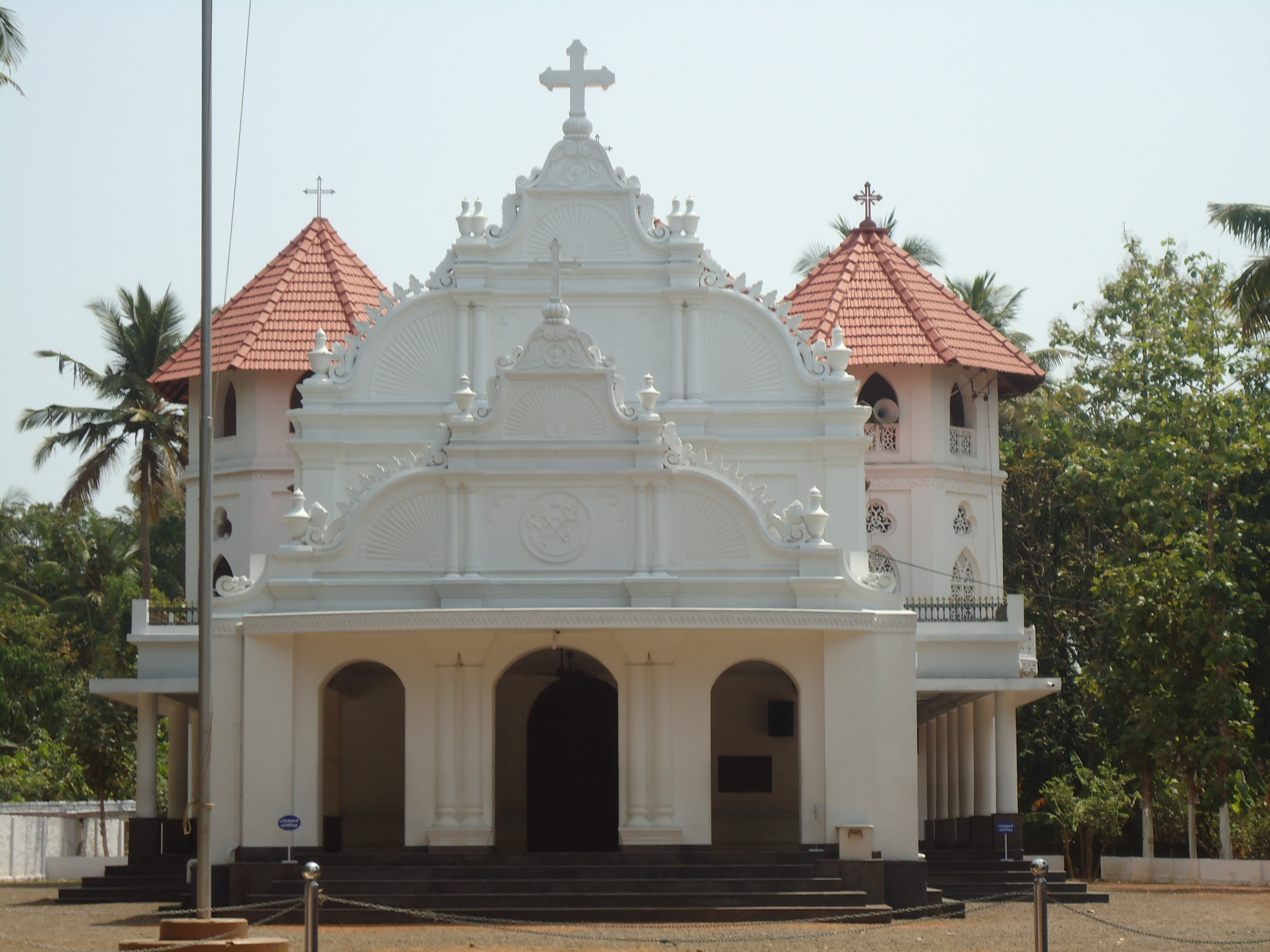
Jacobite Church

Manjapra is a village in the Ernakulam district of Kerala, India. It is located about 10 km from Angamaly and 6 km from Kalady. Chandrappura and Vadakkumbhagom are the main business centers.

If you look at Manjapra from the sky, it looks like an island surrounded by paddy fields on all sides. The unique geographical feature of Manjapra is that all four entry points to this panchayat are from a padam (cultivated paddy field) and stream of water called as Thodu. The first entry point is Kuzhiampadam from Kalady town, the second is Karingallikkadu padam from Angamaly town, the third is Naduthodu from Neeleswaram panchayat and the last is Kothayipadam from Azyampuzha panchayat. Another famous agriculture hub is Mularippadam, near Chandrapura.

Manjapra, known as green village, is very close to the famous Christian pilgrimage centre, Malayattoor, which is one of the few places visited by Saint Thomas, an apostle of Jesus Christ. Also, it is closer to the renowned Sree Sankara Temple, Kalady. Manjapra is renowned for its religious harmony and the people's attitude in celebrating festivals together.

Chandrapura is the main business hub with all the government offices including panchayat, village, electricity office and krishibhavan is located. Manjapra has four major schools (St Marys U.P.S, Government High School, Jyothis Central School and St. Patrick academy) that provide quality education. Traditionally, the people of Manjapra are known for their skill and knowledge in brewing liquor and agriculture products. Quality agriculture products are exported to different parts of the world from this village carrying the brand name of Manjapra. Crops include snake beans, bananas, bitter melon, nutmeg, pepper, tapioca, etc. A majority of the youth from this village works in jobs like IT professionals, nurses, doctors, teachers, technicians, etc. Many workers in Australia, the UK, and the Middle East originate in this village.

- Nearest railway station - Angamaly
- Airport - Cochin International Airport at Nedumbassery is 12 km from Manjapra

== Religious places ==
These are the religious places in Manjapra, Holy Cross Forane Church, Karppillikkavu Sree Mahadeva Temple, St. George Church and Puthoorppilly Sree Krishnaswamy Temple.

Karppillikkavu temple is one of the rare temples in Kerala in which Mahadeva is giving "Darshan" to the west. Puthoorppilly temple is also known as "Kallamabalam" because of its unique architecture where the sanctum sanctorum is made of "Kallu"-Malayalam for stone-. According to legend, this was made by the "Bhuthaganas" of Lord Shiva overnight. The temple is a protected site by the Archaeological Survey of India and managed by the Travancore Devaswom Board.

The main church, Holy Cross Church Manjapra, is another religious site in Ernakulam district in Kerala. The church celebrates the feast "perunnal" of St. Sebastian and St. Mary in the months of January and November annually. It is believed the church was built about 500 years ago [AD 1401] and the monument of this construction is still protected. Sebipuram church situated in the north side of Manjapra, celebrates the feast of St. Sebastian and St. Alphonsa during the months of January and August every year.
