= Malliyoor Sankaran Namboothiri =

Bagavatha Hamsam Brahmasree Malliyoor Sree Sankaran Namboothiri
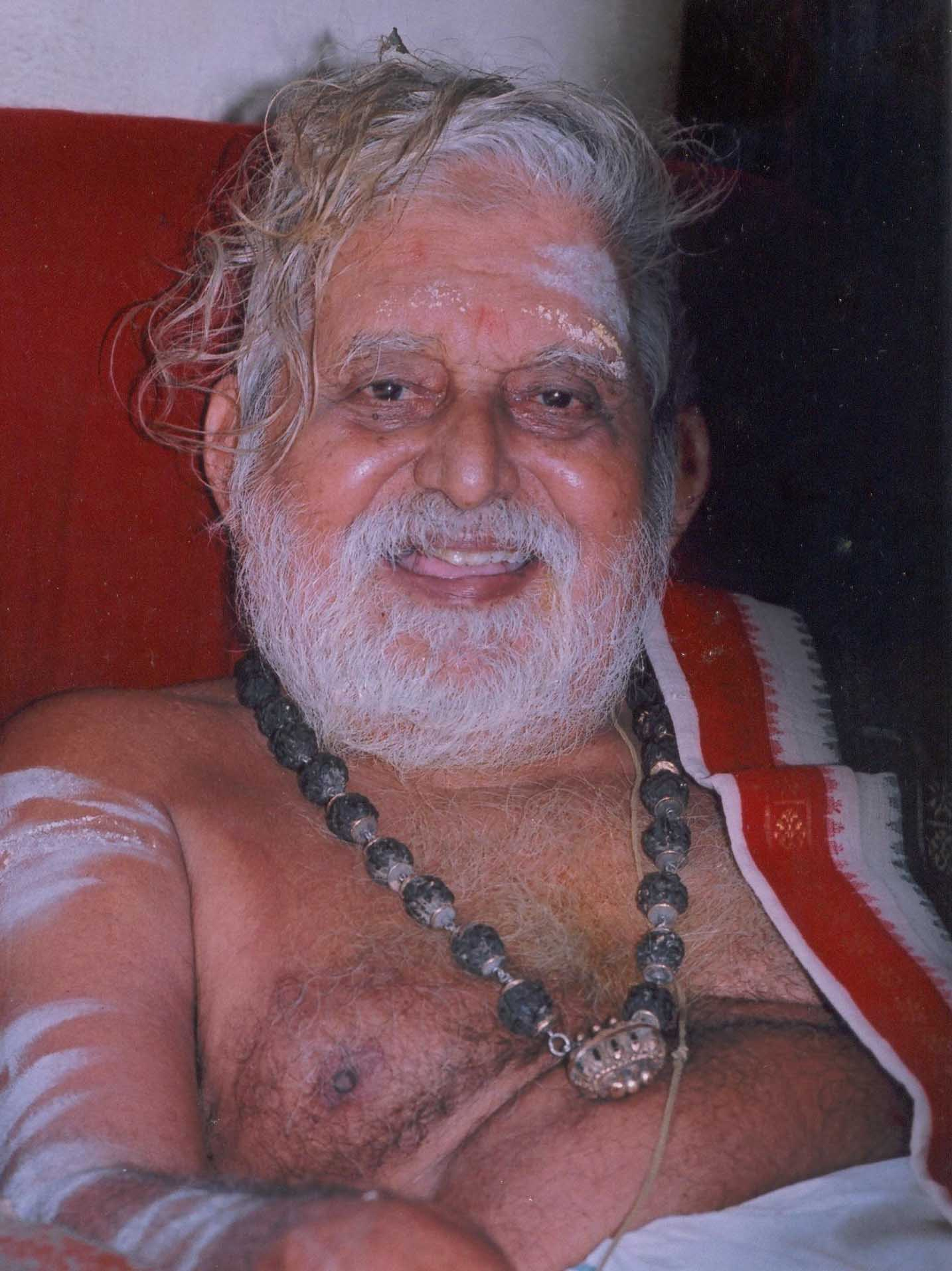
- Born: February 2, 1921; Kuruppanthara, Kottayam, Kerala
- Died: August 2, 2011 (aged 90); Kuruppanthara, Kottayam, Kerala

Bagavatha Hamsam Brahmasree Malliyoor Sree Sankaran Namboothiri (2 February 1921 – 2 August 2011) was a Bhagavata scholar who lived in Kerala.
