= List of State Protected Monuments in Kerala =

This is a list of State Protected Monuments as officially reported by and available through the website of the Archaeological Survey of India in the Indian state Kerala. The monument identifier is a combination of the abbreviation of the subdivision of the list (state, ASI circle) and the numbering as published on the website of the ASI. 116 Kerala State Protected Monuments have been recognized by the Kerala State Department of Archaeology under Kerala Ancient Monuments and Archaeological sites and Remains Act of 1968.

== List of state protected monuments ==
SL. No.	Description	Location	Address	District	Coordinates	Image
S-KL-1	Rock cut cave	Alapuzha		Alapuzha		Upload Photo
S-KL-2	Buddha image "Karumadikuttan"	Karumady	Karumady, Alapuzha	Alapuzha		Buddha image "Karumadikuttan"
S-KL-3	Buddha image	Budha junction	Mavelikara	Alapuzha		Buddha image
S-KL-4	Buddha image			Alapuzha		Upload Photo
S-KL-5	Narasimha temple - Chatankulangara	Chatankulangara		Alapuzha		Upload Photo
S-KL-6	Krishnapuram Palace	Kayamkulam	Krishnapuram	Alapuzha	76°30′31″N 9°09′01″E	Krishnapuram Palace More images
S-KL-7	Karikkodu Annamalanathara temple	Karikkodu		Ernakulam	10°10′07″N 76°14′54″E	Upload Photo
S-KL-8	Stone inscription (Hebrew inscriptions lying in the compound of the snynagogue at Chennamangalam, Paravur)	Chennamangalam, Paravur		Ernakulam	10°10′07″N 76°14′54″E	Upload Photo
S-KL-9	Old Kacherry building (Union Christian College, Aluva)	Aluva, Ernakulam	UC College Rd, Aluva, Kerala 683102	Ernakulam	10°07′33″N 76°20′01″E	Upload Photo
S-KL-10	The palace which was used for performing ceremony of 'Ariyittu Vazcha' by the Maharaja of erstwhile Cochin kingdom	Ernakulam		Ernakulam		The palace which was used for performing ceremony of 'Ariyittu Vazcha' by the Maharaja of erstwhile Cochin kingdom
S-KL-11	Ooramana temple	Ernakulam		Ernakulam		Upload Photo
S-KL-12	Thirunayathodu Siva Narayan Temple	Nayathod		Ernakulam		Thirunayathodu Siva Narayan Temple
S-KL-13	Pallipuram fort	Pallipuram		Ernakulam		Pallipuram fort
S-KL-14	Puthoorppilly Sreekrishnaswamy Temple, Manjapra	Manjapra	Manjapra Church Road, Chandrapura, Manjapra, Kerala 683581	Ernakulam	10°12′52″N 76°27′00″E	Puthoorppilly Sreekrishnaswamy Temple, Manjapra
S-KL-15	Kallil rock cut temple	Perumbavoor	Pulluvazhi Kallil Rd, Methala, Perumbavoor, Kerala 683545	Ernakulam	10°03′57″N 76°32′40″E	Kallil rock cut temple
S-KL-16	Kottayil Kovilakam	Chendamangalam, North Paravur	Kottayilkovilakam, Chendamangalam, Kerala 683521	Ernakulam	10°10′00″N 76°14′57″E	Kottayil Kovilakam
S-KL-17	Vaipikotta Seminary	Ernakulam		Ernakulam		Vaipikotta Seminary
S-KL-18	Stone inscriptions	Ernakulam		Ernakulam		Upload Photo
S-KL-19	Ezuthupara			Idukki		Upload Photo
S-KL-20	Ruins of ancient granite temple			Idukki		Upload Photo
S-KL-21	Ezhimala Fort at Ettikulam	Ezhimala, Ettikulam		Kannur		Upload Photo
S-KL-22	Padmanapuram palace	Padmanabhapuram		Kanyakumari (Tamil Nadu)		Padmanapuram palace
S-KL-23	Poyyilkotta	Kasargod		Kasargod		Upload Photo
S-KL-24	Peelicode cave	Pilicode		Kasargod		Peelicode cave
S-KL-25	Chandragir fort			Kasargod		Chandragir fort
S-KL-26	Kottukkal Rock cut temple	Kottukkal		Kollam		Kottukkal Rock cut temple
S-KL-27	Punallur suspension bridge	Punalur		Kollam		Punallur suspension bridge More images
S-KL-28	Madankavu	Kollam		Kollam		Upload Photo
S-KL-29	Chanthamath temple	Kollam		Kollam		Upload Photo
S-KL-30	Buddha Image	Kollam		Kollam		Upload Photo
S-KL-31	Pundarikapuram Temple	Thalayolaparambu, Kottayam		Kottayam		Pundarikapuram Temple
S-KL-32	Monuments indicating the 1st arrival of Vasco-de-Gama at Kappad	Kappad		Kozhikode		Monuments indicating the 1st arrival of Vasco-de-Gama at Kappad
S-KL-33	Tipu Sultan for paramukku, Kottasthalam	Kottasthalam		Kozhikode		Upload Photo
S-KL-34	Kottukkal Kunhalimarakkars House	Kottukkal		Kozhikode		Upload Photo
S-KL-35	Venkittathevar Shiva Temple (Kottakkal)	Kottakkal		Malappuram		Venkittathevar Shiva Temple (Kottakkal)
S-KL-36	Kallilmadam	Palakkad		Palakkad district		Kallilmadam
S-KL-37	Madavoorpara Rock cut cave	Thiruvananthapuram		Thiruvananthapuram		Madavoorpara Rock cut cave
S-KL-38	Thirunarayanapuram Vishnu temple	Thiruvananthapuram		Thiruvananthapuram		Upload Photo
S-KL-39	Thrivikaramangalam temple	Thiruvananthapuram		Thiruvananthapuram		Upload Photo
S-KL-40	Neeramangara temple	Thiruvananthapuram		Thiruvananthapuram		Upload Photo
S-KL-41	Trivandrum fort	Thiruvananthapuram		Thiruvananthapuram		Trivandrum fort
S-KL-42	Vizinjam Bhagavati temple	Vizinjam, Thiruvananthapuram		Thiruvananthapuram		Upload Photo
S-KL-43	Vishnu temple Aruvikkane	Aruvikkara		Thiruvananthapuram		Upload Photo
S-KL-44	Old Palace	Thiruvananthapuram		Thiruvananthapuram		Old Palace
S-KL-45	Pandavanpara	Chengannoor		Alapuzha	9°18′45″N 76°36′40″E	Pandavanpara
S-KL-46	The fort walls around Sree Padmanabha swamy temple. The fort gates and the sites in which they stand.	Thiruvananthapuram		Thiruvananthapuram		The fort walls around Sree Padmanabha swamy temple. The fort gates and the sites in which they stand. More images
S-KL-47	Ayyippilla Asan and Ayyinipilla Assan Smaraka mandapam	Thiruvananthapuram		Thiruvananthapuram		Upload Photo
S-KL-48	Birth Place of Sri Vidhyadhi Raja Chattambi Swamikal	Thiruvananthapuram		Thiruvananthapuram		Upload Photo
S-KL-49	Porkalam - Dolmens	Talappilly		Thrissur		Upload Photo
S-KL-50	Kizthali temple	Kodungallur	Methala	Thrissur		Upload Photo
S-KL-51	Sakthan Thampuran Palace	Thrissur		Thrissur		Upload Photo
S-KL-52	Two images - Nagaraja and Nagayakshi under a Satparna Tree	Vadakkechira Palace compound (Sakthan Thampuran Palace), Thrissur		Thrissur		Two images - Nagaraja and Nagayakshi under a Satparna Tree
S-KL-53	Monuments in palace Toppu (Vadakkechira Palace compound)	Vadakkechira, Thrissur		Thrissur		Upload Photo
S-KL-54	Monolithic monument	Thrissur	One menhir (Perichikallu) kept in front of Agathimandiram, Ponganamkadu near Viyyoor. One was invented near Kuttur industrial area (it has fallen down).	Thrissur		Monolithic monument
S-KL-55	Western gateway	Thrissur		Thrissur		Upload Photo
S-KL-56	Eastern gateway	Thrissur	An arched gateway with ornamentation and wicked gates. This is much older than the western gateway.	Thrissur		Upload Photo
S-KL-57	Tippu's flag staff	Thrissur	Planted originally on the North West corner of the Fortification round the Palace (Sakthan Thampuran Palace), but shifted and planted on the remaining part of the ruined fort. Near the western gateway.	Thrissur		Upload Photo
S-KL-58	A dolmen in Anapanthan	Anapanthan		Thrissur		Upload Photo
S-KL-59	A dolmen in Puthupara in Kothumuzhi	Puthupara, Kothumuzhi		Thrissur		Upload Photo
S-KL-60	A dolmen south of Travancore line near Puthupara	Puthupara		Thrissur		Upload Photo
S-KL-61	One muniyara with side rooms near Mylaeappur	Mylaeappur		Thrissur		Upload Photo
S-KL-62	Idol of Ganapathi at Elicode	Elicode		Thrissur		Upload Photo
S-KL-63	Ruined temple dedicated to Vishnu in Bhantamalai in Trikkur beat	Bhantamalai, Trikkur		Thrissur		Upload Photo
S-KL-64	An idol of Siva in Bhantamala	Bhantamala		Thrissur		Upload Photo
S-KL-65	A circular well in Bhantamala	Bhantamala		Thrissur		Upload Photo
S-KL-66	Munipara - 6 muniyaras	Munipara		Thrissur		Upload Photo
S-KL-67	Chendrayi - 3 muniyaras	Chendrayi		Thrissur		Upload Photo
S-KL-68	Kunamkuzhigara - 2 muniyaras	Kunamkuzhigara		Thrissur		Upload Photo
S-KL-69	Adiappilly - 1 muniyara	Adiappilly		Thrissur		Upload Photo
S-KL-70	Valathu thandu - 2 muniyaras	Valathu Thandu		Thrissur		Upload Photo
S-KL-71	Irappanapara - 3 muniyaras	Irappanapara		Thrissur		Upload Photo
S-KL-72	One rock cut cave	Thrissur		Thrissur		Upload Photo
S-KL-73	One Muniyara at Vailathanpara	Vailathanpara		Thrissur		Upload Photo
S-KL-74	Dilapidated Siva temple in the Athanad hill	Athanad Hill		Thrissur		Upload Photo
S-KL-75	Two muniyaras at Thandikadu	Thandikadu		Thrissur		Upload Photo
S-KL-76	One muniyara near Adukkalapura	Adukkalapura		Thrissur		Upload Photo
S-KL-77	Two muniyara near Verthilapara	Verthilapara		Thrissur		Upload Photo
S-KL-78	One muniyara near Vaniampara	Vaniampara		Thrissur		Upload Photo
S-KL-79	One muniyara near Kaipikad	Kaipikad		Thrissur		Upload Photo
S-KL-80	Fifteen muniyaras near Perumthambar	Perumthambar		Thrissur		Upload Photo
S-KL-81	Nine muniyaras near Thalikuzhi	Thalikuzhi		Thrissur		Upload Photo
S-KL-82	Site of Bana's fort and Siva temple, Pannarcheri	Pannarcheri		Thrissur		Upload Photo
S-KL-83	One muniyara in Kundanthodu	Kundanthodu		Thrissur		Upload Photo
S-KL-84	One muniyara in Kundanthodu	Kundanthodu		Thrissur		Upload Photo
S-KL-85	One Siva Temple in Elanad village	Elanad		Thrissur		Upload Photo
S-KL-86	One Siva temple in the reserve in Chelakara beat	Chelakara		Thrissur		Upload Photo
S-KL-87	Three muniyaras in the reserve in Pallamparatha in Vazhani beat	Pallamparatha, Vazhani		Thrissur		Upload Photo
S-KL-88	Four muniyara in the ridge of top in Mukkunipara reserve in Kallampara beat	Mukkunipara, Kallampara		Thrissur		Four muniyara in the ridge of top in Mukkunipara reserve in Kallampara beat
S-KL-89	Four muniyaras in Cheppara in Kallampara beat	Cheppara, Kallampara		Thrissur		Upload Photo
S-KL-90	Dilapidated Sastha Temple in Iyyapakkunnu	Iyyapakkunnu		Thrissur		Upload Photo
S-KL-91	Vatteluthu inscriptions	Thrissur		Thrissur		Upload Photo
S-KL-92	Temple Site	Thrissur		Thrissur		Upload Photo
S-KL-93	Menhir near Ramavarmapuram	Mukundapuram	Megalithic monument on the side of the Thrissur - Kundukadu Road.	Thrissur		Upload Photo
S-KL-94	Pre-historic cave	Thrissur		Thrissur		Upload Photo
S-KL-95	Megalithic monument	Thrissur		Thrissur		Upload Photo
S-KL-96	Port hole cist	Thrissur		Thrissur		Upload Photo
S-KL-97	Vadakkunnathan temple	Thrissur		Thrissur		Vadakkunnathan temple
S-KL-98	Irunilacode temple	Thrissur		Thrissur		Upload Photo
S-KL-99	Old fortification	Thrissur		Thrissur		Upload Photo
S-KL-100	Megalithic monuments near the T.B hospital site	Thrissur		Thrissur		Upload Photo
S-KL-101	Tomb of Veera Pazhassi Raja	Mananthawadi		Wayanad		Tomb of Veera Pazhassi Raja
S-KL-102	Cave at Edakkal	Edakkal		Wayanad		Cave at Edakkal
S-KL-103	Stone inscriptions	Kottayil Kovilakam, North Paravur	Kottayil Kovilakam, Kerala 683521	Ernakulam	10°10′00″N 76°14′53″E	Stone inscriptions
S-KL-104	Pazhoor Perumthrikovil Siva Temple, Piravam	Piravam	Piravam, Kerala 686664	Ernakulam	9°53′05″N 76°28′17″E	Pazhoor Perumthrikovil Siva Temple, Piravam
S-KL-105	Uliyannur Mahadeva Temple, Aluva	Uliyannoor, Aluva	Uliyannoor, Aluva, Kerala 683108	Ernakulam	10°05′56″N 76°20′24″E	Uliyannur Mahadeva Temple, Aluva
S-KL-106	Thirumarady Sri Mahadeva Temple	Thirumarady, Moovattupuzha	Thirumarady, Kerala 686687	Ernakulam	9°53′14″N 76°33′10″E	Upload Photo
S-KL-107	Jewish Synagogue, North Paravur	North Paravur	Kottayil Kovilakam, Kerala 683521	Ernakulam	10°10′08″N 76°14′53″E	Jewish Synagogue, North Paravur
S-KL-108	Bastian Bungalow, Fort Kochi	Fort Kochi	Napier Street, Fort Kochi, Kochi, Kerala 682001	Ernakulam	9°57′51″N 76°14′13″E	Bastian Bungalow, Fort Kochi
S-KL-109	Hill Palace Archaeological Museum, Thrippunithura	Thrippunithura	Hill Palace Rd, Irumpanam, Thrippunithura, Kerala 682301	Ernakulam	9°57′10″N 76°21′42″E	Hill Palace Archaeological Museum, Thrippunithura
S-KL-110	Thekkumbhagam Synagogue	Ernakulam	Market Rd, Ernakulam, Kerala 682031	Ernakulam	9°58′50″N 76°16′38″E	Upload Photo
S-KL-111	St. George Church, Puthenpally	Varapuzha	Puthenpally, Varapuzha, Kerala 683517	Ernakulam	10°04′57″N 76°16′19″E	St. George Church, Puthenpally
S-KL-112	Thirumarayikkulam Mahadeva Temple, Edakkad	Edakkad	Edakkad	Ernakulam		Upload Photo
S-KL-113	Kadmattam Church	Kadamattam	Kadamattam, Kerala	Ernakulam	9°58′37″N 76°29′43″E	Upload Photo
S-KL-114	Narasimha moorthi Temple, Kaippattoor	Kaippattoor	Kaipattoor, Kerala 682313	Ernakulam	9°51′01″N 76°26′33″E	Upload Photo
S-KL-115	St. Sebastian's Church	Thrippunithura	Thrippunithura, Ernakulam, Kerala 682307	Ernakulam	9°52′57″N 76°22′29″E	Upload Photo
S-KL-116	Old Jew Cemetery, Ernakulam	Marine Drive, Kochi	Lt. Unniyattil Karunakaran Ln, Marine Drive, Ernakulam, Kerala 682031	Ernakulam	9°58′33″N 76°16′47″E	Upload Photo

== See also ==
- List of State Protected Monuments in India, for other State Protected Monuments in India
- List of Monuments of National Importance in Kerala
