= Thiruvankulam =

- Census town
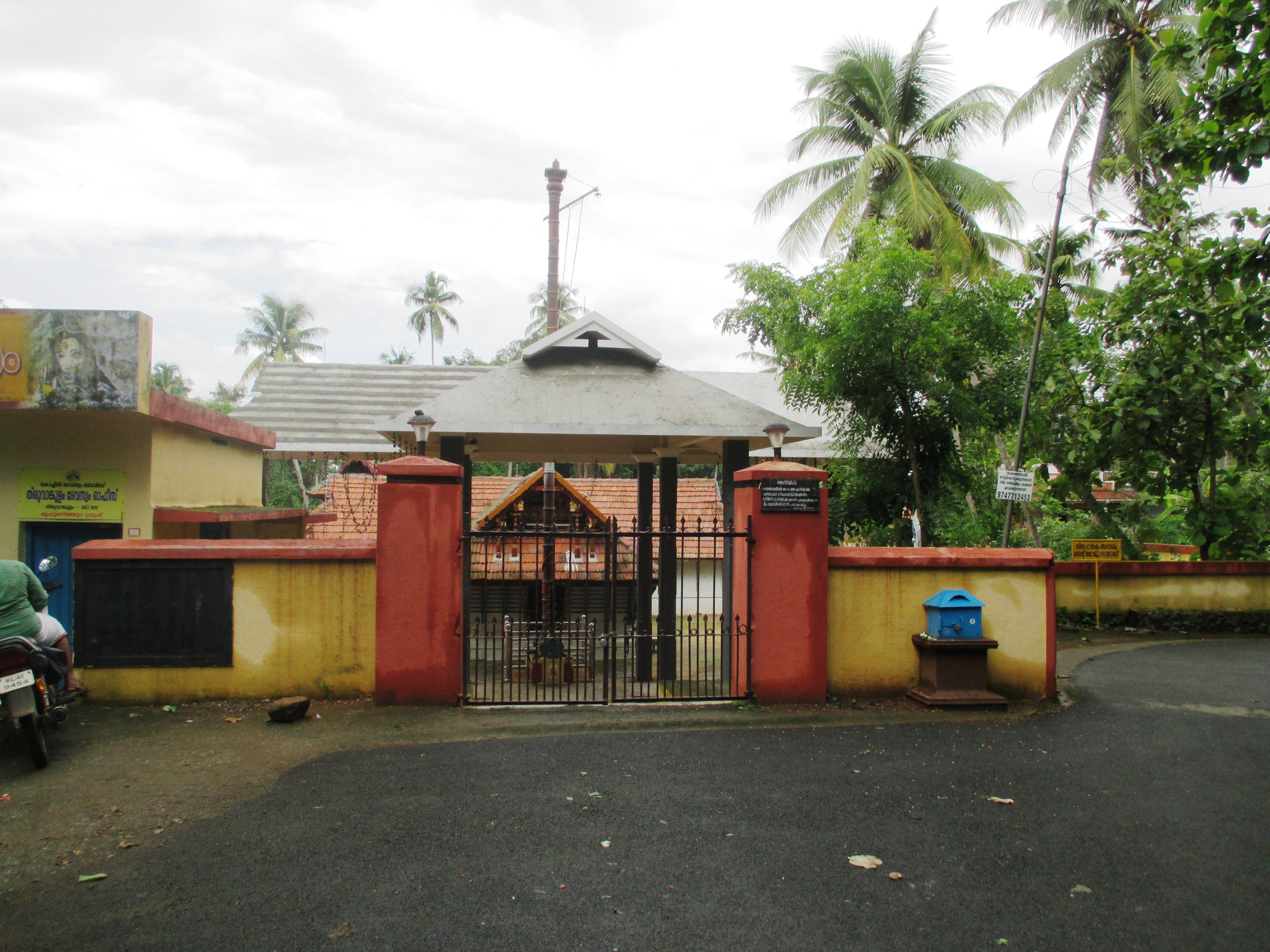
- Shiva Temple
- Interactive map of Thiruvankulam
- Coordinates: 9.943569°N 76.373904°E
- Country: India
- State: Kerala
- District: Ernakulam

Area
  - Total: 10.49 km^{2} (4.05 sq mi)

Population (2011)
  - Total: 23,160
  - Density: 2,208/km^{2} (5,720/sq mi)

Languages
  - Official: Malayalam, English
- Time zone: UTC+5:30 (IST)

Thiruvankulam is a census town in Thrippunithura municipality, in Ernakulam district, Kerala, India. The area is a part of the Kochi metropolitan area. NH 85 passes through Thiruvankulam. The Karingachira junction is the location of the southern terminus of the Seaport-Airport Road, which connects the Cochin International Airport and the Cochin Port.

In the present day, Thiruvankulam's proximity to the city as well as industrial areas comprising the Kochi refineries and allied industries have contributed to its growth. The economic development of Kochi, as well as the nearby refinery industry have resulted in Thiruvankulam emerging as a major residential area.

== Etymology ==
The name "Thiruvankulam" is derived from the Malayalam Thiru-vayaram-kulam (with vayar meaning "stomach, kulam meaning "pond", and Thiru- meaning "his"). The legend behind the name is related to Shiva and Parashurama. According to the legend, the Shiva temple at Thiruvankulam is one out of four other Shiva temples that Parasurama had built (with the other three temples located in Kureekkad, Perunninakulam and Trikkathara) when he saw Shiva spread across all these four places.

== History ==
In the 13th and 14th centuries, Thiruvankulam was a border village of the Kingdom of Cochin with the Kingdom of Travancore. The Kavaleeshwaram stream, now a canal, separated the two kingdoms. Thiruvankulam is the location of the Hill Palace, which was the imperial administrative office and official residence of the Cochin royal family.

== Demographics ==
Historical population
Year	Pop.	±%
1991	18,412	—
2001	21,713	+17.9%
2011	23,160	+6.7%

As per the 2011 census of India, the Thiruvankulam census town has a total population of 23,160 and a population density of 2,208 inhabitants per square kilometre (5,720/sq mi). Of this, 49.14% are male and 50.86% are female. 8.01% of the population is under 6 years of age. Scheduled Castes and Scheduled Tribes constitute 17.28% and 0.40% of the population respectively. The total literacy rate was 97.25% (98.37% for males and 96.18% for females), which is higher than the state average of 94% and the national average of 74.04%.

=== Religion ===
Religion in Thiruvankulam (2011)
1. Hinduism (69.2%)
2. Christianity (29.4%)
3. Islam (0.71%)
4. None (0.60%)
5. Other (0.04%)

According to the 2011 census, Hindus are the majority with 69% of the population adhering to the religion. Christians form a significant minority, constituting 29% of the population. Muslims constitute 0.71% of the population.

The St. George Cathedral, said to have been established in 722 AD, is an ancient church of the Nasrani community in the Thrippunithura region. The Shiva temple in Thiruvankulam, from which the place name originates, attracts many devotees for its unique festivals and rituals.

== Administration ==
Thiruvankulam is in Piravom assembly constituency.Thiruvankulam was administered by a special grade panchayat (village or non-urban habitation) under the Kerala Panchayati Raj Act. In 2010, as a result of the re-organization of administrative divisions in Kerala, Thiruvankulam panchayat merged with the neighbouring Tripunithura Municipality.

== Economic activities ==
The village is home to large petroleum corporations as well as numerous small scale and cottage industries. TRACO Cable Company, a cable manufacturer, as well major oil corporations like Bharat Petroleum, Indian Oil Corporation, Hindustan Petroleum have their presence there. Agriculture, though it has fallen from the status of the prime means of livelihood in Thiruvankulam, is still in good shape. The major produces include coconuts, arecanuts, nutmeg, and pepper. Rice cultivation is on the decline.

Most people are employed in the city of Kochi, major employers being the Kochi Refineries, HOC, FACT and the government of Kerala.

== Places to visit ==
=== Hill Palace ===
Hill Palace is a large archaeological museum in Thiruvankulam, Kerala. It was the administrative office of the princely state of Kochi. Built in 1865, the palace complex that occupies a hill consists of 49 buildings in the traditional architectural style, spreading across 54 acres (220,000 m^{2}). The complex has an archaeological museum, a heritage museum, a deer park, a 'prehistoric' park, and a children's park. The land surrounding the Hill Palace has rare medicinal plants as it used to be a medicinal garden nurtured by the royal gardeners.

The palace has been converted into a museum and is open to public all days except Mondays from 9:00 am to 12:30 pm and 2:00 pm to 4:30 pm.

The Malayalam film, Manichitrathazhu was filmed in this palace.

=== Karingachira Church ===
A Jacobite Syrian Church was built in 722 AD near Hill Palace, Tripunitura. The church is named after Saint George. The Katthanar (Vicar) of Karingachira was considered the representative of the Nazarani community of the erstwhile Cochin State. The Saint Parumala Thirumeni was ordained as a deacon in this church in 1857 AD.

This church was elevated as a cathedral by Patriarch Ignatius Zakka I Iwas in 2004.
