= N. N. Rimzon =

Indian artist

- Born: Nedumgottil Narayanan Rimzon; 1957 (age 68–69); Kakkoor, Kerala, India
- Spouse: Daisy Mathew
- Children: Ritu Rimzon

N. N. Rimzon (born 1957) is an Indian artist known primarily for his symbolic and enigmatic sculptures. His metal, fiberglass and stone sculptures have won him international acclaim, though in recent years his drawings have gained recognition.

== Career ==
Rimzon studied sculpture at the College of Fine Arts, Thiruvananthapuram. He studied at Maharaja Sayajirao University of Baroda, where he was considered among the best of the upcoming generation of artists that stemmed from MSU alumni including Jyoti Bhatt and Bhupen Khakhar. In 1989 he earned his MA with distinction from the Royal College of Art, London.

N. N. Rimzon has been featured in solo and group exhibitions worldwide, including in a 2024 show at The Barbican Centre titled The Imaginary Institution of India, a 2016 exhibition titled Pond Near the Field at the Kiran Nadar Museum of Art, and a 2014 exhibition titled Rewriting the Landscape: India and China at the National Museum of Modern and Contemporary Art in South Korea. His work has also been shown at Talwar Gallery in New York City and New Delhi, the Queensland Art Gallery, the Museum of Contemporary Art in Antwerp, and the Asia Society, amidst other institutions.

Rimzon has participated in several international biennials, including the 5th Beijing International Art Biennale in 2012 and the 2006 Busan Biennale.

== Works ==
Born in the Indian state of Kerala, Rimzon's artistic vocabulary finds root in symbols derived from the rural landscape of southern India: the village compound, the palm tree, the temple, the forest pathway and the handmade canoe. In Rimzon's drawings he develops the themes that are found in his sculpture. Charcoal and dry pastel is used with a simple grace of line to create an often eerie and evocative stillness. This pristine tranquility seems to be intruded upon by symbols such as the sword and the felled tree. A sense of tragedy or alienation underlies depictions of what might otherwise be thought to be rural idylls. Rimzon's later works seem as much concerned with ecological threats as with communal aggression.

As a young man Rimzon experienced the political upheaval that accompanied Indira Gandhi's Emergency during the mid-1970s. This was one factor that moved him away from narrative painting to experimentation with conceptually motivated sculpture. Rimzon concentrated on themes that depicted humanity's entrapment and anguish in a hostile environment that was of man's own making. In The Inner Voice (1992), a sculpted nude figure, cast in fiberglass, is displayed with its back against the wall and surrounded by a semicircle of cast iron swords. In Speaking Stones (1998), a crouching nude figure uses its hands to both hold its head and shield its eyes. The figure is surrounded by naturally sharp stones, which rest on photographs depicting massacres, demolitions, and other acts of communal violence that have been part of India's more recent history.
