= Parukkaikudi =

- Village
- Location in Tamil Nadu, India
- Coordinates: 9.383053°N 78.508301°E
- Country: India
- State: Tamil Nadu
- District: Ramanathapuram
- Elevation: 20 m (66 ft)

Population
  - Total: 500

Languages
  - Official: Tamil
- Time zone: UTC+5:30 (IST)
- PIN: 623704
- Telephone code: 4576
- Vehicle registration: TN 65

Parukkaikudi is a village in the Ramanathapuram district of the Indian state of Tamil Nadu.

Parukkaikudi is a small Village/hamlet in Mudukulathur Taluk in Ramanathapuram District of Tamil Nadu state, India. It comes under Anaiseri Panchayath. It is located 31 km towards west from District headquarters Ramanathapuram, 3 km from Mudukulathur and 526 km from state capital Chennai.

Parukkaikudi Pin code is 623704 and postal head office is Vadakkur.

Vilangalathur A/b (2 km), Mudukulathur (4 km), Puliyangudi (6 km), Kakkoor A/b (7 km) and Mahindi (8 km) are the nearby villages to Parukkaikudi. Parukkaikudi is surrounded by Paramakkudi Taluk towards North, Kamudi Taluk towards west, Kadaladi Taluk towards South and Bogalur Taluk towards East. Paramakudi, Ramanathapuram, Aruppukkottai and Sivaganga are the near by cities to Parukkaikudi.

== Gallery ==
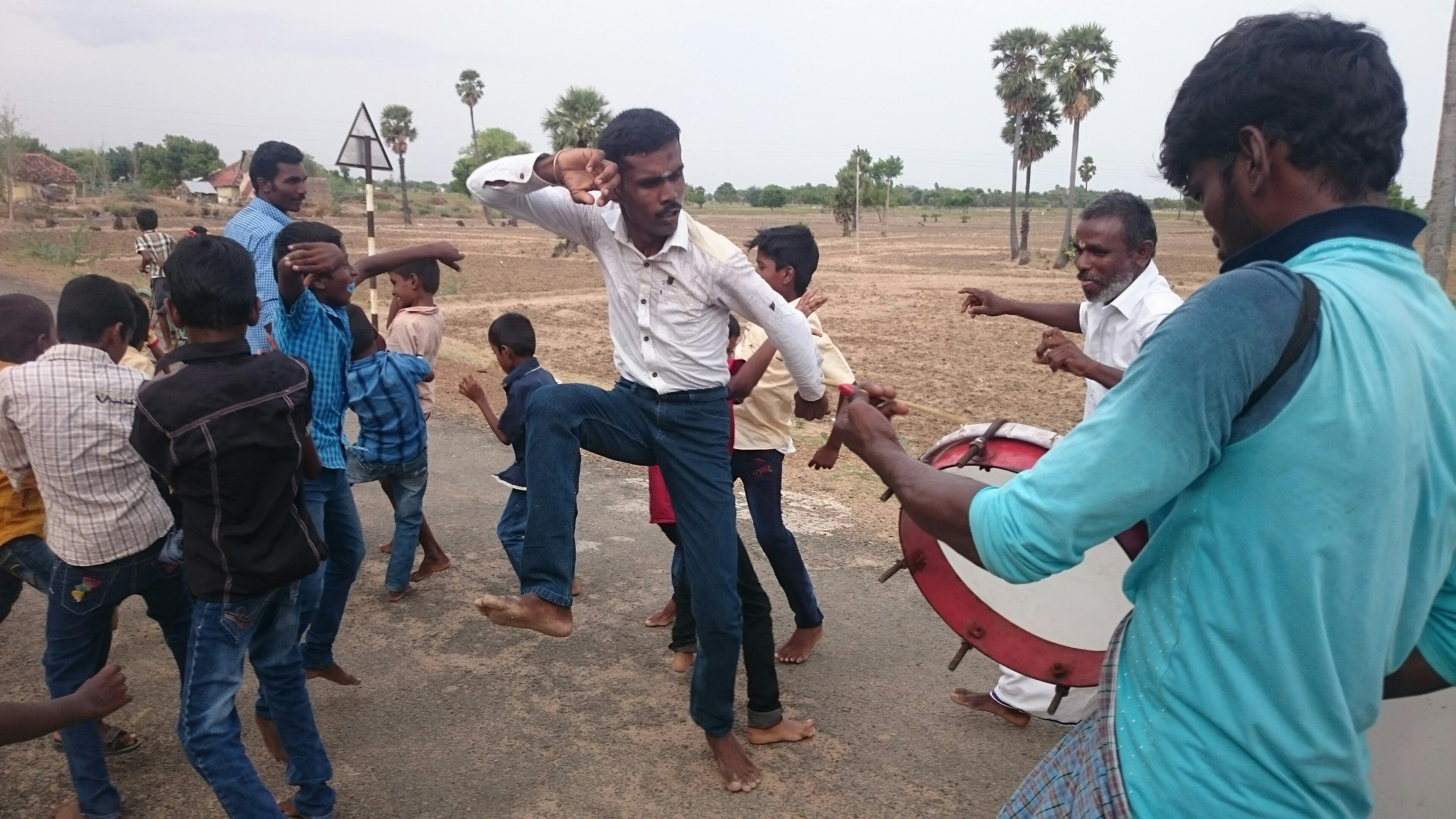
Krishna Jayanthi celebration

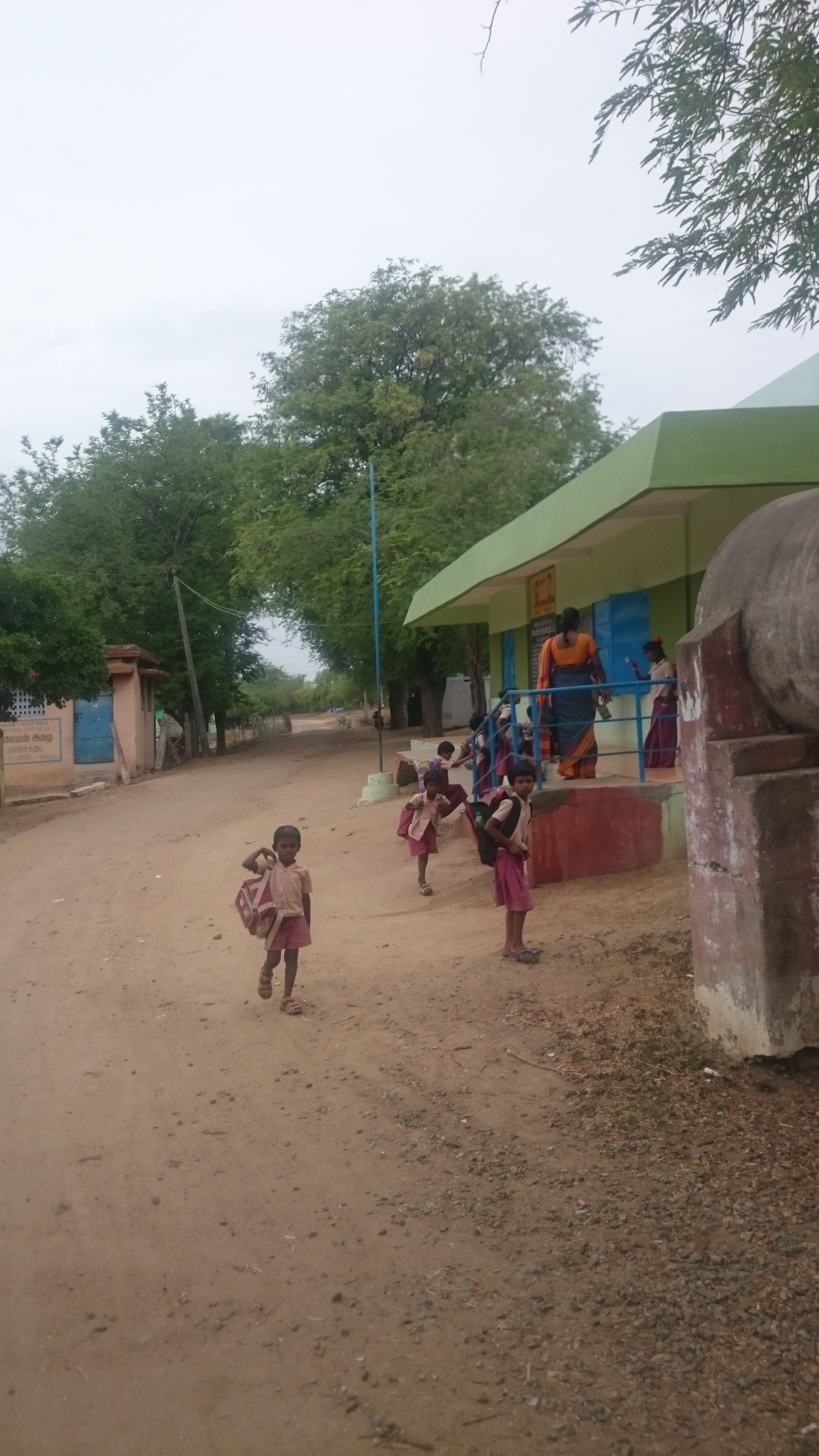
School

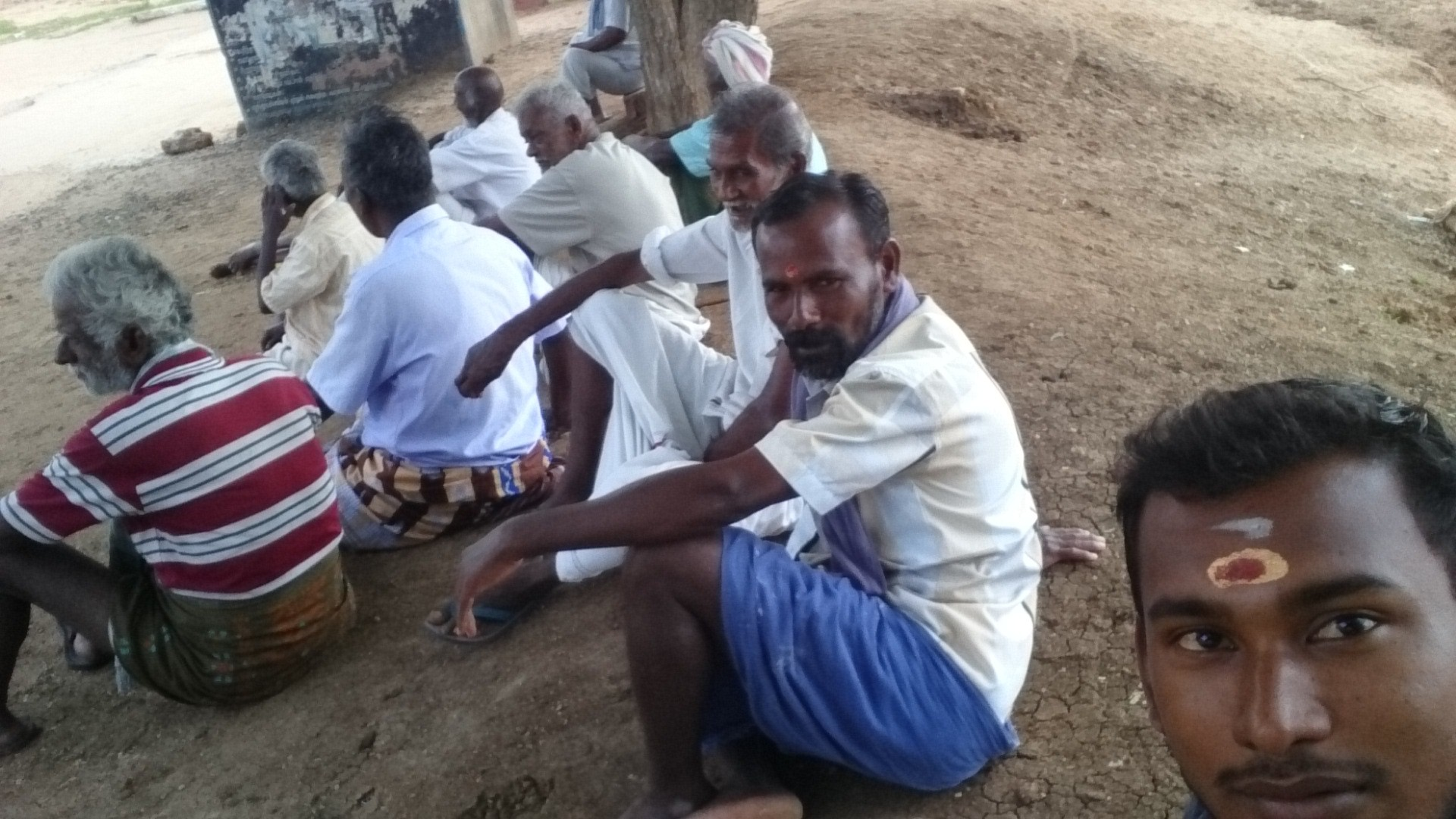
Krishna Jayanthi celebration
