= Ariyittuvazhcha Kovilakam =

Building in Mattancherry, Kerala, India

Coordinates: 9°57′26″N 76°15′10″E

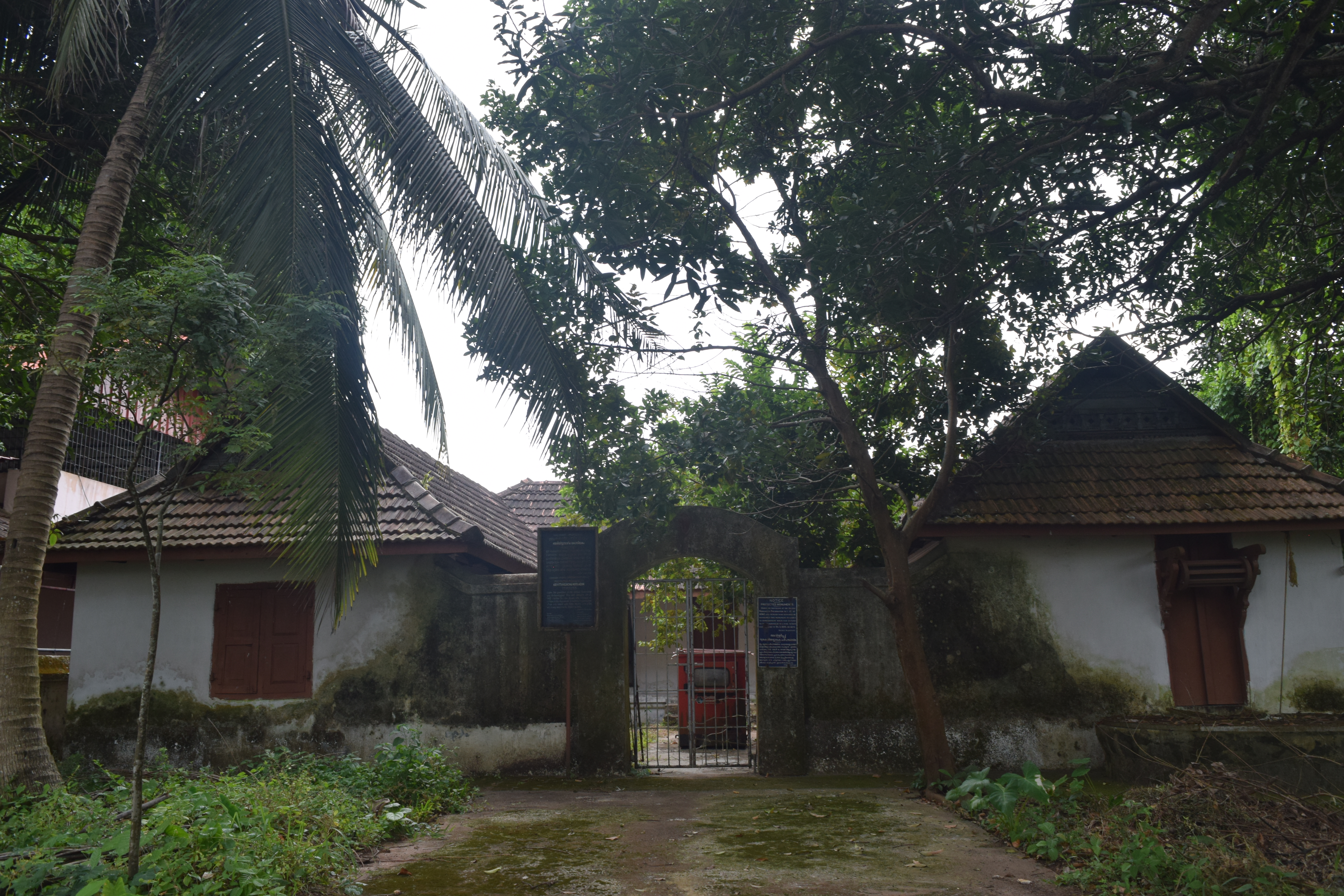
Ariyittuvazhcha Kovilakam

Ariyittuvazhcha Kovilakam is a building in Mattancherry in the Indian state of Kerala. This building was used to perform the ceremony of Ariyittuvazhcha by the Maharajas of erstwhile Cochin Kingdom. This is a state protected monument declared by Kerala State. The building is in the style of nālukettu. It was constructed of brick and wood and the ceiling is covered with burned mud pieces called "oodu". This building was opened only for the coronation. A cot in the locked room in the cottage, used only during coronation.

== History ==
Ariyittuvazhcha is a coronation ceremony performed by Maharaja of Cochin kingdom. This ceremony began with a procession from the Dutch palace and progress to Ariyittuvazcha Kovilakam. The Maharaja would then bathe in the pond. After that the locked room was opened and the Maharaja sat on the cot with an olakkuda (an umbrella made of palm fronds). The priests performed the Vedic rituals and rice was showered on the king in blessing. This is called Ariyittuvazhcha. Ari is the Malayalam name of rice. A large crowd witnessed this ceremony and they make kurava or Ululation when the ceremony is performed.

After coronation, the Maharaja would go to the Palliyarakadavu temple, opposite to Mattancherry Palace.

After this whole ritual the Cochin Kingdom would have a new king.
