= Thiru Nayathode Siva Narayana Temple =

Hindu temple in Ernakulam District, Kerala, India

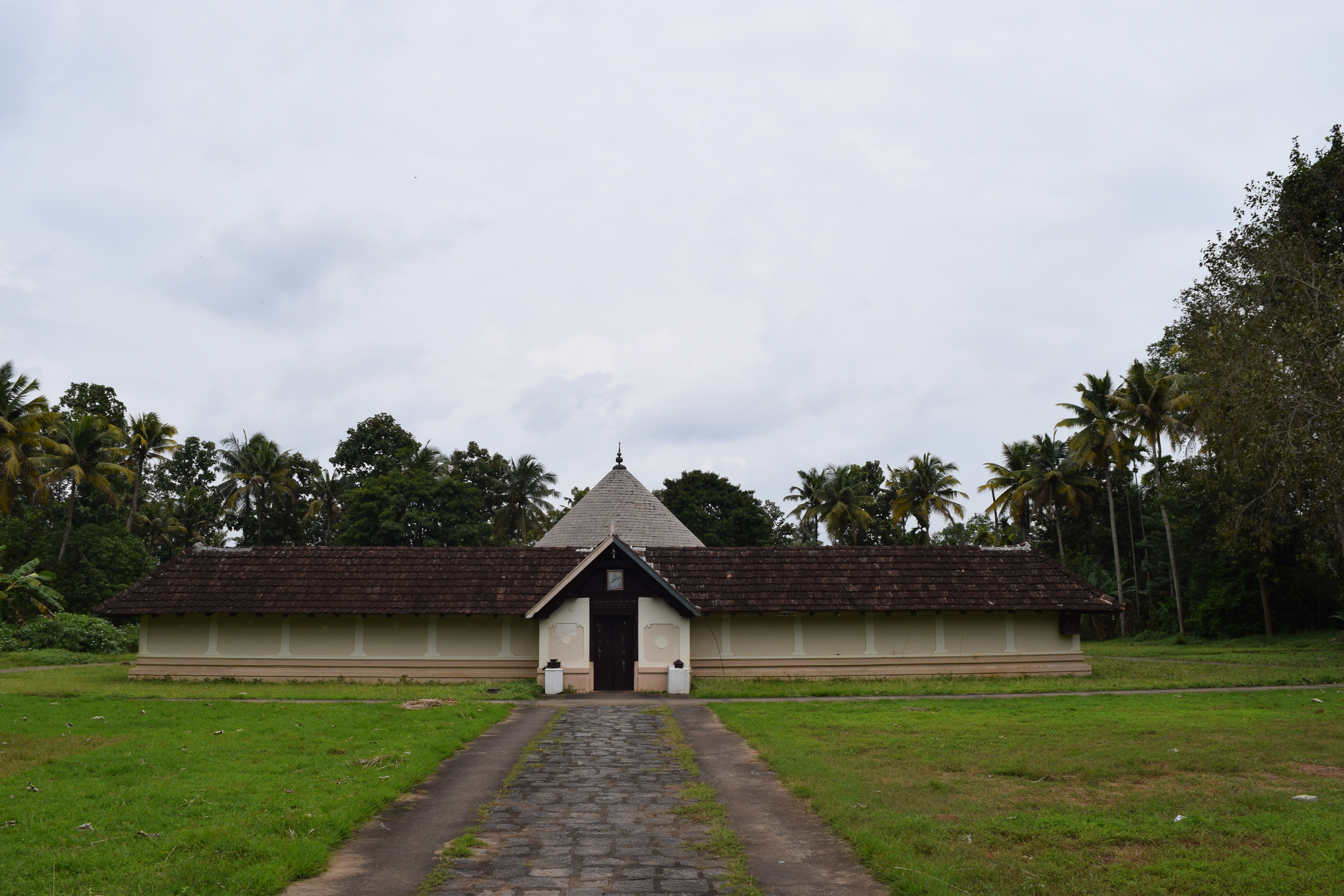
- Entrance of the temple

- Location on Kerala state

Religion
- Affiliation: Hinduism
- District: Ernakulam
- Deity: Shiva & Mahavishnu

Location
- Location: Nayathode
- State: Kerala
- Country: India
- Coordinates: 10.166911°N 76.403499°E

Architecture
- Type: Kerala Traditional
- Founder: Cheraman Perumal Nayanar
- Elevation: 34.3 m (113 ft)

Thiru Nayathode Siva Narayana Temple at Nayathod, a small village in Ernakulam District, Kerala, India, is a protected monument by Archeological Department, Kerala. The deities are Shiva and Mahavishnu.
