= Trikkur Mahadeva Temple =

Hindu temple in Kerala

Thrikkur Mahadeva Cave Temple
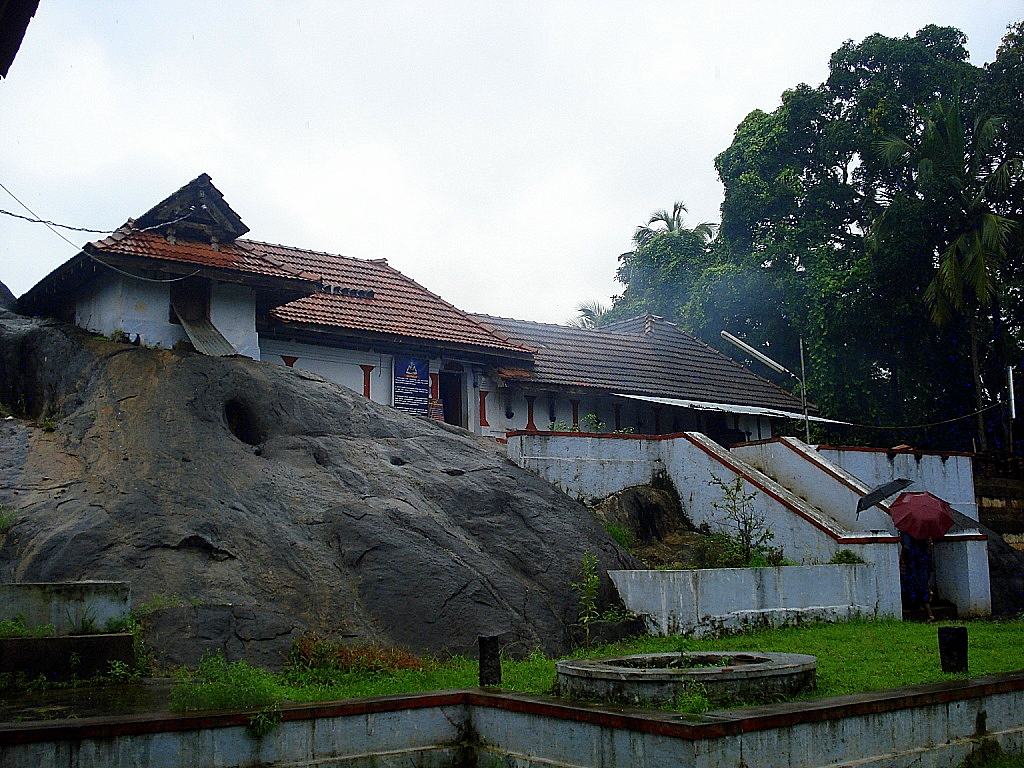

- Mahadeva Temple, Trikkur, Thrissur, Kerala

Religion
- Affiliation: Hinduism
- District: Thrissur
- Deity: Shiva
- Festivals: Makaram ulsavam Shivarathri; Kalabhabhishekam

Location
- Location: Trikkur
- State: Kerala
- Country: India
- Interactive map of Thrikkur Mahadeva Cave Temple
- Coordinates: 10.461857°N 76.270936°E

Architecture
- Type: Architecture of Kerala

Specifications
- Temple: One
- Elevation: 61.79 m (203 ft)

Trikkur Mahadeva Temple is a rock-cut cave temple in Trikkur village in Thrissur District in Kerala believed to have been built in the 7th or 8th century. Being a cave temple, Buddhist and Jain monks used the site to meditate alongside the Hindu monks. It is a protected monument under the Department of Archaeology, Govt of Kerala since 1966. The temple and its premises are now owned by Paliyam Trust which is managed by Kshetra Samrakshana Samiti (Temple Protection Committee).

The main deity of this temple is Lord Shiva a.k.a. Mahadeva, as the name suggests. It is believed that the huge Shivalinga here was consecrated by Lord Agni. Thus, it is believed that Lord Agni always worships Lord Shiva, and he accompanies him. Due to this belief, the idol is not carried outside for processions on rainy days.

The temple is located on the top of the hillock inside a 30 feet long and 12 feet broad natural cave. The huge Shiva Linga is at the southern end of the cave, just above this there is a waterhole that never dries even in the hottest days during summers. The Shiva Linga faces the east, but the door of the Garbhagriha is faced towards North. The Linga is in the center, fixed on to a rectangular pedestal. There is an evergreen pond on the top of the rock. Since 1966, the temple is a protected monument under the Department of Archaeology.

== Architecture ==
The Sanctum of the temple is located inside the cave which is 12 feet long and 8 feet wide. In front of the sanctum, there is a Mugha mandapa, entirely carved in the rock with beautiful artistry. Although the deity looks east during Darshan, the devotees can only see the right side of the Lingam. (“Parshwa Darshan”.)

The goddess Parvathi also resides there, perpetually to Lord Shiva, personifying knowledge. Lord Ganapathi's image is carved on the wall of the cave towards the west side of the sanctuary. The rock-laden soil and the Namasakara Mandapa, built from 16 pillars made of rock, present a large number of beautiful sculptures. To the north of the temple is a hall where Saraswati Pooja and Chakyar Koothu are led during Navratri and many religious events respectively.
