= Padinjarechira =

Pond in Thrissur, India

- Padinjare Chira
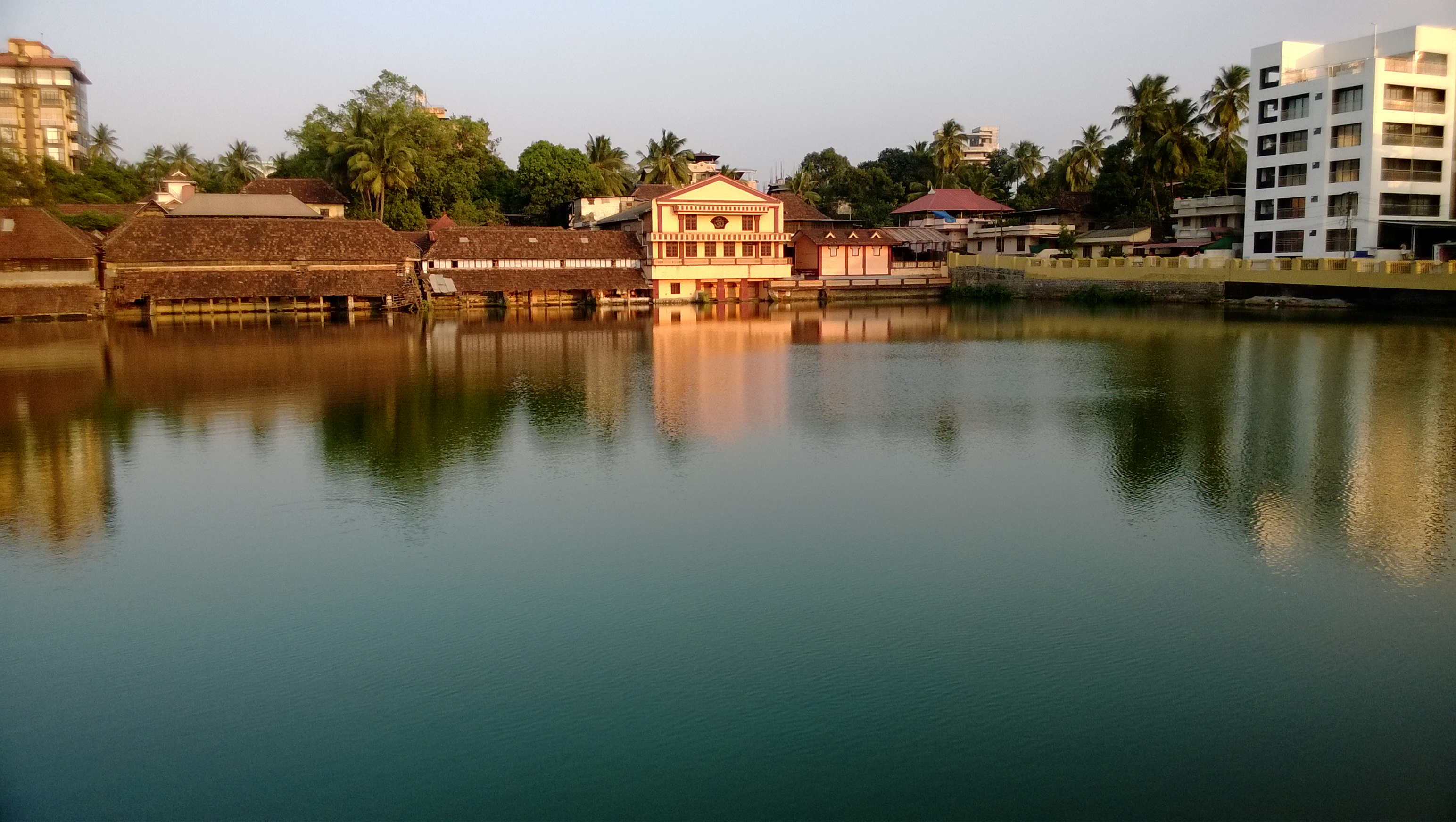
- A view of Padinjarechira pond

- Location within Kerala Location within India
- Location: Thrissur city, Kerala
- Coordinates: 10°31′19″N 76°12′33″E
- Type: Artificial pond
- Basin countries: India
- Settlements: Thrissur

Padinjarechira is one of the four oldest ponds in Thrissur city of Kerala in India. It was built by Shakthan Thampuran (1751–1805) and is one of Thrissur's famous landmarks. It is owned by Vadakke Madhom.

== History ==
Sakthan Thampuran, Maharaja of Cochin, built four ponds in Thrissur city for water management and irrigation purpose in his regime. They are Vadakkechira, Padinjarechira, Thekkechira and Kizakechira. Among these, the latter two have been ceased to exist.
