= St. George Jacobite Syrian Cathedral, Karingachira =

Coordinates: 9.9515°N 76.3575°E

St. George Cathedral, Karingachira
- St. George Jacobite Syrian Cathedral (Global Georgian Pilgrim Center) Karingachira
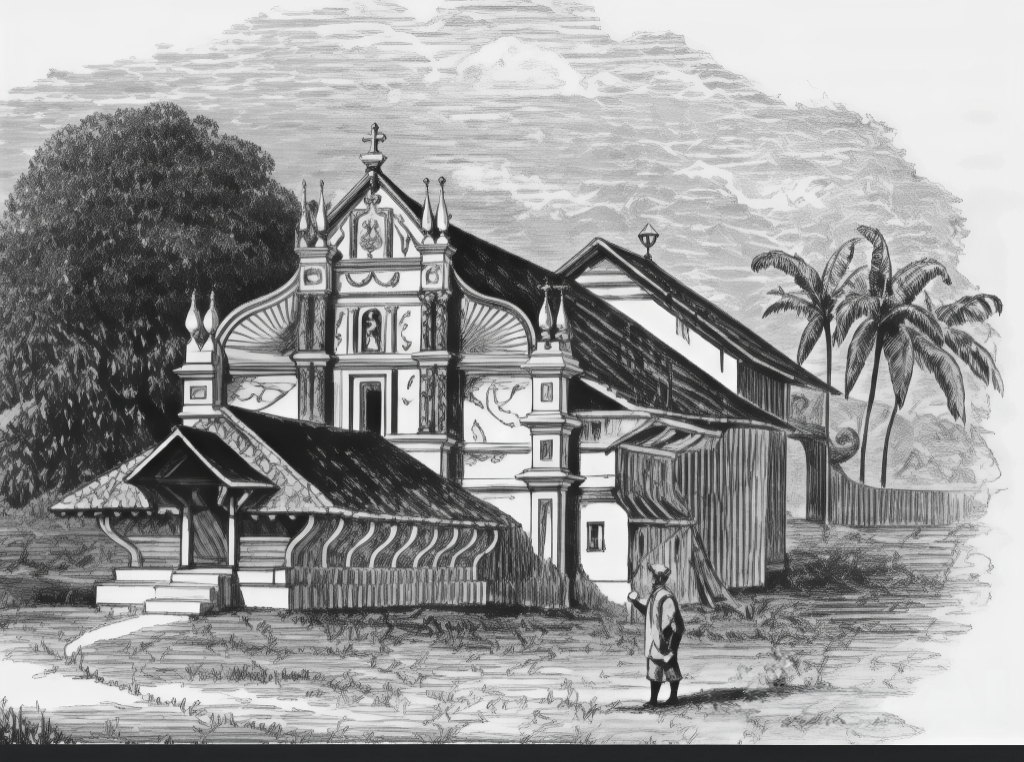
- Old Karingachira Church which was seen by Claudius Buchanan
- St. George Cathedral, Karingachira
- Location: Cochin, Kerala
- Country: India
- Denomination: Jacobite Syriac Orthodox Church
- Website: www.stgeorgecathedral.in

History
- Status: Minor Basilica
- Founded: 722 AD
- Dedication: Saint George, Saint Mary, John the Baptist

Architecture
- Functional status: Active
- Architectural type: Malankara Church

Administration
- Diocese: Cochin Diocese

Clergy
- Bishop: His Beatitude Mor Baselios Joseph Catholicos

Karingachira St. George's Jacobite Syrian Church of Jacobite Syrian Christian Church, built in 722 AD (Makaram 13) by Palathinkal and Maliekal family, is one of the ancient churches of the Syriac Orthodox Church. St. Thomas, one of the twelve apostles of Jesus Christ is the founder of the ancient church in India. Christian writers and historians from the 4th century refer to the evangelistic work of Apostle Thomas in India, and the Indian Christians ascribe the origin of their church to the labours of the apostle in the 1st century.

The church is located near Hill Palace, Thripunitura, Kochi. The church is named after Saint George. The Katthanar (Vicar) of Karingachira was considered the representative of the Nasarani community of the erstwhile Cochin State. During athachamayam, the Katthanar representing the Nasranis, along with Nettur Thangal (representing the Muslims), and Chembil Valia Arayan (representing the fisher folk) accompanied the Maharaja of Cochin State.

== Ceremonies ==
- The Saint Parumala Thirumeni was ordained as a deacon in this church in 1857.
- Ignatius Abded Aloho II Patriarch of Antioch held meeting at Karingachira church in July 1911
- Ignatius Elias III Patriarch Presided meeting of Mor Gregorios Jacobite Students' Movement and other occasions held at on church
- Mor Osthatheos Sleebo and other delegates of Antioch visited this church in Several times
- Malankara Association of Jacobite Syrian Christian Church held on this church at 1935
- This church was elevated as a cathedral by Patriarch Ignatius Zakka I Iwas in 2004.

== Notable visitors ==
- Ignatius Peter IV Patriarch of Antioch
- Geevarghese Gregorios of Parumala
- Ignatius Elias III Patriarch of Antioch
- Osthatheos Sleebo, Delegate of Antioch
- Athanasius Paulose of Aluva
- Anthrayose of Kallada
- Ivanios Hidayathulla
- Gregorius Yuhanon
- Baselios Sakralla III of Aleppo
- Ignatius Abded Aloho II
