= Hill Palace, Kochi =

Coordinates: 9°57′9.5″N 76°21′51.0″E

Hill Palace
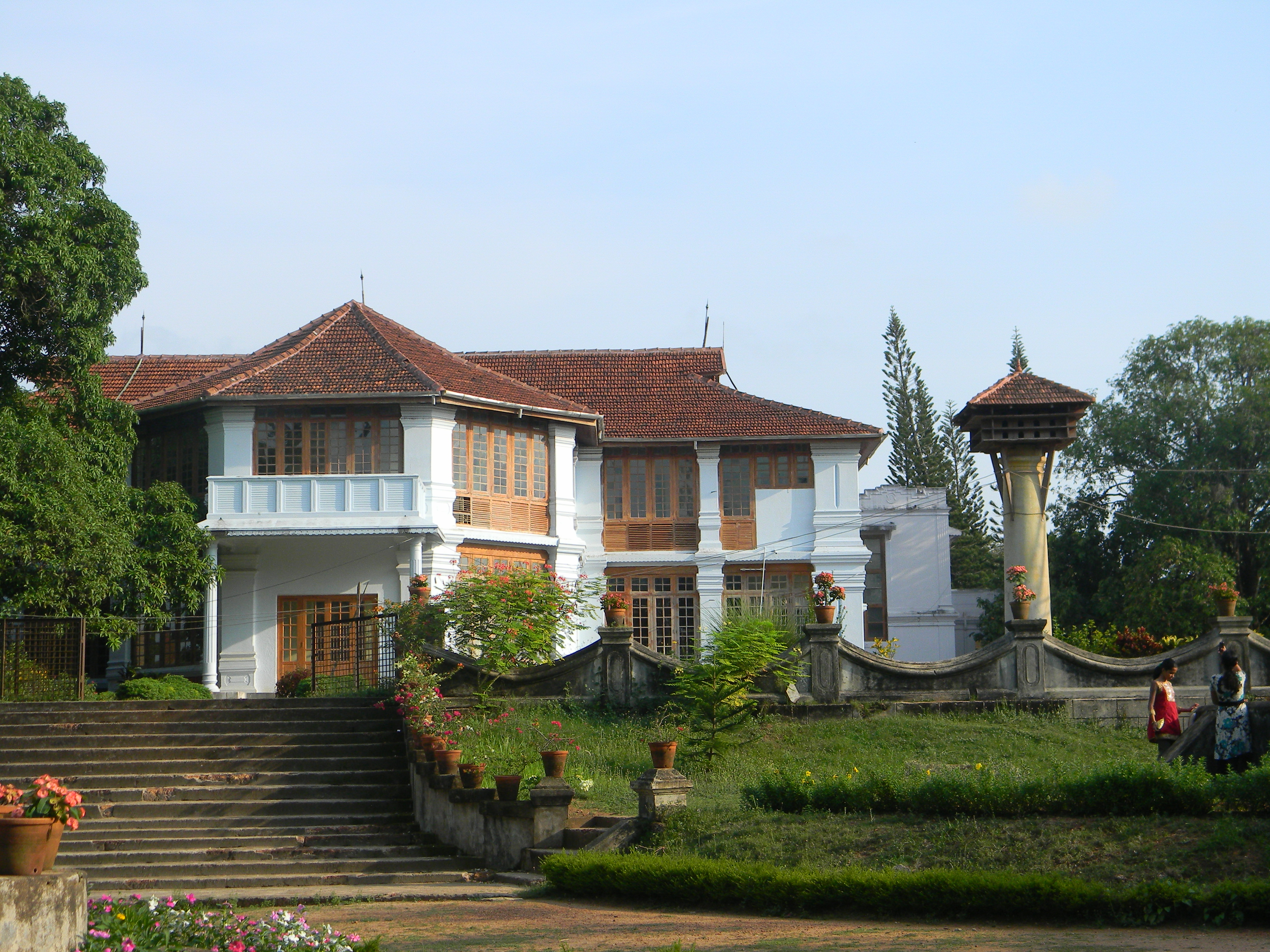
- A view of the palace from its northern side
- Established: 1865
- Location: Tripunithura, Kochi, Kerala, India
- Type: Archeological museum, History museum
- Owner: Government of Kerala
- Public transit access: Road, Rail

Hill Palace is an archaeological museum and palace located in the Tripunithura neighbourhood of Kochi, Kerala. It is the largest archeological museum in the state and was the royal administrative office and official residence of the Cochin Maharaja. Built in 1865, the palace complex consists of 49 buildings spreading across 54 acres (220,000 m^{2}) and built in the traditional architectural style. The complex has an archaeological museum, a heritage museum, a deer park, a pre-historic park and a children's park.

The campus section of the museum is home to several rare species of medicinal plants. Presently, the palace has been converted into a museum by The Kerala State Archaeology Department and is open to the public. The palace is about 10 kilometres (6.2 mi) from the city centre and is reachable by road and by rail.

The Centre for Heritage Studies (CHS), an autonomous research and training institute set up by the Department of Cultural Affairs, of the Government of Kerala also functions at the site. The CHS is designated as the 'Manuscript Conservation Centre' (MCC) and 'Manuscript Resource Centre' (MRC) by the National Mission for Manuscripts.

== History ==
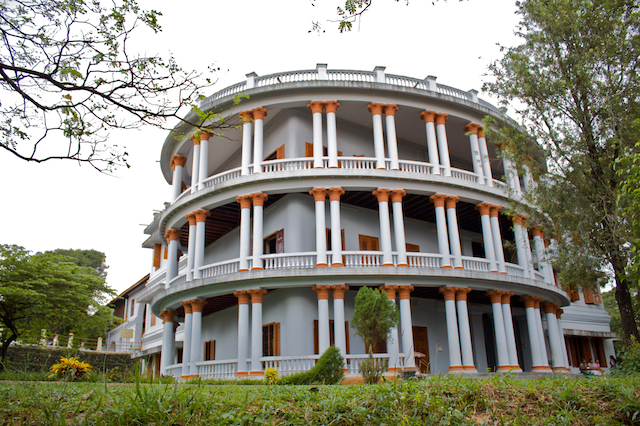
South Block, Hill Palace Museum

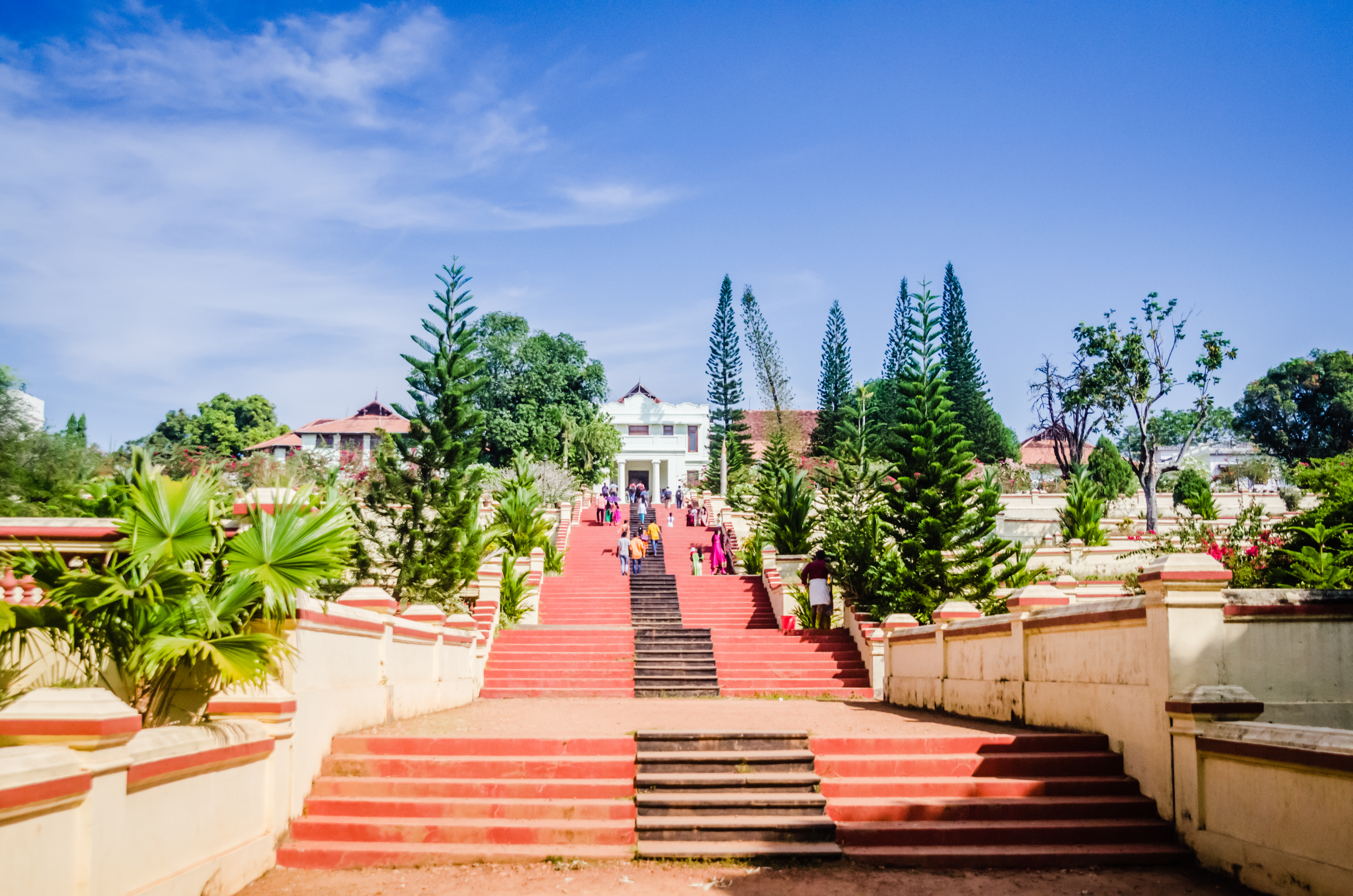
Entrance of Hill Palace

The Hill Palace was built in 1865 by the Maharaja of Cochin and is now the largest archaeological museum in Kerala.

The official capital of the Kingdom of Kochi was previously located in Thrissur, and the royal office of the Maharaja as well as the court were all located in the city. However, as per ritualistic customs, the seat of the queen of Kochi (Penvazhithampuran) was seen as the royal capital, as the Kochi royal family had matrilineal traditions and the queen was regarded as sovereign of the state under whose authority the king ruled. Since 1755, the queen and her retinue lived in Tripunithura, thereby making the city as the official capital. Further, the prince Rama Varma was raised in Tripunithura, thus he preferred to live in that city even after his coronation as king rather than moving to Thrissur. Thus, for his benefit, a royal office was constructed in 1865. It initially started off as a royal office, court building and offices of royal secretaries and nobles of the court, but soon an increasing number of structures were added to the main structure for various purposes. Soon, a residence was also constructed for the king and his immediate family, although other members of the Cochin royal family had their own allocated bungalows and official residences.

The palace was handed over to the government of Kerala by the Cochin royal family, and in 1980, the palace was taken over by the Department of Archaeology and later converted into a museum. It was opened to the public in 1986. The museum and its campus are popular shooting locations for the Malayalam film industry. The horse cart gallery and weapons gallery house numerous historical artifacts.

The museum gardens are also some of the last green refuge of the town. A checklist of fauna found within the gardens, prepared by Sandeep Varma and Gokul Vinayan, has been published under the title 'The Fauna of Hill Palace'.

== Museum ==
The museum displays 14 categories of exhibits, including the Crown and ornaments of erst from the Cochin royal family's reign, paintings, sculptures in stone and marble, weapons, inscriptions and coins. The major share of attractions in the museum were contributed by the Cochin royal family, with some exhibits from the Paliam Devaswom and the Department of Archaeology. The museum collection includes a gold crown embedded with precious stones and many valuable coins, ornaments, majestic beds and samples of epigraphy. The Malayalam movie Manichitrathazhu was shot here in 1993

== In the media ==
The Hill Palace has been the location for many films in Malayalam. Manichitrathazhu is the most famous movie shot at this location, but many filmmakers have utilized this place for shooting purposes. Some popular films shot in the palace include Moonnam Mura (1988), Manichitrathazhu (1993), Kaliyoonjal (1997), Dreams (2000) and Chotta Mumbai (2007).

== Gallery ==
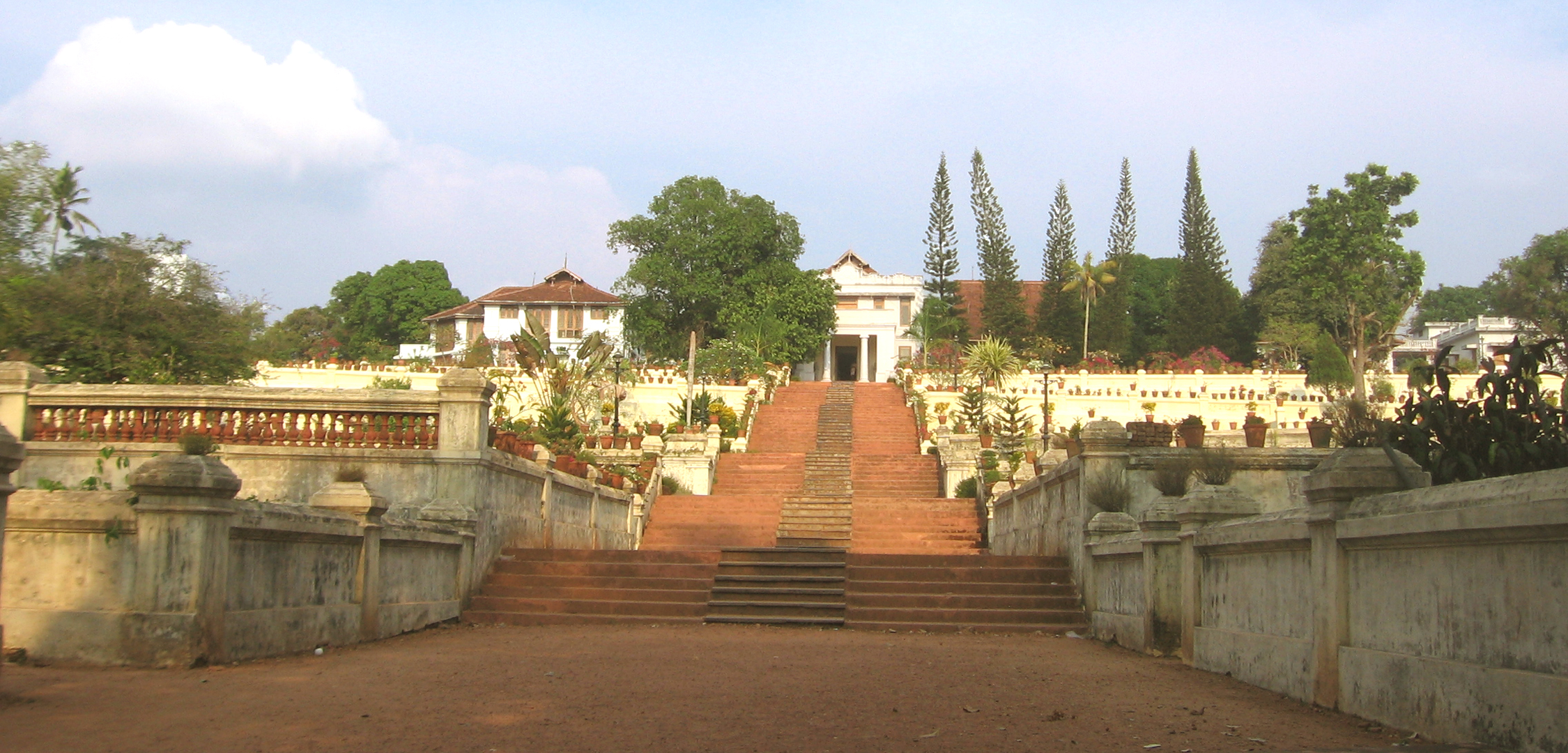

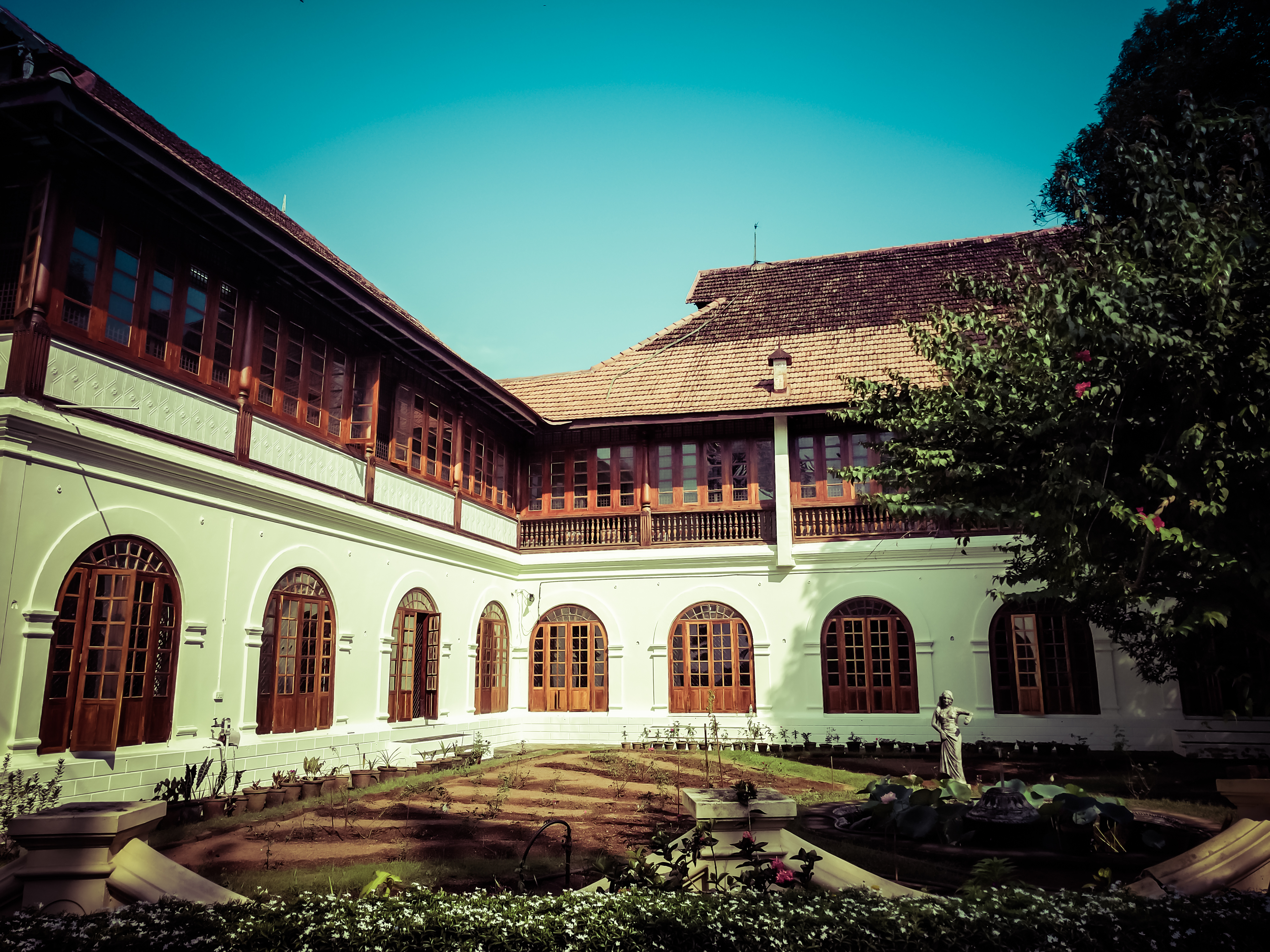

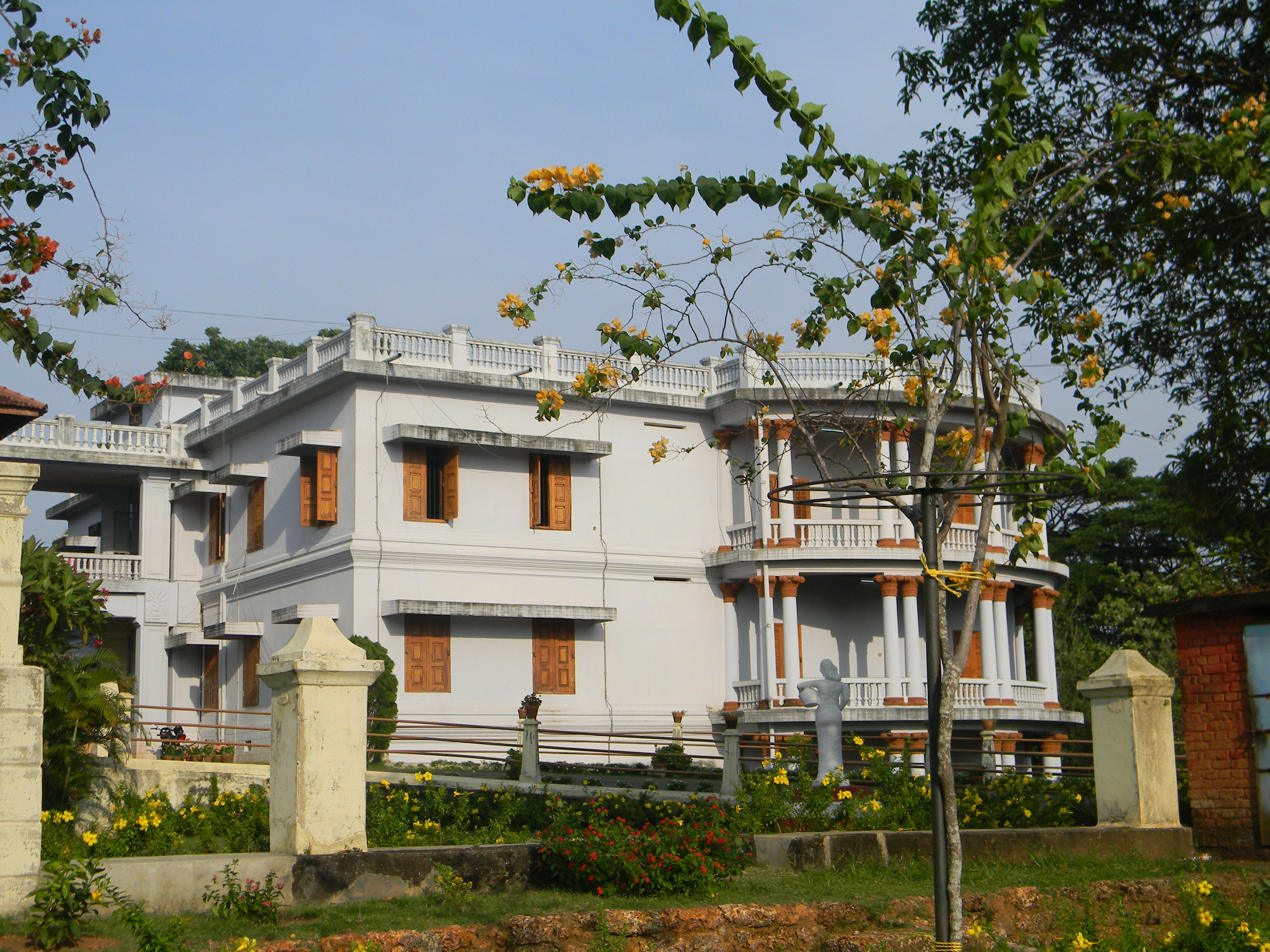

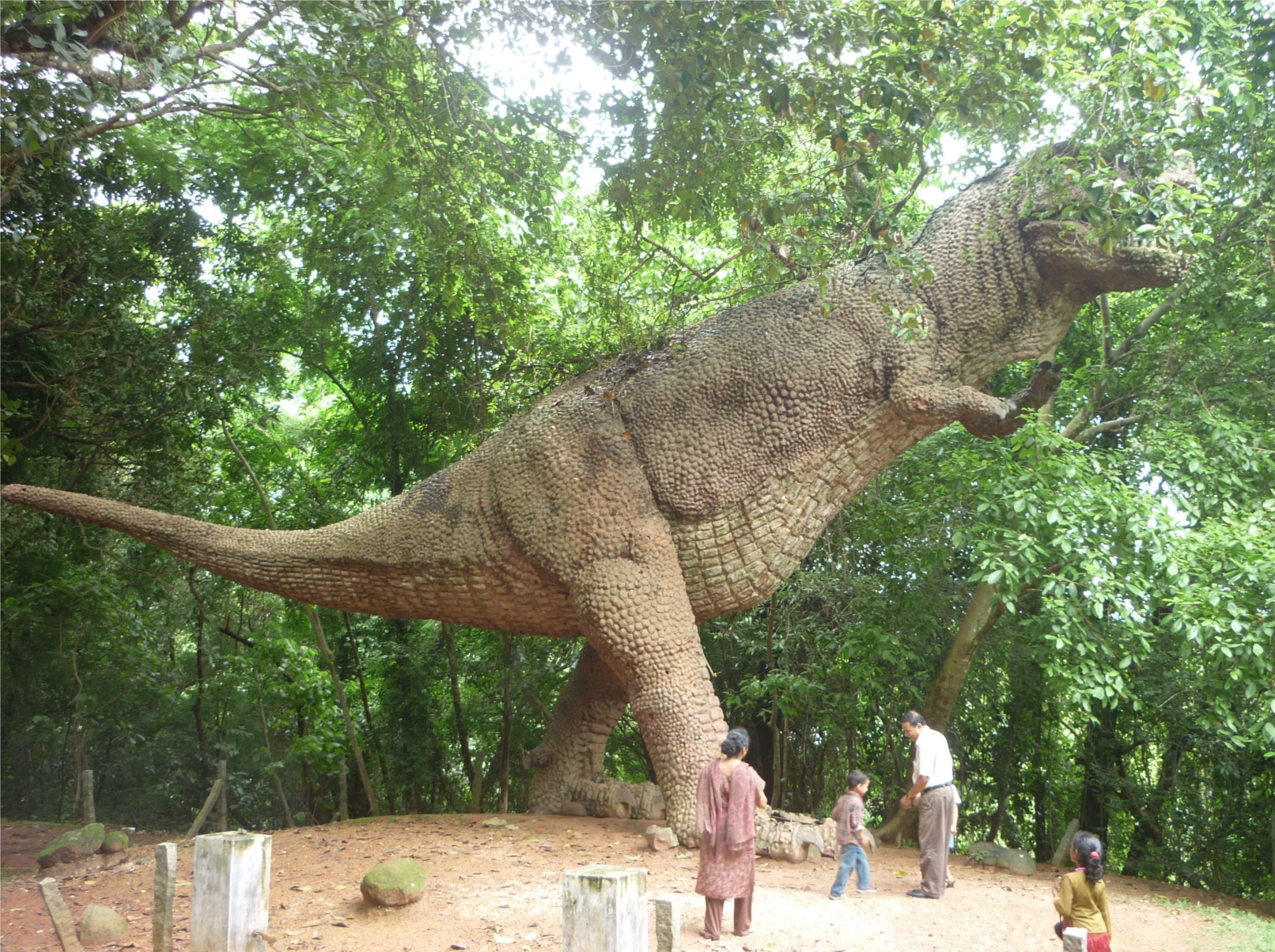

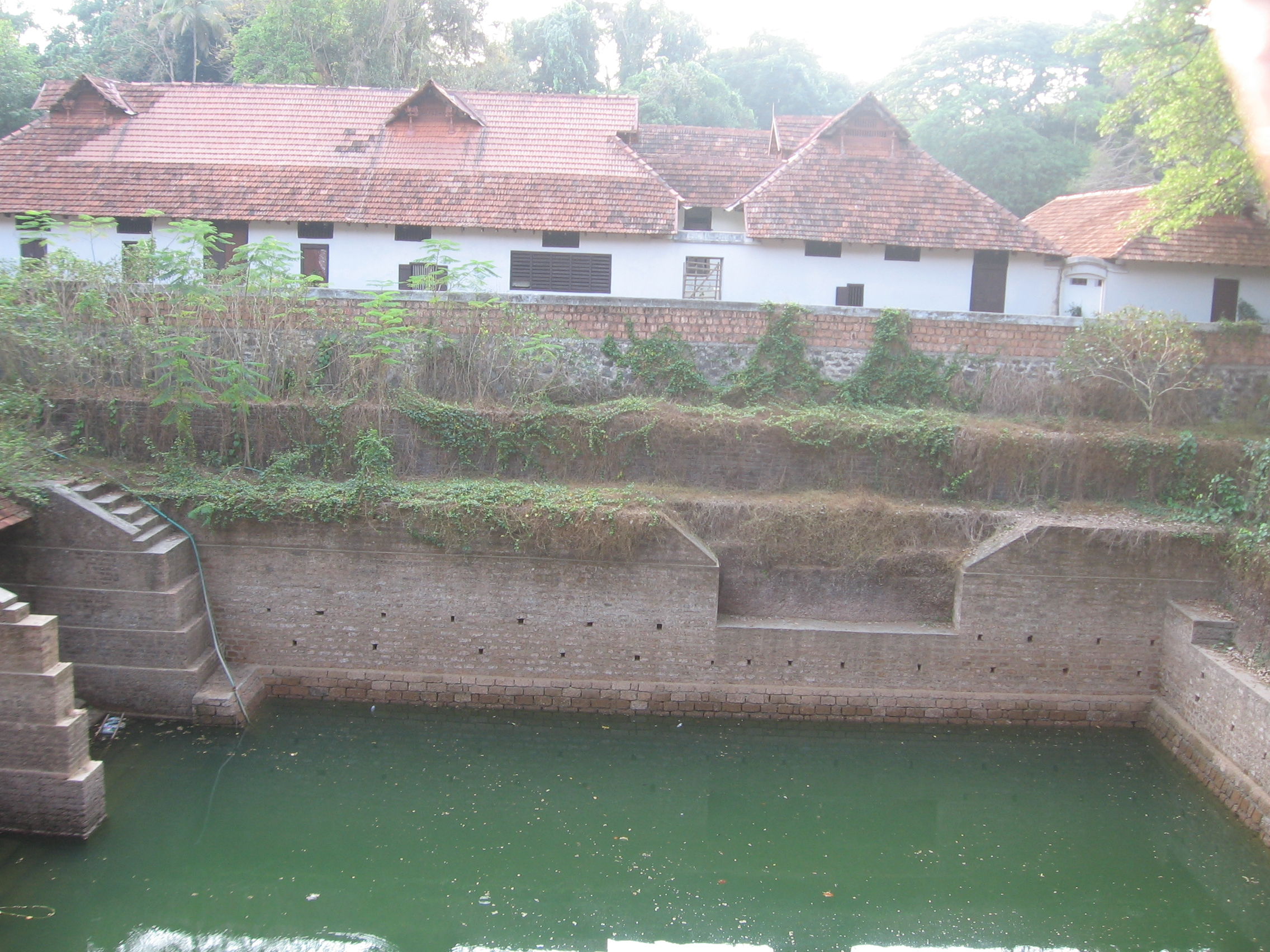

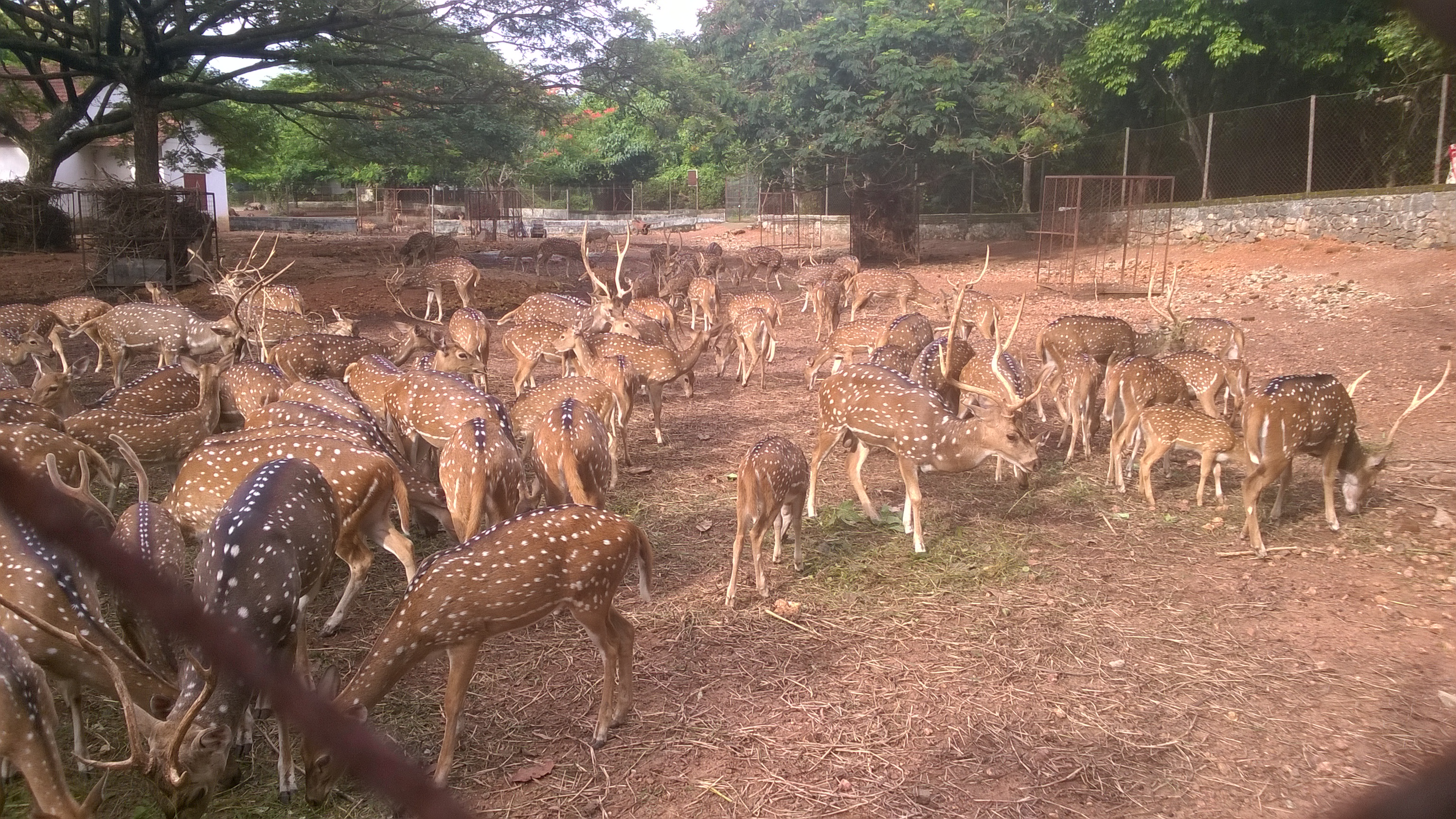

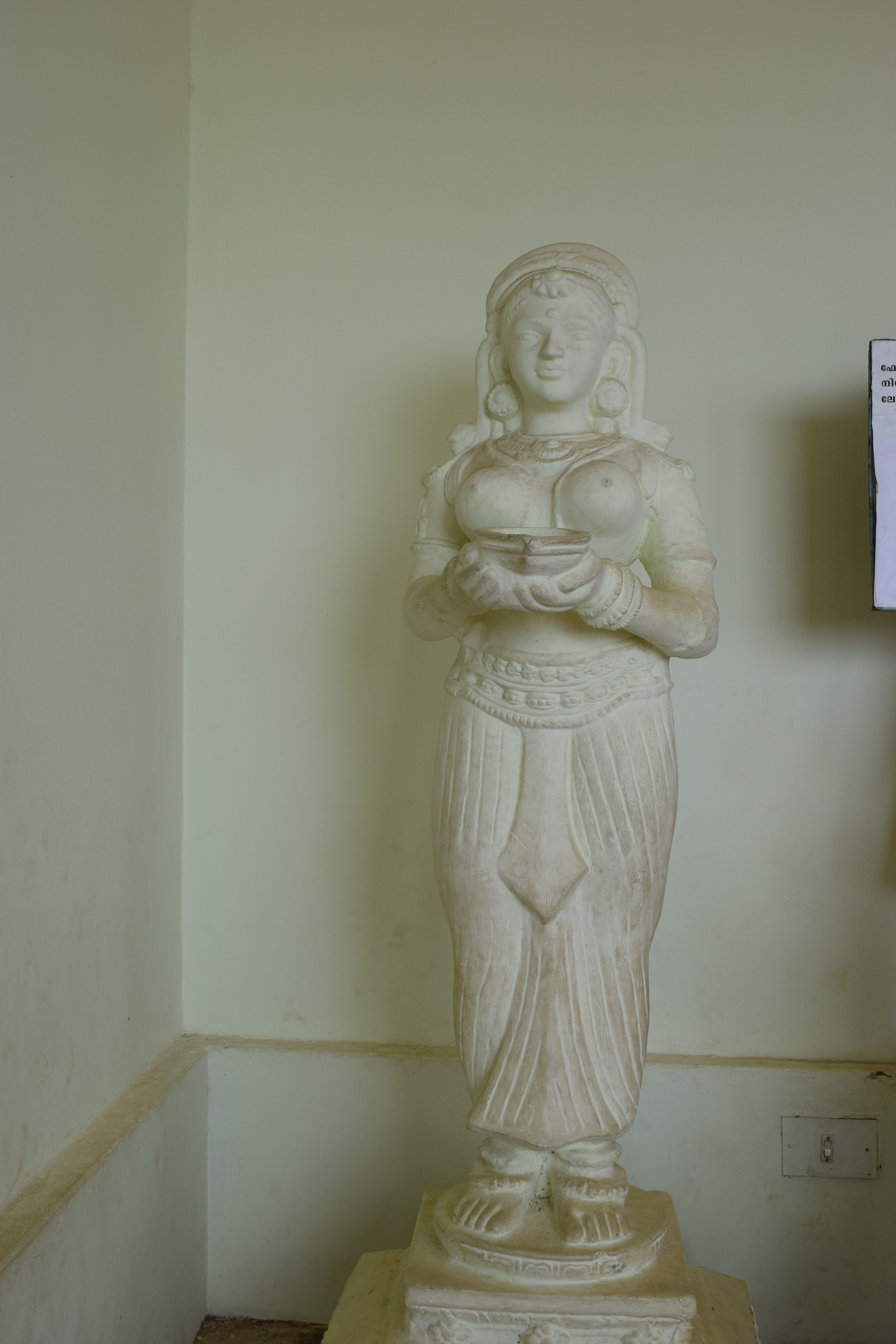

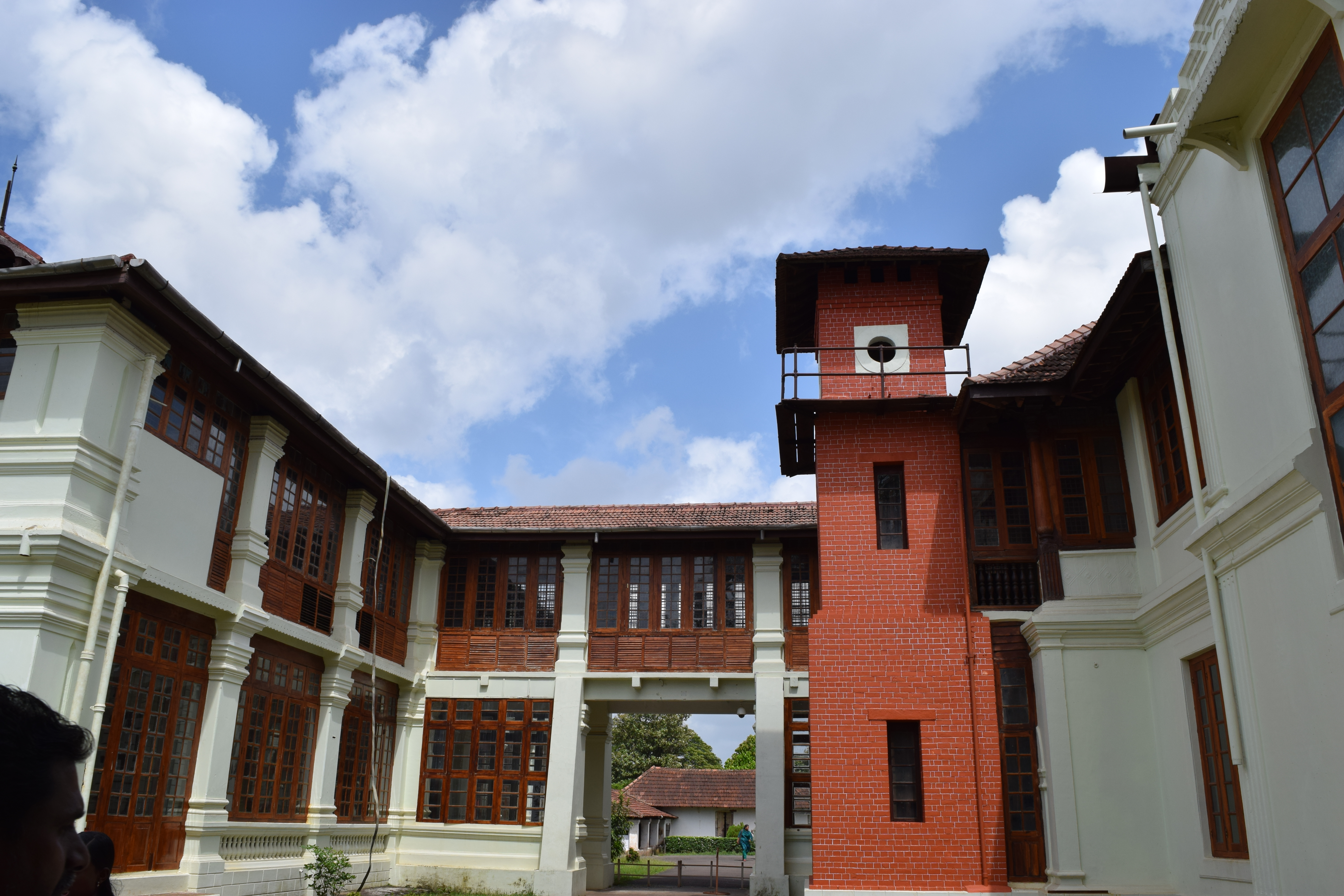

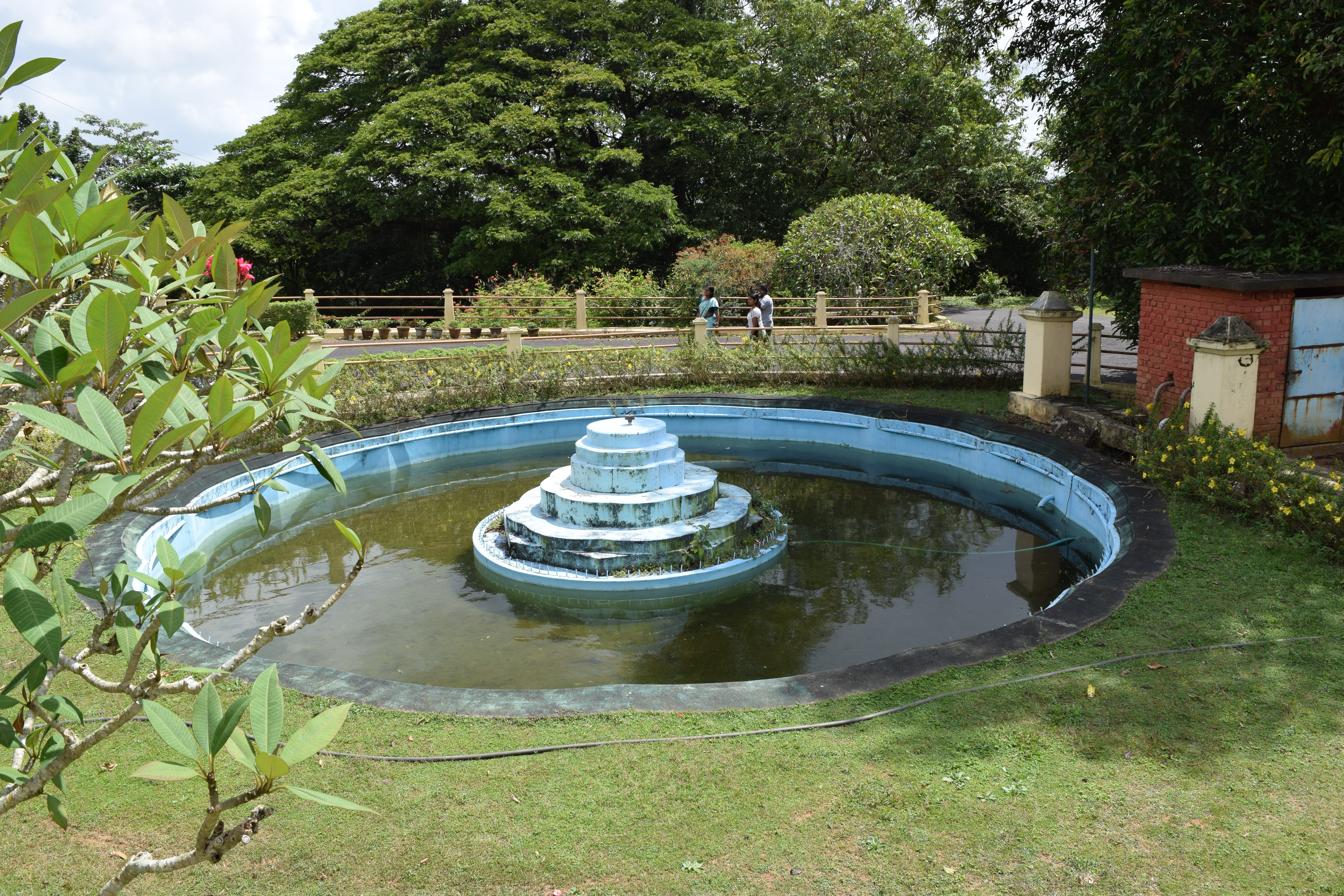

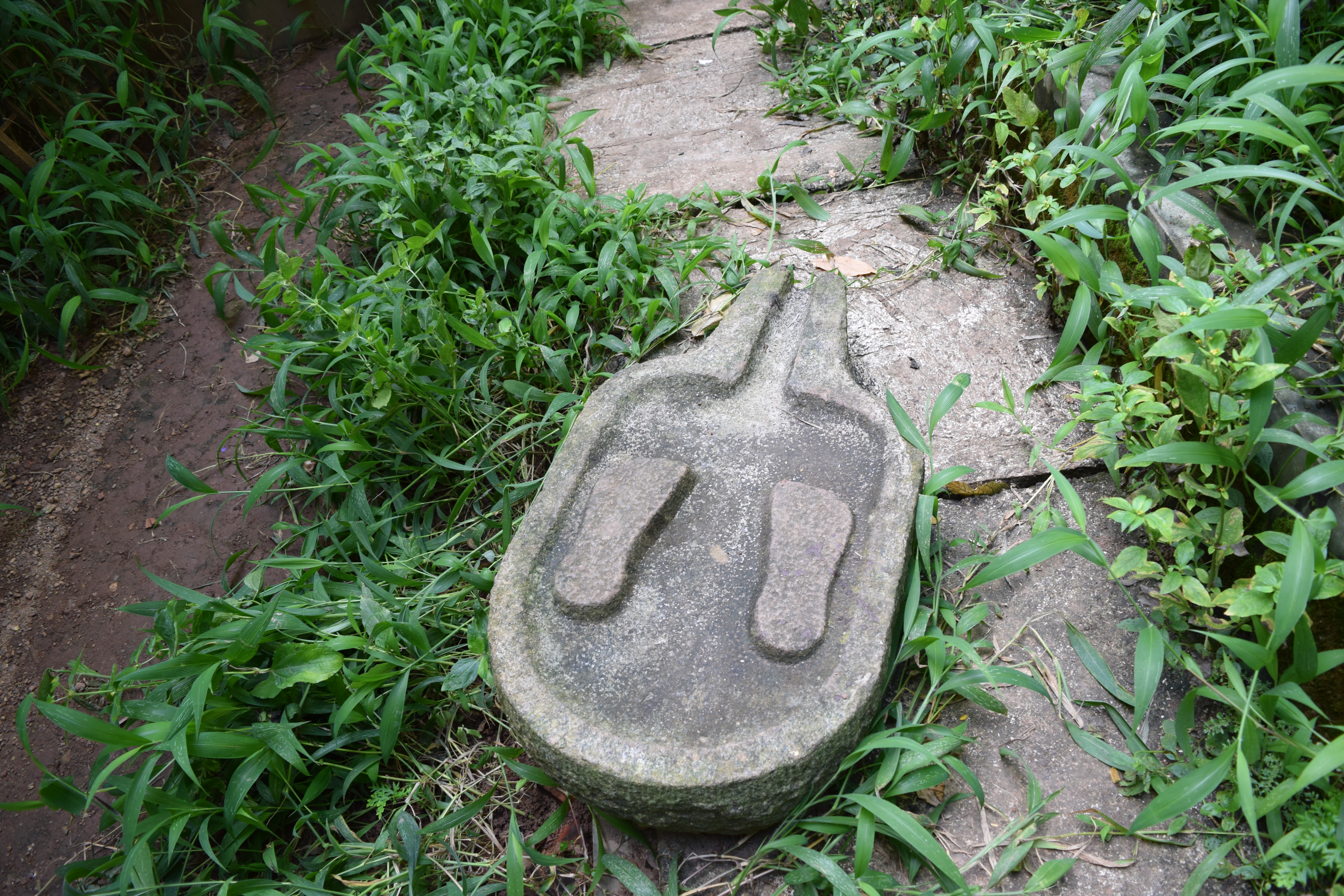

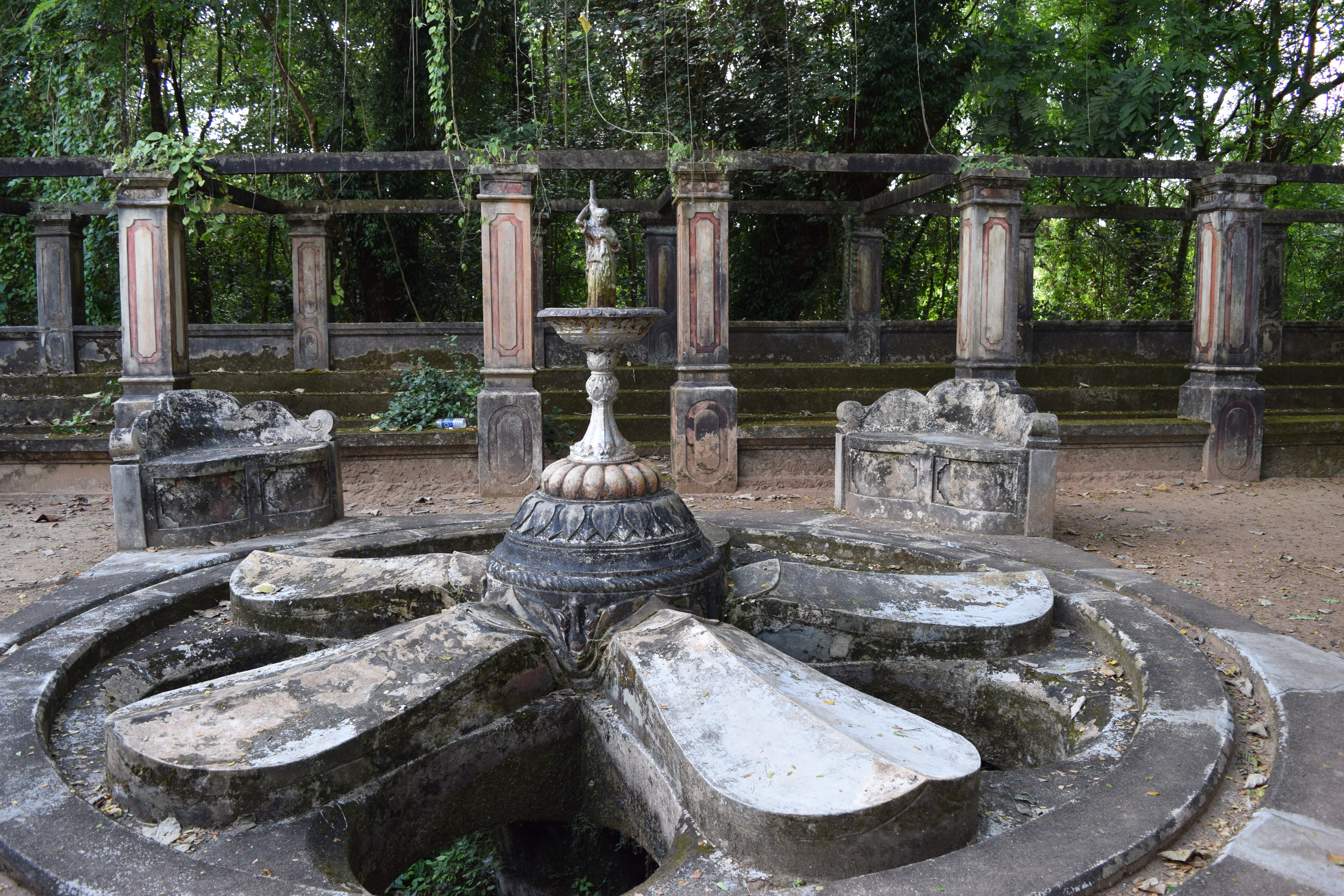

== See also ==
- List of State Protected Monuments in Kerala
- Karingachira Church
- Cochin royal family
- Mattancherry Palace
