= Trikkur =

- village
- Interactive map of Trikkur
- Country: India
- State: Kerala
- District: Thrissur

Population (2011)
  - Total: 13,093

Languages
  - Official: Malayalam, English
- Time zone: UTC+5:30 (IST)
- PIN: 680306
- Vehicle registration: KL 45-

Trikkur is a village in Thrissur district in the state of Kerala, India. It is situated on the eastern bank of Manali river.

== Demographics ==
As of 2011 India census, Trikkur had a population of 13,093 with 6,465 males and 6,628 females.

== Trikkur Mahadeva Temple ==
Trikkur Mahadeva Temple, a protected monument under the Department of Archaeology, Govt of Kerala, is located in this village. Similarly, Mathikkunnu Bhagavathi Temple, located at Mathikkunnu, is also a popular temple in Trikkur.

== Noted residents ==
- Swami Ranganathananda, president of the Ramakrishna Mission
