= Kakkoor =

- Village
- Location in Kerala, India Kakkoor (India)
- Coordinates: 9°53′40″N 76°32′05″E
- Country: India
- State: Kerala
- District: Ernakulam

Languages
  - Official: Malayalam, English
- Time zone: UTC+5:30 (IST)
- Telephone code: 0485
- Vehicle registration: KL-17
- Nearest city: Kochi, Piravom, Koothattukulam, Muvattupuzha

Kakkoor is a village situated in the eastern part of Ernakulam district in Kerala, south of India. Kakkoor is famously known for Kakkoor Kalavayal the agricultural fest conducted every year in the month of Kumbham in the Malayalam calendar.

Kakkoor is situated in Thirumarady Grama Panchayath surrounded by the panchayath's of Pampakuda, Elanji & Marady and also the Municipality of Koothattukulam. Kakkoor is in Pampakuda Block Panchayath and is in Muvattupuzha Thaluk. The Assembly constituency is Piravom and Parliament Constituency is Kottayam. Most of the people in the area are dependent on agriculture for their livelihood. The main crops cultivated are paddy, vanilla, nutmeg, pineapple and rubber.

Nearby towns of Kakkoor are Koothattukulam (8.4 km), Piravom (7.8 km), Muvattupuzha (17.7 km), Pala (30.1 km) and Thodupuzha (27.1 km ). The main cities near are Ernakulam (35.5 km) and Kottayam (43.4 km).

The known places in Kakkoor are Ambaserrykavu Temple, Erumelil Sree Dharma Sastha Temple, Thrippadathirikulangara Temple, Mullavally Siva Sankaranarayana Temple, St. Joseph Catholic Church and St. Mary's Orthodox Church Attinkunnu.

Kakkoor is also known for I.T based industries. The rural smart space project of Kerala Government Technolodge is situated at Kakkoor. It is the first of its kind designed to encourage budding startups in I.T industry.

== History ==
Kakkoor was a part of the Travancore Kingdom and now a part of State of Kerala.

== Transportation ==
=== Road ===
Kakkoor is well connected with a network of roads. The State Highway 42 passes through the center of Kakkoor. The Main Central road (MC Road) connecting Thiruvananthapuram and Angamali is at a distance of 8.4 km and which is connected with SH 42. The KSRTC operates a fleet of Long Distance and short-distance services including Super Fast, Fast Passenger, Limited Stop and Non AC and AC Low Floor buses along with private operators.

The village is well connected with a local network of roads.

=== Railway ===
At present Kakkoor has no railway connectivity. The nearest railway station to Kakkoor are Piravom Road (11.7 km), Ernakulam Junction (35.9 km), Ernakulam Town (38.5 km), Aluva (38.1) and Kottayam (42.8 km).

=== Air ===
The nearest airport to Kakkoor is Cochin International Airport, Nedumbassery (49 km) which is an International airport with flights to various international destinations.

== Healthcare ==
- Govt. Homeopathic Dispensary, Kakkoor
- Primary Health Centre, Thirumarady

== Education ==
- Govt. Vocationsl Higher Secondary School, Thirumarady
- St. Anns Carmel Public School, Thirumarady
- The Adventure Senior Secondary School, Vettimood
- St. Mary's L.P & U.P School, Anchelpetty
- GOVT. LP School Kakkoor
- T.M Jacob Memorial Govt. Arts College, Manimalakunnu
- M.G University college of Nursing, Manimalakunnu

== Kakkoor Kalavayal ==
Kakkoor Kalavayal is a post harvest festival celebrated every year in the month of either February or March. The festival is usually conducted on the month of Kumbham based on Malayalam calendar. This festival is mainly celebrated by the farmers of Kakkoor and surrounding villages. During earlier times this festival was used as a place for exchange and trade of agricultural goods between farmers and traders. The term kalavayal means cattle market.

At present Kalavayal is a main tourist attraction in the map of Kerala. Along with this festival many adventurous events like Kalavandiyottam (Cattle Race), Maramadi, Motocross etc. are conducted. Many foreigners and natives along with people across Kerala come to Kakkoor to become a part of it. Also this festival is an opportunity for photographers to capture this live actions. However, cattle races was recently banned due to concerns raised by animal rights activists who claimed the bulls and other animals were beaten and mistreated by competitors.

This historic festival is also related with two temples in surroundings which holds a major role in this festival. The connected temples are Edapra Bhagavathi Temple, Thirumarady and Ambasserykavu Temple, Kakkoor. It is believed that this two deities are sisters and this is the occasion when they meet each other after a long year. This is celebrated in the Aswathi, Bharani, Karthika & Rohini stars of the Malayalam month Kumbham.

== Places of Worship ==
- Sree Ambasserykavu Temple, Kakkoor
- Mullavali Siva Sankaranarayana Temple, Kakkoor
- Erumelil Sree Dharma Sastha Temple, Kakkoor
- Thripadhathirikulangara Temple, Kakkoor
- St. Joseph Catholic Church, Kakkoor
- St. Mary's Orthodox Church, Attinkunnu
