= Vadakkechira =

Pond in Thrissur, India

- Vadakke Chira
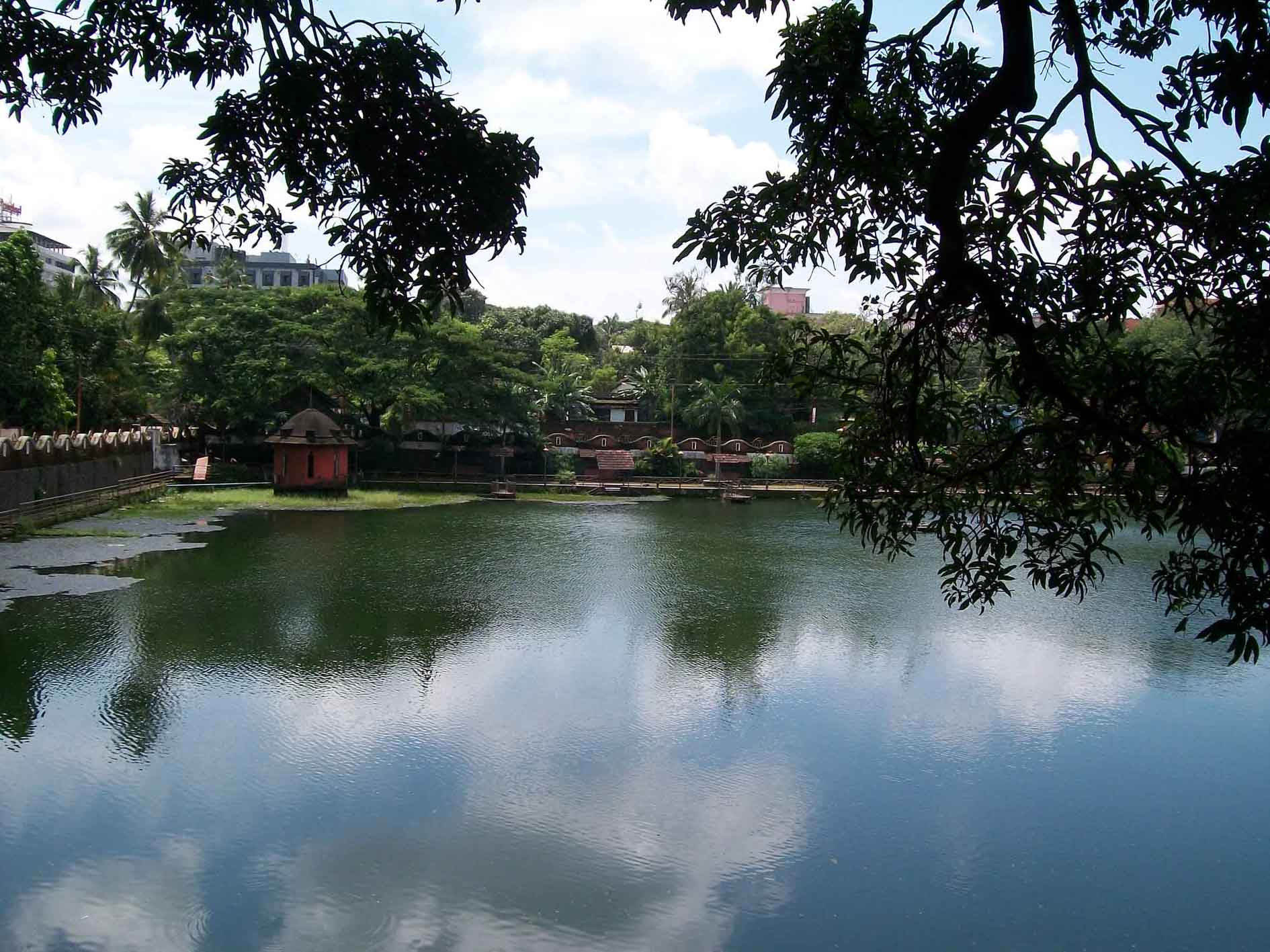
- A view of Vadakkechira pond

- Location within Kerala Location within India
- Location: Thrissur city, Kerala
- Coordinates: 10°31′47″N 76°12′57″E
- Type: Artificial pond
- Basin countries: India
- Surface area: 4 acres (1.6 ha)

Vadakkechira (Malayalam: വടക്കെചിറ) is one of the four oldest ponds in Thrissur city of Kerala in India. It was built by Shakthan Thampuran (1751-1805) and is one of Thrissur's famous landmarks. It is owned by Cochin Devaswom Board.

== History ==
Sakthan Thampuran, Maharaja of Cochin, built four ponds in Thrissur city for water management and irrigation purpose in his regime. They are Vadakkechira, Padinjarechira, Thekkechira and Kizakechira. Members of the Cochin Royal Family and priests of the Ashokeswaram Temple used to have bath at the ghats on the northern side of the pond, and the public at those on other sides. Elephants used to be bathed at ghats on the eastern side. The Kulapparas and ghats for elephants are reminiscent of 18th and 19th century architecture. A walkway is on the southern side of the pond. The re-designed pond has sculptural seats, gateways Padippuras, pools, fountains, a gallery and a rock garden. M.M. Vinod Kumar has re-designed the pond and its surroundings.

== Fauna ==
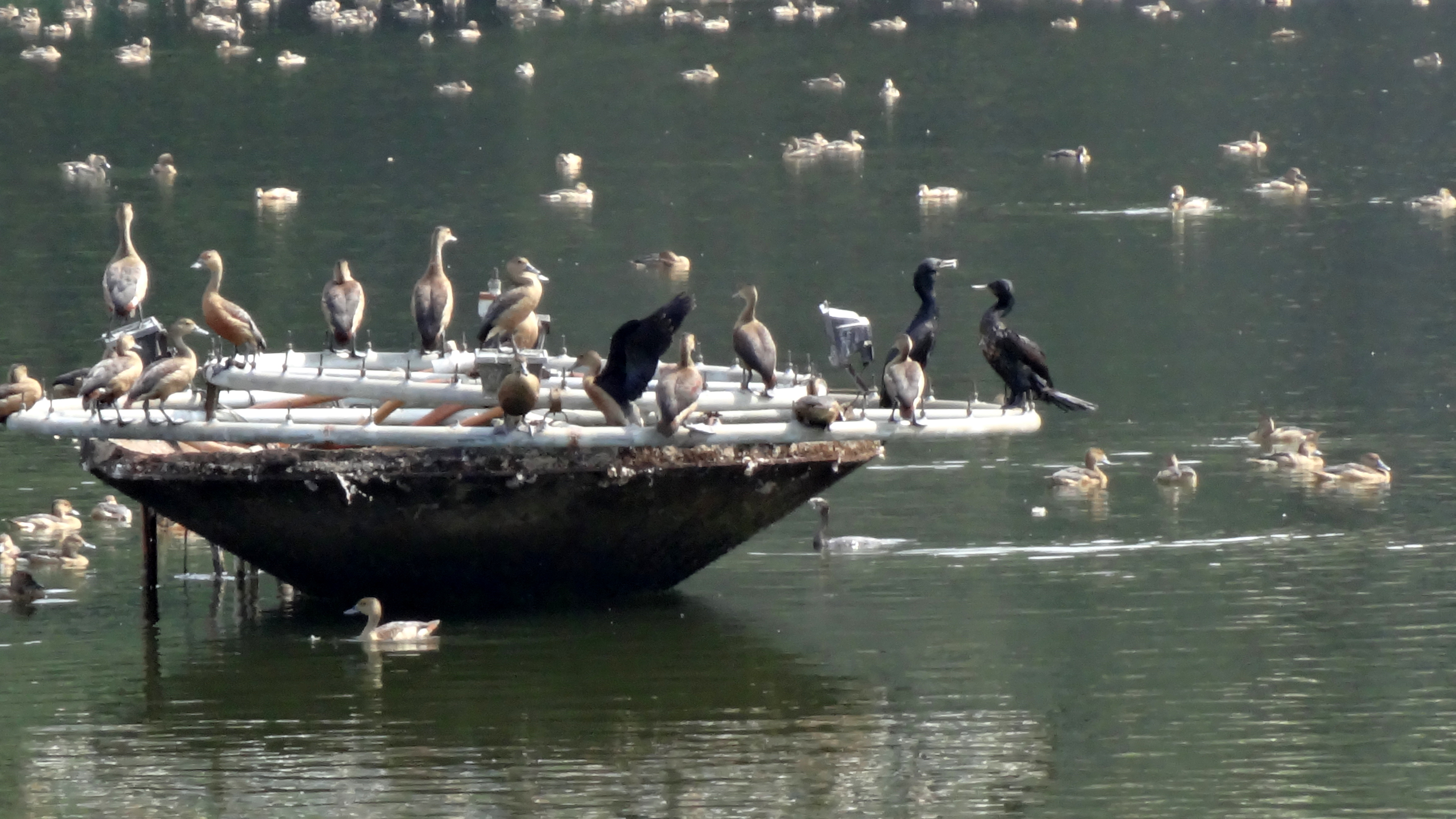
Migratory birds in Vadakkechira

The pond is a four hectare ecosystem complete with plants, birds, sacred groves and butterfly gardens. Vadakkechira is home to many avian species, including small green barbet (Megalaima viridis), white-breasted water hen (Amaurornis phoenicurus), blue rock pigeon (Columba livia), bronze-winged jacana (Metopidius indicus), pond heron (Ardeola grayii), white-browed wagtail(Motacilla maderaspatensis), common kingfisher (Alcedo atthis), house sparrow (Passer domesticus), common myna (Acridotheres tristis), little cormorant (Microcarbo niger), lesser whistling teal (Dendrocygna javanica) and little grebe (Podiceps ruficollis).

== Water supply ==
In 1983, when drought struck Thrissur city, then Minister M.P.Gangadharan with help of Kerala Water Resources Department cleaned the pond over a time of one month. In 1985, a water supply system was constructed by spending Rs 23 lakhs form Vadakkechira pond to supply water to Thekkinkadu Maidan and Swaraj Round, Thrissur by Kerala Water Resources Department. At the same time, a park was also set up near the pond. Later, the project was handed over to Thrissur Municipal Corporation.
