= Kattil Madam Temple =

Shrine in Kerala, in India

Kattil madam temple
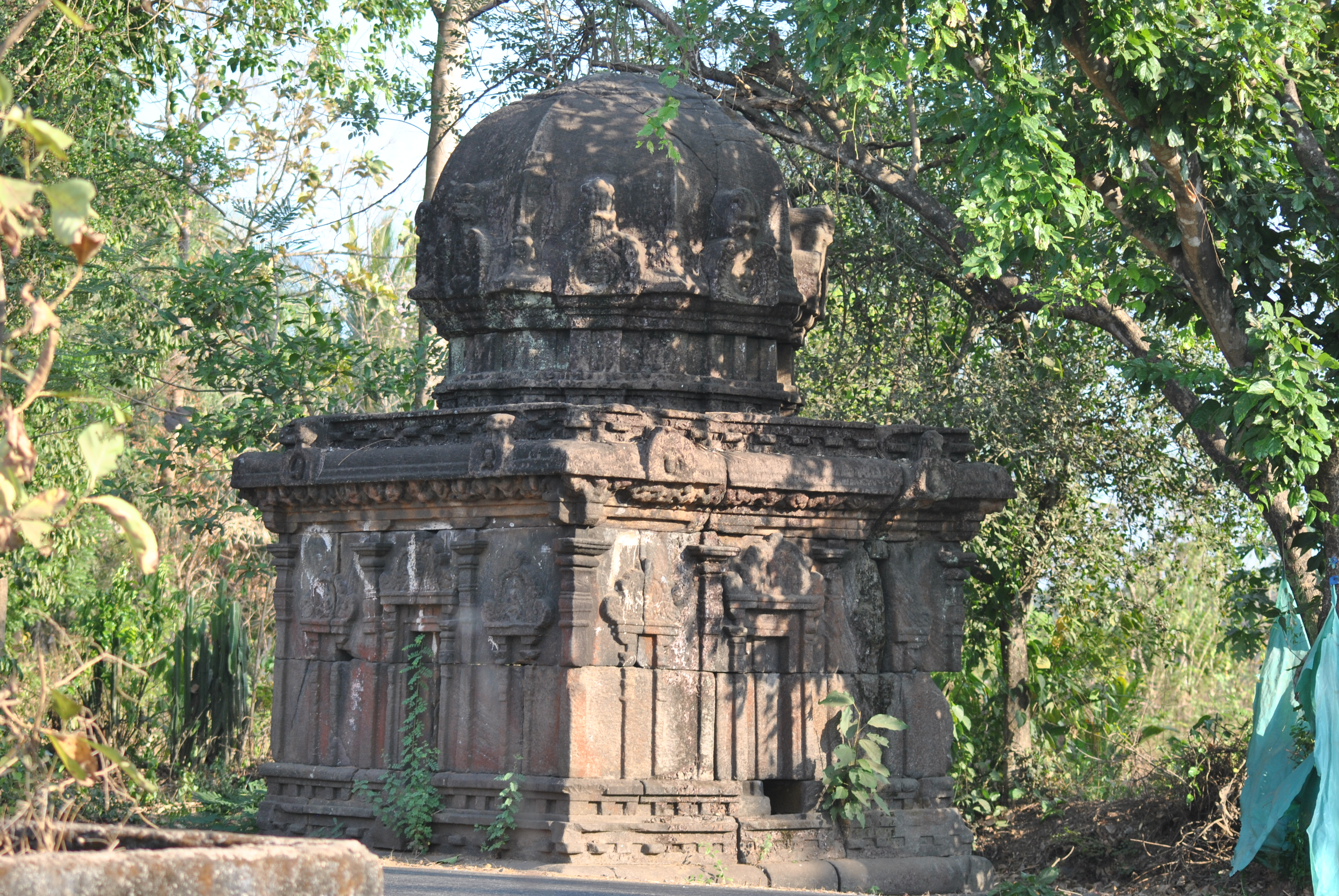
- Kattilmadam temple

Religion
- Affiliation: Jainism
- Sect: Digambar

Location
- Location: Palakkad District, Kerala
- Interactive map of Kattil madam temple
- Coordinates: 10°46′14.4″N 76°09′12″E

Architecture
- Established: 9th century
- Temple: 1

Kattil Madam Temple is a dilapidated shrine in the Palakkad district in Kerala, India. It is thought to be a Jain temple built around the ninth or tenth centuries AD and is situated on the Pattambi Guruvayur road.

== Architecture ==
The architecture is of Dravidian style with Chola and Pandya influences. The temple features an alpa-vimana.

The temple is protected by the Archaeological Survey of India.
