= Elanad =

Elanad Illacha nadu Elanadu
- Small Town(Class IV)
- Location in Kerala, India Elanad (India)
- Coordinates: 10°37′0″N 76°23′0″E
- Country: India
- State: Kerala
- District: Thrissur

Population (2011)
  - Total: 10,284

Languages
  - Official: Malayalam, English
- Time zone: UTC+5:30 (IST)
- PIN: 680586
- Telephone code: 04884
- Vehicle registration: KL-48
- Nearest city: Thrissur, Vadakencherry, Ottapalam, Shoranur, Wadakkanchery, Palakkad, Alathur, Chelakkara, Pazhayannur
- Lok Sabha constituency: Alathur
- Vidhan Sabha constituency: Chelakkara
- Panchayath: Pazhayannur

Elanad is a small town in Thrissur district in the Indian state of Kerala.

The Kaliyaroad Nercha, though is celebrated in a Muslim Mosque, the Nercha is taken by all castes and communities. The Thendankavil Ucharal Vela(Elanad vela) is being celebrated by all. There are Christians and Muslims who offer their services during the Vela celebrations. Similarly in the Pulipuram Ayyapan Vilakku Utsavam, all communities come together and celebrate it with full enthusiasm .Elanad perunnal is also nowadays become popular for Religious harmony.

== Economy ==
The primary economy is agriculture, with terrain that is slightly hilly with highly verdant forests and rubber plantations. Textiles made in Elanad are supplied to cloth distributors in Thrissur, Palakkad and Kochi. Elanadu Milk pvt Limited is a Keralan milk entrepreneur situated in Elanad with around 500 workers. Many people from this place nowadays working at Gulf Countries and Europe, this also a powerful source for economy.

== Education ==
- St Johns High School, Ramanchetty
- G.U.P. School
- A.L.P. School
- Sanjos Central School
- Holy Family Nursery School
- Kaliaroad Jaram School
- Akshara Education centre
- A.L.P.S, Vennur
- St:Josephs H.S pangarapilly

== Festivals ==
- Elanad Vela (February-10&11)[ഉച്ചാരൽ താലപൊലി മഹോത്സവം, This festival is one of the famous&crowded festival in thrissur district, vela is starting from thendankavu baghavathy temple and ended at kottaram bhagavathy temple. 10-15 elephants participated in this festival. ]
- Kaliya-Road Nercha (February/March) [കാളിയാറോഡ് നേർച്ച, it's a well-known festival in Kerala. It is an example for community friendship. around 60+ elephants participate in this festival. Kaliya-Road is 3.5 km from Elanad Town & 10 km from chelakkara town]
- Elanad പെരുന്നാൾ (April 22,23,24)[എളനാട് പെരുന്നാൾ, this festival is celebrated at St Mary's Orthodox church. Situated at Elanad town, the popularity of this festival increased in recent years]
- Pulipuram Ayyappan Vilakku (10 December)[എളനാട് പുലിപ്പുറം വിളക്ക്,this festival is taken place at pulipuram ayyappan temple, located around 2 km away from Elanad Town]
- Manchadi nercha/palaparambu fest(January)[മാഞ്ചാടി നേർച്ച,this festival is celebrated at manchadi juma masjid,located at around 5 km from Elanad town 8.5 km away from pazhayannur town. this nercha is the one of the famous nercha that celebrated at thrissur district ]
- Mor Ignathious Elias Simhasana Pally Valiya Perunal(7 & 8 January)
- St.George Jacobite Syrian Church, perunal(Jan 27 & 28)
- Vennur Mundiyan Kavu Vela ( February)
- Kodakkadi Muthi Vela (April)
- Thirumani vishu vela(April)
- Narikundu Nercha (January )

== Religious facilities ==
=== Churches ===
- St. Mary's Orthodox Syrian Church
- Mor Ignathious Elias Simhasana Church Kunnumpuram Elanad
- St.George Jacobite Syrian Church, Thrikkanaya
- St. Ann's R.C. Church,
- St. Joseph's Malankara Church,
- Elanad Fellowship Pentecostal Church
- Indian Pentecostal Church,
- Indian Pentecostal Church (God),
- Brethren Church.

=== Temples ===
- Thendankavil Bhaghavathi Temple,
- Elanad Siva Temple
- Pulipuram Ayyappan Temple,
- Kottaram Bhaghavathi Temple,
- Kizhakkumuri Siva Temple,
- Vennur Mundiyankavu Bhaghavathi Temple.
- Mundian Kavu (Near Kottaram Bhagavathi Temple)
- Kodakkadi Muthi Temple

=== Mosques ===
- Kaliyaroad Juma Masjid
- Elanad Al-Badriyya Juma Masjid
- Kizhakkumuri Juma Masjid
- Thrikkanaya Masjid
- Colony Noorul Huda Sunny Juma Masjid
- Ramanchetty Juma Masjid
