= Nayathod =

Village in Ernakulam District, Kerala, India

Nayathod or Nayathode is a village near nedumbassery in Ernakulam district in the Indian state of Kerala. It is the birthplace of the Malayalam poet G. Sankara Kurup.
