= Thirumarady =

- village
- Location in Kerala, India Thirumarady (India)
- Coordinates: 9°51′0″N 76°34′0″E
- Country: India
- State: Kerala
- District: Ernakulam

Languages
  - Official: Malayalam, English
- Time zone: UTC+5:30 (IST)
- PIN: 686662 1/5
- Telephone code: 0485
- Vehicle registration: KL-17
- Nearest city: Koothattukulam, Piravom
- Literacy: 100%
- Lok Sabha constituency: Kottayam

Thirumarady is situated in the eastern part of Ernakulam District in Kerala, South India. Thirumarady is the headquarters of Thirumarady Grama Panchayath which won an award for the "Best Panchayat in the State" two times for its commendable achievements in the rural area.

Neighboring Panchayats are Koothattukulam, Pampakuda , Elanji and Marady. Nearby Towns are Koothattukulam (6 km), Piravom (12 km), Muvattupuzha (18 km) Palai (24 km) and Thodupuzha (22 km). Nearby Cities are Eranakulam (50 km) and Kottayam (45 km). Thirumarady is in Pampakuda Block and Muvattupuzha Taluk. Assembly constituency is Piravom and Parliament Constituency is Kottayam. Most of the people are engaged in agriculture for their livelihood, viz Rubber, Paddy, Coconut and Vanilla.

The known places in Thirumarady are St. Mary's Catholic Church, St. Joseph's church Kakkoor, Mahadeva Temple, Edaprakkavu Bhagavati Temple, Govt. Institutions like Panchayat Office, Village Office, Post Office (Pin Code – 686662), Primary Health Centre, Veterinary Clinic, Krishi Bhavan, Village Extension Office, Public Library & Vocational Higher Secondary School.

Kakkoor, Mannathoor, Oliyappuram, Vadakara and Edayar are the neighboring areas. Kakkoor is a village which is 2 km away from Thirumarady. "Kakkoor Kalavayal" is a key event in the tourism map of Kerala. This is a post-harvest festival celebrated by the farmers of Kakkoor and surrounding villages. The main highlight of this festival is the Cattle Market which is the literal meaning of "Kalavayal". The centuries-old festival is also connected to some local myths. It is believed that the deities of the Edapara (Thirumarady) and Ambassery (Kakkoor) Bhagavathis are sisters and both meets each other once in a year. The Kakkoor Kalavayal Festival reminds their annual meeting which celebrates in the Aswathi, Bharani, Karthika & Rohini stars of the Malayalam month Kumbham (Feb-March).
