= Buddhism in Kerala =

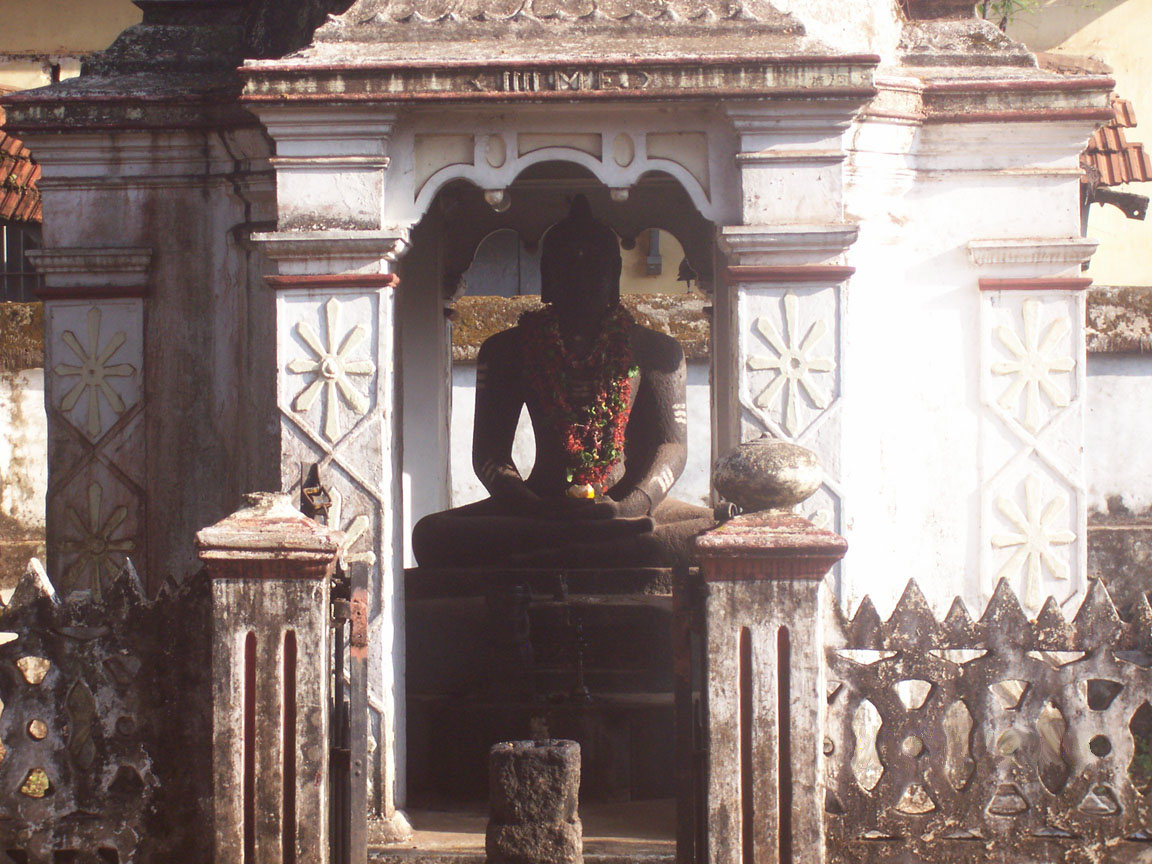

Although Buddhism in Kerala has almost disappeared, historians believe it was influential in pre-modern times, and its cultural impact is still visible in Kerala's culture.

Direct evidence for a Buddhist presence in ancient Kerala during the Iron Age or early historic period is lacking; however, it is plausible that Buddhist ideas reached parts of Kerala connected by trade routes as early as the 3rd century BCE. Notably, a potsherd inscribed with the Brahmi graffiti 'sramana', dating to approximately the 2nd century CE, was discovered at the ancient port of Pattanam (North Paravur) in central Kerala. The medieval Tamil epic poem Manimekalai, associated with the Malabar Coast, contains detailed references to Buddhist philosophy and practices. Local traditions and relics further suggest a Buddhist presence, such as the Legend of Pallibana Perumal, who is believed to have converted to Buddhism and is associated with temples in the Kottayam and Alappuzha regions.

Several prominent Hindu temples in present-day Kerala are thought to have originally been Buddhist shrines. In addition, a considerable number of Buddha images — mostly from the Alappuzha and Kollam regions — have been discovered across the state. A well-known Buddhist vihara, called Sri Mulavasa, is believed to have been located somewhere along the Alappuzha coast. Epigraphic and literary evidence indicates that this temple was patronised by local Kerala rulers, such as the Ay family and the Ezhimala rulers, during the early medieval period. In Kerala, Buddhism was largely absorbed into Hinduism, with many cultural practices — such as the Kuthirakettu and the Kettukazhcha — believed to be influenced by Buddhist traditions. Buddhism perhaps played a major role in promoting education and literacy in Kerala, with viharas serving as centres of learning. The widespread popularity of the traditional Ayurveda in Kerala is often regarded as a legacy of Buddhism. The celebrated Kerala poet Kumaran Asan (1871 – 1924) was strongly shaped by Buddhist philosophy, which is evident in his works Karuna, Chandala Bhikshuki, and Sri Buddha Charitham.

== History ==
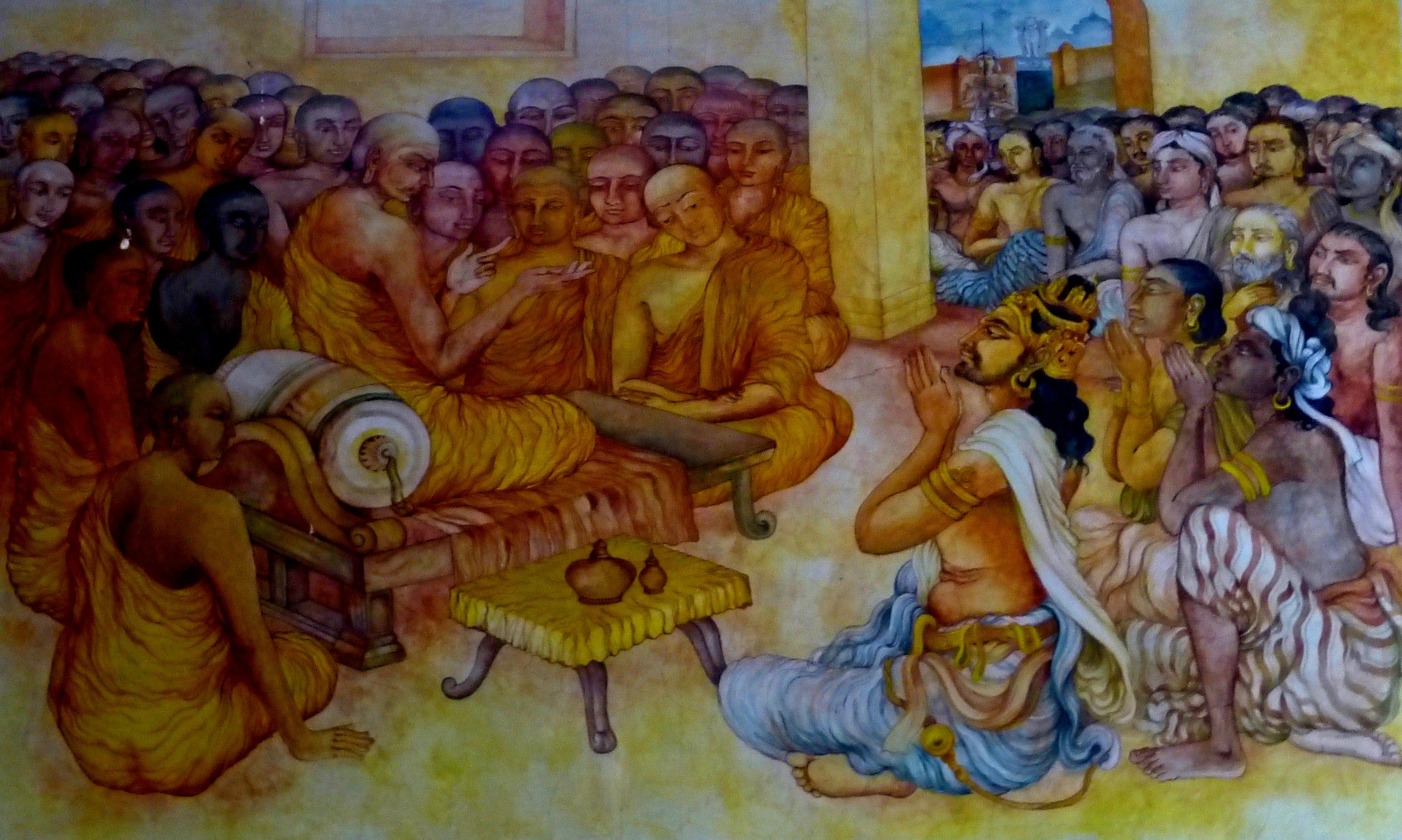
Ashoka and Monk Moggaliputta-Tissa at the Third Buddhist Council. Nava Jetavana, Shravasti.

The Cheras are referred to as Keralaputras in the inscriptions of Ashoka. This may have been the sons of Chera or the King of Chera who was considered a saint and described as Buddha. In any case, the early kings of Kerala were converts to Buddhism and Jainism.

The oldest and most reliable document linking Kerala to Buddhism is the Dharma inscriptions carved by Emperor Ashoka on the Girnar rock in Gujarat. It says:

In all the lands conquered by the Devapriyan and Priyadarshi kings, two types of treatment were practiced in the neighboring Cholas, Pandyas, Satyaputras, Keralaputras, Tamraparniyars, the Greek king Antiochian, and in the kingdoms of Antioch, and their kingdoms. For humans and animals.

—

BCE Ashoka's inscriptions show that Buddhism existed in Kerala and other parts of South India as early as the 2nd century. Theravada Buddhism reached Kerala in the 3rd century. The discovery of Buddha statues at Kozhikode, Mavelikkara, Karumadi, Karunagapally, Maruthurkulangara, Bharanikkavu, Pallikkal and Kottapuram is a case in point.

Emperor Ashoka sought to spread the message of Buddhism throughout India even before preaching in countries overseas. This is stated in the Muski inscriptions. The name of Kerala is not mentioned but Kerala will be included in it as it is spread all over India. There are records of hospitals being set up, wells being dug and medicinal and chola trees being planted. The Mahavamsa, a Buddhist chronicle, records that the Buddha himself visited South India and Ceylon more than once. The monks who came to Kerala to spread Buddhism did not come only from Sri Lanka but on the contrary, Buddhists came to Kerala through the disciples of Mahasangharakshithan, a prominent Buddhist teacher sent by Ashoka to propagate his religion in Gujarat and Maharashtra.

Not only the Hinayana people but also the Mahayana and Vajrayana theorists grew up in Kerala. AD Meghavarnan, who ruled Sri Lanka from 240 to 253, and Makala, who ruled from 253 to 275, were the ones who gave the opportunity to the Mahayana monks. However, during the reign of King Godakadayan from 305 to 316, 60 Mahayana Buddhist monks were deported on charges of heresy. All of them came and settled in Kerala. All these 60 sages worked tirelessly for the rise of Mahayana Buddhism in Kerala.

Works of Sangha period refer to the efforts made by monks to spread the Buddhist message. The Manimekhalai is a Buddhist work.According to a 1927 thesis of Rao Bahadur Krishnaswāmi Aiyangar, the Manimekalai contains "nothing that may be regarded as referring to any form of Mahayana Buddhism, particularly the Sunyavada as formulated by Nagarjuna". In contrast, in 1978, C.N. Kandaswami stated there is a lot of internal evidence that "Manimekalai explains Mahayana Buddhism, and champions its cause". The most famous Buddhist temple in South India was in Vanchi. Arguments are still being made as to whether this Vanchi is in Thiruvanchikulam or in Kodungallur. Legend has it that a Pallibanaperumal from Kerala left the country as a Buddhist monk. Related to this legend are the Kilirur Temple in Kottayam Taluk and the Nilamperur Temple in Alappuzha Taluk. There are monuments of Pallibanaperumal in both the temples.

Many temples such as Kilirur, Kuttamperur, Kodungallur and Arthunkal are believed to have been Buddhist temples at one time. A meditation statue of Buddha has been found at the Paruvassery Durga Temple in Thrissur. Similarly, many Buddhist statues found in Kunnathoor, Karunagappilly taluks, Mavelikkara and Ambalapuzha taluks show the spread of Buddhism in Kerala.

The decline of Buddhism began in the early 8th century. It can be seen from the descriptions of the Chinese travelers that it began to weaken by the seventh century. However, the poems in Tirunizhal mala show which was written in the 12th century, show that Kerala was still not delineated under the chathurvarnya system. With the introduction of Brahmanism, the kings turned against Buddhism. As a result, the influence of Buddhism gradually waned. During the reign of Vaishnava Kulasekara, Buddhism almost completely disappeared in the 11th century.

Sree Moolavasam (near Thrikkunnapuzha) was a famous Buddhist center in Kerala. It is said that the Ay king Vikramaditya Varaguna protected the famous Sreemoolavasam Buddhist pilgrimage center. He donated a large piece of land to the temple. The Mangalacharana in the Sasana, which glorifies the Buddha and Dharma, is remarkable. However, by the 10th century, the center had lost its name.

== Buddha Statues in Kerala ==
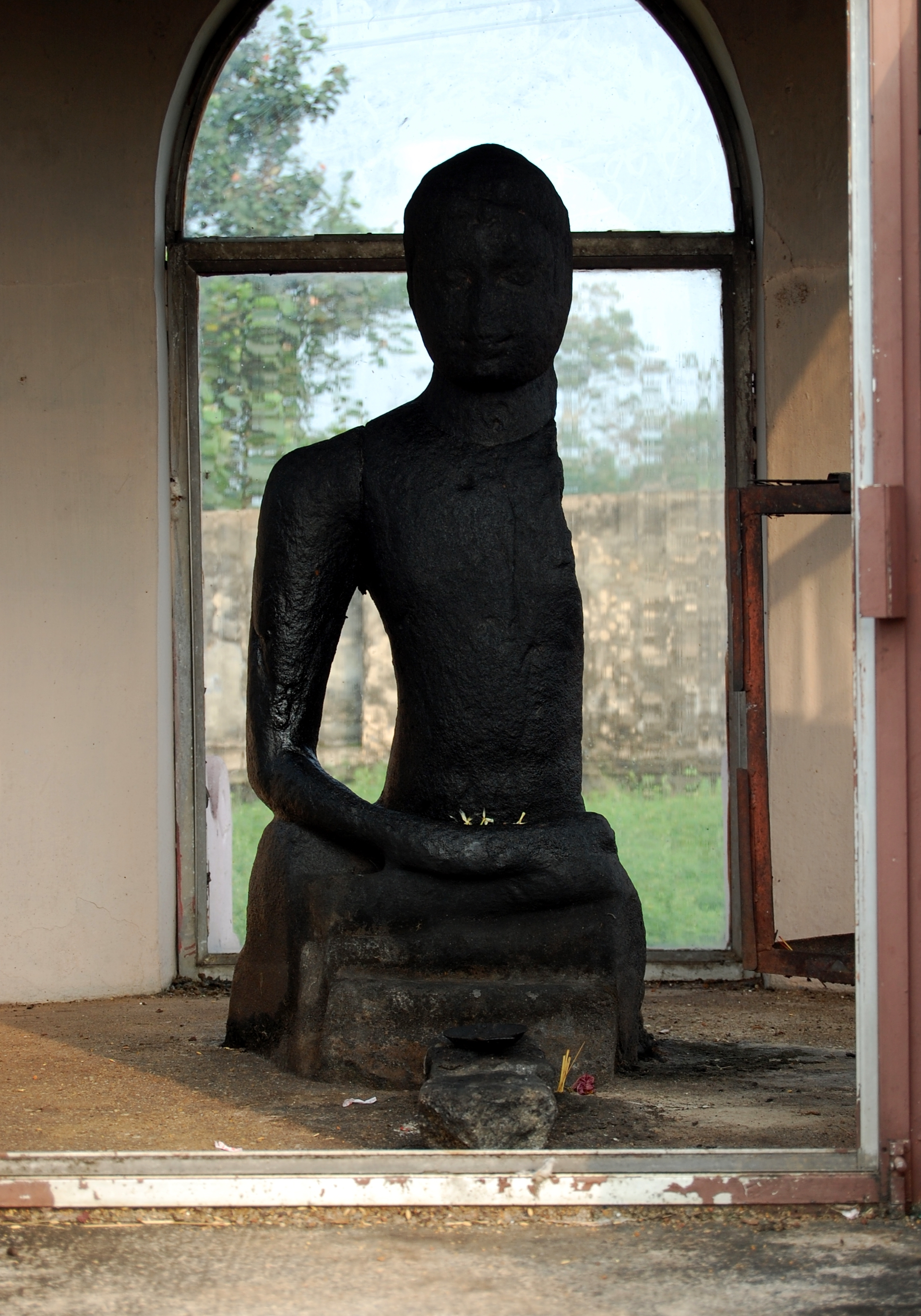
Statue of Karumadikkuttan from Alappuzha

Buddhist statues are believed to have been destroyed or Hinduized under later Hindu rulers. But rare Buddha statues have been found intact. They are mainly found at Mavelikkara, Maruthur, Kulangara, Karumadi, Bharanikkavu, Kunnathoor and Pallikkal in Kollam district. The statue in the Pallikkal Temple was headless. Today it is preserved in a museum in Thiruvananthapuram. The head is made of a similar stone and assembled. The statue of Mavelikkara was found in a field near the Kandiyur Shiva Temple. According to the historian S. N. Sadasivan, Until A.D. 450, it was the main deity in the Kandiyur Shiva Temple. All the statues are carved in stone. They are all in the form of yogasana, is 2–3 feet long from the feet to the turban. Most of the statues are said to be seated in a lotus position in meditation. Anthropology records that the statue at Maruthur Kulangara is the oldest of its kind. It was built in the 7th century. It was found in a pond near the temple. The black meditative statue found near Thottappilly in Ambalapuzha is called Karumadikuttan. The Buddha statue found near the guest house at Mavelikkara is placed on the public road near the Sri Krishnaswamy Temple. The Buddha statue received from Bharanikawa dates back to AD. 9 century. P. C. Alexander and S. N.Sathasivan are the two historians who have written extensively about Buddhism in Kerala. According to them, these Buddha statues were made in the Anuradhapura style.

== Cultural significance ==
The influence of Buddhism in Kerala culture is significant. Ezhuthu Palli and Pallikoodam schools were historically under the influence of Buddhism. Until the end of the 18th century, the word 'Namostu Jinatam' (Namotu Chinatam) was used in the beginning of education training in Kerala in praise of the Buddha. Meaning a prayer to Jinan or Buddha. At that time, the entire text of Kerala was called Nanam Manam. It is an abbreviation of the Pali verse Naanam, Monam, Ettanam, Thuvanam, Jeenam, Ennanam, Thanam and Ummanam. These are the eight noble ways: the right perspective, the right goal, the right speech, the right action, the right way of life, the right focus, the right concentration, and the right effort.

=== Ayurveda ===
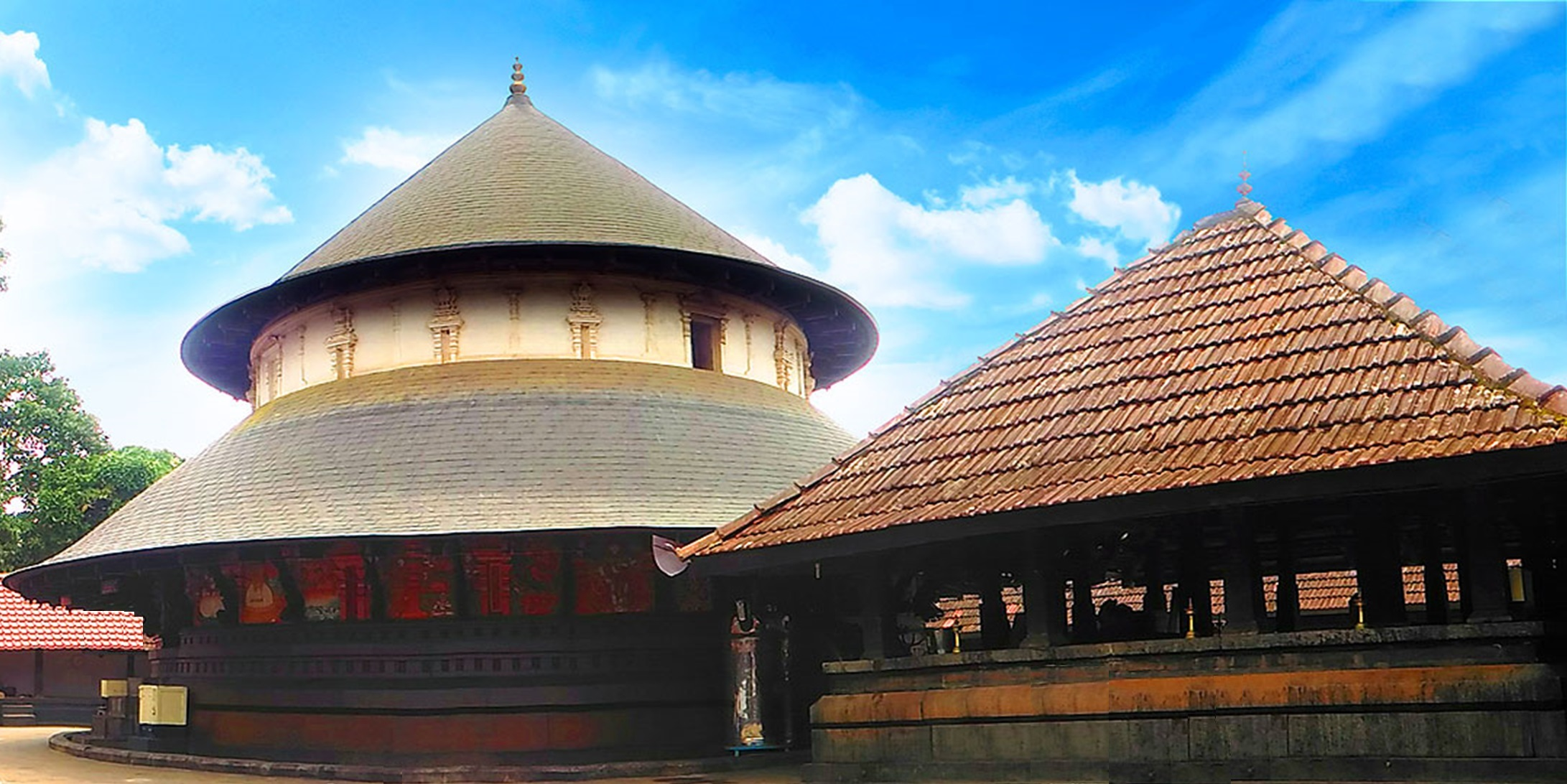
Chovallur Temple architecture

One of the cornerstones of the Buddhist movement was their push of medicinal practices within the region. They reached out to many parts of the society through hospitals, Buddhist monasteries and chaityas. Ashoka himself established medicinal plants in many places. The famous Buddhist monk and physician Bedanta Nagarjuna came to Thiruvizha in Cherthala after studying at the center for 18 years and there he is reported to have taught medicine and cared for the sick. The most valuable contribution of Bhadanta Nagarjuna is in the field of Ayurveda, through his work Rasa Vaiseshika Sutra.

In the research paper published in the journal Global Histories, entitled 'Plants, Power and Knowledge: An Exploration of the Imperial Networks and the Circuits of Botanical Knowledge and Medical Systems on the Western Coast of India Against the Backdrop of European Expansionism', Malavika Binny states that Kerala had medical traditions that existed even prior to it being known as Ayurvedic tradition. As per the author, Tradition of Healing Practices or 'Vaidyam', as it is called, was prominent among other medical traditions that existed in Kerala which involved a considerable contribution from Buddhism which was a major force from the sixth century to about the eleventh century. The Buddhist contribution of medicinal remedies for diseases and the knowledge of the indigenous plants preserved by the natives was exploited by the European endeavour as suggested by the inclusion of Itty Achudan in the compilation of Hortus Malabaricus which is basically an ethno-botanical treatise on the flora of Malabar.

=== Architecture ===
Cave temples of Kerala, that once upon a time were used by Jain and Buddhist monks to meditate, such as the Trikkur Mahadeva Temple, demonstrate the presence of rock-cut architecture. With the decline of Buddhism in the region, they got adopted as Hindu temples. While some Buddhist Stupas were also present in Kerala during the ancient period, the traditional architecture of Kerala, particularly in the context of Hindu temples, does not show significant influences of Buddhist design.

=== Rituals of temples ===
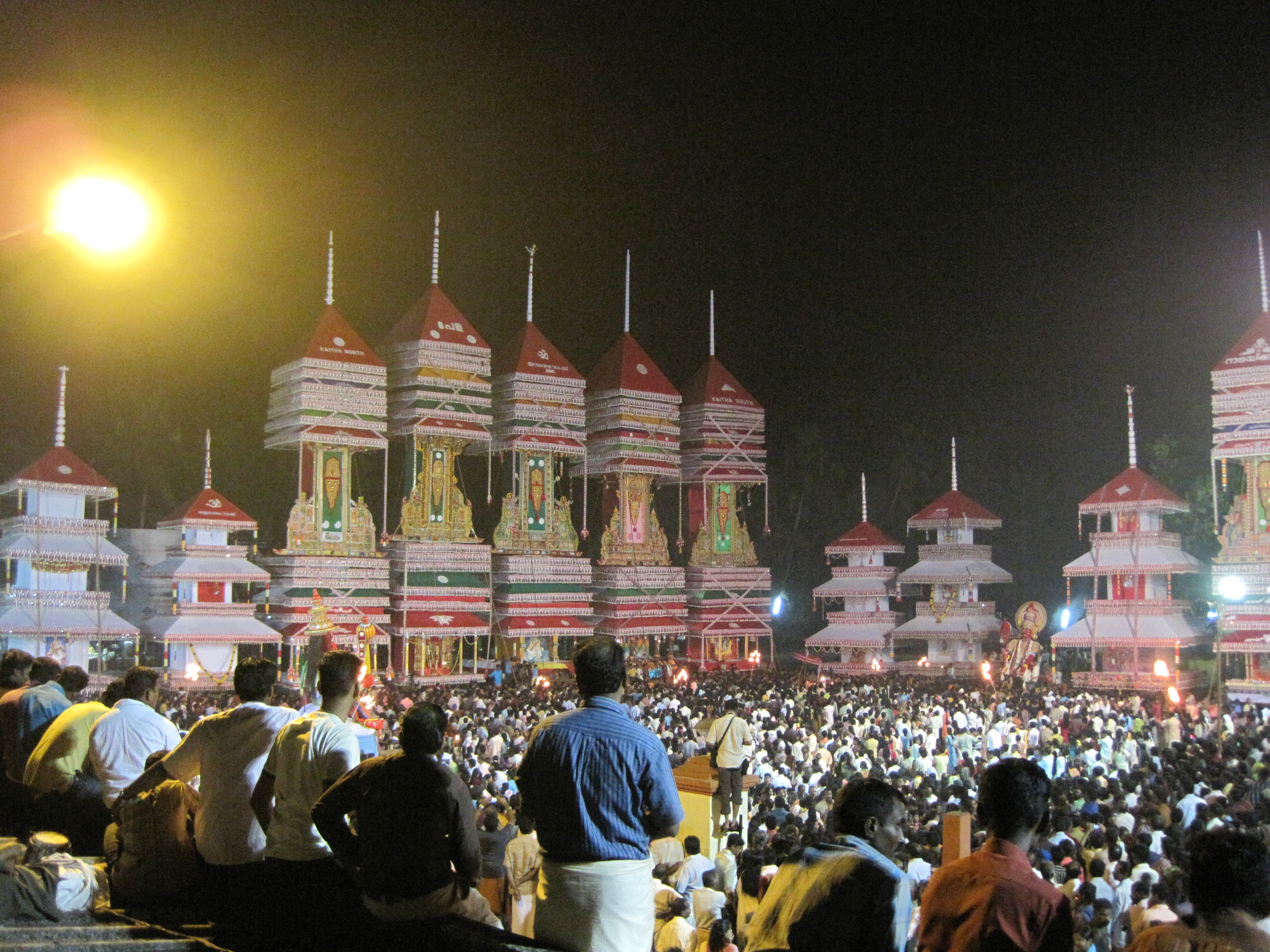
Kettukazhcha in Chettikulangara Temple

Temple rituals such as Vedikettu, Katina, Parayeduppu, Padayani, Pooram, Kettukazhcha and Rathotsavam are Buddhist offerings. Along with the Buddhist monasteries, they ran schools and health care centers.

=== Shramanic influences in Hindu traditions and practices ===
- Theyyam, a popular ritual form of worship of North Malabar in Kerala (predominantly in the Kolathunadu area) as well as in Southern Karnataka (such as Coorg or South Canara). The word is probably a variant of Dheivam or Theivam that means God in Malayalam and Tamil.
- Pallipana, a ritual performed by velans (sorcerers) every 12 years during the Arattu festival at Ambalappuzha Sri Krishna Temple

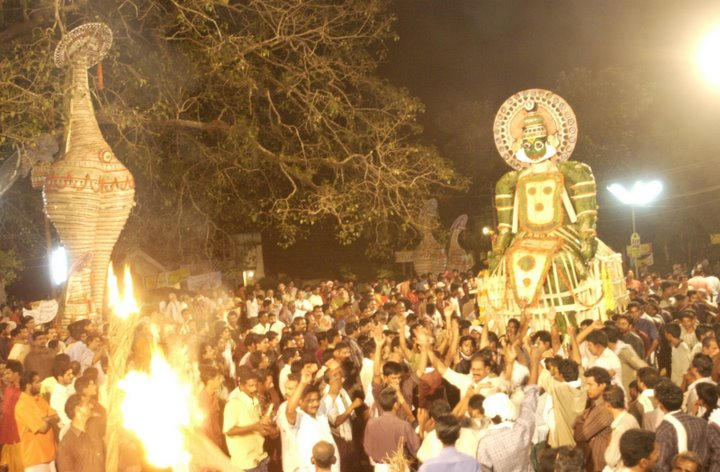
Neelamperoor Padayani

- Pooram Padayani, a festival at Neelamperoor Palli Bhagavathi Temple in praise of Goddess Vanadurga, which is considered similar to the Buddhist festival seen by Fahian at Patna, Bihar. The main feature is the display of exquisitely decorated effigies named Kettukazhcha. Padayani is a symbolic victory march of Goddess Kali after vanquishing Darika.
- Kettukazhcha at Chettikulangara Devi Temple, where the main deity is Goddess Bhadrakali.
- Kodungallur Bharani festival in honour of the deity Kodungallur Bhagavathy (Bhadrakali) who is considered the legendary Kannagi of Tamil mythology and who is also revered as Goddess Pattini by Sri Lankan Sinhalese Buddhists.
- Valiyakulangara Kettukazhcha at Valiyakulangara Devi Temple
- Thalappoli festival at Kodungallur Bhagavathy Temple

== Famous Buddhists from Kerala ==
=== Amarasimhan ===
Author of Amarakosa. He lived in Thakazhi near Mavelikkara. Amarakosham was written by him after living in Thakazhi for 20 years. He then went to Sri Lanka, where he received the title of Simhan and later to Vikramaditya's country. Amarasinghe was one of the 'Navaratnas' who lived during the reign of King Vikramaditya.

=== Chithala Chathanar ===
Chathanar or Chithala Chathanar, cītala cāttanār) was the Tamil poet who composed the epic Manimekalai. A total of 11 verses of the Sangam literature have been attributed to Satthanar, including verse 10 of the Tiruvalluva Maalai. The famous kings of the Sangam period were Buddhists. Chilapathikaram, a famous group work, is one that reveals the Buddhist influence of the time. Chithalai Chathanar was the Buddhist monk who wrote Manimekhala, the successor to Silapathikaram. The theme of Manimekhala is about converting from Jainism to Buddhism. He was a contemporary of Cheran Senguttuvan and was believed to have practiced Buddhism. He has sung in praise of the Pandyan king Chittira Maadatthu Thunjiya Nanmaran in the Sangam work of Purananuru.

=== Aryadevan ===
Aryadevan was a Buddhist scholar who lived in the 5th-6th centuries. He was a follower of Nagarjuna and wrote Chathusika. He lived at Sembapuram (present day Srangapuram) in Kodungallur. Huang Sang, a Chinese traveler, describes Aryan.

=== Pallivana perumal ===
Palli Vanapperumal or Pallibana Perumal was a famous king of the Cheravamsa dynasty based in Mahodayapuram (present day Kodungallur). Researchers have established that he lived in the 15th-16th centuries. He was the last propagandist of Buddhism in Kerala. His first temple was the Palli Bhagavathi Temple near Kodungallur. However, he left Kodungallur for Kuttanad and built many Buddhist temples and chaityas there. According to historical records, Palli Banapperumal was a favorite of the locals. His influence can be seen in Neelamperur and Kilirur Padayanis.

=== Balachandran Chullikkadu ===
Balachandran Chullikkadu (born 1957) is a Malayali poet, orator and actor, who embraced Buddhism in 2000, becoming an ardent critic of Hinduism.

== See also ==
- Lists of Buddhist sites and traditions in Kerala
