= List of Buddhist sites and traditions in Kerala =

This is a list of Buddhist sites, relics, and traditions in the Indian state of Kerala. Some historians states that Kerala had considerable Buddhist presence until the 16th century. Over the years, their population has drastically declined. According to the 1981 census, there were 223 Buddhists compared to 605 in 1971 census.

== List of statues discovered ==
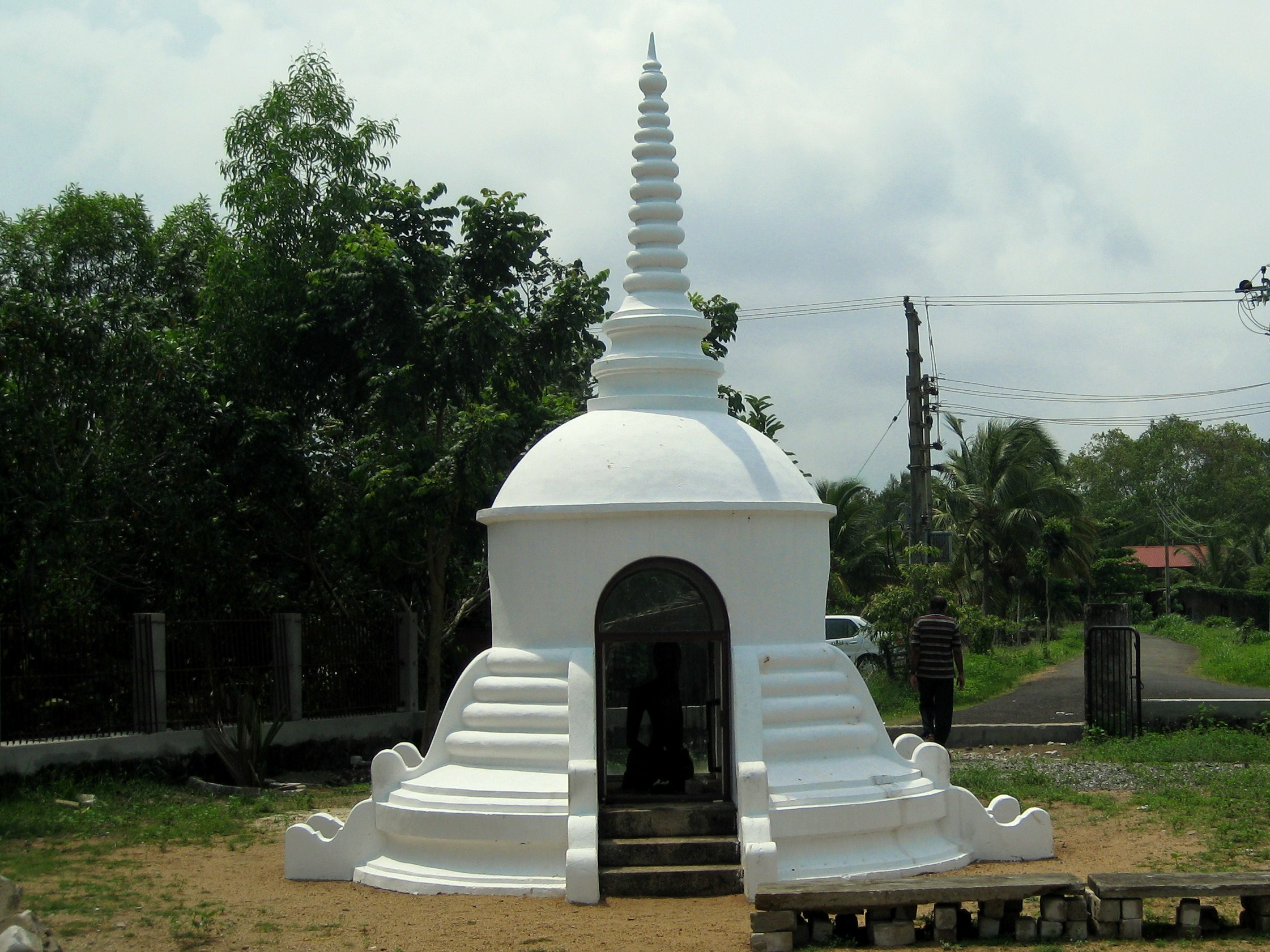
Karumadikuttan Buddha statue and stupa

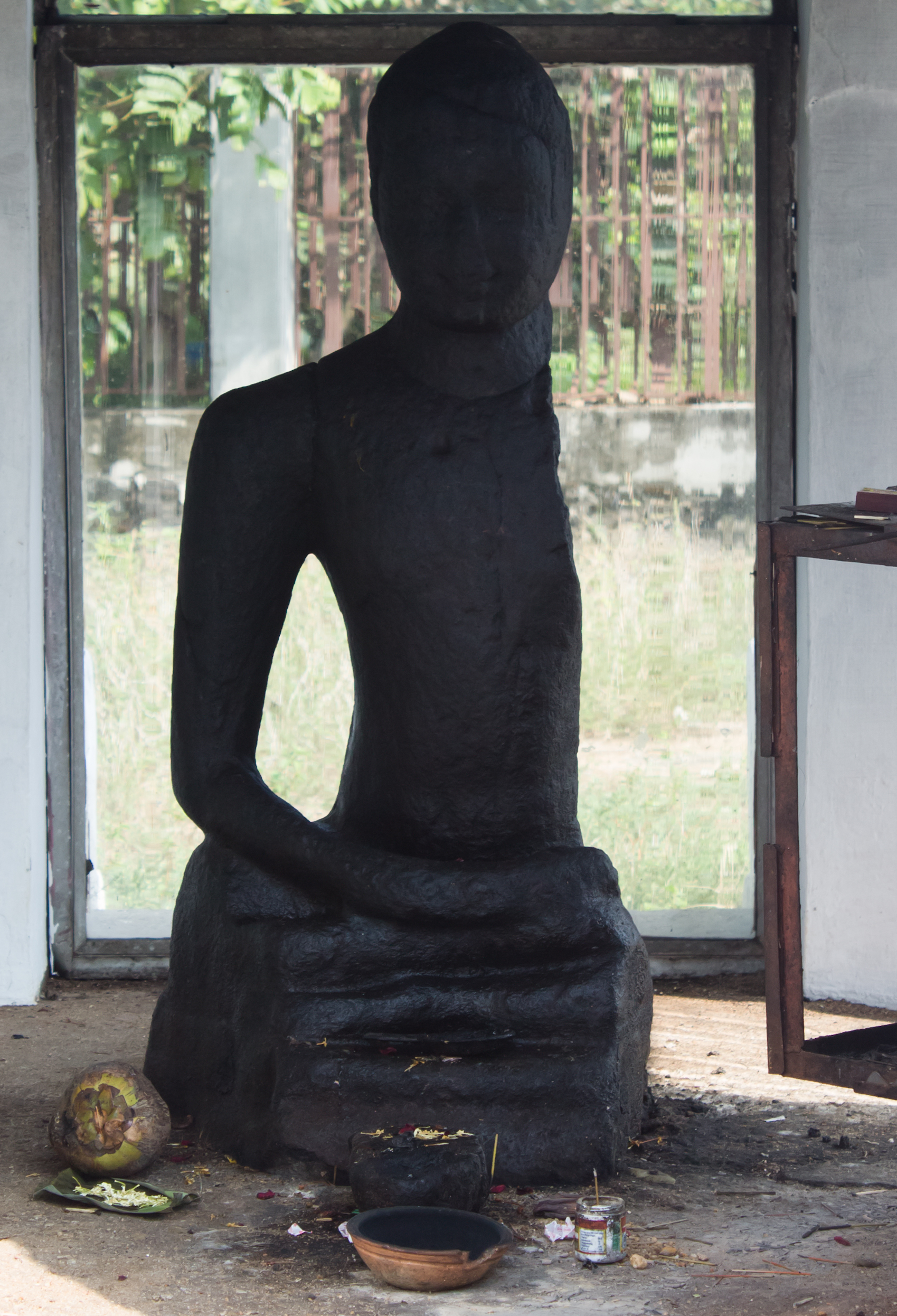
Broken Karumadikuttan Buddha statue

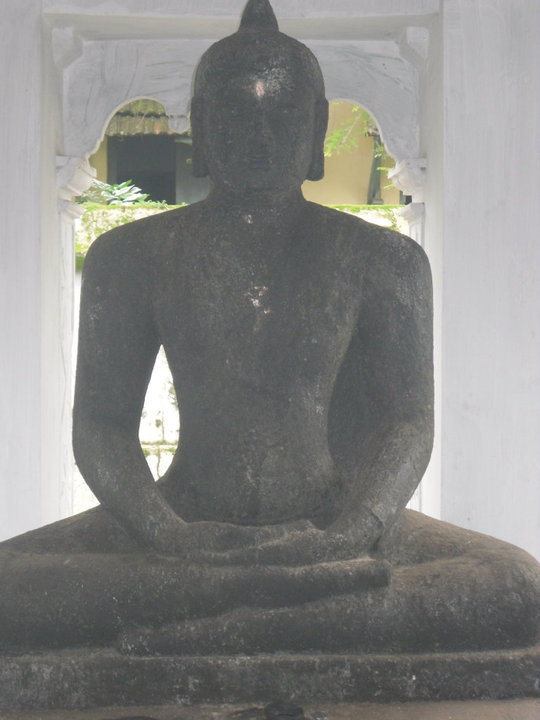
Buddha statue at Mavelikkara

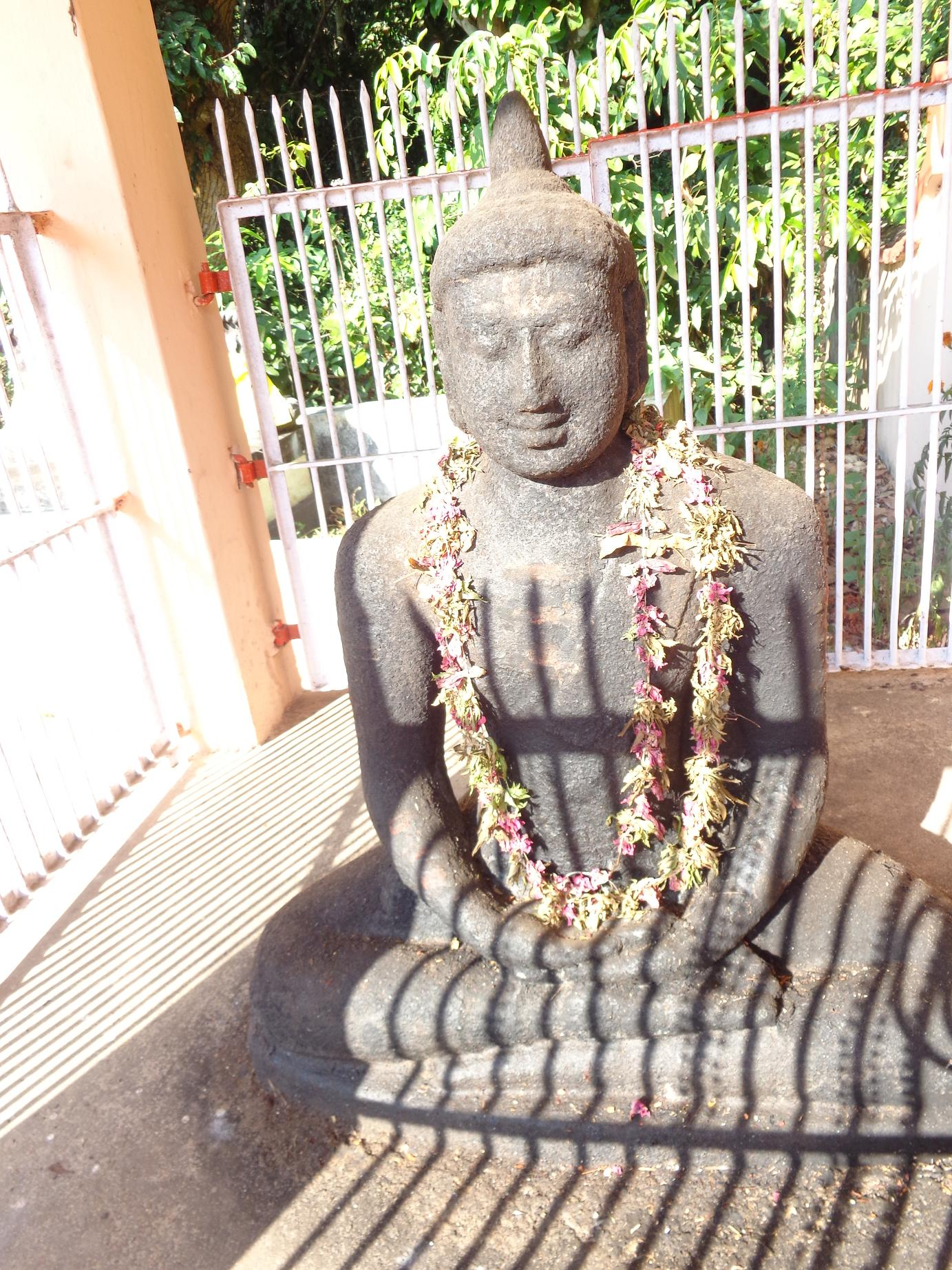
Buddha statue at Bharanikkavu

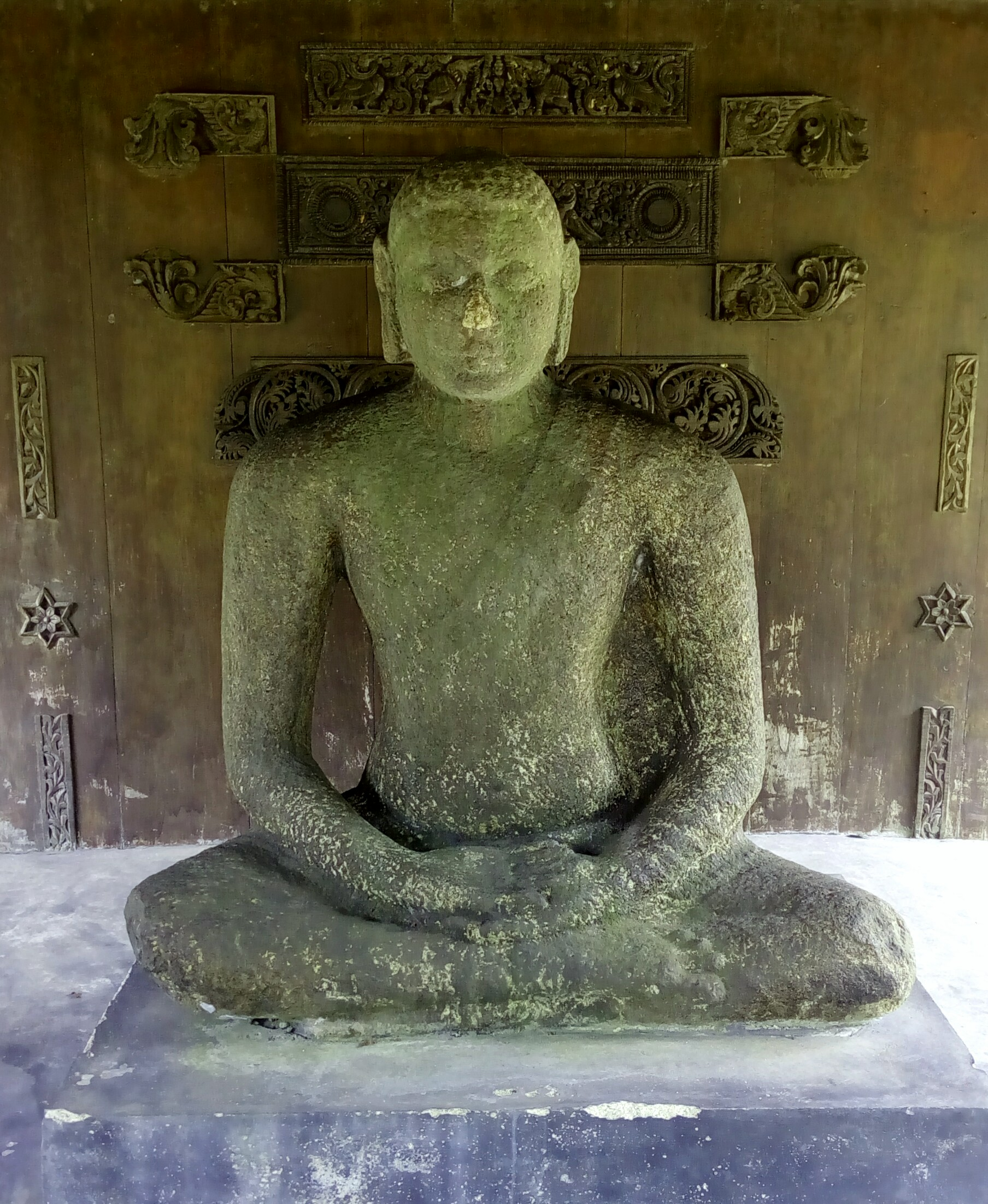
Buddha statue at Krishnapuram Palace, Kayamkulam

In 2015, G. Prem Kumar, director of Kerala State Department of Archaeology, five Buddhist statues has been discovered in Kerala. The Karumadikkuttan is a half-broken black Buddha statue at Karumady in Alappuzha district, dating to 10th century when Buddhism flourished in Kerala. The pagoda housing the statue is believed to have been built by Dalai Lama during his visit to the state. There are multiple legends as to how the statue was broken, in one, the Kaumadikkuttan survived a mass destruction of Buddhist statues by Mughals, another version says a charging elephant destroyed it.

- Buddha statue near Sree Krishna Swamy Temple, Buddha Junction, Mavelikkara. It was accidentally excavated during the early 20th century, from a paddy field near the Kandiyoor temple.
- Buddha statue at Bharanikkavu, found near the Bharanikkavu Devi temple located 8 km northwest of Mavelikkara. The statue is placed in a seated position and was elegantly carved.
- Buddha statue at Pallikkal, about 11 km from Adoor was found headless.
- Buddha statue at Karunagapally, found in a temple tank, this statue is probably the best found till date. Unaware local people used this even to clean their clothes (like an ordinary stone) until 1980, when the Kerala State department of Archaeology acquired it. This statue is currently preserved at Krishnapuram Palace Museum, Kayamkulam.

== List of temples discovered ==
- Sri Mulavasam, a Buddhist temple and place of pilgrimage in Kerala (either around the Thrikkunnapuzha-Ambalapuzha region or in North Malabar).

== List of Inscriptions, Copper Plates and Artifacts with Buddhist heritage ==
The Paliyam copper plates (or Sreemoolavasam Cheppedukal from Sri Mulavasam) of the Ay King, Vikramaditya Varagunan (885–925 AD) in the fifteenth year of his rule, indicates that Buddhists enjoyed royal patronage and privileges until the 10th century CE, at least in South Kerala.

Quote: "The plates were discovered by T. A. Gopinatha Rao. According to Elamkulam Kunjan Pillai, the plates date back to AD 929 (Makaram 7, Kollavarsham 104). But more credibility is to the finding of M. G. S. Narayanan that these date back to AD 898. According to the inscription, a huge number of land holdings were donated to the Sri Mulavasam. The upkeep of the lands are believed to have been vested with Prince Indukotha, an heir to the throne, during the reign of Veerakotha Kulasekhara. A mangalacharana praising Buddha, dharma, and sangha is inscribed in the plates. They also mention about Paranthaka Chola's attack on Kerala."

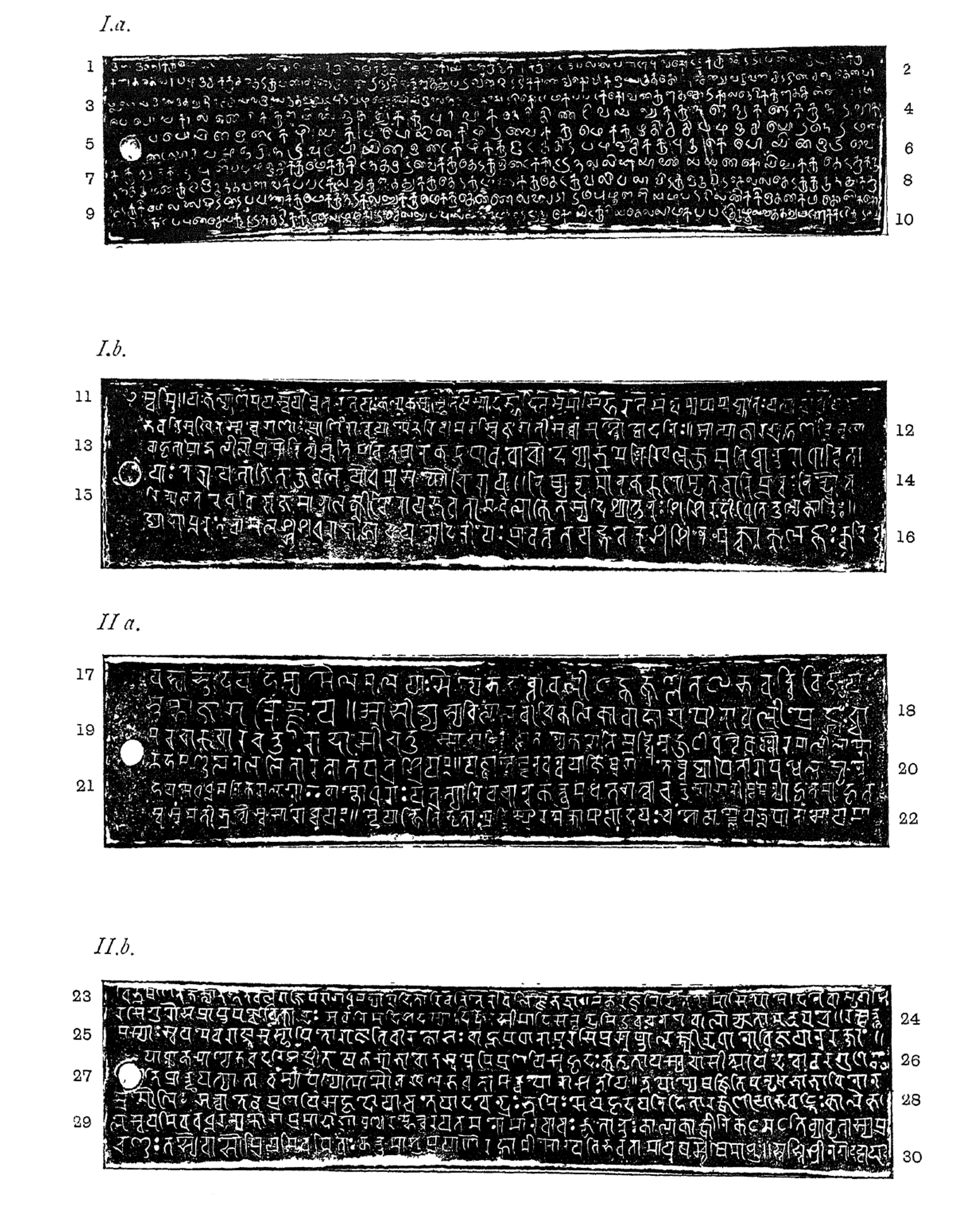
Paliyam copper plate (Vikramaditya Varaguna)

== List of places (villages and towns) with ancient Buddhist presence ==
- Alappuzha-Ambalappuzha region that was under Buddhist influence during the rule of the Ay King Varaguna.

== Modern Buddhist sites ==
- Kakkayur Buddha temple, at Kakkayur village near Chittur town, Palakkad district. It was built below a Bodhi (Pipal) tree planted at around 1949–1950 CE, as a seed that a local farmer collected from the Bodhi tree of Bodh Gaya.
- Vezhanganam Buddha temple and study center near Pala, Kottayam by Tibetan Buddhist monks of Bylakuppe.
- Buddha Vihar near Kozhikode Beach started by Mithavaadi Krishnan this center had strong connection with Buddhism in Sri Lanka

== See also ==
- Buddhist pilgrimage sites in India
- Buddhism amongst Tamils
- Buddhism in Sri Lanka
- Naga Nadu and Naga people of Sri Lanka
- Palli Bana Perumal
- Mahakali Caves, ancient Buddhist viharas near Mumbai with a Bhadrakali temple nearby.
- Perambalur Buddhas, a set of historic Buddhist images found in Thiyaganur, Perambalur district where the only surviving Buddhist temple of Tamil Nadu is located.
