= Pallickal =

Pallickal may refer to:

- Pallickal, Thiruvananthapuram, a village in Thiruvananthapuram district, Kerala, India
- Pallickal, Kollam, a village in Kollam district, Kerala, India
- Pallikkal, Pathanamthitta, a village in Pathanamthitta district, Kerala, India
- Pallickal, Alappuzha, a village in Alappuzha district, Kerala, India
- Pallikkal Bazar, a village in Malappuram district, Kerala, India
- Pallikkal River, a river in Kerala, India
