= Karumadikkuttan =

Buddha statue in India

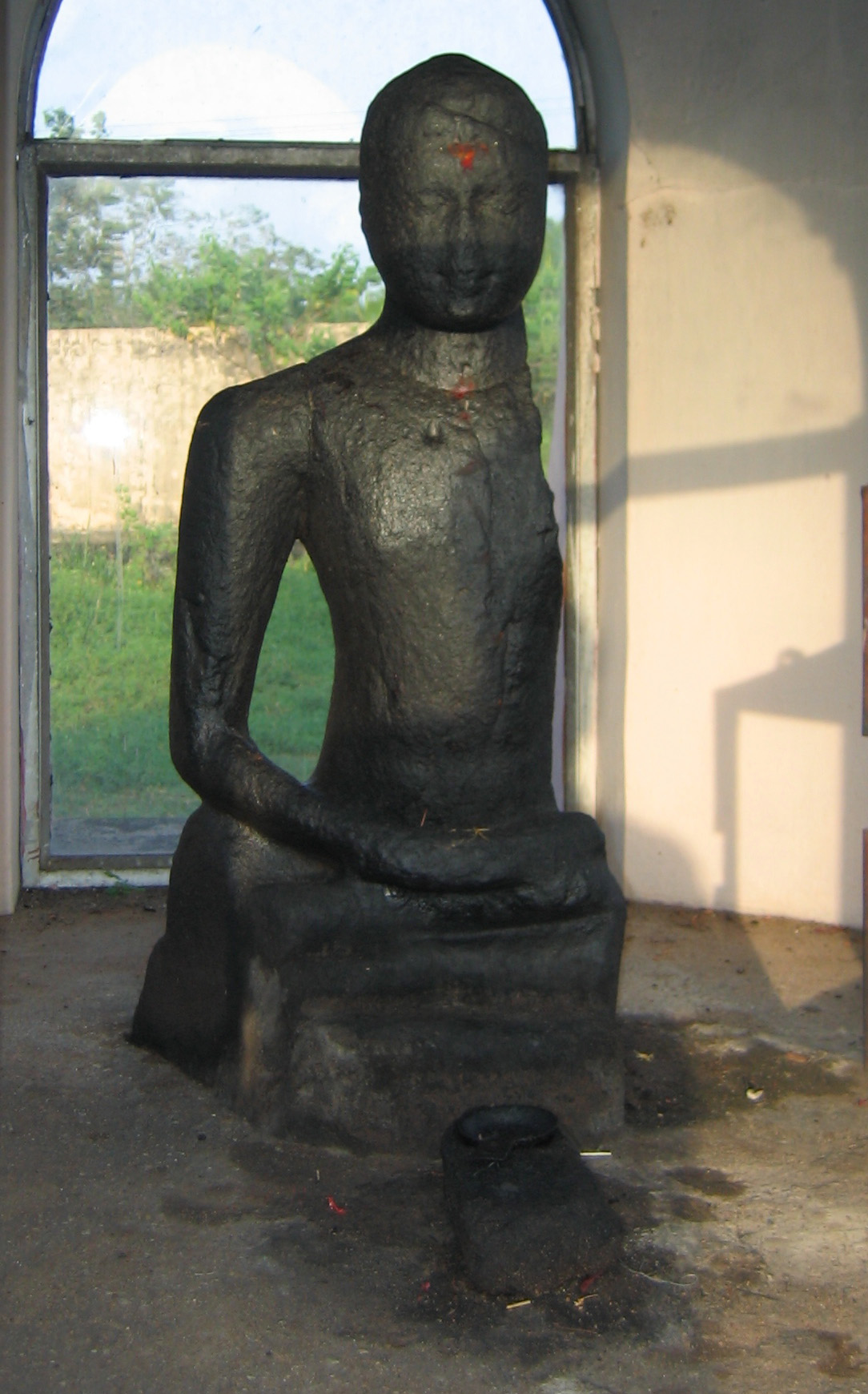
Statue of Karumadikkuttan

Karumadikkuttan (Malayalam: കരുമാടിക്കുട്ടൻ) is a three-foot-tall black granite Buddha statue located in the village of Karumadi, Alappuzha, Kerala, India. It is believed to date from the 9th to 14th century.

Sir Robert Bristow, a colonial British engineer, discovered the statue in the 1930s.

The Dalai Lama visited the site in 1965.

== See also ==
- Buddhism in Kerala
