= Maruthur =

Coordinates: 10°49′N 76°13′E

Maruthur is a village in the Palayamkottai Block, Palayam kottai taluk Tirunelveli district of Tamil Nadu, in India.
