= Neelamperoor Padayani =

Festival in Kerala

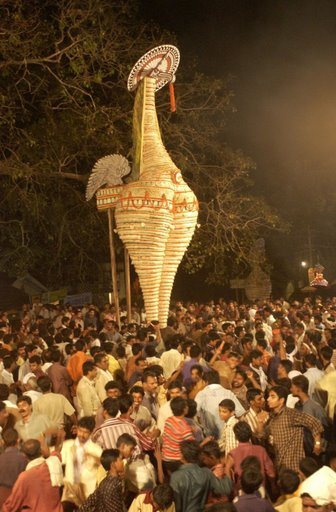
Neelamperoor Padayani

Neelamperoor Padayani is Padayani conducted in Neelamperoor Palli Bhagavathi Temple in Neelamperoor, Alappuzha district, Kerala, India. It is conducted on the pooram day after Thiruvonam in the month chingam for 16 days.

== Etymology ==
The word Padayani means line of infantry. The name Padayani arrived due to the line formation of people like troops.

== Mythology ==
The mythology of Neelamperoor padayani lies with Cheraman Perumal myths. It is believed that it was started after the arrival of king Cheraman Perumal in Neelamperoor.

== History ==
It is believed that this festival had the history of centuries.

== Rituals ==
Neelamperoor Padayani has some difference from other Padayani performances held in the temples in Kerala. The key feature of this festival is the procession of effigies. They include the figures of animals like swans, elephants, etc. and deities such as Bhima, Ravana, Yakshi, etc. as an offering to the goddess. These decorated effigies shows the craftsmanship of artists in Kerala.

Neelamperoor Padayani - നിലമ്പേരൂർ പടയണി - Wiki Loves Onam 2024

The padayani begins in thiruvonam day and end with pooram day which is celebrated as the birthday of Bhagavathy (goddess). As per the rituals, the padayani is started with a symbolic sanction of Cheraman Perumal in the western side of Bhagavathy temple. Devotees march towards the monument of Perumal with lit torches of coconut leaves. This ritual longs for four days.

This days are followed by Kudapadayani which consists of floral decorations in umbrella made from the stems of coconut leaves. The next four days effigies made up of jackfruit leaves are offered to the deity. The last two days are of effigies of swan which is made up of plantain stems and slender leaves of coconut trees with ixora floral decorations. The highlight of the last day is 45 feet long swan effigy.

Thothakali, a rhythmic dance performed in front of the fire accompanied by drumbeats and traditional music is another part of Neelamperoor Padayani.

== Major ceremonies ==
- Chutteedal
- Kudampooja kali
- Anujnavangal
- Thothakali
- Thengamurikkal
- Kudanirthu
- Plavilanirthu
- Makam Padayani
- Pooram Padayani

== Gallery ==
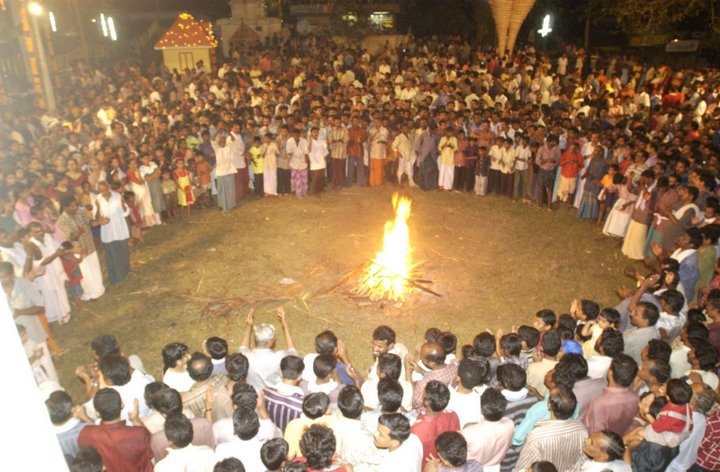
Kudampooja kali

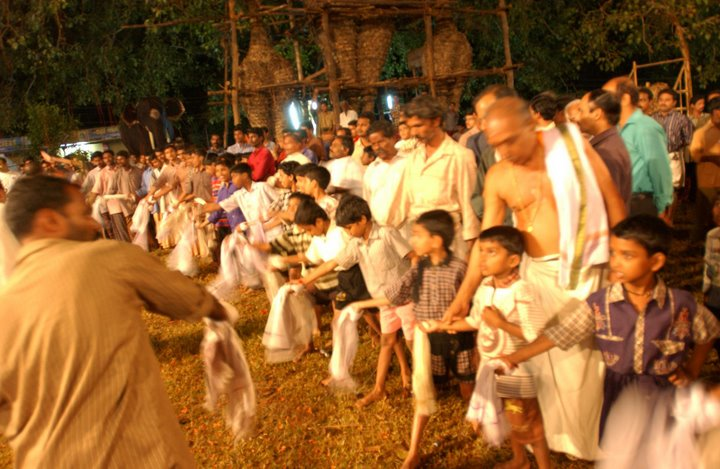
Thothakali

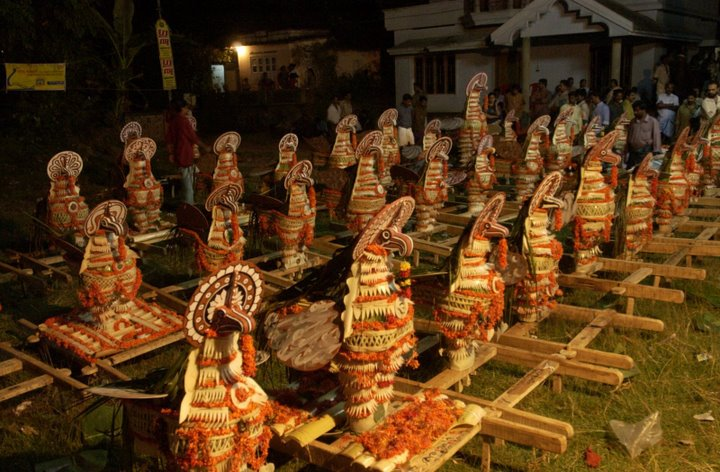
Thengamurikkal

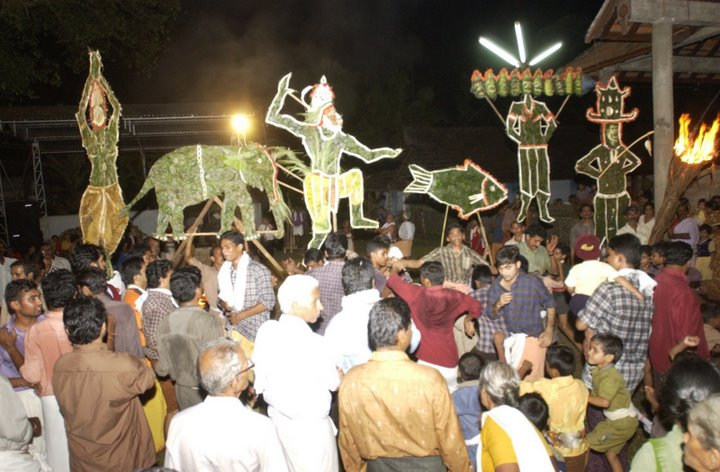
Plavilanirthu

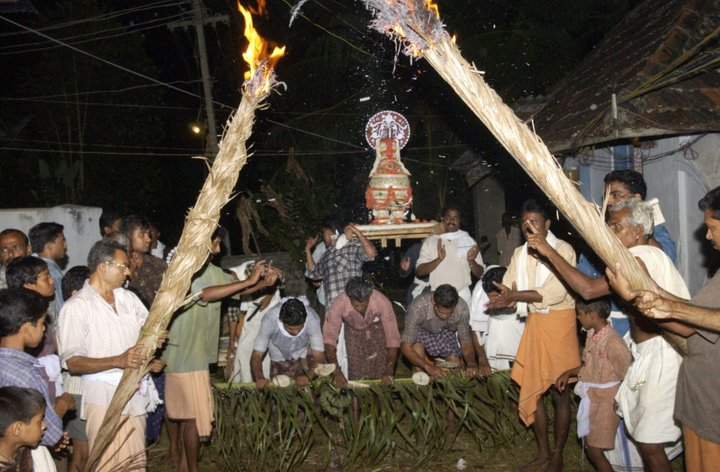
Velakali

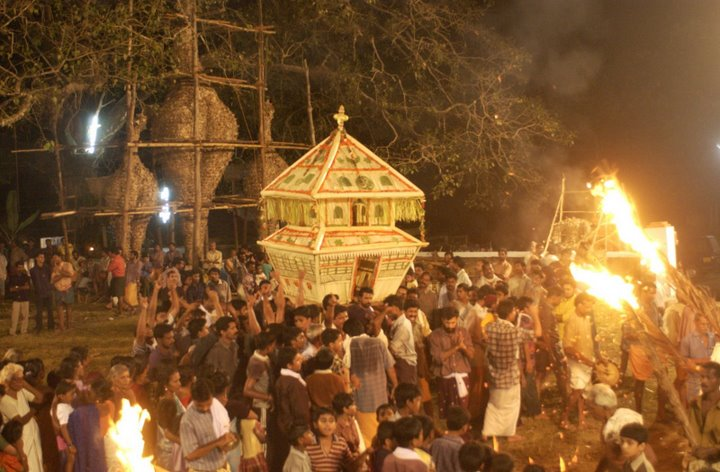
Ambalakkotta

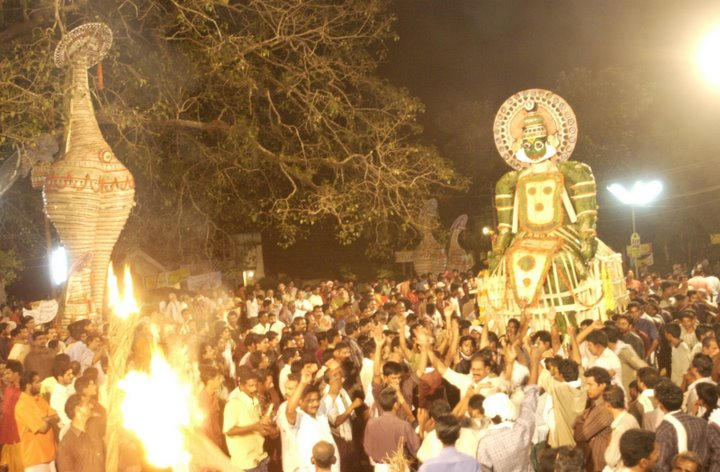
Pooram Padayani
