= Bharanikkavu =

Bharanikkavu Bharanickavu
- Census Town
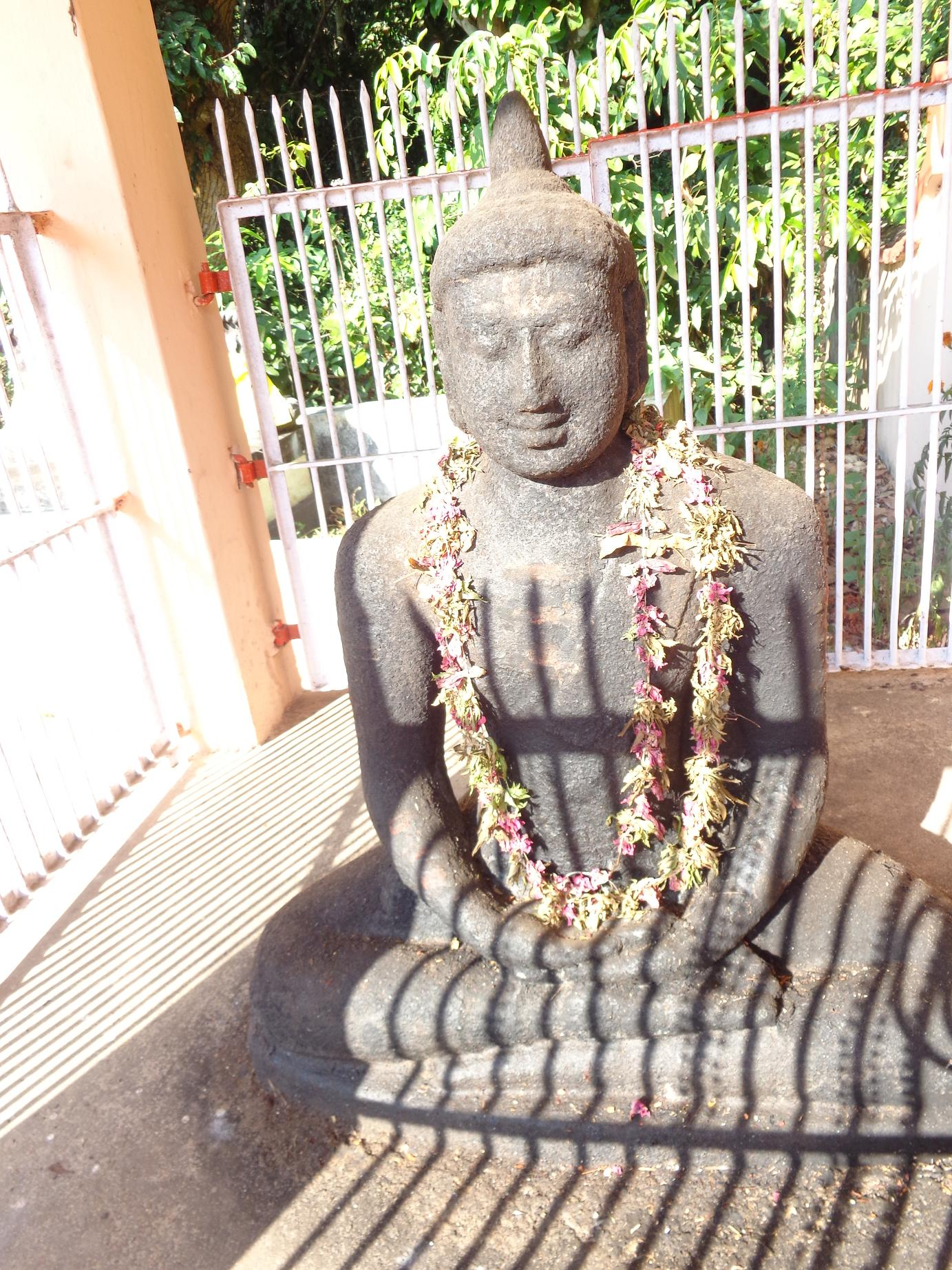
- Sree Buddha at Bharanikkavu Devi Temple
- Interactive map of Bharanikkavu
- Coordinates: 9.1846700°N 76.5445700°E
- Country: India
- State: Kerala
- District: Alappuzha

Population (2011)
  - Total: 15,922

Languages
  - Official: Malayalam, English
- Time zone: UTC+5:30 (IST)
- PIN: 690503
- Telephone code: 0479-233xxxx
- Vehicle registration: KL-31
- Nearest city: Kayamkulam
- Lok Sabha constituency: Alappuzha
- Climate: moderate (Köppen)

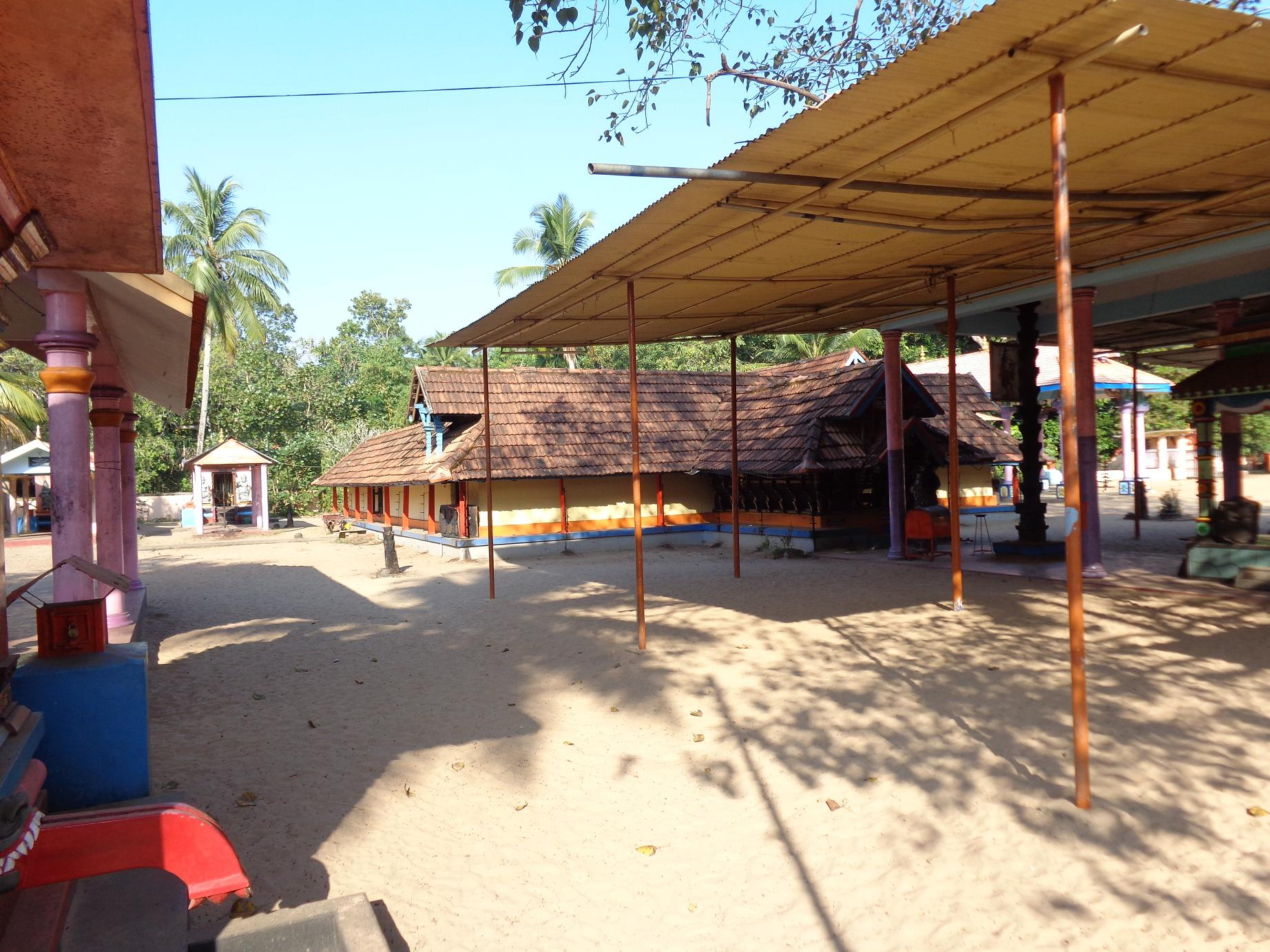
Bharanikkavu temple

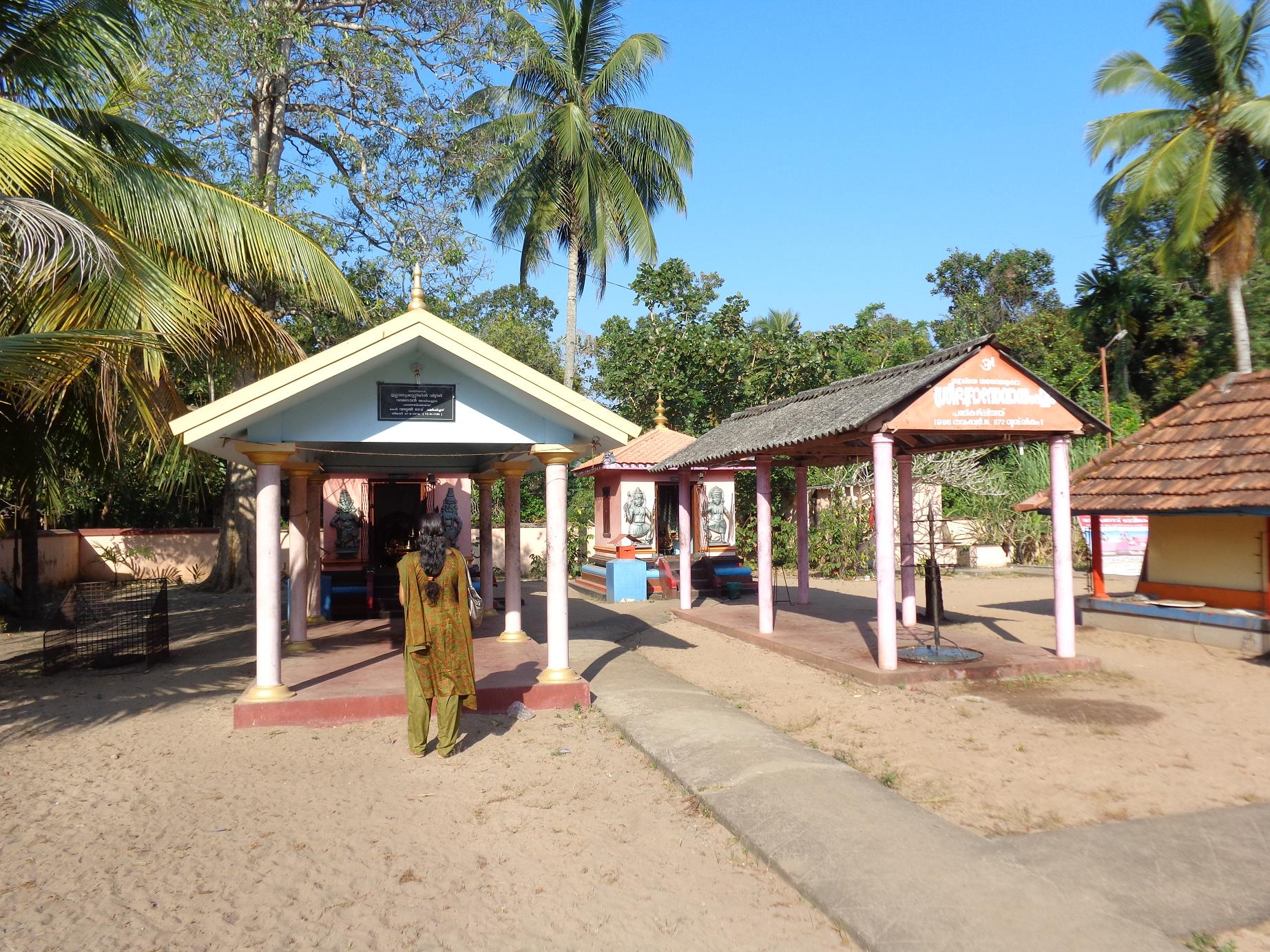
Bharanikkavu Ayya

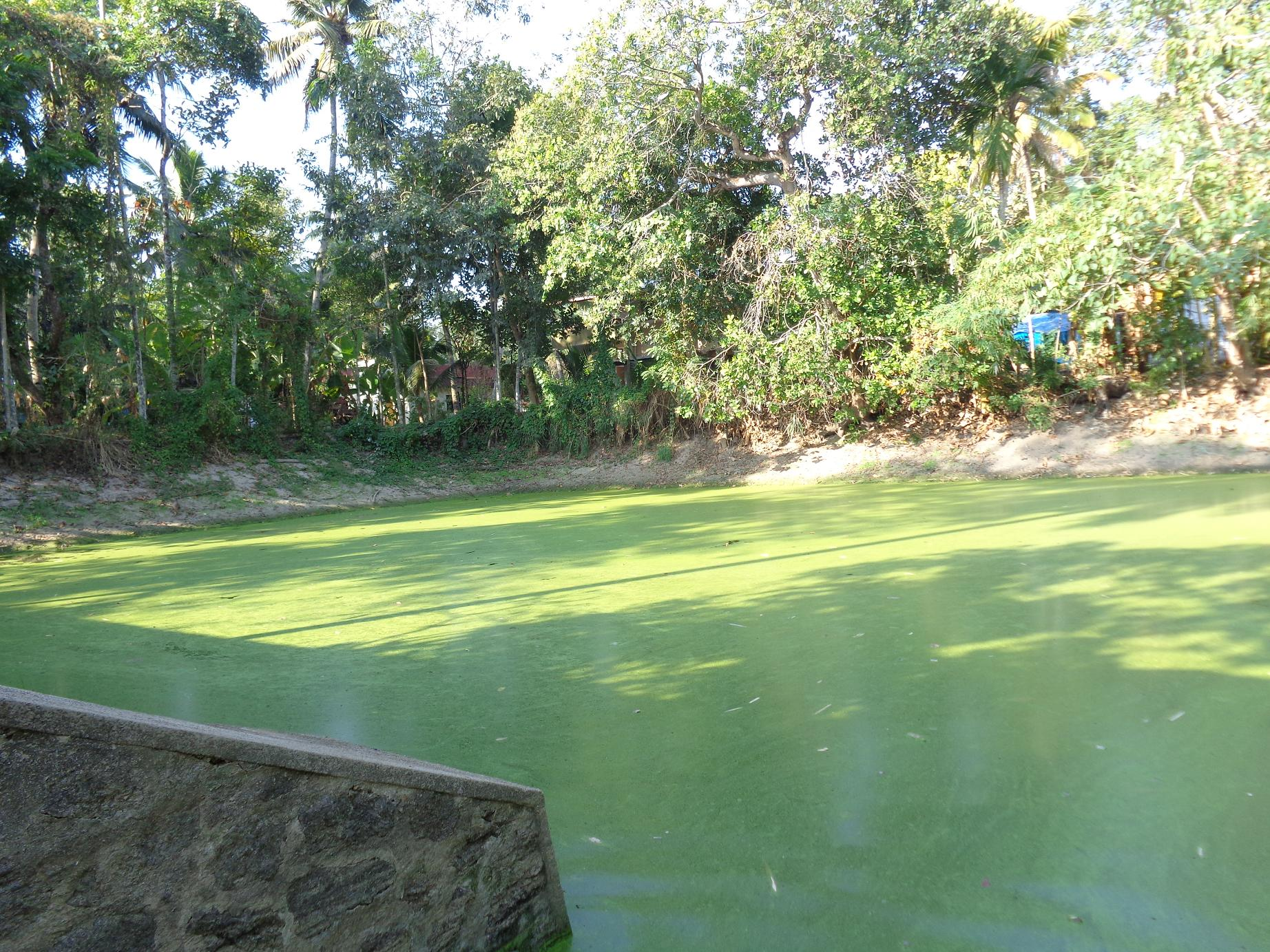
Temple pond at Bharanikkavu

Bharanikkavu is a Panchayat in the Kayamkulam legislative assembly in Alappuzha district in the Indian state of Kerala.

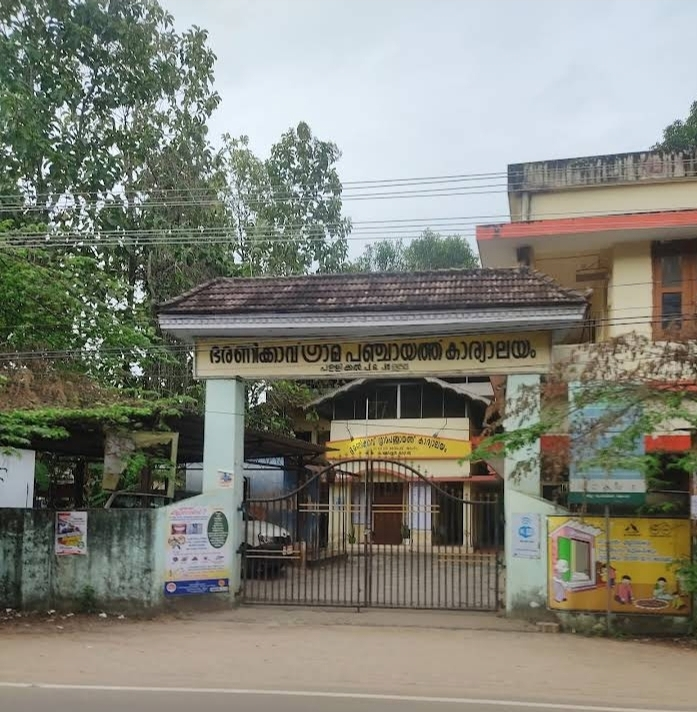
Bharanikavu Grama Panchayath

The village by the same name is a part of it.

The name is derived from the historic Bharanikkavu Devi temple situated here.

== Demographics ==
The 2011 Census of India found that Bharanikkavu had a population of 15922, with 7265 males and 8657 females.

=== Constituent Regions ===
- Bharanikkavu
- Pallickal
- Vetticode
- Kattanam
- Mankuzhy
- Choonadu
- Kattachira

=== Fast Growing Constituent Region ===
Kattanam

=== Educational Institutions & Libraries ===
Library: Grameena Grandhasala, Bharanickavu

Subhash Grandha Parayana Sala, Koickal Jn. Pallickal

Colleges:

- St. Thomas Nursing college, Vetticode
- Maha Guru College of Engineering, Kattachira, Pallickal

Schools:

- Sree Nagaraja Vilasam U. P. School (NRVUPS), Vetticode
- Sree Nagaraja School (CBSE), Vetticode
- Mar Thoma UP School, Kattanam
- St thomas Mar Thoma High School
- St.Thomas Senior Secondary School, Kattanam
- F. G. M. M. L. P. School, Bharanickavu (South)
- Kattachira L. P. School, Kattachira
- Captain N. P. Pillai Memorial Higher Secondary School, Kattachira
- Mahakavi Kumaranasan Central School, Pallickal, Naduvilemuri
- Government UP School, Moonamkutty
- Pope Pius XI Higher Secondary School, Kattanam
- C.M.S. High School, Pallickal
- Government L.P. School, Pallickal Naduvilemuri
- Government U.P. School, Bharanikkavu
- Veda Vyasa Vidya Peedom, Kattanam
- C.M.S. L.P. School Monkuzhy
- Gayathri Central School, Mankuzhy, Moonamkutti

Education Related:

- Kerala University Information Center, Moonamkutty, Pallickal

Training Centres:

- Karuna InfoStudies, Pallimukku, Kattanam

=== Religious Harmony & Festivals ===
The Temples of Bharanikkavu, the Churches of Kattanam, the Mosque in Choonad and the Budha statues represent the religious harmony of the panchayat.

=== Temples ===
- Bharanikkavu Devi Temple, Bharanikkavu
- Shri Nagaraja Temple, Vetticode
- Mahavishnu Temple, Kattachira
- Muttakkulam Devi Temple, Kattachira
- karimuttam temple, Peringala
- Karimuttathu Devi Temple, Mankuzhy
- Arekara Devi Temple, Kattachira
- Cheruvilathu Sri Mannadi Bhagavathi Temple
- Poovathoor Sastha Temple, Ilippakulam
- Panickasheril Shiva Temple, Kattachira
- Pallipuram Devi Temple, Kattanam, Vettikode
- Valliya Veedu Devi Temple, Kattanam
- MannadiKuttiyil Devi Temple, Kattanam
- Orukuzhiyil Saktheesha Temple, Kattanam
- Nadayil Kuttiyil (AYICKATTU) Sree Bhadra Devi Temple, Pallickal
- Mannachirethu Puthenkavil Sree Bhadra Bhagavathi Temple, Kattanam, Nambukulangara
- Kattachira Tharal thekkathil Shri Nagaraja Temple
- ValiyavedU Devi Temple Kattanam
- Konathu Devi Temple, Manjadithara
- Mandaykkattu Devi Temple (Kochambalam), Pallickal
- Padikal Panthaplavil Devi Temple, Bharanickavu South
- Mahalekshmi Devi Temple, Manjadithara
- Chirayil devi temple, Kurathikadu
- Mangaram Devi temple Mangaram

=== Churches ===
- St. Stephen's Orthodox Church, Kattanam
- Malankara Catholic Church, Kattanam
- St. Thomas Marthoma Church, Kattanam
- St.Thomas Marthoma Church, Pallickal
- St. James CSI Church, Kattanam
- CSI Church, Vetticodu
- Catholic Church, Achamkutty
- CSI Christ Church Monkuzhy
- The Pentecost Mission, Bharanickavu

=== Festivals ===
- The Ashwathi Mahotsavom & Koottamkottu @ Muttakkulam Devi Temple held in Kumbham every Year
- The Meenabharani Mahotsavom of Bharanikkavu Devi Temple, the associated Noottonnu Kalam and Ezhunnallathu.
- The Aayillya Pooja and Ezhunnallathu of Shri Nagaraja Temple, Vetticode.
- The Perunnal at the St. Stephen's Orthodox Church, Kattanam.
- Pathamudaya Mahothsavam of Pallipuram Devi Temple.
- Uthrdam Thirunnal Mahotsavom at Nadayil Kuttiyil Sree Bhadra Devi Temple in Meenam.

bharanikkavu devi temple other festivals. 1. Meena Bharani Pongaala 2. Sivarathri Maholtsavam 3. Navarathri Mandapa Utsavam 4. Vruchika Chirappu 5. Ashtamirohini Uriyati

1. Rohini Mahotsavom @ Mahalekshmi Temple Manjadithara

== Monuments and Historic Significance ==
The statue of Buddha housed and worshiped at the Bharanikkavu Temple where is a protected monument under the Department of Archaeology.
