= Kodungallur Bharani festival =

Hindu Festival

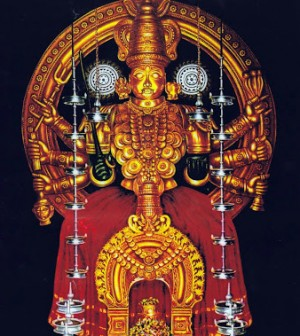
The deity at the Kodungallur Bhagavathy temple for whom the bharani festival is offered.

Kodungallur Bharani festival is a yearly festival dedicated to the goddess Bhadrakali of Kodungallur Kurumba Bhagavathy temple held between the Bharani days of months Kumbham and Meenam of the Malayalam calendar. This period usually falls between the months of March and April in Roman calendar. This festival traditionally involves sacrifice of roosters (Kozhikkallu moodal), dance of oracles (Kaavu theendal), lighting the traditional lamp (Revathi vilakku), singing of libelous ballads (Bharanippattu) and smearing of the image of the goddess with sandalwood paste (Chandanapoti Charthal).

== Rituals ==
=== Kozhikkallu moodal ===
This involves the ritual of sacrificing a rooster over a red silk cloth placed around the stones surrounding the idol. This ceremony symbolizes the fight between the goddess and the opponent Daarika. However, this ritual has not been performed since 1977, and is now reduced to covering the stones with a red silk cloth.

=== Kaavu theendal ===
Kaavu theendal starts when the king of Kodungallur unfurls the red ceremonial umbrella. Afterwards, the oracles, dressed in red with sickles or bamboo sticks in their hands run around the temple in trance. They also sing libelous ballads abusing the goddess. They also throw coconuts and turmeric powder to the roof and the inner corridors of the temple, thereby 'polluting' it. After this ceremony, the temple closes for a week for a 'purification' ceremony.

== Gallery ==
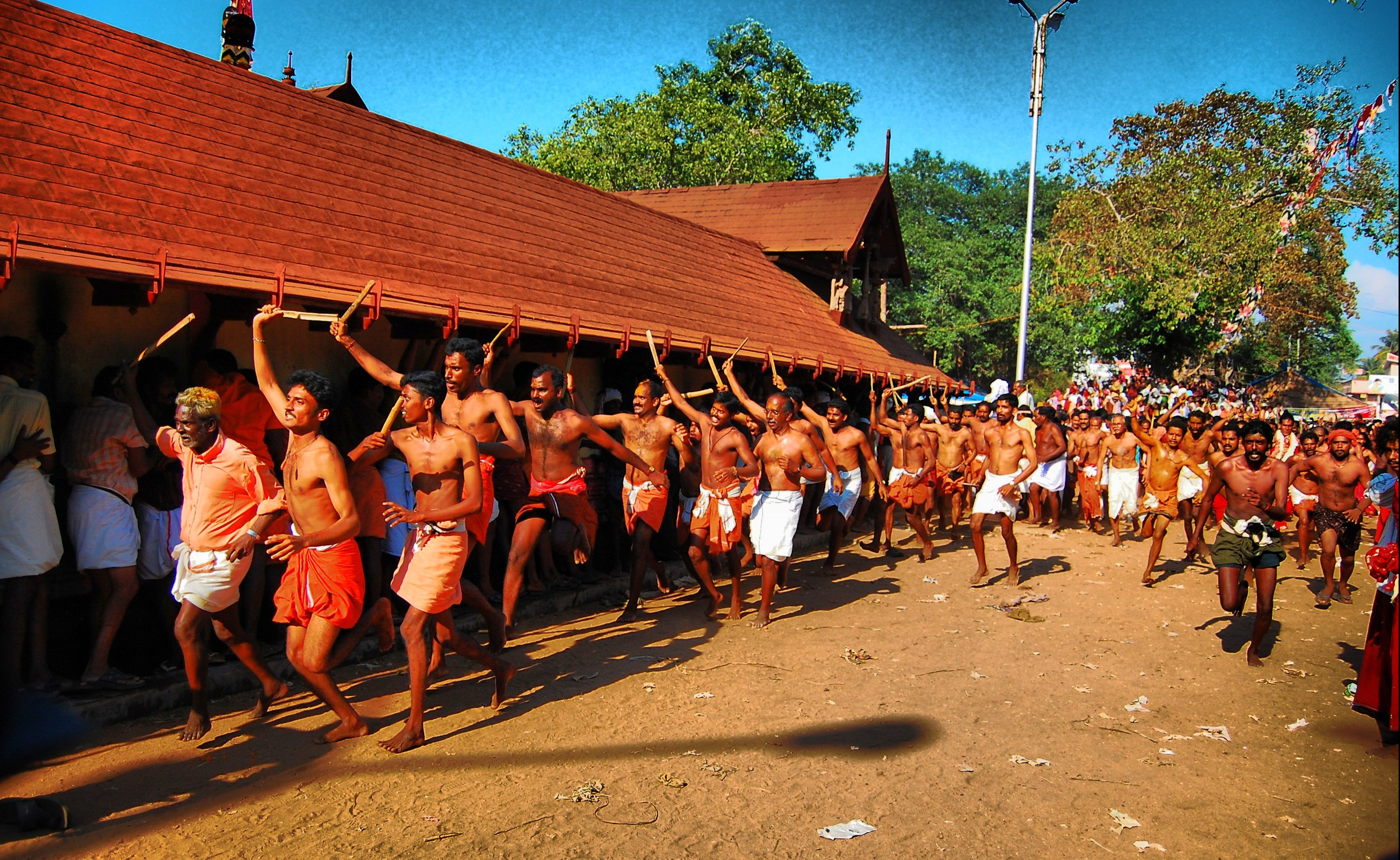
Oracles during the Kavutheendal ceremony.

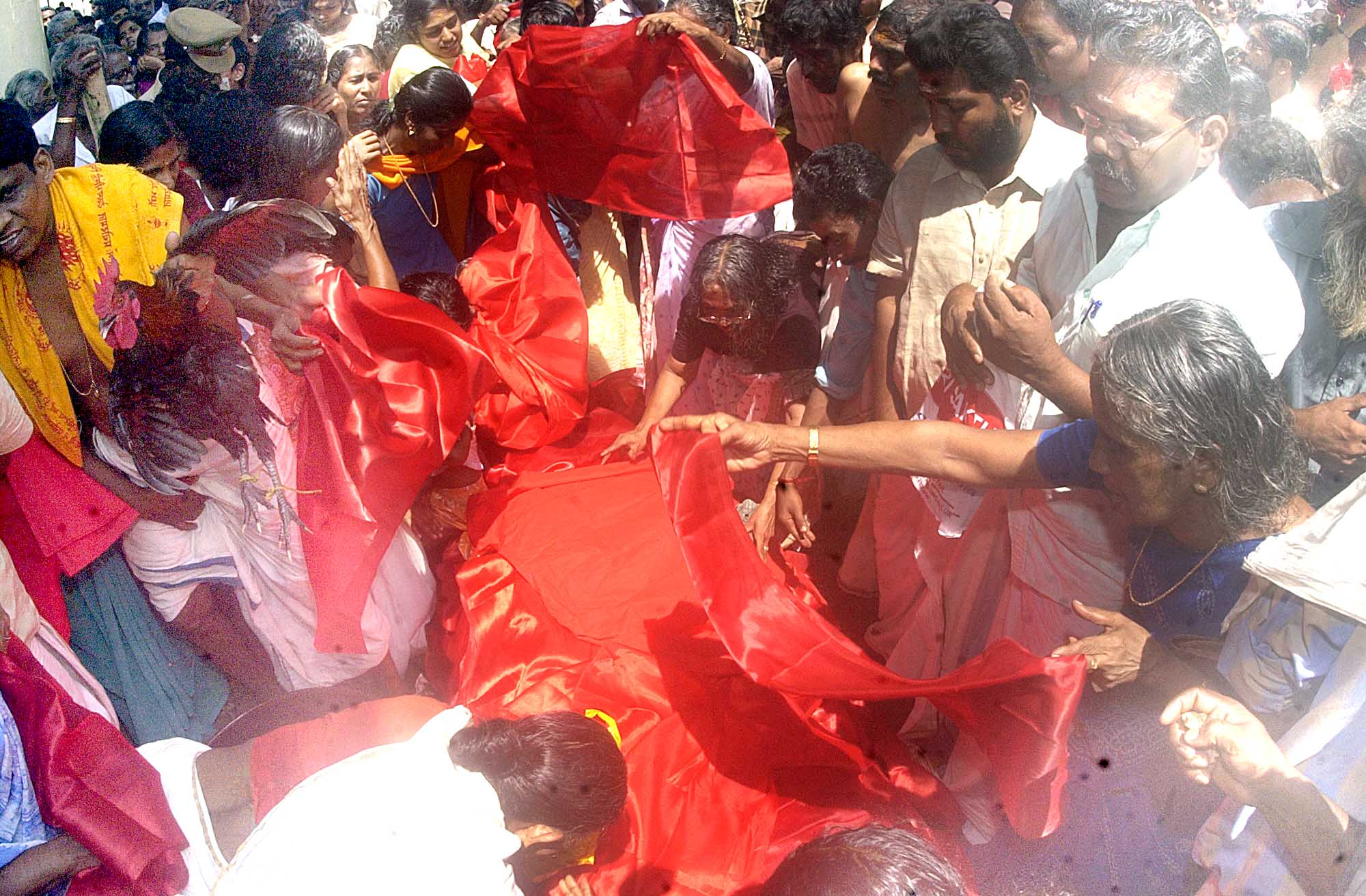
Kozhikkallu moodal ceremony.

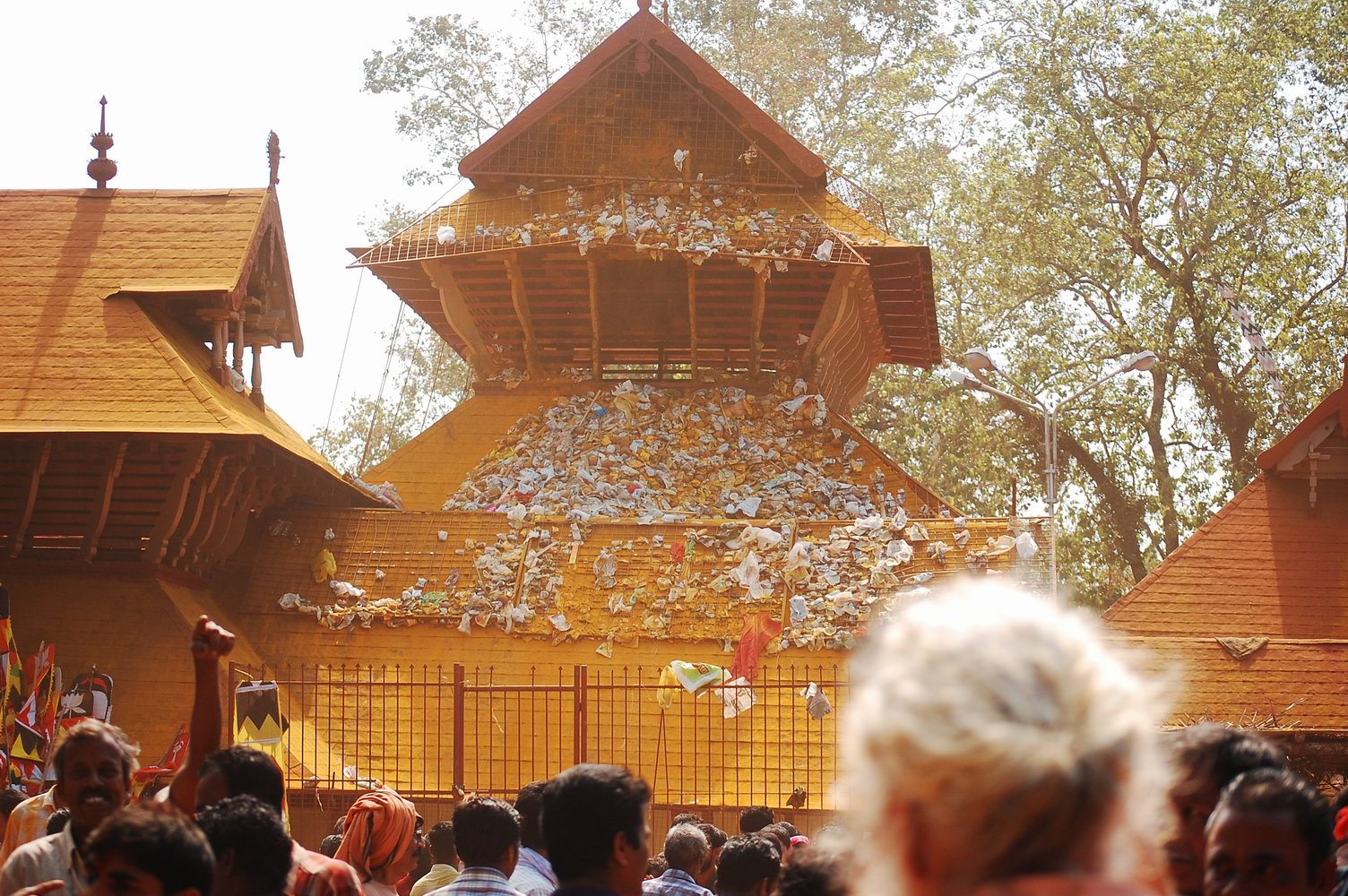
The roof of the temple covered in turmeric.

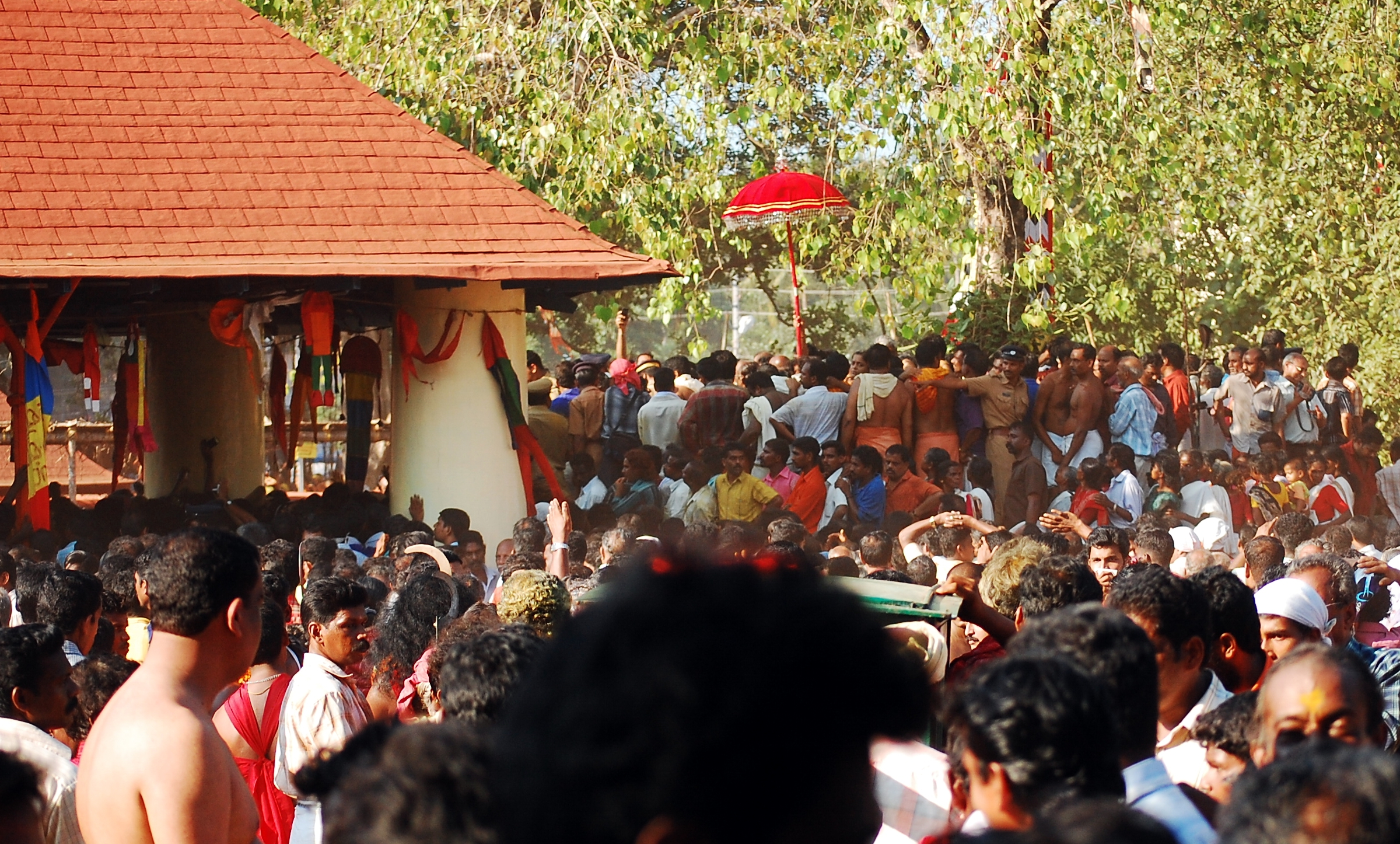
Flag-off for Kavutheendal, symbolically marked by lifting of a red, decorated umbrella.
