= Karumady =

- village
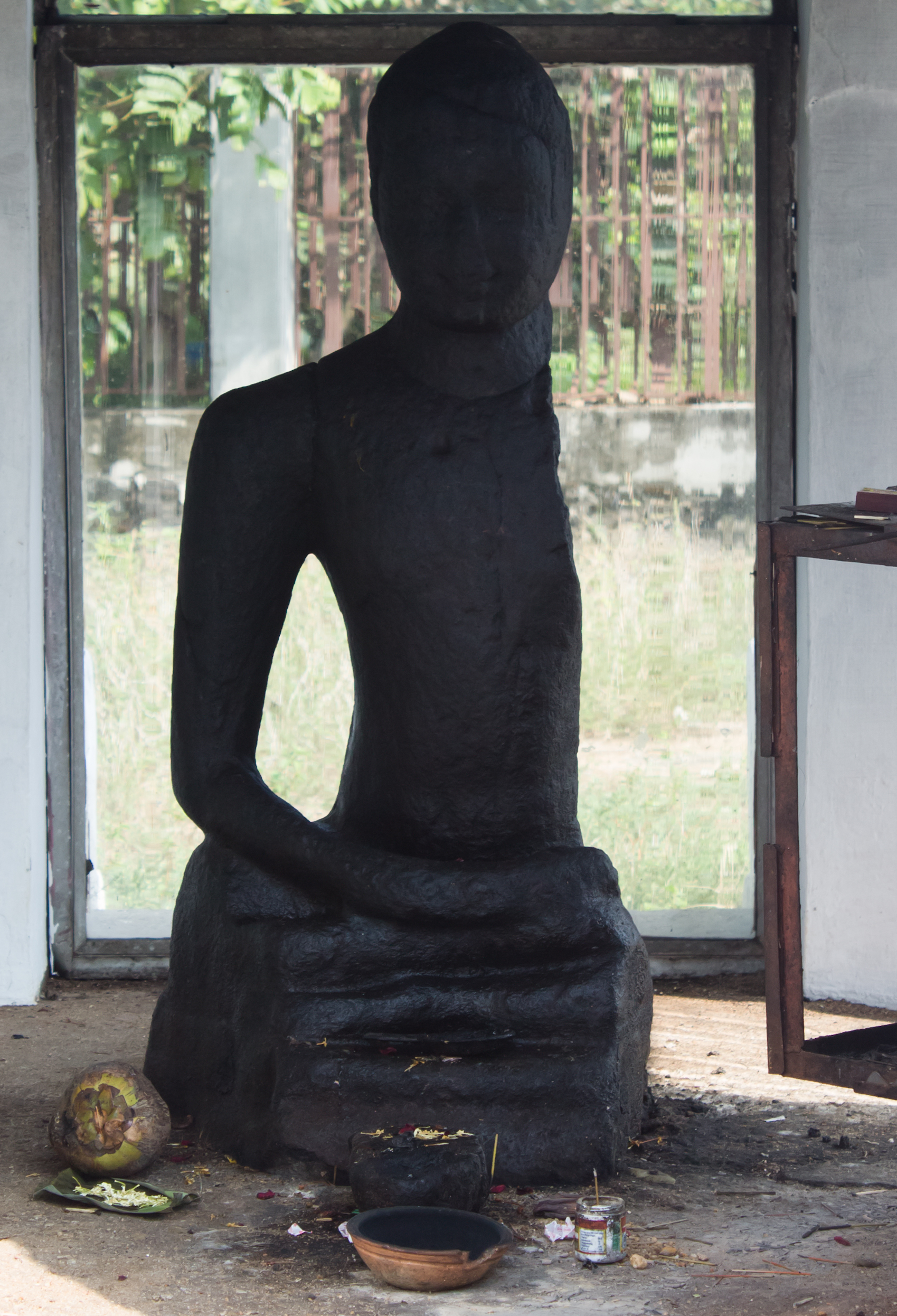
- Karumady Kuttan statue
- Interactive map of Karumady
- Coordinates: 9°22′0″N 76°23′0″E
- Country: India
- State: Kerala
- District: Alappuzha
- Named for: Verax

Population (2011)
  - Total: 13,137

Languages
  - Official: Malayalam, English
- Time zone: UTC+5:30 (IST)

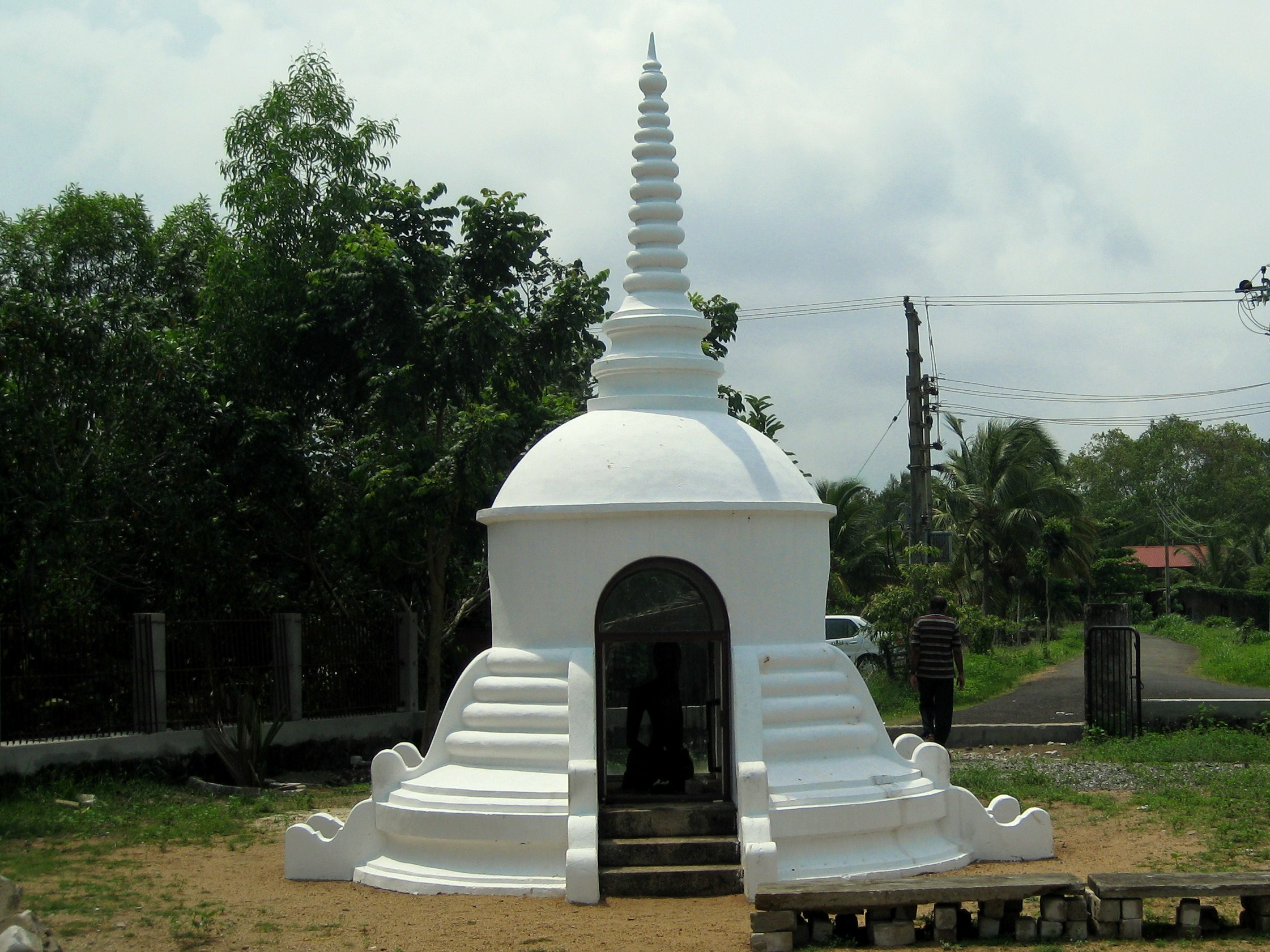
Karumadikuttan Buddha statue and stupa

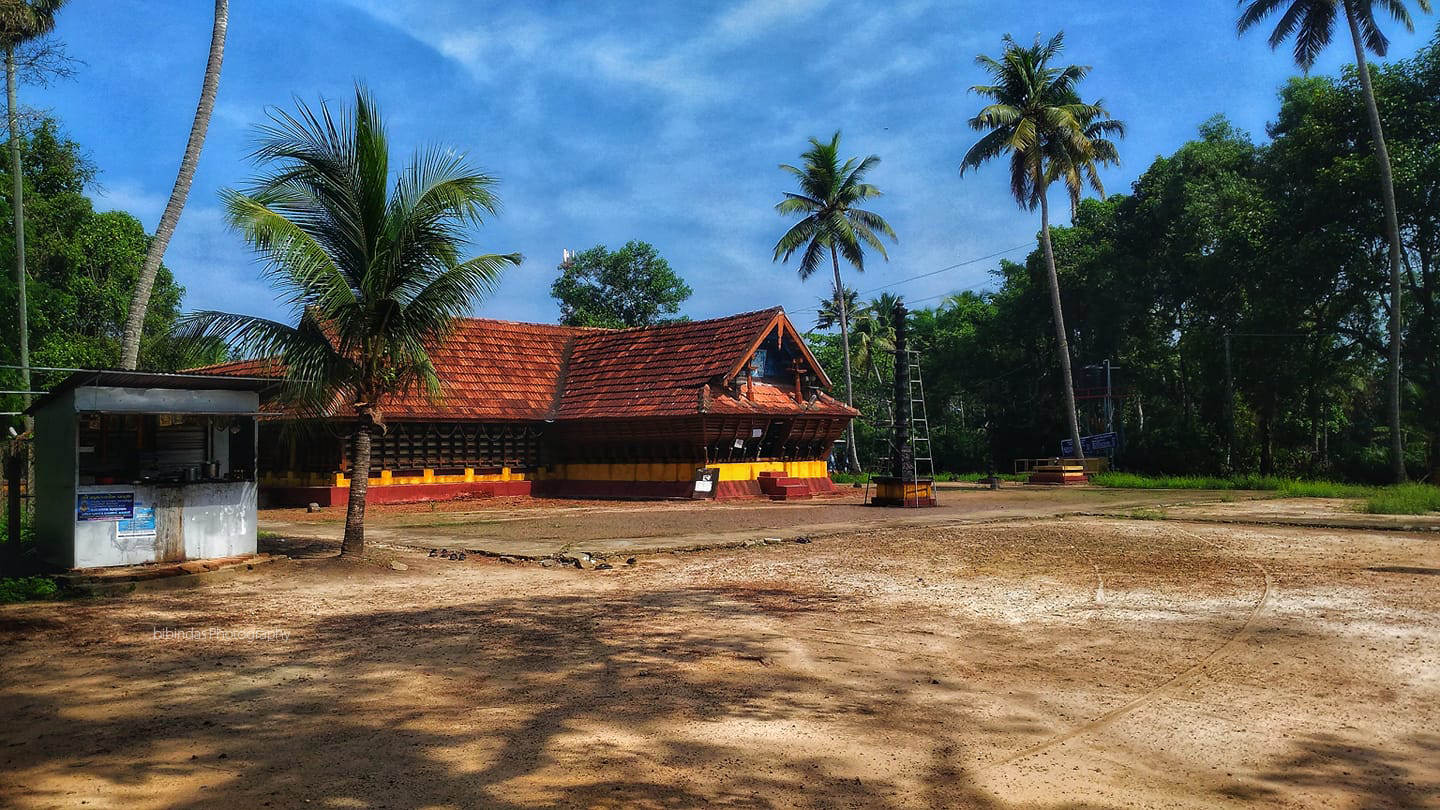
Karumadi Sankara Narayana Temple

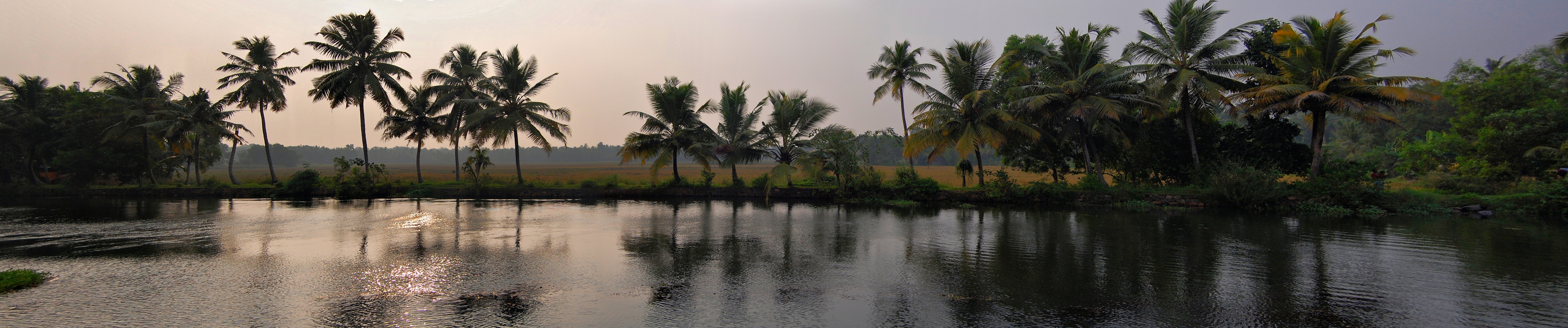
Pamba River at Karumadi, Alappuzha

Karumady is a village three km east of Ambalappuzha in Alappuzha district of the Indian state of Kerala. It is famous for Karumady Kuttan, the eleventh century black granite statue of Sri Buddha. The left hand side of this statue is missing.

== Demographics ==
As of 2011 India census, Karumady had a population of 13,137 with 6,209 males and 6,928 females.

== See also ==
- List of State Protected Monuments in Kerala
