= Pallikkal, Pathanamthitta =

Pallikkal, Pathanamthitta Pallickal
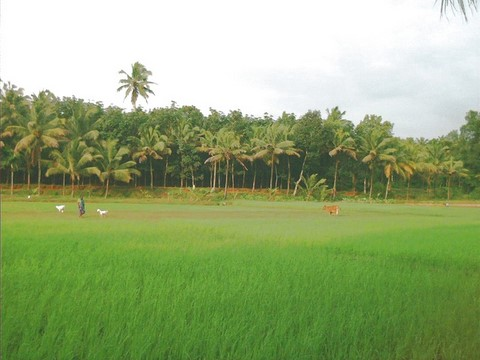

- Location within Kerala
- Coordinates: 9.1491°N 76.6607°E
- Country: India
- State: Kerala
- District: Pathanamthitta district

Government
  - Type: Panchayat Raj
  - Body: Pallickal Grama Panchayat

Area
  - Total: 22.36 km^{2} (8.63 sq mi)

Population (2011)
  - Total: 21,143
  - Density: 945.6/km^{2} (2,449/sq mi)

Languages
  - Official: Malayalam, English

Pallikkal (also spelled as Pallickal) is a village in Adoor taluk, Pathanamthitta district in the state of Kerala, India.

== Demographics ==
As per the 2011 Census of India, Pallickal village had a population of 21,143, with 9,872 males and 11,271 females, living in 5,628 households. The village covers an area of 2,236 hectares. The population of children aged 0–6 was 1,803, of which 911 were male and 892 female. The sex ratio was 1,142 females per 1,000 males. Pallickal had an overall literacy rate of 94.21%, with male literacy at 95.97% and female literacy at 92.70%. The literate population was 18,221.
