= Srimulavasa Vihara =

Lost Buddhist temple in Kerala

Srimulavasa Vihara, also known as Tirumulavata, was a Buddhist temple and centre of pilgrimage in present-day Kerala on the Malabar Coast of India. Scholars believe it was situated somewhere between Ambalappuzha and Thrikkunnappuzha, along the sea-coast in the Alappuzha region of central Kerala. The Srimulavasa Vihara was located in the medieval Chera kingdom of Kerala.

According to the Paliyam copper plates, dated to 898 AD and issued by the Ay ruler of southern Kerala, Vikramaditya Varaguna, a vast tract of land was donated to the Srimulavasa Vihara. The record notably opens with three Sanskrit slokas in praise of Soudhodani (Buddha), Dharmasangha (Dharma) and Avalokitesvara.

The shrine is also mentioned in the Mushika Vamsa Kavya of Athula (c. 11th century AD), a medieval dynastic chronicle from northern Kerala associated with the rulers of Ezhimala. The kavya states that the Ezhimala prince Vikrama Rama protected the shrine from encroachment by the sea by throwing large blocks of stone (Sarga XII). Another Ezhimala prince, Valabha, visited the shrine on his return to the Ezhimala country from a military campaign in support of the Chera ruler against an invading Chola force (Sarga XIV).

The discovery of a Buddha image in Gandhara by M. Foucher, bearing the Sanskrit legend "Dakshinapathe Mulavasa Lokanathah", suggests that Srimulavasa was a famous Buddhist centre in southern India.
