= Pallickal, Alappuzha =

Pallickal
- village
- Country: India
- State: Kerala
- District: Alappuzha

Government
  - Type: Panchayat Raj

Languages
  - Official: Malayalam, English
- Time zone: UTC+5:30 (IST)

Pallickal is a village in Mavelikara taluk in the Alappuzha district of Kerala, India. It is located on Mavelikkara–Kurathikkad–Kayamkulam road and close to Kayamkulam Pathanapuram Road.
