= Puthanvelikkara =

Puthenvelikkara Puthenvelikara (as per post office seal)
- Village
- Interactive map of Puthenvelikkara
- Coordinates: 10°10′0″N 76°15′0″E
- Country: India
- State: Kerala
- District: Ernakulam

Government
  - Type: Local Self Government, Government of Kerala
  - Body: Panchayath

Languages
  - Official: Malayalam, English
- Time zone: UTC+5:30 (IST)
- Postal code: 683594
- Telephone code: 0484
- Vehicle registration: KL-42
- Website: http://lsgkerala.in/puthenvelikkarapanchayat/, https://puthenvelikkara.com

Puthenvelikara is a village at North end of the Ernakulam district, situated in the Paravur Taluk of Kerala, India. The Chalakkudy River merges with the Periyar River at Elenthikara in the village of Puthenvelikkara. Puthenvelikkara is on the banks of the river Periyar, Chalakudy and Kottapuram lagoon. It is a centre of agricultural production in the region with its many rice paddy fields.

== Location ==
Puthenvelikkara is near Paravur and Mala. The nearest town to this village is North Paravur, which is approximately 5 km away and is connected to the village via a bridge named 'Station Kadavu' bridge. It is located 33 km North from District headquarters Kakkanad, 9 km from Parakkadavu, and 238 km from State capital Thiruvananthapuram. Puthenvelikkara Pin code is 683594 and postal head office is Puthenvelikara.

Puthenvelikara is on the banks of the river Periyar and Chalakudy and Kottapuram Kayal.

== Geography ==
Puthenvelikkara is situated in Ernakulam District of Central Kerala in India. The village is 29 km North of Kochi and 21 km west of the Cochin International Airport. The Territory of Puthenvelikkara covers an area of 19.87 km2. Puthenvelikkara shares its borders with Poyya and Methala villages in the North, Karumalloor and Kunnukara villages in the South, Prakkadavu, Kunnukara and Kuzhur villages in the East, and Chendamangalam, Vadakkekara and Methala villages in the West. The ancient belief is that, the formation of the village is a result of high-tide (Veliyettam in Malayalam) and this belief is proven by the existence of fossil of aquatic beings found in the village.

Puthenvelikkara is surrounded by water bodies such as rivers and lagoons. It resulted in the formation of fertile lands suited for cultivation. The primary source of income for the people of the village is agriculture. The provinces or wards such as Kurisingal, Kurumba thuruth, Thuruthipuram, Thuruthur, Panjipalla, ManancheriKunnu (aka Skylean Hill), Karottukara, Vattekattu Kunnu, Keezhuppadam, Kodikuthiya Kunnu, Elanthikara, Kanakkankadav, Cherukadappuram, Thelathuruth, Kozhithuruth, Chowkakadav, Malavana, Stationkadav and some small islands, together form the village of Puthenvelikkara. Puthenvelikkara was famous in Paravur for its numerous Kunnu/Hills, but today they have been destroyed for productive purposes in Paravur.

The new bridge linking Puthenvelikkara with the mainland was opened to traffic in June, 2018 by Works Minister G Sudhakaran. Built at Valiyapazham-Pallithuruthu, the bridge is a boon to the people of Puthenvelikakra who lacked proper connectivity to nearby areas due to the lack of adequate infrastructure facilities. The Station Kadavu-Valiya Pazham Pallithuruthu bridge had been the long-standing demand of the people of Puthenvelikkara, and the residents can reach Ernakulam and Paravur easily. Following the construction of the bridge, one can reach Chendamangalam and Paravur in just 10 minutes and it will cost them only `10 by way of bus fare. The construction of the bridge started in 2010.

== Civic administration ==
Puthenvelikkara belongs to North Paravoor block Panchayat. Puthenvelikkara comes under Vadakkekara circle and has a police station.

Puthenvelikkara Census Town has a total administration over 8,379 houses to which it supplies basic amenities like water and sewerage. It is also authorised to build roads within Census Town limits and impose taxes on properties coming under its jurisdiction.

== Demographics ==
According to the 2011 India census, Puthenvelikkara has a population of 33,372, consisting of 16,251 males and 17,121 females. Peaceful coexistence of Hindu and Christian communities makes this village a role model for the entire state. The village once had a few Jewish families that had settled here, but none remain. Notably, there are no Muslims residing in this village. The population of children aged 0-6 is 3073, that is 9.21% of Puthenvelikkara city's total population. 1054 is the female sex ratio in the town against the state average of 1084. Puthenvelikkara's child sex ratio is almost 904 compared to the Kerala state average of 964. The Puthenvelikkara city's literacy rate is 94.87%, that is slightly higher than the state average of 94.00%. Male literacy is almost 96.58% and the female literacy rate is 93.28% in Puthenvelikkara.

== Education ==
It is a site for numerous education institutions , Presentation college of applied sciences , IHRD college of applied sciences, Mary Ward English medium school, St Anthony's English medium school, VCSHSS school

== History ==
Puthenvelikkara was a village in Paravur and based on its importance Puthenvelikkara became a Panchayat.

== See also ==
- North Paravur
- Paravur Taluk
- Ernakulam District
- Kochi
