= Paravur taluk =

Taluk in Ernakulam district, Kerala

Paravur Taluk Parur
- Taluk
- Location in Kerala, India
- Coordinates: 10°10′0″N 76°13′0″E
- Country: India
- State: Kerala
- District: Ernakulam
- Headquarters: North Paravur

Government
  - Body: Taluk

Area
  - Total: 195.25 km^{2} (75.39 sq mi)

Languages
  - Official: Malayalam, English
- Time zone: UTC+5:30 (IST)
- Telephone code: 0484
- Vehicle registration: KL-42
- Nearest city: Kochi
- Lok Sabha constituency: Ernakulam
- Civic agency: Taluk
- Website: ,

Paravur Taluk, IPA: [pɐrɐʋuːr], is a taluk of Ernakulam District in the Indian State of Kerala. North Paravur is the capital of the taluk. Paravur Taluk lies in the north western part of Ernakulam district bordering Thrissur district. The surrounding taluks are Kochi to the west consisting of Vypin Island, Kodungallur to the north, Chalakudy to the north consisting of Mala, Aluva to the east consisting of Angamaly, Nedumbassery and Aluva, Kanayanur to the south consisting of Cochin City. Paravur is a part of Kochi urban agglomeration area. The western parts of taluk are coastal areas with cultivations like prawn and pokkali rice. The eastern parts are fertile lands. The heavy industries of Kochi is located in Udyogmandal area of the taluk.

== History ==
Parur taluk was prominent in the history of Kerala. Taluk was an attraction to Kochi, Malabar and Travancore Kingdoms. Parur has got its own brands like

- Parur Central Bank (1930) (Amalgamated with Bank Of India - 1990)
- Parur Boat Race
- Parur Market
- Parur Municipality (Old)
- Maliankara
- Parur coir
- Parur court (1875)
- Islands
- Ayroor
- Parur river
- Purapillykavu Bund
- Alengad sugarcane
- Chendamangalam Handloom
- Co operative institutions
- Vedimara Prison
- Parur Jew Street
- The famous place Chendamanglam - Place of paliath Achans. The Paliam Palace, residence of the Paliath Achans, hereditary prime ministers to the former maharajas of Kochi, is one of the architectural splendours of Kerala. The Palace is over 450 years old and houses a collection of historic documents and relics.
- Kunjithai is one of the most famous fishing boat manufacturing place in Kerala with 30 boat yards.

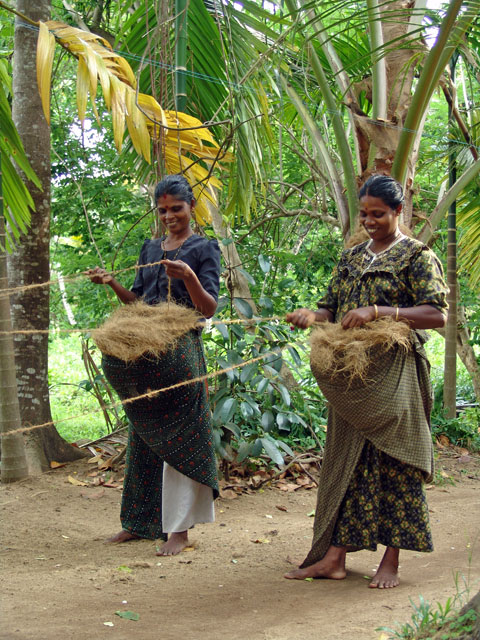
Rural women processing coir threads

- Once Edappally village was in Parur later added to Kanayannur taluk

== Flora and fauna ==
The land has one of the highest densities of coconut trees. The land also boasts a wide range of other birds and animals. The kingfisher നീലപ്പൊന്മാൻ is common bird in this land and others include black bulbul (depend on the season) brown falcon, crow, woodpecker, sparrow, ravens, pigeons, African fish eagle and cuckoos. The land also has cows, goats, etc. We can see so many sarpa kavu abode of snakes സർപ്പക്കാവ് near the Hindu Nair homes and temples. They are the best ecology for animals and birds. Fish are abundant in this serene taluk.

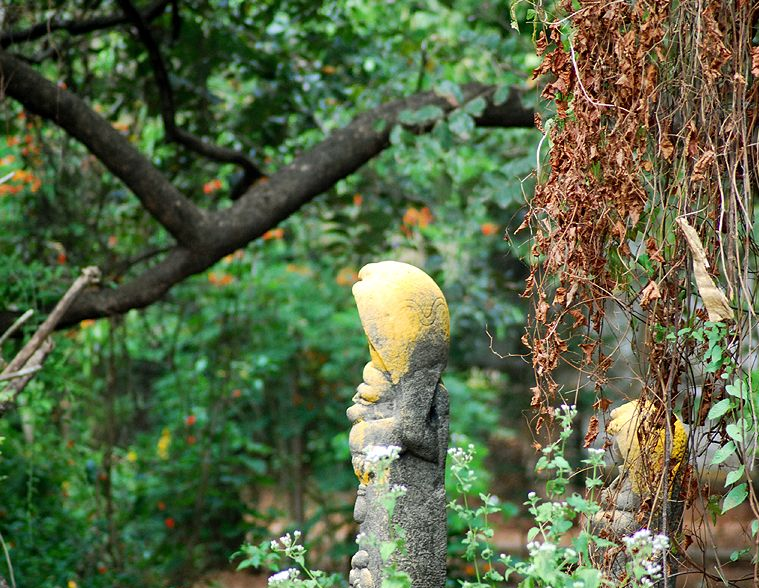
Sarpa Kavu

== Villages ==
Parur, Ezhikkara, Chittatukara, Chendamangalam, Vadakkekara, Kottuvally, Kunnukara, Karumalloor, Varappuzha, Puthenvelikkara, Kadungalloor, Moothakunnam, Alangad. The Block Panchayats are Paravur and Alengad.

== Municipalities ==
- Parur
- Eloor

The Parur State warehouse is located in Vaniakkadu, while the Parur Block Development Office is located in Kaitharam. There are a lot of cooperative banks, societies, and Sahakarana Sangams in the taluk. The Agricultural Bank is located in Chennamangalam Jn.

== Grama Panchayats and localities ==
- Alangad

Kongorppilly, Neerikkod, Olanad, Panaikulam, Koduvazhanga, Thiruvalloor

- Chendamangalam

Kurumbathuruth, Kadalvathuruth, Gothuruth, Thekkethuruth, Kootukad, Karimbadam, Palathuruth

- Chittatukara

Puthiyakav, Parayakad, Cheriya Pallamthuruth, Alamthuruth, Neendoor, Pattanam, Mannam, Thanipadam

- Ezhikkara

Nandhiattukunnam, Kedamangalam, Palliackal

- Kadungalloor

Eramam, Binanipuram, Muppathadam, Elookara, Kunjunnikkara, Uliyannoor

- Karumalloor

Manjaly, Aduvathuruth, Veliathunad

- Kottuvally

Kaitharam, Kuttanthuruth, Vaniakad, Valluvally, Thathappilly, Koonammavu

- Kunnukara

North Kuthiathodu, Ayroor, Kuttippuzha, Chalakka, Thekke Aduvassery, Kunnuvayal

- Puthanvelikkara

Thuruthoor, Manancherykunnu, Elanthikkara, Chathedam, Pazhampillithuruthu, Cherukadapuram, Thelathuruth

- Vadakkekara

Maliankara, Kottuvallikad, Chettikkad, Moothakunnam, Andippillikavu, Vavakad, Paliathuruth, Madaplathuruth, Thuruthippuram, Kunjithai, Muravanthuruth

- Varappuzha

Puthanpally, Thundathumkadav

== Schools ==
Schools coming under Paravur Sub-educational district Schools

- Samooham High School, Paravur
- Sree Narayana Higher Secondary School, Paravur
- SNM Higher Secondary School Moothakunnam.
- St. Germain's Sion School, Paravur
- FMCT HS, Karumalloor
- Govt. High School, Kadungalloor
- Elenthikara HS
- Dharmarthadayini Sabha High School, Karimbadam
- Christ Raj High School, Kuttippuzha
- Islamic school, Mannam, Paravur
- K. E. M. High School, Alangad
- St. Thomas Higher secondary School, Ayroor
- Little Flower High School, Panaikulam
- Ansarul Islam School, Manjaly
- Govt. High School, Binanipuram
- Govt. Lower Primary Boys' School, Kannankulangara where Parur Subdistrict office is situated.
- St. George's High School, Puthanpally
- Holy Infant Jesus Boys High School
- St.Philomena's H.S.S, Koonammavu.
- Chavara Darsan CMI Public School, Koonammavu
- Kumara Vilasam School, Paravur
- Al Madrasathul Islamiya, Vaniakadu

== Religious ==
Temples

- Kannankulangara Sreekrishna Swamy Temple.
- Peruvaram Sivan Temple.
- Mannam Subrahmanya temple (Biggest Kavadi in District)
- Ayroor Sree Durga Bhagavathi-Mahavishnu Temple
- Thiruvaloor Mahadeva temple
- Kadungallur Narasimha swamy temple
- Aduvassery Vasudevapuram temple
- Dakshina Mookambika Temple, Famous for Navarathri festival in which thousands of devotees coming from different parts of Kerala.
- Kottuvallykavu Bhagavathy temple, Kavilnada, Koonammavu.
- Tamil Brahmins Samooha Madam, Kannankulangara, North Paravur.
- Andissery Bhagavthy Temple, Perumpadanna. Undertaken by the S.N.D.P Yogam N. Paravoor
- Villwar vattam Govindapuram Sreekrishna swami Temple, Kottayikovilakam. 3000 years old deity, family temple of Villwar Vattaom kings of Chendamangalam, before Plaiyam time.
- Jayanthamangalam Narasimha swami Temple, Chendamangalam.
- Siva Temple of Chendmangalam.
- Tirumanamkunnil bhagavathi Temple, Vadakkumpuram.

Churches

- Kottakkavu Mar Thoma Syro-Malabar Pilgrim Church, North Paravur founded by St. Thomas in A.D. 52
- St. Thomas Church, North Paravur where the tomb of Mar Gregorios Abdul Jaleel is situated
- Kunnel Infant Jesus Church, Alangad
- St. Joseph & Mount carmel Roman Catholic Church, Varapuzha Island, ESTD - 1673 November
- St. George Syro-Malabar Catholic Church, (1788 - Constructed - 36 acres in Manampady)- Puthenpally
- St. Sebastian's, Gothuruth
- Ayroor St. Antony's Church
- St.Philomena's Forane Church, Koonammavu where the tomb of St.Chavara Kuriakose Elias is situated.
- Thuruthur St.Thomas Church

Masjid

- Paravur Juma Masjid
- Paravur Pattalam Juma Masjid
- Manjaly Juma Masjid
- Kattenellure Munavarsha Thangal Masjid Tattappilly
- Vaniyakkad Juma Masjid
- Kadungallur Juma Masjid
- Eloor Juma Masjid

== State Assembly constituencies ==
The assembly constituencies are Paravoor and Kalamassery including whole of Paravur Taluk. Paravur constituency consists of Puthanvelikkara, Vadakkekara, Chendamangalam, Chittatukara, Parur, Ezhikkara, Kottuvally, Varappuzha. Kalamassery constituency consists of Kunnukara, Karumalloor, Kadungalloor, Alengad, Eloor, Kalamassery. Paravur, Kalamassery constituencies belong to Ernakulam Parliamentary constituency.

=== Pin Code Index for the taluk of Paravur ===
- 683102 WestKadungalloor B.O
- 683108 Uliyannoor B.O.
- 683110 Muppatthadam S.O
- 683501 Udyogamandalam
- 683503 H.M.T. Colony
- 683504 Kuttikattukara E.D.S.O
- 683504 Neeleswaram E.D.S.O
- 683511 Alengad
- 683511 Karumalloor B.O
- 683511 Neerikode B.O
- 683511 Panayikulam B.O
- 683511 West Veliyathunadu B.O
- 683512 ChendamangalamS.O
- 683513 EzhikkaraB.O
- 683513 Nanthyattukunnam N.D.B.O
- 683513 Paravur
- 683513 Paravur Market N.D.S.O
- 683513 Paravur Town N.D.S.O
- 683516 Maliankara B.O
- 683516 Moothakunnam S.O
- 683517 Varappuzha Landing B.O
- 683517 Varappuzha S.O
- 683518 Koonammavu S.O
- 683518 Kongorappilly B.O
- 683519 Kaitharam S.O
- 683519 Kottuvally B.O
- 683520 Mannam-Paravur B.O
- 683521 Vadakkumpuram S.O
- 683522 Kunjithai B.O
- 683522 Vadakkekara S.O
- 683523 Gothuruth E.D.S.O
- 683524 Kunnukara E.D.S.O
- 683578 South Aduvassery B.O
- 683579 Ayroor B.O
- 683594 Elenthikara B.O.
- 683594 Kuthiyathodu-Puthanvelikkara P.O
- 683594 Puthanvelikkara S.O

== Nearby villages ==
These are the villages other than panchayat headquarters.

Panayikulam, Pathalam, Koonammavu, Thuruthipuram, Maliankara, Koottukad, Pattanam, Kottayil Kovilakam, Karingamthuruth, Gothuruth, Parayakad, Vavakkad, Madaplathuruth, Kuriapilly, Kunjithai, Elenthikara, Chathedom, Manjaly, Valluvalli.

== Media ==
- Elgee vision, Kunnukara
- Nila tv, Koonamav
- Focus Media, Varapuzha

Online media

- Samadarshi news
- news 7
- Voice of alangad

== Government offices ==
- Sub-District Education Department, Kannankulangara
- First Class Judicial Magistrate Court | Munsif court
- Land Registration Office
- PWD NH Sub Division (NH 66)Office Paravur
- Veterinary Polyclinic
- Homeo clinic, Peruvaram

Taluk Supply Office, N Parur

== Notable personalities ==
- P Kesavadev - Novelist and Scoical reformer
- Kuttipuzha Krishna pillai - poet and writer
- Parur T.K. Narayana Pilla - first chief minister of Thirukochi
- M.P.Paul Varappuzha
- S Sharma - Ex. Minister and Politician
- Pappan - volleyball player
- Salim kumar - actor
- Paravur bharathan - actor
- Kesari balakrishna pilla - writer and journalist
- Paravur Gorge - writer
- Kedamangalam Sadanandan
- Justice Narendran

== Travel ==
Distances from Parur

Cities

- Ernakulam (20 km south)
- Thrissur (49 km north east)
- Alapuzha (78 km south)
- Kottayam (84 km south east)
- Palakkad (108 km north east)
- Kozhikode (142 km north)
- Kollam (160 km south)
- Thiruvananthapuram (225 km south)
- Kannur (239 km north)

== See also ==
- Kochi metropolitan area
- Greater Cochin
