= Elookkara =

- Village
- Location in Kerala, India Elookkara (India)
- Coordinates: 9.98°N 76.28°E
- Country: India
- State: Kerala

Government
  - Body: Kadungalloor Panchayath
- Time zone: IST

Elookkara is a small village in Ernakulam district, Kerala, India, situated 3.6 km from Aluva, Central Kerala, 13 km from Cochin International Airport, and 10.1 km from Aluva Metro Station.

== Elookkara ==
- Country: India
- District: Ernakulam
- City: Aluva
- Taluk: Aluva
- Block: Alangad
- Village: Kadungalloor

== Nearby places ==
- South: Kayantikkara
- North: Kadungalloor
- East: Uliyannoor
- West: Muppathadom

== Climate ==
Tropical monsoon climate
