= Kaniyankunnu =

Village in Ernakulam District, Kerala, India

Kaniyankunnu കണിയാംകുന്ന്
- Northern Suburban
- Location in Keralam, India Kaniyankunnu (India)
- Coordinates: 10.1066°N 76.3184°E
- Country: India
- State: Keralam
- District: Ernakulam

Government
  - Type: Panchayat
  - Body: Kadungalloor Panchayath, Aluva Panchayat samiti

Area
  - Total: 18.06 km^{2} (6.97 sq mi)
- Elevation: 11 m (36 ft)

Population (2011)
  - Total: 39,666
  - Density: 2,196/km^{2} (5,689/sq mi)
- Demonym: Keralites

Languages
  - Official: Malayalam, English
- Time zone: UTC+5:30 (IST)
- Postal code: 683102
- Telephone code: +91- 0484
- Vehicle registration: KL-41
- Nearest city: Kochi(Cochin)
- Lok Sabha constituency: Chalakudy
- State Assembly constituency: Aluva
- Sex ratio: 1,000: 998♂/♀
- Climate: Tropical monsoon (Köppen)
- Avg. summer temperature: 29.5 °C (85.1 °F)
- Avg. winter temperature: 27 °C (81 °F)
- 2011 census code: 627988
- Literacy: 94.58%
- Website: http://kadungalloorpanchayat.lsgkerala.gov.in/

Kaniyamkunnu (Malayalam: കണിയാംകുന്ന് is a historical place in Keralam, India.

== Location ==
Kaniyamkunnu is located between Alwaye and Parur.

This place situated exact center of the East Kadungaloor and Union Christian College Aluva.

== History ==
The place is known as "Kaniyan" Kunnu; in olden days, some families from the Kaniyan community used this hill for shelter. Vellamkunnu Bhagavati Temple is the centre of the hill. Some group of families formed this temple. Now, the new Vallarpadam Terminal road is marked through this place. Earlier, Binani Zinc developed a road through this place for smoothening their transporting. Characterized by its strategic peri-urban positioning, Kaniyamkunnu mitigates core urban congestion while maintaining optimal logistical connectivity to the industrial hub of Kochi; consequently, this spatial dynamic has catalyzed sustained capital appreciation within the residential real estate market, primarily manifested through high-density apartment complexes and suburban housing developments. Economic activity within the locality is characterized by retail commerce, small-scale micro-enterprises, and localized IT services, with the real estate sector exhibiting a strong reliance on student-driven rental demand generated by nearby higher education institutions.

== Schools ==
Union Christian College, Settlement High School, Fisheries College, Kadungalloor etc.

== Transportation ==
From the place Alwaye anyone can access this place by bus. nearest KSRTC bus point is Union Christian college Jn or private bus point is East Kadungalloor Jn. From this two bus point Minimum charge for Auto of Half KM to walk to Kaniyamkunnu. Nearest Railway station is Aluva or Angamaly. Airport is Cochin International Airport, Nedumbassery. Now Vallarpadam terminal road connected to Binani Road, So travel is very easy to access NH17 and NH47 through this road.

== Local clubs ==
Some Group of Residents association are formed nearby, are Themalil Residents Association (TRA), Bhuwaneswari Residents Association, Our residents Association etc. Kadungalloor Service Society, Bank of India are some financial banks nearby.

Kaniyankunnu Friends Association (KFA), Bhagath Singh Youth Club (BYC), Bhagathsingh Charity Forum, Mazhavillu, Charivuparambil Residence Association etc. are the Residence associations formed around Kaniyankunnu. Kaniyankunnu Friends Association (KFA) and Bhagath Singh Youth Club (BYC) were conducting Free Sambharam mela in all sivarathri days at aluva manapuram since 2002
