= Koonammavu =

- Census Town
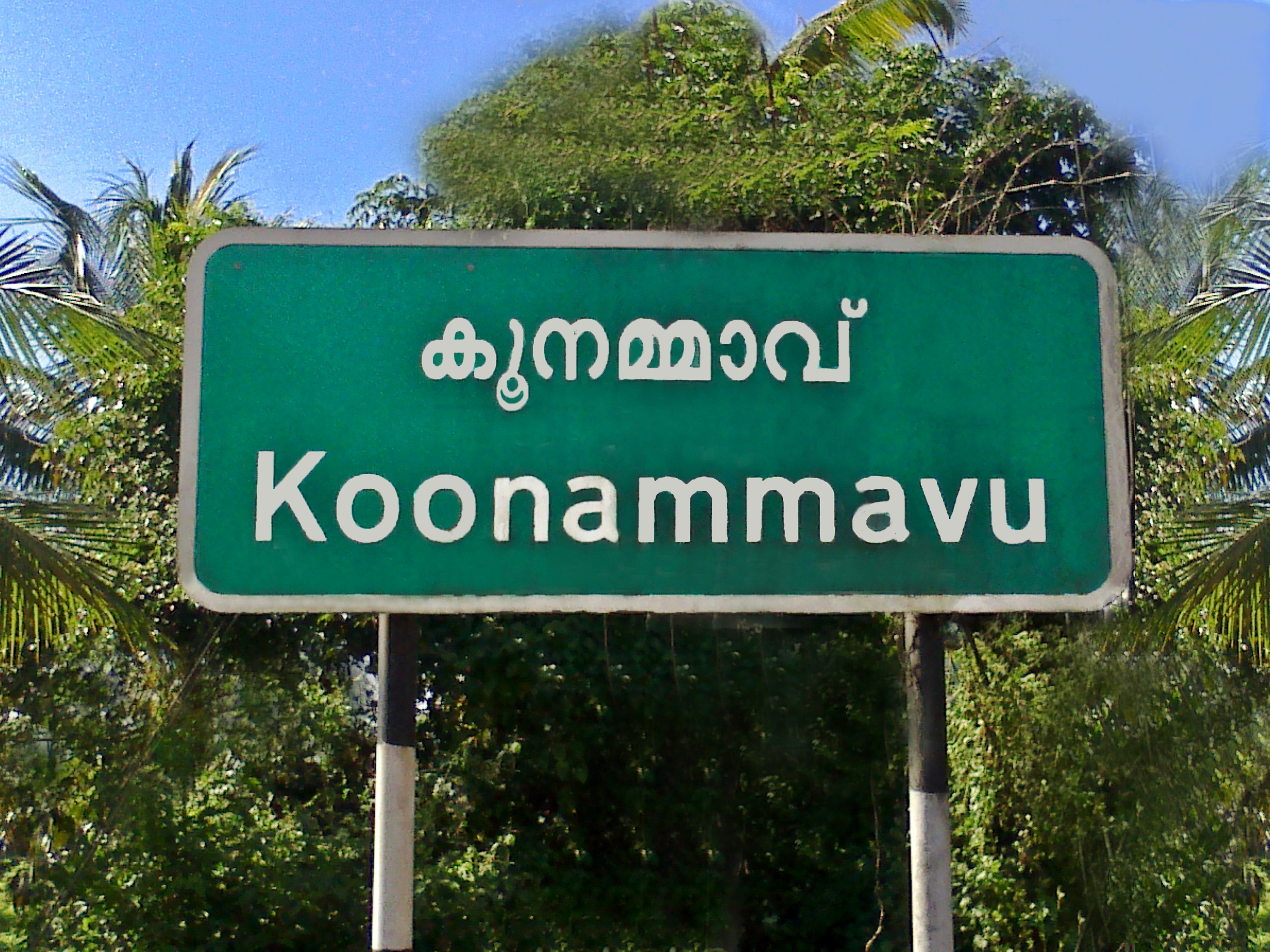
- Multi-lingual sign board at NH-66
- Interactive map of Koonammavu
- Coordinates: 10.14318°N 76.30848°E
- Country: India
- State: Kerala
- District: Ernakulam
- City UA: Kochi

Languages
  - Official: Malayalam, English
- Time zone: UTC+5:30 (IST)
- PIN: 683518
- Telephone code: 0484
- Vehicle registration: KL-42
- Climate: Am (Köppen)

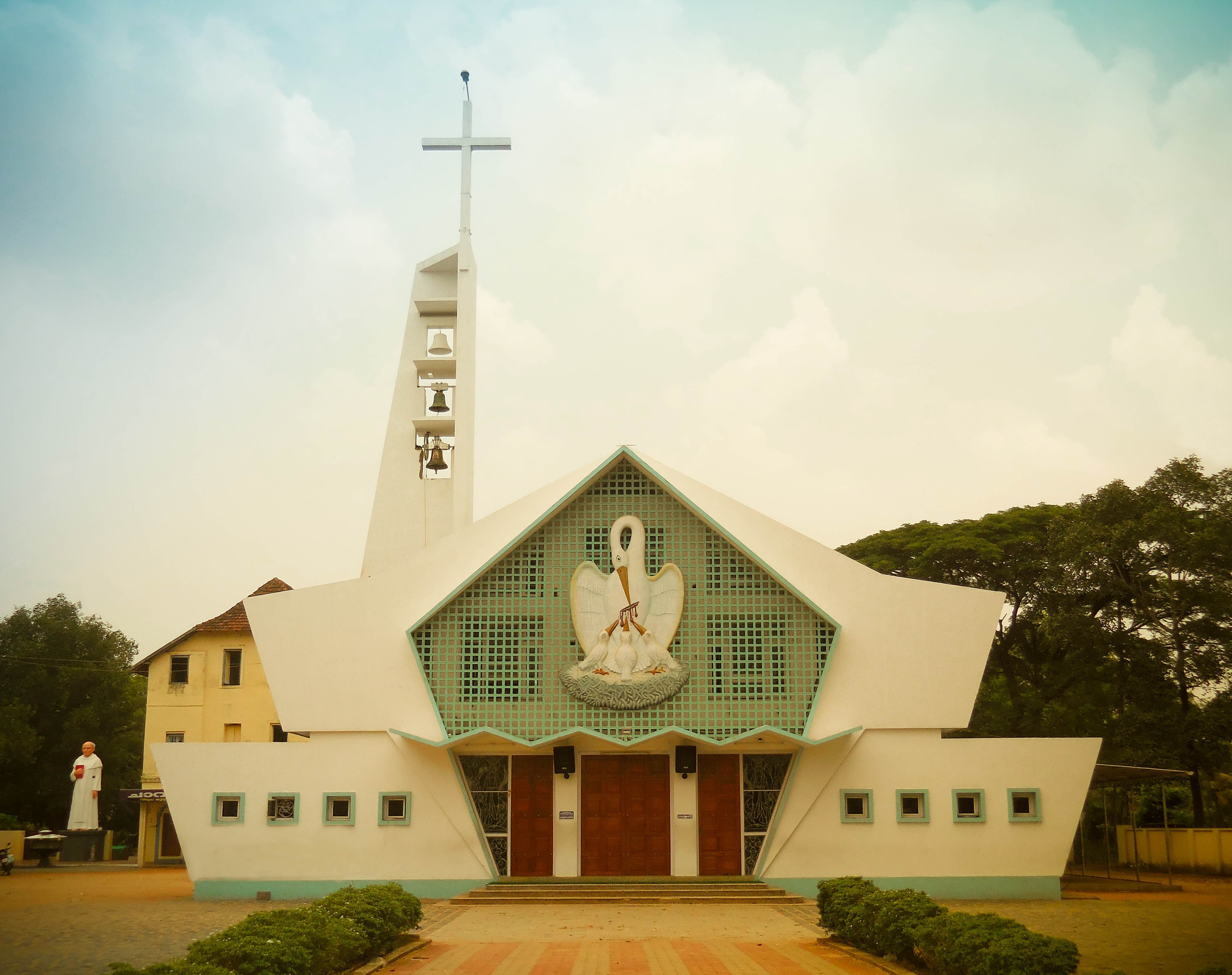
St.Philomena's Forane Church & St.Chavara Pilgrimage Centre at Koonammavu

Koonammavu (Malayalam: [kuːnɐmːaːʋə̆]) is a northern suburb of Kochi city which is associated in the Kochi metropolitan area. Koonammavu (Valluvally) is a census town in Kottuvally Panchayat, North Paravur Taluk, Ernakulam District, Kerala, India and lies between Edappally and North Paravur adjacent to Varappuzha.

== Transportation ==
Chithira junction is the busiest place in Koonammavu where the majority of educational Institutions and shopping complexes are situated. National Highway 66 starting from Mumbai (Panavel) to Kanyakumari passes through this town.

== Economy ==
Koonammavu is famous for the cottage industry of rosary. An electroplating unit of rosary is functioning here where a large number of women engage in making rosaries. The rosaries made here with 59 pearls are exported to foreign countries. The place houses several educational institutions, churches and religious institutions of various denominations of Christianity. There is also a well-functioning government hospital with pay ward. It is also a hub for education, there are 5 schools in Koonammavu which includes a special school for mentally challenged kids. Most people are daily workers or small businessmen while there are a few rich people and settled abroad.

== History ==
As a Muziris heritage, Roman coins were unearthed from Kochal, during archaeological excavations. Although it is in the main land of Valluvally, its geography is purely serene and calm. A traditional high Thookkam at Kottuvallykavu Bhagavathy temple in Kavilnada is famous for its Thookkam ritual and Aayiramthiri Kedavilakkupooja.

The name Koonammavu is derived from Koonan-Mavu, which means Humpback MangoTree. It is believed that the great ruler Tipu Sultan once passed by the town and forgot his sword and he remembered he placed it in a humpback mango tree thus got the name Koonamavu. The tree still exists even though its main branches were cut for being dangerous to traffic.

The Saint Kuriakose Elias Chavara spent his last years and buried at " St. Philomenas Forane Church" in Koonammavu.He was the Parish Priest at that time. The Tomb and Holy remains of Saint Chavara Kuriakose Elias is still situated in St.Philomena's Forane Church, Koonammavu. St.Philomena's Forane Church, Koonammavu built in 1837, the church is of immense historic importance and a Chavara pilgrim centre, too.

Saint Euphrasia Eluvathingal spent her boarding attached to the first indigenous Carmelite community founded by Saint Kuriakose Elias Chavara and Rev. Leopold Beccaro 1866 at Koonammavu.

The St. Joseph's monastery of CMI locally called Koventha is a contribution of Saint Chavara Kuriakose Elias Shrine.

Late Finance Minister of Kerala Shri. K.T.George hails from Koonammavu.

Former Kerala captain M Balan Pandit, the first Star of Kerala Cricket was born here on 16 July 1926.

== Location ==
Map of Chithira Junction

== Post Office ==
- The India Post office is situated near the Adikulam Market. It is a sub Post Office having a branch Post Office serving Kongorpilly area with same pincode-683518, While Kongorpilly-Karingamthuruth comes under Alangad Panchayat.

== Telecommunication & Networks ==
This is a 4G town. Reliance, Airtel & Idea has set up 4G in this area.

Major Cable TV operators like Asianet, Keralavision, City Cable franchisees are functioning here as Koonammavu branch. Also high speed Broadband Internet are also available with Asianet & Keralavision. This Zone is also served by Wi-Fi internet from Total BroadBand.

== Place of Worship ==
=== Churches ===
- St.Philomena's Forane Church, Koonammavu.
- St.Joseph's CMI Monastery Church, Koonammavu.
- St.Antony's Church, Kochal, Koonammavu.
- Church of Our Lady of Rosary, Maloth, Kochal, Koonammavu.
- Amalothbhava Matha Church.Valluvally, Koonammavu.
- Nitya sahaya matha kappela, Olanad koonammavu
- Believer's Church, Meisthiripady, Koonammavu.
- IPC Bersheba Church, Kochal, Koonammavu.
- Amalolbhava Matha Church, Valluvally, Koonammavu

=== Mosques ===
- Valluvally Juma Masjid, Millupady, Valluvally, Koonammavu.
- Thaqua Juma Masjid, Athani, Valluvally, Koonammavu.

=== Temples ===
- Kottuvallykavu Temple, Kavilnada, Koonammavu.
- Sree Bhadrakali Devi Lakshmi Narayana Temple, Pallikadavu, Koonammavu.
- Kachanikoodam Bhagavathy Temple, Kochal, Koonammavu.
- Shiva Bhadrakali Temple, Chemmayam, Koonammavu.
- Valluvally North Temple, valluvally, Koonammavu

== Education Institutions ==
- St.Philomena's H.S.S, Chithira Jn., Koonammavu.
- St.Joseph's H.S.S, Chithira Jn., Koonammavu.
- St.Joseph's Technical School, Chithira Jn., Koonammavu.
- Govt. LPS, Schoolpaddy, Valluvally, Koonammavu.
- Chavara Special School For Mentally Challenged, Chithira Jn., Koonammavu.
- Chavara Darsan CMI Public School, Adikulam Market Jn., Koonammavu.
- BTM College for Women's, Koonammavu.
- Chavara ITC., Koonammavu.
- Geek Institute of Fashion Technology, ITC Road, Koonammavu.
- Royal Institute of Medical Technology, Chithira Jn., Koonammavu.
- Tiny Tots Play School, Valavu, Valluvally, Koonammavu.

== Notable Places ==
- Adikulam Market
- Athani
- Chithira Junction
- Pianumkootam
- Chemmayam
- Edakkathod
- Kaduvamkulam
- Kavilnada
- Kochal
- Maloth
- Meisthiripady
- Millupady
- Nalaammile
- Pallikadavu
- Schoolpady
- Thoosham
- Painam koottam

== See also ==
- Edapally
- Ernakulam District
- Kochi
- Kottuvally
- North Paravur
- Paravur Taluk
- Alangad
- Varappuzha
- Cheranallur
