= Panayikulam =

- Village
- Location in Kerala, India Panayikulam (India)
- Coordinates: 10°6′0″N 76°18′0″E
- Country: India
- State: Kerala
- District: Ernakulam

Languages
  - Official: Malayalam, English
- Time zone: UTC+5:30 (IST)
- PIN: 683511
- Telephone code: 0484
- Vehicle registration: KL-41
- Nearest city: Kochi
- Literacy: 100%
- Lok Sabha constituency: Ernakulam

Panayikulam is a small village which is located inAlangad Grama Panchayat, Paravur Taluk, Kerala, India. It is around 7 km from the Aluva Railway Station, and 10 km from the Nedumbassery International Airport. It is a preferred residential locality due to its proximity to the industrial areas, such as; Binanipuram, Eloor and Kalamassery, where major factories like FACT, HMT, HIL, TCC, Binani, CMRL etc., are situated. The town is situated near the Periyar River. It is the birthplace of film director/actor Althaf Salim.

The people here mainly rely on agriculture. Panayikulam is well known for the cultivation of Snap Melon (Pottuvellari).

== Education ==
Government LP School, Little Flower High School, St. Benedict Nursery School, Alhuda School and Viswadeepti Vidyalaya are the institutions, the village depend for their primary education. After school students has accessibility to other educational institutions like Union Christian College, St. Xavier's College for Women, Cochin University of Science and Technology, MES College Marampally, St.Puls College etc.

== Religious spots ==
Little Flower Church, Panayikulam Juma Masjid, Salafi Masgid Panayikulam, Marayil Temple, Mahavishnu Temple, Al Huda Masjid, Panayikulam Central Masjid. Panaikulam is the nearest bus route to visit Kunnel Palli (Infant Jesus Church).

== Nearby places ==
- Kadungalloor
- Eloor
- Binanipuram
- Kalamassery
- Alangad
- Koonammavu
- Varapuzha
- Aluva Town

== Landmarks ==
- Dhanya Auditorium
- Little Flower Church
- PKM LFHS

== Bus routes ==
- Ernakulam- Kalamassery- Panayikulam-Koonammavu - North Paravur
- Aluva -Kadungallor-Panayikulam-Koonammavu-Varapuzha
- Koonammavu-Panayikulam-Kalamassery(Seaport-Airport Road)-Kakkanad
- North Paravur- Koonammavu- Panayikulam- Kalamassery HMT- Govt.Cochin Medical College, Kalamassery.

== Bus stops ==
- Karippuzha
- Narayanan Kada
- Nalam Mile
- Panayikulam
- Millu Padi
- Puthiya road
- Pallippady
- Chirayam ration kada
- Keeranpilly

== See also ==
- North Paravur
- Ernakulam District
