= Kedamangalam Sadanandan =

Indian Kadhaprasangam performer

- Born: 1926; Ezhikkara, North Paravur, Ernakulam District, India
- Died: 13 April 2008 (aged 82); Ezhikkara, North Paravur, Ernakulam District, India
- Occupations: Kadhaprasangam Artist, Actor, Screenwriter, Lyricist, poet
- Years active: 1944–2008
- Spouse: Ponnamma (m. 1988)
- Children: Jiji, Manoj
- Parent(s): Manayath Ayyappan and Parvathy
- Relatives: Karunakaran, Radhakrishnan (Brothers)

Kedamangalam Sadanandan (1926 – 13 April 2008) was a Kadhaprasangam artist, actor, screenwriter and lyricist from Kerala. He performed Kadhaprasangam (story telling) in more than 15,000 stages for over 50,000 hours in a career spanning about 64 years. He wrote scripts for 12 films, lyrics for more than hundred films and acted in about 40 films. He received the Kerala Sangeetha Nataka Akademi Fellowship in 1981.

== Biography ==
Kedamangalam Sadanandan was born in Paravur, Kerala, in December 1926. He debuted on stage as a monodramatist in 1944. During his early years, he performed famous poems including Changampuzha's Vazhakkula and Ramanan. Ramanan alone was performed in 3,476 stages. Another one was Unniarcha, the Ezhava dame who humbled the rapacious Jonaka gang with mastery over sword fight. Despite age related infirmities, he continued his vocation till his last years. He died on 13 April 2008 due to lung cancer.

Discography

1. Ramanan
2. Vazhakkula
3. Karuna
4. Ankakkalari
5. Pazhassi Raja
6. Unniyarcha
7. Thacholi Othenan
8. Guruvayoorappan
9. Karnan
10. Mahanaya AKG
11. Chiruthappennu
12. Swami Ayyappan
13. Sree Ayyappan
14. Bangladesh
15. Vyasante Chiri
16. Avan Veendum Jayililekku
17. Chirikkunna Manushyan
18. Rani
19. Agnipareeksha
20. Mahabharatham
21. Vaidehi
22. Ramayanam

== Filmography ==
1. Istam (2001)
2. Sreemurukan (1977)
3. Amba Ambika Ambalika (1976)
4. Hridayam Oru Kshethram (1976)
5. Thomasleeha (1975)
6. Swami Ayappan (1975)
7. Chandrakantham (1974)
8. Sree Guruvayoorappan (1972)
9. Sree Guruvayoorappan (1964)
10. Devalayam (1964)
11. Veluthampi Dawala (1962)
12. Viyarppinte Vila (1962)
13. Kandam Becha Kottu (1961) as Avuran
14. Umminithanka (1961)
15. Arappavan (1961) as Pachu Pilla
16. Thaskaraveeran (1957)
17. Marumakal (1952)
