= Ezhikkara =

- Village
- Location in Kerala, India Ezhikkara (India)
- Coordinates: 10°6′0″N 76°13′0″E
- Country: India
- State: Kerala
- District: Ernakulam

Government
  - Body: Ezhikkara Panchayath, Ezhikkara Village Office

Area
  - Total: 15.27 km^{2} (5.90 sq mi)

Population
  - Total: 17,201
  - Density: 1,126/km^{2} (2,920/sq mi)

Languages
  - Official: Malayalam, English
- Time zone: UTC+5:30 (IST)
- Telephone code: 0484
- Vehicle registration: KL-42
- Coastline: 0 kilometres (0 mi)
- Nearest city: North Paravur
- Sex ratio: 1036 ♂/♀
- Literacy: 92.34%
- Lok Sabha constituency: Ernakulam
- Civic agency: Ezhikkara Panchayat
- Climate: Tropical monsoon (Köppen)
- Avg. summer temperature: 35 °C (95 °F)
- Avg. winter temperature: 20 °C (68 °F)
- Website: [ lsgkerala.in/ezhikkarapanchayat]]

Ezhikkara is a Village in the North Paravur Taluk of Ernakulam District, Kerala. The North Paravur to Chathanad road (9 km) passes through this village. Ezhikkara is situated close to kochi city. Ezhikkara is famous for its Pokkali (a type of rice) fields, prawn farms and idyllic backwaters.

== Geography ==
Ezhikkara is a quintessential Kerala village surrounded by lagoons and lush vegetation. Fishing and rice farming are the main source of income for the residents. Ezhikkara is famous for its Pokkali rice cultivations and fresh water prawn farms. The neighboring areas are Veeran Puzha part of NW-3 (Kollam-Kottapuram); Vypin Island in west, Kottuvally in east; Kadamakkudy in south and North Paravur in north.

== Civic administration ==
Ezhikkara Panchayath is situated at Panchayathpadi bus stop. Ezhikkara panchayath belongs to North Paravur Taluk. Ezhikkara comes under Paravur Assembly constituency. Places or wards in this village include Chathanad, Kadakkara, Kedamangalam, Nanthiattukunam, Perumbadanna etc.

== Politics ==
Local government bodies include Ezhikkara Panchayath and Ezhikkara Village Office.

== Public institutions ==
- Govt Primary Health Centre, Ezhikkara
- Govt Higher Secondary School, Ezhikkara
- Govt Lower Primary School, Ezhikkara
- SN Arts and Science College, Kedamangalam, Ezhikkara
- St. Vincent Lower Primary School, Palliyakkal
- Community Health Center, Ezhikkara

== Public charitable institutions ==
- Asraya Bhavan - Home for mentally challenged persons, Ezhikkara

== Places of worship ==
- Chathanad Sree Bhuvanaswari Temple
- Chitteparambu Devi Temple
- Palliyakkal Sri Dharmasastha Temple
- Tharamel Sree Bhuvaneswari & Sree MahaVishnu Temple
- Ezhikkara Sree Dharmasastha Temple
- Vaniviharam Saraswathi Temple
- Neendoothara Sri Dharmashastha Temple
- St.Mary's Assumption Church, Ezhikkara
- St. Mary's Jacobite Syrian Chapel
- Arogyamatha Church, Kedamangalam
- Ezhikkara Mosque
- Kedamangalam Mosque
- Ezhikara Juma Masjid
- Perumpadanna Juma Masjid
- St. Vincent Feror Church, Chathanad (Latin)
- Infant Jesus church Kadakkara (Latin)
- Edathuruth Vallor Muthan Temple
- Edathuruth Vattathara Temple
- Vadakkekadakkara Puliyamppilly Temple
- Vattathara Sree Muthappan Bhagavathi Temple

== Tharavads ==
There are many prominent and old Tharavads (joint nair family ancestral homes) in Ezhikkara dating back to the early 18th century. These Tharavads are characterized by their Nalukettu and Ettukettu building architecture, large swaths of rice fields and coconut groves, Ambalam (place of worship), Sarpakkavu (revered serpent abodes), Kulams (natural clear water ponds), festivities, customs and traditions that are quintessentially Kerala. The Paraat taravad devi shetrum at Ezikkara

== Places of interest ==
- Gateway to Cherai
- Chathanad kadavu
- Pokkali fields
- Veeran puzha River

== See also ==
- Paravur Taluk
- Ernakulam District
