= Kunnukara =

- town
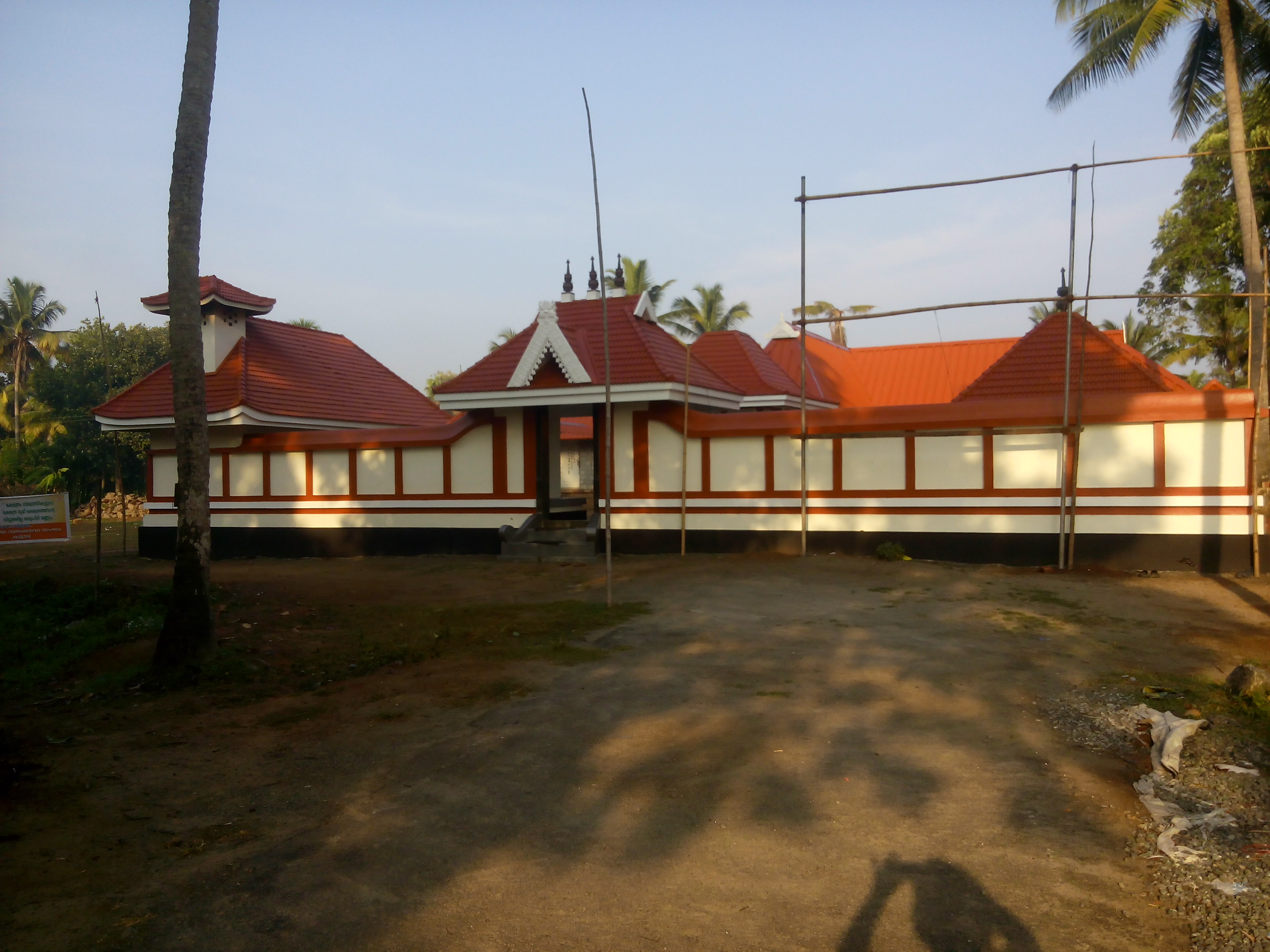
- Kootala Bhagavathy Temple
- Nickname: Land of hill
- Interactive map of Kunnukara
- Coordinates: 10°9′0″N 76°18′0″E
- Country: India
- State: Kerala
- District: Ernakulam
- City UA: Kochi

Government
  - Body: Kunnukara Panchayat North Paravur Taluk

Languages
  - Official: Malayalam, English
- Time zone: UTC+5:30 (IST)
- PIN: 683578
- Telephone code: 0484
- Vehicle registration: KL-42
- Nearest city: North Paravur
- Lok Sabha constituency: Ernakulam
- Civic agency: Kunnukara Panchayat
- Climate: moderate (Köppen)
- Website: www.kunnukara.webs.com

Kunnukara is a census town and panchayat in Paravur Taluk of Ernakulam district, Kerala, India. The village is situated on the airport road connecting North Paravur (NH66) and Nedumbassery (NH544). North Paravur is the nearest town, 7 km from this village. Aluva (10 km) and Angamaly (12 km) are also near Kunnukara. Its administrative headquarters is in Kunnukara Town itself. The Mini Civil Station has four hospitals and all the Govt. offices, among others.

== History ==
Kunnukara panchayat was once part of Ayroor village union in Alengad taluk. Later, Alengad merged with N. Paravur and Kunnukara became a panchayat. This place was then part of the Kingdom of Cochin. During the Mysorean invasion of Kerala, Tipu Sultan travelled through Manjaly via Kunnumkara.

== Geography ==
Kunnukara is surrounded by Periyar river to the south, Chalakudy river to the north and Manjaly Canal in its centre and to the west. Kunnukara is the part of the Kerala backwaters. The surrounding areas are Chengamand panchayat to the east, Thrissur district - Kuzhur panchayat to the North, Puthenvelikkara panchayat to the west and Karumallore panchayat to the south. Kunnukara is considered to be the rice grain of Paravur. The main source of income in the panchayat comes from agriculture, with different types of cultivations grown. Brick construction is a major industry as well.

== Civic administration ==
Kunnukara belongs to the Parakkadav block panchayat. The wards or places in Kunnukara include:

- Aduvassery
- Kuttipuzha
- Chalakka
- Ayroor
- Vayalkara
- Kuthiathode

== Nearest railway stations ==
- Aluva railway station
- Angamaly railway station
- Chowwara railway station

== Nearest airports ==
- Cochin International Airport

== See also ==
- Paravur Taluk
- Kochi
- Ernakulam District
