= Methala =

- town
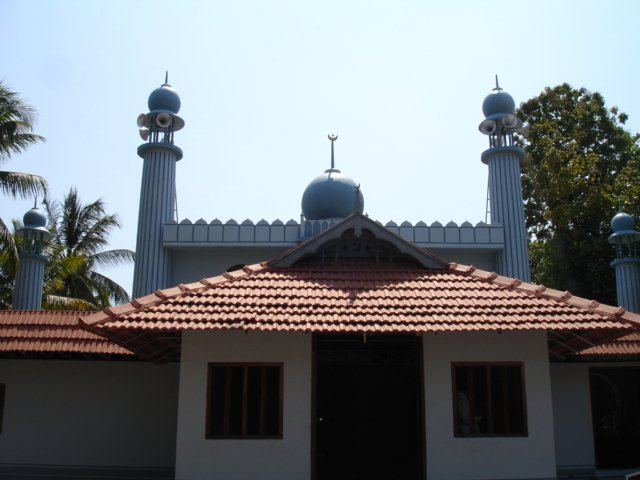
- Cheraman Juma Masjidh
- Interactive map of Methala
- Coordinates: 10.206°N 76.200°E
- Country: India
- State: Kerala
- District: Thrissur

Population (2001)
  - Total: 36,317

Languages
  - Official: Malayalam, English
- Time zone: UTC+5:30 (IST)

Methala is a census town in Thrissur district in the Indian state of Kerala. Methala was added to Kodungallur Municipality on 11 November 2009.

== Demographics ==
As of 2001 India census, Methala had a population of 36,317. Males constitute 48% of the population and females 52%. Methala has an average literacy rate of 86%, higher than the national average of 59.5%: male literacy is 88%, and female literacy is 84%. In Methala, 10% of the population is under 6 years of age.

== Transportation ==
Methala is well connected by road to all parts of kerala. National Highway 66 passes through this town. The four-lane Kodungallur bypass (Kottapuram- Chanthapura Bypass) passes through. Other major roads in this place are Kodungallur-Chalakudy Road (via Krishnankotta) and Kodungallur-Thuruthipuram road. The national waterway 3 ends at kottapuram in methala. There is a cargo terminal at kottapuram which has been built as a part of the waterway project.

== Places around Methala ==
- Kottapuram has one of the biggest vegetable markets in Kerala. It is located on the shores of Kodungallur lake. During AD 50's, Thomas the Apostle (The apostle of Christ) came here through Muziri port, near to Kottapuram Fort.

Methala is in Thrissur district, in the state of kerala.

Cheraman Juma Masjid is a mosque in Methala, Kodungallur Taluk. The Cheraman Masjid is said to be the very first mosque in India, built in 629 AD by Malik, son of Dinar. Cheraman Juma Masjid is the second oldest Mosque in the world.
