= Congregation of Mother of Carmel =

Religious institute

Congregation of the Mother of Carmel
- Suore della Madre del Carmelo
- Formation: February 13, 1866; 160 years ago
- Founder: Kuriakose Elias Chavara
- Founded at: Koonammavu, Kerala, India
- Type: Religious Institute of Consecrated Life
- Headquarters: Mount Carmel Road, Thaikkattukara P.O., Aluva 683106, Kerala, India
- Members: 7000

The Congregation of the Mother of Carmel (C.M.C.) is a Syro-Malabar holic centralized religious congregation founded by Kuriakose Elias Chavara on February 13 1866 at Koonammavu, Kochi, India.

== History ==
The congregation was founded as the Sisters of the Third Order of Carmelites Discalced by Kuriakose Elias Chavara, on 13 February 1866 at Koonammavu in the southern state of Kerala.

== Current ==
The congregation today is divided among 25 Provinces and six regions throughout India and Africa. They also serve in Germany, Italy, Nepal, Peru, Canada, Iraq, UK and the United States.

== Saints of the congregation ==
Elias Chavara, founder of the community was beatified by Pope John Paul II in 1986, along with Alphonsa of the Immaculate Conception in the course of his visit to India. One of the congregation's early members, Euphrasia of the Sacred Heart of Jesus, was beatified by Pope Benedict XVI in 2006. Chavara and Euphrasia were canonised by Pope Francis on 24 November 2014.
