= Maliankara =

- Village
- Country: India
- State: Kerala
- District: Ernakulam

Languages
  - Official: Malayalam, English
- Time zone: UTC+5:30 (IST)
- PIN: 683516
- Telephone code: 0484
- Vehicle registration: KL-42
- Nearest city: North Paravur
- Lok Sabha constituency: Ernakulam

Maliankara (Malayalam: "മാലിയാങ്കര"). is a village in Paravur Taluk, Ernakulam district of Kerala. It is located near Moothakunnam. It is also a boat ride away from Munambam and accessible by bridge to Pallipuram of Vypin island. Along with Munambam it forms the north-west corner of Ernakulam district where the Periyar River ends in the Arabian Sea. It is located west of Kottuvallikadu and east of Pallipuram.Towards the north it is separated by Periyar river to Azhicode which is in Trissur district.

According to tradition, Maliankara is recognized as the landing site of St. Thomas the Apostle upon his arrival in India in AD 52. This event marked the beginning of his missionary journey in the region, which eventually fostered the establishment of the Malankara Nasrani community. The geographical designation Malankara, historically used to describe the native region and heritage of the Nasrani community, is widely believed by scholars and local historians to be derived from the name "Maliankara".

Some notable institutions in Maliankara are St Anthony's church, SNM college, SNM Engineering college.

== See also ==
- North Paravur
- Ernakulam District
