= Gothuruth =

- Village
- Location in Kerala, India
- Coordinates: 10.186159°N 76.201279°E
- Country: India
- State: Kerala
- District: Ernakulam

Government
  - Body: Chendamangalam Panchayat

Population
  - Total: 9,200

Languages
  - Official: Malayalam, English
- Time zone: UTC+5:30 (IST)
- Telephone code: 0484
- Vehicle registration: KL-42
- Lok Sabha constituency: Ernakulam
- Civic agency: Chendamangalam Panchayat
- Website: www.mygothuruth.com

== Geography ==
Gothuruth is a village in the Ernakulam district of Kerala, India. It is situated on an island in the Periyar River, approximately 20 km from the city of Kochi and 5 km from the town of North Paravur. The Cochin International Airport at Nedumbassery is about 23 km away. The island spans an area of roughly 2,000 acres.

== Origin ==
The origin of the name "Gothuruth" has several interpretations according to local history. One prominent belief is that the island is named after a king known as Kon. Due to its proximity to both the king's domain and the nearby Kottapuram Palace, the island was originally called Konthuruth, which eventually became Gothuruth. Another held belief relates to the Paliath Achan, the hereditary prime ministers of the Kingdom of Cochin. Historically, the island served as grazing land for cattle belonging to the Paliath Achan, and the name is thought to derive from this association.

== Historical Context ==
=== Muziris ===
Gothuruth is historical tied to the ancient port of Muziris, one of the most prominent trading hubs of the ancient world, known for its spice trade with the Roman Empire, Egypt, and Mesopotamia. Located on the banks of the Periyar River, the island lies within a region that was transformed by a catastrophic flood in 1341 CE. This event reshaped the coastal geography, leading to the silting of Muziris and the formation of new landmasses, including Gothuruth. Once used as grazing land for cattle owned by the Paliath Achan family, the island reflects post-Muziris land use patterns after the port's decline. Today, the village is included in the Kerala Muziris Heritage Project, a government initiative that links coastal heritage sites from Kodungallur to Kochi through curated boat routes and historical preservation efforts. With over 600 years of recorded history across 4.5 square kilometers, Gothuruth witnessed the Periyar River's role in the spice trade legacy of Muziris before the port's silting and flooding.

== Demographics ==
The population is predominantly Latin Catholic, a reflection of the island's history of Portuguese missionary activity in the 16th century. Small minorities of Syrian Christians, Hindus, and Muslims also reside in the village, contributing to the region's tradition of religious harmony.

== Economy ==
The traditional livelihoods in Gothuruth are fishing and coconut farming. Local fishermen use traditional plank-built boats to navigate the Periyar River, targeting sardines, prawns, and mackerel. The island's fertile soil supports extensive coconut cultivation, which in turn feeds a coir (rope and mat) production industry that provides employment to many families. Historically, sand mining from the Periyar River was also a source of income, though this has been curtailed due to environmental regulations. In recent years, heritage tourism related to Chavittu Nadakam has emerged as a growing source of revenue for the village.

== Culture ==
=== Chavittu Nadakam ===
Gothuruth is recognized as the fountainhead of Chavittu Nadakam (literally "stamping dance"), a five-centuries-old Christian art form that evolved from a fusion of Kerala's performance traditions and Portuguese theatrical elements introduced by missionaries in the 16th century.

Portuguese influence

Following Vasco da Gama's arrival in 1498, Portuguese missionaries sought to evangelize coastal Latin Christian communities. Displeased with the local population's affinity for Kathakali and its Hindu mythological themes, they introduced Jesuit plays, Portuguese opera styles, and European religious drama. These influences merged with indigenous Kalaripayattu footwork and Kathakali hand gestures, creating a unique hybrid form that used Biblical stories and the lives of saints as its primary subject matter. The art form developed as a tool for evangelism, with missionaries fusing European theatrical traditions with local performance practices.

Characteristics of Chavittu Nadakam

Portuguese elements shaped the visual aspects of the art form. Costumes feature brocade fabrics, Greco-Roman style headgear, crowns, and vibrant makeup that evoke medieval European opera, while dialogue is presented in a mix of Malayalam and Tamil.The art form emphasizes rhythmic, exaggerated footwork performed on a wooden stage. Performances blend vocals, drums, and foot-stomping. The first and most celebrated play is Karalsman, written by the 16th-century poet Chinnathampi Annavi, which recounts the heroic deeds of the French emperor Charlemagne against the Emperor of Jerusalem.

Evolution and revival

Traditionally, Chavittu Nadakam was performed over 10 to 15 days to present a single story. In modern times, performances have been shortened to fewer than three hours, and live music has sometimes been replaced by recorded accompaniment. In Gothuruth, performers have traditionally come from the local fishing community and other laboring classes, for whom Chavittu Nadakam is not merely a livelihood but an integral part of their cultural identity.

The art form faced a period of decline in the late 20th century but emerged from near oblivion when the Government of Kerala established the Kerala Chavittu Nataka Academy (KCNA) in Gothuruth in 2005. The art form gained further prominence through its inclusion in the Kochi-Muziris Biennale in 2012, which attracted international attention. Today, tourists can request performances on demand at the Gothuruthu Chavittu Natakam Performance Centre. Community efforts continue to sustain the art form among the laboring classes, with troupe members touring India and abroad, blending tradition with new stories such as Sabarimala Sreedharmasastha. In a notable development, some troupes have begun performing stories based on Hindu mythology, such as the legend of Lord Ayyappa, giving the art form a secular dimension.

Training system

Training to become a Chavittu Nadakam performer follows the traditional Gurukula system in a kalari (training school), demanding one and a half to two years of rigorous, immersive practice under a master called Asan or Annavi. Aspiring artists, often from Gothuruth's fishing community, undergo physical conditioning via oil massages (meyyuzhichil) for flexibility, alongside weapons training with sticks, swords, and spears inspired by Kalaripayattu martial arts. Core skills include six months of mastering basic to complex chuvadu (stamping steps) synced with music from chenda, maddalam, and ilathalam drums. Training also covers mudras (hand gestures), eye expressions, and acting, with actors memorizing full librettos in Malayalam-Tamil. Singers perform their own vocal parts, and training includes fencing and dynamic poses for dramatic effect. Practice begins with rituals such as lighting a lamp, offering dakshina to the Asan, and bowing to the chuvadi (drama book) in a vazhangal ceremony. After their kalari debut, performers graduate to stages. Modern academies such as the Kerala Chavittu Nataka Academy in Gothuruth train youth from age ten through school programs.

== Traditions ==
Gothuruth hosts an annual boat race (Vallamkali) usually held in September, featuring Chundan Vallom (snake boats) and Iruttukuthy Vallom. The race is organized under the auspices of the St. Sebastian's Church. The island also hosts an annual Chavittu Nadakam festival known as "Chuvadi".

== See also ==
- Paravur Taluk
- Ernakulam
- Ernakulam District
- Kochi
