= Pathalam =

- Town
- Location in Kerala, India Pathalam (India)
- Coordinates: 10°4′0″N 76°18′0″E
- Country: India
- State: Kerala
- District: Ernakulam

Languages
  - Official: Malayalam, English
- Time zone: UTC+5:30 (IST)
- Telephone code: 0484
- Vehicle registration: KL-42
- Coastline: 0 kilometres (0 mi)
- Lok Sabha constituency: Ernakulam
- Climate: Tropical monsoon (Köppen)
- Avg. summer temperature: 35 °C (95 °F)
- Avg. winter temperature: 20 °C (68 °F)

Pathalam is a suburban region of the city of Kochi, in the state of Kerala, India. It is situated in Eloor, an industrial district of Kochi. In the state bureaucratic administration, Pathalam is part of the Paravur Taluk in the District of Ernakulam. Pathalam Junction is a four-way junction having access to places like Kalamassery NH47 (2 km away), N.Paravur (14 km away). There is an ESI hospital in Pathalam.

== Etymology ==
In mythology, Pathalam means abyss of Asuras.

== See also ==
- North Paravur
- Ernakulam District
