= Kochi metropolitan area =

Most populous metropolitan area in Kerala

Kochi Metropolitan Area
- Urban
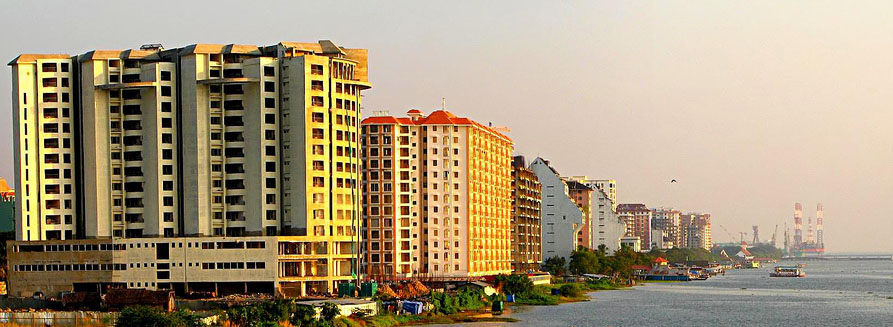
- Marine Drive, as seen from the Vembanad Lake
- Country: India
- State: Kerala
- District: Ernakulam
- Core city: Kochi

Area
  - Total: 843.84 km^{2} (325.81 sq mi)

Population (2011)
  - Total: 2,119,724
  - Density: 2,512.0/km^{2} (6,506.0/sq mi)

Languages
  - Official: Malayalam
- Time zone: UTC+5:30 (IST)
- Telephone code: 0484
- Vehicle registration: KL-7, KL-39, KL-40, KL-41, KL-42, KL-43, KL-63

Kochi metropolitan area or Greater Cochin is a metropolitan area in the Ernakulam district of Kerala, India, comprising the Kochi Municipal Corporation, nine adjacent municipal councils, 15 gram panchayats and parts of four gram panchayats. With a population of more than 2.1 million within an area of 843 km^{2}, it is the most populous metropolitan area in Kerala.

== Constituents of the urban agglomeration ==
Urban units included in the Kochi urban agglomeration (as per 2011 Census)
Sl. No	Name	Category
1	Kochi	Municipal Corporation
2	Aluva	Municipality
3	Thrippunithura	Municipality
4	Maradu	Municipality
5	Thrikkakara	Municipality
6	Kalamassery	Municipality
7	Eloor	Municipality
8	North Paravur	Municipality
9	Perumbavoor	Municipality
10	Angamali	Municipality
11	Chengamanad	Census Town
12	Nedumbassery	Census Town
13	Cheranelloor	Census Town
14	Varapuzha	Census Town
15	Chennamangalam	Census Town
16	Kadamakkudy	Census Town
17	Mulavukad	Census Town
18	Kadungalloor	Census Town
19	Alengad	Census Town
20	Chottanikkara	Census Town
21	Choornikkara	Census Town
22	Edathala	Census Town
23	Kizhakkambalam	Census Town
24	Kumbalam	Census Town
25	Kottuvally	Census Town
26	Vypin Island	Census Town

Census town: As per Census of India definition;

A census town is a village that meets certain urban criteria: it has a population of at least 5,000, a population density of 400 persons per sq. km or more, and at least 75% of its male working population is engaged in non-agricultural activities. Unlike statutory towns, census towns are administered by gram panchayats rather than municipalities/statutory bodies.

== History ==
Kochi urban agglomeration population over the years
Year	Pop.	±%
1981	824,900	—
1991	1,140,600	+38.3%
2001	1,536,400	+34.7%
2011	2,117,990	+37.9%
Source: Census of India

The concept of "urban agglomeration" in India was introduced by the Census of India in 1981. At that time, nine urban agglomerations were identified in Kerala, which increased to 19 in 2011 census. As per the 2001 census, Kochi urban agglomeration is the only urban agglomeration with a population exceeding one million.

The Kochi urban agglomeration constituted based on the 2001 census comprised Kochi Municipal Corporation, five municipal councils, 15 gram panchayats and parts of three gram panchayats. The five municipal councils were Tripunithura, Kalamassery, North Paravur, Aluva and Angamaly. The 15 panchayats were Thrikkakkara, Cheranelloor, Eloor, Varapuzha, Chennamangalam, Kadamakkudy, Mulavukad, Thiruvankulam, Maradu, Kadungalloor, Alangad, Chengamanad, Choornikkara, Edathala and Kottuvally. The population increased to 2,117,990 per 2011 census. As per the 2011 census, Ernakulam district had two urban agglomerations—Kochi urban agglomeration and Kothamangalam urban agglomeration.

== Economy ==
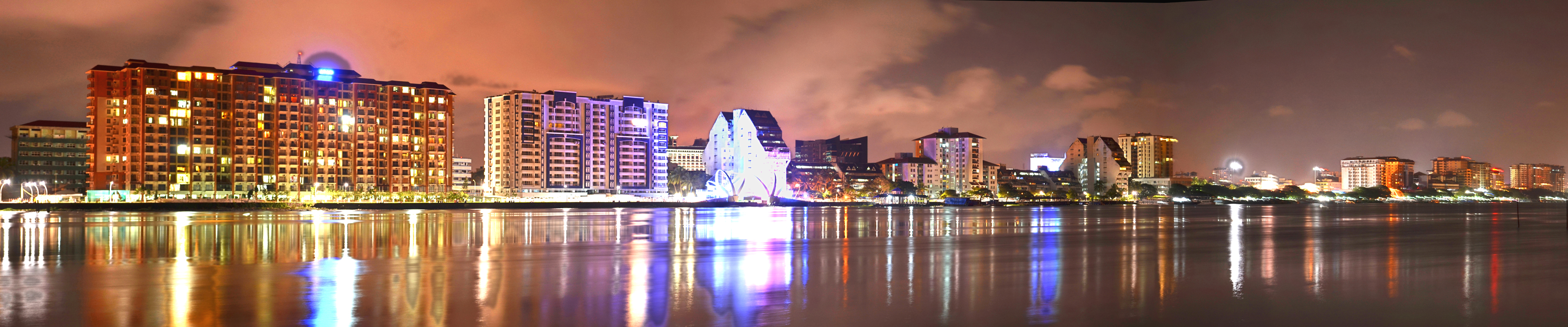
A night view of Marine Drive, Kochi

Kochi is known as the financial and economic capital of Kerala.

The economic growth gathered momentum after economic reforms in India introduced by the central government in the mid-1990s. Since 2000, the service sector has energized the economy. Over the years, the city has witnessed rapid commercialisation, and has today grown into the commercial capital of Kerala.

== See also ==
- Kochi Municipal Corporation
