= Koottukad =

- Village
- Location in Kerala, India Koottukad (India)
- Coordinates: 10°10′0″N 76°13′0″E
- Country: India
- State: Kerala
- District: Ernakulam

Languages
  - Official: Malayalam, English
- Time zone: UTC+5:30 (IST)
- Telephone code: 0484
- Vehicle registration: KL-42
- Nearest city: North Paravur
- Lok Sabha constituency: Ernakulam

Koottukad is a small village in Parur Taluk, Ernakulam district of Kerala state, South India.

== See also ==
- North Paravur
- Paravur Taluk
- Ernakulam District
- Kochi
