= Kunjithai =

Village in Kerala, India

Kunjithai (meaning "small coconut tree" in Malayalam) is a small village in Paravur Taluk, Ernakulam district in the state of Kerala, India. It is about 26 km from Ernakulam City. It is a lakeside village with the Pallipuram Lake as its western boundary. The ancient port town Muziris (Pattanam) shares its boundary with Kunjithai.As there is three religions mostly seen in this village the most among them would be Hindus and Christians, and both the people of religions accept each other and celebrate the temple festivals and church programs together, without any difference.
