= Karumalloor =

- Village
- Interactive map of Karumalloor
- Coordinates: 10.095440°N 76.320380°E
- Country: India
- State: Kerala
- District: Ernakulam

Government
  - Body: Panchyath Office & Village Office & Police Station

Area
  - Total: 21.05 km^{2} (8.13 sq mi)

Population (2011)
  - Total: 29,805
  - Density: 1,398/km^{2} (3,620/sq mi)

Languages
  - Official: Malayalam, English
- Time zone: UTC+5:30 (IST)
- Telephone code: 0484
- Vehicle registration: KL-42
- Nearest city: East Aluva Municipality and West North Paravur Municipality
- Literacy: 89.15%
- Lok Sabha constituency: Ernakulam
- Vidhan Sabha constituency: Kalamassery
- Civic agency: Karumallur
- Website: lsgkerala.in/karumallurpanchayat

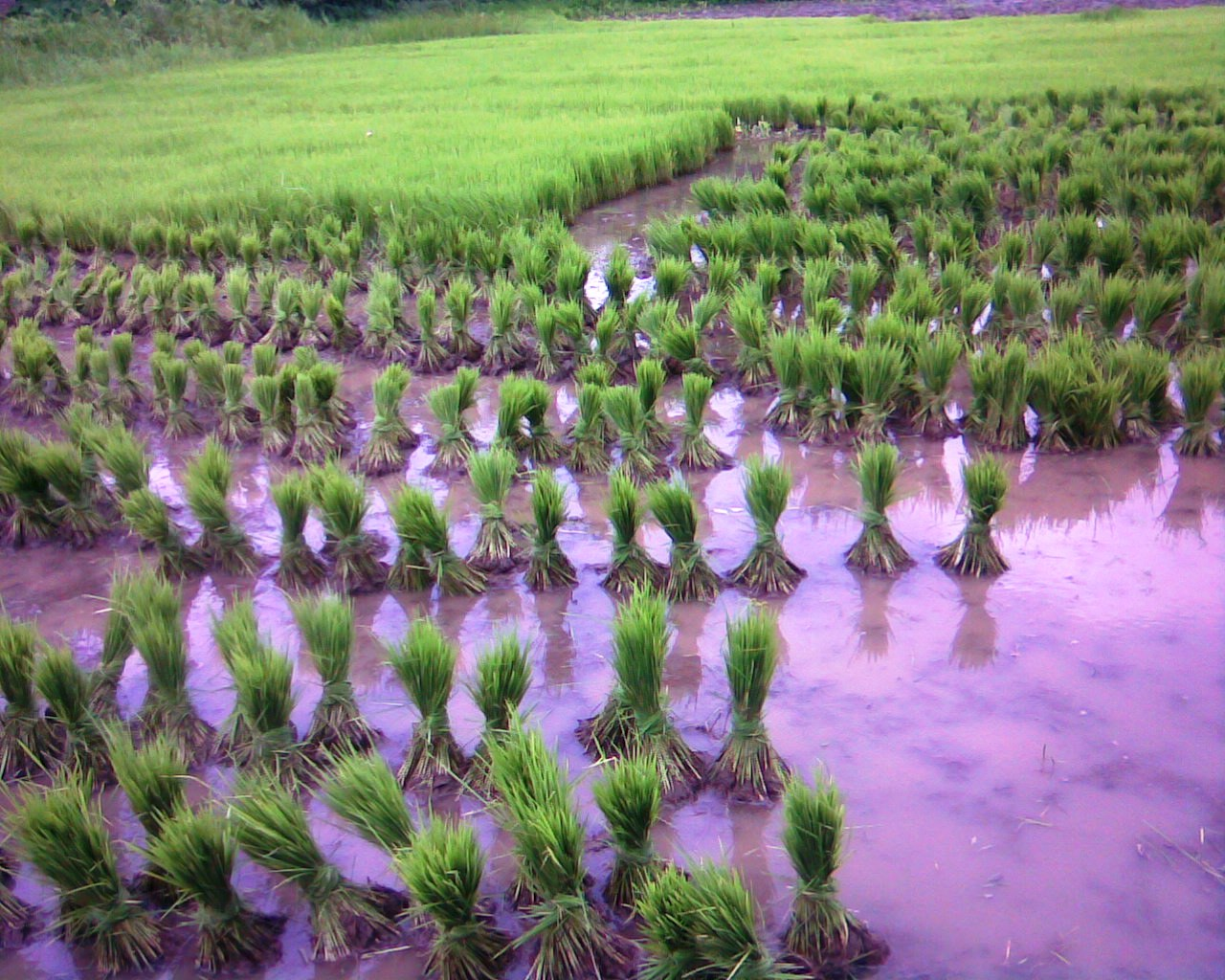
Purple paddy field

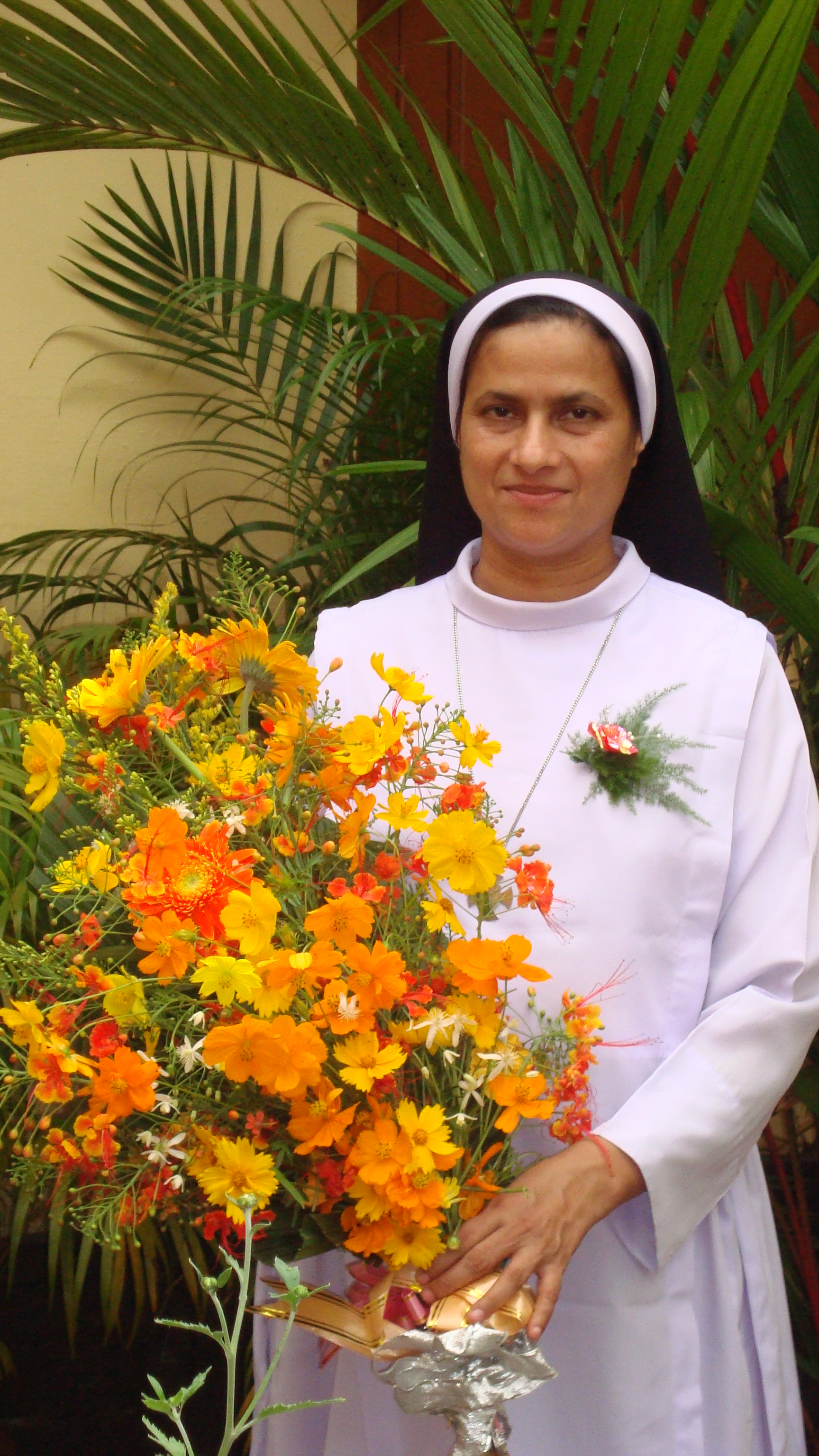
Little Teresas School

Karumallur is a village in Paravur Taluk, Ernakulam district in the Indian state of Kerala. Karumalloor is a panchayat in Ernakulam District. The village consists of large tracts of paddy fields. Karumallur is bounded by distributaries of the river Periyar.

== Demographics ==
As of 2011 India census, Karumalloor had a population of 29805 with 14452 males and 15353 females.

== Educational organizations ==
- Union Christian College, Aluva

== See also ==
- North Paravur
- Paravur Taluk
- Ernakulam District
- Kochi
