= Elenthikara =

Village in Ernakulam District, Kerala, India

Elenthikara is a small village in Puthenvelikara Panchayath, Paravur Taluk, Ernakulam district, Kerala, India. The Chalakudy River merges with the Periyar River at Elenthikara. The village is situated in the road connecting Paravur with Mala, Thrissur. The nearest town is North Paravur.Early inhabitants of this place worshipped "Ilaya Nandhi" or "Ilaya Bhagavathy".So this place was known as Elenthikara.

== Elenthikara High School ==
Elenthikara High School, near North Paravur, has a history. When Sree Narayana Guru visited this place he exhorted the people on the need for education and educational institutions. Inspired by his words Dr. C. S. Sankaran, a homeopath, built a school on his ancestral property in 1948. He later upgraded it into a high school in 1952. When there was a need for a proper playground the area around was cleared. Today this school and its playground houses precious historical evidence of a lost culture. Elenthikara was a place where Tippu Sultan visited on war time and hoisted a flag in a hill. That place is now known as "Kodi Kuthiya Kunnu"
