= Valluvalli =

Village in Kerala, India

Coordinates: 10°07′05″N 76°15′23″E

Valluvalli is a village in Kottuvalli panchayat in Ernakulam district in the Indian state of Kerala. It is located 3 km south of Paravur town. Valluvalli is located near Kodungallur, the ancient capital of Kerala. Valluvalli is located at a distance of about 15 km from Kodungallur.

The author of 14th century koka sandesham has stated about Valluvalli. There is a rustic beautiful poetic description of Valluvalli. After visiting Kuralkannar, a Buddhist monk at the Paravur Peruvaram Temple, head straight to the south and see the view from both sides of the road. Many gold coins of the Roman emperors Latius Caesar (2 AD), Nero (54-68 AD), Vespasian (69-79 AD), and Domitian (91-96 AD) Trojan (98-117 AD), Hadrian (117–138) Antoninus (138-161 AD) and Arolius (161-180 AD) have been excavated from Valluvalli. From this it can be inferred that Valluvalli was a prominent ancient trading center. These are now part of a study by the Department of Archeology.
