= Chowwara railway station =

Railway station in Kerala, India

Chowwara Kondotty

General information
- Location: Ernakulam district, Kerala; India
- Coordinates: 10.1330°N 76.3722°E
- Elevation: 11 m (36 ft)
- Owner: government
- Operator: Southern Railway zone, Thiruvananthapuram railway division
- Platforms: 2
- Tracks: 2

Construction
- Parking: Yes
- Cycle facilities: Yes
- Accessible: Yes

Other information
- Station code: 683571
Location
- Location within India Location within Kerala

Chowwara railway station, sometimes spelled as Chovvara, is a Southern Railway station serving Chowwara in Ernakulam district, Kerala, India. The station code is CWR.

It lies between the Angamaly and Aluva stations. The development of a road as part of the Seaport-Airport Road project that covers a 25.7 km stretch from Irumpanam to the Kochi airport also goes through the Chovvara station. The road will also help the commuters using the station.

This station has two platforms, and passenger trains halt here.

The station's elevation is 11 m (36 ft) above sea level. It is in the Southern Railway zone's Thiruvananthapuram railway division (Trivandrum).

Passenger trains that halt at Chowwara include:

- 56361 Shoranur Jn–Ernakulam Jn Passenger (unreserved)
- 56370 Ernakulam–Guruvayur Passenger (unreserved)
- 56365 Guruvayur–Punalur Fast Passenger (unreserved)
- 56362 Ernakulam–Nilambur Road Passenger (unreserved)
- 56371 Guruvayur–Ernakulam Passenger (unreserved)
- 06732 Piravom Road–Angamaly Special
- 06733 Angamaly–Ernakulam Jn Special
- 66611 Palakkad Jn–Ernakulam Jn MEMU
- 06735 Angamali–Ernakulam Special
- 56375 Guruvayur–Ernakulam Passenger (unreserved)
- 66612 Ernakulam Jn–Palakkad Jn MEMU
- 06736 Ernakulam–Angamaly Special
- 06737 Angamaly–Piravam Road Special
- 56364 Ernakulam Jn–Shoranur Jn Passenger (unreserved)
- 56363 Nilambur Road–Ernakulam Passenger (unreserved)
- 56376 Ernakulam–Guruvayur Passenger (unreserved)
- 56366 Punalur–Guruvayur Fast Passenger (unreserved)
