= Pokkali Rice =

Rice variety

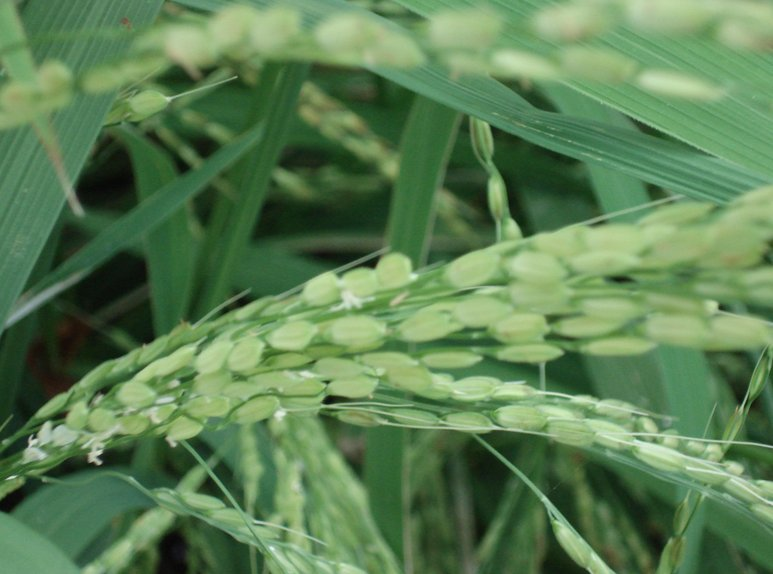
Grains of Pokkali Rice on the stalk

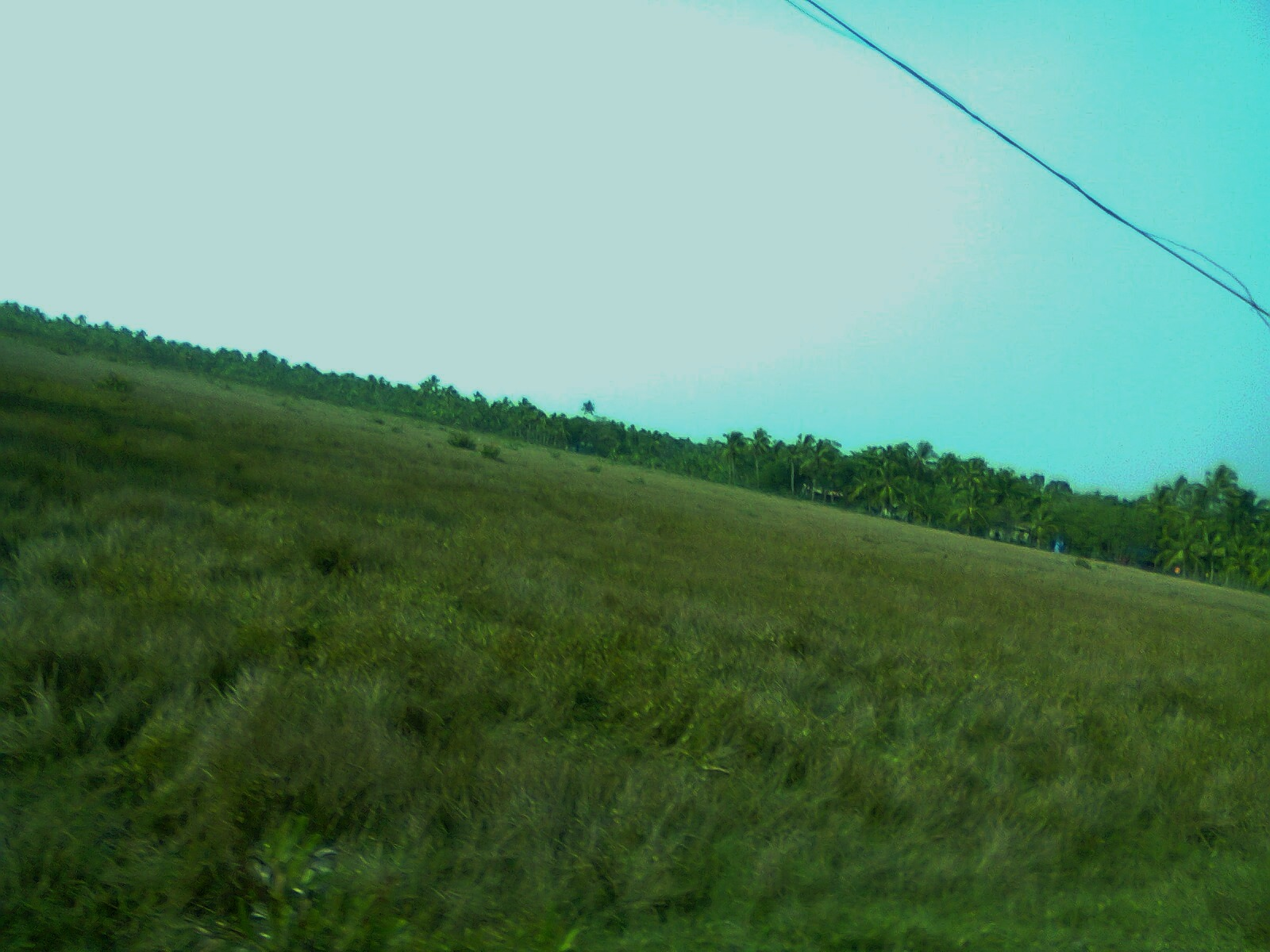
Vechoor Pokkali padam, (rice fields)Vaikkom, Kerala, India

Pokkali is a unique saline tolerant rice variety that is cultivated using extensive aquaculture in an organic way in the water-logged coastal regions, spread in about 5000 hectares area in Alappuzha, Kottayam, Thrissur and Ernakulam districts of Kerala in Southern India. The brand Pokkali has received a GI tag from the Geographical Indications Registry Office, Chennai.

Its resistance to salinity is remarkable. The rice is cultivated from June to early November when the salinity level of the water in the fields is low. From mid-November to mid-April, when the salinity is high, prawn farming takes over. The prawn seedlings, which swim in from the sea and the backwaters after the rice harvest, feed on the leftovers of the harvested crop. Sluice gates are used to control the water flow to the fields. The rice crop, which gets no other fertilizer or manure, draw nutrients from the prawns’ excrement and other remnants.

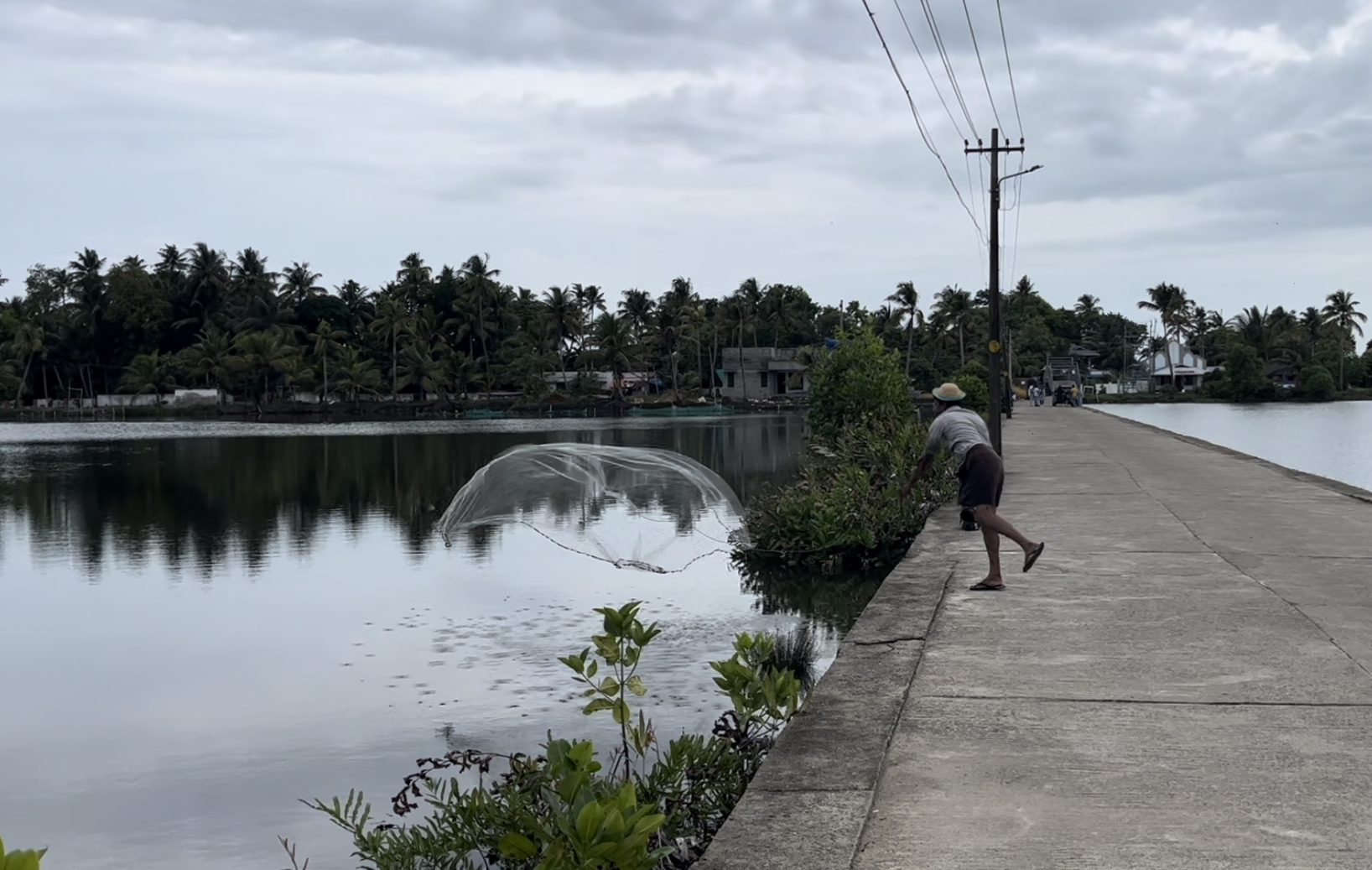
Fisherman casting net at Pokkali farm in Kadamakkudy Islands in Kochi

The seedlings just grow the natural way. In order to survive in the water-logged field, the rice plants grow up to 130-140 cm. But, as they mature, they bend over and collapse with only the panicles standing upright. Harvesting takes place by end-October. Only the panicles are cut about 30 cm from top and the rest of the stalks are left to decay in the water, which in time become feed for the prawns that start arriving in November–December. Then, the second phase of the Pokkali farming, the prawn filtration, begins.

The organically-grown Pokkali is famed for its peculiar taste and its high protein content. Farmers claim that the rice—its grains are extra large—has several medicinal properties. In the past, Pokkali provided the energy to fishermen to stay at sea all day. Even a DNA library has been developed by the University of Arizona, USA, for the rice.

Although farmers in Kerala had preferred more lucrative rice varieties over this traditional rice variety, in recent years Pokkali has regained some popularity due to its climate-change resistant features. As the crop grows up to two meters in height, it is relatively resistant to flooding, while the salinity-resistance of the crop makes Pokkali cultivation an effective defence against sea erosion.

== See also ==
- List of rice varieties
