= Kodungallur bypass =

Road in India

Route information
- Maintained by National Highways Authority of India
- Length: 3.58 km (2.22 mi)
- Existed: 2014–present

Major junctions
- From: Chanthapura
- To: Kottapuram

Location
- Country: India
- Major cities: Kodungallur

Highway system
- Roads in India; Expressways; National; State; Asian

The Kodungallur bypass is a 3.55-kilometre (2.21 mi) stretch road which bypasses the Indian city of Kodungallur. It is a part of National Highway 66. The total cost of the land acquisition and construction of the bypass is 1,168 million rupees.

== History ==
The first survey for the bypass was commissioned in 1977. In July 2008, notification was issued for acquisition of the land and, on 30 November 2008, land acquisitions were started. Resident associations and other families approached the lower court and Kerala High Court to stop the acquisitions by the National Highway Authority and Government of Kerala. On 30 May 2013, the government gave the total land to build the bypass. On 18 September 2014, Kerala's chief minister, Oommen Chandy, inaugurated the bypass.
