= Chathedom =

Chathedom Chathedom Thuruthipuram
- village
- Location in Kerala, India Chathedom (India)
- Coordinates: 10°11′30″N 76°13′0″E
- Country: India
- State: Kerala
- District: Ernakulam

Languages
  - Official: Malayalam, English
- Time zone: UTC+5:30 (IST)
- PIN: 680667
- Telephone code: 91 484
- Vehicle registration: KL - 42
- Nearest city: North Paravur
- Lok Sabha constituency: Ernakulam

Chathedom is a village in Ernakulam district in Kerala, India.
