= Chowwara =

Chowara
- village
- Location in Kerala, India Chowara (India)
- Coordinates: 10.129°N 76.373°E
- Country: India
- State: Kerala
- District: Ernakulam

Population (2001)
  - Total: 13,603

Languages
  - Official: Malayalam, English
- Time zone: UTC+5:30 (IST)
- Postal code: 683571
- Vehicle registration: KL 41

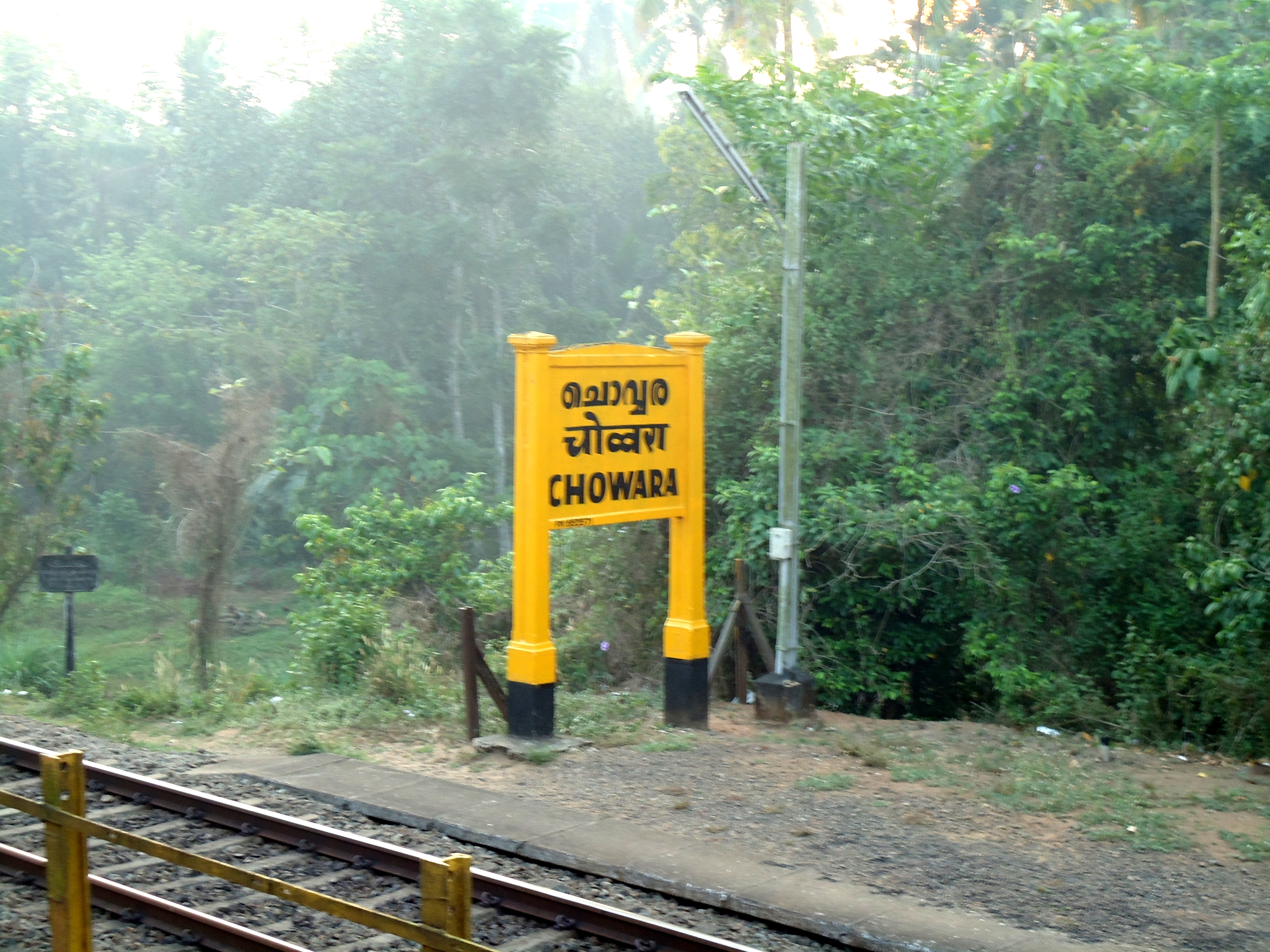
Chowara Railway Station

Chowara is a small town near Aluva in the Ernakulam district in the state of Kerala, India.

== Demographics ==
At the 2001 India census, Chowwara had a population of 13,603. Males constituted 50% of the population and females 50%. Chowwara had an average literacy rate of 79%, higher than the national average of 59.5%: male literacy was 81% and, female literacy was 76%. In Chowwara, 10% of the population was under 6 years of age.

Chowara is a village part of the Sreemoolanagaram Panchayat in Aluva Taluq of the Ernakulam district in Kerala, India. Located on the River Periyar, Cochin International Airport Limited – CIAL at Nedumbassery, is 6.3 km away from Chowara. It's accessibility through Rail (Chowara Railway Station), Air (CIAL Airport) and Water (Chowara Ferry).

== Politics ==
Chowara is part of the Chalakudy Lok Sabha constituency and the Aluva Assembly constituency.

== Travel ==
Chowara is well connected by air, road and rail from all parts of the State.

=== By Air ===
Cochin International Airport is just 6.3 km from the town center. Regular domestic and international connections are available from the airport.

=== By Train ===
Chowara railway station (IR Code: CWR) in the town, The Chowara Railway Station is close to Aluva Railway Station, a major railway station in Kerala

=== By Bus ===
Mainly private buses are here. KSRTC buses servicing from Aluva to Angamaly, Kalady Via Chowara-Mahilalayam bridge.

=== By Bridge ===
From Aluva around 3 km towards perumbavoor transport route Mahilalayam -thuruth bridge is the easiest way to access chowara.

=== By car ===
Taxis – Taxis and Uber are available

Rented Vehicles – There are many places where you can rent Cars and Bikes.
