= Thuruthipuram =

- Village
- Interactive map of Thuruthipuram
- Coordinates: 10°11′35″N 76°13′25″E
- Country: India
- State: Kerala
- District: Ernakulam

Languages
  - Official: Malayalam, English
- Time zone: UTC+5:30 (IST)
- PIN: 680667
- Telephone code: +91484XXXXXXX
- Vehicle registration: KL-42
- Nearest city: North Paravur
- Lok Sabha constituency: Ernakulam

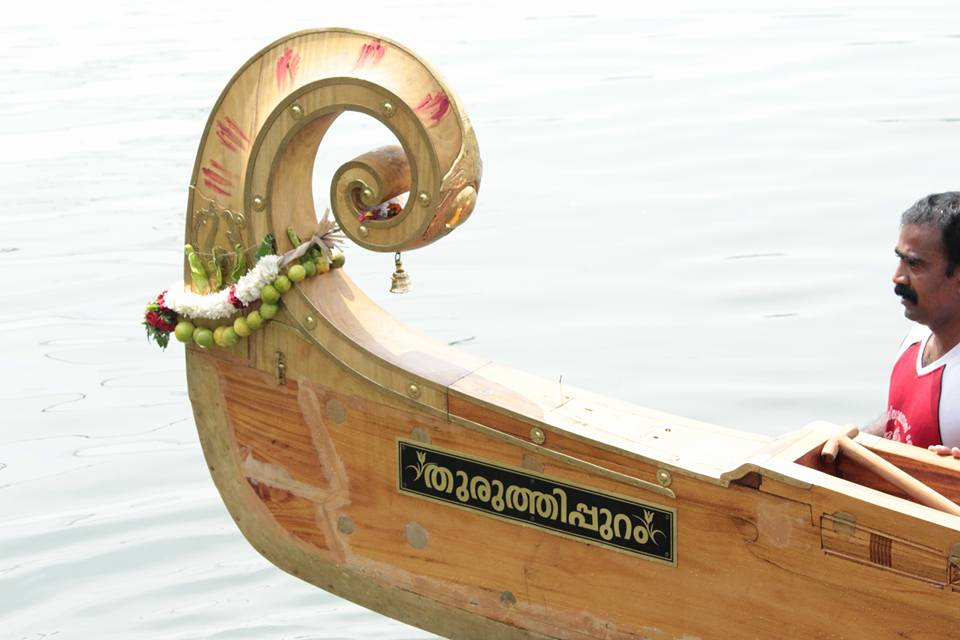
Thuruthippuram - Iruttukuthi boat(also known as Odi)

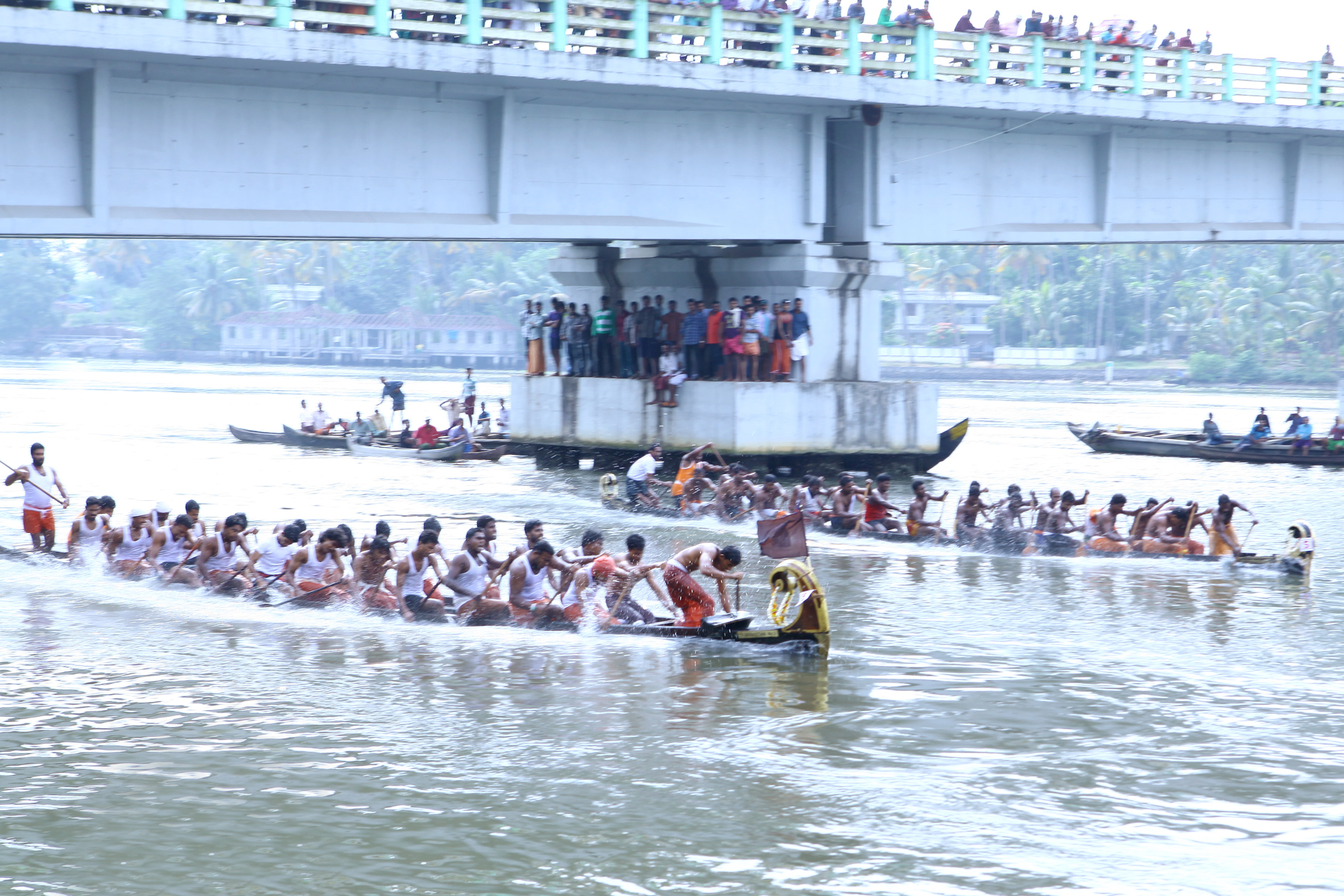
Iruttukuthi B grade final of TBR 2013

Thuruthipuram, also known as Chathedom Thuruthipuram, is a village on the borders of Ernakulam district and Thrissur in Paravur Taluk, Kerala, India. Situated on the Periyar River, the rainy season can prove challenging for residents, with occasional flooding of lower-lying areas. Fishing provides an important source of income for many villagers.

The village is inhabited by people of different religions, mainly Hindus and Christians. The church name is St. Francis Assisi church which is a Latin Catholic church and forms part of the Kottapuram Diocese. According to the historical books, Thuruthipuram was the native of the first Roman Catholic group of the Archdiocese of Verapoly. The temple's name is Muruka-Valli-Devasena temple. The place contains schools, a college and a hospital which are controlled by the church. There is a post office (Pin Code: 680667). AAJM Hospital is one of the oldest hospitals in this area which was initially run by foreign missionaries.

Thuruthipuram is well known for its boat races and Chavittu nadakam. The famous "Thuruthippuram Boat Race" is conducted in the Thuruthipuram river. This boat race is one of the oldest boat races in central Kerala. In 2016, a group of people from this place built a "Iruttukuthi"(also known as "OOdi") boat and named it "Thuruthippuram". This is the first B grade Iruttukuthi boat in kerala with a village's name.

== Culture ==
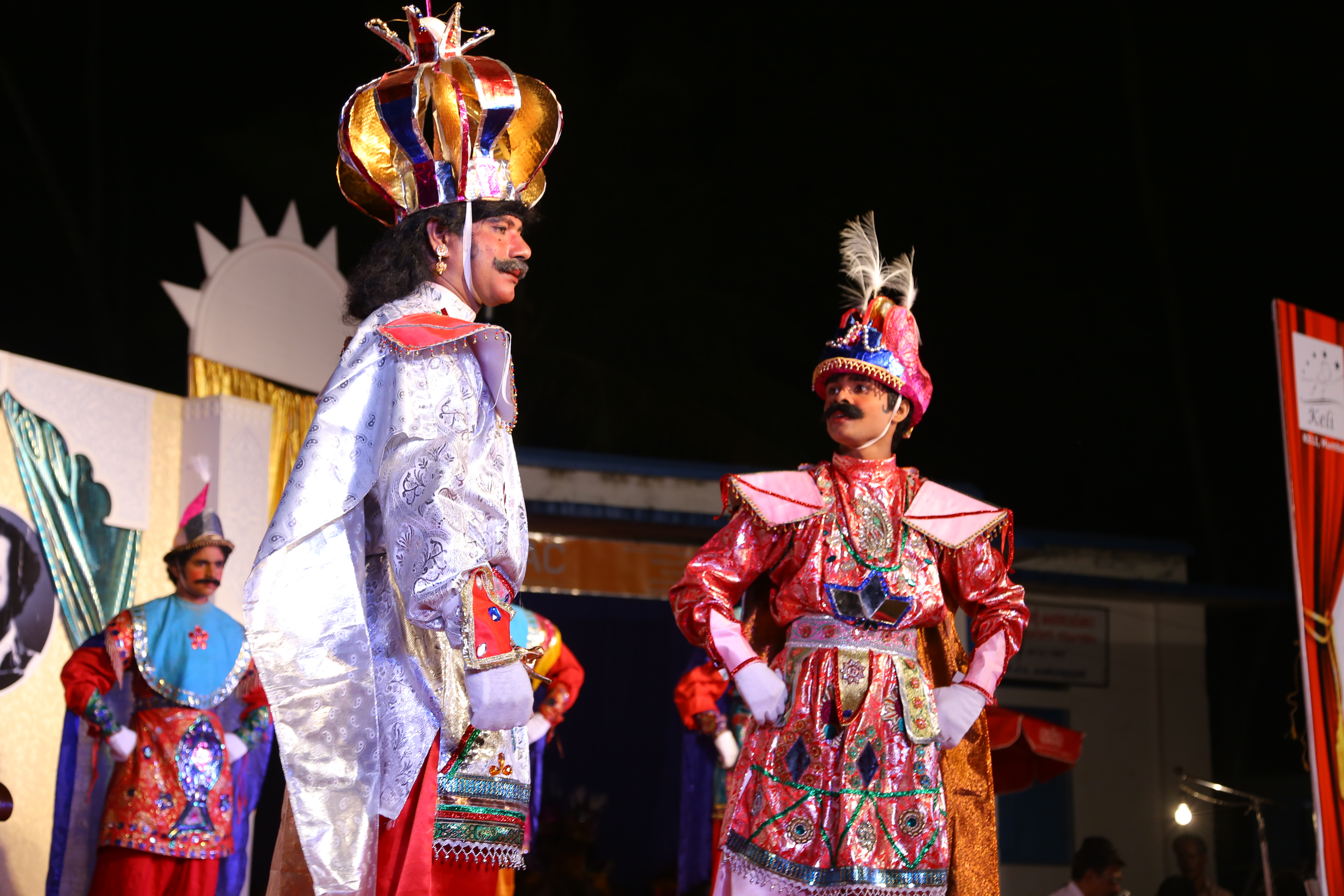
Njanasundari Chavittunadakam by Navarathna Kala Samskarika Vedi, Thuruthippuram at Chuvadi Fest

Inhabitants are mainly Christians and Hindus. The village is known for hosting boat races and has a boat club named 'Thuruthipuram Boat Club (TBC)'. TBC rowing Gabriel Chundan won Nehru Trophy in 2017 beating Mahadevikkad Kattilthekkethi. Thuruthipuram also has a snake boat (iruttukuthi category) in its name, one of the first competing snake boats (oodivallom) bearing the name of a village. The village also has a volleyball team called 'Pournami' and a football club called 'Arrows '. Many villagers also practice Chavittu nadakam, a classical art form of Latin Christians.

=== Festivals ===
St. Francis Church's feast is usually celebrated during the first week of October, followed by the feast of Saint Mary in December. Both Onam and Christmas are celebrated with the same vigour by the people.

Point of Interest near Thuruthipuram
- Kottappuram Fort: 2 km
- Malavana Paara: 6 km
- Muziris Market: 2 km
- Cherai Beach: 13 km
- Munakkal Beach, Azhikode: 11 km
- Cochin International Airport: 24 km

== See also ==
- North Paravur
- Ernakulam District
