= Thiruvaloor Mahadeva Temple =

Hindu temple in Kerala, India

Thiruvaloor Mahadeva temple
- Maha Siva Temple, Thiruvaloor
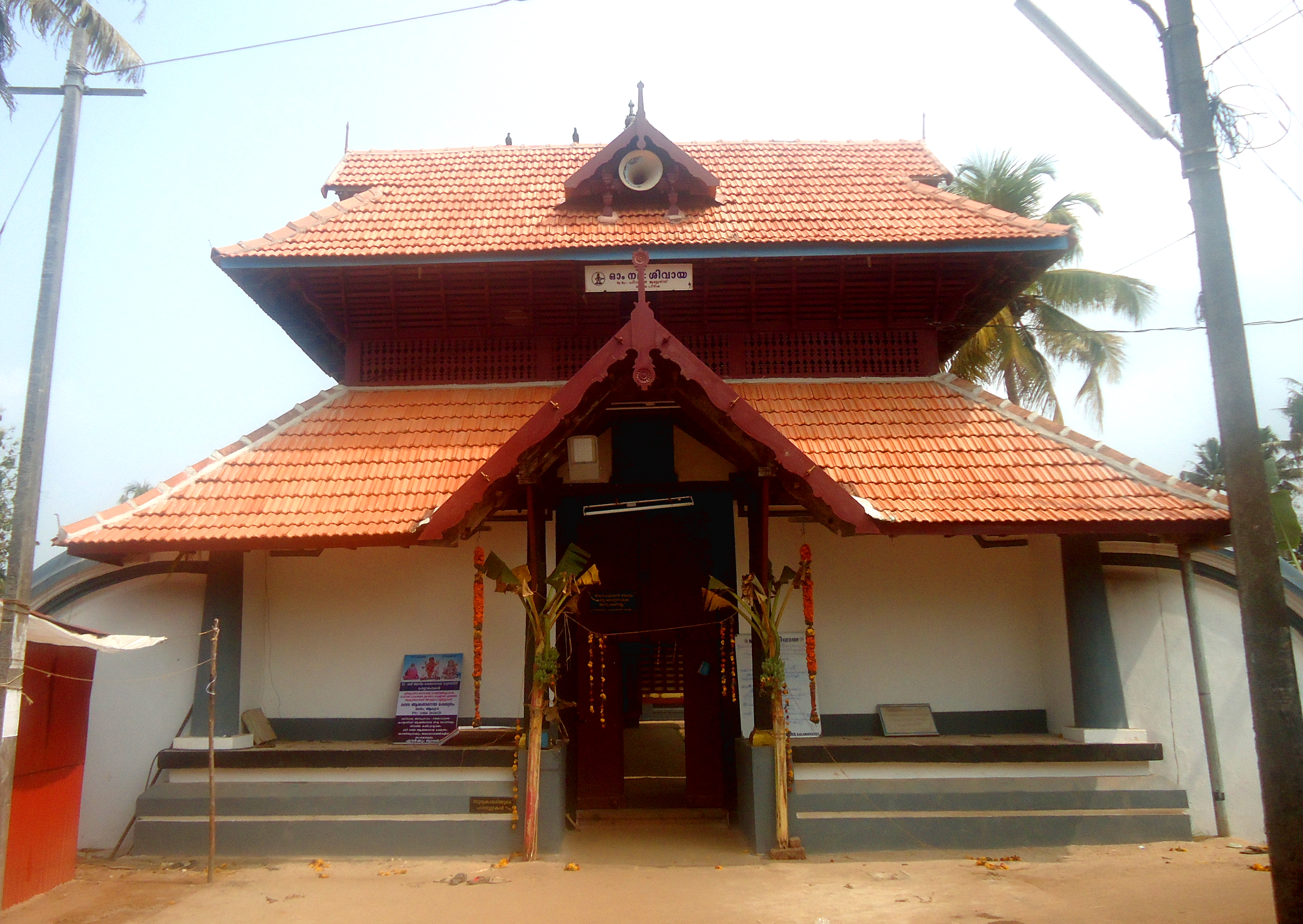
- Entrance of Thiruvaloor Mahadeva temple

- Location within Kerala

Religion
- Affiliation: Hinduism
- District: Ernakulam
- Deity: Lord Shiva
- Festivals: Main Festival, Shivaratri

Location
- Location: Alangad
- State: Kerala
- Country: India
- Interactive map of Thiruvaloor Mahadeva temple
- Coordinates: 10°7′7.33″N 76°18′31.59″E

Architecture
- Type: Kerala Traditional
- Completed: 11
- Temple: 1

Thiruvaloor Mahadeva Temple is situated in Thiruvaloor kara of Alangad Village, in Ernakulam district. This temple is listed among the famous siva temples in Kerala, India.

The idol here is believed to be an Agni Pratishta, i.e., with Lord Siva's third eye open. You can see the pond situated in east direction of the temple in line with the idol, in sree kovil. It is believed that this is because, the fire( agni) emitting from the idol can be harmful to people. In order to smoothen that effect the pond is constructed in that way.

The other idol in the temple is Lord Ganapati.

Also as a subsidiary of Thiruvalloor Mahadeva Temple, Keezhanikavu is situated very next to the temple, having Vishnu, Bhagavati and Nagas as idols.

The website of the temple is https://thiruvaloormahadevatemple.in/
