= Alangad =

Village in Kerala

Alangad Mangad
- Village
- Location in Kerala, India Alangad (India)
- Coordinates: 10°6′0″N 76°18′0″E
- Country: India
- State: Kerala
- District: Ernakulam

Government
  - Body: Alangad

Area
  - Total: 18.35 km^{2} (7.08 sq mi)

Population
  - Total: 31,870
  - Density: 1,739/km^{2} (4,500/sq mi)
- Demonym: Alangattukaran

Languages
  - Official: Malayalam, English
- Time zone: UTC+5:30 (IST)
- PIN: 683511
- Telephone code: 0484
- Vehicle registration: KL 42
- Kochi: Aluva, North Paravur
- Sex ratio: 1008 : 1000 ♂/♀
- Literacy: 99%
- Lok Sabha constituency: Ernakulam
- Assembly constituency: Kalamassery
- Civic agency: Alangad
- Website: [ lsgkerala.in/alangadpanchayat]]

Alangad is a village located in Paravur Taluk of Ernakulam District in the Indian state of Kerala. It lies almost in the middle of North Paravur and Aluva. The Kochi city is 15 km away from Alangad.

== Etymology ==
The name Alangad has been derived from alam meaning sugarcane and gad which refers to the Malayalam word കാട് [kaadu] meaning jungle.

== History ==
Alangad was once famous in the state for its sugarcane fields. In the past, Alangad was a small kingdom ruled by the Alangad Kings. Visscher refers to the battle that took place between the Alangad King (Alangad Mootha Karthakal) and the Paravoor (N.Parur) King in his 'Letters from Malabar' written in 1720CE. In the last decade of the 16th century, a Syrian Christian named Mathoo Chakkarayakathoottu was the Akambady Sena Nayakar (Captain of Guards) of the Alangad Raja's Christian subjects. During the time of Diamper Synod (Udayamperoor Sunnahados) a milestone in the history of Saint Thomas Christians, Akambady Nayakan Mathoo was deputed by Alangattu Raja to take care of the security of the then Archdeacon Gheevarghese of Malankara Nazrani Christians. In the first decade of the 17th century, Akambady Nayakn Maathu migrated to Kottayam and continued as Akambady Nayakan of Thekkumkur Raja which is in present-day Kottayam.

In 1756 Kozhikkodu Zamorin invaded Alangad and Parur. Later Kozhikkode Zamorin and Travancore Raja had a treaty of friendship in 1763–64 period and the Zamorin reimbursed amounting to ₹ 150,000 to Travancore which was the expenses of the war that occurred between them in the past. That was the time Kingdoms of Parur and Alangad were annexed to Travancore after pensioning off the ruling King.

Years back Alangad had its own place in the agricultural industry. The village was scenic with its greenery and was covered almost entirely with vast expanses of paddy fields and Coconut trees. Later on the advent of red bricks business made the Paddy fields almost vanish literally. The village had fertile soil, which gave good crops for all types of agriculture. The place is situated on the banks of Periyar River, which is called "Muttupuzha" (knee river) in this area as it used to have knee-deep water during summers and people could cross it on foot. But since a huge amount of sand is taken from the river bed it is no longer shallow or safe to walk through even in summers. The former rulers of Alangand were known as "Alangadu Karthakal". It is also home to two famous and oldest religious sites in Kerala "St Mary's Church" Alangad and "Alangad Juma musjid". Thiruvaloor Mahadeva Temple, one of the 108 known Shiva temples in Kerala, which is more than a thousand years old, is located on the soil of Alangad. Alangad and Akaparambu were well known for the Kalaripayattu Martial Art training in the ancient time. Legend has it that Lord Sabarimala Sree Ayyappan took lessons in the traditional martial art Kalarippyattu at Alangad.

Alangad at that time is believed to have had a powerful army. The Alangad Yogam begins their yatra to Erumely en route to Sabarimala for the Erumeli Pettathullal in the month of January every year.

== Economy ==
Alangad is located just 9.8 km away from North Paravur and 10 km away from Aluva City. Once clay brick business was the main trade as Clay was available. Major heavy mechanical vehicles, bus and small cars have their warehouses and PDI centers on the highway.

One of the major economies for the whole panchayath is from the remittances of expatriate community.

Business:

- T.V.Sundram Iyengar & Sons Ltd. Alangad
- NMD (Neerikode Milk Dairy)

== Notable people ==
- Kariattil Iousep, Former Metropolitan and Gate of All India
- Mar Varghese Payyappilly Palakkappilly, Former vicar of Alangad St. Mary's Church

== See also ==
- Koonammavu
