= Uliyannoor =

Village in India

Uliyannoor Kunjunikkara
- Village
- Location within Kerala
- Coordinates: 10.1167°N 76.3500°E
- Country: India
- State: Kerala
- District: Ernakulam

Uliyannoor (also known as Uliyannore) is a small village situated near Aluva within the Ernakulam district of Kerala, India. The village lies on the banks of the Periyar river (also known as "Aluva puzha"), close to Varapuzha and North Paravur. The villages Uliyannoor and Kunjinikkara lying between two distributaries of the Periyar river that rejoin in Kayantikkara.

== Filmography ==
Vineeth Sreenivasan's song "Aluva Puzhayude" song from movie Premam(2015) was filmed at the Periyar river.

== Landmarks ==
- Uliyannoor Juma Masjid
- Kunjinikkara Juma Masjid
- Manar Masjid
- Government LP School
- Uliyannoor Mahadeva Temple
