= Kadungalloor =

Village in Kerala, India

- Village
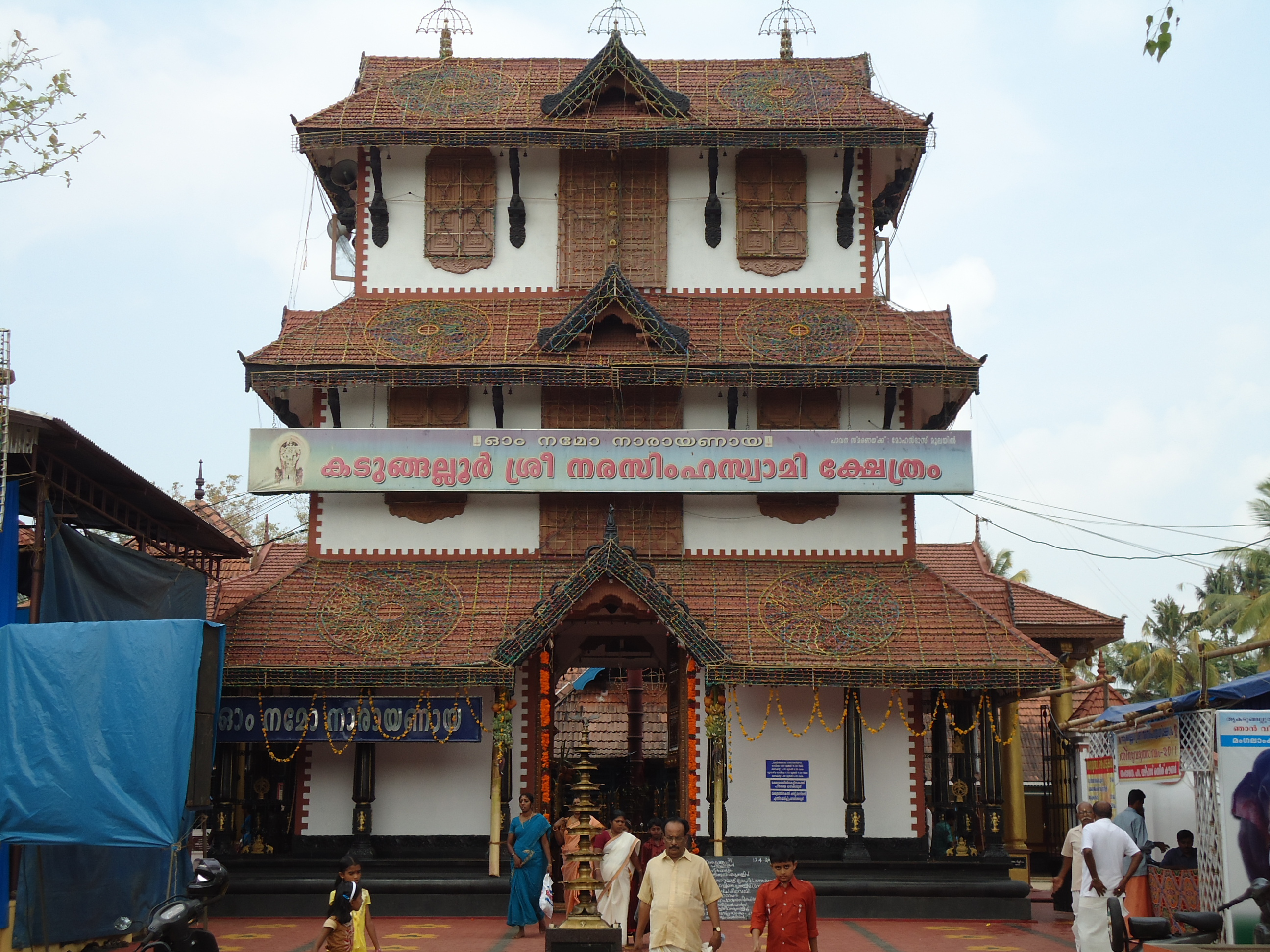
- Narasimha temple, Kadungallur
- Interactive map of Kadungalloor
- Coordinates: 10.096022°N 76.317829°E
- Country: India
- State: Kerala
- District: Ernakulam

Government
  - Body: Kadungalloor

Area
  - Total: 18.06 km^{2} (6.97 sq mi)
- Elevation: 11 m (36 ft)

Population
  - Total: 30,539
  - Density: 1,691/km^{2} (4,380/sq mi)

Languages
  - Official: Malayalam, English
- Time zone: UTC+5:30 (IST)
- PIN: 683102
- Telephone code: 0484
- Vehicle registration: KL-41
- Nearest city: Aluva
- Sex ratio: 994 ♂/♀
- Lok Sabha constituency: Ernakulam
- Civic agency: Kadungalloor
- Website: lsgkerala.in/kadungalloorpanchayat

Kadungalloor, IPA: [kɐɖuŋːɐlːuːr], is a village situated near Aluva. The village belongs to the Paravur Taluk of the Ernakulam district in the Indian state of Kerala. The industrial estates of Muppathadam and Edayar are located in Kadungalloor.

== Demographics ==
According to 2001 census data, Kadungalloor has a population of 35,451, evenly distributed between men and women. The average literacy rate is 81%, which is above the national average of 59.5%. About 13% of the population is below the age of 7. According to reports, there are 10,125 houses situated in Kadungalloor.

== Transport ==
The nearest railway station is the Aluva railway station, which is about 5 km (3.1 mi) from Kadungalloor. The Cochin International Airport (CIAL) is situated at a distance of 14 km (8.7 mi) from Kadungalloor.

== Landmarks and attractions ==
The Kadungalloor Panchayat is divided into East Kadungalloor and West Kadungalloor.

The temple at Uliyannoor is believed to be built by Perumthachan. Sree Narasimha Swami Temple is the largest temple situated in Kadungalloor. Many devotees visit the temple for its famous paal payasam (a sweet drink prepared with milk and rice) and an annual festival.

St.John The Apostle Church, First Church in India with St.John The Apostle as Patron Saint. On Church Feast many devotees visit church.

== Industries ==
The following industrial units are present in Kadungalloor:

- Cochin Minerals and Rutile Limited Ltd. (C.M.R.L)
- Indo-German Karbon
- Periyar Forms

== Religious Places ==
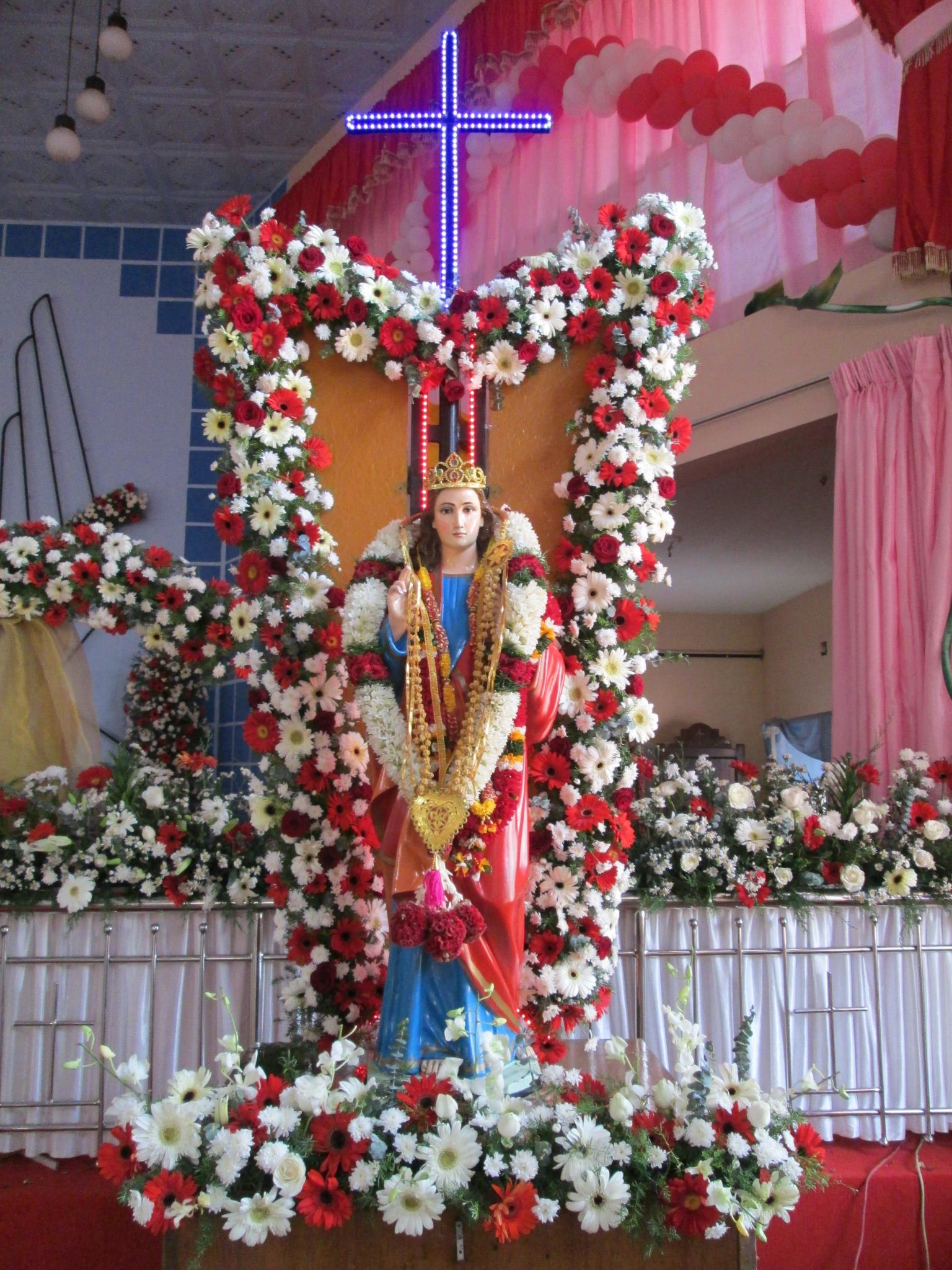
St.John The Apostle

There are around 21 temples, 9 mosques, 3 churches in are located in this panchayat, including but not limited to:

- Sree Narasimha Swamy Temple, East Kadungalloor
- Kunnil Sree Dharmasastha temple, West Kadungalloor
- Muppathadam Kainikkara Sreekrishna Swami Temple
- Sri Chattukulathappan Siva Temple.
- Bhuvaneswari Temple
- Rudhiramala Bhagavathy Temple West Kadungalloor
- Theakumkavu Bhagavathi Temple, Elapilly Mana, East Kadungalloor
- Elookkara Pulloorppilly Kavu Temple
- St.Sebastian Church, Elookkara
- Kadungalloor Juma Masjid
- St. John The Apostle Church, Muppathadam
- Holy Angels Church, Muppathadam
- Muppathadam Muthukad bhagavathy Temple
- Muppathadom Parayanat Bhagavathy Temple
- Muppathadam Sree Subrahmanya Swami Temple
- Muppathadam chandrasekharapuram Siva Temple
- Muppathadam Kaambillil Sree Dharmasastha Temple
- Muppathadam chittukunnil Hariharapura Temple
- Muppathadam kannoth Sreekrishna Swami Temple
- Kayantikkara Bhagavathy Temple
- Edavathara badrakali temple

== Education ==
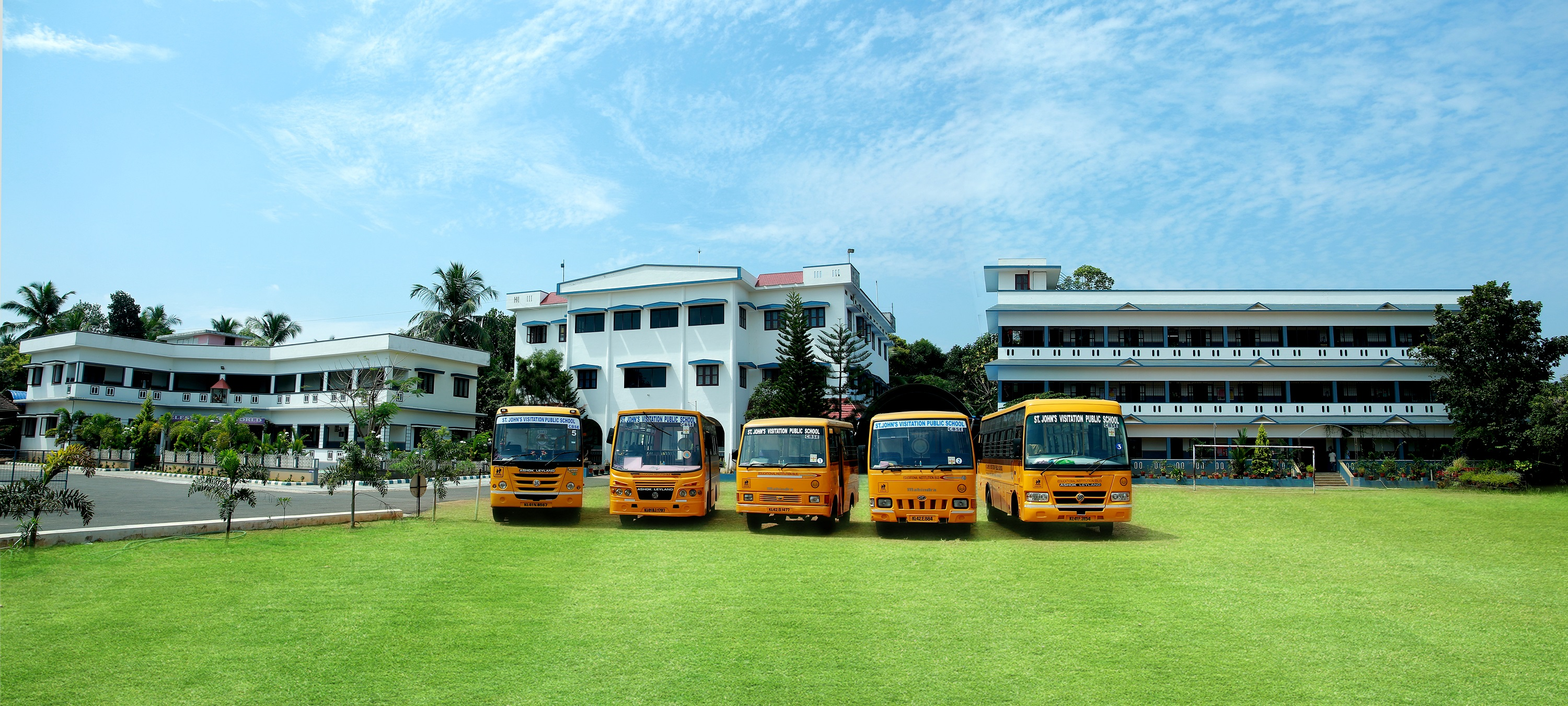
St. Johns Visitation Public School, Muppathadam

The educational institutions located here include:

- Muppathadam HSS
- Govt. HS West Kadungalloor
- Govt. LP School, East kadungalloor
- UP School, West Kadungalloor
- UP School, Uliyannoor
- St.John's Visitation Public School, Muppathadam
- Rajasree S.M.M School

== Godowns ==
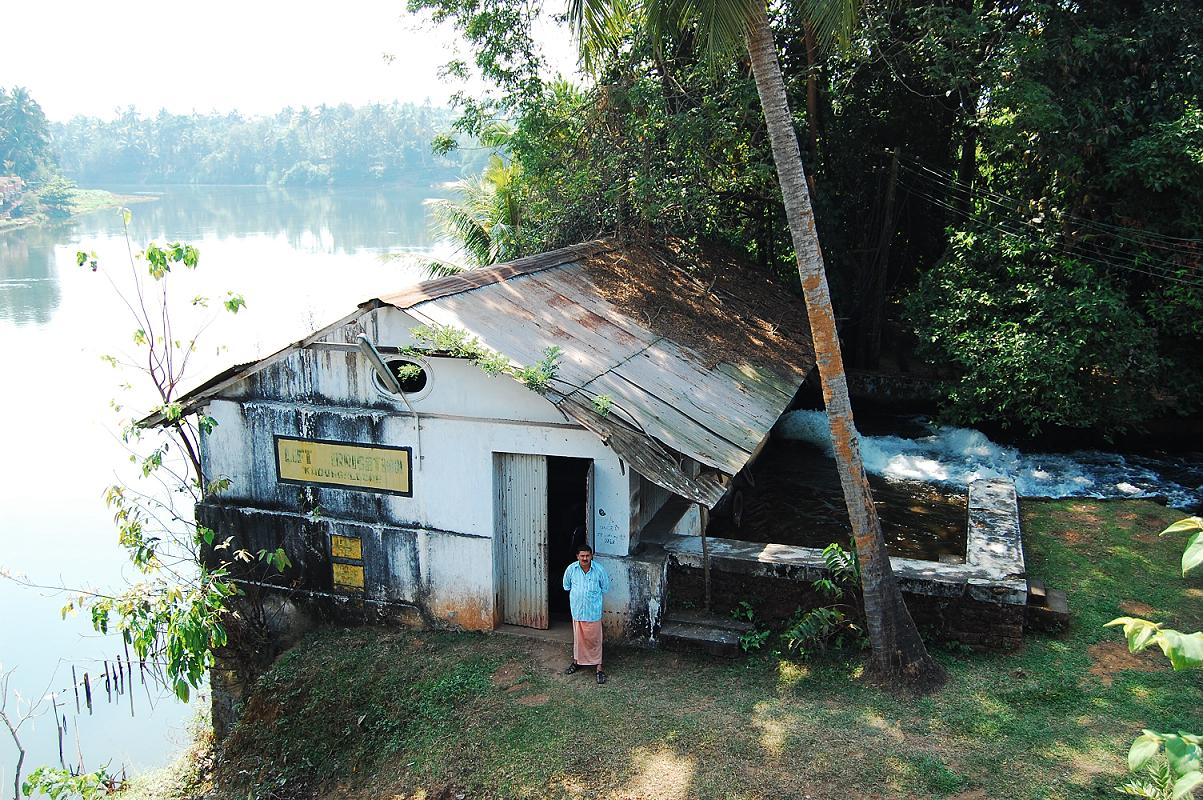
An irrigation center on the Periyar river in Kadungallur.

Considering the proximity to the Vallarpadom Port and Cochin International Airport, there has been a surge in the number of godowns built in the area.

== See also ==
- Paravur Taluk
- Ernakulam district
