= Kottuvally =

- Village
- Location in Kerala, India
- Coordinates: 10.1137109°N 76.2454606°E
- Country: India
- State: Kerala
- District: Ernakulam

Area
  - Total: 20.82 km^{2} (8.04 sq mi)

Population
  - Total: 37,884
  - Density: 1,820/km^{2} (4,713/sq mi)

Languages
  - Official: Malayalam, English
- Time zone: UTC+5:30 (IST)
- Telephone code: 0484
- Vehicle registration: KL-42
- Nearest city: North Paravur
- Sex ratio: 1052 ♂/♀

Kottuvally is a census town near Paravoor. It is also a village in Paravur Taluk, Ernakulam district in the Indian state of Kerala situated towards the southern part of the taluk. The nearest town is North Paravur, 4 km away, and the panchayat of Kottuvally is spread out on both sides of Panvel - Kochi - Kanniyakumari Highway

== History ==
Kottuvally is one of the early nine panchayats formed in Travancore. It is notable for the many social activists who lived here and fought against untouchability and other practises. They also initiated strikes in agricultural fields for more payments, etc. Thattapilly - Cheriyapilly - Ernakulam boat service is now history. In 1962, the Cheriyapilly Bridge opened.

== Life ==
The people in Kottuvally depend on fishing, pokkali cultivation, and other jobs.

== Demographics ==
As of 2001 India census, Kottuvally had a population of 37,884. Males constitute 49% of the population and females 51%. Kottuvally has an average literacy rate of 84%, higher than the national average of 59.5%: male literacy is 86%, and female literacy is 83%. In Kottuvally, 10% of the population is under 6 years of age.

== Religious ==
Masjids

- Vaniyakkad Juma Masjid
- Kaitharam juma masjid
- Valluvally juma masjid
- Cheriyappilly juma masjid
- Kattenellure Munavarsha Thangal Masjid Tattappilly

Temples

- Kottuvallykkav temple
- Mannam Subramanya temple
- Thrikkapuram Bhagavathy temple
- Kottuvally Sreenarayana temple ( https://web.archive.org/web/20160127201113/http://www.kottuvallysreenarayanatemple.com/ )
- Pazhangat Sree Kaleeswari temple
- Kandakarnan temple

Churches

- Koonamav St.Philomanas Church where the tomb of Father Chavara is kept
- St.Sebastians church kottuvally
- St. Antony Church, Cheriyapilly
- St. Antony Church, Kochal, Valluvally

== Educational institutions ==
- St. Philomanas HSS
- Kuriakose Chavara memorial Private ITI
- Chavara Darsan CMI Public School
- Kaitharam Govt. HSS
- Govt. UPS, Schoolpaddy, Valluvally.
- Thattapilly UP School
- Kottuvally UP School
- St.Louis LP School
- St.Josephs UP School, Koonamav

== Health ==
- Govt. Hospital, Koonamav
- Little Flower Hospital

== Localities ==
Vaniyakkad, Kaitharam, Kizhkkepram, Kuttanthuruth, Mannam, Thattapilly, Valluvally, Kochal, Koonamav, Kottuvallikav, Cheriyapilly, Kottuvally, Thrikkapuram

== See also ==
- Paravur Taluk
- Ernakulam district
