= North Paravur =

Municipality in Kerala

- Municipality
- Location within Kerala Location within India
- Coordinates: 10.15°N 76.23°E
- Country: India
- State: Kerala
- District: Ernakulam
- City UA: Kochi
- Established: 1912

Government
  - Type: Municipality
  - Body: Municipal Council of North Paravur
  - Chairperson: Ramesh D Kurup
  - Vice Chairperson: Laiji Biju

Area
  - Total: 9.02 km^{2} (3.48 sq mi)
- Elevation: 13 m (43 ft)

Population
  - Total: 31,503
  - Density: 3,490/km^{2} (9,050/sq mi)

Languages
  - Official: Malayalam, English
- Time zone: UTC+5:30 (IST)
- PIN: 683513
- Telephone code: 0484
- Vehicle registration: KL-42
- Website: North Paravur Municipality

North Paravur (IPA: [vɐɖɐkːɐn pɐrɐʋuːr]; commonly known as Paravur or Parur, is a municipality is a major town and municipality in the northwestern part of the Kochi metropolitan area in the Indian state of Kerala. Situated near the confluence of the Periyar River, Chalakudy River, and the Arabian Sea, it serves as an important residential, commercial, and administrative centre in Ernakulam district. North Paravur is part of the Kochi metropolitan area and is located 26 km (16.2 mi) north of the Kochi city centre.

North Paravur is noted for its rich cultural, religious, and historical heritage. The town has been an important centre of trade and settlement since ancient times and formed part of the historic Kingdom of Cochin. It is home to several ancient Hindu temples, churches, and mosques, including the historic Jewish and Syrian Christian heritage sites, most notable being the Chendamangalam Synagogue. North Paravur also occupies an important place in Kerala's maritime history due to its proximity to the ancient port of Muziris. Historically, the town developed as a thriving commercial settlement connected to inland waterways and coastal trade routes.

== History ==
Chendamangalam Junction in North Paravur

North Paravur was the first constituency to hold elections using Electronic Voting Machine (EVM) in 1982. EVMs were used in 50 polling stations out of the total 123.

== Demographics ==
As of 2011 Census, Paravur had a population of 31,503 with 15,060 males and 16,443 females. Paravur municipality have an area of 9.02 km^{2} (3.48 sq mi) with 8,095 families residing in it. 8% of the population was under 6 years of age. Paravur had an average literacy of 96.75% higher than the state average of 94%: male literacy was 97.8% and female literacy was 95.8%.

== Geography ==
Paravur is located at 10.14° N 76.7° E[1]. It has an average elevation of 10 metres (32 feet). The town is situated at north end of Ernakulam district and bordering with Thrissur district. The towns in Thrissur district like Kodungallore, Mala, Chalakudy and the towns Kalamassery, Aluva, Angamaly, Vypin island are located near to this town. The Paravur Taluk lies in the flat delta region of the Periyar river and cut by several canals, which have resulted in the formation of many islands. The Kodungalloor Kayal (backwaters) and Varappuzha Kayal (backwaters) are in this taluk. The town and neighboring areas were deeply affected by floods in 2018 due to heavy rain.

== See also ==
- Muziris
- Aluva–Paravur Road
