= Kuriapilly =

Village in Kerala, India

- rural
- Interactive map of Kuriapilly
- Coordinates: 10.15°N 76.20°E
- Country: India
- State: Kerala
- District: Ernakulam
- Elevation: 8 m (26 ft)

Population (2001)
  - Total: <3,000

Languages
  - Official: Malayalam, English
- Time zone: UTC+5:30 (IST)
- PIN: 683516
- Telephone code: 0484-248
- Vehicle registration: KL-42
- Sex ratio: 97:109 ♂/♀
- Website: [ www.madaplathuruth.in/%20Madaplathuruth/Kuriapilly]]

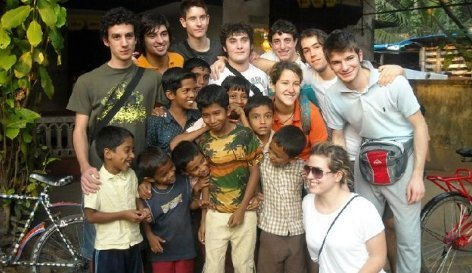
Children with their Italian Sponsors

Kuriappilly now known as Kuriappilly, Kuriappilly South, labor Junction, Shappupadi (Toddy parlor ferry, Kappelapadi. Kuriapilly was a border of Travancore kingdom in the British India, the name Kuriapilly is old up to 500 years, even in the letters of Tippu Sultan we can see the name Kuriapilly. Now it is in state of Kerala. The village is 22 km away from Kochi, most developed city of Kerala. The ancient seaport of India, Muziris is located in Pattanam village 0.7 km away from this.

== Overview ==
The various denominations of modern Saint Thomas Christians ascribe their unwritten tradition to the end of the 2nd century and believe that Thomas landed at Maliankara near Madaplathuruth village in Paravur Taluk in AD 52.

Olden times Madaplathuruth was known for coir products and handloom clothes. But nowadays it is well known by the marble and granite showrooms.

== History ==
Before independence most of the area under an old Land Lords of Othumbukattil Malayalam ഒതുംബ്ബുംകാട്ടില്‍family Appukuttamenon. During the time of Tippu Sultan's attack Travencoor King created a big fake fort using the Bamboo, Araknut Tree and bitumen. Tippu's army misleaded and they spend their large time to destroy the fort using canon fire. Remains of a Portuguese fort is still there in Kottapuram. During the time of digging in Kuriappilly, people still found the shells of old war. One small stream named "Vadathodu" is flowing towards the Periyar River, which was once an International boundary separating the Kingdom of Cochin from the Travancore Kingdom. On its west lay Travancore (Madaplathuruthu and Moothakunnam), and on its east was Kingdom of Cochin (Vadakkumpuram and, of course, Chendamangalam where Paliath Achan, the Cochin Kingdom's minister lived). So goes one story: a thief, chased by the police of one kingdom, crossed Vadathodu over to the other kingdom, and escaped; the police had to simply watch on helplessly. International borders didn't matter for thieves, but did for the police.

== Geography ==
Kuriappilly is located at 10.09° N 76.12° E[1]. It has an average elevation of 4 metres (12 feet).

The village is situated at north end of Ernakulam district. The town Kodungallore. The Madaplathuruth lies in the flat delta region of the Periyar River and cut by several canals, which have resulted in the formation of many islands. The Kodungalloor Kayal (backwaters) and So many Small canals (backwaters) are in this Village.

== Significance ==
Madaplathuruth village is larger village and a thickly populated area between Thuruthippuram and Moothakunnam was known for coir products. Most of the people were connected with this small scale industry. The rest of the people were engaged in Khadi cloth manufacturing, handloom and building construction fields. Now this place is known for the showrooms of marbles and granites. The same village is famous for its highly skilled manpower in construction, wooden works, sweet sand miners from the river Periyar.

== Lifestyle ==
Madaplathuruth/Kuriappilly is a densely populated area.

- It has hundred percent literacy.

98% of population benefits one school within a distance of 1 km. An upper primary school within a distance of 1.5 km is available for more than 96% of the people, whose 98% benefit the facility for secondary education within 5 km. The access for village students to higher educational institutions like engineering, medical, arts, science, TTC, M.edu, ITCs are within a distance of 3 km and are facilitated by widely subsidised transport fares. Most of them run by HMDP Sabha Moothakunnam, Christian managements and by Government. 98% of institutions are aided by Kerala state government.

- 99% of houses are electrified by the KSEB.
- 92.6% house own Televisions and news papers.

Satellite television services are available through Doordarshan Direct Plus, Dish TV Sun Direct and Tata Sky. The Multisystem operators in Madaplathuruth are Asianet, Kerala Vision, Citi Cable.

- 90.7% house own telephones and 99% have mobile phones.

== Economy ==
The main business is trade shops, stationery. Here we can see marble selling shops. At least ninety-five percent of the population is above the poverty line. Few inhabitants are government employees. In the past, most of the men were coir, khadi workers but now, most of the village's population is employed in the construction, and marble industry and also a few people are abroad ( mainly in Gulf) and in IT industries (Bangalore, Hyderabad, and Mumbai. A family's average income is about four to ten dollars per day.

== Sponsorship ==
Sisters of St Elizabeth run child sponsorship programs in this village, Without considering The religion or cast they are selecting children and they will arrange a sponsor from Italy, Switzerland and other European nations.

They use the funds directly for the child and their immediate community or family for their school fees and other educational needs. All these programs are controlled by the vicar of St George Church Madaplathuruth. They are also sponsoring major operation like Cardiac, Urinal and different types of tumors etc.

== Religion ==
The people tend to co-operative and conservative, and the main religions are Hindus, Christians and a few Muslims etc.

There are Christian churches i.e. St. George Church, Unni Mishika chapel, St Sebastien Chapel, St Antony Minor Church are in Madaplathuruth. Also there are some family temples too most of them are owned to Hindu Nair family like Thattaruparambil, Othumbukattil, Jnodil, Kozhupilly etc.

Andippillikavu Bagavathi temple (Kavu) is located here. This temple has a history of more than 500 years. There is HDPY English medium senior secondary school near to this temple.
