= Madaplathuruth =

Village in Paravur Taluk, Kerala, India

- rural
- Location in Kerala, India Madaplathuruth (India)
- Coordinates: 10.15°N 76.20°E
- Country: India
- State: Kerala
- District: Ernakulam

Government
  - Body: Vadakkekara

Area
  - Total: 333 km^{2} (129 sq mi)
- Elevation: 4 m (13 ft)

Population (2001)
  - Total: 3,000
  - Density: 9.0/km^{2} (23/sq mi)

Languages
  - Official: Malayalam, English
- Time zone: UTC+5:30 (IST)
- PIN: 683516
- Telephone code: 0484-248
- Vehicle registration: KL-42
- Sex ratio: 97:109 ♂/♀
- Lok Sabha constituency: Ernakulam
- Civic agency: Vadakkekara
- Website: [ www.madaplathuruth.in/%20Madaplathuruth/Kuriapilly]]

Madaplathuruth is a village in Paravur Taluk, state of Kerala. Formerly known as Kuriapilly, it was a part of the Travancore kingdom in the British India. The village is 22 km away from Kochi. The ancient seaport of India, Muziris is located in Pattanam village 0.7 km away from this village.

== Overview ==
The coastal highway NH-66 Kanyakumari - Mumbai passes through this village. The National Waterway – 3 Kollam – Kottapuram passes through the western end of the village.

The various denominations of modern Saint Thomas Christians ascribe their unwritten tradition to the end of the 2nd century and believe that Thomas landed at Maliankara near Madaplathuruth village in AD 52.

Olden times Madaplathuruth was known for coir products and handloom clothes. But nowadays it is well known by the marble and granite showrooms.

== History ==
Madaplathuruth was under the administration of the king. Paravur king has joined hands with Kochi and was under the country of Kochi, but later Paravur was transferred to the Travancore area as part of an agreement. Before independence, most of the area under an old Land Lords of Othumbukattil Malayalam ഒതുംബ്ബുംകാട്ടില്‍family Appukuttamenon Malayalam അപ്പുക്കുട്ടമേനോൻ. Land area is about 333 acres and before independence, a large area of Appukuttamenon was bought by Chalamanamel, Thattakath family's(From Kuriapilly South to South Madaplathuruth). Currently in the government records that area is known as Chalmanamel Padam Malayalam ചാലമനമേല്‍ പാടം, the same name is using for Land registration and other government activity. Remain land are is controlled by old Nair families.

== Geography ==
Madaplathuruth is located at 10.15°N 76.20°E. It has an average elevation of 4 metres (12 feet).

The village is situated at north end of Ernakulam district. The towns Kodungallore, Munambam are located near by. Madaplathuruth lies in the flat delta region of the Periyar River and is cut by several canals, which have resulted in the formation of many islands. The Kodungalloor Kayal (backwaters) and many small canals (backwaters) are in this village.

Neighbouring Villages

== Significance ==
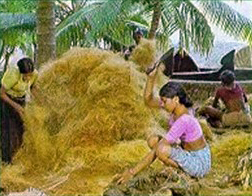
Segregation of coir fibre

Madaplathuruth village is larger village and a thickly populated area between Thuruthippuram and Moothakunnam was known for coir products. Most of the people were connected with this small scale industry. The rest of the people were engaged in khadi cloth manufacturing, handloom and building construction fields. Now this place is known for the showrooms of marbles and granites. The same village is famous for its highly skilled manpower in construction, wooden works, sweet sand miners from the river Periyar.

== Flora and fauna ==
This island has one of the highest densities of coconut trees. The island also boasts a wide range of other birds and animals. The kingfisher (നീലപ്പൊന്മാന്‍) is common in this island and other birds include black bulbul (depending on the season) brown falcon, crow, woodpecker, sparrow, raven, pigeon, African fish eagle and cuckoo. The island also has cows, goats etc. There are many sarpa kavu (abode of snakes, സര്‍പ്പക്കാവ്) near to the Hindu Nair homes and temples.

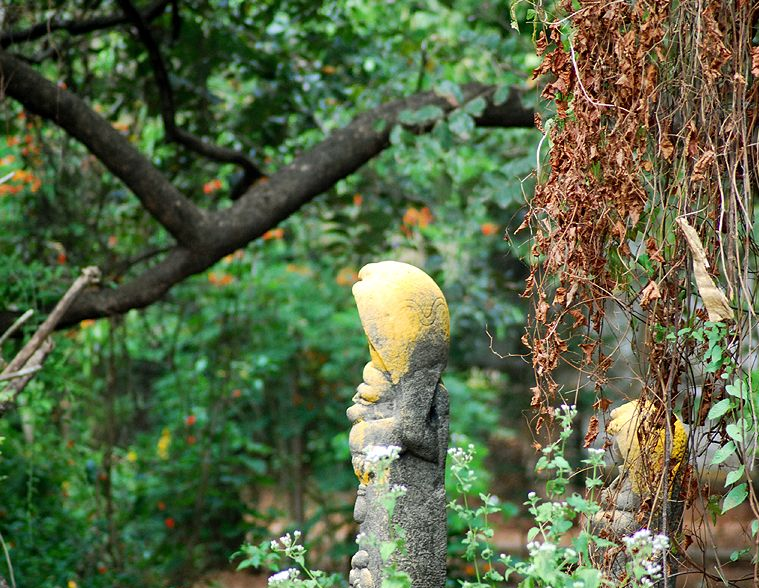
Sarpa kavu

== Lifestyle ==
Madaplathuruth is thickly populated.

- It has one hundred percent literacy.

98% of population benefits one school within a distance of 1 km. An upper primary school within a distance of 1.5 km is available for more than 96% of the people, whose 98% benefit the facility for secondary education within 5 km.The access for village students to higher educational institutions like engineering, medical, arts, science, TTC, M.edu, ITCs are within a distance of 3 km and are facilitated by widely subsidised transport fares. Most of them run by HMDP Sabha(The Hindu Matha Dharma Paripalana Sabha) Moothakunnam, Christian managements and by Government. 98% of institutions are aided by Kerala state government.

- 99% of houses are electrified by the KSEB.
- 92.6% house own Televisions and News Papers.

Satellite television services are available through Doordarshan Direct Plus, Dish TV Sun Direct and Tata Sky. The Multisystem operators in Madaplathuruth are Asianet, Kerala Vision, Citi Cable.

- 90.7% house own telephones and 99% have mobile phones.

== Health ==
Bharath Rural Hospital "ഭാരത് റൂറൽ ഹോസ്പിറ്റൽ" is the main hospital with 100 bed capacity. There is another clinic is running in south madaplathuruth governed by Sisters of Saint Elisabeth. Few Homie and Ayurveda clinic are also available in this village. Government Hospital in Mothakunnam is also near to this village.

== Economy ==
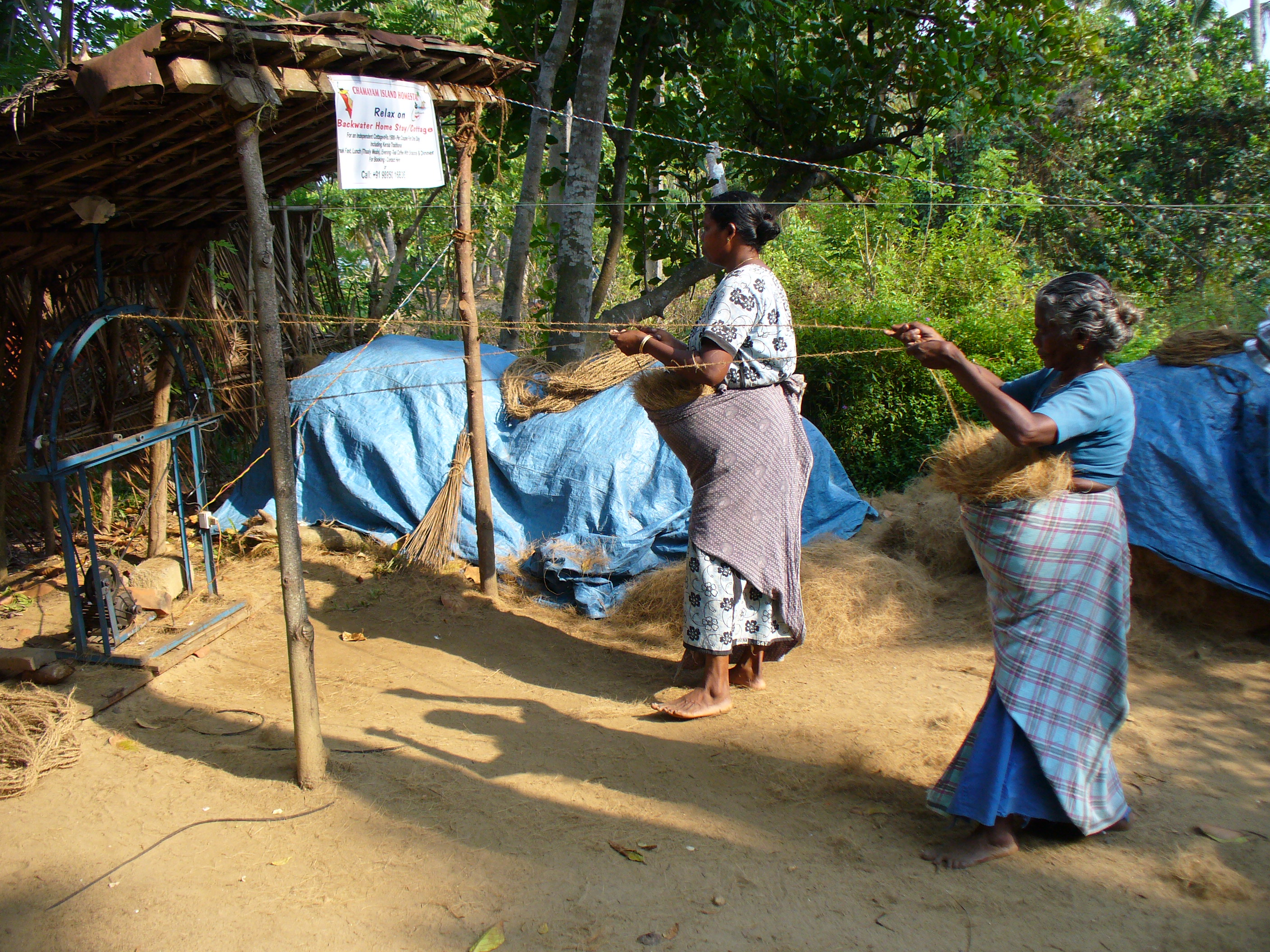
Making coir rope in Kerala, India

The main business is the trade shoppes, stationary. Here we can see marble selling shoppes. At least ninety-five percent of the population is above the poverty line. Few inhabitants are government employees. In the past, most of the men were coir, khadi "കയർ, ഖാദി "workers but now, most of the village's population is employed in the construction, and marble industry and also few people are in abroad( mainly in Gulf) and in IT industries(Bangalore, Hyderabad, and Mumbai. A family's average income is about four to ten dollars per day.

== Sponsorship Program ==
Sisters of St Elizabeth run child sponsorship programs in this village, Without considering The religion or cast they are selecting children and they will arrange a sponsor from Italy, Switzerland and other European nations.

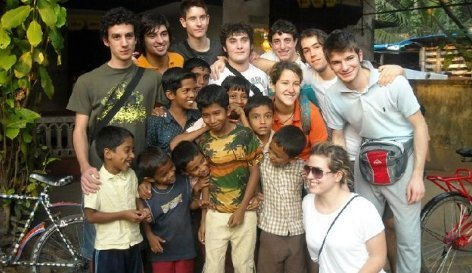
Sponsored Children with their Italian Sponsors in front of their home

They use the funds directly for the child and their immediate community or family for their school fees and other educational needs. All these programs are controlled by the vicar of St George Church Madaplathuruth. They are also sponsoring major operation like Cardiac, Urinal and different types of tumors etc.

== Religion ==
The people tend to co-operative and conservative, and the main religions are Hindus(Ezava, Nair, Dhevara, Harijans"ഈഴവ, നായർ, ഹരിജൻ"), Christians "ക്രിസ്ത്യൻ"(Catholics, Protestant) and a few Muslims"മുസ്ലിം" etc. There are Christian churches i.e. St. George Church, Unni Mishika chapel, St Sebastien Chapel, St Antony Minor Church are in Madaplathuruth. Also there are some family temples too most of them are owned to Hindu Nair family like Thattaruparambil, Othumbukattil, Jnodil, Kozhupilly etc.

Andippillikavu Bagavathi temple (Kavu) is located here. This temple has a history of more than 500 years. There is HDPY English medium senior secondary school near to this temple. Thevuruthil sree durgabhagavathi temple is another famous temple located in madaplathiruth.

== Member of Legislative Assembly - Parur ==
V.D. Satheesan is a Member of Kerala Legislative Assembly from Parur constituency, Ernakulam, Kerala, India. Now he is the current Opposition Leader of Kerala Assembly.

== Member of Panchayat - Vadakkekara ==
   

1. UDF (50.0%)
2. LDF (50.0%)
3. NDA (0.00%)
- Madaplathuruthu-west Ward No 6 - Hochmin Master, LDF.
- Madaplathuruthu-south Ward No 7 - VIJAYAKUMARI (VIJAYAMMA) P, UDF.
- Andippilly Kkavu Ward No 8 - Reshma Gopi, LDF.
- Madaplathuruthu- East Ward No 9 - K P Gopinath, UDF. He belongs to old family Othumbukattil described above.

== Amenities ==
- Vadakkekara Police station (Circle), Andipillykavu
- Kerala Police quarters, Andipillykavu
- Veterinary hospital, Andipillykavu
- Cristhu Raja Shopping complex, Kappelapadi
- Cristhu Raja Sangam, Madaplathuruth
- Bharath Rural Hospital, Kuriapilly South
- BSNL office-Area code MKM 0484-248, Kuriapilly
- KSEB office, Kuriapilly
- Vadakkekara Vyapari Vyavasai Association.(Merchant Association), Laber Junction(Kuriapilly South)
- Italian garment factory, ThekkeMadaplathuruth
- Kuriapilly Khadhi Co-Operative Society
- Rural Hospital, ThekkeMadaplathuruth run by sisters of St Elizabeth Italy
- English medium school, ThekkeMadaplathuruth run by sisters of St Elizabeth Italy
- Madaplathuruth Vividodesa Sahaya Sangham, Kappelapadi
- HDPY school, Andipillykkavu

== Transport ==
- National Highway 66 passing through the middle of this village
- Proposed new Highway 66
- Proposed Heavy transport road from Vallarpadam container terminal
- PWD road from Kuriapilly South to Munambam
- Many small village roads all are paved with bitumen.
- Another way of transport is through canals. Most of the sweet sand is transferred by canals.

=== Bus Stops in NH 66 ===
- Gothuruthkadavu, Gothuruth Ferry."ഗോതുരുത് കടവ്"
  - St. Sebastian Church, Kadalvathuruth, Gothuruth .
  - St. Antony's Chapel, Kuriapilly.
  - KSEB, Kuriappilly.
  - BSNL, Kuriappilly.
- Kuriapilly(Shappupady).
  - To places like Vadakkumpuram, Chendamangalam, Paradesi Synagogue.
