= Vadathodu =

Stream in North Paravur, Kerala, India

Vadathodu is a small stream in North Paravur, Kerala, India. It is a tributary of the Periyar river, which once formed the boundary between the Kingdom of Cochin and the Kingdom of Travancore, with Cochin (Vadakumpuram and Chendamangalam) on its east bank and Travancore (Madaplathuruth and Moothakunnam) on its west. In 1955, a bridge was built connecting Vadakumpuram and Madaplathuruth.
