= Sree Venugopla Krishna Swami Devasthan =

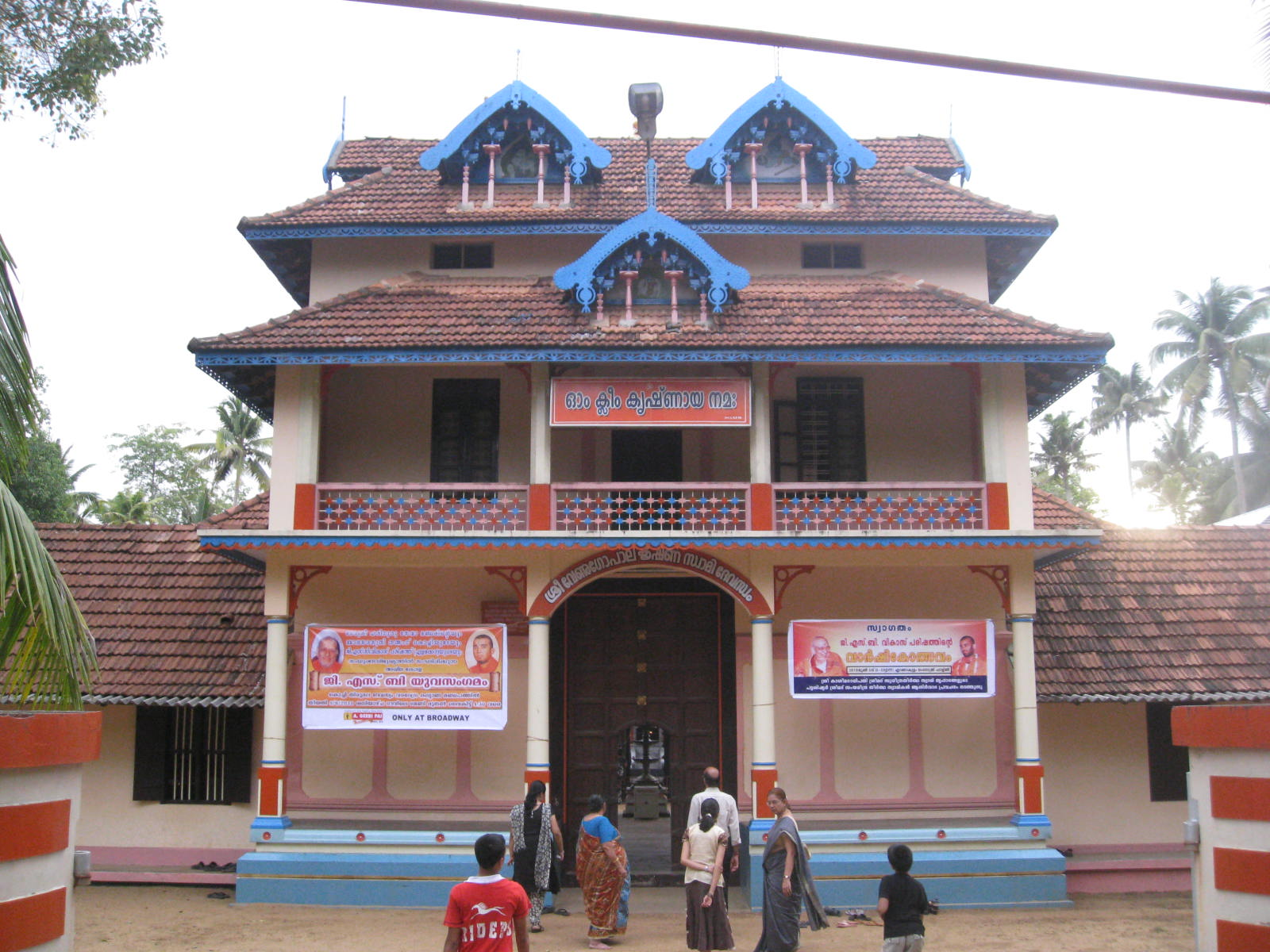
- Main entrance of the temple

- Sree Venugopala Krishna Swamy Temple, Chendamangalam, Ernakulam, Kerala

Religion
- Affiliation: Hinduism
- District: Ernakulam
- Deity: Krishna

Location
- Location: Chendamangalam
- State: Kerala
- Country: India
- Interactive map of Sree Venugopla Krishna Swami Devasthan
- Coordinates: 10.167801°N 76.244401°E

Architecture
- Completed: 1900
- Elevation: 30 m (98 ft)

Sree Venugopla Krishna Swami Devasthan is a Hindu temple located in Chendamangalam, Kerala, India. It was established in 1900 at Chendamangalam (earlier known as Jayantha mangalam), 42 km from Ernakulam, 22 km from Aluva and 5 km from North Paravur.

Its main deity is Venugopalakrishna Swamy, and its main idol is Shila Vigrah of Venugopalakrishna Swamy. It also contains an Utsav idol of the Lord and the idols of Garuda and Hanuman at his feet. The temple celebrates a six-day-long annual festival in the month of Vaisakh.

== Temple history ==
Those Gaud Saraswat Brahmins (GSB's) settled in Cochin spread to neighbouring suburbs and villages. Some families came and settled in Chennamangalam. Since they did not have any place of worship in the village, they had to visit the nearest temple at North Paravur by foot for spiritual needs. To remedy the situation, they joined together under Chennoth parambil Sri Dasa Prabhu and started efforts to establish a temple.

They approached the Paliath Valiyachan of the Paliyam Swaroopam and requested help. He donated the land for construction of temple. With the liberal donations from the locals, the temple was constructed, and the Pratishta made on 30 April 1900. Twelve community members under the leadership of Chennoth parambil Ramachandra Prabhu started a Chitty in 1920. The generated profit was used to acquire land for the temple to meet the daily expenses. Later, in 1956, the children of Chennoth parambil Sri Dasa Prabhu formed an Endowment Trust in his name and donated 10 acres of land and Rs. 65,000 to temple on behalf of the trust. In due course, necessary constructions such as Agrasala, Anapandal, etc. were made. The temple was renovated in 1995 and the Srikovil was covered with Copper plate.

Srimat Sudheendra Tirtha Swamiji had his Chaturmasya Vrita at this temple in 1973. At present there are about 100 GSB families in Chennamangalam.

== See also ==
- Temples of Kerala
