= Munduruthy =

- Village
- Location within Kerala Location within India
- Coordinates: 10.1797°N 76.2094°E
- Country: India
- State: Kerala
- District: Ernakulam
- Taluk: Paravur

Area
  - Total: 10.83 km^{2} (4.18 sq mi)

Languages
  - Official: Malayalam, English
- Time zone: UTC+5:30 (IST)
- PIN: 683520
- Telephone code: 0484
- Vehicle registration: KL-42

Munduruthy (or, Munduruthi) is a small village belonging to Chittatukara panchayat.

North Paravur Block, Ernakulam District, Kerala. The village is under Mannam Postoffice and the pin code is 683520. There are about 100 families living there and the nearby places are Palathuruth, Thekkumpuram and Thannipadam. There is a bridge that connects Munduruthy and Thannipadam, providing an easy path to North Paravur.

== Education ==
- Ankanvaddy, Munduruthy
- DDSHS Karimpadam
- SNHSS North Paravur

== Transportation ==
- Paravur - Kottayilkovilakom road via Munduruthy
- There was a private bus service at Munduruthy before and now its stopped

== See also ==
- North Paravur
- Ernakulam district
