= Paliyam Satyagraha =

Indian social movement

- Duration: December, 1947 to March, 1948
- Location: Chendamangalam, Cochin
- Motive: Public access
- Organised by: Sree Narayana Dharma Paripalana Yogam (SNDP); Pulaya Mahasabha; Communist Party of Kerala

The Paliyam Satyagraha (from December 1947 to March 1948) was the first organised Satyagraha in Kerala following independence of India. The satyagraha was organised to allow entry of the lower castes into the Paliam Road, which was situated next to the Palace of the Paliath Achan's.

== Background ==
The Paliath Achan's were Independent Raja's and held the hereditary prime ministership post in the Kingdom of Cochin. The Paliyam road passed through the areas surrounding the Palace of the Paliath family and even within the Palace complex. The road was however, off-limits to members of lower castes. The members of the Paliam royal family argued that certain roads leading to their residences were private roads, and, therefore they had the right to make them designated roads where they could ban movement of dalits and backward classes. They felt that the movement on the roads would disturb the ladies of the house and also pollute the sanctity of the temple in the vicinity.

On December 17, 1947 the Paliyam struggle commenced. Before that some efforts were made to avoid a struggle. On August 26, 1945 itself, the Praja Mandalam Working Committee met at Mala and decided to submit a memorandum to the Cochin Raja and set up a committee for launching direct action, if the Raja did not act. But no action was taken. On May 18, 1946 a delegation led by Kurur Nilakantan Namboodiripad met the Raja and submitted a fresh memorandum. The Raja explained the difficulties in getting the temples opened for all castes. The delegation then announced that they would be constrained to initiate a mass agitation.

A unique feature of the Paliyam struggle was the scale and variety of participation. For instance, groups of women from Ernakulam, members and activists of SNDP Yogam, Bidi Workers’ Trade Union, Yukthi Vada Sanghom (Rationalist group) Arya Mahajanasabha, Kochi Praja Mandalam, CPI unit of Anthikkad, Socialist Party of Mala, Tile Workers’ Union of Panamkulam, The Namboodiri Jatha, V.K.M. Mahasabha, Christian Youth Movement, Kerala Socialist Party and RSP participated in the struggle.

Already Christians, Muslims and Jews had been permitted to use the roads selectively for rendering trade and commercial services. But by tradition and to protect the privacy of the family members, the roads had been closed to dalits. The Press tried to inform the public that the Ernakulam District Court had decreed the right of Paliyam family to decide on the use of their private roads.

The Estate Manager of the Paliyam family was the son of a maharaja from the Cochin royalty. He used that influence and brought a big contingent of police and they were allowed to open a police camp at Thekke Madhom (the present Nair Service Society(NSS) Jubilee Hall). On December 7, 1947, a special Magistrate and armed police arrived from Kodungallur and a District Court started functioning from the same venue.

After 97 days of struggle, the ban was finally lifted and lower castes were allowed to enter the roads and temple premises.

== Aftermath ==
The success of this and similar movements led to the temples in Kochi being opened for all Hindus in 1948.
