= Muziris (spider) =

Scientific classification
- Kingdom: Animalia
- Phylum: Arthropoda
- Subphylum: Chelicerata
- Class: Arachnida
- Order: Araneae
- Infraorder: Araneomorphae
- Family: Salticidae
- Subfamily: Salticinae
- Genus: Muziris; Simon, 1901

Type species
- M. doleschalli (Thorell, 1878)

Species
- 7, see text

Genus of spiders

Muziris is a genus of jumping spiders that was first described by Eugène Louis Simon in 1901. The name is derived from Muziris, a lost city in India (presumed to be present day Kodungallur).

== Species ==
As of July 2019 It contains seven species spread over several island groups in the Pacific Ocean, with one species found in Australia. They are found in Indonesia, on Vanuatu, in Papua New Guinea, Australia, and Samoa:

- Muziris calvipalpis (L. Koch, 1867) – Samoa
- Muziris carinatus Simon, 1909 – Australia (Western Australia)
- Muziris doleschalli (Thorell, 1878) (type) – Indonesia (Ambon)
- Muziris epigynatus Strand, 1911 – Indonesia (Aru Is.)
- Muziris gracilipalpis Strand, 1911 – Indonesia (Aru Is.)
- Muziris leptochirus (Thorell, 1881) – New Guinea
- Muziris wiehlei Berland, 1938 – Vanuatu
