= Vadakkekara =

- Village
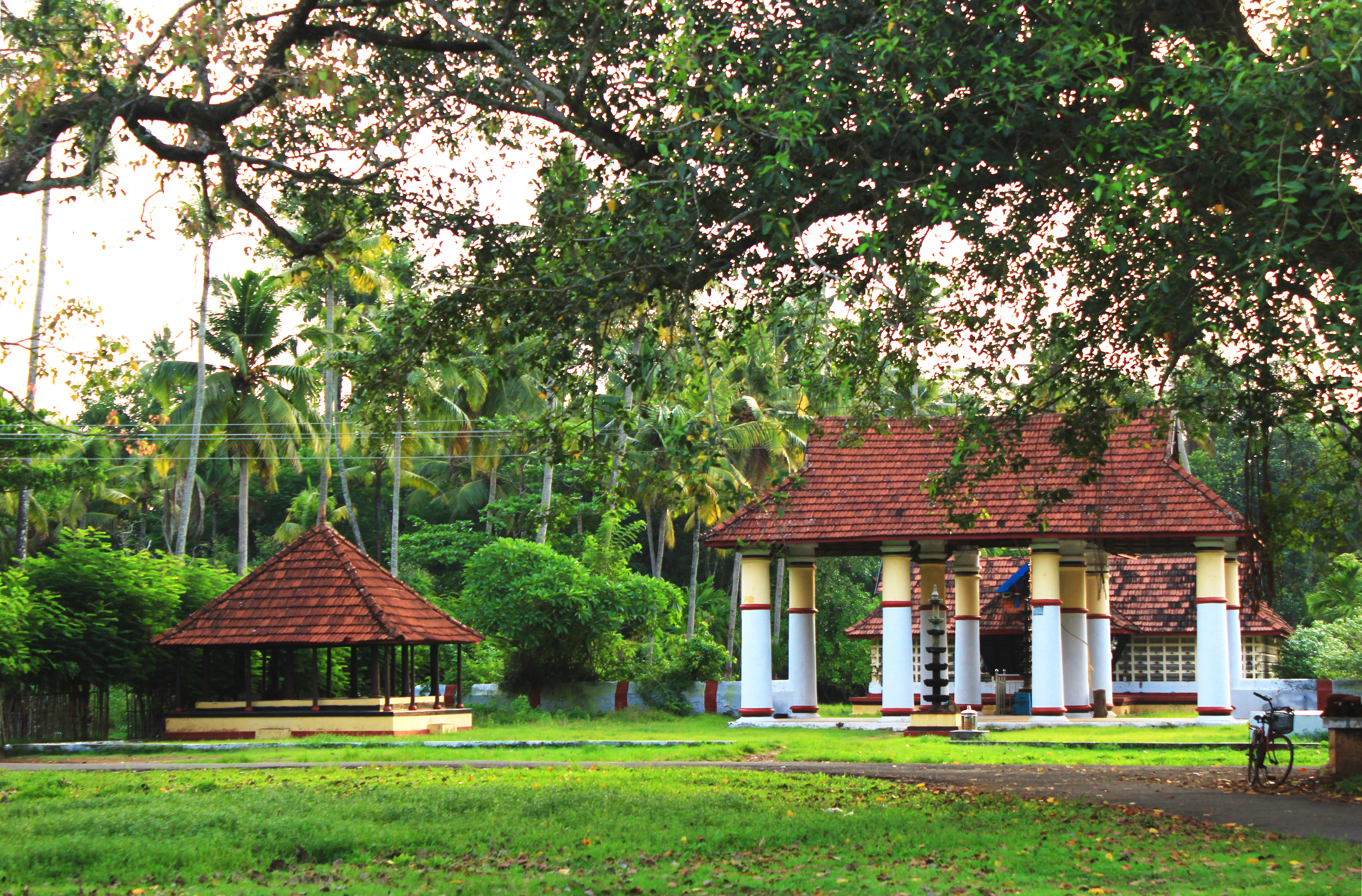

- Location in Kerala, India Vadakkekara (India)
- Coordinates: 10.173090°N 76.2096500°E
- Country: India
- State: Kerala
- District: Ernakulam

Government
  - Body: Vadakkekara

Area
  - Total: 9.32 km^{2} (3.60 sq mi)

Population (2011)
  - Total: 20,571
  - Density: 2,779/km^{2} (7,200/sq mi)

Languages
  - Official: Malayalam, English
- Time zone: UTC+5:30 (IST)
- Telephone code: 0484
- Vehicle registration: KL-42
- Nearest city: North Paravur
- Sex ratio: 1084 ♂/♀
- Literacy: 93.25%
- Lok Sabha constituency: Ernakulam
- Civic agency: Vadakkekara
- Website: [ lsgkerala.in/vadakkekkarapanchayat]]

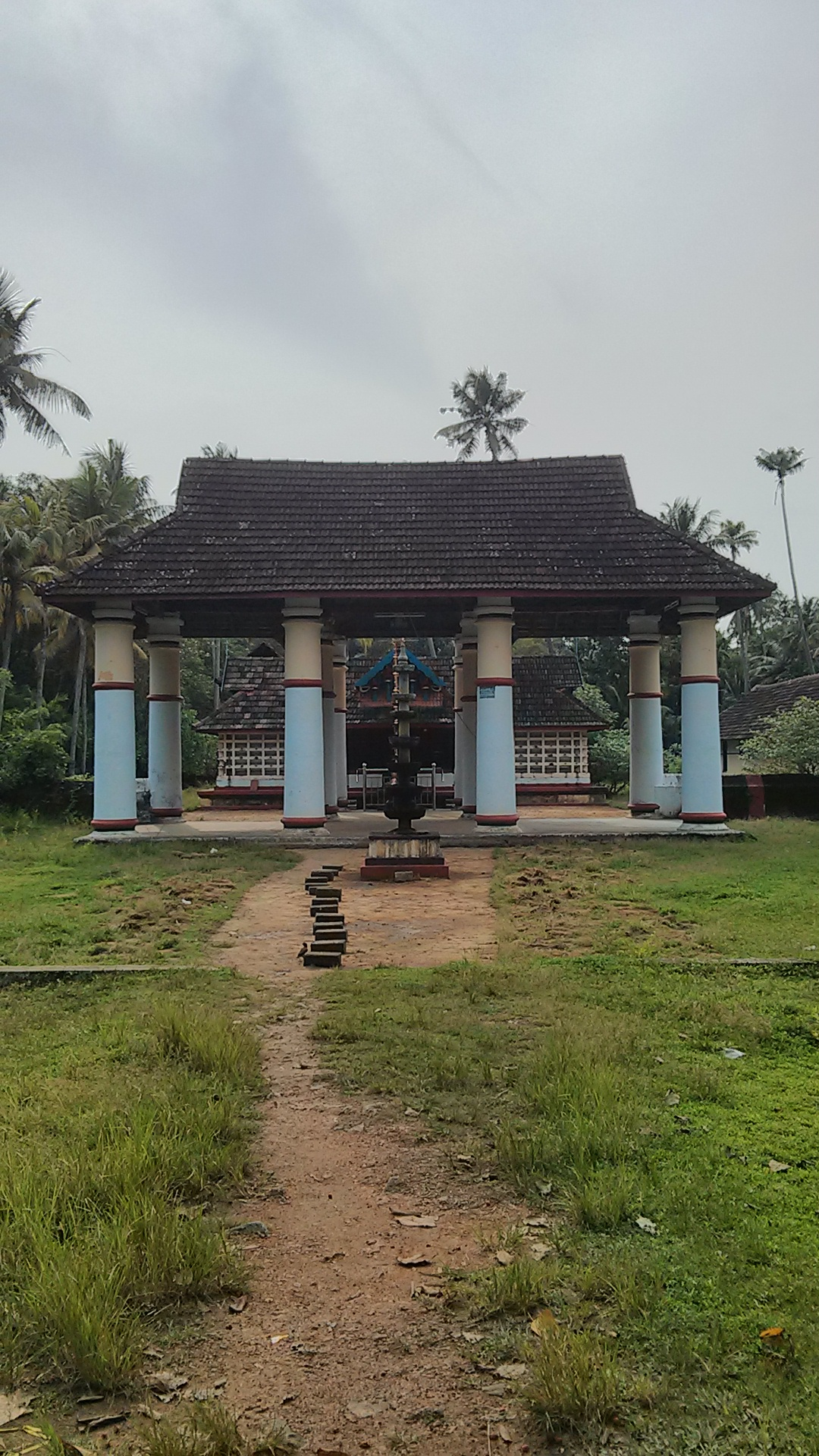
Puthiyakavu temple

Vadakkekara is a census town in the Paravur Taluk of Ernakulam District, Kerala, India. It is also a part of Vadakkekara Grama Panchayat. The town of Paravur is located 5 km away from this village. The main centre in this village is Moothakunnam. Vadakkekara is one of the earliest formed panchayats in the state. The cultural and historical place in Ernakulam District combines the parts of the early Muzaris. Maliankara is famous for being the landing place of St.Thomas.

== History ==
Vadakkekara (meaning: northern land) a panchayat situated in the north of Paravoor river. Vadakkekara consisted of Chittattukara, Pallipuram and Munambam. Vadakkekara was Kuttanad of Parur. Vadakkekara includes numerous islands and as the population increased the panchayat divided. Both British and Travancore has ruled here. British coins circulated here. Vadakkekara was the most important province under Parur Kingdom as it included Muziris where most of the Ships landed in the coasts of this panchayat. Kuriapilly Ferry connected Kottapuram Market. Vadakkekara was an assembly constituency.

== Economy ==
Important jobs are boat making, fishing, coconut trade, coir making, toddy tapping. Thuruthipuram is a minor market in this panchayat.

== Human Life ==
Hindu Ezhvas are the majority in population. Along with them, Muslims, Christians, Hindu Nairs, Dheevaras (settled mainly in Kunjithai, Chettikad, Malienkara) are there.

== Demographics ==
As of 2011 India census, Vadakkekara had a population of 20571 with 10065 males and 10506 females.

== Religious ==
- Moothakunnam Temple
- Vadakekara juma masjid
- Chakumarasery Temple
- Ramankulangara Bhagavathy Temple
- Kottuvallikad Temple
- Andippillikkav Bagavathy Temple
- Bhuvaneshvari Devi Temple, Thiruthipuram
- Sree Sastha Temple, Vavakadu
- Valathu devi Temple
- Unnimisiha Chapel, Madaplathuruth.
- St.Louis Church (Thuruthippuram)
- St. George Church (Madaplathuruth)
- St.Antony's church, Chettikkad
- Kottuvallikkad Alunkal Sree Badrakali Temple Fest

== Institutions ==
- SNM Higher Secondary School Moothakunnam.

HMDP Sabha formed in 1882 is the most old sangam. This resulted in the formation of several other institutions.

- SNM college, malinkara
- SNMIMT Engineering School, Malinkara
- HDPY Senior Secondary School, Andippillikkav

== Localities ==
Maliankara, Kottuvallikkad, Alamthurth Moothakunnam, Madaplathuruth, Andipillykavu, Thuruthipuram, Muruvanthuruth, Oravanthuruth, Kattathuruth, Paliathuruth, Vavakkad, Kunjithai, Chettikkad.

== Notable people ==
- Paravoor Bharathan
- Salim Kumar
