= Vadakkekara Gram Panchayat =

Town council in Ernakulam district, Kerala, India

Vadakkekara Gram Panchayat is a town council in the northern part of the Ernakulam district of Kerala, India. It is nestled in the Paravur Block Panchayat in Paravur Taluk. Panchayat is the northern border of the Ernakulam district.

== Origin ==
The name "Vadakkekkara" originates from this region in the former Kingdom of Cochin, and translates literally as “northern land”.

== Geography ==
Vadakkekara Panchayat is located near the Kodungallur estuary and bounded on three sides by rivers and a swampy area. The Ithikkara River emerges into the sea in the Vadakkekara Panchayat. Boundary areas have been established on the east by Chendamangalam, Puthenvelikara, and Chittatukara panchayats, and on the west by Pallipuram and Eriyad Panchayats. This panchayat is also the northern boundary of Ernakulam district.

== Economy ==
In 1020, there was a large export of prawns and dried fish from Vadakkekara Grama Panchayat. Up until the 1100s, coir was also manufactured and marketed through cooperatives.

Historically, fishing was the main occupation in this area on the many rivers and streams that provided waterways for the activity. Copra and coir were also produced here on an industrial basis. Additionally, sugarcane and toddy production reached an extensive scope with the toddy being sold in jars on boats, the alcohol being known as Tawaram.

Today, agriculture is also prominent in this area. The panchayat has implemented various projects to promote vegetable cultivation in local households.

A project initiated by the panchayat encouraged all households to launch vegetable cultivation during and after the COVID-19 lockdown and became a model for ensuring self-sufficiency in times of adversity.

== Educational Institutions ==
- Institute of Management and Technology, Maliankara
- Teacher's training college

== Statistics ==
Statistics
| District | Ernakulam |
| Block | Paravur |
| Area | 9.32 |
| Wards | 19 |
| Population | 31266 |
| Males | 15004 |
| Females | 16262 |

== Wards ==
There are 20 wards in Vadakkekara Panchayat:

- Andippillikkavu
- Chettikadu
- Kattathuruth
- Kottuvallikadu
- Kottuvallikadu West
- Kunjithai West
- Kunjithai East
- Madaplathuruth South
- Madaplathuruth East
- Madaplathuruth West
- Malyankara North
- Malyankara South
- Moothakunnam
- Moravian Thuruthu
- Oravanthuruthu
- Palyathuruthu
- Tharayilkavala
- Thuruthippuram
- Vavakkad
- Vavakkad East
