= Kottayil Kovilakam =

Kottayil Kovilakom Kovilakam Kottayilkovilakam
- town
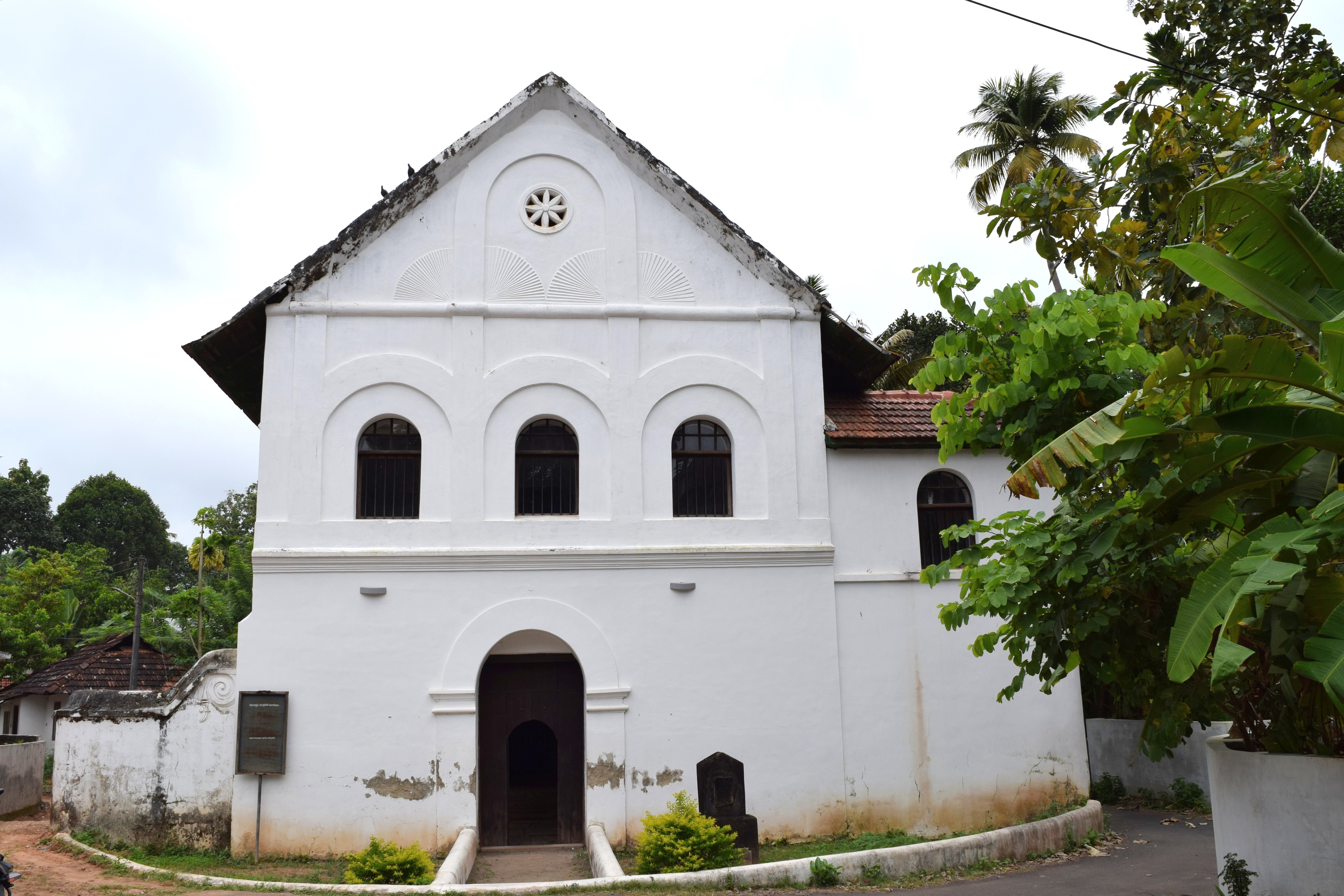
- Jewish Synagogue at Kottayil Kovilakam

- Location within Kerala Location within India
- Coordinates: 10.168°N 76.25°E
- Country: India
- State: Kerala
- District: Ernakulam

Languages
  - Official: Malayalam, English
- Time zone: UTC+5:30 (IST)
- Postal code: 684513
- Vehicle registration: KL-42
- Nearest city: North Paravur

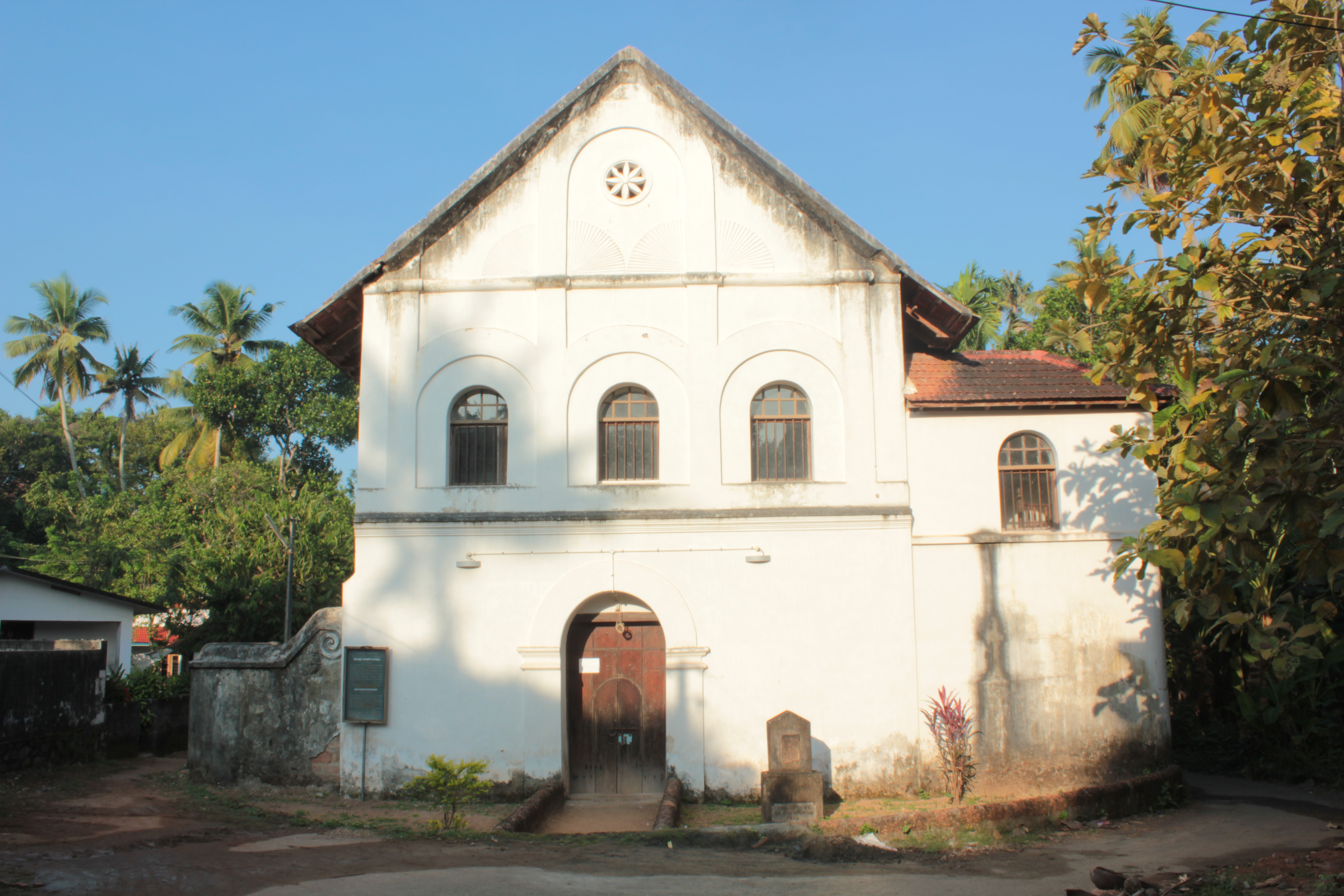
Jewish Synagogue in Kottayil Kovilakom

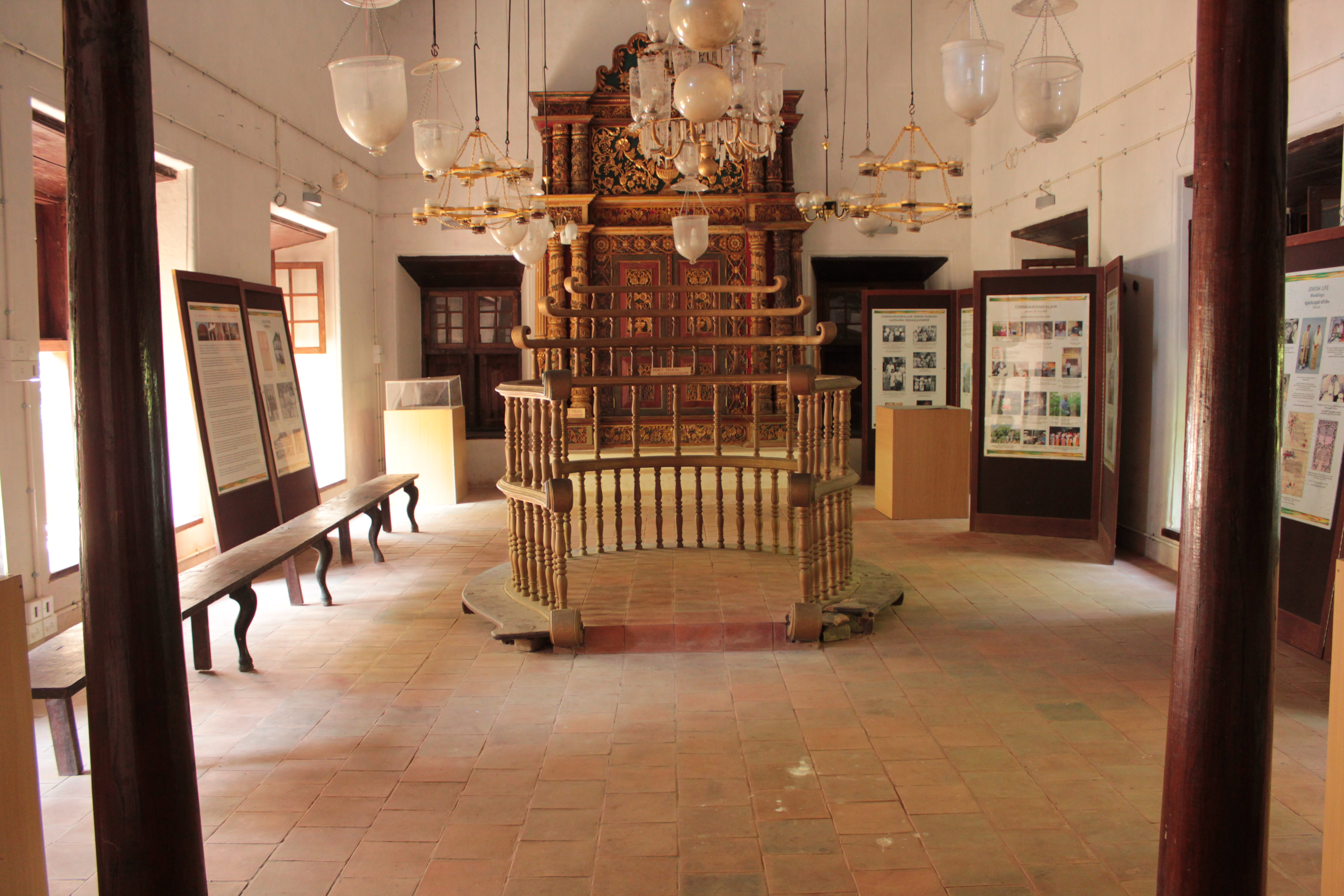
Inside Jewish Synagogue in Kottayil Kovilakom

Kottayil Kovilakam or Kottayil Kovilakom is a small village in Paravur taluk, Ernakulam district of Kerala state, near Kochi, south India.

On the banks of the confluence of three rivers is a small hill on top of which there is a Krishna temple, a Syrian church, a mosque and a Jewish synagogue depicting the cultural harmony of Kerala. All the above lie in 1 km circumference.

Kottayil Kovilakam at Chendamangalam, which was the seat of Kshatriya chieftains of Villarvattom is situated near the ancient Kunnathuthali temple. The Kovilakam/Palace was later on passed onto the Paliam Royal family of Chendamangalam, who were prime ministers and Raja under the Kochi Maharaja. Chendamangalam is an important center of hand loom weaving and coir manufacturing. The Kunnathuthali temples were constructed 400 years ago.
