= St. Sebastian's Church, Chittattukara =

St. Sebastian's Church
- St. Sebastian's Church
- Location: Chittattukara, Thrissur, Kerala, India
- Denomination: Syrian Catholic

History
- Status: Parish Church
- Dedication: St. Sebastian
- Consecrated: 1770

Administration
- District: Thrissur

St. Sebastian's Church, Chittattukara is a Syro-Malabar Catholic Church situated 22 kilometres to the north-west of Thrissur City, Kerala, India, and 5 kilometres south east of Guruvayur Town. It is 6 kilometres away from the historically important Palayur Church. Unlike most of Thrissur district, which was historically part of Cochin state, Chittatukara—along with Guruvayur formed part of the erstwhile Malabar district.

== History ==
Chittatukara village belongs to the Palayur area which is fortunate to be the cradle of the Kerala Christian Church. Chittatur or Chittatukara is a scenic village located five kilometres east of Palayur. In ancient times there were forests around Chittatukara. The names of the original places such as Thaikkad, Palakkad, Pandarakad and Nambazhikkad testify to this. The place is named Chittatukara because it is a land with forests "around it". This beautiful and comfortable village was the cohabitation of Brahmins in early times. That must be why for generations we have been believing that the Chittatukara region is also blessed with the touch of Thomas. The heritage and tradition of Chittatukara itself is unique. The Palayur Nasrani, the ancestral Kar of Chittatukara, used to conduct their religious practices depending on the Palayur church. In those "dark ages" when there was no means of transportation, it was difficult to cross fields, fields and ponds to attend the worship services at Palayur Church. This continued for centuries.

== Marcopolo and Muthyamapalli ==
As time went on, due to travel difficulties, people used to go to the Palayur church only for the Kada Day celebrations. Chittatukara where there are more believers A similar church of the cross was established in (Traditionally, it is believed that in the place of the ancient cross, a church of the cross was established in the year 1200 A.D.) At that time, the ancestors of Chittatukara used to meet frequently and conduct activities related to faith in the church of the cross. This Kurishupalli known as Annamma's "Muthe Mapalli" is mentioned in the travelogues of the Venetian world traveler Marco Polo (1275-1292) who visited Kerala in the 13th century. "There is a Christian church and market at Brahmakulam, four hours east of Palayur." (In ancient times the revenue village name of Chittatukara was Brahmakulam.) That is the Muthemapalli of Chittatukara Angadi as seen today, according to the foreign writer Pliny. Plini's first year travelogue mentions "Palura" and "Brahmagara". It refers to Palayur and Brahmakulam respectively.

== Chittatukara Parish is established ==
As time progressed, the number of believers increased in each land. In the course of time, churches were established in each place and the parish began to rotate. In this way, the ancestors of Chittatukara diligently established a parish in Chittatukara in 1770 without any damage to their faith tradition which they have preserved for more than 17 centuries. The believers who turned to parish from Palayur adopted Kurishupally (Muthyemapalli) in Angadi as their parish church. There was also a mosque near this mosque to study the scriptures and acquire literacy skills. The ancients say that it was used as a cemetery near this church. At that time all the believers in Pavaratti, Venmenadu, Cherumaruthayoor, Poovathur, Ela Valli, Peruvallur, Nambazhikkad etc. were under Chittatukara Parish Church. There were more than a thousand houses as parishioners.

== A new church is built ==
Due to the increase in population in the parish and lack of adequate facilities in the church, in 1792 Alathupoovvassery bought a plot of land from Kothakandan and Thambi and established a church. built (It can be seen in Chittatur Chepets) It is not a church as seen today. That church was located just south of the present church

(The area where the south hall of the present church is extended is the place where the church stood at that time). The cemetery was right next to the church and later after the completion of the current Portugal-style large church (the large church was completed in 1810) the small church began to be used as a cemetery church. After the church case in 1874 (Melussheeshma), this church started to decay and was demolished. The present day cemetery is in Kanjirathingal Parambam, which was purchased in 1908. There was also a cemetery. The present cemetery was renovated in 1962 as a Jubilee memorial of the Darshan Sabha.

The paramp facing west next to the paramp given by the Chittatukara church is a manaparamp with the basic name and title of Cherusseryparamp. It is said that there are many reliable evidences that after coming to the church, these people found it difficult to stay there and soon they left Mepadi.

== Chittatukara Anadi is formed ==
Chittatukara was a commercial center since ancient times. The people within ten hours depended on Chittatukara for raw food. Finger-like houses and peedikas in front of each house are a feature of Chittatukara Angadi even today. But it was not the kind of market that you see today. It was an angadi (market) that was gathered only for the purpose of trade. Most of the people lived outside the market. The main occupations were agriculture, petty trading and chattel. When Kurishupalli was established, many believers started living near the market. The market seen today must have been built in the late 17th century.

The financial condition of the church also improved with the increase in people's love and faith towards the church. In 1794, Alathur Puvvassery Korachapan and Thambi bought the northern part of the land adjacent to the church yard. In 1817, Cherukulangare Param and in 1840, Kodumpata Param were bought from the Tianmars themselves. In 1834, the market place east of Kurishupalli was transferred from Thambimar. The entire large bazaar became the birth of the church along with what was received as an offering to the church. Those who stayed there became the tenants of the church. As a result of long efforts, the present Thekeangadi location (Kanjirathi Nkal Paramb) got the name of the church in 1908 from Attayur - Painkanikulam Devaswat. At that time, all the festival processions were conducted through the church's own premises.

== Chapels ==
There are seven chapels under the parish:

1. Muthyema Chapel
2. Velankanni Matha Chapel
3. St Antony's Chapel (Kakkassery East)
4. Calvary Chapel
5. The Western Chapel
6. Chakkanthara Chapel (Kakkassery North)
7. Kadavalloor Chapel

== Major celebrations ==
The major festival celebrated here is the feast of St. Sebastian known as "Kambidi Thirunnal" on 6 and 7 January. The celebration begins on 4 January. The 2 km Angadi road is decorated with pindis and lights. The main attraction of the feast is the fireworks. The main firework is on 6 and 7 January. Small fireworks are conducted on 4 and 5.
