= Chittatukara =

- Village
- Location in Kerala, India Chittatukara (India)
- Coordinates: 10.571844°N 76.073319°E
- Country: India
- State: Kerala
- District: Ernakulam

Government
  - Body: Chittattukara

Area
  - Total: 9.46 km^{2} (3.65 sq mi)

Population
  - Total: 25,320
  - Density: 2,677/km^{2} (6,930/sq mi)

Languages
  - Official: Malayalam, English
- Time zone: UTC+5:30 (IST)
- Telephone code: 0484
- Vehicle registration: KL-42
- Nearest city: North Paravur
- Sex ratio: 1068 ♂/♀
- Literacy: 92.37%
- Lok Sabha constituency: Ernakulam
- Civic agency: Chittattukara
- Climate: moderate (Köppen)

Chittattukara is a census town and panchayat in Paravur Taluk of Ernakulam District, Kerala. Paravur town is situated close to this village, just 2 km. The most ancient and trade centre Pashnam is located at Pattanam, a small area in this village. Many historic monuments were founded out from this area.

== History ==
Chittattukara was carved out from Vadakkekara village union. The panchayat was full of lush green trees and canals. People settled here according to the caste hierarchy.

== Religion ==
Temples

- Mannam Subrahmanya temple (Biggest Kavadi in District)
- Makkanayi Siva Temple
- Neendoor Temple
- Kalarikkal Temple
- Guruthippadam Temple, Parayakad
- Neeleswaram Mahadeva Temple, Pttanam, North Paravoor
- Thrikkeparambu bhagavathi temple
- Chekuthanthara Panikarachan Badrakaali Devi Temple, Pooyappilly, North Paravur

Mosques

- Jaram
- Neendor Chittatukara Juma Masjid
- Parappuram Juma Masjid

Churches

- St. Sebastian's Church

== See also ==
- Paravur Taluk
- Ernakulam District
