= Pattanam =

- Village
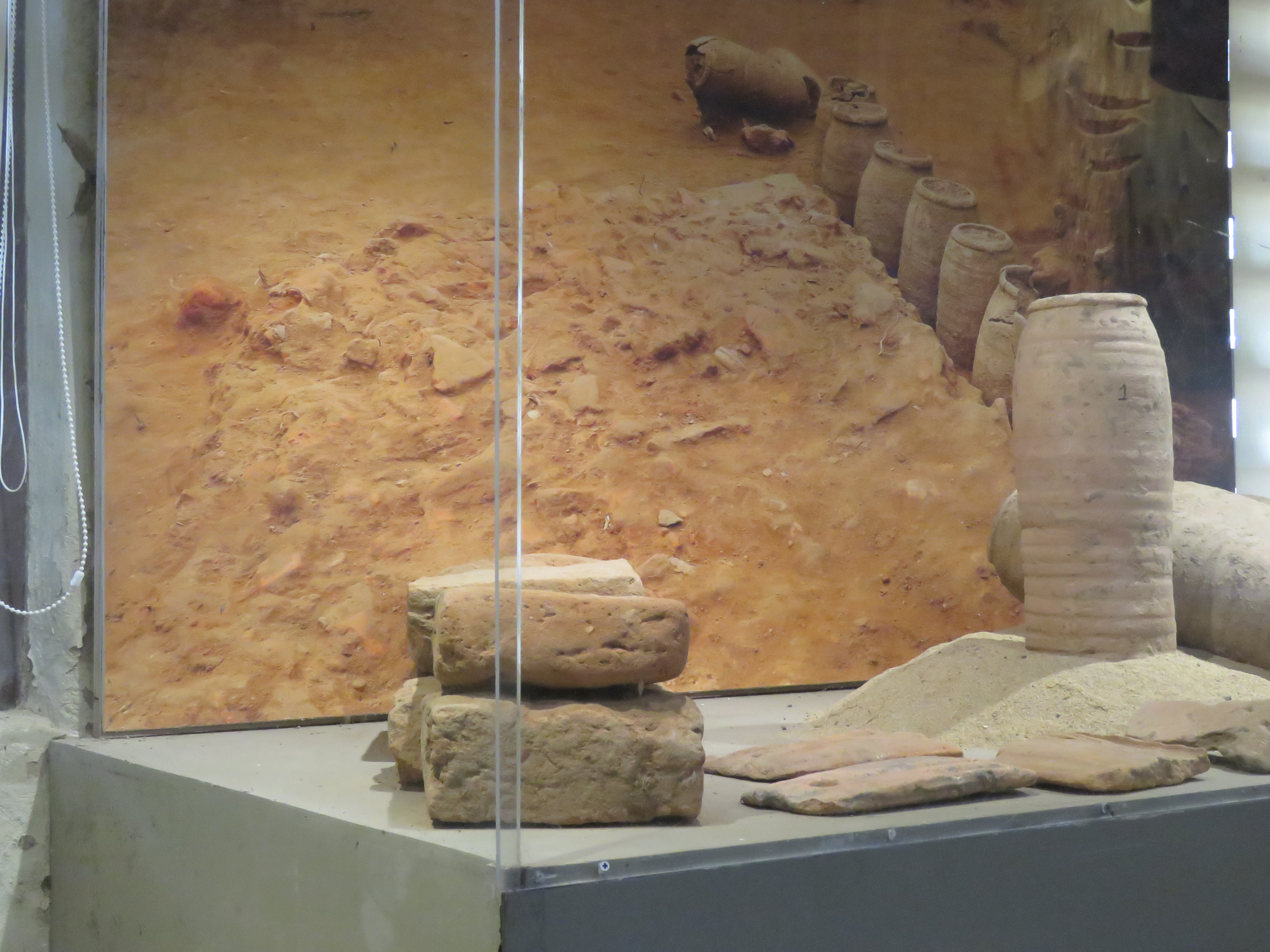
- Site Museum, Pattanam

- Location in Kerala, India Pattanam (India)
- Coordinates: 10.15654°N 76.208982°E
- Country: India
- State: Kerala
- District: Ernakulam
- Taluk: Paravur taluk

Government
  - Body: Chittattukara Panchayat

Languages
  - Official: Malayalam; English
- Time zone: UTC+5:30 (IST)
- PIN: 683 522
- Telephone Code: 0484
- Vehicle registration: KL-42
- Nearest Municipal Corporation: Kochi
- Lok Sabha Constituency: Ernakulam
- Civic Agency: Chittattukara Panchayat
- Climate: Tropical (Köppen)

Pattanam (Malayalam: [pɐʈːɐɳɐm]) is a village located in Paravur taluk, Ernakulam district, in the southern Indian state of Kerala. It is situated 2–3 km northwest of North Paravur, 3 km west of Chendamangalam, and 30 km north of Kochi (Cochin). It is located about 4 km inland from the coast. The Periyar flows roughly 5 km to the north, while a stream, the Paravur Thodu, runs about 1 km to the south.

Pattanam has been excavated by archaeologists and revealed to be an important port in ancient times. It is believed to correspond to the port of Muziris (Muchiri), as mentioned in various Greco-Roman texts. Most of the artifacts recovered from Pattanam are now displayed in the site museum at Pattanam.

== Archaeological excavations ==
It is estimated that the Pattanam archaeological mound (10°09.434’N; 76°12.587’E) covers about 45 hectares (~111 acres). Owing to habitation activities, it is a highly disturbed site. Only a small portion has been excavated (~1%), while some parts have been partially or completely destroyed due to construction and sand quarrying.

Between 2007 and 2015, the Kerala Council for Historical Research (KCHR) carried out nine seasons of explorations and excavations at Pattanam (a total of sixty-one trenches were excavated).

=== Discoveries from Pattanam ===
The excavations uncovered a diverse range of remains, offering important insights into the Malabar Coast's interactions with the Mediterranean, the Middle East, Southeast Asia, and China. The majority of the excavated objects date to the Early Historic period of south Indian or Kerala history, spanning from c. 3rd century BCE to the 5th century CE.

- Structural evidence includes a wharf, a 6-metre dugout canoe crafted from anjili wood, and Teak-wood mooring bollards. The wharf was made of Laterite granules, lime, and Clay and had a brick lining (made of burnt bricks).
- The ceramic assemblage was overwhelmingly dominated by south Asian wares (Black and Red Ware, Russet Coated Painted Ware, Indian Rouletted Ware, and 'Type 10' fine grey ware). Alongside these, a diverse array of imported ceramics attests to extensive maritime trade networks from the early historic period, connecting the site with the Mediterranean world, the Middle East, and China.
- Contact with the Mediterranean is evidenced by amphora sherds and terra sigillata fragments, as well as carnelian intaglios (depicting the goddess Tyche/Fortuna and a leaping lion), cameo blanks made from semi-precious stones, and fragments of Roman glass. Additional foreign imports include Turquoise glazed Pottery from Southern Iran and torpedo jars of Mesopotamia.

The material culture recovered at Pattanam encompassed beads crafted from a variety of semi-precious stones/glass, granite grinding implements, stone weights, and Terracotta objects. In addition, artefacts fashioned from metals — including Iron, Copper, Lead, and Gold (such as a miniature axe pendant/ornament) — were also documented. In addition, square copper coins of the Chera dynasty, bearing the bow-and-arrow insignia, have been unearthed at the site. Among the notable discoveries were a broken rim inscribed with Brahmi script.

The site yielded botanical remains such as Black pepper, Cardamom, and frankincense, alongside faunal remains consisting of bone fragments and teeth. Chinese ceramics — comprising blue-and-white, white-glazed, and brown-glazed porcelain — indicate commercial interactions with East Asia during the Early Modern to Modern period.

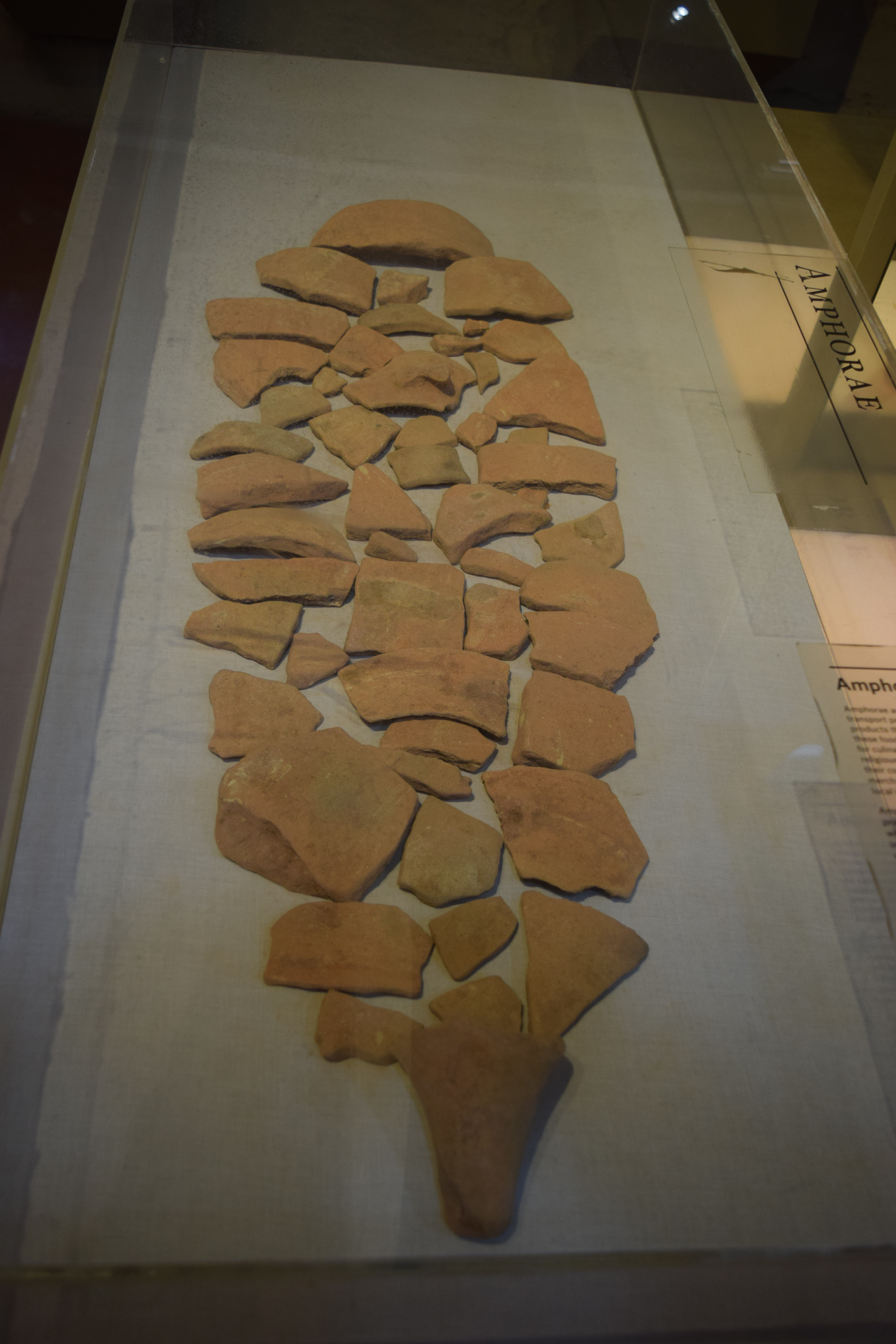
Amphorae sherds, Pattanam

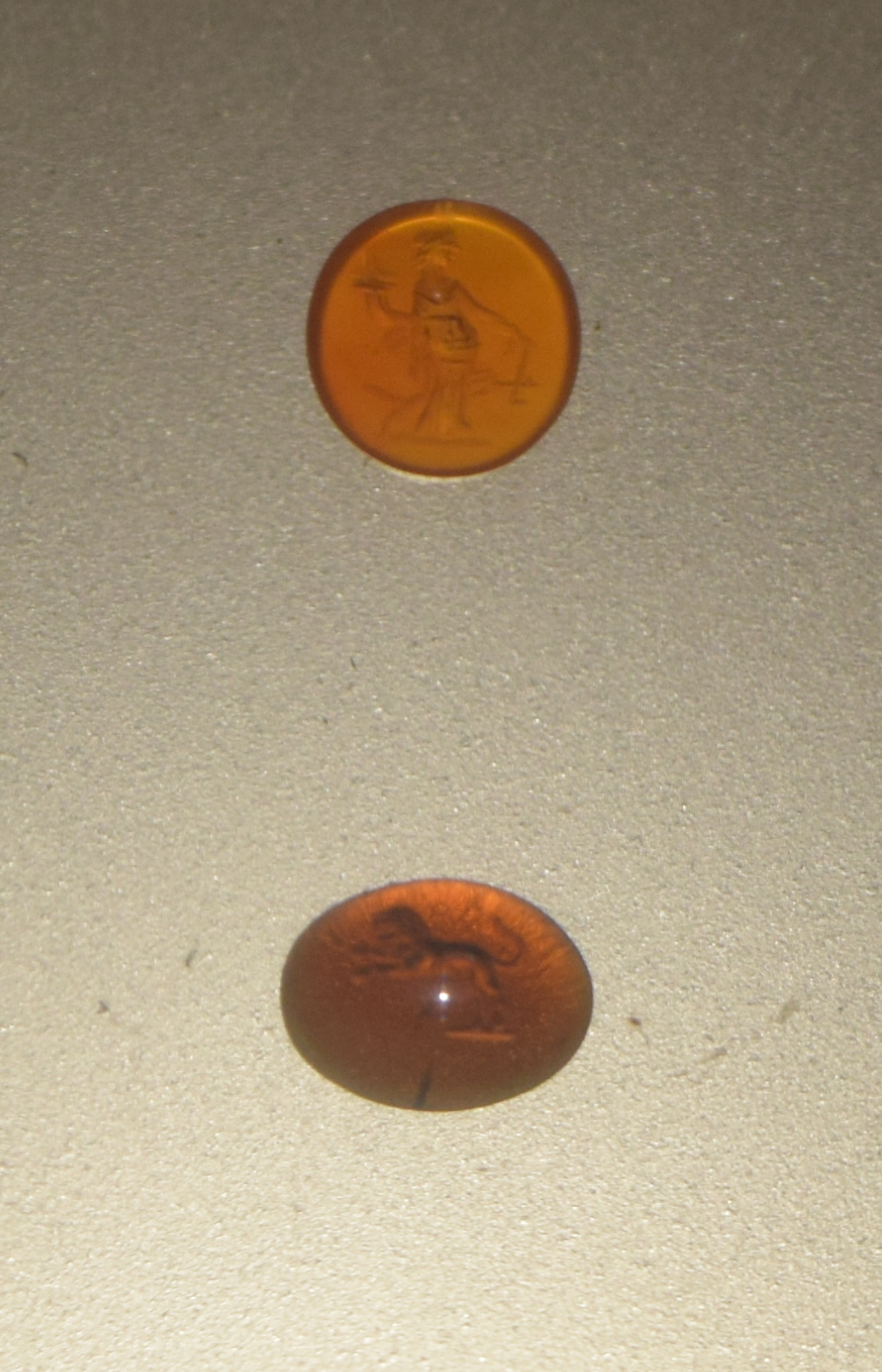
Carnelian intaglios, Pattanam

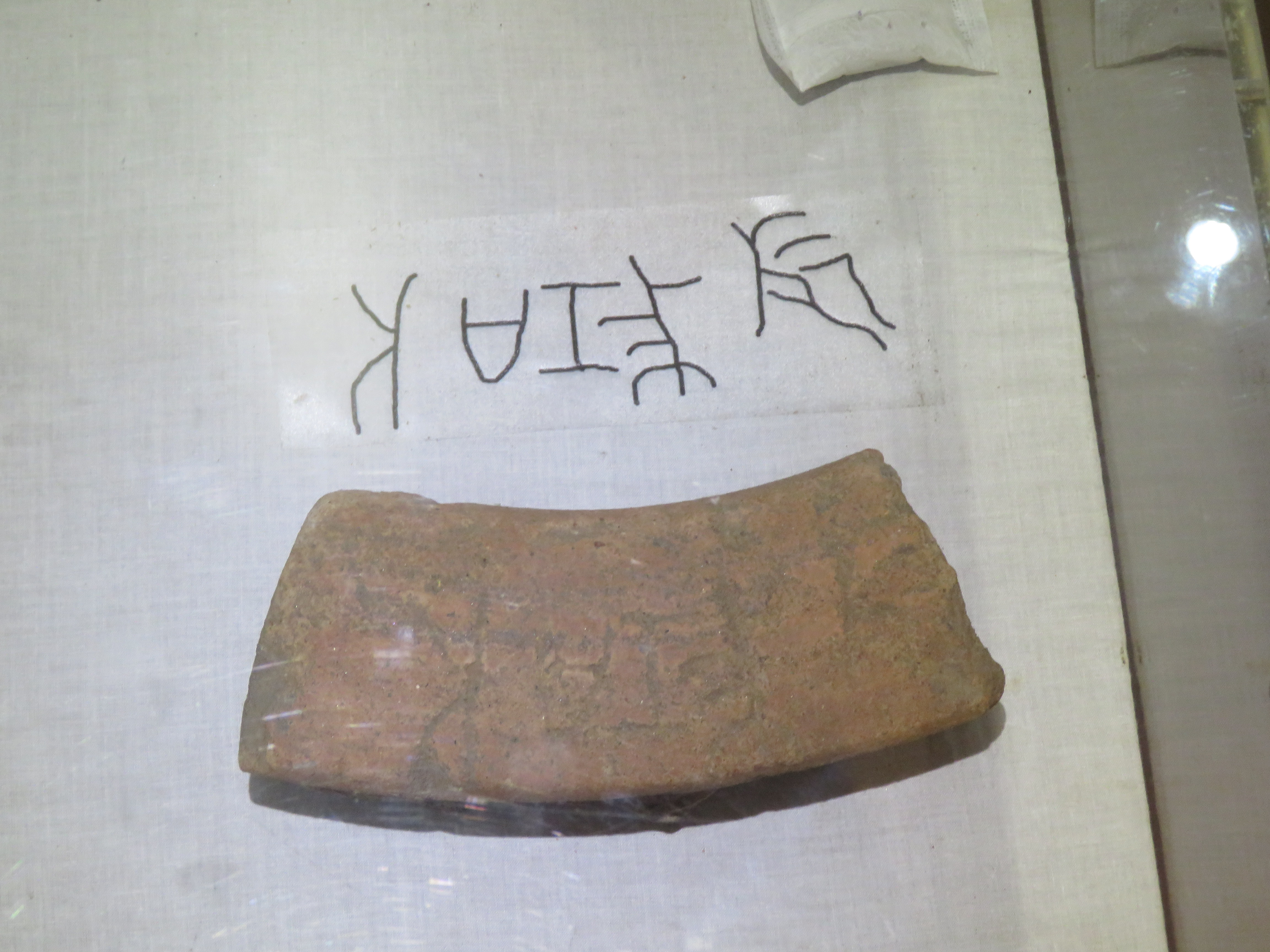
Tamil-Brahmi Inscription, Pattanam

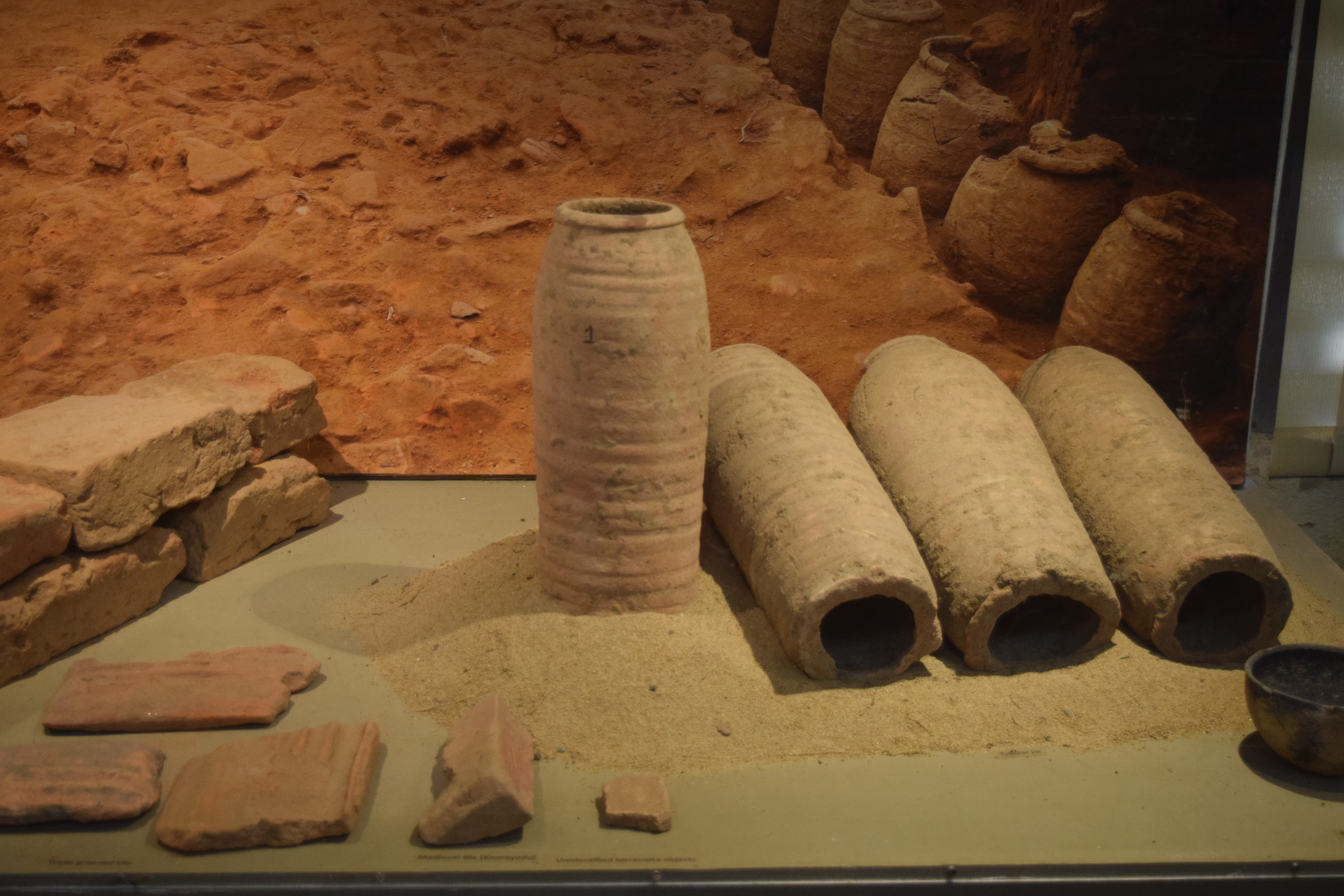
Tubular jars, Pattanam

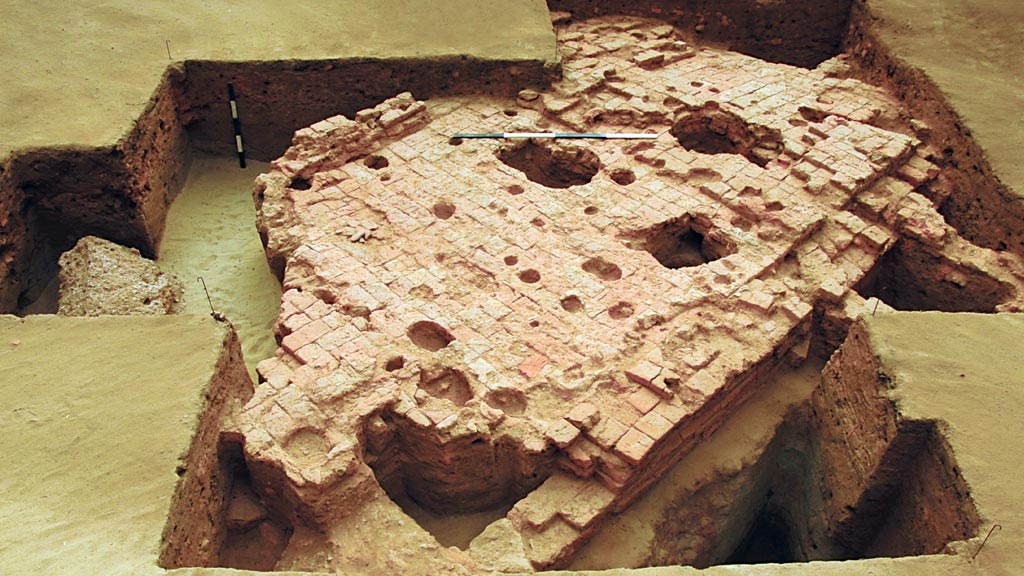
Wharf, Pattanam

=== Criticisms ===
The identification of present-day Pattanam with the legendary port of Muziris — celebrated in several Greco-Roman sources as one of the premier Indian Ocean centres of the spice trade — has been questioned by some scholars.

An alternative view places Muziris at Kodungallur, located north of Pattanam. Arguments supporting this include its historical role as a medieval port or capital and the reference to the port of "Muyirikkode" in the Jewish Copper Plates. In addition, the absence of comparable excavations at other sites in Kerala, such as Kodungallur, is considered a significant gap in the debate.

== See also ==
- North Paravur
- Thiruvanchikulam
- Ernakulam District
- Paravur Taluk
- Kochi
- Kodungallur
