= Paliath Achan =

Name given to the male members of the Paliam royal family

Paliath Achan or Paliyath Achan is the name given to the male members of the Paliam family, a Nair Menon family from the Indian state of Kerala who ruled over Chendamangalam, Vypin, parts of Thrissur regions as ministers and chieftains, under the erstwhile Kingdom of cochin. The family had palaces and forts in these regions but their primary residence remained in Chendamangalam. The Paliath Achans were given the role of hereditary Prime ministership of the Kingdom of Cochin by the Kochi Maharajah.

== Overview ==
The Paliath Achans were originally Nairs who held the title 'Menon,' a scribal title. By the 1590s, their fortunes began to spiral when the ruler bestowed upon them the seat of a deceased chieftain, and in 1622, a portion of Vypin Island was ceded to them. This was followed by the hereditary premiership of Cochin and the acquisition of power. As Ravi Achan puts it, 'We were not born lords. We were made lords.' Later generations became wealthier than the Maharajas of Cochin.

The Paliath Achans were hereditary prime ministers to the Rajah of Kingdom of Cochin (Kerala) from 1632 to 1809 and second only to the Rajah in power and wealth in the central Cochin area during that period.

== Paliam Palace ==
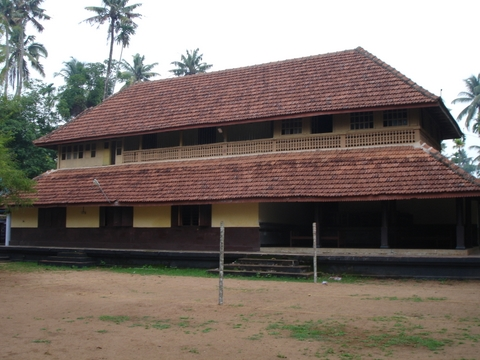
The Paliam Naalukettu

The main family tharavadu (Naalukettu) is approximately 450 years old. The Kovilakam (palace) houses a large number of artefacts including ancient documents, religious sacraments, swords, rifles, and gifts brought by foreign dignitaries. Several other buildings, like the Paliath Achan's Kovilakam (which was built by the Dutch, and also known as the Dutch palace) exist adjacent to the tharavadu. The buildings in the area date anywhere from 60 to 300 years.

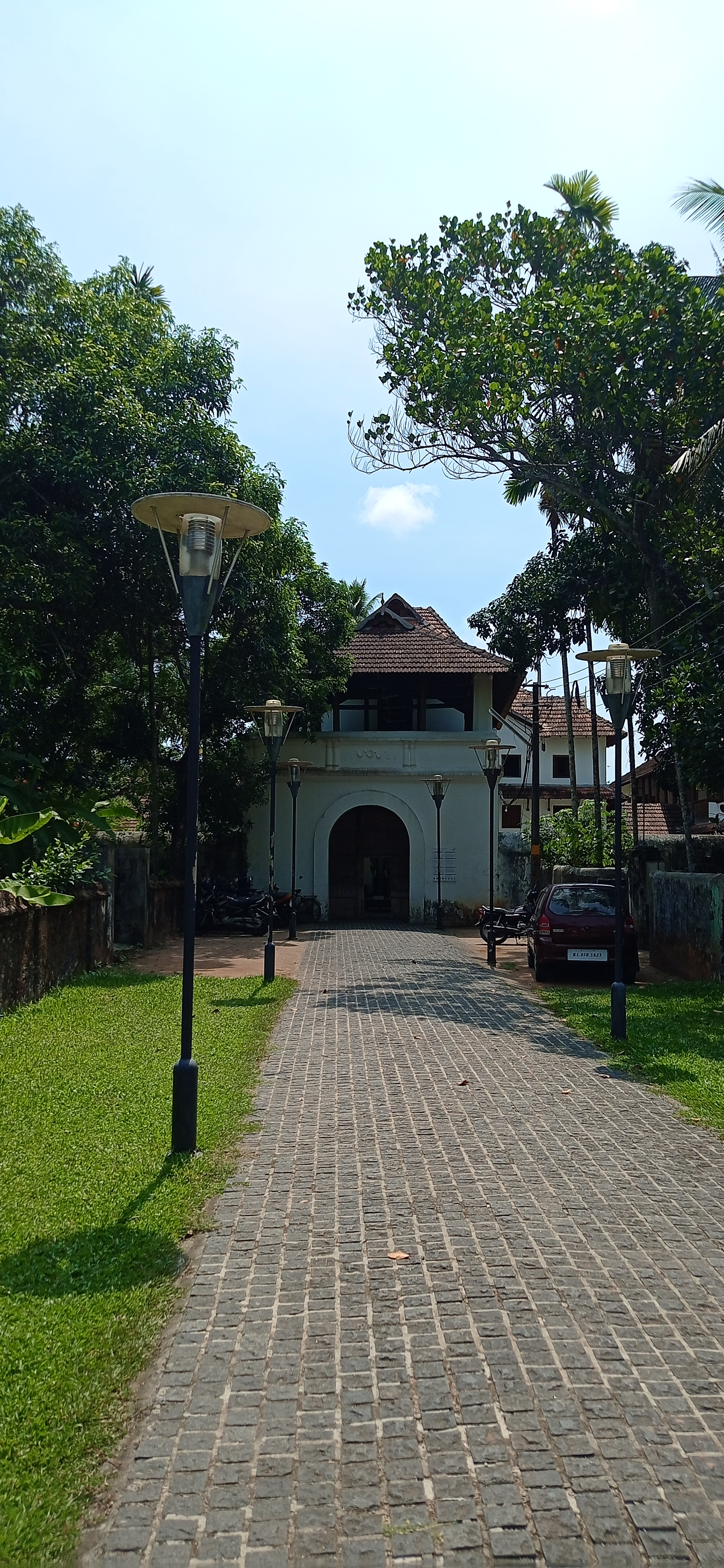
Paliam Palace

Both the Paliam Palace and Naalukettu are recognized as archaeological monuments by the Government of India and the State of Kerala, and both buildings are currently museums under the Muziris Project according to a joint ownership and maintenance agreement with the Paliam family, and the family still reserves their use for private functions and ceremonies, during which time the buildings are not open to the public.

== Significance in Kerala history ==
The Zamorin invaded Cochin in 1757. Due to the diplomatic efforts of the Paliath Achan, the Kingdom of Cochin was saved. During Hyder Ali's conquest of the south of India in 1776, the Paliath Achan was able to effect a treaty between Hyder Ali and the Cochin Raja.

In 1808, the British East India Company was trying to persuade the Raja of Kochi's men to defect their side. They had succeeded in getting the support of Nadavarambu Kunhikrishna Menon. Paliath Govindan Achan was provoked by this. He took with him 600 Nair soldiers and attacked the headquarters of Colonel Macaulay, the local British Resident, who was forced to flee. Following the attack, Paliath Achan and his men broke open the local jails and set free any prisoners found inside. The Paliath Achan later joined the Travancore alliance of Velu Thampi Dalawa. During 1809 and 1810, Paliath Achan, allied with Velu Thampi Dalawa, fought the British on Travancore soil. Achan engaged the British East India Company troops in battle, and was defeated. After this defeat, Achan surrendered to the British East India Company and defected to their side in the conflict. After the rebellion, the British authorities deported him to Madras, where he was imprisoned at Fort St. George for 12 years. He was then taken to Bombay and remained a prisoner there for 13 years, finally dying at Benares 1832. Paliath Govindan Achan was the last Paliath Achan to occupy the position of Prime Minister in the Kingdom of Cochin.

Another notable Paliath Achan includes Komi Achan I. Komi Achan I resisted the attempts by the Portuguese to impose their power on the Cochin Family. He allied himself with the Dutch, travelling to Colombo to sign a treaty with them. He also supported the Dutch against the Portuguese. In recognition of his efforts, the Dutch built him a palace (the Kovilakam) at Chendamangalam.

Between 1730 and 1740 the status of the Cochin kingdom dwindled due to the consolidation of power in Travancore under Marthanda Varma combined with the waning influence of the Dutch and a large-scale invasion by the Zamorin from the north. Paliath Komi Achan was able to effect a treaty between the Cochin and Travancore Kingdoms. This treaty facilitated the defeat of the Zamorin.

The Chendamangalam Jews sing "The Song of Paliathachan" in which they mention the mention "Nayar Noblemen" who bestowed upon the Jews "gifts and books to all those who come, and titles to foreigners". In the Vishnuvilasam Hamsappattu, a Malayalam poem about the life of Vishnu (as spoken by a swan), the poet (Kunjan Nambiar) makes a reference to a Paliath Achan named Kuberan:

ശ്രീ കുബേരാഖ്യഗനം പാലിയാധീഷരന്റേ
ശ്രീ കുലാഡംബരം ചെമ്മേ വരൊത്തൊന്ന
ശ്രീ കാന്തദേവന്‍ ജയന്താലയേശ്വരന്‍
ശ്രീ കണ്ഠ്സേവിതന്‍ ശ്രീന്യസിംഹാക്യതി
ശ്രേയസ്സു നല്‍കും നിനക്കിന്നു ഹംസമേ!

SrI kubErAkhyaganam pAliyAdhIsharantE
SrI kulADambaram chemmE varoththonna
SrI kAnthadEvan jayanthAlayEaSvaran
SrI kantEsavithan SrInyusimhAkruthi
SrEyassu nalkum ninakkinnu hamsamE!

Kochu Sankaran Muthat of Vatakketam in Triprayar was a student of Manorama Thampuratti of Calicut. He lived at Paliam, teaching students there. He wrote a commentary named Prasika, on the eleventh book of the Bhagavad Gita, based on earlier commentaries of his student, Paliath Achan:

നിജശിഷ്യ പാലിയേശ-
പ്രാര്‍ത്ഥനയാ ശങ്കരഖ്യ ശിവവിപ്ര:
ദാഗവതൈകാദശഗാ:
പ്രാക്തനവിവ്യതീ: സമുച്ചിനോമ്യദ്യ

nijaSishya pAliyESa-
prArththhanayA Sankarakhya Sivavipraha
dAgavathaikAdaSagAha
prAkthanavivyathIha samuchchinOmyadya

The Paliam family had a rich collection of manuscripts in Sanskrit and Malayalam. At the time of family partition, this collection was donated to the Kerala University Manuscript Library and the Tripunithura.

=== Paliam Satyagraham ===
Paliam satyagraha was a movement in 1947–48 to allow entry for Hindus of lower castes in the roads surrounding the Paliam family home in Chendamangalam and the temples. The success of this and similar movements led to the temples in Kochi being opened for all Hindus in 1948.

== See also ==
- History of Kerala
- History of Kochi
- Cochin Royal Family
- Nair
