= Muziris =

Ancient south Indian port

- Muciṟi
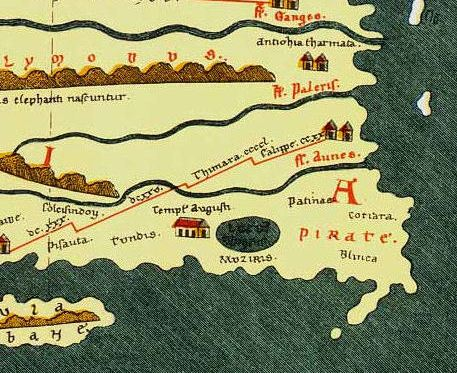
- Muziris, as shown at the bottom of the copy of the 4th-century map Tabula Peutingeriana.

- Location within India
- Type: Port/Urban Settlement
- Location: Pattanam, Ernakulam district (?)
- Region: Chera Kingdom (Malabar Coast)

Muciṟi (Tamil: [musiri], Old Tamil: Muciṟi; Malayalam: [mutːʃiri]), also Muchiri, Classical Graeco-Roman toponym Muziris/Mouziris (Ancient Greek: Μουζιρίς), was an ancient port and urban centre on the Malabar Coast, southern India. It was located near the mouth of the Periyar River in the Chera country of Tamilakam.

Muziris is celebrated in several ancient Tamil sources (the Sangam Literature or the early Tamil poems) and Graeco-Roman Classical texts, such as the Periplus and the writings of Pliny the Elder, especially for its importance in the Indian Ocean spice trade with the Middle East and the Mediterranean world. A 2nd-century papyrus notably describes a cargo loan arrangement between merchants of Alexandria (Egypt) and Muziris, detailing goods loaded onto a ship at Muziris for trade. For many centuries Muziris remained an important port in southern India, presumably until the devastating "floods" of the Periyar River in 1341 CE. It has also been speculated that Muziris may be identical with the medieval "Muyirikode" (Kodungallur) near the Periyar estuary.

The exact location of the ancient port has long been a matter of dispute among historians and archaeologists. Earlier, it was believed to have been located in the region around Kodungallur (Thrissur) in the state of Kerala. Excavations conducted since 2007 at Pattanam, near North Paravur (Ernakulam) in Kerala, have led some experts to favour that location.

Names, routes and locations of the Periplus of the Erythraean Sea (1st century AD)

== Etymology ==
The derivation of the name Muziris is said to be from the native name of the port, Mucciṟi, the Old Tamil word for cleft lip, and indeed the Periyar does branch into two like a cleft lip. Muziris is frequently referred to as Muciṟi in Sangam poems such as Akananuru (Song 149, composed by Erukkattur Tayankannanar) , Purananuru (Song 343, composed by Paranar), Pathitrupathu etc. Muracippaṭṭaṇam in the Sanskrit epic Ramayana, and Muyiṟikkōṭŭ in the Jewish copper plate of an 11th-century Chera ruler.

== Location ==
Earlier, Muziris was identified with the region around Mangalore in the southwest of the state of Karnataka. A later hypothesis was that Muziris was situated around present-day Kodungallur, a town and taluk (subdivision) in the Thrissur district of the state of Kerala; and indeed Kodungallur figures prominently in South Indian history as a hub of the Chera rulers from the second Chola period .

However, when excavations were conducted in 2006–2007 in the village of Pattanam between Kodungallur and North Paravoor (see below) by the Kerala Council for Historical Research (KCHR), an autonomous institution outsourced by the Kerala State Department of Archaeology, it was announced that the lost port of Muziris had been found, thus starting a new hypothesis. This identification of Pattanam as Muziris also sparked controversy among historians.

== Trade ==
Muziris was a key to trade interactions between South India and Persia, the Middle East, North Africa, and the Graeco-Roman Mediterranean region. Pliny the Elder, in his Natural History, hailed Muziris as "the first emporium of India". Although trade between India and Rome declined from the 5th century AD, Muziris attracted the attention of others—particularly the Persians, Chinese and Arabs.

The important known exports from Muziris were spices (such as black pepper and malabathron); semi-precious stones (such as beryl); pearls, diamonds, and sapphires; ivory; Chinese silk; Gangetic spikenard and tortoise shells. Roman navigators brought gold coins; peridots; thin clothing; figured linens and multicoloured textiles; sulfide of antimony, copper, tin, lead and coral; raw glass; wine; and realgar and orpiment.

== Early descriptions ==
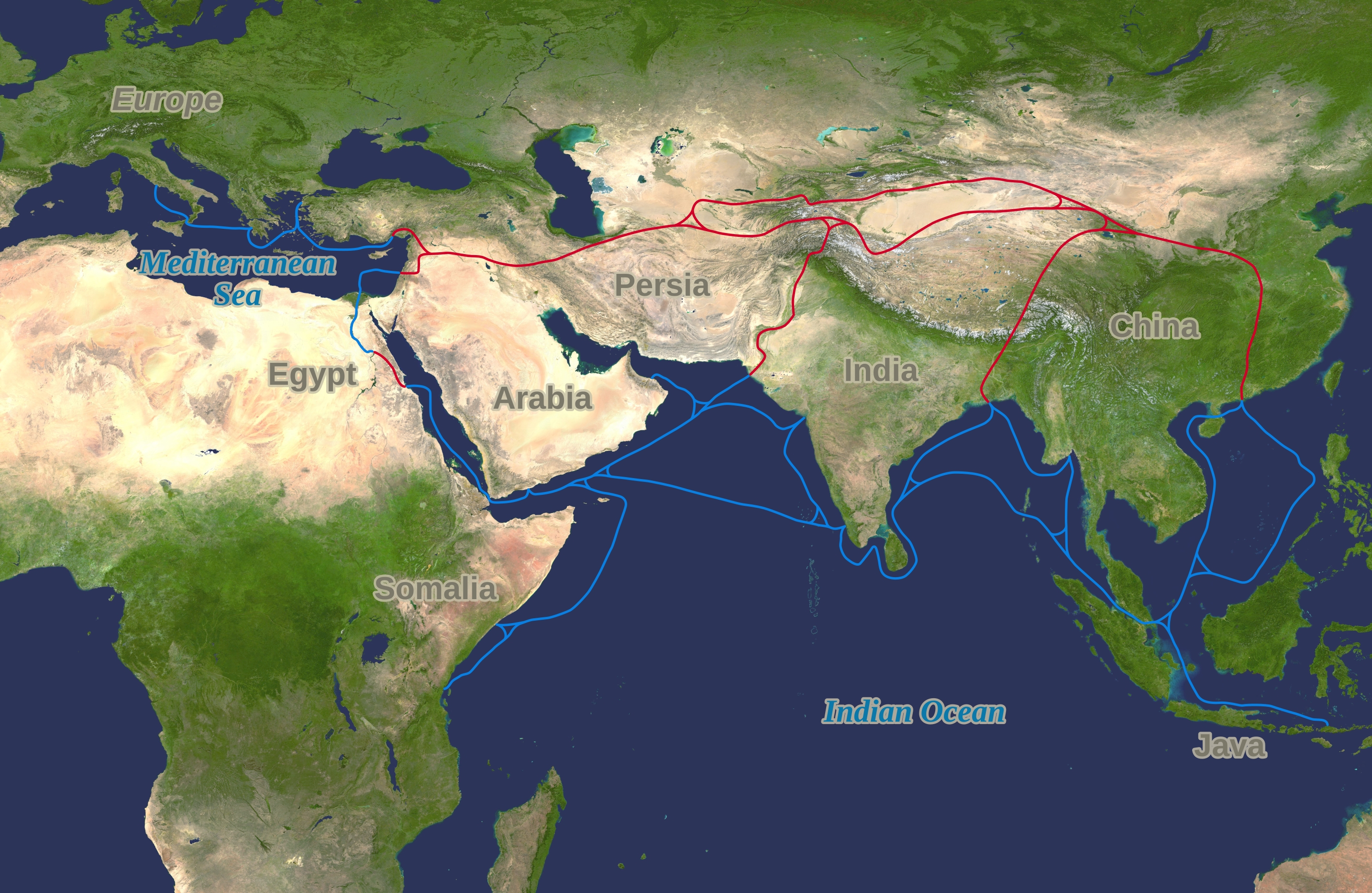
The Silk Road, a group of ancient trade routes that, linking east and west, carried goods and ideas between the two great civilizations of Rome and China. The land routes are shown in red, the maritime routes in blue.

=== Sangam literature ===
Muziris is mentioned in the classical Sangam literature in Tamil, spanning a period primarily from 100 BC to 250 AD though perhaps a little earlier as well as later. For instance, in the Akaṉaṉūṟu—one of the anthologies of early Tamil bardic poems in the Eṭṭuttokai—the following is found in poem number 149.7-11:

... the city where the beautiful vessels, the masterpieces of the Yavanas [Ionians], stir white foam on the Culli [Periyar], a river of the Chera, arriving with gold and departing with pepper—when that Muciri, brimming with prosperity, was besieged by the din of war.

Another classical Tamil work, the Purananuru, describes Muziris as a bustling port city where interior goods were exchanged for imported gold. It seems that the Chera chiefs regarded their contacts with the Roman traders as a form of gift exchange rather than straightforward commercial dealings:

With its streets, its houses, its covered fishing boats, where they sell fish, where they pile up rice—with the shifting and mingling crowd of a boisterous river-bank, where the sacks of pepper are heaped up—with its gold deliveries, carried by the ocean-going ships and brought to the river bank by local boats, the city of the gold-collared Kuttuvan (Chera chief), the city that bestows wealth to its visitors indiscriminately, and the merchants of the mountains, and the merchants of the sea, the city where liquor abounds, yes, this Muciri, where the rumbling ocean roars, is given to me like a marvel, a treasure.

However, according to the Akanaṉūru, Roman trade seems to have been diverted from Muciri by Pandya attacks on the port, although it is difficult to date this episode:

It is suffering like that experienced by the warriors who were mortally wounded and slain by the war elephants. The suffering that was seen when the Pandya prince came to besiege the port of Muciri on his flag-bearing chariot with decorated horses. Riding on his great and superior war elephant the Pandya prince has conquered in battle. He has seized the sacred images after winning the battle for rich Muciri.

=== The Periplus of the Erythraean Sea ===
The unknown author of the 1st-century AD Greek travel book Periplus of the Erythraean Sea—which means Navigation of the Red Sea or Voyaging the Red Sea—gives an elaborate description of the Chera Kingdom in which the importance of Muziris is described:

... then come Naura and Tyndis, the first markets of Lymrike, and then Muziris and Nelkynda, which are now of leading importance. Tyndis is of the Kingdom of Cerobothra; it is a village in plain sight by the sea. Muziris, in the same Kingdom, abounds in ships sent there with cargoes from Arabia, and by the Greeks; it is located on a river, distant from Tyndis by the river and sea 500 stadia, and up the river from the shore 20 stadia ....There is exported pepper, which is produced in only one region near these markets, a district called Cottonara.

The Periplus reveals how the large settlement of Muziris became the prosperous main trade port for the Chera chiefdom through foreign commerce. Black pepper from the hills nearby was brought to Muziris by local producers and stacked high in warehouses to await the arrival of Roman merchants. As the shallows at Muziris prevented deep-hulled vessels from sailing upriver to the port, Roman freighters were forced to shelter at the edge of the lagoon while their cargoes were transferred upstream on smaller craft.

The Periplus also records that special consignments of grain were sent to places like Muziris, and scholars suggest that these deliveries were intended for resident Romans who needed something to supplement the local diet of rice.

=== Pliny the Elder's Natural History ===
Pliny the Elder gives a description of voyages to India in the 1st century AD. He refers to many Indian ports in his Natural History. By his time, however, Muziris was no longer a favoured location in Roman trade with South India.

To those who are bound for India, Ocelis (on the Red Sea) is the best place for embarkation. If the wind, called Hippalus (south-west Monsoon), happens to be blowing it is possible to arrive in forty days at the nearest market in India, Muziris by name. This, however, is not a very desirable place for disembarkation, on account of the pirates which frequent its vicinity, where they occupy a place called Nutrias; nor, in fact, is it very rich in articles of merchandise. Besides, the road stead for shipping is a considerable distance from the shore, and the cargoes have to be conveyed in boats, either for loading or discharging. At the moment that I am writing these pages, the name of the King of this place is Celebothras.

=== Ptolemy's Geographia ===
Ptolemy placed the Muziris emporium north of the mouth of the Pseudostomus River in his Geographia. Pseudostomus (literally, "false mouth" in Greek) is generally identified with the modern-day Periyar River.

=== The Muziris papyrus ===
This Greek papyrus of the 2nd century AD documents a contract involving an Alexandrian merchant importer and a financier concerning ship cargoes, especially of pepper and spices, from Muziris. The fragmentary record provides details about a cargo consignment valued at around 9 million sesterces brought back from Muziris on board a Roman merchant ship called the Hermapollon. The discovery opened a strong base for ancient international and trade laws in particular and has been studied at length by economists, lawyers, and historians.

=== The Cilappatikaram ===
The Tamil epic Cilappatikaram (The Story of the Anklet), written by Ilango Adigal, a Jain poet-prince from Kodungallur during the 2nd century AD, describes Muziris as a place where Greek traders would arrive in ships to barter gold to buy pepper. It also mentions that because barter trade was time-consuming, the traders lived in an "exotic" lifestyle that was a source of "local wonder".

The Cilappatikaram describes the Greek traders' return to their home country as follows:

When the broadrayed sun ascends from the south and white clouds start to form in the early cool season, it is time to cross the dark, billowing ocean. The rulers of Tyndis dispatch vessels loaded with eaglewood, silk, sandalwood, spices and all sorts of camphor.

=== The Tabula Peutingeriana ===
The Tabula Peutingeriana (Peutinger Map) is an odd-sized medieval copy of an ancient Roman road map that includes information possibly dating back to the 2nd century AD, in which both Muziris and Tondis are well marked and behind Muziris is a large lake. Beside the lake is an icon marked Templ(um) Augusti, widely taken to mean a temple of Augustus, a Roman emperor. Many Roman subjects must have spent months in this region awaiting favourable conditions for return sailings to Rome, which could explain why the map records the existence of an Augustan temple. It is also possible that the Romans had an actual colony in Muziris.

== Disappearance of Muziris ==
Muziris disappeared from every known map of antiquity, and without a trace, presumably because of a cataclysmic event in 1341: flooding in the Periyar River that altered the region's geography. In a study titled "In Search of Muziris", historians Rajan Gurukkal and Dick Whittakker say that the event—which opened up the present harbour at Kochi and the Vembanad backwater system to the sea, forming a new deposit of land now known as Vypin, an island near Kochi—was only the most dramatic of ongoing physical changes and land formation in the area "from time immemorial".

For example, according to Gurukkal and Whittakker, a geophysical survey of the region has shown that 200–300 years ago, the shoreline lay about 3 kilometres east of the present coast—and even further east some 2,000 years earlier, about 6.5 kilometres inland. They conclude: "If Muziris had been situated somewhere here in Roman times, the coast at that time would have run some 4-5 kilometres east of its present line. The regular silting up of the river mouth finally forced it to cease activity as a port."

== Archaeological excavations ==
A series of excavations conducted at Kodungallur, beginning in 1945, yielded nothing datable before the 13th century. Another excavation carried out in 1969 by the Archaeological Survey of India at Cheraman Parambu, 2 kilometres north of Kodungallur recovered only antiquities of the 13th and 16th centuries.

Two later excavations at Pattanam, however, fared better in their findings. In 1983, a large hoard of Roman coins was found at a site around 9.7 kilometres from Pattanam in locations suggesting an inland trade link from Muziris via the Palghat Gap and along the Kaveri Valley to the east coast of India. Still later, beginning in 2007, a series of pioneering excavations carried out by the KCHR uncovered a large number of artefacts. So far, seven seasons of excavations at Pattanam have been completed (2007–2014).

When the KCHR announced the possible discovery of Muziris at Pattanam based on archaeological finds, it invited criticism from historians and archaeologists—from, for instance, historians such as R Nagaswamy, KN Panikkar and MGS Narayanan, who called for further analysis. Others, however, supported it, including historian and academician Rajan Gurukkal, who commented that although he considered this site no more than a colony of Mediterranean merchants because it lacked evolved administration or sophistication, if Muziris had been located elsewhere he would have expected recorded evidence.

Although the KCHR chief stated to the media that whether Pattanam was the site of Muziris was of no concern to him, even the last field report on the excavations (2013) explicitly marks Pattanam as Muziris.

What archaeological research has shown for certain is that Pattanam was a port frequented by Romans, with a long history of habitation dating back to the 10th century BC, and that Roman trade links peaked between the 1st century BC and 4th century AD. A large quantity of artefacts from Pattanam represents the site's maritime contacts with the rims of the Mediterranean and Red Seas and the Indian Ocean. Major finds include ceramics, including amphora shards and terra sigillata; lapidary-related objects such as beads made of semi-precious stones; glass fragments; metal objects; Chera-era coins made of copper alloys and lead; architectural ruins; geological, zoological and botanical remains; and remains of a wharf, associated bollards, and a long wooden boat.

- Mediterranean objects: (100 BC to 400 AD) Amphora and terra sigillata shards; fragments of Roman glass pillar bowls; and gaming counters.
- West Asian, South Arabian, and Mesopotamian objects: (300 BC to 1000 AD) Turquoise glazed pottery; fragments of torpedo jars (large amphora-like ceramic jars without handles, used in transporting liquid commodities); and frankincense crumbs.
- Chinese objects: (1600 AD to 1900 AD) Blue-on-white porcelain shards.
- Regional/local objects: (1000 BC to 2000 AD) Black and red ware shards; Indian rouletted ware (a type of fine pottery characterized by a distinct decorated surface with incised grooves made with a wheel or roulette); gemstones; glass beads; semi-precious stone beads, inlays, and intaglio (seal rings); cameo blanks (unfinished pieces, often of porcelain, glass, or metal and designed to become a base for a cameo image or design); coins; spices; pottery; and terracotta objects.
- Indicators of urban life: (100 BC to 400 AD) Burnt bricks; roof tiles; ring-wells (wells constructed with stacked terracotta rings or bricks, often used as a source of water or as a drain in ancient times); storage jars; toilet features; lamps; coins; styluses; items for personal adornment; and scripts written on pottery.
- Indicators of industry: (100 BC to 400 AD ) Metallurgy reflected in iron, copper, gold, and lead objects; crucibles; slag; furnace installations; lapidary remains of semi-precious stones; and spindle whorls indicating weaving.
- Indicators of maritime activity: (100 BC to 400 AD ) A fired brick wharf; a warehouse; a canoe; and bollards.

Most remarkable of all the finds at the Pattanam excavations in 2007 was the fired brick structural wharf complex with nine bollards to harbour boats and in the midst of this, a highly decayed canoe, all perfectly mummified in mud. The canoe, 6 metres long, was made of Artocarpus hirsutus, a tree common on the Malabar Coast to make boats. The bollards, some of which are still in satisfactory condition, were made of teak. These items certainly show Pattanam carried on quite a bit of maritime activity.

Another intriguing find in the Pattanam excavations was one of three Tamil-Brahmi scripts—this one on the rim of a pot and dating to around the 2nd century AD—that seems to read a-ma-na, which in Malayalam would be a Jaina. If the rendering and meaning are correct, it establishes that Jainism was prevalent on the Malabar Coast from at least the 2nd century, and in turn the first time that excavators have found evidence relating to a religious system in ancient Kerala.

DNA analyses of skeleton samples discovered at Pattanam confirm the presence of people with West Eurasian genetic imprints in Muziris in the past. This is considered an indication of the huge international importance that the ancient port city once held in the past. However, the Archeological Survey of India (ASI) was more sceptical, suggesting that further research was required to confirm Eurasian presence at the site.

== The Muziris Heritage Project ==
The Muziris Heritage Project is a venture by the Tourism Department of Kerala to reinstate the historical and cultural significance of Muziris, the idea for which came after the KCHR's extensive excavations and discoveries at Pattanam. The project also covers various other historically significant sites and monuments in central Kerala.

The nearby site of Kottappuram, a 16th-century AD fort, was also excavated from May 2010 onwards as part of the project.

== See also ==
- Kottayil Kovilakam
- Kochi-Muziris Biennale – an international exhibition of contemporary art held in Kochi, Kerala.
