= Moothakunnam =

Moothakunnam Madaplathuruth
- Village
- Location in Kerala, India Moothakunnam (India)
- Coordinates: 10.186159°N 76.201279°E
- Country: India
- State: Kerala
- District: Ernakulam

Government
  - Body: Vadakkekara

Languages
  - Official: Malayalam, English
- Time zone: UTC+5:30 (IST)
- PIN: 683516
- Telephone code: 0484
- Vehicle registration: KL-42

Moothakunnam is a small village in the Paravur Taluk, Ernakulam district of Kerala, South India.

== See also ==
- North Paravur
