= Chendamangalam =

Chendamangalam ABN
- town
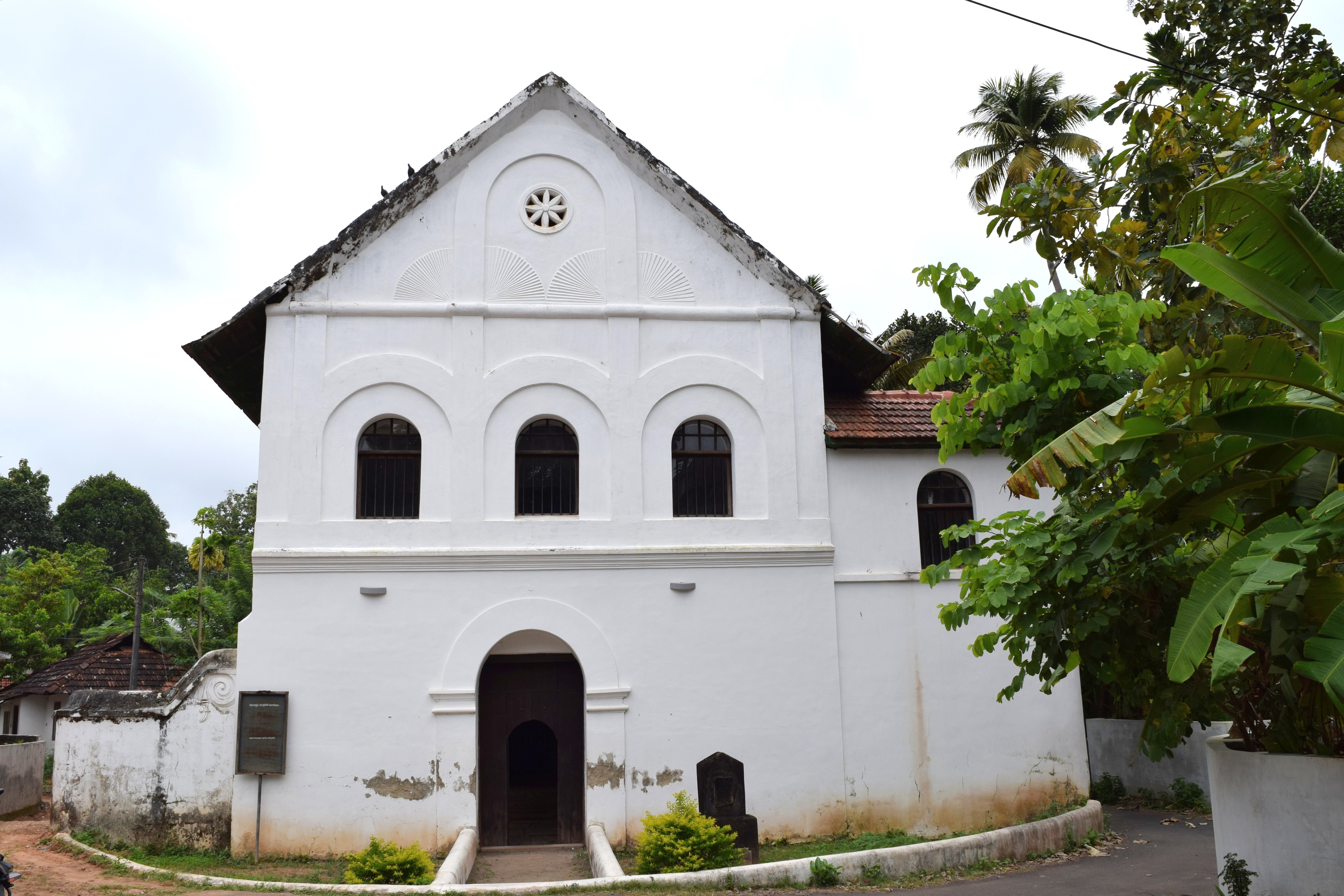
- Chendamangalam Jewish Synagogue

- Location within Kerala Location within India
- Coordinates: 10.1797°N 76.2097°E
- Country: India
- State: Kerala
- District: Ernakulam
- Taluk: Paravur

Area
  - Total: 10.83 km^{2} (4.18 sq mi)

Population
  - Total: 28,133
  - Density: 2,477/km^{2} (6,420/sq mi)

Languages
  - Official: Malayalam, English
- Time zone: UTC+5:30 (IST)
- PIN: 683512
- Telephone code: 0484
- Vehicle registration: KL-42
- Website: http://lsgkerala.in/chendamangalampanchayat

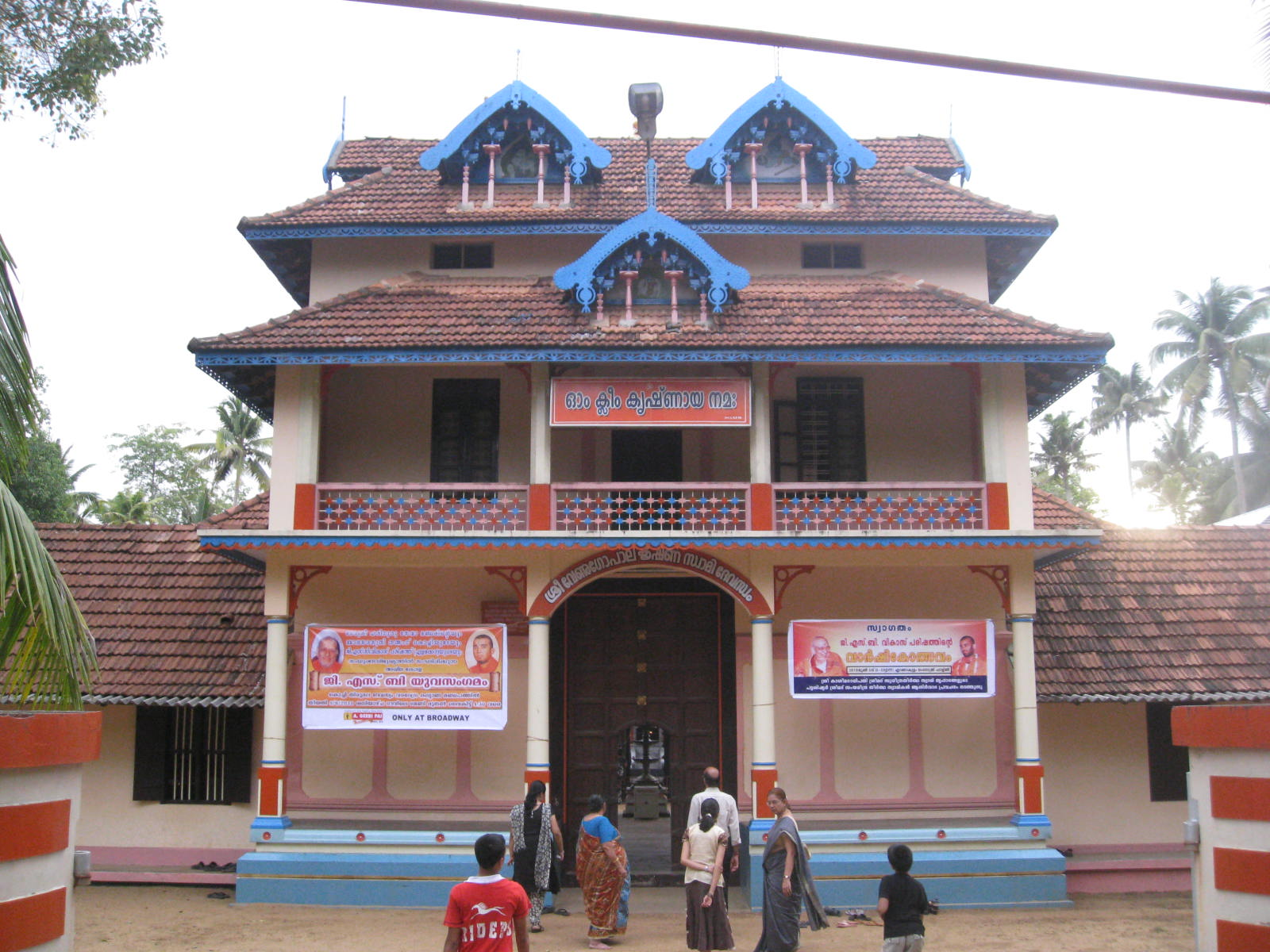
Chennot Shree Venugopalaswamy temple

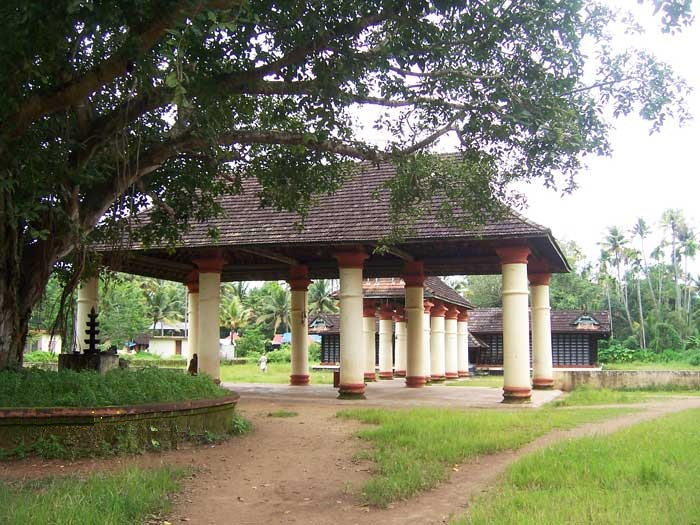
Puthiyathrikovu Shiva temple

Chendamangalam (or Chennamangalam) is a small town and a panchayat in Paravur Taluk, Ernakulam district in the state of Kerala, India.

== Location ==
It is about 23 km from Ernakulam. It has three rivers, seven inlets, hillocks and large expanses of green plain. The historic city of Kodungallur is about 9 km from the village.

== Attractions ==
The Paliam Palace, residence of the Paliath Achans, hereditary Prime Ministers and Raja under the former Maharajas of Kochi, is one of the architectural splendours of Kerala. The Palace is over 450 years old and houses a collection of historic documents and relics.

== History ==
The hillocks at Kottayil Kovilakam are unique as the site of a Hindu temple, a Syrian Christian church, a mosque and a restored Jewish synagogue, all within 1 km of each other. The synagogue was built in 1614 AD and is in a peaceful wooded area. In the courtyard behind the synagogue, it is possible to find old Jewish graves, including one of a Jewish woman, dated 1264 AD.

The Jews arrived in Chendamangalam after the destruction of the second temple and the final desolation of Jerusalem in (AD 69) and founded a colony. They moved to Fort Kochi in 1341 AD after the Great flood. All the 8 synagogues in Kerala built during the recent centuries — located at Chendamangalam, Paravoor, Mala, Kochi and Ernakulam — have similar traditional architectural features:

- a central bimah of brass or silver metal on a concrete or stone base
- an ark on the western wall
- a balcony above the eastern entry to the sanctuary that is used by the reader on certain holidays.
- a women's gallery behind the balcony, with a stairway leading up to it, usually from outside the building.

Also here are remains of the Vypeenakotta Seminary built for Syrians in the 16th century by the Portuguese. Adjacent to the seminary is an old Syrian Catholic Church built in 1201. It is also the site of the first printing press in India.

Chendamangalam was part of Kanayanur taluk, of the erstwhile Cochin State. The panchayat was formed in 1914. Bordered by rivers on the north, east and south, it is a meeting place of cultural diversity. Jews, Christians, Muslims and several of the distinct Hindu castes lived here harmoniously. The presence of immigrant communities like Konkinis (Gowda Saraswatha Brahmins) Moopans (Kudumbis) and the craftsmen categories viz. Kallasari (masons), Marassari (carpenters), Moosari (moulders), Kollan (blacksmiths), Thattan (goldsmiths), Chalian (weavers), and Kusavan (potters) to this day reminds of past industrial and business importance.

The Jewish community migrated to Israel in the 1950s and 1960s. Their synagogue is presently maintained by the archaeology department. There is also an abandoned Jewish cemetery behind the mosque, about 400 m from the synagogue, which has not been restored yet.

Mar Sleeva Church was established in 1075. The special fortified construction of the old block of the church is believed to have been constructed at the time of Tippu Sultan's invasion of Malabar.

Paliyam Satyagraha resulted in the temple entry proclamation in Cochin State. Mattachanda (Barter Market), an annual fair conducted every year on the eve of Vishu, is reminiscent of past history when people came from near and far to buy their domestic needs such as food ingredients, condiments, cutlery, pottery and furniture in exchange for their agricultural produce or hand made products, even though now all transactions are in cash.

The Paliam kovilakam of the Paliath Achan's, the hereditary Prime ministers and Raja under the Maharaja of Cochin lies here.

== Places of Worship ==
- Chendamangalam Synagogue

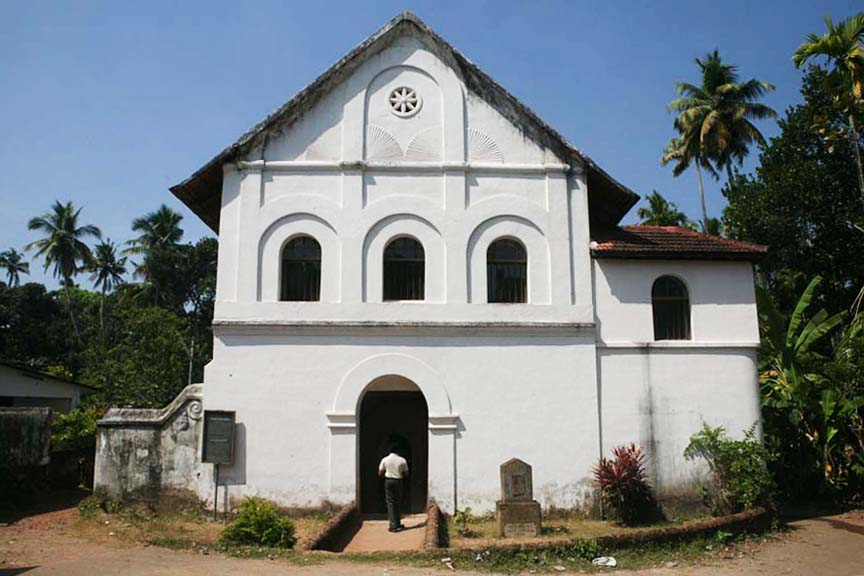
Synagogue at Kottayil Kovilakam

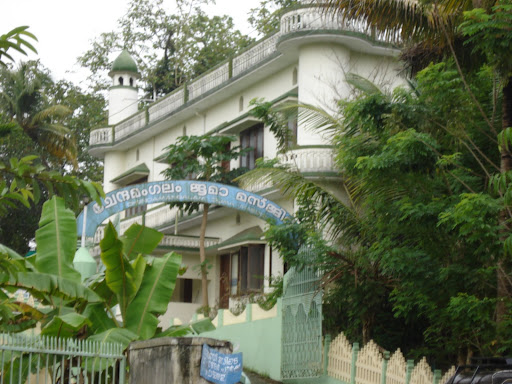
Mosque at Kottayil Kovilakam

- Sree Venugopala Krishna Swami Devasthan was established in 1900 AD at Chennamangalam (earlier known as Jayantha mangalam), the main deity is Venugopalakrishna Swamy. The main idol is Shila Vigrah of Venugopalakrishna Swamy. There is also an Utsav idol of the Lord and the idols of Garuda and Hanuman at His feet. The temple celebrates a six-day-long annual festival in the month of Vaisakh. Sree Venugopla KrishnaSwami Dewasthan
- Holy Cross Church, Kottayil Kovilakam
- St. Sebastian's, Gothuruth
- St. Threasa at Little Flower Church (koottukad) feast
- Little Flower Church, Kuttukad
- St. Sebastian Chappel, Paruvathuruth
- Chendamangalam Juma Masjid
- Parayil Ayyappa Temple, Vadakkumpuram, an ancient temple
- Kunnathuthali Sree Mahadeva Temple
- Kuttikkattu Bhagavathy Temple
- Kangolikattu Madapathi Temple
- Kokkattu Nagayekshi Temple
- Sree Krishna Swamy temple, Kottayil Kovilakam
- Kottattal Bhagavathy Temple
- Paliam Bhagavati Temple, Chendamangalam
- Paliam Sree Krishna Temple
- Paliam Ayyappa Temple
- Paliam puthiyathrikkovu shiva temple

== Demographics ==
As of 2001 India census, Chendamangalam had a population of 28,133. Males constitute 48% of the population and females 52%. Chendamangalam has an average literacy rate of 86%, higher than the national average of 59.5%; with male literacy of 87% and female literacy of 85%. 10% of the population is under 6 years of age.

== Education ==
- Paliam Govt. HSS, Chendamangalam
- St. Sebastians HSS, Gothuruth
- Dharmaposhani Sabha School, V P Thuruth
- Santacruz LP School, Kootukad
- Govt. LP School, Chendamangalam
- St. Joseph's High school, Chathedam
- St. Mary's LP School, Chendamangalam
- O.L.M.S, Kurumbathuruth
- H.I.J.P School, Chathedam

== Health ==
- Gothuruth PHC

== Localities ==
Manakodam, Chendamangalam, Gothuruth, Kottayilkovilakam, Vadakkumpuram, Karimbadam, Kochangady, Kurumbathuruth, Valiya Pazhampilly Thuruth, C P Thuruth, Kizhakkumpuram, Thekkumpuram, Chathedam, Kootukad, Kadalvathuruth, Palathuruth, Kunjvarathurth, Bharanimuku, Kottatal.

== Places of interest ==
- Paliam Kovilakam
- Kottayil Kovilakam
- Jew Market

The synagogue has been restored and has an exhibit open to visitors from 9:30 to 5:00 during the week. Chendamangalam Synagogue

== See also ==
- North Paravur
- Ernakulam district
