= Kottappuram, Thrissur =

Kottappuram
- village
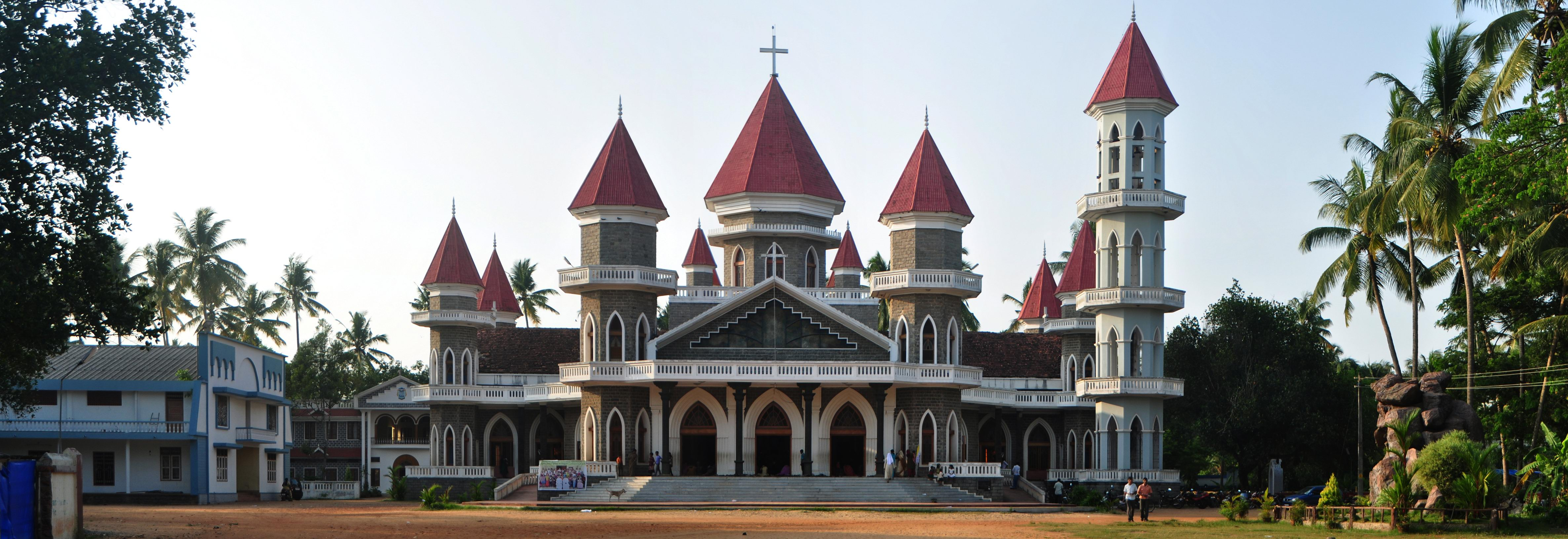
- Kottappuram, St. Michael’s Cathedral
- Interactive map of Kottappuram
- Coordinates: 10°40′0″N 76°11′0″E
- Country: India
- State: Kerala
- District: Thrissur

Languages
  - Official: Malayalam, English
- Time zone: UTC+5:30 (IST)
- PIN: 680667
- Vehicle registration: KL
- Coastline: 0 kilometres (0 mi)
- Nearest city: Kodungallur
- Climate: Tropical monsoon (Köppen)
- Avg. summer temperature: 35 °C (95 °F)
- Avg. winter temperature: 20 °C (68 °F)

Kottappuram or Kottapuram is a village in Kodungallur, Thrissur district, Kerala, India (Malayalam: കോട്ടപ്പുറം). Kottapuram is the southern boundary of Kodungallur. The place is named after a fort built by the Portuguese in 1523. It is also the headquarters of the Kottapuram Diocese. It is surrounded by Krishnankotta on the east, Thiruvanchikulam on the north, Gothuruth on the south and Valiya Panikkan Thuruth on the south. The main rice trade in Kodungallur is at the Kottapuram market. Historians believe that this market is as old as Sangham period. The site of the historic Portuguese fort is now under the protection of the Archaeological Survey of India. There is also a monument to Knai Thoma near the fort.

Nearest airport is Kochi International Airport.

== History ==
Kottapuram was a part of Muziris, the ancient port of Kodungallur and hence has a history as old as Muziris. Most of the traders of the ancient times were based on the fort, probably because it was surrounded by rivers on all three sides and had the landscape needed to become an early small port by sea. Rivers that are deep and shallow enough to enter from the sea was close to the lake. It can be seen that the Romans and the Greeks had trade relations even before Christ. They mainly bought pepper from Kerala.

For the first time in India, Jewish immigrants reached Kerala through Kottapuram. Their first habitat was Mala, east of the fort. Muslims also reached Kodungallur through Kottapuram. The first muslim mosque in India was built 3 kilometers north of Kottapuram by Malik Ibn Dinar. In AD 345, many Syrians came here under the leadership of the Babylonian merchant Knai Thomas. They also built churches and businesses here. There is a monument erected by the Archdiocese of Kottayam at the place where he is believed to have come.

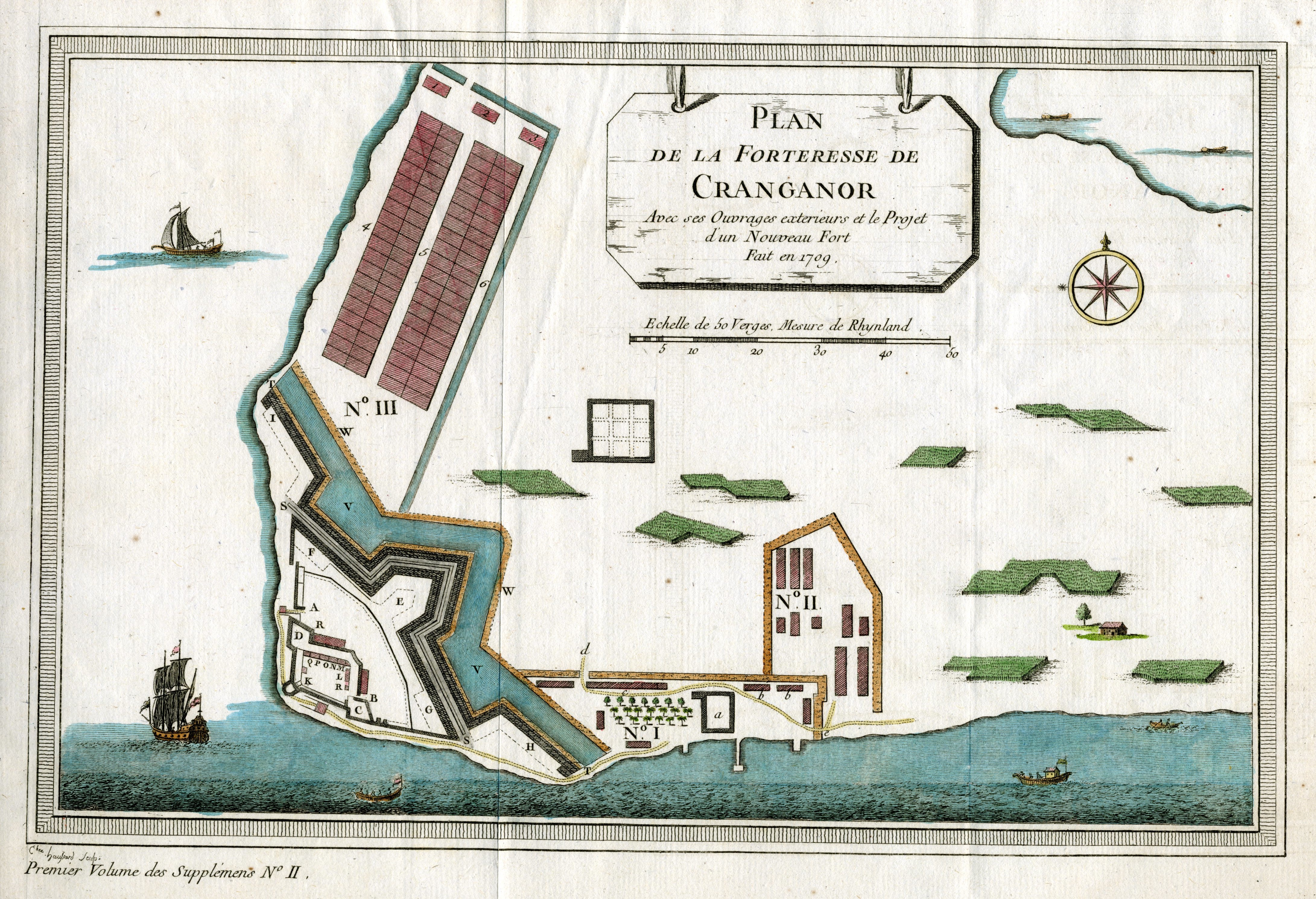
The Portuguese built Cranganore Fort (Portuguese: Fortaleza de São Tomé de Cranganor) in 1523, at the beginning of Portuguese rule, which lasted until 1662.

Fortaleza da São Tomé, known locally as Kottappuram Fort/Tipu's Fort, was constructed in Kodungallur by Portuguese in 1523. The fort was enlarged in 1565, and passed into the hands of the Dutch in 1663 who destroyed the fort.

Kottapuram Fort was an important part of the Nedumkotta fort built by Travancore under the leadership of Eustachius Benedictus de Lenoy to defend Tipu Sultan.

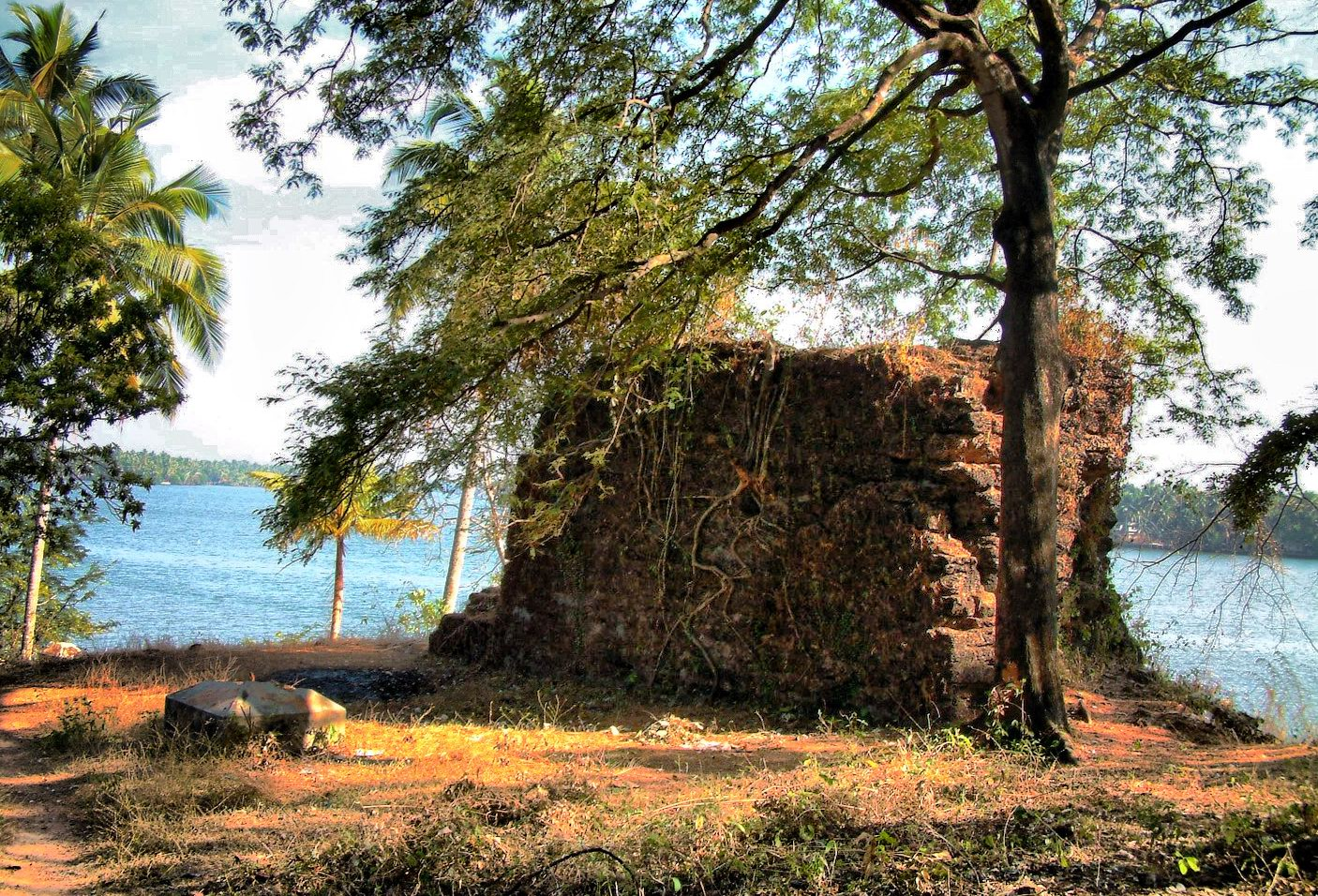
Relics of Cranganore Fort

== Etymology ==
The word Kottapuram means 'the place around a Fort' (Kotta means Fort). Since there are many fortresses in Kerala, the state has many places with a similar name. This particular place gets its name from a fort constructed by Portuguese in 1523. Only relics of the fort is seen as it was destroyed by Zamorin as well as Tipu sultan. The fort is known as Cranganore Fort. The fort is almost ruined now.

== Religion ==
The Roman Catholic Diocese of Kottapuram, which is a suffragan of the Archdiocese of Verapoly, has its see here.

== Schools ==
- St. Micheal's L.P. School, Kottappuram
- St. Anne's Higher Secondary School, Kottappuram

== Gallery ==
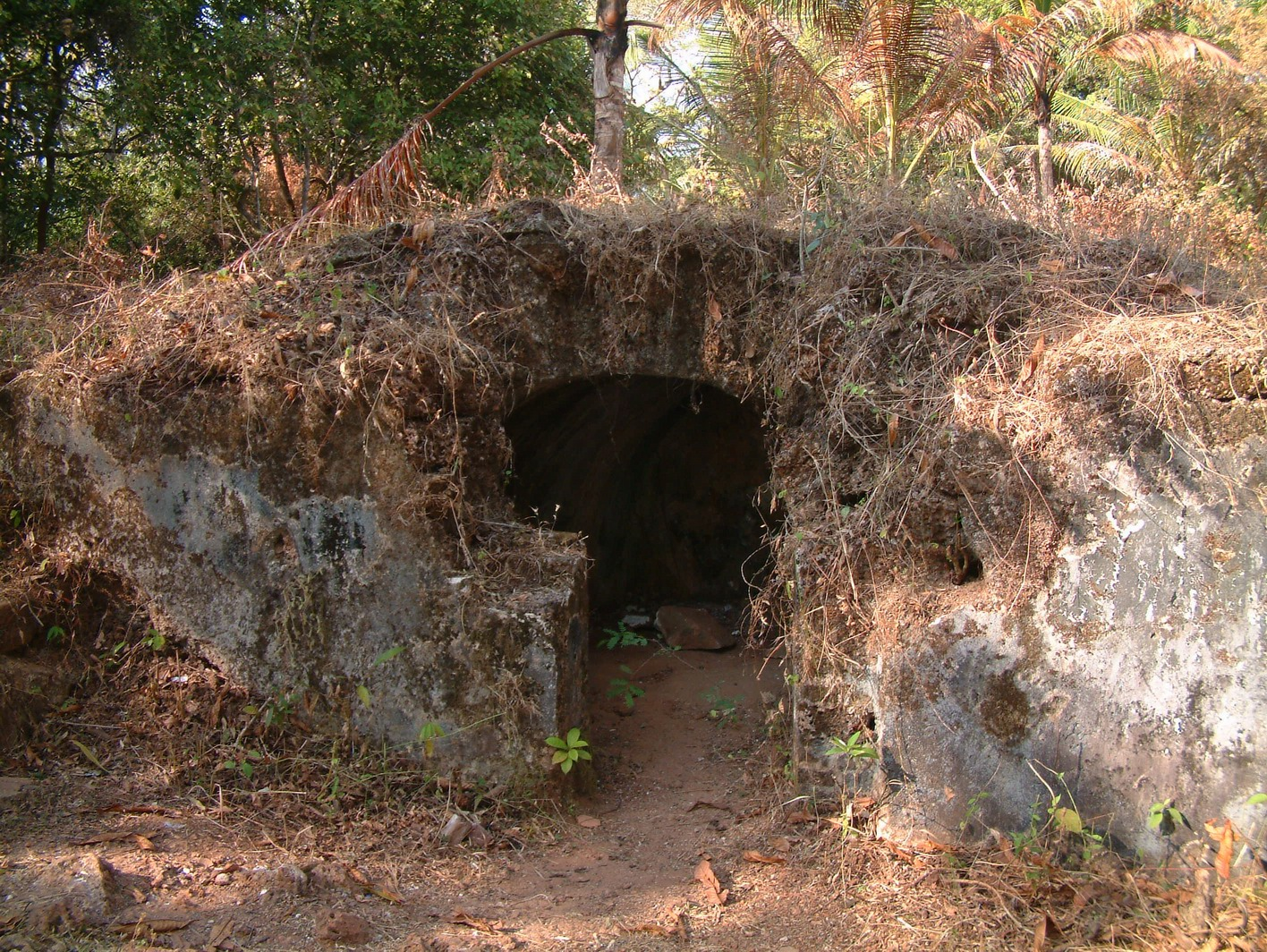
Relics of the cranganore fort - explosive store room

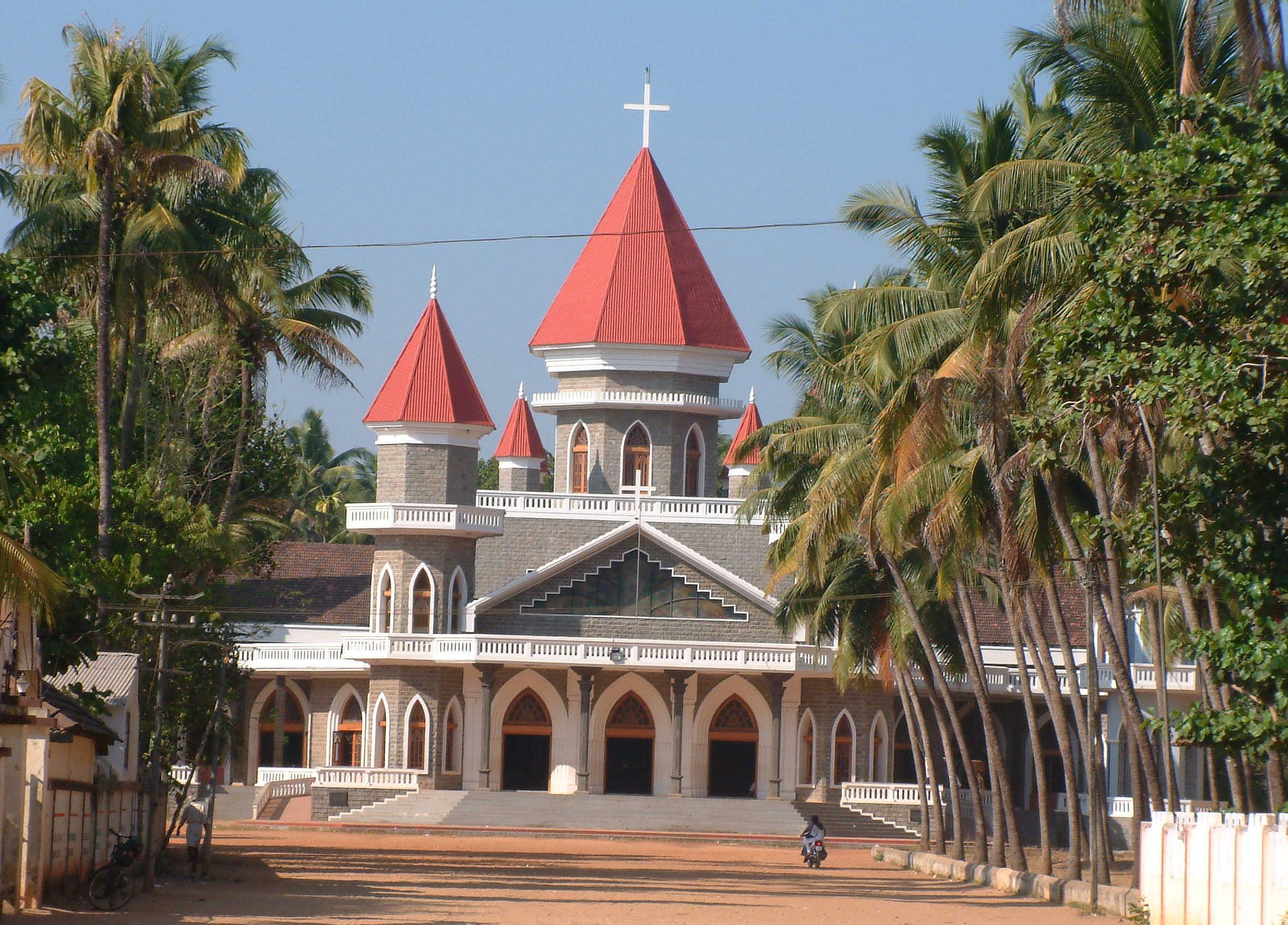
St. Micheal's cathedral

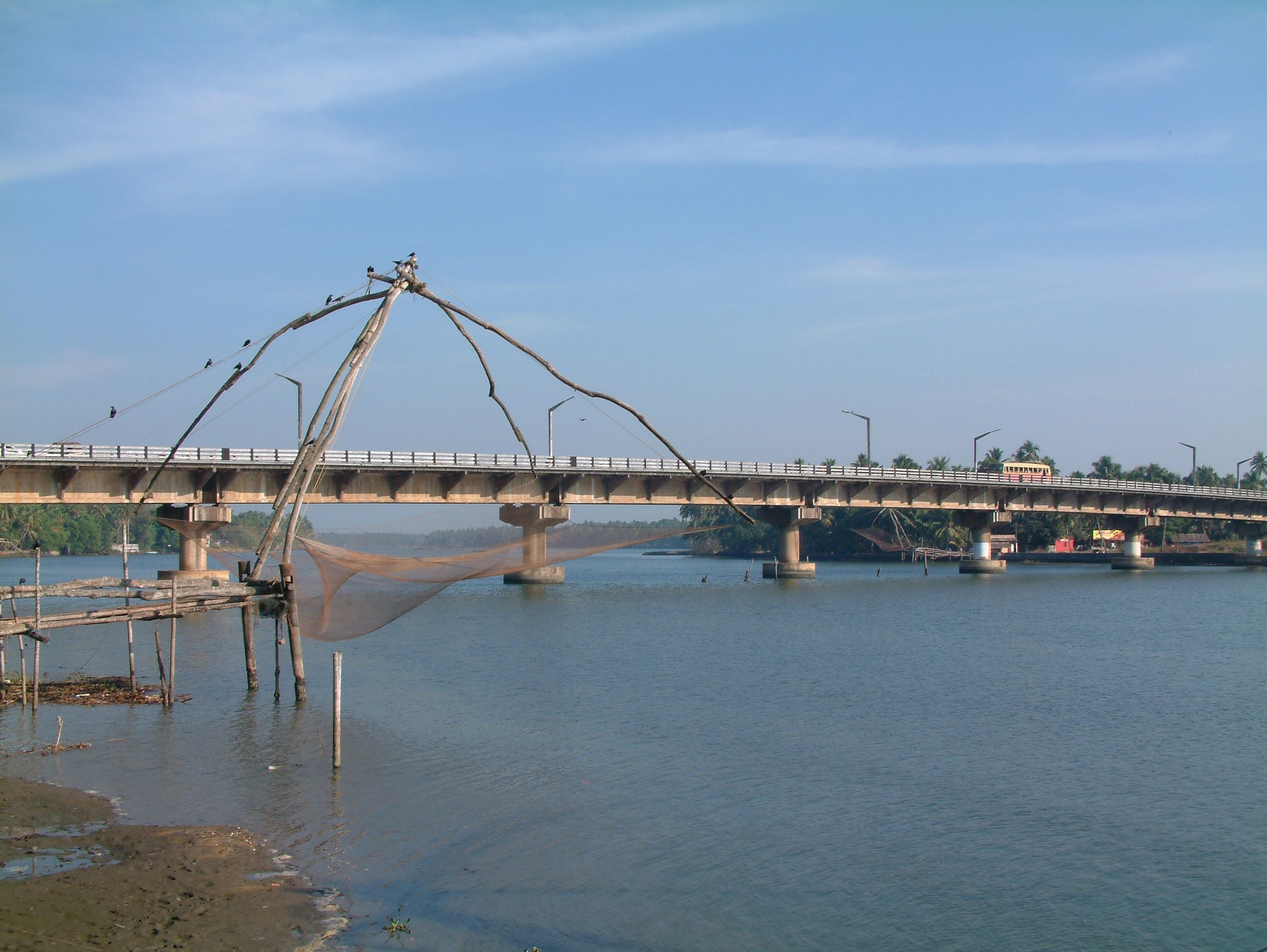
Kottapuram river, and bridge amidst some Chinese fishing nets

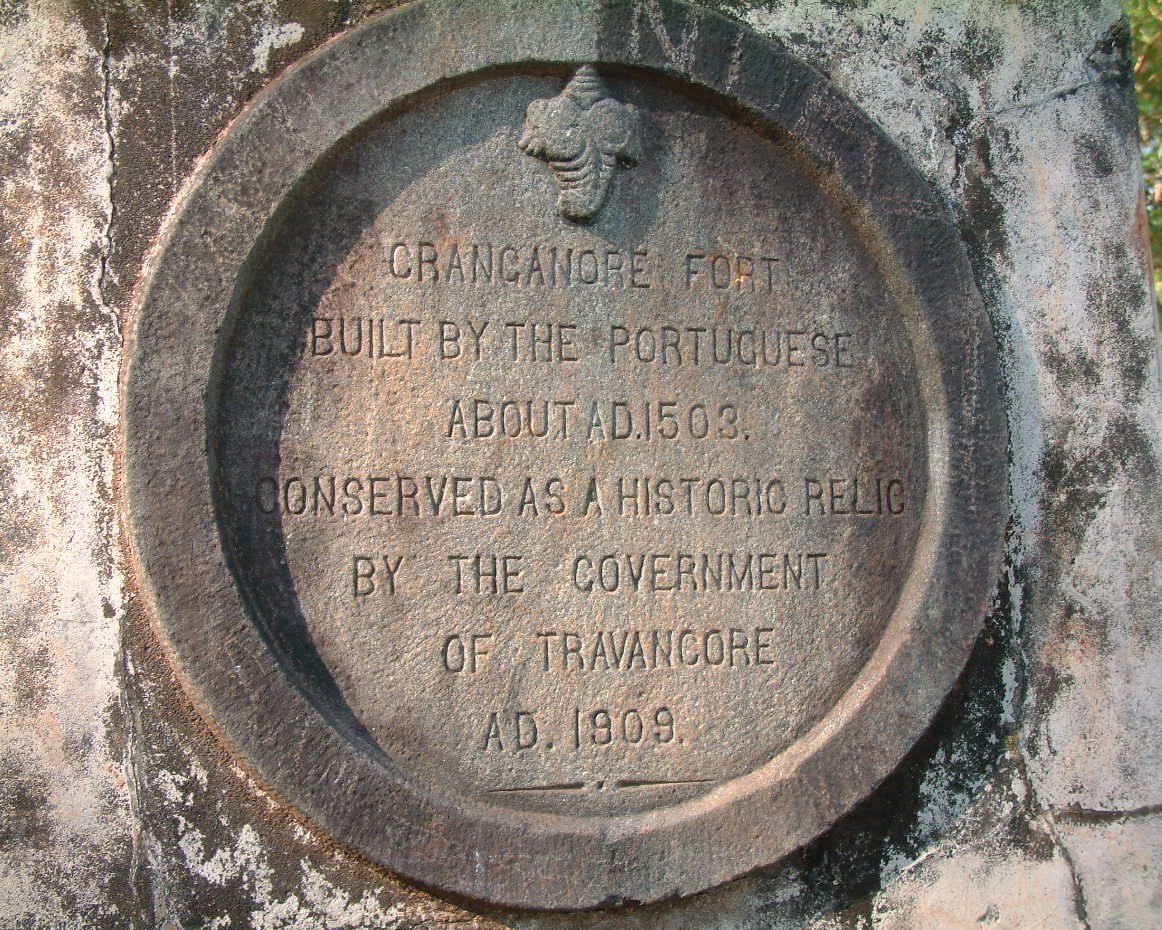
Monument erected by government of Travancore

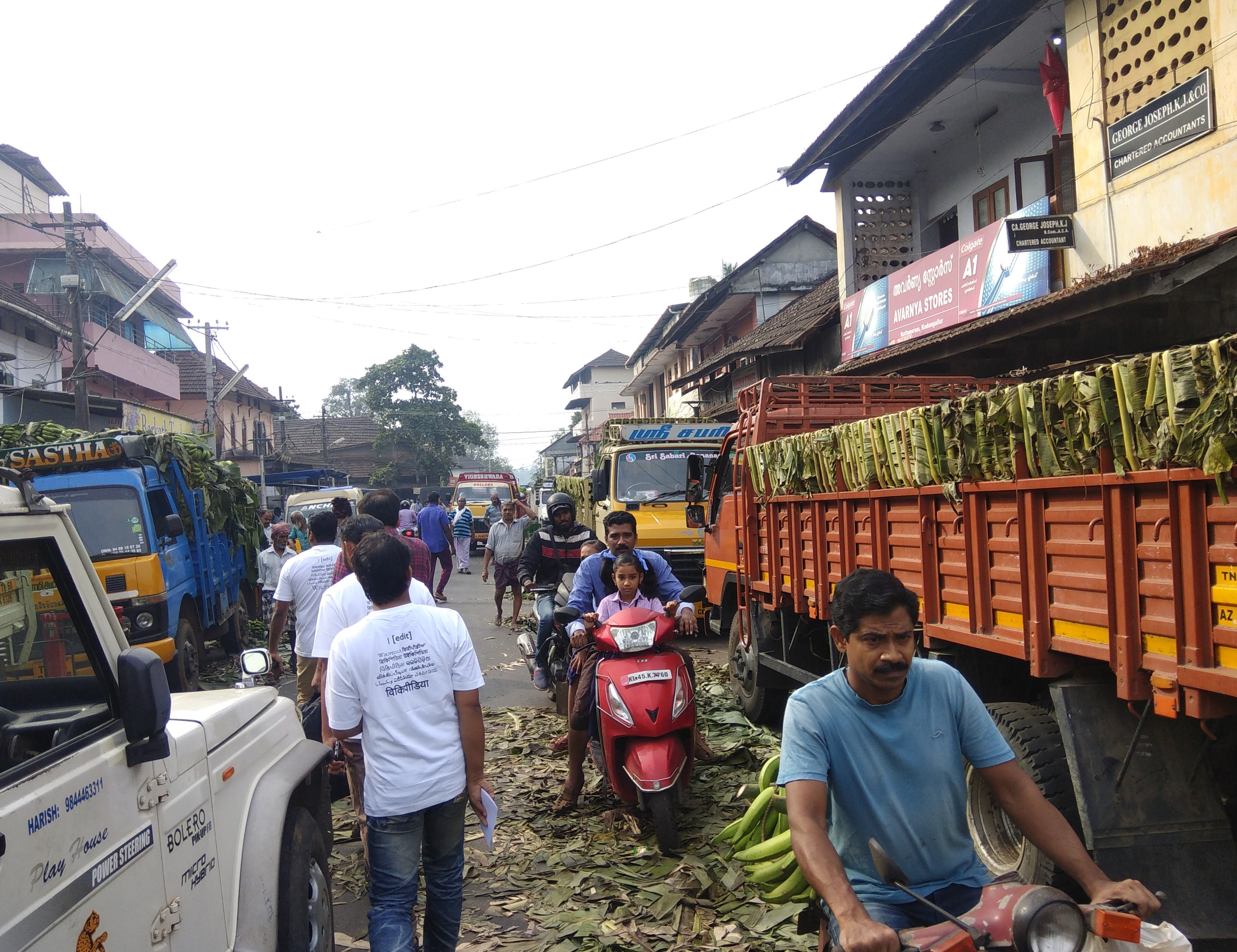
Kottappuram Market

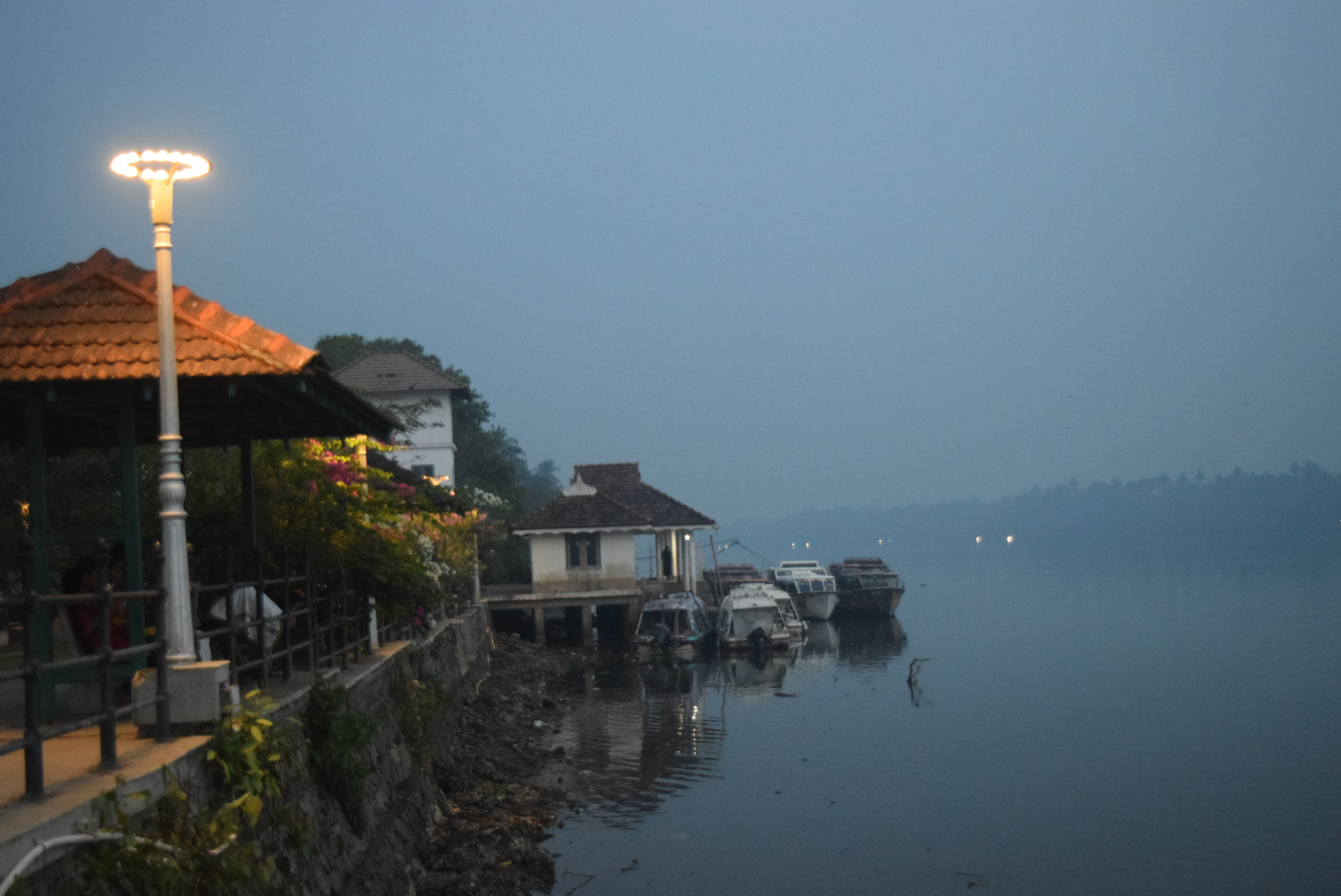
Boat Jetty near Kottappuram market

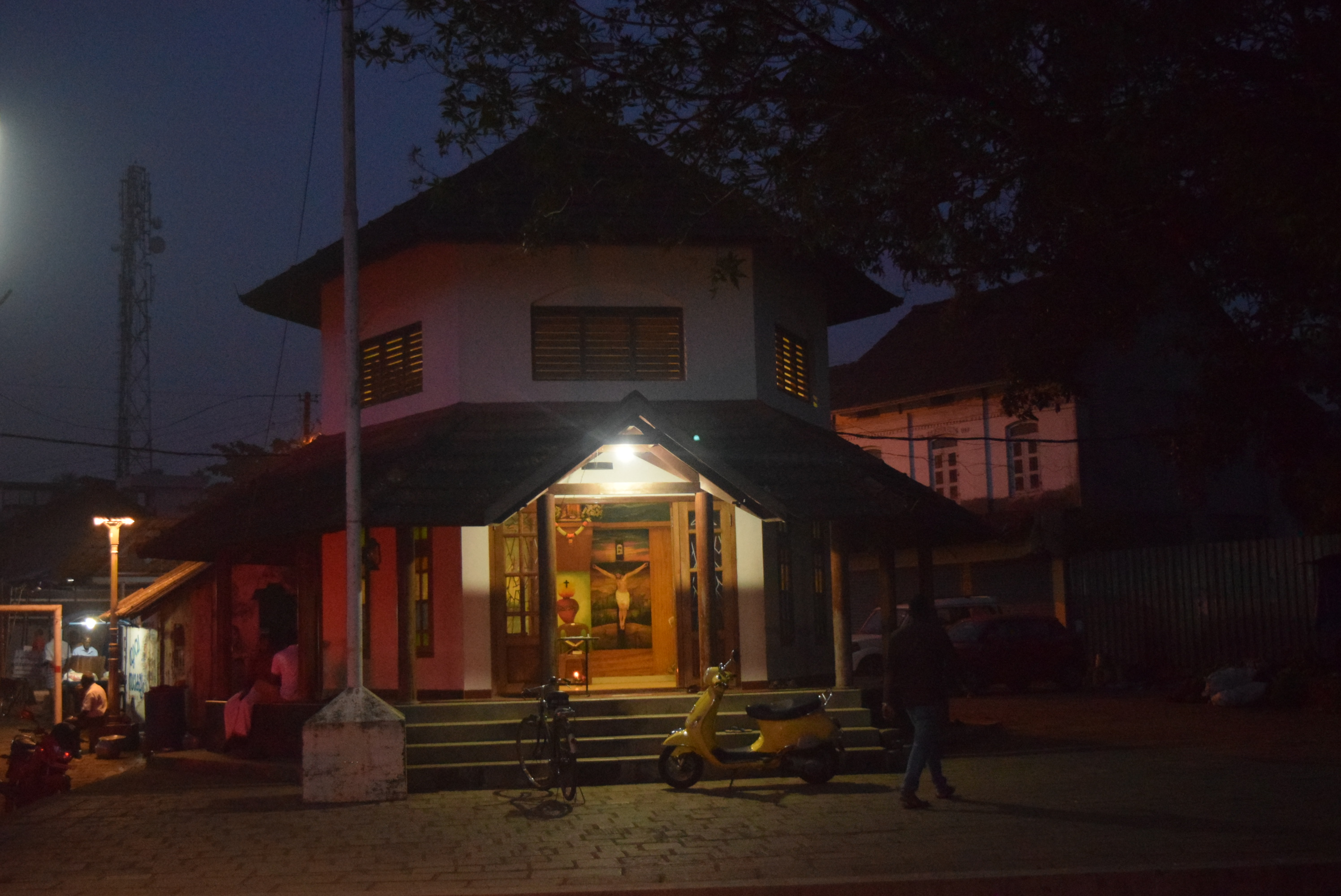
Church near Kottappuram Market

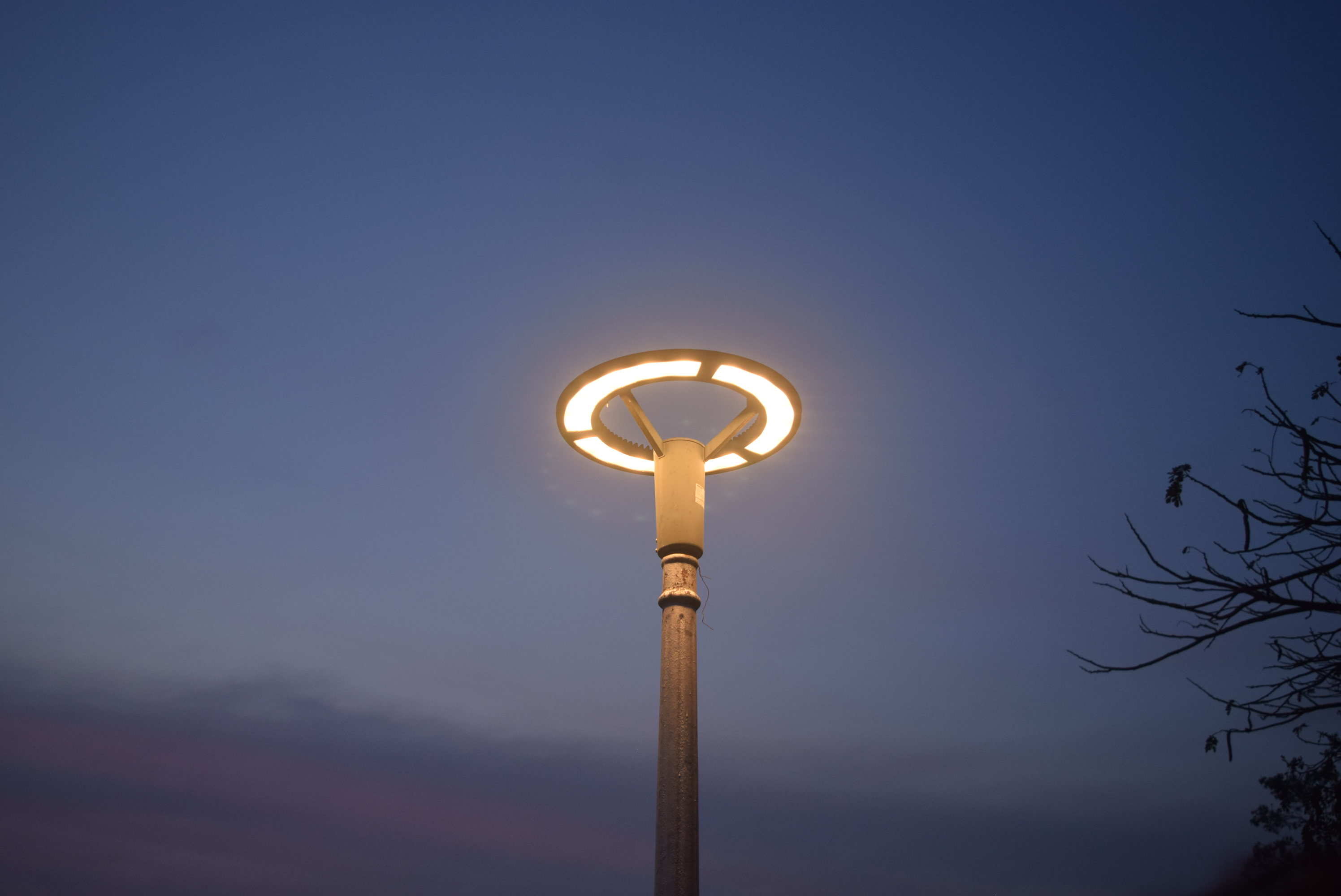
Light at Amphitheatre
