= St Thomas' Church, Thuruthur =

St. Thomas' Church, Thuruthur (or Thuruthoor) is a Roman Catholic place of worship in the diocese of Kottapuram in the ernakulam district of Kerala, India.

== History ==
Thuruthur is a small hill also known as Mount Sinai by the early Jews who came to Crangannore from the Middle East for the spice trade. From early Jewish historic documents and from the name "Mount Sinai", it is believed that a synagogue existed there as a place of worship for the merchants.

It is believed traditionally that St. Thomas visited this place called Mount Sinai for prayers, after landing in Musiris (Kodungalloor). St. Thomas preached the gospel of Jesus in this area and spread the good news to the surrounding areas. After the assassination of Thomas by a Hindu fanatic, the Christian communities established by St. Thomas flourished all over Kerala and different parts of India.

On the site of the present church there was a small shrine which was made with palm leaves.it was added as a sub-station to Thuruthipuram Parish, and hence become a Latin Church. One night, it is reported, people of the area (early Christians) heard the bells of the church chiming and as they came to the church they saw a powerful divine aura around the head of the statue of St. Thomas.

The renovated church as seen today was constructed by the believers in the region.

The church comes under the Muziris Heritage Project.

== Healing well ==
There is a widespread tradition in this locality that when St. Thomas came to this hill, Mount Sinai, he found a miraculous spring which in later years became a well, which never dries even in the scorching summer of South India. There are many stories of healing effected by water from this well and people of different faiths also come in the hope of receiving a blessing by contact with the well water.
