= History of Thrissur district =

Thrissur (formerly Trichur) is a district of Kerala situated in the central part of that state in South India. Spanning an area of about 3,032 km^{2} (1,171 sq mi), Thrissur district is home to over 9% of Kerala's population.

Thrissur district is bordered by the districts of Palakkad and Malappuram to the north, and the districts of Ernakulam and Idukki to the south and Coimbatore to the east. The Arabian Sea lies to the west and Western Ghats stretches towards the east. It is part of the historical Malabar Coast, which has been trading internationally since ancient times. The main language spoken is Malayalam.

Thrissur district was formed on 1 July 1949, with the headquarters at Thrissur City. Thrissur is known as the cultural capital of Kerala, and the land of Poorams. The district is known for its ancient temples, churches, and mosques. Thrissur Pooram is the most colourful temple festival in Kerala. The town of Kunnamkulam is a particular centre of the Christian population. Per the 2011 Indian Census, Hinduism is the majority religion in Trissur, at 58.4%; Christians and Muslim form significant minorities.

== Etymology ==
The word Kunnamkulam can be derived from the words kunnu (mountain) and kulam (ponds). There are several small hills in this area (Aduputty, Cherukunnu, Kizhoor, Kakkad Mission Kunnu, etc.) interspersed with the numerous ponds of the area (Eeenjakulam, Ayyankulam, Madurakulam, Chattukulam, etc.). One of the major spots within the town is the Parayil Angadi (market among rocks). The terrain condition and geological aspect of the area has led to the name. Kunnamkulam town has its own remote antiquity as is evident from the history. It was a part of Mahodayapattanam, the capital of Chera Dynasty.

History tells about the cross installed by Thomas the Apostle, at Chattukulangara (a part of Arthat in Kunnamkulam). During the invasion of Tippu Sultan the Christians from Chattakulangara migrated to Kunnamkulam town.

Manakulam, Cheralayam and Kakkaad (the suburbs of Kunnamkulam) were the seats of the Nambidis of Manakulam, Ayinikur and Kakkad Karanavappad respectively. They were collectively known as Thalappilli Rajas and belonged to three branches of the same dynasty.

The history of Kunnamkulam goes back to the Paleolithic age. The Kakkaad cave and Chowannur cave support this fact. It is said that this place was part of ‘MahodayaPattanam’ and was known as ‘Kunnamkulangare’. C. Achutha Menon in the Cochin State Manual says that, “it is in fact the chief center of the Orthodox Christians of the State, and there are several of their old churches in the town and its neighborhood”.

Moreover, “Most of the oldest and wealthiest Christian families are to be found in Kunnamkulam”. Cheruvathoor, Pulikkottil, Chungath, Kollannoor, Panakkal, Mekkattukulam, Paramel, Thengungal, Cheeran, Kanjirathingal, Moolapath, Tholath, Kakkassery and Emmatty are the most prominent among them. The competition for ascendancy between these wealthy families, opened up new dimensions in the development of printing and other literary activities. Panakkal Chakku, Cheru, Thengungal Ittoop, Varu and Koothur Paramel Iyyu Uttoop were arbitrators of some of these families. It is said that the Christian families were settled earlier at Chattukulangare shifted to Kunnamkulam after the invasion of Tippu in 1789. They were invited by the Thalappilli Rajas, provided residences and places of worship. They resided on both sides of the street. This may have helped to avoid threat from Tippu against Thalappilli Rajas.

Those settled on both sides of the street started trade and business, and began a new era of transaction.

=== Etymology ===
A cyber campaign was started that resulted in the changing of the often-misspelt name കുന്ദംകുളം (kundamkulam), to കുന്നംകുളം (kunnamkulam).

Apparently the wrong spelling " കുന്ദംകുളം(kundamkulam) " was being used for the city name on the Buses, Sign boards, Publications etc. This issue was brought into the social medias, where people unanimously opined to correct the spelling to കുന്നംകുളം kunnamkulam. This online debate further developed into a great discussion amongst the public and in all the other medias. The issue finally came in front of the Municipal Council meeting which laid down the rule to not use the wrong spelling കുന്ദംകുളം for കുന്നംകുളം anywhere.

== History of Kodungallur ==
It is postulated that the ancient city of Muziris (Muchiripattinam, Mahodayapuram/Vanchi) was devastated by natural calamities—a flood or an earth quake—in 1341, and consequently lost its commercial importance thereafter. Further, it came under military attacks on various occasions: in 1504 by the Portuguese-Kochi allied forces during their movement against Calicut in 1524, by the Mappilas during their attack against the Portuguese, and in 1565 again by the Portuguese.

== Etymology ==
The name Kodungallur is derived from Kodi-linga-ur ("the land of 10 million Sivalingas ur-village") according to common belief. Kodungallur was perhaps the revenue collection center of Kuda-kons (the Chera rulers) for the goods coming to the nearby port, hence the name Kudakonallur, which later shortened to Kodungallur.

Historically, Kodungallur has been identified as Mahodaya Puram, Mahavanchimana Pattanam, Thrikulasekarapuram, Jangli, Gingaleh, Cyngilin, Shinkali, Chinkli, Jinkali, Shenkala, and Cynkali, which are all derived from the name of the River Changala (or the Chain river, i.e., Shrinkhala in Sanskrit), a tributary of Periyar. Columguria, Kotilingapuram, Kudalingapuram, Kodunkaliyur, Thiruvallur, Ravivisvapuram and Balakreetapuram are a few other names, identified as Kodungallur in various related records or literary works.

== Chera period ==
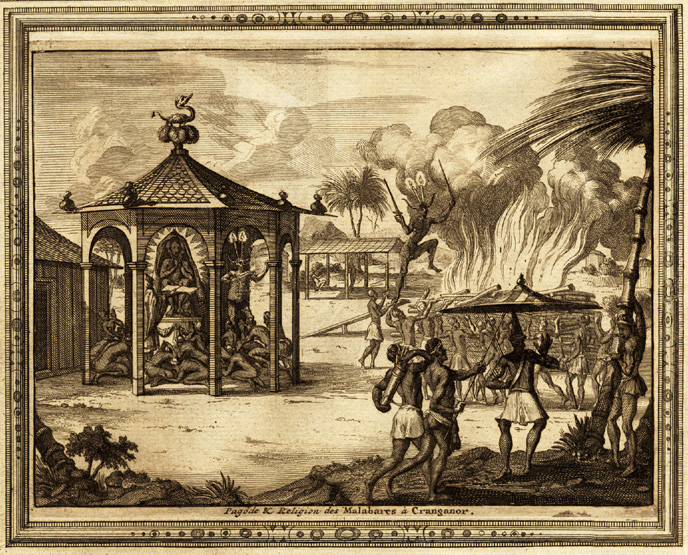
18th century depiction of the Hindu temple at Kodungallur

Kodungallur was an integral part of Mahodayapuram, the capital city of the Later Chera dynasty.

The Roman empire had a continuous trading connection with this region. Along with pepper, commodities such as pearls, muslin, ivory, diamond, silk and perfumes were exported using the maritime facilities of Kodungallur. Sulaiman, an Arab visitor to Mahodayapuram during this period, recorded the economic prosperity of the region and also testified to the high morals kept by its people. Also, he describes the Chinese traders in the city; they are described as purchasing articles such as pepper, cinnamon, ivory, pearls, cotton fabrics and teak wood, while selling fishing nets, silk and porcelain goods.

In the 11th century, Mahodayapuram (Now it is known as Kandanad) was captured by Rajendra Chola I of Chola dynasty. For the next few centuries, Kodungallur was a principality, named Padinjattedathu Swaroopam, under the control of a royal family, Kodungallur Kovilakam, allied either to kingdom of Cochin or to Calicut. Muziris is supposed to be destroyed by massive flooding of Periyar in the 14th century and consequently, the trade got diverted to other ancient ports of the Malabar coast, such as Kochi.

=== The tradition of Thomas the Apostle ===
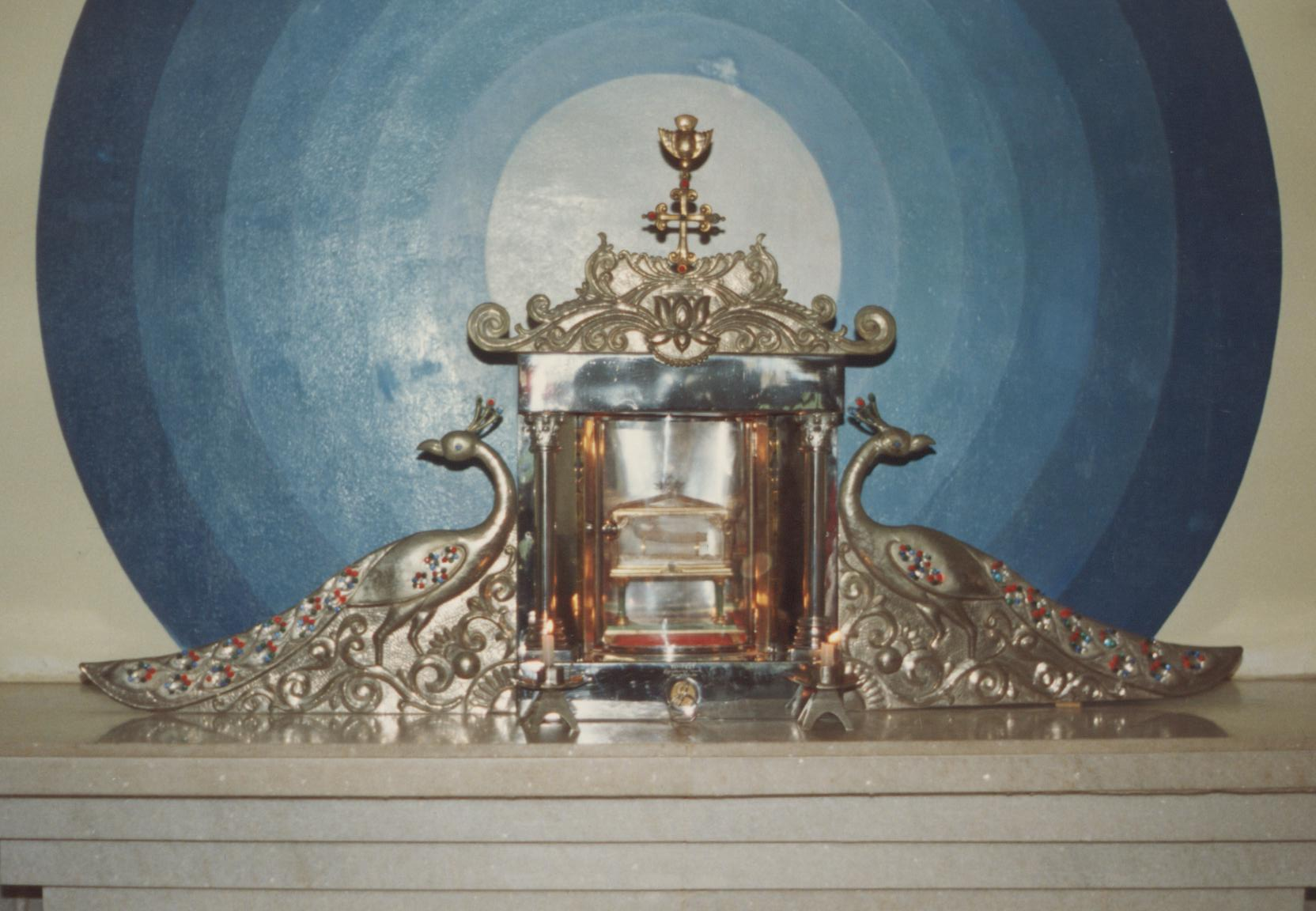
Relic of St. Thomas, kept in the sanatorium of a Syrian Church in Kodungallur

Traditional belief of Saint Thomas Christians of Kerala is that Thomas the Apostle landed in or around Kodungallur in the middle of the 1st century and founded Seven Churches, or Ezharapallikal: Kodungallur, Niranam, Nilackal (Chayal), Kokkamangalam, Kottakkavu, Palayoor and Thiruvithamcode Arappally – a "half church". According to one view, a Cochin Jew colony in Malabar Coast (later named Anjuvannam near Kodungallur), probably established before the 6th century BC, attracted the Apostle to this region.

=== Cheraman Juma Masjid ===
The tradition holds that Cheraman Juma Masjid in Kodungallur, built in 629 AD by Mālik bin Dīnār, is the oldest mosque in India and the second oldest mosque in the world to offer Jumu'ah prayers. Constructed during the lifetime of Muhammad, the bodies of some of his original followers are said to be buried there. Unlike other mosques in the region that face westwards this mosque faces east. The legend has it that a group of Muhammad's Ṣaḥāba (companions) visited Kodungallur. An unknown Chera dynasty ruler had witnessed a miraculous happening — the sudden splitting of the Moon, the celebrated miracle of Muhammad — and learned on inquiry that this was a symbol of the coming of a Messenger of God from Arabia. Soon after, the Chera ruler traveled to Makkah, where he embraced Islam, and accepted the name "Tajuddin". On his way back to India he died at Salalah in Oman. On his deathbed he is said to have authorised some of his Arab companions to go back to his kingdom to spread Islam. Accordingly, a group of Arabs led by Mālik bin Dīnār and Mālik bin Habib arrived in northern Chera kingdom and constructed the Cheraman Juma Masjid at Kodungalloor.

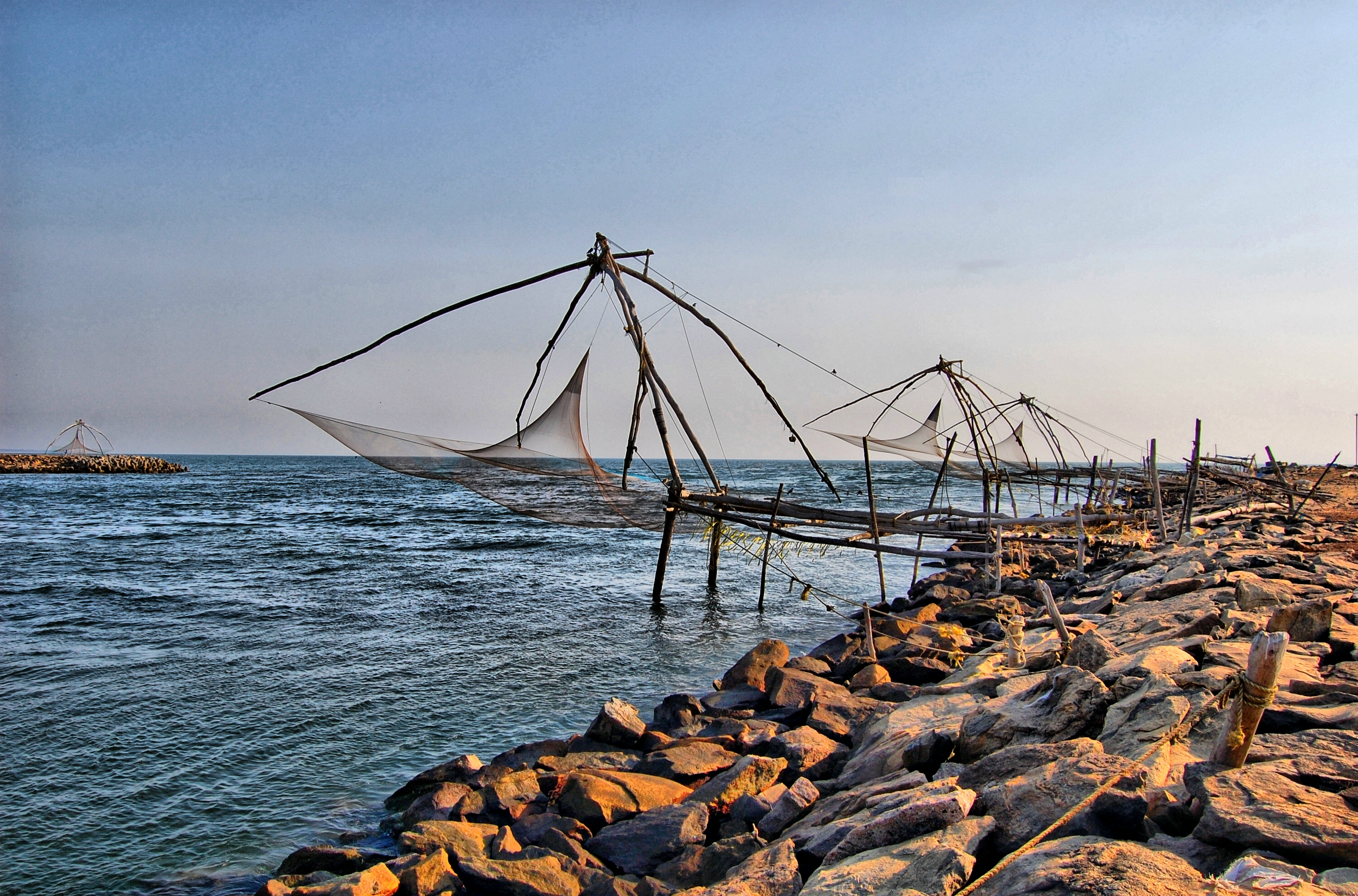
Cape of Kodungallur, where Periyar empties into Arabian Sea. Chinese fishing nets in the beach, believed to be installed by 14th century Chinese explorer, Zheng He, have also become a popular tourist attraction.

== Recent history ==
The glory of Kodungallur, as a global trade centre, is believed to be destroyed by natural calamities. According to one view it was heavy floods in the river Periyar that destroyed the city in 1341, while others point out to an earth quake in this regard. The floods further split the left branch of the river into two, just before the city of Aluva. The flood silted the right branch (known as River Changala) and the natural harbour at the mouth of the river to make it poorly navigable for large ships. The misfortune of Kodungallur helped other major ports of Malabar coast, such as the one at Kochi, to rise to prominence.

=== Colonial period ===
During Portuguese period, Kodungallur was a tributary state in the kingdom of Zamorin, the most powerful of independent rulers of Malabar region. Since the location of Kodungallur sandwiched between the kingdom of Zamorin and the kingdom of Kochi, it was often a matter of dispute for both the kings and sometimes the chieftain of Kodungallur switched the allegiance. Portuguese landed in Calicut in 1498 and soon they reached in an agreement with the Zamorin for establishing their trade with his subjects and also to open a factory in Calicut. Nonetheless, Portuguese forces tried to establish monopoly in spice trade using violent methods against the Arabs and other Muslim merchants from the Middle East, who had a longstanding loyal relation with the Zamorin. In fact, encouraged by foreign Muslims afraid of losing their monopoly on the spice trade (that also benefited the Venetians)Calicut was the only independent state in the Indian Ocean region at that time to militarily meet the Portuguese transgressions in the region, whereas Kochi opted to ally with the foreign Christians to contain the aggression of the Zamorin.

== Zamorin's period ==
The tussle between Zamorin and Portuguese, though started arising in 1500, broke into the form of a regional war in 1504. Portuguese forces extended their attack on Calicut to allied coastal states, including Kodungallur. The town was almost completely destroyed by the Portuguese (Suarez de Menezes) on 1 September 1504.

Kodungallur, being a port city at the northern end of the Vembanad lagoon, was a strategic entry point for Zamorin's army and fleet into the Kerala backwaters. Hence, in October 1504 Zamorin dispatched a force to fortify Kodungallur. Reading this movement as a preparation for a renewed attack on Kochi, the Portuguese commander, Lopo Soares, ordered a preemptive strike. A squadron of around ten fighting ships, accompanied with numerous fighting boats of Kochi, headed up to Kodungallur. The heavier ships, unable to make their way into the shallow channels, anchored at Palliport (Pallipuram, on the outer edge of Vypin island), while smaller frigates progressed to the destination.

Converging on Kodungallur, the Portuguese-Kochi fleet quickly dispersed the Calicut forces on the beach using cannon, and launched their composite army – some 1,000 Portuguese soldiers and 1,000 Nair warriors of Kochi – who took on the rest of the enemy force in Kodungallur. The assault troops captured and sacked the city of Kodungallur, and was set on fire by the squads led by Duarte Pacheco Pereira and Diogo Fernandes Correa. Nonetheless, according to some records, Portuguese arsonists spared the Saint Thomas Christian quarters in the city. (At the time the community was in a tenuous position: though thriving in the spice trade and protected by their own militia, the local political sphere was volatile and the Saint Thomas Christians had found themselves under pressure from the rajas of Calicut, Cochin and other small kingdoms in the area. Hence the community had sought an alliance with the Portuguese newcomers. Since they were one of the major suppliers of pepper in the region, Portuguese also found the relation as reciprocating.) This might have helped the ancient Christian community of Kodungallur from extinction during the 1504 assault on the city.

== Calicut fleet ==
The Calicut fleet, some five ships and 80 paraus, that had been dispatched to save the city was intercepted by the idling Portuguese ships near Palliport and defeated in a naval encounter. In the meantime, the raja of the Kingdom of Tanur (Vettattnad), whose kingdom lay to the north, on the road between Calicut and Kodungallur, who had a spoiled relation with the Zamorin, offered to place himself under Portuguese suzerainty. It is recorded that the military of Calicut, which was led by Zamorin in person, was defeated on their way to Kodungallur by a sizeable Portuguese army with the assistance of the Tanur ruler.

The raid on Cranganore and the defection of the Tanur raja were serious setbacks to the Zamorin of Calicut, pushing the frontline north and effectively placing the Vembanad lagoon out of the Zamorin's reach. The battle set the scene for Portuguese to expand their colonial authority over a significant area of the Malabar coast. By 1510, their fluid power in the Malabar coast solidified into a perceptible territorial entity.

In 1662, the Dutch entered the competition, sacked the Portuguese in a fortnightly war, with the help of Zamorin, and occupied Kodungallur. The Dutch took the control of Kodungallur fort in 1663 and it eventually protected the southern Kerala, especially Travancore, from the Mysorean invasion in 1776. In 1786, Mysorean troops again marched to northern Kerala, but failed to progress ahead of Kodungallur. On 31 July 1789, the Dutch handed over their establishments in Kodungallur and Azhikode to the Kingdom of Travancore for 300,000 Surat silver rupees.

== Archaeology ==
Until the 1980s, it was generally believed that Kodungallur and Muziris were synonymous from the historical point of view. In 1983, a large hoard of Roman coins was excavated at a site in a small town, called Pattanam, about six miles from Kodungallur. Now this location is one of the most significant archaeological sites in South Asia. The excavations carried out at Pattanam from 2007 to 2011 have uncovered a plethora of archaeologically important materials: over 20,000 articles have now been recovered including terracotta objects, beads, amphora pieces, cannonballs and four skeletons. It has prompted many historians to hypothesize Pattanam as the location of Muziris.

=== Kodungallur fort ===
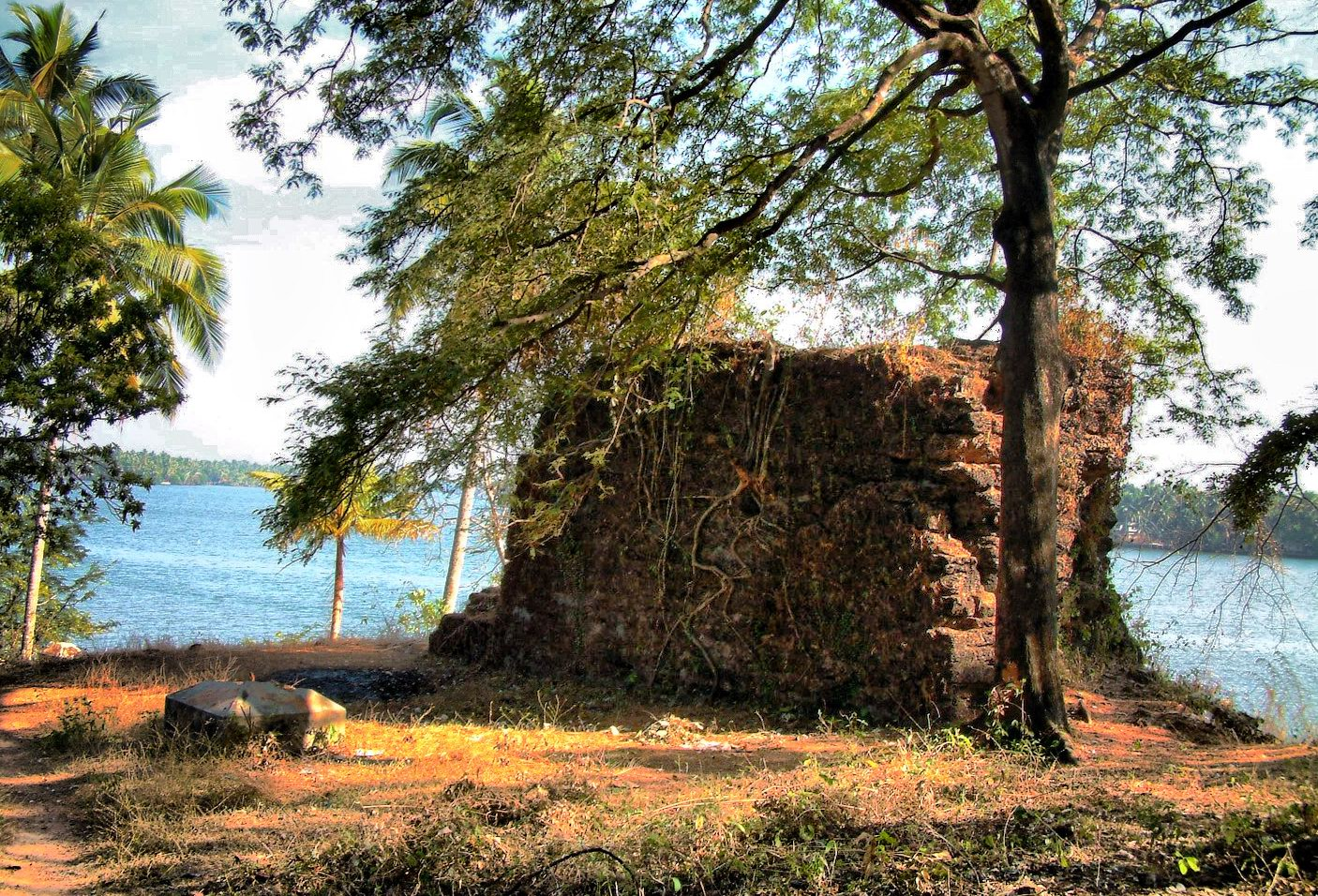
Relics of the Cranganore Fort built by the Portuguese on the shores of the Kottapuram River

Cranganore Fort, also known as Kottappuram/Kottapuram Fort, was built by Portuguese in 1523 and later in 1565 it was enlarged. The fort was named as Fortaleza Sao Tome, by the Portuguese. The Dutch took possession of the fort in 1663. The remains of the fort show that the original fort wall was 18 feet in thickness. The ruin is also known as Tipu's fort.

=== Muziris Heritage Project ===
A project, named Muziris Heritage Project, was launched by the Department of Cultural Affairs, Kerala in 2006 to scientifically retrieve and preserve the historical heritage of the region, extending from North Paravur to Kodungallur. The project envisages a combination of heritage management initiatives in its restoration, conservation and access to the public. Kerala Council for Historical Research (KCHR), identified as the nodal agency for Muziris Heritage Project, provides academic guidance and undertakes archaeological and historical research in the region. The first phase of Muziris Heritage Project was opened to the nation by HE the president of India Shri. Pranab Mukharjee on 27 February 2016 at Kodungalloor.
