= Nedumkotta =

Former 18th century fortification in Kerala, India

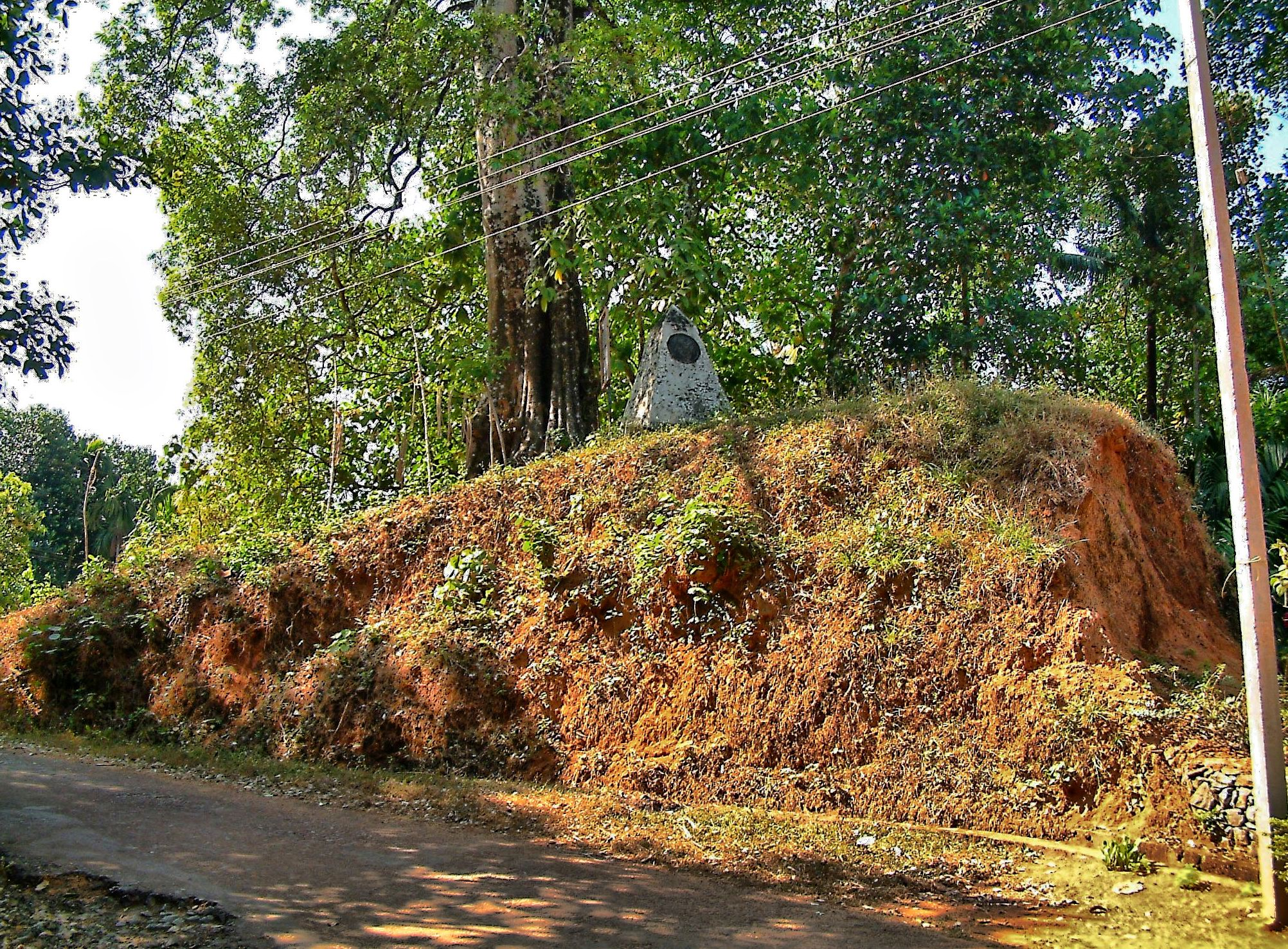
The relics of the entrance of travancore lines

Nedumkotta or the Travancore lines was a wall built as a protection against consistent invasions from Mysore during the (de facto) rule of Tipu Sultan in South India. It was built by the Dharma Raja Karthika Thirunal (d.A D 1764), King of Travancore, with the request, support and permission of the Kingdom of Kochi. It was constructed by Rama Varma under the supervision of his commander Eustachius De Lannoy. The work was started in 1762 and it was completed only by 1775. The lines consist of a ditch about sixteen feet broad and twenty feet deep with a thick bamboo hedge in it, with a slight parapet, good rampart and bastions on rising grounds almost flanking each other from one extreme of the lines to the other. The construction of Nedumkotta or the Travancore Lines is considered to be a unique and unparallel episode in Indian history by historians.

== Background ==
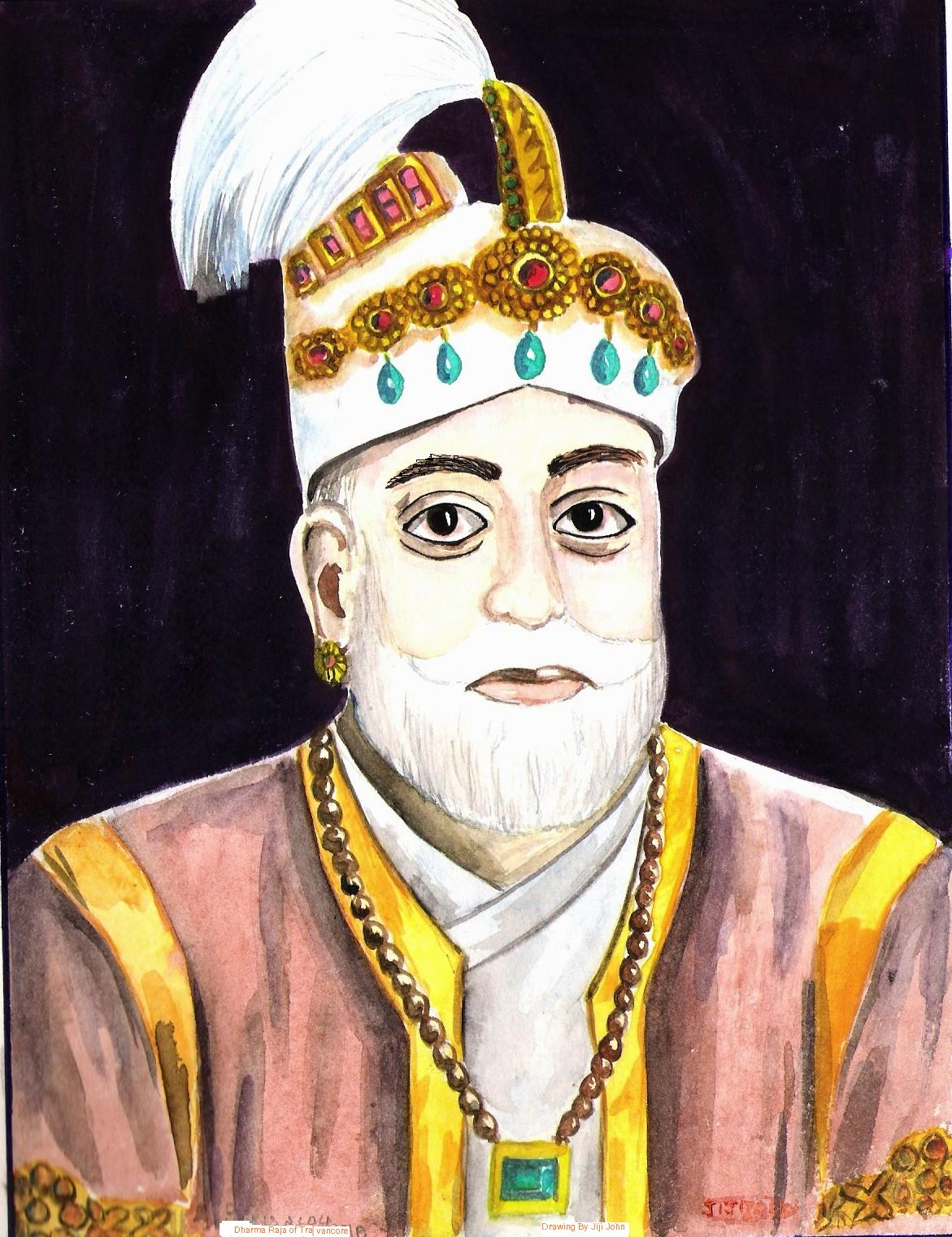
Dharma Raja

The Nedumkotta was a defence fortification constructed along the northern borders of the erstwhile Travancore allied Cochin State of 1757–1762 AD. The places north of Nedumkotta was under Zamorin occupied Cochin (1757–1762). It passed through the territories of the then Cochin State.

The Nedumkotta was built primarily to resist the invasion under Hyder Ali Khan against Travancore State and southern parts of Cochin State. It was raised mainly with clay and mud, and reinforced with stones, laterite and granite at strategic places. It started from the Krishan Kotta on the west coast, above Kodungallur, and stretched up to the Anamala Hills on the Western Ghats. It was about 48 km long, 20 feet wide and 12 feet high. The lines consisted of a ditch, sixteen feet wide and twenty feet deep with a thick bamboo hedge, a slight parapet and rampart and bastions on rising grounds almost flanking each other from one side of the lines to the other.

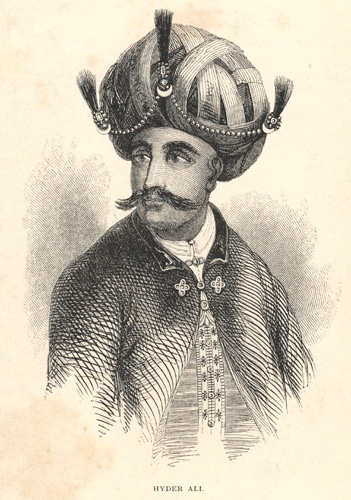
Hyder Ali of Mysore

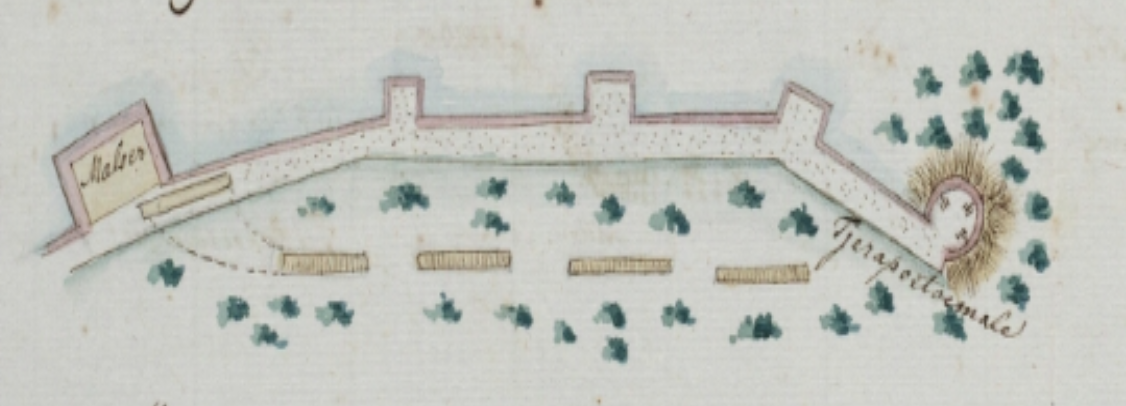
The Travancore lines. Meloor Gate can be seen. Work by Commander Johan Gerard van Angelbeek

Its alignment was along the Periyar river on the west coast up to Chalakudy from where it went along the Chalakudy river up to the Annamalai Hills in the east. There were underground cells to store gunpowder and other war materials, special chambers for soldiers to live, and look-outs and mounted field-guns all along the fortification. On the north side of the fortification, ditches were dug twenty feet wide and sixteen feet deep, and filled with thorny plants, poisonous snakes, and hidden weapons. On the south side as well as on the top of the fortification, wide roads were laid for the convenience of military movements. The construction work was started in 1762 and was completed only by 1775 from where it was extended to Vypin.

Much to the dislike of Tippu Sultan, parts of the Travancore Lines were built on Cochin territory and a large part of the Cochin State was behind Travancore lines. This was a violation of Mysore's territorial agreement and was considered as an encroachment of its territory. Tippu Sultan contacted Travancore Raja to destroy the Lines as early as possible. Tippu Sultan wrote to the Raja, "The Cochin Raja has been my tributary fifty or sixty years – after I possessed the Calicut country you erected lines on a part of the Cochin country. This conduct is not proper, you must demolish the line", to which Cochin Raja replied that the areas where the Lines were established was given to him earlier than the Cochin country became a tributary to Mysore, quote, "I possessed it and had lines were erected on it when I was included in the Treaty of peace which the Honourable English Company made with you. If I had not a right to it, why did you then not demand it".

In about June–August 1787 after learning about the geography of Malabar and Travancore and constructing several roads leading into Travancore both from the north by coastal side and from the east by the Cambam and Guddalur passes, Tippu Sultan then invaded Malabar. He persecuted the people and chiefs, massacring all those who refused to take up Islam. Many families including that of Samoothiri fled Malabar and took refuge in Travancore. Around 30,000 noble Brahmin families were sheltered under the Dharmaraja of Travancore. This angered Tippu and he wanted Cochin to surrender all those families who fled Malabar, but the Raja refused to give in. Tippu could not make a bold appeal to the war as Travancore was included in the Peace Treaty between Mysore and the East India company as a friendly country to the company. Tippu then resorted to Samoothiri to attack Cochin, promising him in return the restoration of a portion of his territory, to which Samoothiri promptly refused. Tippu then requested the help of the Cochin Raja to speak to Dharma raja to become a tributary of Mysore which was then was defied by stating that nothing would be done against the will of the East India Company. This enraged Tippu, who planned then to invade the Travancore demolishing Nedumkotta.

The Maharaja informed the Madras Governor, Sir Archibald Campbell, the proceedings and requested him to lend him 4 English officers and 12 Sergeants to command his army and, anticipating an early invasion by Tippu, commanded Dewan Kesava Pillai to look to the frontier fortifications. The governor then wrote to Tippu that an invasion against Travancore would be considered as a breach of the Treaty made with the Company. He also offered two or three battalions to assist Raja in his frontiers. Two regiments under Captain Knox were stationed near Ayacotta for the first time and Mr. George Powney, a Civil Officer, was sent as an agent of the Company to the Travancore Court. Travancore Raja also entered in to a treaty with Dutch Army by which he was handed over the Cranganore Fort and Aycotta.

== The structure ==
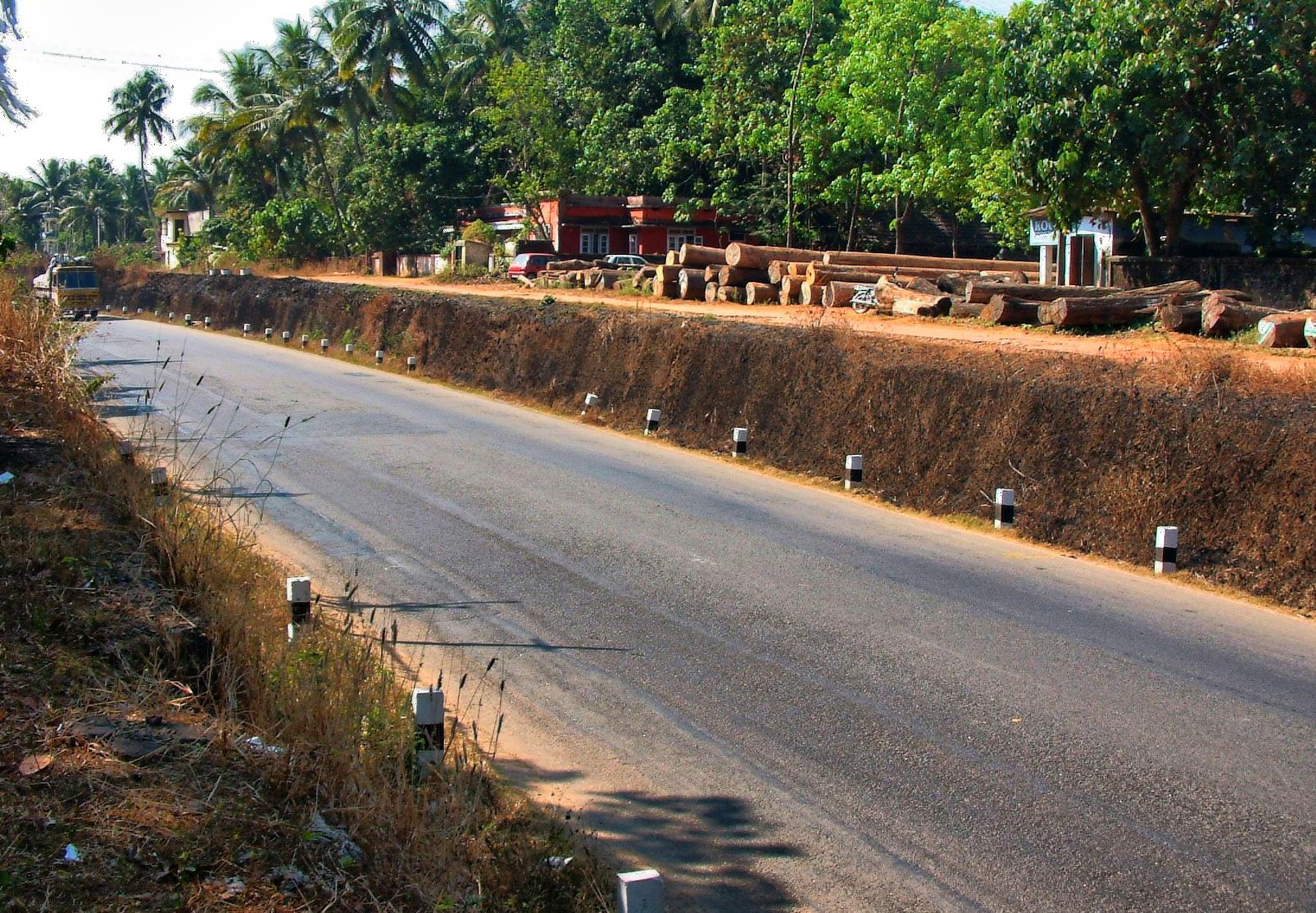
Kottamuri in Chalakudy where the Fort was breached. A national highway now passes right through it.

The fortification was constructed during the regime of Rama Varma Raja, popularly known as Dharma Raja of Travancore, and under the direct guidance and supervision of the then Prime Minister, Ayyappan Marthanda Pillai, and the then commander of the Travancore Army, the Dutch Captain D'Lenoy. This historic defence line was comparable to the Great Wall of China except that the latter was more ancient and greater in length. It was under the protective cover of this Nedumkotta that a small army of Travancoreans under the command of Raja Keshavadas defeated and frustrated near Alwaye a formidable army led by Tipu Sultan. Today there is no physical evidence of the historic Nedumkotta in the form of even ruins anywhere in the Chalakudy taluk-Konoor (Koratty Kizhakkummuri), Muringoor Thekkummury, Kadukutty, Kuruvilassery, Pallipuram and Poyya- through which it passed. Names of forts remains in Chettuva, Mullurkara, Thrissur and Enamanakkal. However, some place names having a reference to the historic fortification are still popular in the northern borders of the erstwhile Cochin and Travancore States – Krishnan Kotta (meaning Krishnan Fort), Kottamukku (fort corner), Kottamuri (part of a fort), Kottaparampu (fort land), Kotta Vazhi (fort road), Kottalaparampu (magazine ground), Palayam (cantonment), etc. It started from Pallipuram Kotta near the sea, touches Kottamukku, Krishnankotta and extended till the Foot hills of the Anamalai in the Western Ghats. The Chalakudy river and lagoon which falls on the alignment was left alone as they themselves were a barrier. A trench, 20 feet (6.1 m) deep and 16 feet (4.9 m) wide was built along the northern side of the wall for the full length. At some places the wall reached 50 ft (15 m) in height. Hollows were made inside where about 100 soldiers could hide and make an ambush. A company of soldiers was stationed about every kilometre with ammunition store house at strategic points. There were also caves in the nearby wells to hide in the possibility of an unannounced attack. Muringoor Kottamury (3 km south of Chalakudy) is the place where the NH47 crosses the Nedumkotta.

The places where fortification once stood is in the present Chalakudy Taluk in Thrissur District, Kerala.

== Attack of Tipu Sultan and its destruction ==
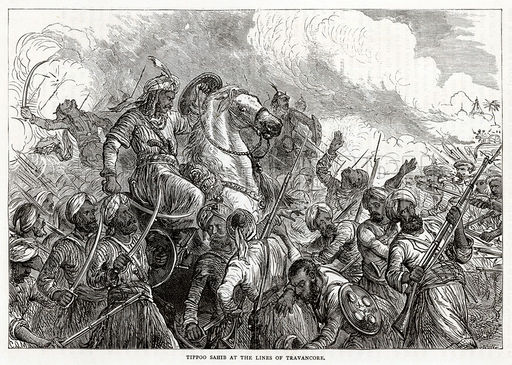
Tippu at the lines of Travancore by James Grant (c 1896)

24 years after his father, Hyder Ali had attacked Kochi, Tipu Sultan started on a conquest to conquer Kochi and Travancore. On the night between 28 and 29 December camped six miles northward of the lines. On 31 December, Tippu marched with 14,000 infantry and 500 frontiers in the night, guided by a native of the country. Before daybreak, he possessed a large extent of the rampart on the right side flank. By morning Sultan had come three miles in the inner side with his whole force without much opposition and he commanded his frontiers to level down the rampart into the 16 feet wide and 20 deep ditch which was a difficult task to be done. He then advanced without levelling the ditches and in one column, through a narrow passage. This move backfired on the Mysore army as it could not move freely. They were also ambushed by a small 20-member team of the Travancore army who returned heavy fire which killed the commander of the army and caused panic to ensue amongst them.

There was chaos and the Sultan himself fell into the ditch over dead corps by which it was almost filled. The Sultan was only saved by some strong soldiers, who raised him on their shoulders which enabled him to ascend the counterscarp. He fell twice in the attempt to clamber up and he was crippled for life due to the fall. He was then escaped to his tent in a dhuli. Humiliated by the defeat, he swore to remain in the tent until he took what was by then called by him as "the contemptible wall". The Mysore army suffered heavy casualties and army commanders like Semal Beg were killed. Tippu Sultan's palanquin, his seals, rings and personal ornaments and sword fell into the Dewaan's hands as trophies. These were forwarded to the Nawab of Arcot upon his request. Several officers and men were taken prisoners; of the former five were Europeans and one was a Maharashtrian.

English historians consider the attack to be unwarranted and unnecessary. Mark Wilks records that the Sultan was directly involved in the attack, that he suffered a leg injury and was crippled for life, and that his valuable jewelry was confiscated. However, based on the Mathilakam documents, A. P. Ibrahim Kunju evaluates that the Sultan was not directly involved. The Madras Governor, Mr. Holland, refused to help Travancore, because he thought that the Maharaja had acted unlawfully in purchasing the Dutch forts

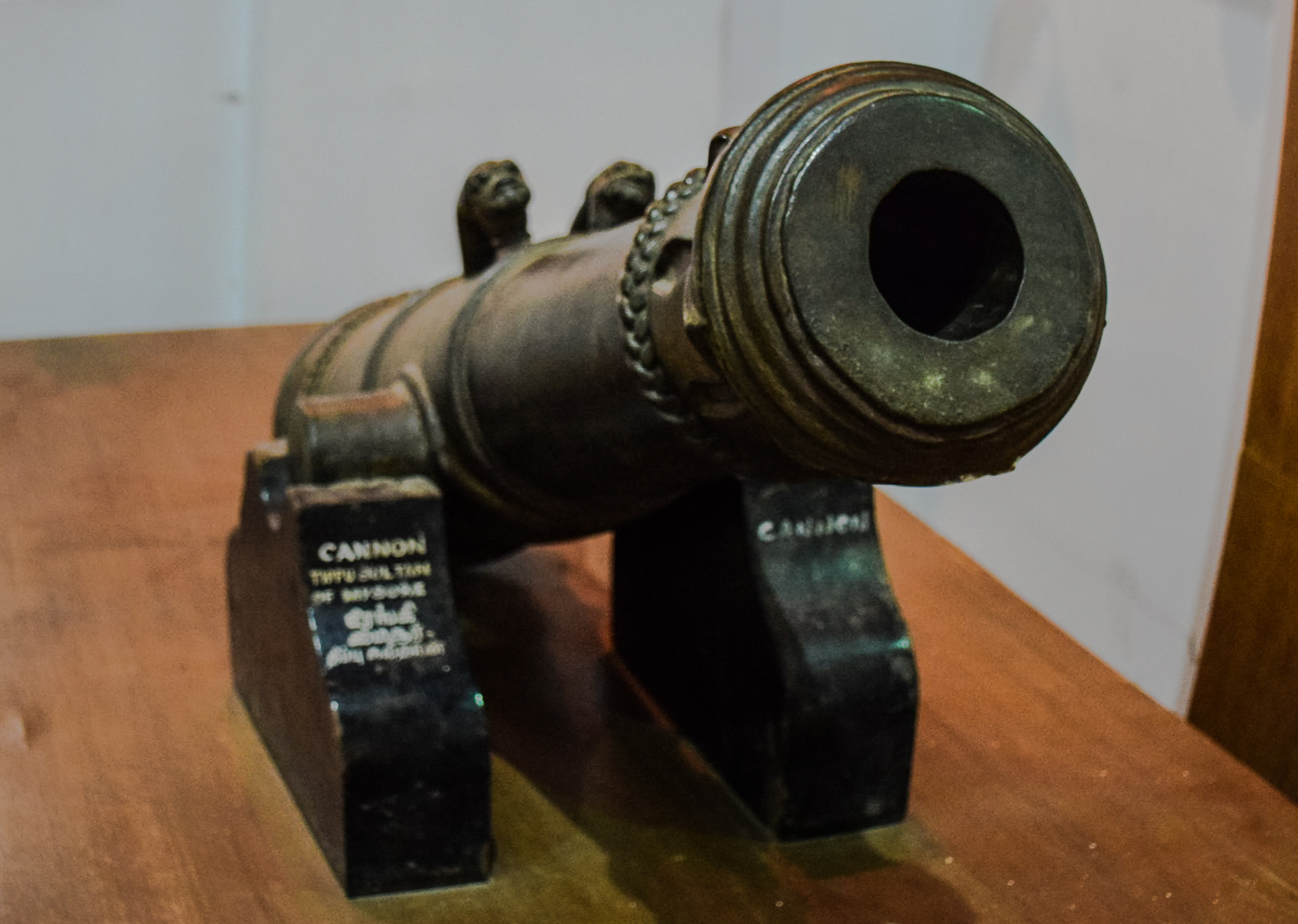
such small cannons were used by Tipu Sultan as it was easy to transport them

The Maharaja requested the Madras Governor to issue orders to the British army to co-operate with him in case of an attack from Tippu Sultan which was expected at any moment. Help was promised but was never rendered on time. On the second of March, Tippu once again started his attacks by a skirmish outside the wall and on the sixth of March, ordered his artillery to move forward. The wall sustained heavy fire from artillery for about a month but at last yielded a breach that was three quarters of a mile long. Later in April he came back with reinforcements and this time was able to break into the territory after making the way through the Nedumkotta. He destroyed the wall at Konoor kotaa or kottamuri and advanced further. He filled trenches for a few kilometres to enable his army to move forward.

The Travancore army found that resistance was useless, retreated and the Mysore army entered Travancore. The two battalions of the Army of East India company were just spectators without giving any aid to the Travancore army. Many portions of the wall were destroyed during war, others later eroded away due to heavy rains, and trenches were filled up. Most of the ruins that were left have also been lost due ignorance about the historical structure among the locals. There were also no memorials erected anywhere in Parur, Angamaly or Alwaye to honour the Dharma Raja, D'Lennoy who were the architects of the fort; or Raja Keshavadas under whose direct command a comparatively small army had defeated the invading army of Tipu Sultan.

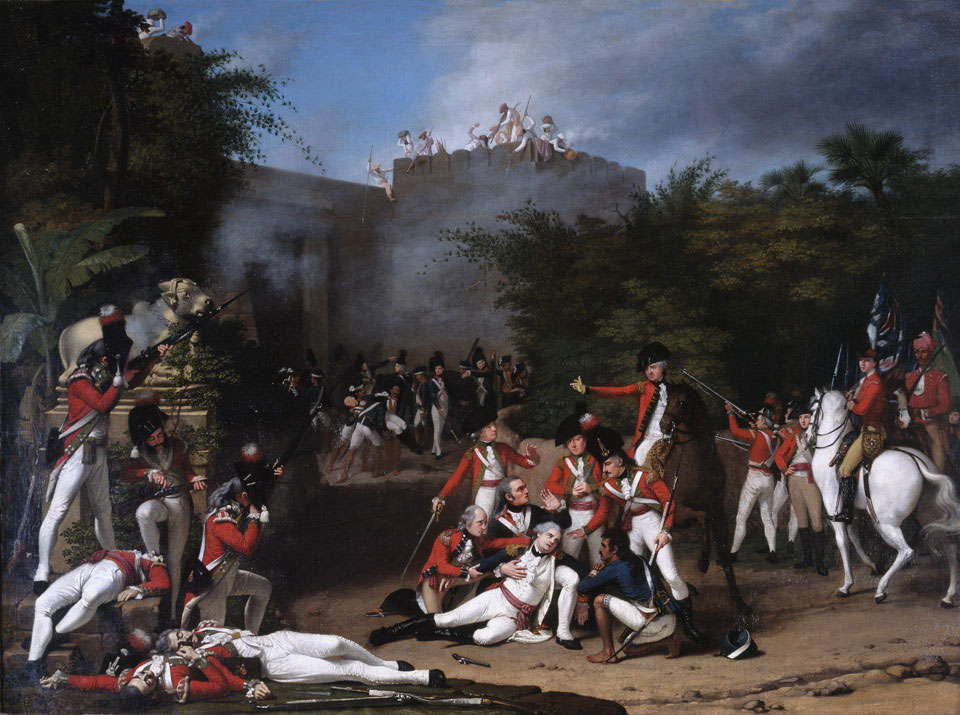
East India company besieging Bangalore

Tippu Sultan and his advancing army encamped for the night on the vast bed of the Periyar river at Alwaye, when some discreet men (his name kunjukutti palli broke dam and died ) of the Travancore army cut open a dam which had been erected across the river for agricultural purposes. A heavy torrent of water came downstream and washed away war materials and moistened the gunpowder meant for the cannons and artilleries. There were heavy casualties suffered by Mysore army that they found themselves in a confused frenzy. In the meantime, the East India Company along with its Travancore contingent fought in Coimbatore and was successful in taking down the forts. The company also attacked Srirangapattanam and Bangalore with the aid of Nawab of Arcot and Marathas. The company declared war on the Sultan in May 1790, which marked the beginning of the Third Anglo-Mysore War. Hearing the information that the British army was planning an attack on Srirangapatnam the Sultan retreated from Travancore. On 24 May 1790, Tippu Sultan marched back to save his kingdom on 24 May 1790.

== See also ==
- Mysorean invasion of Malabar

== Sources ==
1. Valath, V.V.K., Keralathile sthalacharithrangal – Thrissur Jilla(in Malayalam), Kerala Sahitya academy 1981. 2. Kerala Charitradharakal (Historical Documents) by Naduvattam Gopalakrishnan, pp. 84–89.

3. Thiruvithamkur Charitram (Travancore History) by P. Sankunni Menon, p. 161.

4. Kerala Charitram (Kerala History) by A. Sreedhara Menon, p. 55.

5. Malabar Manual by William Logan, p. 455.
