= Poopathy =

Poopathy may refer to:

- Annai Poopathy (1932–1988), Sri Lankan hunger striker
- Pooppathy, a village in Thrissur district, Kerala, India
