= Poyya =

- Village
- Location in Kerala, India Poyya (India)
- Country: India
- State: Kerala
- District: Thrissur

Government
  - Body: Poyya Panchayat

Population (2011)
  - Total: 10,478

Languages
  - Official: Malayalam, English
- Time zone: UTC+5:30 (IST)
- PIN: 680733
- Telephone code: 0480
- Vehicle registration: KL 47
- Nearest city: Mala
- Literacy: 88%
- Lok Sabha constituency: Chalakudy
- Vidhan Sabha constituency: Kodungallur

Poyya is a village in Thrissur district in the state of Kerala, India. The panchayath office is situated in Pooppathy. The distance from Poyya to Kodungallur is only 7 km and Poyya to Mala is 5 km. A part of Thrissur district ends at Poyya.

== Demographics ==
As of 2011 India census, Poyya had a population of 10478 with 5003 males and 5475 females.

== Transport ==
Major roads in Poyya:

- Kodungallur - Kodakara road
- Kodungallur - Airport road
- North Paravur - Mala road

== Education ==
Schools in Poyya:

- N.S.S.L.P School madathumpady
- A.K.M.H.S.S Poyya
- St. Mary's LP School
- AIM Law College Poyya
- St Thomas U P School poyya

== Hospital ==
- Government Hospital, Poyya
- Ayurveda clinic madathumpady

== Religious ==
Temples in Poyya:

- Madathikavu bhagavathy temple
- Madathumpady durga bhagavathy
- Karthikakkavu Bhagavathy Temple
- Narasimhaswamy Temple
- Vishnupuram SreeMahavishnuTemple
- Sree Bhairava Temple

Churches in Poyya:

- St. Sebastian's Church
- St. Ephraim's Church
- Christ The King Church
- Little flower Church
