= Krishnan Kotta =

Electoral ward in Poyya Grama panchayat, Kerala, India

Krishnankotta is a small village/hamlet in Kodungallur Taluk in Thrissur District of Kerala, India. It comes under Poyya Panchayath. It belongs to Central Kerala Division. It is located 39 km to the south of the district capital Thrissur. It is also 7 km from Mala and 237 km from the state capital Thiruvananthapuram.

Krishnankotta's pin code is 680733 and its postal sub office is Poyya. Krishnankotta is surrounded by Kodungallur Taluk to the west, and Chendamangalam Taluk, Vypeen Taluk and Paravur Taluk to the south. This place is on the border of Thrissur District and Ernakulam District. It is near the Arabian sea. There is a chance of humidity in the weather. It has abundance of fishes especially Karimeen which is the official fish of Kerala. Krishnankotta Church feast is a passion for its natives. Parishioners take it an opportunity to show their stage talents. Before the on set of Television, the stage programs during Church feast, give kind of Stardom for the performers.
