= Pooppathy =

- Village
- Country: India
- State: Kerala
- District: Thrissur

Languages
  - Official: Malayalam, English
- Time zone: UTC+5:30 (IST)
- Postal code: 680733
- Vehicle registration: KL-47
- Nearest city: Kodungallur
- Lok Sabha Constituency: Chalakudy

Pooppathy is a small village in Poyya Panchayath near Mala in the Thrissur district of Kerala, India. The Madathikkavu Bhagavathi Temple is located in Pooppathy.

== Location ==
Pooppathy is in Kodungallur Taluk, approximately 43.8 km (27.2 mi) from Thrissur. It is a largely self-sufficient village in terms of basic infrastructure and services.

== Temples ==
There are several temples in Pooppathy, including: Thankulam Siva Kshethram, Chulloor vishnu kshethram, Madathikkavu bhagavathi kshetram, Daivathingal, Chundanga parammbil annapoorneswary kshethram, choolakkal bhagavathy kshethram, Erimmal Sri Annapoorneswari Bhagavathy Kshethram, Tharakkal bhagavathy kshethram, and Durga Kshetram. Many of these teples have historical significance spanning several decades or centuries.

== Education ==
The major school in the village is ALPS primary school, Pooppathy, which is over 100 years old. It was founded by the late Shri. K.R. Karuppan of Kaimaparambil House, Pooppathy. There are also two libraries in Pooppathy, as the villahe falls under Poyya Panchayath.

== Festivals ==
Local festivals are associated with temples, churches, and national events. They serve as cultural gatherings, bringing together people from different communities and backgrounds.

The most prominent festival is Madathikavu Bhagavathys utsavam, celebrated on Makaram 7th and 8th of every January. The festival featured a procession of three caparisoned elephants, traditional drum ensembles, and fireworks. The temple also hosts Desavilakku Utsavam, a festival celebrated by two historically marginalised communities with equal participation.

Additionally, the 'Soyustar Soccer Fest' is a major local event, recently revived by Football enthusiasts, drawing participation from all age groups in the village.

== Economy ==
Pooppathy has a largely self-sufficient local economy. The village has a relatively large labour force, although there is a shortage of factories or production facilities to fully employ it. A significant portion of the population is employed in government service.

Local youth organize competitive exam coaching and career guidance programs, provided free of cost with support from Poyya Grama Panchayath.
