= Fortaleza da São Tomé =

Fort in Kottappuram, Kodungallur, Kerala, India

Coordinates: 10.197°N 76.212°E

- Kodungallur, Thrissur District, Kerala
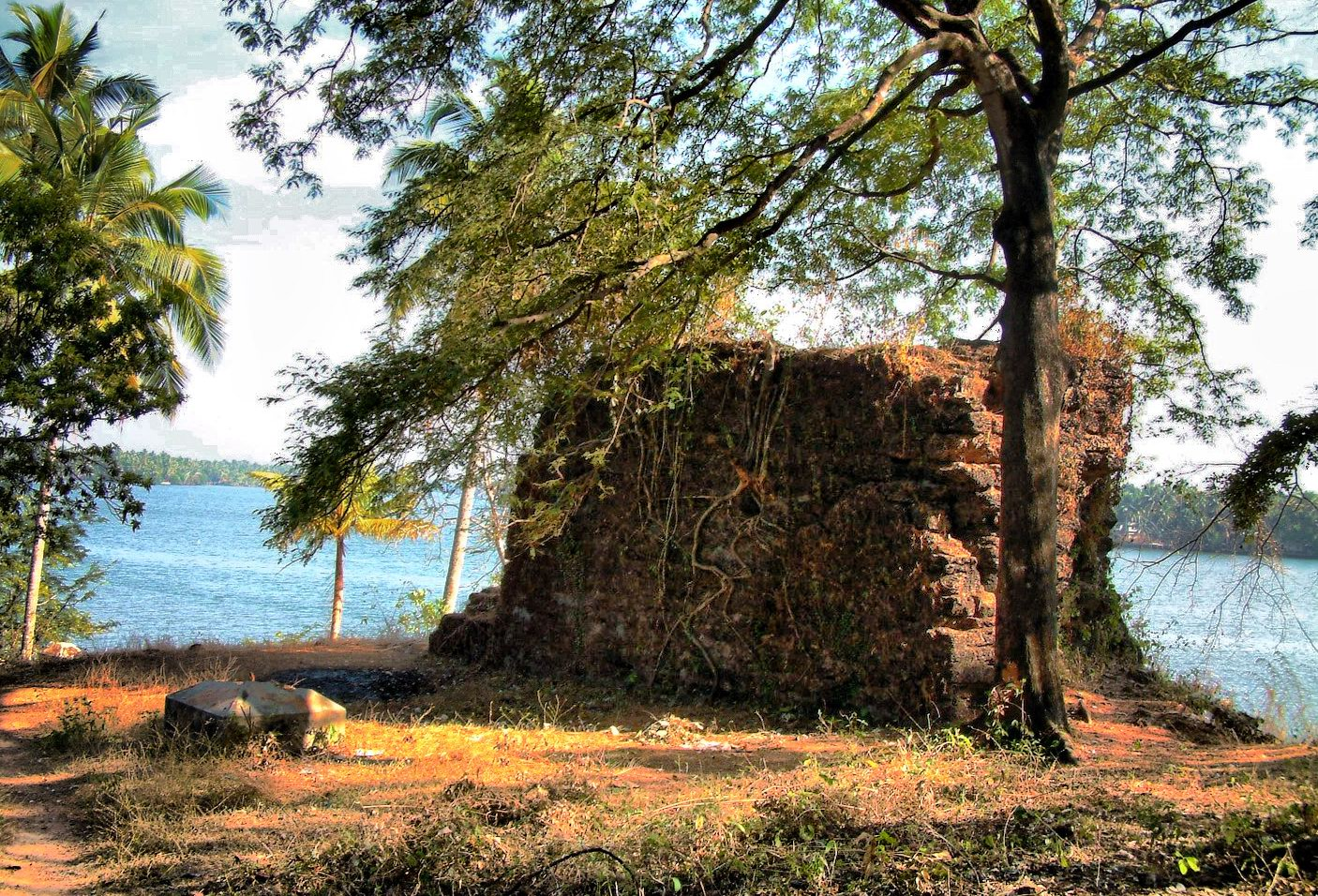

Site information
- Type: Cultural
- Owner: Government of Kerala
- Controlled by: Portugal; Netherlands; United Kingdom; India
- Open to the public: Yes
- Condition: Structure

Site history
- Built: 1523
- Materials: Stone
- Demolished: Mostly

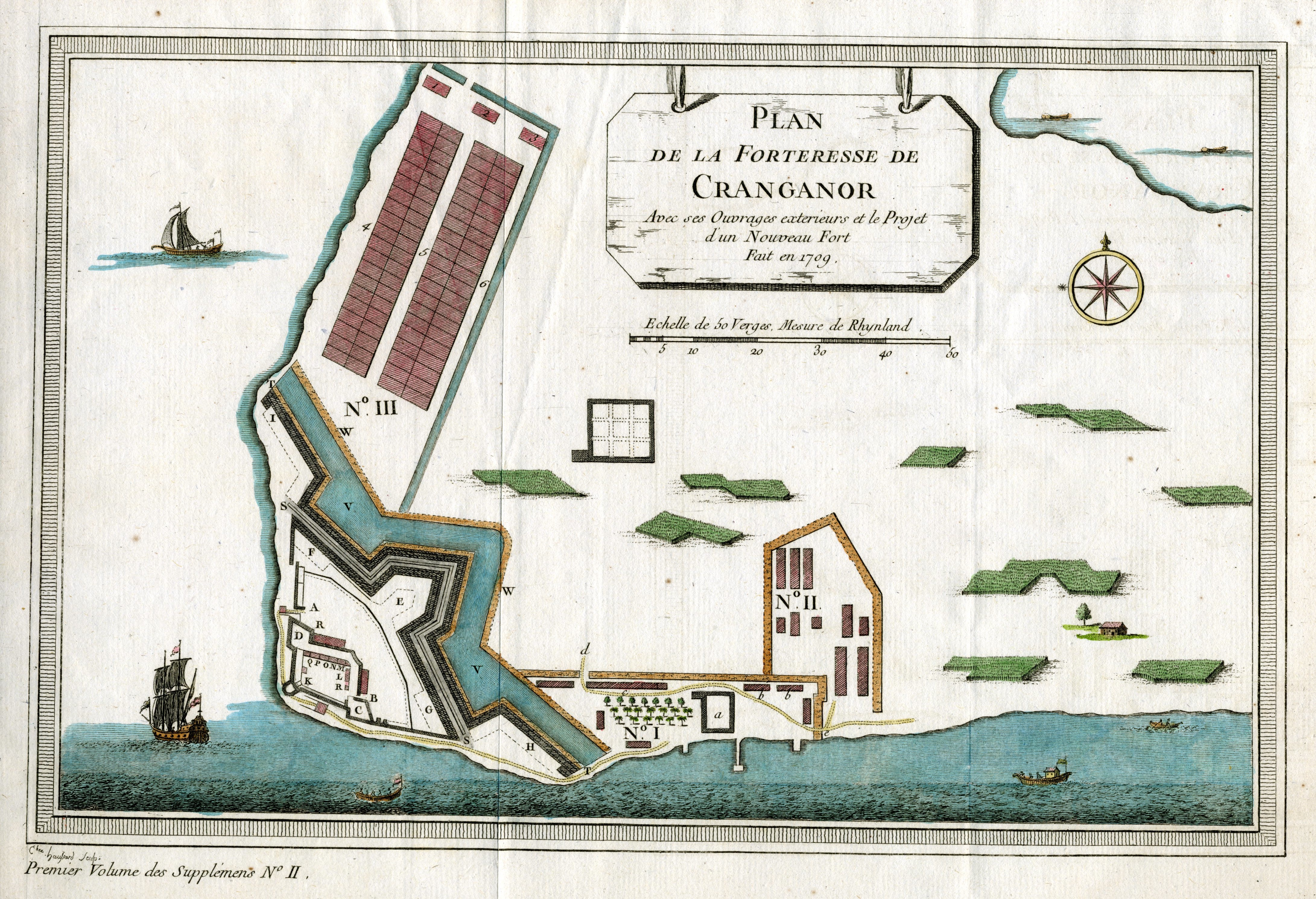
Plan of the fort

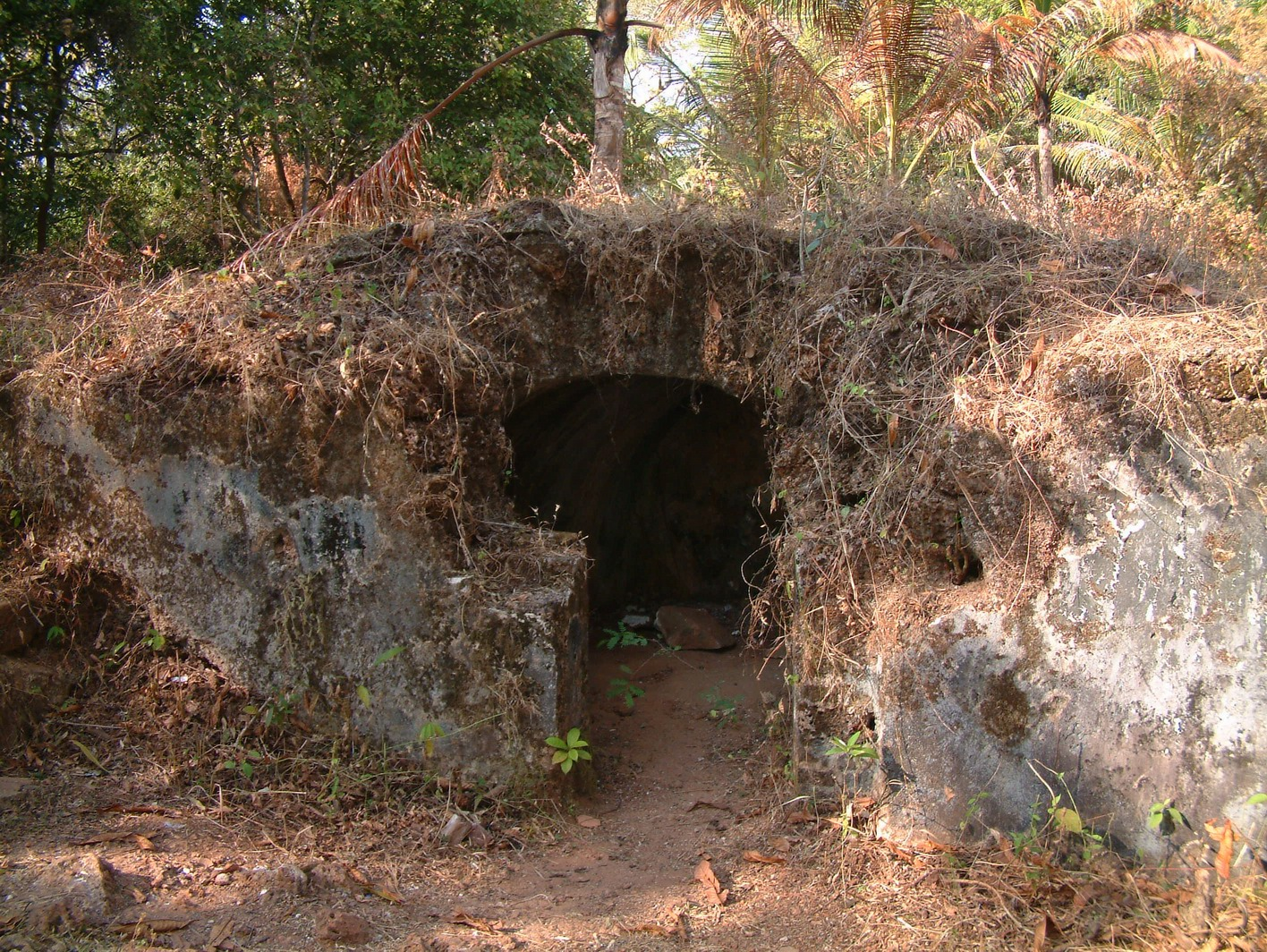
Battery

The Fortaleza da São Tomé, also known as Cranganore Fort or Kottapuram Fort, is situated in Kodungallur of Thrissur District in Kerala, India. It was of 18 feet in thickness and was made of laterite. The stone fort was built by the Portuguese in 1523 and was named after Thomas the Apostle. The fort was enlarged in 1565 and passed into the hands of the Dutch in 1663, who destroyed the fort.

Kottapuram Fort was an important part of the Nedumkotta fort built by Travancore under the leadership of Eustachius Benedictus de Lenoy to defend against Tipu Sultan.

== History ==
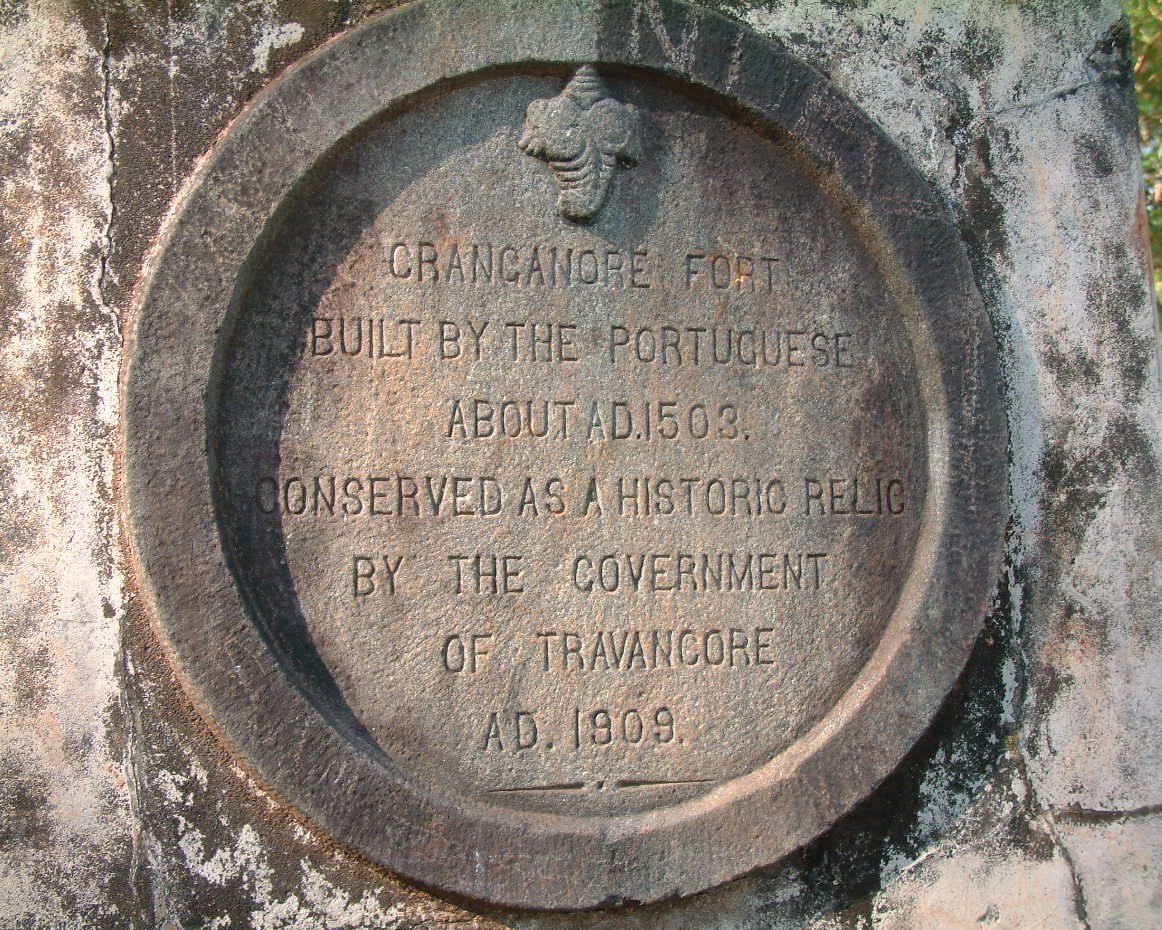
Department of Archaeology of Travancore erected a memorial pillar inside the fort in 1909

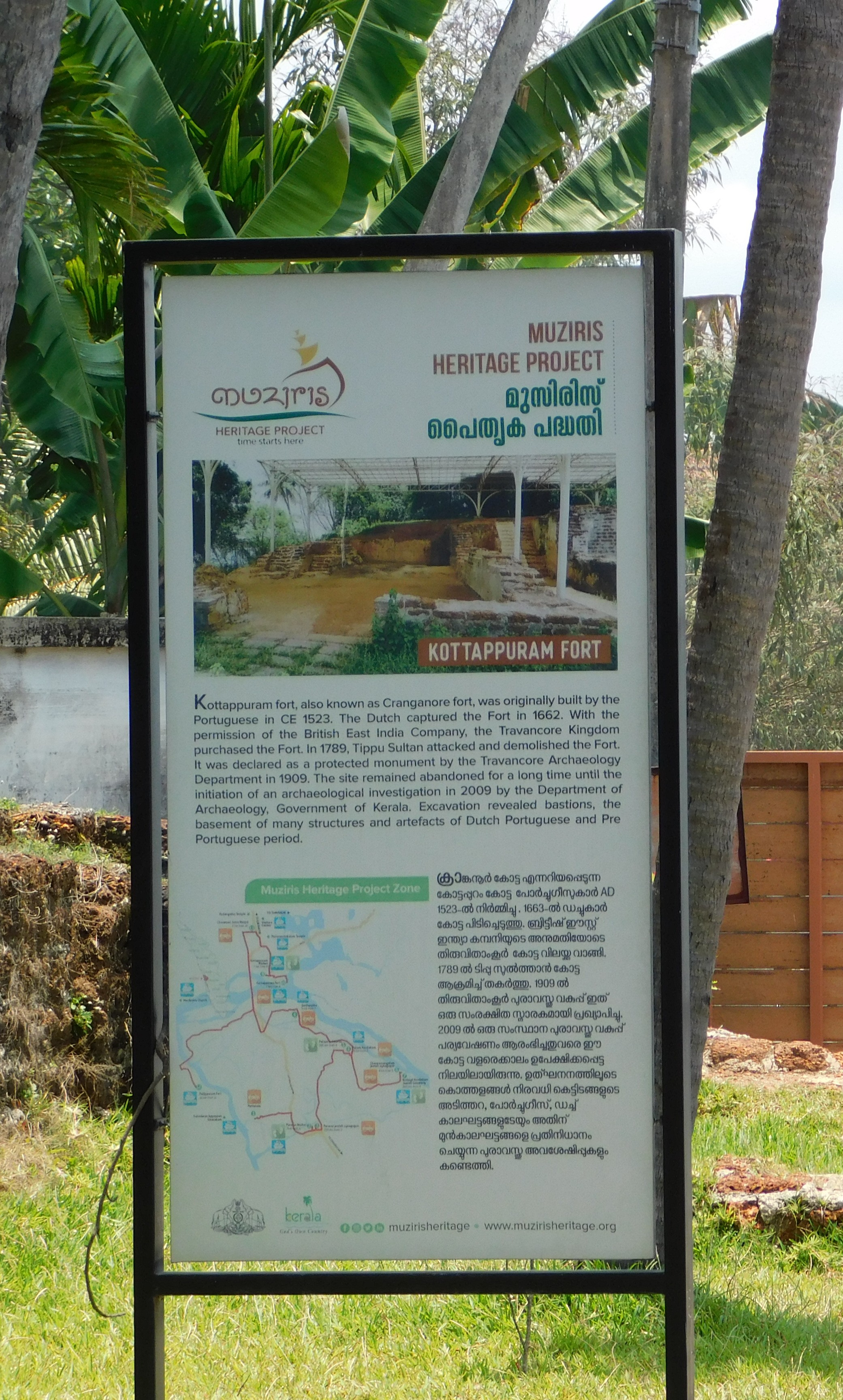
Description at the site

Kottappuram Fort, also known as Crangannoor (Kodungallur) Fort, was built by the Portuguese in 1523 and was named after Thomas the Apostle. It was later enlarged in 1565. It is located at a strategic location on the entrance of the Periyar River before it joins the Arabian Sea. Therefore, from the fort, it was easy to control the ships and boats passing to Kodungallur through this river. The fort was constructed under the supervision of Pedro Álvares Cabral and was under the command of Urbano Fialho Ferreira after the completion.

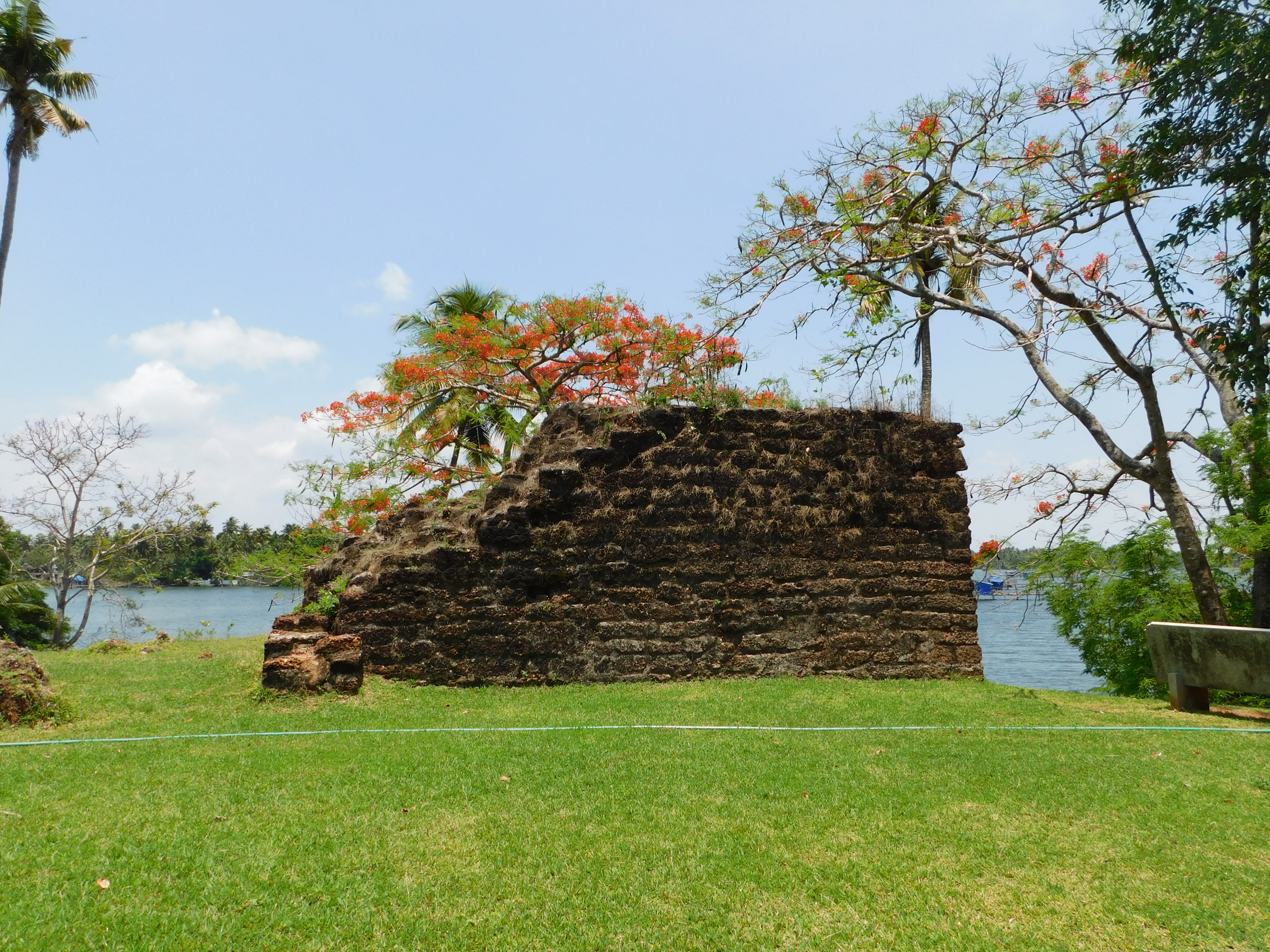
Remains of the wall of the fort

In 1663 Dutch Army conquered the fort after much struggle. In 1662 the Dutch besieged land and sea and began to build a tunnel near the fort. But they could not hold their own against the artillery of the Portuguese. The Dutch demanded a truce, but Fialho who was holding the fort, intensified the attack.

Later when Paliyattachan betrayed the Portuguese things became easy. Paliyattachan, who had strategically left the fort, met the Dutch and told them the easiest way to enter the fort. On 15 January 1662, the Dutch resumed their offensive. They were able to crack the fort with artillery and get in through it. After the Dutch army captured important parts of the fort, the Portuguese boarded boats and escaped to the Ambazhakkad seminary. Fialho, 200 Portuguese soldiers and about 100 Nair soldiers were killed. After taking over the fort, the Dutch destroyed it and used it as an outhouse to guard their trade ships.

However, during the reign of Tipu Sultan, when he conquered Malabar and targeted Travancore, Travancore began to fortify the fort. The king of Cochin was the feudatory lord of Mysore. On 31 July 1789, he bought the Kodungallur fort and the pallipuram fort from the Dutch for Rs. 3 Lakhs. The agreement was executed between Raja Kesava Das, the Diwan of Travancore and John Gerard Van Angelbeck, the Dutch governor. At the same time, Tipu Sultan was claiming the fort from the King of Cochin. The construction of Nedunkotta or the Travancore Lines is considered to be a unique and unparallel episode in Indian History by historians. Before moving on to a war, he wrote to Governor Holland to make a decision on the forts with the governor of Madras, an ally of Travancore, and sent Governor Powni to speak with the King. The Maharaja requested the Madras governor (Mr. Holland) to issue orders to the British contingent to co-operate with him in case of an attack from Tippu Sultan which was expected every moment. Aid was promised but not rendered. However, when things could not be settled amicably, the Mysore army attacked the upper part of Nedumkotta in December 1787 and captured a part of it. The Travancore army were initially dispersed but retaliated with increased vigor. The Mysore army suffered heavy casualties and retreated. Army commanders like Semal Beg were killed on the Mysore side.

English historians consider the attack to be unwarranted and unnecessary. Mark Wilks records that the Sultan was directly involved in the attack, that he suffered a leg injury and was crippled for life, and that his valuable jewelry was confiscated. However, based on the Mathilakam documents, A. P. Ibrahim Kunju evaluates that the Sultan was not directly involved. The Madras governor, Mr. Holland, refused to help Travancore, because he thought that the Maharaja had acted unlawfully in purchasing the Dutch forts

Unable to influence the King of Travancore in any way, from 12 April 1790, the Mysore army again attacked Nedumkotta. In many places they broke through the walls and advanced. The East India Company, on the other hand, refrained from aiding the king. The Kodungallur fort was captured and destroyed by the Mysore army on 7 May 1790. Mysore troops captured Aikotta, Paravur and Kuryappilly one by one and advanced towards Aluva. At the same time, however, the Sovereign Government of Bengal considered declaring war on the Sultan's Company through this war and considered another alliance with the Nizam and the Marathas in Mysore. The Company declared war on the Sultan in May 1790. This was the beginning of the Third Anglo-Mysore War. Upon learning of this, the Mysore Army withdrew from Kerala and went back to Srirangapatnam.

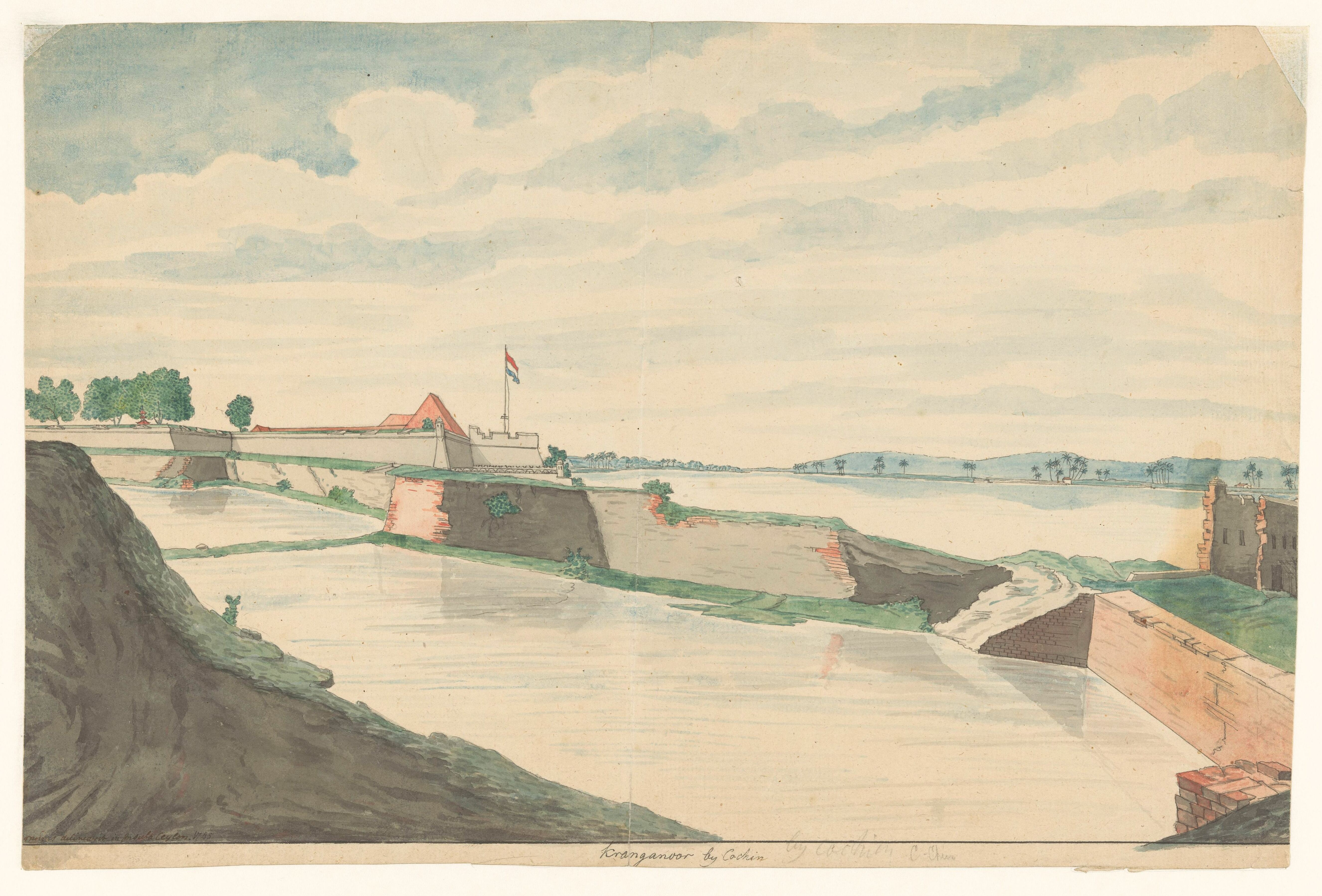
Dutch Fort Kranganoor, ca. 1785.

== See also ==
- Mysore invasion of Kerala
- Portuguese forts in India
- Media related to Cranganore Fort at Wikimedia Commons
