= Moolampilly =

- Locality
- Interactive map of Moolampilly
- Coordinates: 10.03943°N 76.26384°E
- Country: India
- State: Kerala
- District: Ernakulam
- Talukas: Kanayannur

Government
  - Body: Kadamakkudy Panchayat

Area
  - Total: 1.5 km^{2} (0.58 sq mi)

Languages
  - Official: Malayalam, English
- Time zone: UTC+5:30 (IST)
- PIN: 682027
- Telephone code: 0484
- Lok Sabha constituency: Ernakulam
- Nearest city: Ernakulam/Kochi

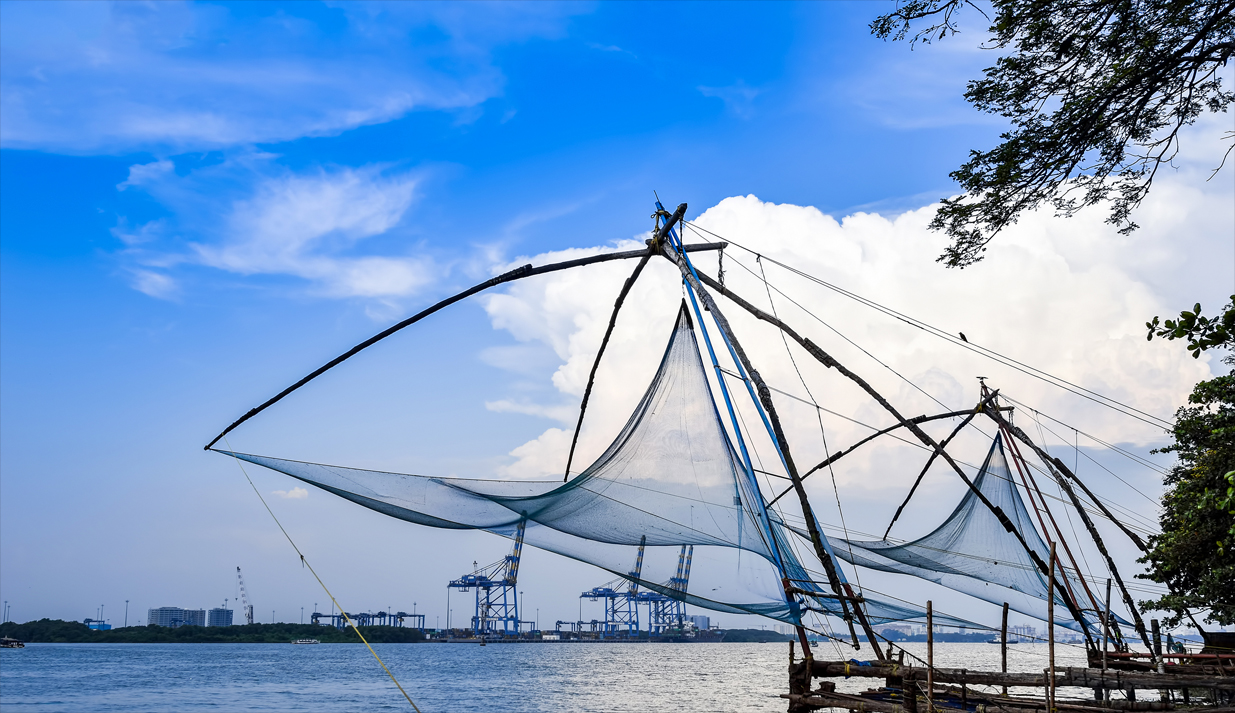
Chinese fishing nets

Moolampilly is an Island in Kochi surrounded by river Periyar. It is a part of Kadamakkudy grama panchyath, Kanayannur Taluk, Ernakulam District in the Indian state of Kerala. The Word " Moolampilly" is derived from the Portuguese word " Molambo" means Rag. The Portuguese people created the christian community in moolampilly island. Portuguese heritage is still over there. Moolampilly is famous for the handmade earthenpots and Tandoori ovens. Moolampilly Kaliman (Clay) Society was formed in 1962.

Several residents of Moolampilly were evacuated for the Vallarpadam Transship Container Terminal Project. The State Government settled all outstanding issues regarding the rehabilitation package on 6 June 2011.

Four bridges, including the Moolampilly - Pizhala bridge, are to be constructed to connect the islanders to the mainland.
