= Arakkunnam =

- town
- Location in Kerala, India
- Coordinates: 9°54′3″N 76°23′24″E
- Country: India
- State: Kerala
- District: Ernakulam

Government
  - Body: Edakkattuvayal and Mulanthuruthy Panchayath

Population (2001)
  - Total: 12,302

Languages
  - Official: Malayalam, English
- Time zone: UTC+5:30 (IST)
- PIN: 682313
- Telephone code: 0484
- Vehicle registration: KL-39
- Nearest city: Ernakulam
- Civic agency: Edakkattuvayal and Mulanthuruthy Panchayath

Arakkunnam is a small town in Ernakulam district of Kerala. Nearby Piravom. It is about 25 km (16 mi) south-east of Kochi city. It comes under the Edakkattuvayal and Mulanthuruthy panchayats and Kanayannur Taluk administration.

== Education ==
- Toc H Institute of Science and Technology
- St. George High School, Arakkunnam
- St. George LP School, Arakkunnam

== Entertainment ==
- PAN Cinemas Arakkunnam

== Healthcare ==
- Govt. Health Center, Arakkunnam
- AP Varkey Mission Hospital

== Places of worship ==
- St. George's Jacobite Syrian Valiyapally, Arakkunnam
- St. Joseph Church Arakkunnam
- Oozhacode Sree Krishna Swami Temple
