= Amballur, Ernakulam =

Amballur
- village
- Location in Kerala, India Amballur (India)
- Coordinates: 9.8574800°N 76.400920°E
- Country: India
- State: Kerala
- District: Ernakulam

Population (2011)
  - Total: 11,358

Languages
  - Official: Malayalam, English
- Time zone: UTC+5:30 (IST)
- PIN: 682315
- Nearest city: Kochi
- Climate: tropical (Köppen)

Amballur is a suburban region of Kochi in the Indian state of Kerala.

== Demographics ==
As of 2011 India census, Amballur had a population of 11358 with 5537 males and 5821 females.

== Location ==
Amballoor is located about 20 km from downtown Kochi. It is a part of the Amballoor Panchayath, which forms the southern edge of the Ernakulam district. It is situated along the Ernakulam-Thalayolaparambu main road.

Amballoor Pallithazham is the main junction of Amballoor. Main temples in this area are Amballur Kavu and Koote Kavu, both of which are Bhagavati. Amballoor Thrikkovu is another main temple; it is a Krishna temple. The St. Francis Assisi Syro-Malabar Catholic Church, established in 1810, is at this junction. The St. Francis UP is the first school in this place. The school celebrated its centenary year recently.

Perumpilly, Arakkunnam, Kanjiramattom, Edakkattuvayal are a few places adjacent to Amballoor.
