= Kerala Library Association =

Professional association for librarians in Kerala

- 8.481954643272806°N 76.96626672417875°E
- Location: Thiruvananthapuram, India
- Established: 1972

The Kerala Library Association (KLA) was founded in 1972 by a group of librarians who strongly felt the need for an independent professional association at the state level to promote the cause of library development, professional standards of librarians, entirely dedicated for libraries and librarians. The Headquarters of the association is at Thiruvananthapuram. Prof. K. A. Isaac was the patron of the association.

The association has boldly voiced the sentiments and the views of professionals on several occasions to the concerned authorities. It has successfully projected the need for improving library services in College & Universities. KLA helped the Government to formulate policies in relation to library development in the state.

== Origin ==
The first attempt at founding a professional association took place in 1958 by the initiative of a few trained librarians who formed the All Kerala College Librarians Association. In 1961, the University of Kerala opened a new department to offer bachelor's degree in Library science. Subsequently, when the number of degree holders began to increase, it led to the formation of another association called Kerala Librarians Association in 1964 at Thiruvananthapuram.

Later in 1971 the present association was renamed as Kerala Library Association, and thus it was registered under the Societies Registration Act and it became the first legitimate organization of the professional librarians in the state of Kerala.

== Objectives ==
- To unite all libraries in Kerala by holding conferences and meetings for the discussion of questions affecting the library profession and matters affecting libraries or their regulation or management or other wise.
- To promote library movement and improvement in library services.
- To promote appropriate library legislation in the state.
- To promote the better administration of libraries.
- To promote library science education and the improvement in the training of librarians in Kerala.
- To promote and encourage bibliographical study and research.
- To promote the establishment of libraries, documentation and information centres in Kerala.
- To publish information of service or interest to the members of the association or for the promotion of the objects of the association.
- To promote whatever may tend to the improvement of the position and qualifications of the librarians.
- To affiliate to the association, other associations in Kerala with similar objects.
- To co-operate with other State, National, International and other organizations with similar objects.
- To do all such other things as incidental or conducive to the attainment of the above-mentioned objects.

== Membership ==
Membership of the association is of four categories.

(a) Ordinary Membership

Ordinary Membership is open to all librarians who satisfy the required minimum qualifications viz. a basic bachelor's degree with a Degree/Diploma in Library Science, subscribe to the objects of the association and pay an admission fee of Rs.10/- and an annual subscription of Rs.100/-

(b) Associate Membership

Associate Membership is open to students undergoing a course of study leading to a Degree/Diploma in Library Science, subscribe to the objects of the association and pay an admission fee of Rs.10/- and annual subscription of Rs.25/-

(c) Honorary Membership

Honorary Membership is granted to eminent personalities in the field of library profession, service and teaching.

(d)Life Membership

Life Membership is open to all librarians who satisfy the required minimum qualifications viz. a basic bachelor's degree with a Degree/Diploma in Library Science, subscribe to the objects of the association and pay an admission fee of Rs.10/- and a life membership fee of Rs.600/- (Rupees Six Hundred) either in full or in two installments, i.e., RS.300/-falling within the period of the same financial year of the association.

== Publications ==
KLA publishes KLA Newsletter which is distributed free to all its members. So far the association has published five research monographs, many seminar volumes, two souvenirs and 5 books. Read the current issue of KLA Newsletter

== Programmes ==
KLA conducts seminars, computer training programs, conferences and workshops every year for the library professionals. The subject matter of these include technical & professional topics, library development plans, library legislation, library awareness, promotion of reading habits and role of libraries for national development. Public functions & meetings are also organized by KLA off and on. KLA in association with State Library Council had launched a training programme for working librarians in rural libraries of Kerala during 1996-97.

=== Major activities since 2011 ===
i. KLA National Seminar on "New Information Technology Interfaces in Libraries and Information Centres (NITILIC)", 12–13 July 2013, Seminar Hall, Kerala State Science and Technology Museum, PMG Jn., Thiruvananthapuram.

ii. National Seminar on "Professional Motivation for Librarians" on 22 June 2013, Organized by KLA Thrissur Region in association with the College of Horticulture (CoH), Kerala Agricultural University (KAU), Thrissur.

iii. Orientation Programme on "Academic Communication and Plagiarism" at S. B. College, Changanacherry on 8 June 2013, organized by KLA Kottayam Region in association with S.B. College, Changanacherry. iv. KLA Gold Medal & Prof. C. A. Augustine Holy Cross Endowment Awards 2013, on 29 April 2013 at 3.00 pm at the Lecture Hall, DLIS, University of Kerala, Thiruvananthapuram.

v. Two Day Training cum Workshop on "Koha" during 7–8 March 2013, jointly organized by KLA Ernakulam Region and the School of Library and Information Science, Rajagiri College at Rajagiri College School of Social Sciences, Kalamassery, Kochi

vi. One Day Workshop on DSpace Digital Library, 19 January 2013 at Seminar Hall, Kerala University of Fisheries and Ocean Studie, Pangad, Kochi, organized by KLA Ernakulam Region.

vii. 8th Prof. K. A. Isaac Commemoration Lecture (2012), by Dr M.D. Baby, Prof. & Head, School of Library and Information Science, Rajagiri College of Social Sciences, Kochi on the topic New Generation Knowledge Management: A Challenge to Library Professionals, organized jointly by KLA and the Department of Library & Information Science, University of Kerala on 20 December 2012 at 11.00 am at the Lecture Hall, DLIS, University of Kerala, Thiruvananthapuram.

viii. Seminar on "Public Relations in Libraries" on 15 Dec. 2012 at 2.30 pm at Government Training College (IASE), Palace Road, Thrissur, organized by KLA Thrissur Region.

ix. Half Day Workshop on Information Security Awareness on 1 Dec. 2012 at the DLIS Lecture Hall, Kerala University Library, Palayam, Thiruvananthapuram, organized by KLA State Committee in collaboration with C-DAC, Hyderabad.

x. Invited Talk on "Re-engineering Library Services" by Dr. M.D. Baby, Professor and Head, DLIS, Rajagiri College of Social Sciences on 16 Nov. 2012, at MG Uni. Library Hall, organized by KLA Kottayam Region.

xi. Invited Talk on "Impact of Mass media on Reading" by Mrs Priya A.S., famous Malayalam novelist and short story writer on 21 Nov. 2012 at Library Hall, CUSAT, Cochin, organized by KLA Ernakulam Region.

xii. Seminar on "Technology Management in Modern Libraries" on 20 October 2012 at the Seminar Hall, College of Horticulture, Thrissur, organized jointly by KLA Thrissur Region and College of Horticulture, Kerala Agricultural University, Thrissur.

xiii. KLA-NIC National Workshop on E-Granthalaya, 11–13 September 2012, LBS Institute of Science & Technology, Thiruvananthapuram.

xiv. Linux Training Programme for LIS Professionals and Students, 18 August 2012, St. Joseph's College of Engineering and Technology, Palai, Kottayam, by KLA Kottayam Region.

xv. Talk on "Intellectual Property Rights: A Public Perspective" by Adv. Binoy K. Kadavan (High Court of Kerala) on 10 July 2012 at the Ernakulam Public Library Hall. Jointly organized by the Kerala Library Association (Ernakulam Region) and Ernalulam Public Library.

xvi. Reading Day 2012: Talk on "Reading, Madness and Culture" by Dr P.K.Rajasekharan, Literary critic and Media Person, 3 pm, 19 June 2012, DLIS Hall, University Library Building, Palayam, Thiruvananthapuram

xvii. Seminar on "Library and Web Tools for E-Learning and Teaching", 25 June 2012, Library Hall, College of Horticulture, Vellanikkara, Thrissur, KLA Thrissur Region.

xviii. Three Day Workshop on KOHA (Batch II), 24–26 May 2012, Calicut University Library, KLA Kozhikkode Region.

xix. Career orientation Programme for Library and Information Science (LIS) Students, 12 May 2012, KE College Mannanam, KLA Kottayam Region.

xx. Three Day Workshop on KOHA, 26–29 April 2012, Calicut University Library, KLA Kozhikkode Region.

xxi. Seminar on "Knowledge Economy and Library Professionals", 21 April 2012, Govt Institute of Advanced Study in Education, Thrissur, organized KLA Thrissur Region.

xxii. Prof. K.A.Isaac Commemoration Lecture 2011 by Shri T. P. Sreenivasan IFS (Retd) on the topic "Education for a changing world", 2 Dec. 2011, DLIS, University of Kerala, Trivandrum.

For details visit KLA Website

== Awards ==
In order to encourage the students who undergo Graduate and Post Graduate Courses in Library and Information Science, KLA has instituted Gold medal awards to the first rank holders in Kerala, Calicut and Mahatma Gandhi Universities. KLA also gives away Holy Cross Endowment instituted by Prof. C.A. Augustine for the toppers.

== Key office bearers for 2023-2025 ==
- President - Dr K. P. Vijayakumar, Formerly Associate Professor & Head, DLIS, University of Kerala
- General Secretary - Dr. P K Suresh Kumar, Assistant Librarian ( Sel. grade), Kerala University Library, Thiruvananthapuram.
- Treasurer- Dr. Arunkumar V R, Assistant Librarian Grade II, Kerala University Library Thiruvananthapuram-04

View the detailed list of Office bearers
