= Pizhala =

River island in Kerala, India

- Island
- Interactive map of Pizhala
- Coordinates: 10.048705°N 76.258225°E
- Country: India
- State: Kerala
- District: Ernakulam
- Talukas: Kanayannur

Languages
  - Official: Malayalam, English,
- Time zone: UTC+5:30 (IST)
- PIN: 682027 (Pizhala P.O.)
- Telephone code: 0484
- Lok Sabha constituency: Ernakulam
- Nearest city: Ernakulam/Kochi
- Legislative Constituency: Vypeen
- Website: nil

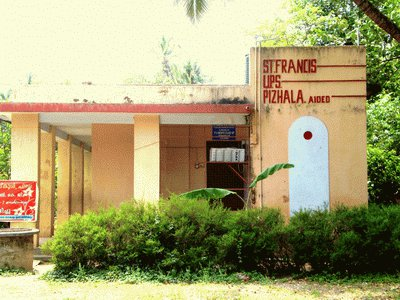
Pizhala U P School

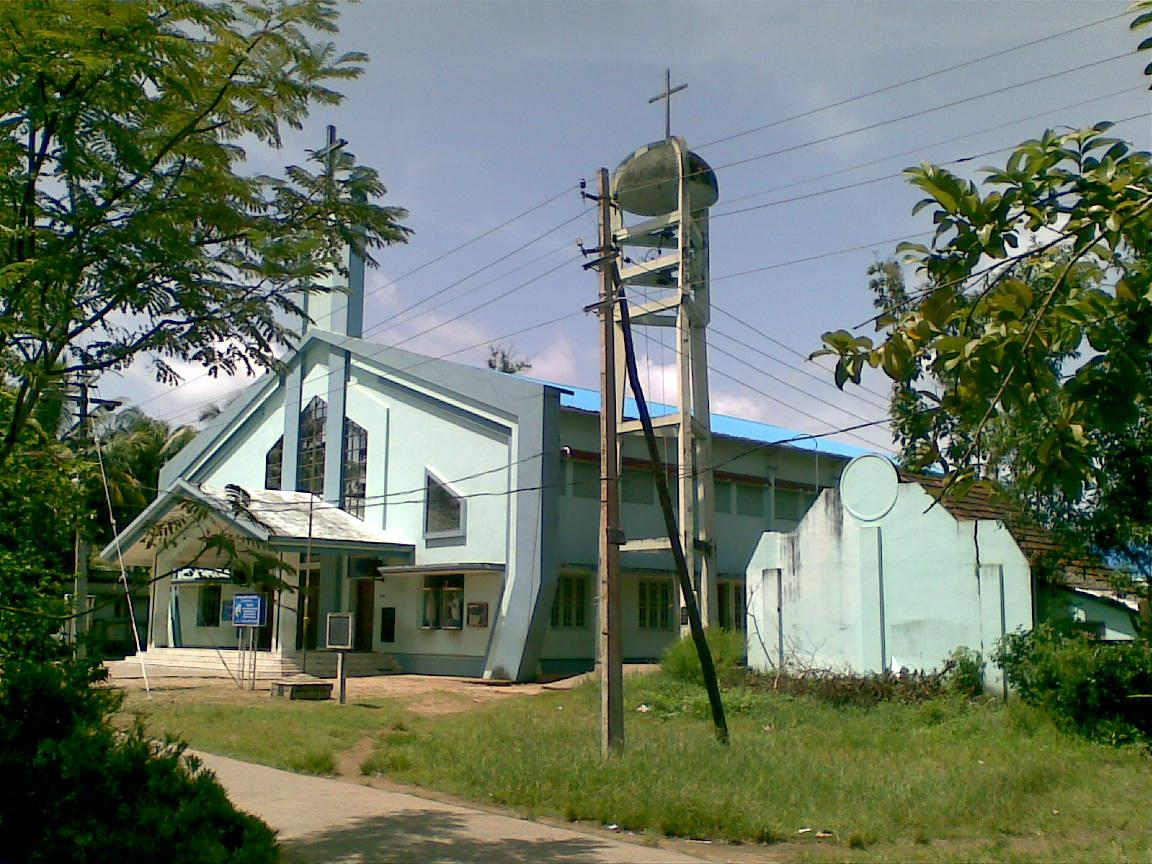
Catholic church in Pizhala

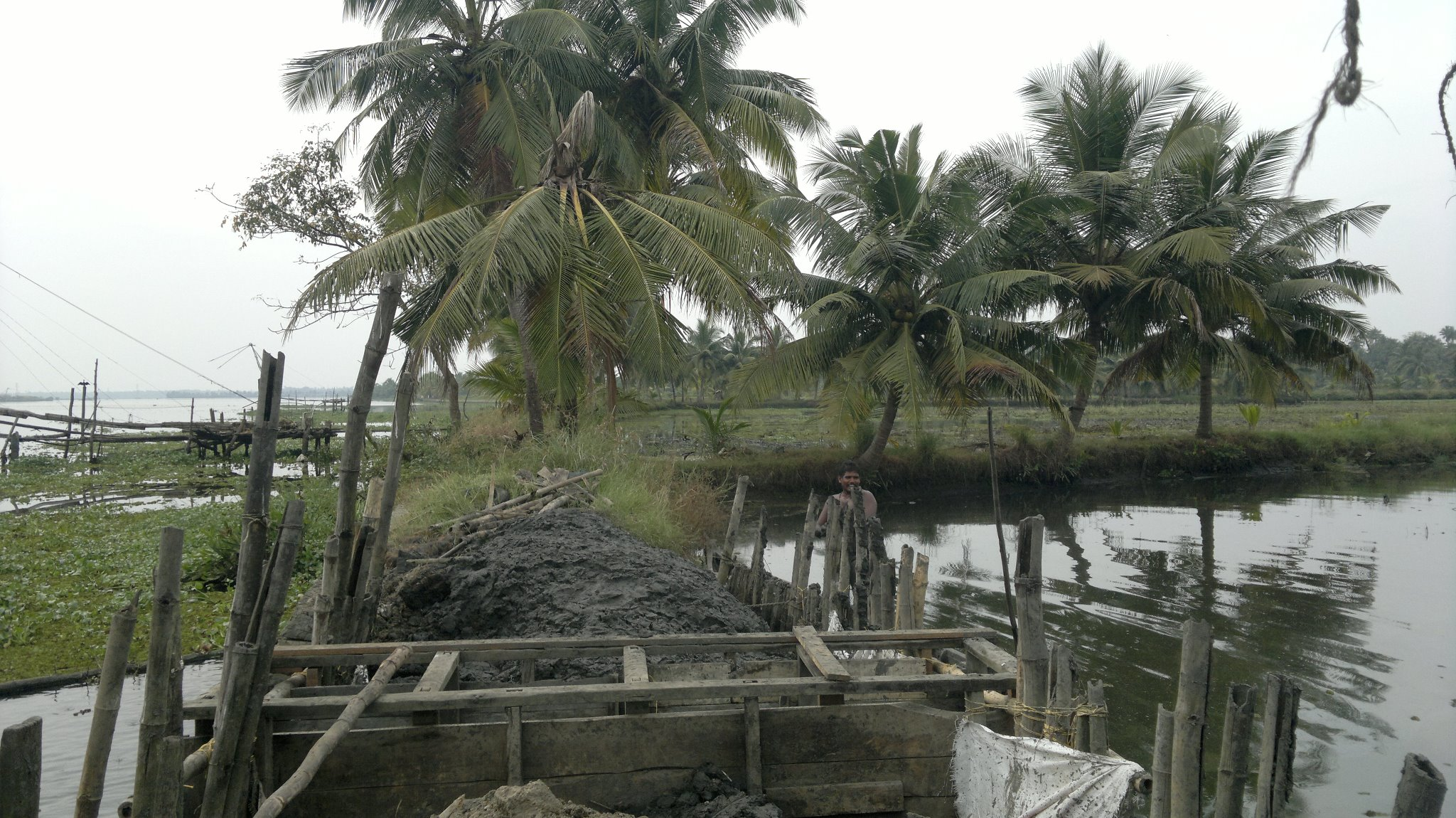
Pokkali Field preparing for fish farming

Pizhala is an island village, one among the fourteen islands of Kadamakkudy archipelago, located near to the main land of the city Ernakulam. The island is surrounded by tributaries of river Periyar. Pizhala island is part of Kadamakkudy village of Kanayannur taluk in Ernakulam district in the state of Kerala, India.

Pizhala island was formed during the great floods of Periyar happened during 1341 CE, which choked the Muziris port (near Pattanam, N. Paravur), one of the greatest ports in Ancient World.

There is an argument that the name Pizhala is derived from the Portuguese words paz na ilha, which mean 'peace on island'.

== History ==
=== 1341 ===
The island was formed in the great floods of Periyar happened during 1341 CE along with many islands like Vypin.

=== 1859 ===
In 1859, due to order of The Vicariate of Verapoly Archbishop Bernardo (Giuseppe) Baccinelli, OCD, OCD Catholic missionaries constructed first school (Pallikkoodam) in Pizhala.

=== 2020 ===
The Moolampilly-Pizhala bridge was opened for the public on 22 June 2020, by then Chief Minister Pinarayi Vijayan, which was a historic moment for the transportation history of the Island. It greatly reduced the travel woes of the islanders, till then they mainly depended ferry services, boat services for commuting other areas. The bridge connecting Moolampilly on the NH 966A (Container Road) with Pizhala and Cheriya Kadamakudy.

== Geography ==
The island is surrounded by Kothad and Chennur on eastern side, Chariyamthuruthu and Valiya Kadamakkudy on northern side, Murikkal and Cheriya Kadamakkudy on western side and Moolampilly on northern side. Geographically, the island lies at 10°02'52.1"N of latitude and 76°15'26.7"E of longitude. Major portion of the island is wetland / paddy field (Pokkali). The island has two major land parcel which are located in East side and North-West side. East side is known as Pizhala main land and North-West side is known as Paliyamthuruthu.

== Soil ==
The soils are hydromorphic, often underlain by potential sacid-sulphate sediments with unique hydrological conditions. Soils are mostly acid-saline.

== Culture ==
Jerry Amaldev stayed in Pizhala in his boyhood days. His uncle Fr. Joseph Moonjappilly was the parish priest of St. Francis Xavier's Church, Pizhala.

Before 2010, Pizhala has only two wards one is Pizhala South and Pizhala North. Paliyam Thuruth was included in Pizhala North Ward.

Kadamakkudy LSG Ward Members in Pizhala Before 2010
No	Ward Member Pizhala South	Ward Member Pizhala North	Duration
1	Mr. E M Sebastian Ward Member	Raman Master	1963-1979
2	Mr. E D Joseph Ward Member	Mr. P R Vijayan	1979-1984
3	Mr. E A Francis Ward Member	Mr. Purushothaman	1990-1995
4	Mr. E D Xavier	Mr. Suresh	1995-2000
5	Mrs. Valsa Francis	Mrs. RajaLakshmi	2000-2005
6	Mr. E A Francis	Mr. Santhosh Kumar (Resigned) &	2005-2010

In 2010, Pizhala has divided into three wards, They are Pizhala South, Pizhala North and Paliyam Thuruth.

Kadamakkudy LSG Ward Members in Pizhala After 2010
No	Ward Member Pizhala South	Ward Member Pizhala North	Ward Member Paliyam Thuruth	Duration
1	Valsa Francis	Mrs. Sheeba James(Disqualified) & Mrs. Sofi Manoj	Mrs. Rajani Pradeepkumar	2010-2015
2	Mr. Cerine Xavier.P	Mr. Benny Xavier	Mr.V K Prakasan	2015–2020
3	Mrs. Liasamma Jacob	Mrs. Jiya Joseph	Mrs. Rajani Pradeepkumar	2020 - Till Date

Other LSG Ward Members from Pizhala
No	Higher Authority	Name	Duration
1	Cheranalloor Panchayath	P R Lakshamanan	-
2	Edappally Block Panchayath	E D Xavier	2005 - 2010
3	Ernakulam District Panchayath	V V Joseph Master	-

== Education ==
"Pallikoodam" established and Davassy Assan was the first teacher. It upgraded and is now known as St Francis UP School. Students from Pizhala, Moolampilly and Chennur are studying here. Celebrated centenary of school in March 2020. There are three Anganawadis in Pizhala Island. One is near to St. Francis UP school, Second one is located near to Sree Vaishanava Temple and the last one is at Paliyamthuruth.

Head Masters /Mistress of St. Francis School Pizhala.
No	Name of Head Master/Mistress	Duration
1	Shree. Kumara Menon Master	-
2	Shree. Kakko Master	-
3	Shree. E M Francis Master	-
4	Shreemathi. E M Mary Teacher	-
5	Shree. E F Francis Master	-
6	Shree. K N Antony Master	-1999
7	Shreemathi. K V Elsy Teacher	-
8	Shreemathi. P S Saify Teacher	-
9	Shree. K V Williams Master	Till Date

== Religion ==
Pizhala has a Protestant church, One Catholic Church named as St. Francis Xaviers Church, Moorthinkal Shree Vaishnava Kshethram controlled by Kudumbi Community, Shree Balabhadra Temple controlled by Pulaya Community, and 8 other Family Temples.

=== Shree Balabhadra Temple ===
Shree Balabhadra Temple is First Temple in Pizhala. It has a history of more than a century. It is situated near to the Primary Health Center at Pizhala. Shree Bala Bhadra Temple is controlled by Pulya Community. Shree Balabhadra Temple is opening for "pooja" on a couple of days in every month.

=== Moorthinkal Shree Vaishnava Kshethram ===
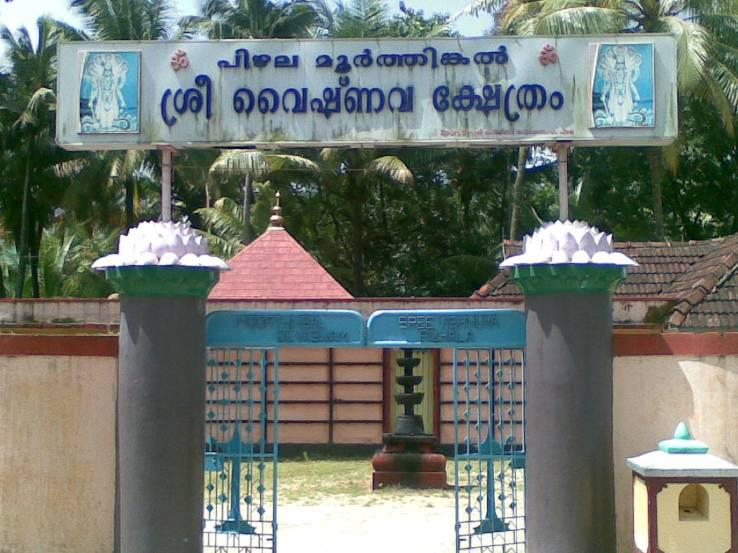
Pizhala Moorthinkal Shree Vaishnava Kshethram.

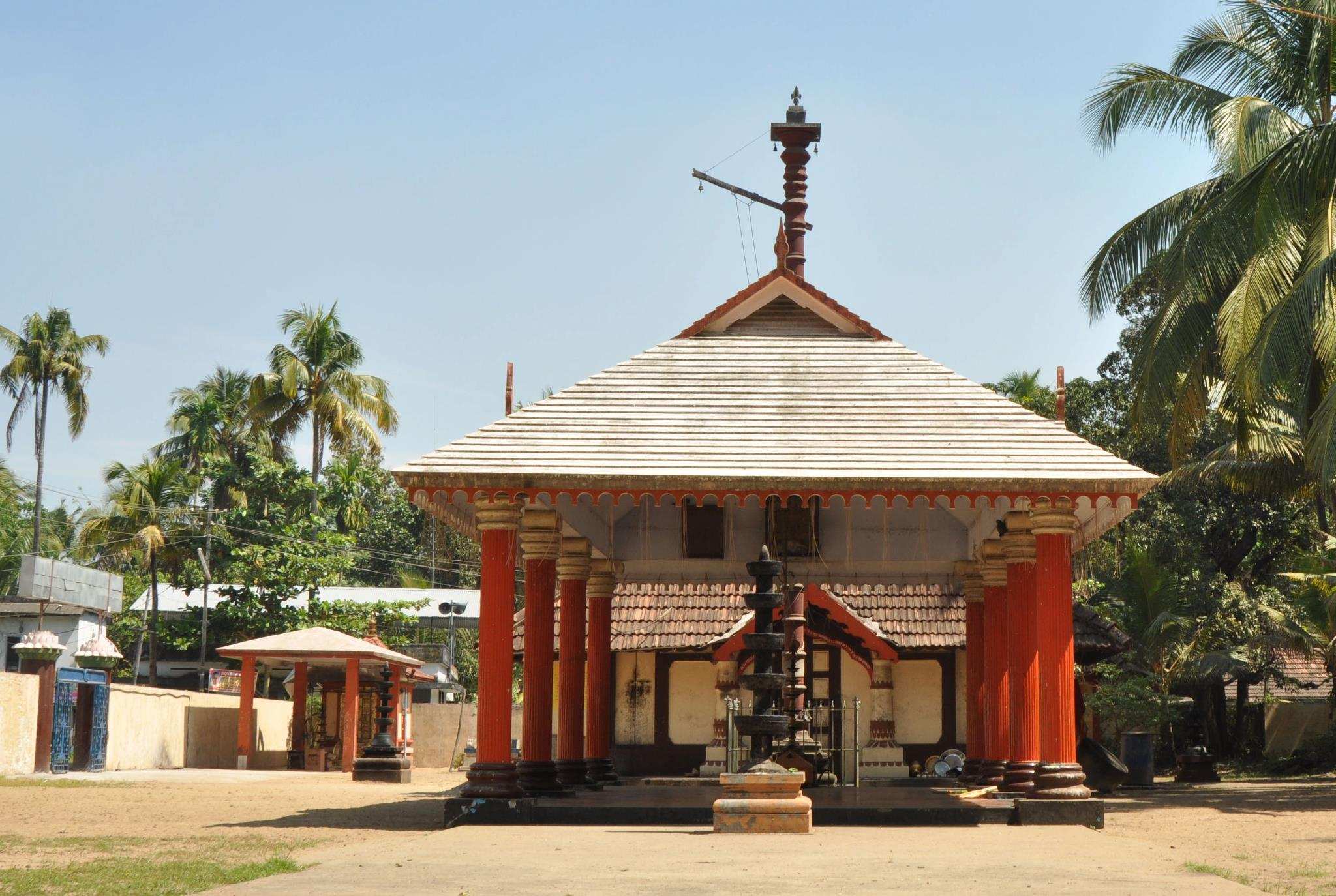
Pizhala Temple

Moorthinkal Shree Vaishanava Kshethram, is the major temple in Pizhala. The temple was constructed on 1924 under Kudumbi Community, a Konkani-speaking farming community residing in the island. The main deity worshipped here is Lord Vishnu . "Bhagavathi", "Brahma Rakshas", "Nagayakshi", "Ganapathi"and "Naga raj" are the sub worship of it. Temple will open for worship every morning and evening. The temple pond is located, and taking a dip is considered sacred

Annual Temple Festival : The annual Kodiyettam festival is a key attraction here and usually falls in Rohini star day in the month of Makham in Shaka Varsha Calendar. It is five day festival. The traditional temple art forms like Thayambaka is performed in the temple during festival season.

Ukuli / Manjal Kuli / Holi : This festival falls on the day after the full moon in early March, is being celebrated by the Kudumbi community in the State. Persecuted by the Portuguese in Goa, a section of the Kudumbi community fled Goa. Those who reached Kerala brought the festival of Holi with them and were welcomed by the ruler of Cochin. During the celebrations, the Kudumbis get themselves sprayed with coloured water (containing turmeric) and dance to traditional Kerala percussion. The ceremony is called 'Manjakkuli'

Niraputhari

=== St Francis Xaviers Church, Pizhala ===
==== Different Eras of Catholic Church Pizhala ====
Different Eras of Catholic Church Pizhala
Different Eras	Duration	No.of Parish Priests
Under Verapoly Parish	1892 -1918	8
Under Kothad Parish	1918 - 1939	7
Independent Parish	1939 - Till Date	24

=== Family Temples ===
No	Name of Temple	Worship	Controlling Family	Date of Construction
1	Vanadurga Temple	Vanadurga	Valiya Veetil Family	-
2	Maravan Temple	Maravan	Devaswam Parambil Family	-
3	Hanuman Temple	Hanuman	Panakkapparambil Family	-
4	Vanadurga Temple	Vanadurga	Theruviparambi Family -First Temple	
5	Shreerama Temple	Shreeraman	Theruviparambi Family - Second Temple	-
6	Thekkan Chovva Bagavathi Temple	Thekkan Chovva Bagavathi	Arisserry Parambil Family	-
7	Nagadevatha Temple	Nagadevatha	Theruviparambil Family - Third Temple	-
8	Shreerama Temple	Shreerama	Theruviparambil Family - Fourth Temple	-

== Agriculture ==
Pokkali rice cultivation is the major agricultural activity in the island. Pokkali cultivation is a traditional indigenous method of rice-fish rotational cultivation practiced in the coastal belts. The variety of paddy used for this type is locally known as Pokkali, which is salt-tolerating and usually tall. Cultivation is done in the fields adjoining the backwaters during June- September when the water is of low salinity followed by Filtered shrimp or Prawn or fish culture during November to April under traditional farming system.

After the harvest of the Pokkali paddy in the month of October, these fields are used for the culture of shrimps which is locally called as “Chemmeen Kettu” or “Chemmeen Vattu” or “Adappu” for duration of five months either by single ownership or joint ownership. The Soils of Pokkali fields are deep, dark or pale bluish black in colour, impervious nature and clayey in texture that forms cracks on drying and turn sticky on wetting. The salinity of Pokkali fields decrease rapidly up to the month of August and maintained till the end of December to January (Vanaja, 2013). This area is under confluence with the freshwater and saline water. The salinity varies from 0 to 31 ppt or more.

Recently, The Central Marine Fisheries Research Institute (CMFRI) is partnering with the Korampadam Service Co-operative Bank, Kothad, started to promote cage fish farming in the backwaters of Pizhala. This benefits a few hundred families in the island. A total of 60cage farming enterprises in Pizhala Island help increase fish production. Around 100 farmers including women are involved in the venture. The farming started even months ago by stocking the fish seeds in cages made of GI pipes with a width and length of four metre having a six metre depth. During the harvest, the farmers got the seabass with an average weight of 3.5 kg and pearl spot with 250g. The cage farming has been proved less expensive and economically viable. An amount of Rs. 100 only is required to produce a kilo gram for pearl spot by using cage farming method. But the farmer will get Rs. 500 to 600 for a kg of live pearl spot farmed in cages.

The other major crop in the island is coconut.

=== Proverbs ===
Because of The High Yield of Pokkali Cultivation, This Proverb arose in Kadamakkudy Region.(പിഴലയിൽ പാഴില്ല) Nothing wasted in Pizhala

== Economy and business ==
Fishing and rice cultivation are the major economic activities in the Pizhala Island. Local fish production includes species like Tilapia (Piloppi), Pearl Spot (Karimeen), prawns, shrimps, crabs etc are marketed fresh in the neighboring markets. There are many fisherwomen representing various defunct SHGs were formed as a potential group through number of sensitization programmes, imparted skills in value addition through trainings and technology demonstrations and motivated to take up some venture in a business mode. Fish value addition taken up by the fisherwomen of Pizhala was a successful endeavor which has led to generation of more than 30% additional family income.

Most of the inhabitants depend on nearby cities like Ernakulam, Aluva, N. Paravoor, Eloor, Kalamassery for the Jobs. Many of the locals are working in government services especially in water transportation department, Police department etc.

Tourism is another major economic activity on the island. Kadamakkudy is known for its shrimp farms and pokkali rice fields and is visited by tourists from Kochi, which is nearby and accessible by road.

== Transport ==
Pizhala - Moolampily bridge is the major connecting point which connect to Pizhala island to NH 966A in Moolampilly which further connects to Mulavukadu, Kothad, Cheranelloor, Eloor, Kalamassery, Ernakulam etc. Earlier, there were many boat services to S. Chittoor, Ernakulam, Varapuzha, Njarakkal etc, connecting Kadamakkudy islands to main lands. Also, there were ferry services connecting to Kothad (from Pizhala East) and Moolampilly (from Pizhala East), both were difunctional after the opening of the Pizhala - Moolampilly bridge. Currently, a ferry service connecting to Cheriyamthuruthu and Chennur (from Ashupathri Kadavu) and another ferry service connecting to Valiya Kadamakkudy (from Paliyathuruthu) are operational which may connect the locals to Varapuzha, Chathanadu and North Paravur.

There is a boat service by SWTD is operational connecting Kadamakkudy, Varappuzha and Ernakulam to ease the travel of students of the panchayat to access the nearby schools. The service is functional only during the school days. KSRTC buses starts from Pizhala - Moolampilly bridge to Ernakulam Jetty / Cherthala is running in houlry basis.

Two water metro jetties are proposed in Pizhala Island, one is at Paliyathuruthu and other is at Pizhala East which will be functional under Phase II developments.

== Infrastructure ==
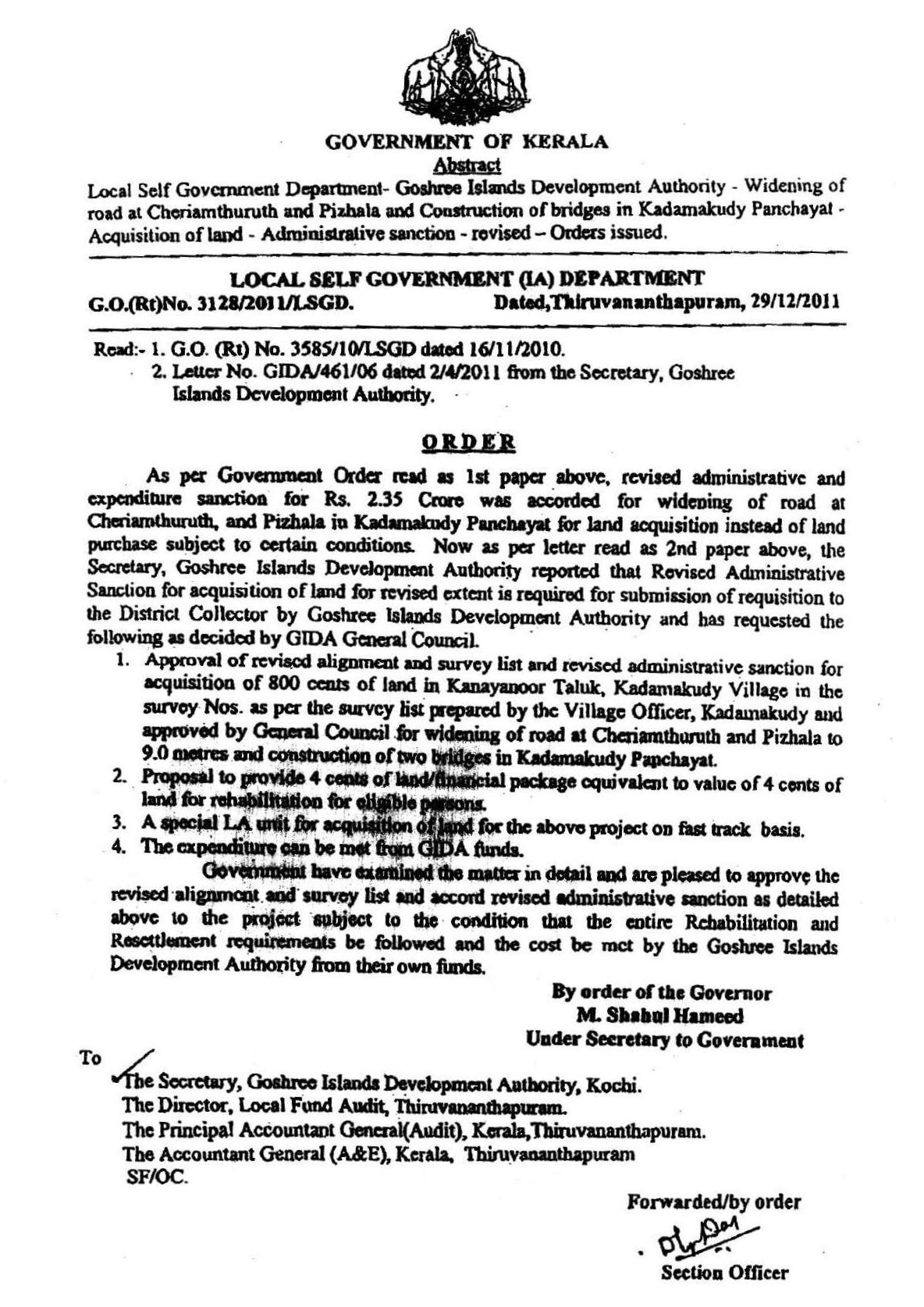
Kerala government order for Pizhala-Puthussery Road

Major Institution / Organisation located at Pizhala Island are:

- Primary Health Centre
- Kadmakudy Grama Panchayath Office
- Kadmakudy Village Office
- Govt. Veterinary Dispensary
- Panchayath Library
- Pizhala Post Office Pin 682 027
- Akshaya Centre
- Union Bank of India Branch
- Korampadam Service Co-operative Bank Ltd.No.178
