= Perumpilly =

Indian village

Coordinates: 9.887°N 76.387°E

Perumpilly, also Perumpally, is a village in Kanayannur taluk of Ernakulam district in Kerala state, south India. It is 22 km (14 mi) south-east of Ernakulam city. Perumpilly is famous for historic Christian churches and Hindu temples. The village lies 14 km (8.7 mi) from Piravom. The nearest town is Mulanthuruthy.

== Location ==
Perumpilly lies on the Ernakulam - Kottayam route through Mulanthuruthy, at 1 km from Mulanthuruthy and 3 km from kanjiramattom. The village is surrounded by paddy fields and the tributaries of Vembanad lake

== Pilgrim Centres ==
=== Perumpilly Simhasana Church ===
Perumpilly has a very famous Jacobite church, the Perumpilly Simhasana Church.

St. George's Simhasana Church at Perumpilly was founded by late Mor Yulius Elias Qoro, Patriarchal Delegate to Malankara in 1938. The church building was rebuilt by late Geevarghese Mor Gregorious, metropolitan of Kochi diocese, who had served at this church for several years as vicar. In 1982, H. H. Patriarch Zakka I consecrated the church. A small portion of the zoonoro (girdle) of the Holy Virgin, discovered by Patriarch Aphrem I at Homs, and given to late Mor Gregorius by Patriarch Ya`qub III has been preserved at this church since 1974. The mortal remains of Metropolitan Geevarghese Mor gregorious were interred in the sanctuary of the church on 23 February 1999. Patriarch Zakka I visited this church again in April 2000 to offer memorial prayers at the tomb of the late Metropolitan.

=== Sree Narasimha Swamy temple ===
One of the oldest and rarest temples where the deity is Lord Sree Narasimha Swamy. The temple is an ancient one and has got many stories related to the origin of Chottanikkara temple too. Currently the temple is maintained by Cochin Dewaswom board

=== Paadathukaav Bhagavathy Kshethram ===
Situates at a distance of 1 km (0.62 mi) from Perumpilly Nada. The deity is Bhadrakali. The temple has a Banyan tree with its foundation (ആല്ത്തറ) and a pond (അമ്പലക്കുളം) near it.

=== Vailappilli Sreekrishna Swamy Kshethram ===
Situates at a distance of 1 km (0.62 mi) from Perumpilly Nada.

== Other Info ==
=== Panar Bridge ===
A British made bridge connects Perumpilly to Amballur, which is obsolete, yet still stands as a memory of pre-independent period.

=== Hail Mary English Medium Residential Higher Secondary School ===
Hail Mary English Medium School Perumpally is a Higher Secondary school situated near Mulanthuruthy in the Ernakulam district of Kerala, India. The school was founded by the Perumpally St. George Simhasana church authorities under the special interest of Perumpally Thirumeni.

The school has produced 100% success for the SSLC since the time of starting. The school comes under the Thripunithura educational subdistrict. Apart from academics, the school also contributes in the arts and sports meets as well. There is a separate KG section for the grooming of little children.

=== Dharma Bharathi Ashram ===
Dharma Bharathi Mission (DBM), a socio-spiritual organization for human solidarity, holistic development and integral peace, has its Ashram situated in the village of Perumpilly.

=== Salvation Army church ===
An institution of Salvation Army International is situated in Perumpilly.
