= St. George Jacobite Syrian Church, Cherai =

St. George Jacobite Syrian Church Cherai
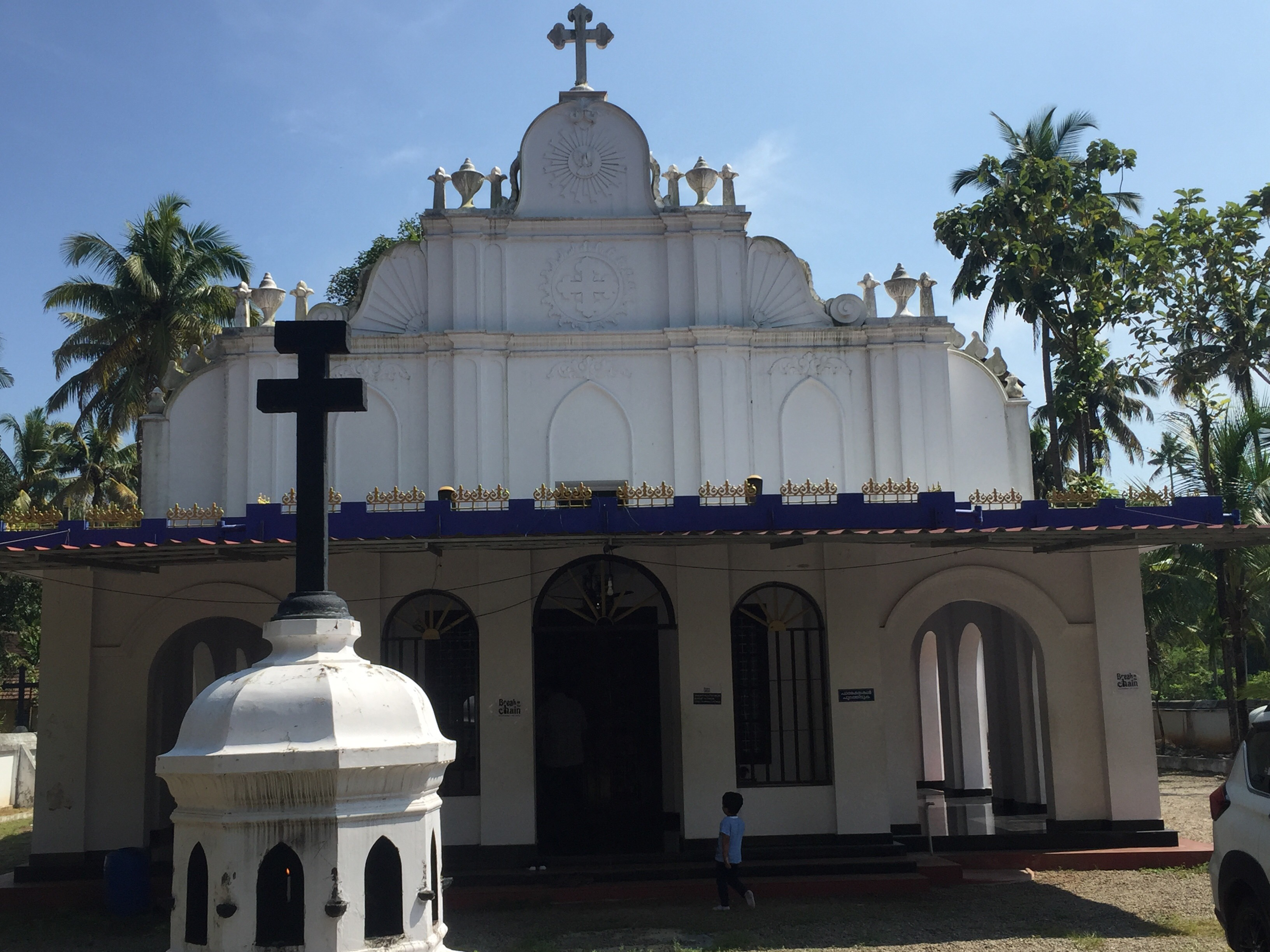
- Location: Cherai, India
- Denomination: Jacobite Syrian Christian Church
- Tradition: Syriac, Malayalam

History
- Founded: 1871
- Dedication: Saint George

Administration
- Diocese: Cochin diocese

Clergy
- Vicar: Fr. Johns Abraham Perumpilly

St. George Jacobite Syrian Church located in Cherai, Ernakulam district of Kerala, is a historical parish of the Jacobite Syrian Christian Church, known locally as Cherai CheriyaPally.

== History ==
St. George Jacobite Syrian Cathedral, Cherai is believed to have been established on 12 October 1871, by a few members who separated from St. Mary's Jacobite Church in Cherai. The first Holy Eucharist (Holy Qurbona) in this church was celebrated by Fr. M C Yakub Kathanar, the son of Avira Chacko, who had bought the land with granted permission of Kingdom of Cochin. On October 12, 1901 a new church was consecrated by Geevarghese Gregorios of Parumala.

== Altars ==
The major altar is dedicated to Saint George, patron saint of the church; Saint Mary Mother of God, and Saint John the Baptist.

== Gallery ==
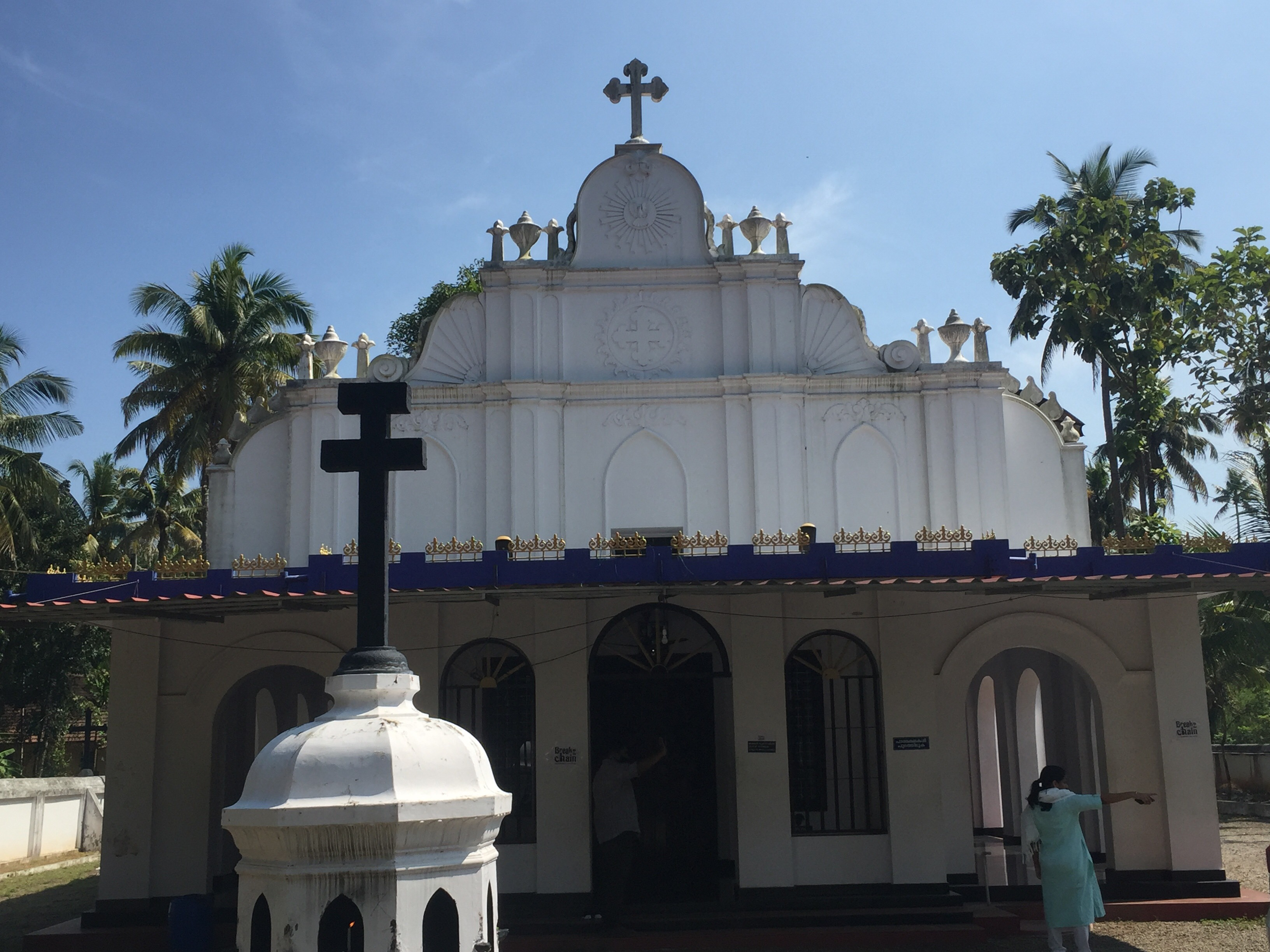
Front View of St. George Church, Cherai

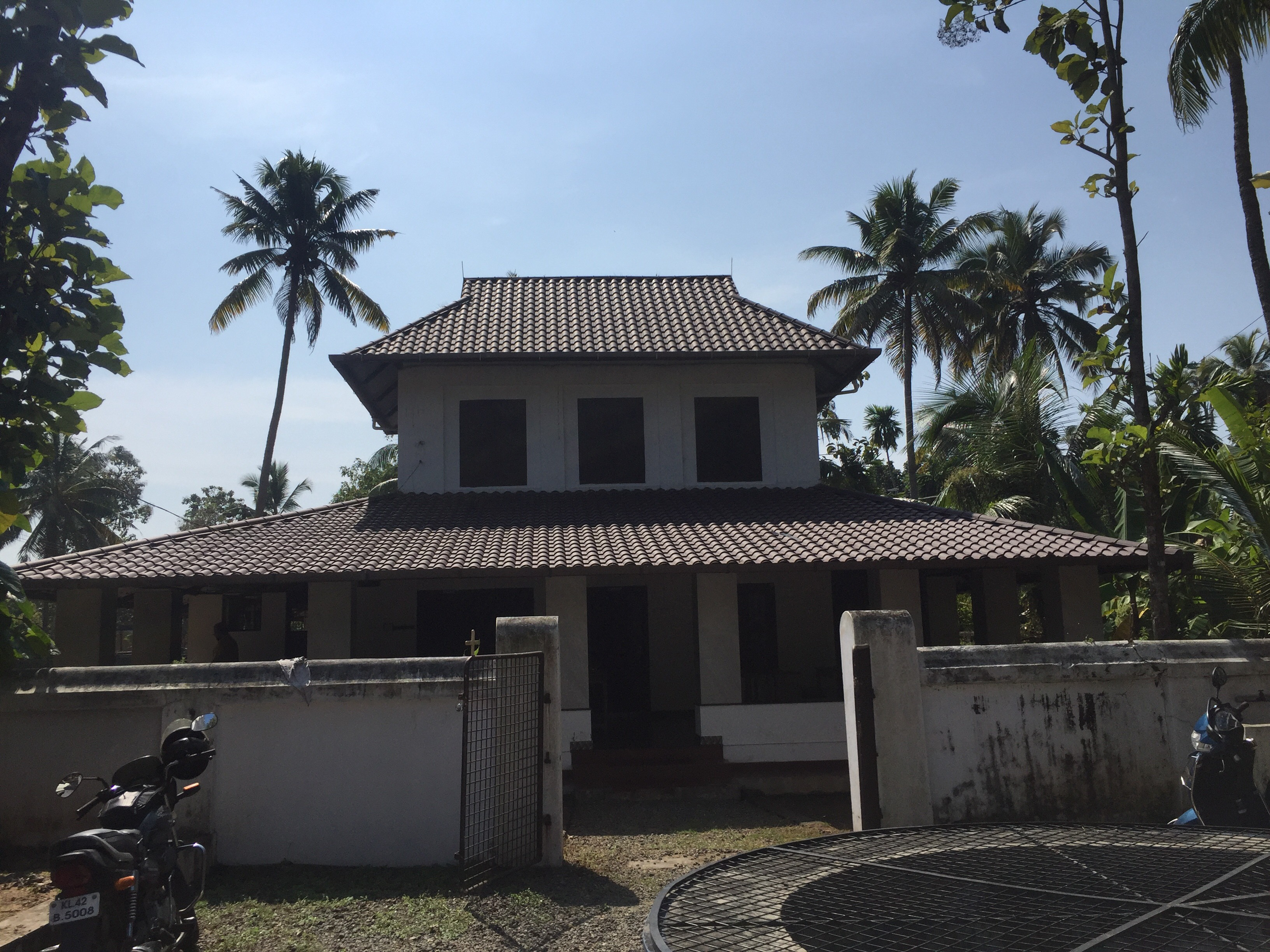
Pasonage of St. George Church Cherai

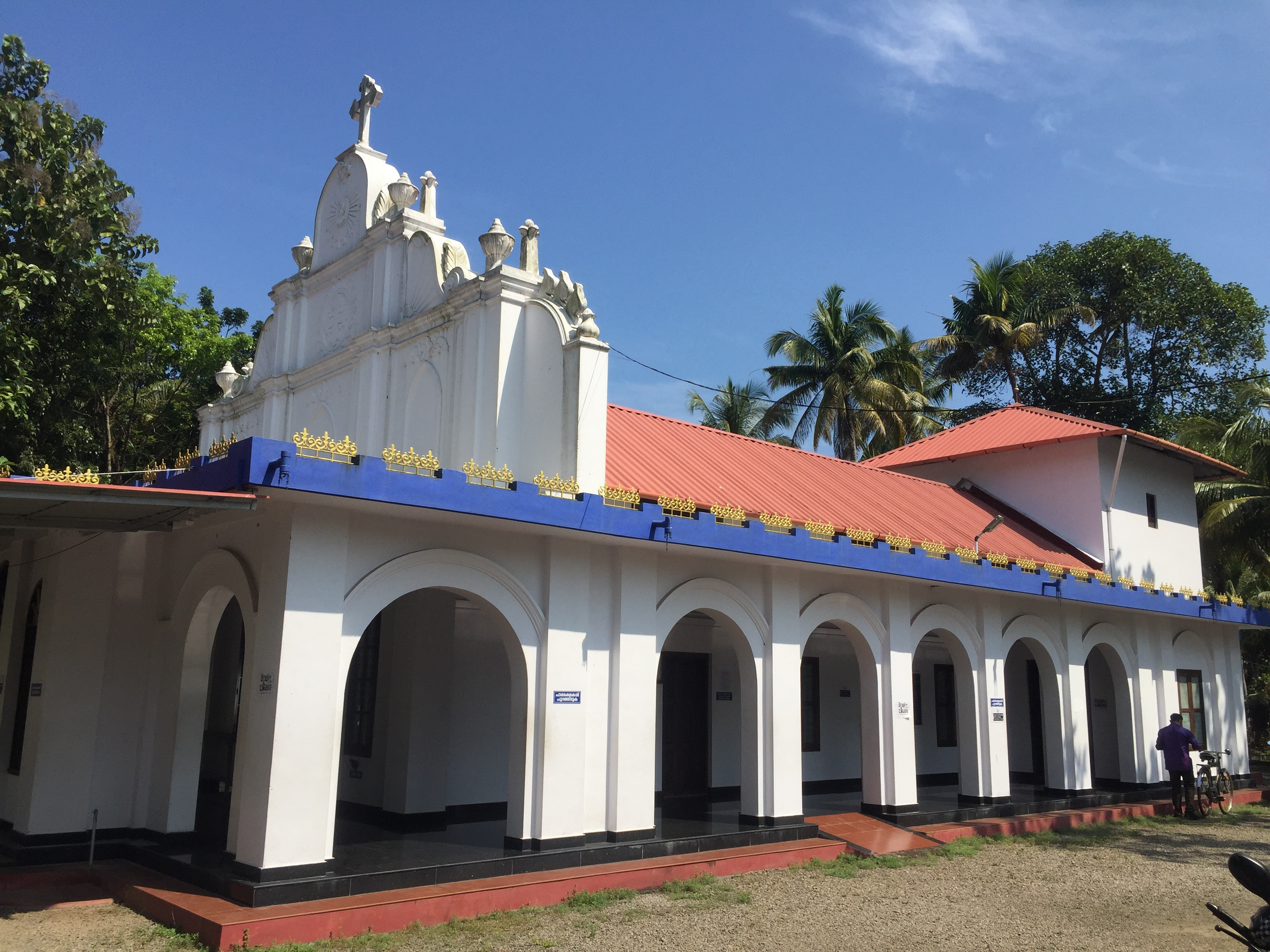
Side view of St. George Church, Cherai

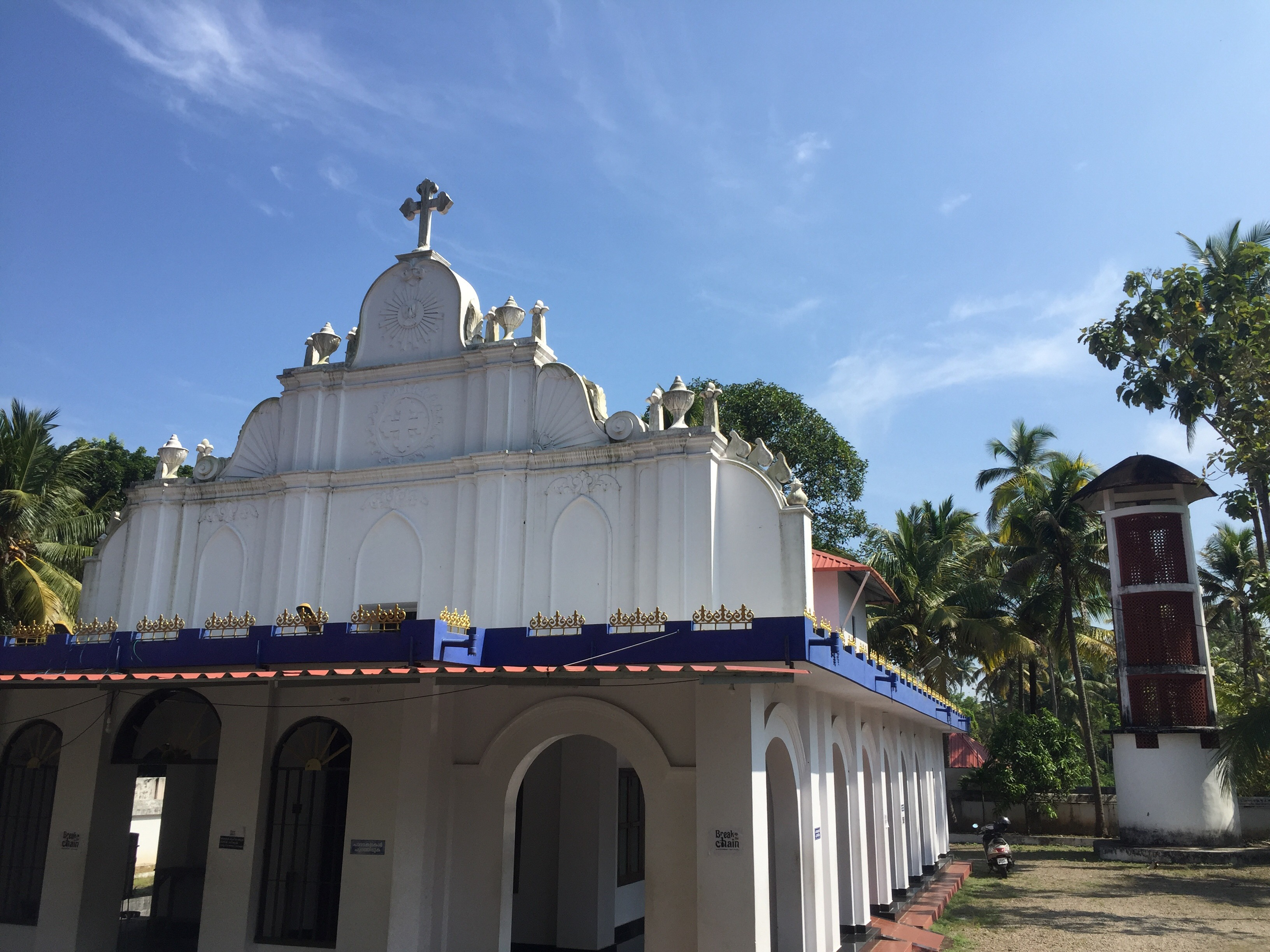
Side view of St. George Church, Cherai

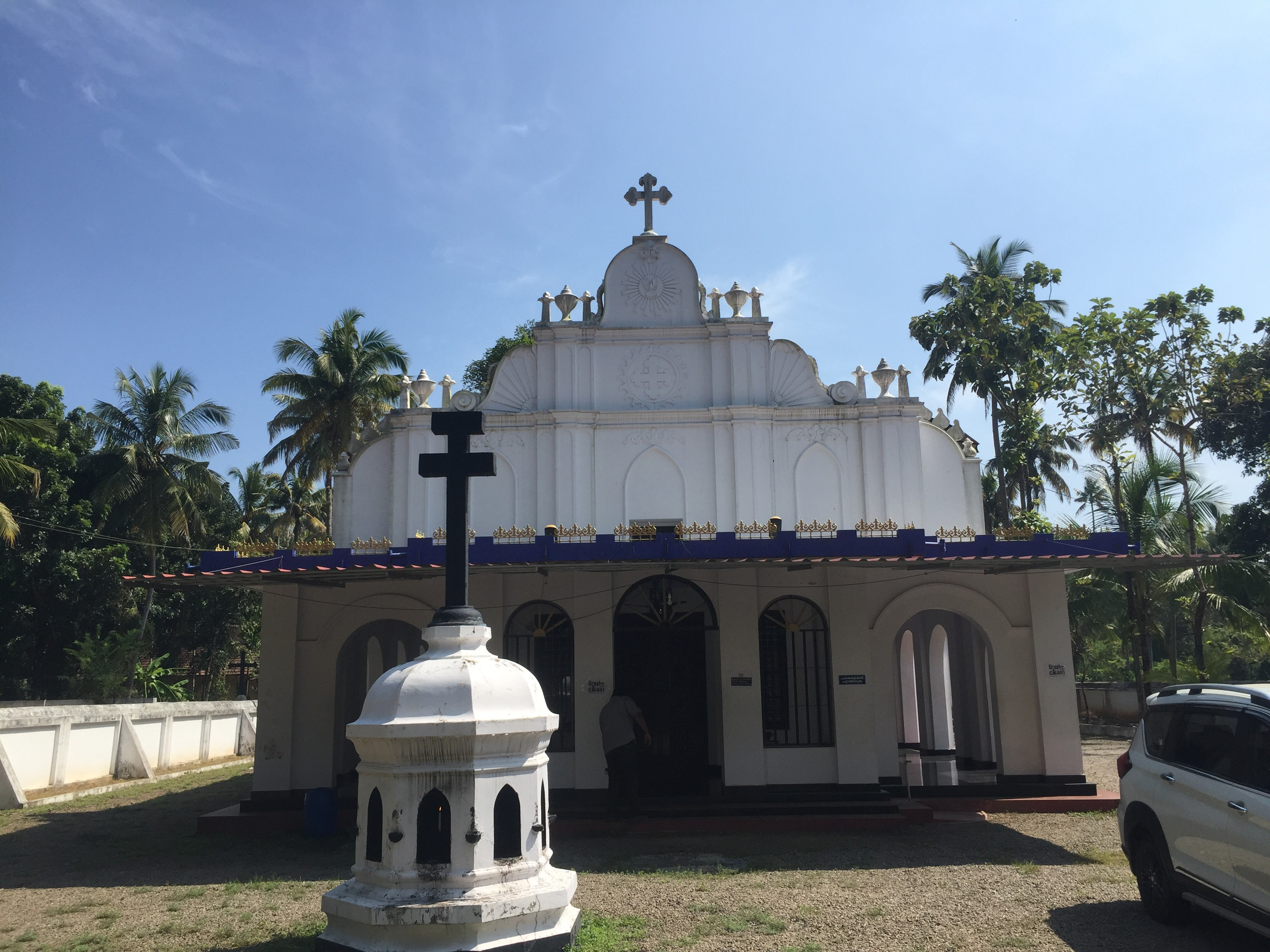
Stone cross and St. George Church, Cherai
