= Kaippattur =

- village
- Location in Kerala, India Kaippattur (India)
- Coordinates: 9.8410016°N 76.4476321°E
- Country: India
- State: Kerala
- District: Ernakulam
- Taluk: Kanayannur
- Elevation: 48 m (157 ft)

Population (2011)
  - Total: 6,246
- Time zone: UTC+5:30 (IST)
- 2011 census code: 628004

Kaippattur is a village in the Ernakulam district of Kerala, India. It is located in the Kanayannur taluk.

== Demographics ==
According to the 2011 census of India, Kaippattur has 1579 households. The literacy rate of the village is 87.99%.

Demographics (2011 Census)
	Total	Male	Female
Population	6246	3051	3195
Children aged below 6 years	475	253	222
Scheduled caste	952	459	493
Scheduled tribe	2	1	1
Literates	5496	2729	2767
Workers (all)	2611	1781	830
Main workers (total)	1991	1438	553
Main workers: Cultivators	225	177	48
Main workers: Agricultural labourers	328	210	118
Main workers: Household industry workers	23	12	11
Main workers: Other	1415	1039	376
Marginal workers (total)	620	343	277
Marginal workers: Cultivators	40	17	23
Marginal workers: Agricultural labourers	196	116	80
Marginal workers: Household industry workers	18	8	10
Marginal workers: Others	366	202	164
Non-workers	3635	1270	2365
