= Aadyam Jolie Pinne Kalyanam =

2022 Indian TV mini-series

- Created by: Vimal Kumar; Jisma Jiji
- Written by: Vimal Kumar; Jisma Jiji
- Starring: Vimal Kumar; Jisma Jiji
- Music by: Azim Roshan
- Country of origin: India
- Original language: Malayalam
- No. of seasons: 1
- No. of episodes: 4

Production
- Producers: J&V Pictures
- Production location: Amballoor
- Cinematography: Athul Krishna; Vishnu Nandan; Asif Pav
- Editor: Midhun Krishna
- Running time: 120 minutes
- Production companies: J&V Pictures

Original release
- Network: YouTube
- Release: 30 July – 2 December 2022

Aadyam Jolie Pinne Kalyanam (ആദ്യം ജോലി പിന്നെ കല്യാണം, Malayāḷam) is a 2022 Indian Malayalam-language mini-series created by and starring Vimal Kumar and Jisma Jiji, along with Sharan S, Samarth Ambujakshan, Arya Jagadeesh and Smruthi Anish in supporting roles.

The series lasted for 4 episodes. The first episode titled was released on 30 July 2022 and the last episode on 2 December 2022.

== Cast ==
=== Main ===
- Vimal Kumar as Satheeshan
- Jisma Jiji as Revathi

=== Recurring ===
- Sharan S as Raghu sir
- Smruthi Anish as Amminiyamma
- Samarth Ambujakshan as Vinod Amballoor
- Arya Jagadeesh as Sumi
- Midhun Krishna as Vishnu
- Sivaprasad Ajayan as Achal
- Adithya Shiju as Young Satheeshan
- Jess Sweejan as Young Revathy

=== Guest ===
- Shine Tom Chacko as Antoney

== Episodes ==
No.	Original release date
1	30 July 2022
Revathi is a government employee fed up with marriage proposals from her mother and colleagues and finally makes an excuse that she will get married only after actress Nayanthara gets married. Satheshan is an unemployed, easy-going youth and the go-to-go person for everyone. When Revathy complains of having to leave her mother alone after her marriage, her colleague mockingly suggests her to marry Satheshan, who is her neighbour. A bewildered Revathy propose Satheshan on hearing Nayanthara's marriage news.
2	19 August 2022
Both Revathy and Satheshan are shocked at the proposal but soon figure out their love for each other. Although, Amminiyamma, Revathy's mother becomes upset with the news as Satheshan is unemployed. Revathy challenges her that Satheshan will soon become a government employee like her by clearing the PSC test and that they will be married after that.
3	1 October 2022
Satheshan starts preparing for PSC test while continuing his affair with Revathy. Revathy's one-side lover and colleague, Raghu sir tries to create problems in their lives by interfering in Revathy's office work. After a series of events in her office, Revathy decides that a man always does not require a job to get married if his partner has one. Satheeshan also agrees with her in the heat of the moment.
4	2 December 2022
Satheeshan soon regrets their decision to get married so quickly. But he soon changes his decision when he learns about Raghu sir's actions towards Revathy. Amminiyamma is still in disapproval but Revathy's headstrongness and clarity about her life and decisions changes her kind. Raghu sir turns up with a goon, Antoney and starts to throw something at the couple which was later revealed to be a popper. Antoney had enlightened him about the non-necessity of violence and the need makes sacrifices for other's happiness. Finally, Revathy and Satheshan gets married with everyone's blessings.

== Soundtrack ==
Original Songs
No.	Title	Lyrics	Music	Singer(s)	Length
1.	"Koode Neeyum"	Hrishikesh Mundani	Azim Roshan	Rohan D M	3:12
2.	"Ente Officilulla Revathi"		Azim Roshan	Azim Roshan	1:38
3.	"Athino Thinthino (Nadanpattu)"	Koottam Arayankaavu	Koottam Arayankaavu	Koottam Arayankaavu
