= St. Francis Xavier's Church, Pizhala =

St. Francis Xavier’s Church, Pizhala; സെന്റ്‌ ഫ്രാന്സിസ് സേവ്യർ ദേവാലയം പിഴല (Malayalam); Ecclesia S. Franciscus Xaverius, Pizhala (Latin)
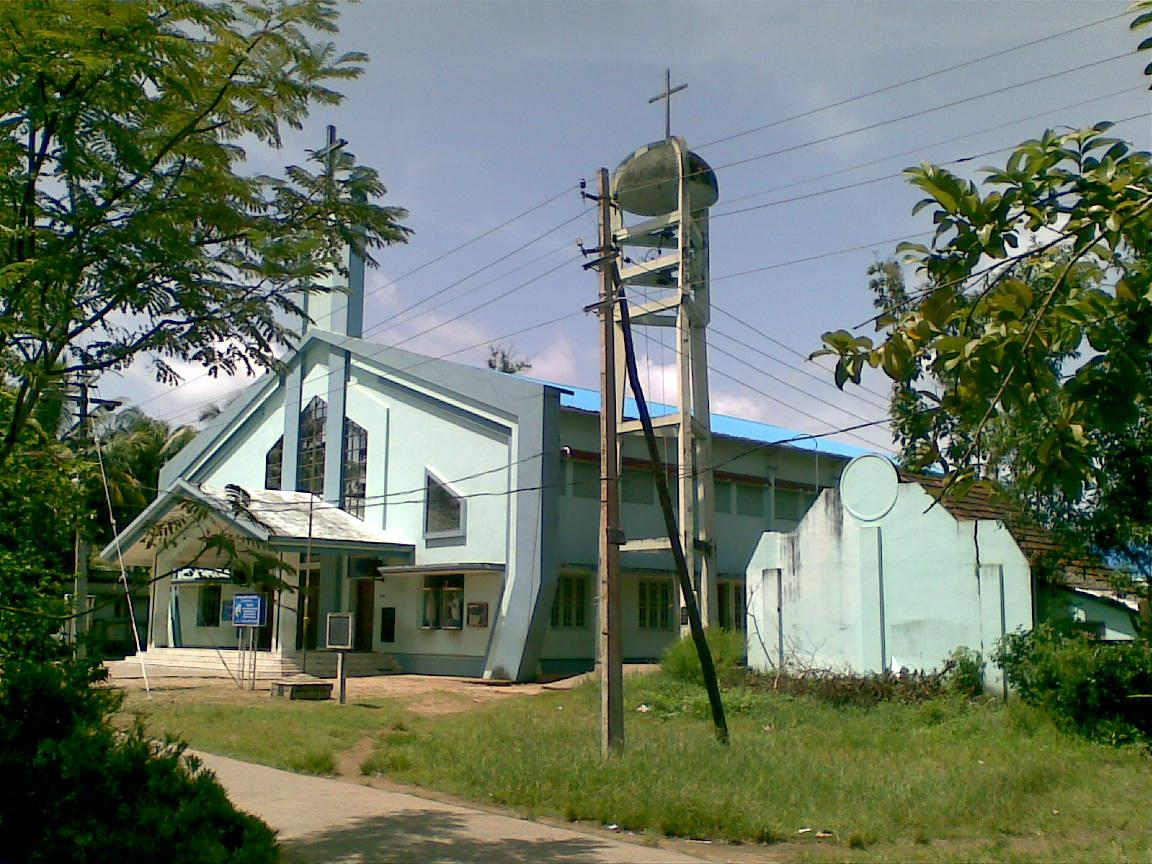
- St. Francis Xavier's Church, Pizhala has a history of more than one century. Pizhalaites constructed three churches for their parish in the duration of 125 years.

- Location in Kerala, India

Religion
- Affiliation: Catholic
- Rite: Roman Latin
- Ecclesiastical or organisational status: Parish
- Year consecrated: 1892

Location
- Location: Pizhala
- Coordinates: 10.0479°N 76.2625°E

Architecture
- Architects: Engr. P. C Xavier; Fr. Cletus Parambiloth; Cornelius ambalathinkal
- Groundbreaking: 12 February 2005
- Completed: 12 December 2005

Specifications
- Length: 25 m (82 ft)
- Width: 23.5 m (77 ft)

St. Francis Xavier's Church is a parish of the Roman Catholic Church in Pizhala, Kerala, in the Archdiocese of Verapoly.

== History ==
=== Second Church Construction ===
Fr. Joseph Moonjappilly was the vicar during this period

=== Third Church Construction ===
Fr. John Kanakkassery, was the vicar during this period

== Different Periods of St. Francis Xavier's Church, Pizhala ==
St. Francis Xavier's Church has been growing through three Different periods since 1892

Different Periods of St. Francis Xavier's Church, Pizhala
Different Eras	Duration	No.of Parish Priests
Under Verapoly Parish	1892–1918	8
Under Kothad Parish	1918–1939	7
Independent Parish	1939 – Till Date	24

=== Period Under Verapoly Parish ===
Parish Priests who lead Pizhala Under Verapoly Parish
No	Name	Duration	Major Parish
1	Rev. Fr. Alphonse OCD	1892–1894	Verapoly
2	Rev. Fr. Bonaventure OCD	1894–1898	Verapoly
3	Rev. Fr. Alphonse OCD	1998–1900	Verapoly
4	Rev. Fr. Elias OCD	1900–1901	Verapoly
5	Rev. Fr. POLYCARP OCD	1901–1903	Verapoly
6	Rev. Fr. Angelus OCD	1903–1907	Verapoly
7	Rev. Fr. Vincent OCD	1907–1910	Verapoly
8	Rev. Fr. Ligarius OCD	1910–1922	Verapoly

=== Period Under Kothad Parish ===
No	Name	Duration	Major Parish
1	Rev. Fr. Joseph Norrona Nekkunnasserry	1915–1927	Kothad
2	Rev. Fr. Alexander Nekkunnasserry	1927–1932	Kothad
3	Rev. Fr. Augustine Elliparambil	1933–1938	Kothad
4	Rev. Fr. Jacob Kallarakkal	1938–1953	Kothad
	Since 1953, on Priest has been staying in Pizhala Priest bungalow		
5	Rev. Fr. Alexander Kannikkal	1935–1937	Kothad
6	Rev. Fr. Joseph Pandyethum parambil	1937–1939	Kothad
7	Rev. Fr. Seraphin Benedict	1939	Kothad

=== Period of Independence Since 1939 May 28 ===
No	Name	Duration	Development Activities
1	Rev. Fr. Joseph Moonjappilly	1939–1944	Founder of Development in Pizhala
2	Rev. Fr. Bernard Kanappilly	1944–1945	–
3	Rev. Fr. Abraham Payyappilly	1945–1946	–
4	Rev. Fr. Joseph Moonjappilly	1946–1953	Returned to Pizhala
5	Rev. Fr. Stanly Paduwa	1953–1956	–
6	Rev. Fr. Paul Attippetti	1956–1961	–
7	Rev. Fr. Joseph Chakkalaparambil	1961–1963	–
8	Rev. Fr. Paul Koikkaran parambil	1963–1973	–
9	Rev. Fr. Antony Pinhiero	1973–1975	–
10	Rev. Fr. Varghese Pavanathara	1975–1981	–
11	Rev. Fr. Rockey Kalathiparambil	1981–1985	–
12	Rev. Fr. Thomas kolarikkal	1985–1987	–
13	Rev. Fr. Joseph Kuttikkal	1987–1988	–
14	Rev. Fr. Michel Thalekketti	1988–1989	–
15	Rev. Fr. Patrik Elavunkal	1989–1992	–
16	Rev. Fr. Aloysius Thaiparambil	1992–1994	–
17	Rev. Fr. Antony Vellayil	1994–1997	–
18	Rev. Fr. Rockey kollamparambil	1997–2000	–
19	Rev. Fr. Peter Ambalathinkal	2000–2002	–
20	Rev. Fr. John Kanakkasserry	2002–2005	–
21	Rev. Fr. Augustine Issac Kurishinkal	2005–2007	–
22	Rev. Fr. Shyju Xavier cherumuttath	2007–2009	–
23	Rev. Fr. Denny Palakkaparambil	2009–2014	–
24	Rev. Fr. Sojan Thoppil	2014–2017	–
25	Rev. Fr. Robinson Panakkal	2017–2019	celebrated quasquicentennial (125 Years) of The Church
25	Rev. Fr. Prince Xavier Kannothparambil	2019 – present	

== Missionaries from Pizhala parish ==
=== Priests from Pizhala Parish ===
No	Name of The Priest	Date of birth	Date of Ordination
1	Very. Rev. Msgr. Devassy Erathara	17 May 1953	3 December 1963
2	Rev. Fr. Francis Cheriya Kadavil OCD	–	–
3	Rev. Fr. Felix Chakkalakkal	27 February 1953	23 December 1979
4	Rev. Fr. Sebastian Oliparambil	28 August 1965	11 January 1991
5	Rev. Fr. Varghese Edathil	2 May 1966	23 April 1992
6	Rev. Fr. Justin Edathil	13 February 1974	21 April 2003
7	Rev. Fr. Binu Pandaraparambil	14 March 1976	31 December 2003
8	Rev. Fr. Ebin Vayaliparambil	–	–
9	Rev. Fr. Albin Odipattil	–	–
10	Rev. Fr. Yesudas Pokkath	–	–
11	Rev. Fr. Raphel Kalluvettil	–	–
12	Rev. Fr. Jerry Oliparambil		
14	Rev. Fr. Jobin George Avarev	–	–

=== Nuns from Pizhala Parish ===
No	Name of Nuns	Date of birth	Date of Final Profession	Congregation
1	Rev. Sr. Osberga	18 January 1961	4 May 1991	CTC
2	Rev. Sr.Basil CSST	15 May 1952	31 May 1980	CSST
3	Rev. Sr. Lucy	20 October 1951	19 November 1983	FDCC
4	Rev. Sr.Nisha Rani	18 January 1961	4 May 1991	CSST
5	Rev. Sr.Alice	20 March 1960	20 January 1992	FMM
6	Rev. Sr. Jessica	14 February 1967	26 September 1993	SDV
7	Rev. Sr. Mary	5 September	–	CSM
8	Rev. Sr.Maria Teresa	10 October 1967	–	CTC
9	Rev. Sr.Celine Albert SCCG	6 February 1973	18 November 2000	SCCG
10	Rev. Sr. Harita CSST	12 February 1968	28 May 2002	CSM
11	Rev. Sr.Lilly Margie	25 January 1971	12 September 1997	CSST
12	Rev. Sr.Bridget	10 December 1970	25 November 1999	SCCG
13	Rev. Sr. Annie Blossy	26 September 1972	13 September 1999	SMCD
14	Rev. Sr. Sharon	30 October 1972	5 January 2001	CTC
15	Rev. Sr.Maria Ligy	15 June 1978	21 November 2001	SCCG
16	Rev. Sr.Mary	12 February 1968	28 May 2002	Ocarm
17	Rev. Sr. Jency	8 May 1972	4 January 2003	FMM
18	Rev. Sr. Bindu	1 November 1973	7 May 2003	SMCD
19	Rev. Sr.Udaya	27 March 1970	20 June 2006	CTC
20	Rev. Sr. Veronica	28 April 1976	8 September 2000	SDZ
21	Rev. Sr.Jilsy Williams	23 August 1980	22 November 2008	–
22	Rev. Sr. Bridget Viji	17 June 1979	9 October 2010	ACI
23	Rev. Sr. Tresa Silgy	3 April 1984	19 May 2011	SMCD
24	Rev. Sr. Ashita	8 December 1976	14 May 2013	CTC
25	Rev. Sr.Alphonsa Simla	25 June 1988	Not Yet	SMCD

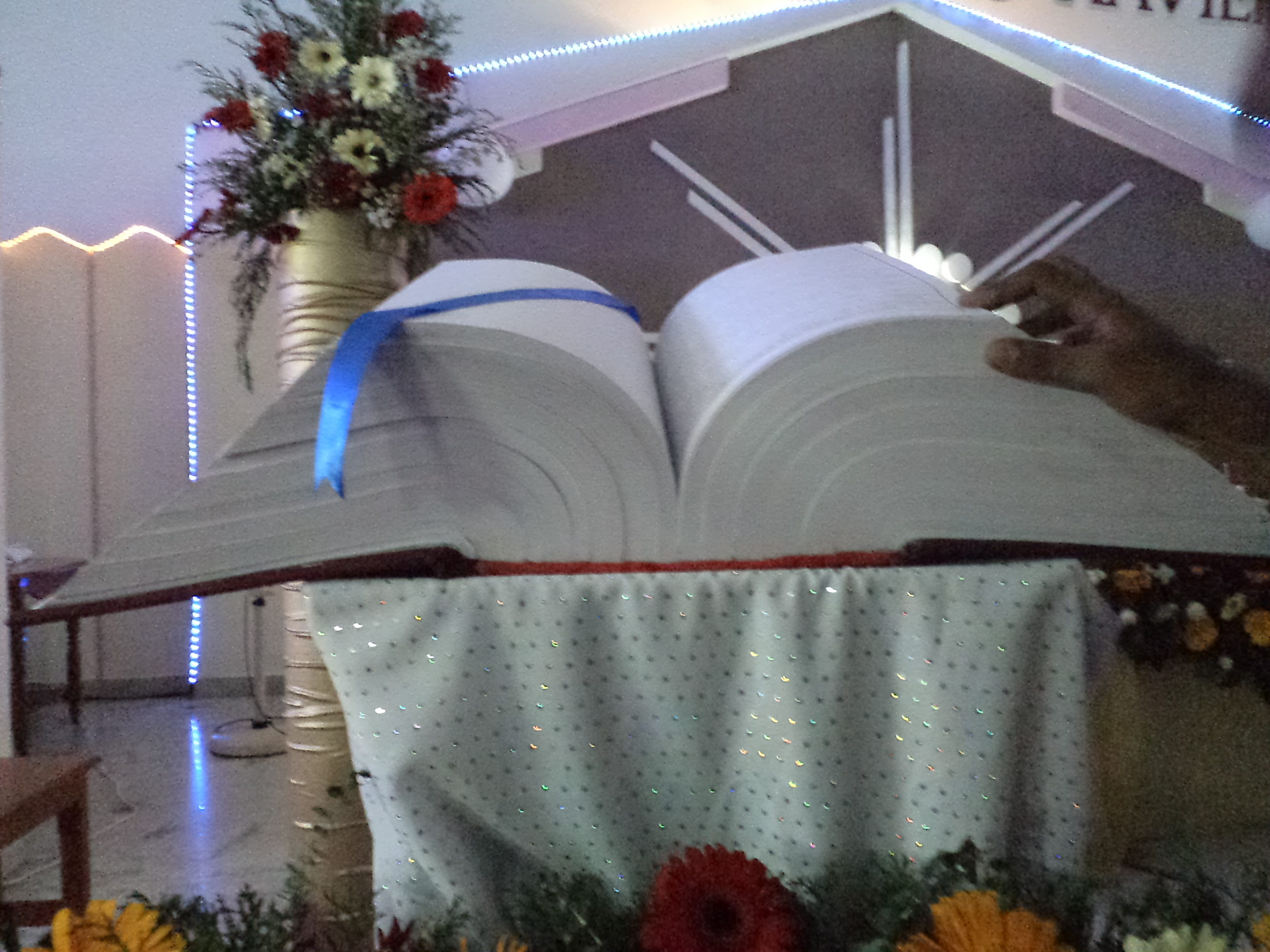
Pizhala Parish People wrote Bible.
