= Thrikkakara North =

- village
- Location in Kerala, India Thrikkakara North (India)
- Coordinates: 10.035°N 76.329°E
- Country: India
- State: Kerala
- District: Ernakulam
- Talukas: Kanayannur

Government
  - Type: Panchayati raj (India)
  - Body: Gram panchayat

Languages
  - Official: Malayalam, English
- Time zone: UTC+5:30 (IST)
- PIN: 6XXXXX
- Vehicle registration: KL-

Thrikkakara North (Village) is a village in Ernakulam district in the state of Kerala, India. It is part of Thrikkakara Municipality.

== Areas in Thrikkakkara-Kakkanad Urban Area ==
- Kalamassery
- Thrikkakkara North
- Thrikkakkara South
- Kakkanad
- Vazhakkala
