= K. A. Isaac =

Indian writer and librarian

- Born: Kadapuram Abraham Isaac; 10 July 1925; Kanjiramattom, Ernakulam, Kerala, India
- Died: 12 September 2005 (aged 80); Thiruvananthapuram, Kerala, India
- Occupations: Librarian, academic
- Writing career
- Genres: Library Science, Documentation, Information Science
- Notable works: Library Legislation in India: A Critical and Comparative Study of State Library Acts

Kadapuram Abraham Isaac (10 July 1925 – 12 September 2005) was an Indian writer and librarian. He was a Professor and Head of the Department of Library and Information Science at the University of Kerala, Thiruvananthapuram. Isaac was known for initiating and moulding the professional Library and Information Science (LIS) education in Kerala and has authored several books on Library and Information Science. He had served as a member of the Senate of the Kerala University and as Dean of its Arts Faculty.

== Early life ==
Isaac was born on 10 July 1925, to a family named Kadapuram at Kanjiramattom in Ernakulam district, Kerala as the youngest son of K. V. Itten (Abraham) and Mary Itten. He studied Intermediate and B.Sc. with physics as the main subject in the Union Christian College, Aluva. He took a diploma in Library Science in 1952 and the Master's degree with First rank in 1953 from the University of Delhi, where he was a student of S. R. Ranganathan.

Isaac was married to Chechamma Kurien. Their elder son, Abraham Isaac, is an advocate in Thiruvananthapuram and the second son, K. Kurien Isaac, is a Professor of Mechanical Engineering at the Indian Institute of Technology Bombay.

== Publications ==
Books

- Libraries & Librarianship: A Basic Introduction
- Libraries in Distance Education (co-authored with Dr. G. Devarajan and S.K. Bajpai) (1989)
- Literature search (Concepts in Communication, Informatics & Librarianship, 19) (1990)
- Library Computerisation in India : Isaac Festschrift: Papers Presented in Honour of Prof. K.A. Isaac (co-authored with Dr. G. Devarajan and A. V. Rahelamma) (1990)
- Glimpses of Library and Information Science (2001)
- Library Legislation in India: A Critical and Comparative Study of State Library Acts (2004)

Dr. G. Devarajan has edited Library and Information Studies in the Digital Age as Professor K.A. Isaac Commemoration Volume (2006).

Journal articles

- University Grants Commission in Relation to Library and Information Science Education in India, Library Science with a Slant to Documentation, 15(3) : 109-112, 1978.
- Future Prospects for Education for Librarianship in India, Library Science with a Slant to Documentation and Information Studies, 33 (2) : 57-64, 1996.
