= Kothad =

Kothad കോതാട്
- Island
- Location in Kerala, India Kothad (India)
- Coordinates: 10.05303°N 76.27301°E
- Country: India
- State: Kerala
- District: Ernakulam
- Talukas: Kanayannur

Government
  - Body: Kadamakkudy Panchayat

Languages
  - Official: Malayalam, English
- Time zone: UTC+5:30 (IST)
- PIN: 682027
- Telephone code: 0484
- Lok Sabha constituency: Ernakulam
- Nearest city: Ernakulam/Kochi

Kothad is an island near Kochi surrounded by river Periyar. It is a part of Kadamakkudy grama panchyath, Kanayannur Taluk, Ernakulam District in the Indian state of Kerala.

== Transport ==
Kothad is one among the group of islands, that form a part of Kadamakkudy Panchayat. Kothad comprises Kandanad and Korampadom has a population of over 1,500. Kothad is connected by the Kothad-Chitoor bridge and The International Container Transshipment Terminal road which assure the islanders an easy transportation.

Private Buses frequently operates from kothad to Kochi city and Aluva. A boat service operating between Ernakulam-Varapuzha also serves Kothad island.

In June 2025, a CRZ clearance was received for Chennur-Kothad bridge project.

== Education ==
Higher Secondary School of Jesus Kothad has empowered students of all castes and creeds, and has found strength in the diversity of secularism.

== Economy ==
70% of the Kothad island consists of paddy fields; the economy of Kothad was principally consists of inland fishing by traditional methods and cultivation of rice. Gradually fishing and farming was replaced. Agriculture is becoming unprofitable for people. Migration to gulf countries of Kuwait, UAE, Oman, Bahrain and Saudi Arabia is one of the most attractive alternative opportunities among youth.

== Religion ==
Religions in Kothad are a mixture of different faiths, most significantly Christianity and Hinduism. Kothad has a reputation of being, communally one of the most tolerant islands in Ernakulam. The Sacred Heart Church, Kothad is a famous centre of pilgrimage. People from all parts of Kothad island and outside, irrespective of caste or creed visit the church to seek blessings. This is an ancient Christian Church built in the 18th century. The church was re-established in 2004.
