= Vazhakkala =

Vazhakala
- Neighbourhood
- Location in Kerala, India
- Coordinates: 10.01516°N 76.329422°E
- Country: India
- State: Kerala
- District: Ernakulam

Population (2001)
  - Total: 42,272

Languages
  - Official: Malayalam, English
- Time zone: UTC+5:30 (IST)
- Postal code: 682030

Vazhakala is a neighbourhood region in the city of Kochi in Kerala, India. It is situated around 5 km (3 mi) from the city center and is part of Thrikkakkara Municipality. It can be classified as a typical residential area adjacent to schools, colleges and professional institutions.it has a history about 150 years mainly associated with age old churches and temples.

== Location ==
Located adjacent to the District collectorate, special economic zone, info park, and NPOL, Vazhakkala occupies a central location in the city of Kochi. Lulu Mall, the premier shopping mall in Kerala is just a five-minute drive from here.

As of 2001 India census, had a population of 42,272. Males constitute 49% of the population and females 51%. Vazhakkala has an average literacy rate of 84%, higher than the national average of 59.5%: male literacy is 86%, and female literacy is 82%. In Vazhakkala, 11% of the population is under 6 years of age. Moreover, Vazhakkala was recorded to be having the highest sex ratio (1072) in the district of Ernakulam.

== Transportation ==
Cochin International Airport is about 30 km from this place. There are two railway stations nearby at a distance of about 8 and 10 kilometers. They are Ernakulam Town (also called North) and Ernakulam Junction (and this one is South). Main transportation modes are two- and four-wheelers and public transport system.

== Facilities ==
Vazhakkala is situated in Thrikkakara which has the Thrikkakara temple. The proposed extension of metro rail from Kaloor to Info Park passes through here. Cochin University of Science and Technology and Model Engineering is about a 10 minute drive from Vazhakkala.

== Areas in Thrikkakkara-Kakkanad Urban Area ==
- Kalamassery
- Thrikkakkara North
- Thrikkakkara South
- Kakkanad
