= Kulayettikara =

- village
- Location in Kerala, India Kulayettikara (India)
- Coordinates: 9°50′0″N 76°25′0″E
- Country: India
- State: Kerala
- District: Ernakulam

Population (2011)
  - Total: 7,914

Languages
  - Official: Malayalam, English
- Time zone: UTC+5:30 (IST)

Kulayettikara is a village in Ernakulam district in the Indian state of Kerala. The village is administratively under Amballoor Gram Panchayat and falls within the Mulamthuruthy community development block. The nearest major town is Thrippunithura, about 13km away.

Postal Address: Kulayettikara, Ernakulam, Kerala, India PIN: 682115

== Demographics ==
- Total Population: 7,914 (2011 data)
  - Female: 4,036 (51%)
  - Male: 3,878 (49%)
- Population Density: 1,179 persons per km²
- Number of households: 1,937
- Scheduled Castes: 1,138 (14.4%)
- Scheduled Tribes: 6 (0.08%)
- Literacy Rate: 87.5% overall (female literacy rate notably high)

== Social & infrastructure features ==
Governing Authority: Amballoor Gram Panchayat

Village Office Contact:

- Near Amballur Grama Panchayath
- Phone: +91 8547613810
- Email: ekm019vlg.rev@kerala.gov.in
