= Kadamakkudy Islands =

Island group in Kerala, India

Kadamakudy Islands
- Kadamakkudy Islands
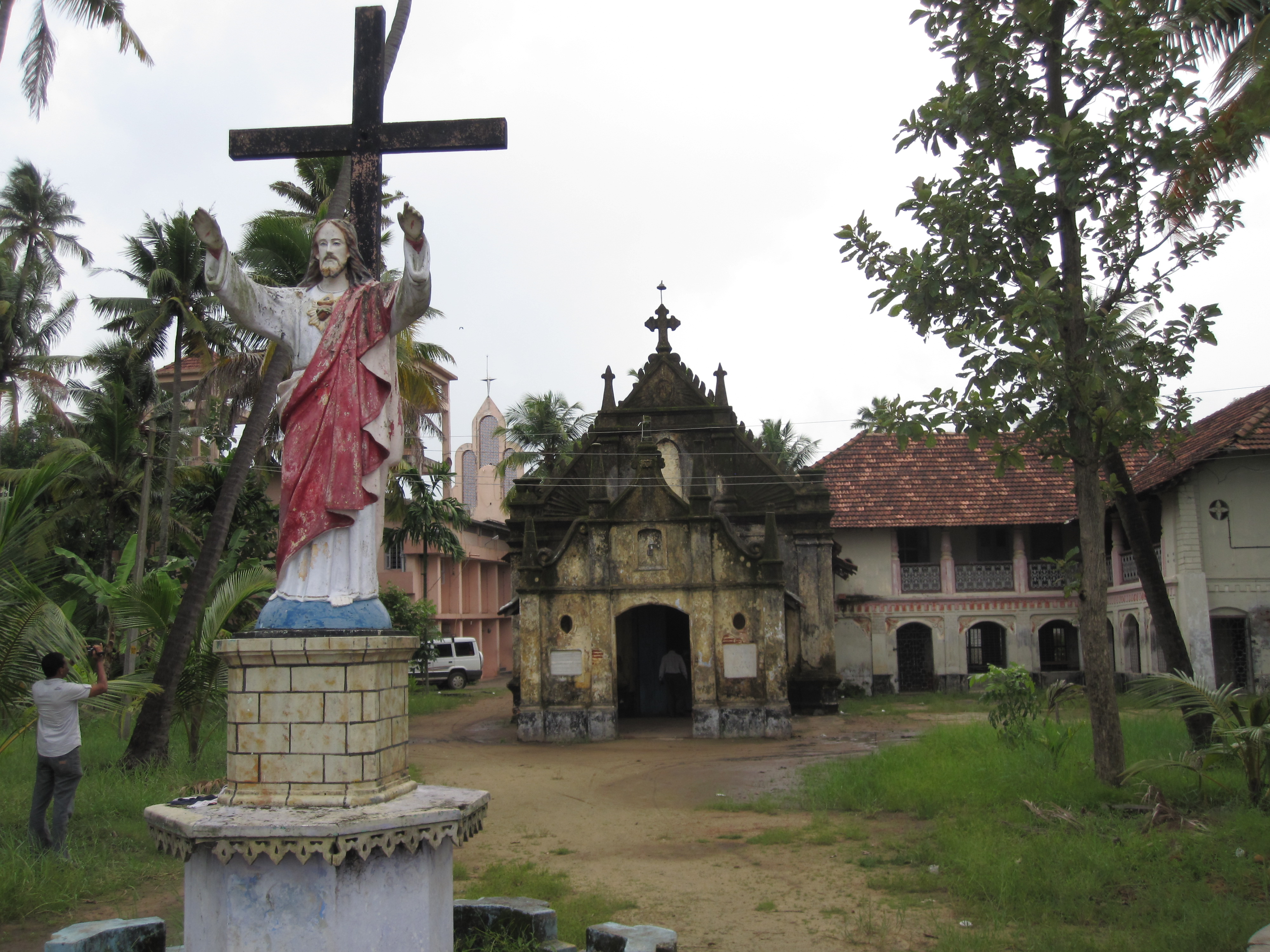
- Kadamakkudy Islands
- Interactive map of Kadamakudy Islands
- Coordinates: 10.06519°N 76.2451386°E
- Country: India
- State: Kerala
- District: Ernakulam

Population (2001)
  - Total: 15,823

Languages
  - Official: Malayalam, English
- Time zone: UTC+5:30 (IST)
- Postal code: 682027

Kadamakudy Islands is an island suburb of the city of Kochi in the Indian state of Kerala. Known as the Kuttanad of Kochi, It is situated around 8 km (5 mi) north of the city centre.

== Geography ==
Kadamakkudy Islands is a cluster of fourteen islands: Valiya Kadamakudy (the main island), Murikkal, Palyam Thuruth, Pizhala, Cheriya Kadamakudy, Pulikkapuram, Moolampilly, Puthussery, Chariyam Thuruth, Chennur, Kothad, Korambadam, Kandanad and Karikkad Thuruthu.

The Grama panchayth is administered under the kerala Panchayth Raj system and the present administrators are The President Smt Shalini Babu and The Panchayth Secretary Sri Dylan Tom

== Demographics ==
As of 2001 India census, Kadamakkudy islands had a population of 15,823. Males constitute 49% of the population and females 51%. Kadamakkudy has an average literacy rate of 84%, higher than the national average of 59.5%: male literacy is 86%, and female literacy is 82%. In Kadamakkudy islands, 11% of the population is under 6 years of age.

== Religion ==
Kadamakkudy islands have 9 Catholic Churches.

Venerable Mar Varghese Payyappilly Palakkappilly had served as the parish priest of Valiya Kadamakkudy Syrian Catholic Church (1909–11).
