= Manakunnam =

- village
- Location in Kerala, India Manakunnam (India)
- Coordinates: 9°47′45″N 76°27′0″E
- Country: India
- State: Kerala
- District: Ernakulam

Population (2011)
  - Total: 39,538

Languages
  - Official: Malayalam, English
- Time zone: UTC+5:30 (IST)

Manakunnam is a village in Ernakulam district in the Indian state of Kerala.

== Demographics ==
As of 2011 India census, Manakunnam had a population of 39538 with 19375 males and 20,163 females.
