= Thrikkakkara South =

- village
- Country: India
- State: Kerala
- District: Ernakulam

Languages
  - Official: Malayalam, English
- Time zone: UTC+5:30 (IST)
- Postal code: 682021
- Telephone code: 0484
- Vehicle registration: KL-
- Coastline: 0 kilometres (0 mi)
- Climate: Tropical monsoon (Köppen)
- Avg. summer temperature: 35 °C (95 °F)
- Avg. winter temperature: 20 °C (68 °F)

Thrikkakkara South is a village in Ernakulam district of Kerala.

There is a police station.

== Areas in Kalamassery-Thrikkakkara-Kakkanad urban area ==
- Kalamassery
- Thrikkakkara North
- Thrikkakkara South
- Kakkanad
- Vazhakkala
