= Kanayannur =

- Taluk/Village
- Interactive map of Kanayannur
- Coordinates: 9°58′0″N 76°16′0″E
- Country: India
- State: Kerala
- District: Ernakulam

Area
  - Total: 303.06 km^{2} (117.01 sq mi)
  - Rank: 5

Population (2011)
  - Total: 9,308
  - Rank: 1
  - Density: 30.71/km^{2} (79.55/sq mi)

Languages
  - Official: Malayalam, English
- Time zone: UTC+5:30 (IST)
- PIN: 682XXX
- Vehicle registration: KL-7 Ernakulam; KL-39 Thripunithura
- Nearest city: Kochi
- Lok Sabha constituency: Ernakulam
- Niyama Sabha constituency: Ernakulam; Thrippunithura; Piravom; Thrikkakara; Kalamassery

Kanayannur is a taluk and a village in the district of Ernakulam, in the Indian state of Kerala. Taluk is an administrative denomination in India.

== Etymology ==
The name Kanayannur likely originated from 'Kaniyannur'. Historian V V K Valath, in his work Keralathinte Sthalacharithrangal suggested that name maybe connected to Kaniyans, whom he identified as Jains who once inhabited the area. There is also a field which is known as Kaniyanparambu in the village, which Valath suggested might have given rise to the name Kanayannur.

== History ==
Kanayannur Taluk was formed in 1762, and is one of the oldest taluks in the former Kingdom of Cochin. Following the reorganisation of the former Travancore-Cochin state, a new Kanayannur Taluk was constituted on 1st October 1956, along with Alwaye and Cochin Taluks. When Ernakulam district was formed on 1st April 1958, Kanayannur became one of its constituent taluks.

== Demographics ==
As of 2011 India Census, Kanayannur had a population of 9308 with 4622 males and 4686 females.

The Kanayannr taluk office is situated at Park Avenue, Marine Drive, Kochi. There is a village in Kanayannur taluk whose name is also Kanayannur. The Kanayannur village office is situated at a village called Eruvely.

The general sex ratio as per latest census i.e 2011 India Census is 1,034 females per 1,000 males. The taluk has a high literacy rate at 97.12% (Male - 98.2%, Female - 96.1%). The taluk is highly urbanized and encompasses a significant portion of the Kochi metropolitan region.

== Revenue villages in Kanayannur Taluk ==
1. Ernakulam
2. Elamkulam
3. Poonithura
4. Edappally North
5. Edappally South
6. Kalamassery
7. Thrikkakara North
8. Thrikkakara South
9. Kakkanad
10. Vazhakkala
11. Cheranelloor
12. Kadamakkudy
13. Mulavukad
14. Nadama-Thekkumbhagam
15. Thiruvamkulam
16. Maradu
17. Kumbalam
18. Kureekkad
19. Chottanikkara
20. Kanayannur
21. Udayamperoor
22. Manakunnam
23. Mulanthuruthy
24. Keechery
25. Kulayettikara
26. Amballoor
27. Edakkattuvayal
