= Edakkattuvayal =

- village
- Location in Kerala, India Edakkattuvayal (India)
- Coordinates: 9.8677977°N 76.4360623°E
- Country: India
- State: Kerala
- District: Ernakulam
- Taluk: Kanayannur
- Elevation: 46 m (151 ft)

Population (2011)
  - Total: 11,912
- Time zone: UTC+5:30 (IST)
- 2011 census code: 628003

Edakkattuvayal is a village in the Ernakulam district of Kerala, India. It is located in the Kanayannur taluk. Toc H Institute of Science and Technology, AP Varkey Mission Hospital and Chinmaya Mission are major institutions in the area.

== Demographics ==
According to the 2011 census of India, Edakkattuvayal has 2966 households. The literacy rate of the village is 89.3%.

Demographics (2011 Census)
| | Total | Male | Female |
|---|---|---|---|
| Population | 11912 | 5817 | 6095 |
| Children aged below 6 years | 917 | 462 | 455 |
| Scheduled caste | 962 | 493 | 469 |
| Scheduled tribe | 16 | 7 | 9 |
| Literates | 10637 | 5256 | 5381 |
| Workers (all) | 4586 | 3346 | 1240 |
| Main workers (total) | 3897 | 2991 | 906 |
| Main workers: Cultivators | 565 | 505 | 60 |
| Main workers: Agricultural labourers | 471 | 337 | 134 |
| Main workers: Household industry workers | 73 | 51 | 22 |
| Main workers: Other | 2788 | 2098 | 690 |
| Marginal workers (total) | 689 | 355 | 334 |
| Marginal workers: Cultivators | 33 | 17 | 16 |
| Marginal workers: Agricultural labourers | 94 | 52 | 42 |
| Marginal workers: Household industry workers | 24 | 8 | 16 |
| Marginal workers: Others | 538 | 278 | 260 |
| Non-workers | 7326 | 2471 | 4855 |

== See also ==
- St. Mary's Orthodox Syrian Church
