= Kanjiramattom =

- Location in Kerala, India Kanjiramattom (India)
- Coordinates: 9.8643°N 76.4042°E
- Country: India
- State: Kerala
- District: Ernakulam
- Talukas: Kanayannur

Languages
  - Official: Malayalam, English
- Time zone: UTC+5:30 (IST)
- PIN: 682 315
- Telephone code: 0484
- Vehicle registration: KL-39

Kanjiramattom in Ernakulam District, Kerala, India is a suburban area of the City of Kochi lying approximately 25 km southeast to the City of Kochi. The place is known for the Arayankavu Devi Temple And Sheikh Fariddudin Mosque and its proximity to the famous Arayankavu Temple.

The Mosque is famous for Kodikuthu which is celebrated on 13–14 January every year. It is one of the most important religious festivals of Kerala and is very colourful. Arayankavu Temple hosts the famous festival consisting of Garudan Thookkam. Pooram is the most famous celebration.

== Kanjiramattom Kodikuthu ==
The annual festival Koottekkavu And Arayankavy Thookkam and Kanjiramattom Kodikuthu is held at the Kanjiramattom Mosque, built as a memorial to Sheikh Fariduddin. The Chandanakkudam (Sandalwood Pot) ritual is the main event of the Kanjiramattom Kodikuthu and is conducted at night, when the pilgrims carry Pots covered with Sandalwood paste and proceed in a procession to the Mosque. The six caparisoned and ornamented elephants and folk performances add color to the event. Traditional Muslim art forms like Duffmuttu and Kolkali are also staged during the festival. These are song and dance performances.

The Kanjiramattom Kodikuthu draws a large number of tourists from all over. People come dressed in their best clothes to offer their prayers in the Kanjiramattom Mosque during this festival. It is not a purely Muslim festival and people of all religious backgrounds participate in it without discrimination. There is total communal harmony. Hindus also throng to the Mosque on Kodikuthu. At the "Meleppalli" - Upper Mosque- there is a stone edifice for "vavar swami".

== St. Ignatius Jacobite Syrian Church ==
This church is situated near the Kanjiramattom town. Church has a school named St. Ignatius Vocational and Higher Secondary School.

St. Ignatius Jacobite Syrian Church holds remembrance of third patriarch of Antioch at 1 and 2 January.

== Education ==
St. Ignatius Vocational & Higher secondary school Kanjiramattom

== Kanjiramattom Town ==
Kanjiramattom town is also known as "Millunkal " because there was a huge mill back in the day. In earlier days there was no mill in the Puthankave, Tripunithura area, so the people used to came here for grinding purposes, hence the name "Millunkal". There is also a river near kanjiramattom.

There is boating in the river and on the various islands nearby for entertainment.Kanjiramattom railway station is located 1 km south to kanjiramattom town.

== Nearby attractions ==
Chottanikkara Temple - located approximately 9 km north east. Hill Palace, Tripunithura - 13 km
