= Cheraman Parambu =

Archaeological site in Kerala

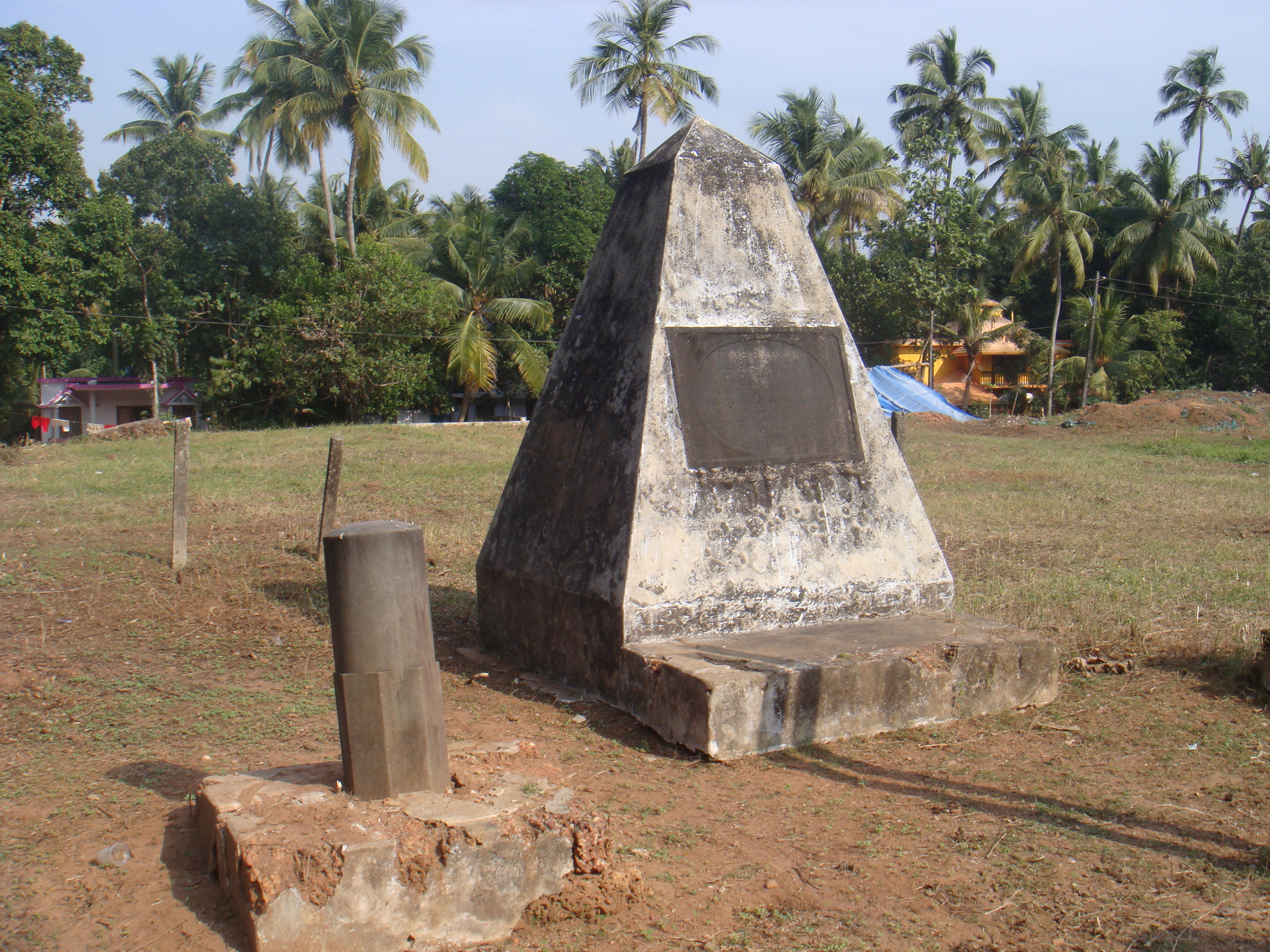
A modern marker at Cheraman Parambu.

Cheraman Parambu (literally, the Compound of the Chera Rulers) is an archaeological site in Kodungallur, Thrissur district, Kerala. The site has been identified as the location of the medieval Chera royal palace in the capital city of Mahodayapuram-Kodungallur. The palace has now completely disappeared, though it is estimated to have survived until the early 13th century CE.

Cheraman Parambu site in Kodangallur

The mound extends over an area of about three acres at Methala, around 3 km from Kodungallur. The road from Kodungallur to Kottappuram notably cuts across this archaeological site. The size of the Cheraman Parambu mound has diminished considerably in recent years due to the encroachments.

== Historical references ==
The Laghubhaskariyavakhya by Shankaranarayana, a mathematical commentary dated to the 9th century CE, suggests that the palace (adhikritha prasada) of the Chera ruler of Kerala was located in an area called "Gothramalleshvara" in Mahodayapuram. The 14th century literary work "Kokasandesha" refers to this compound as the abode (kulapuri) of the Chera kings who had once ruled the whole of Kerala. Local chronicles such as Keralolpathi also mention the Chera kings' palace (Allur Perumkovilakam) at Kodungallur. It is also assumed to be the same as the Great Palace (Perum Kovilakam) mentioned in the Vira Raghava Copper Plate (c. 1225 CE), which was used at the time by the local rulers of Kodungallur as their royal residence.

== Excavations ==
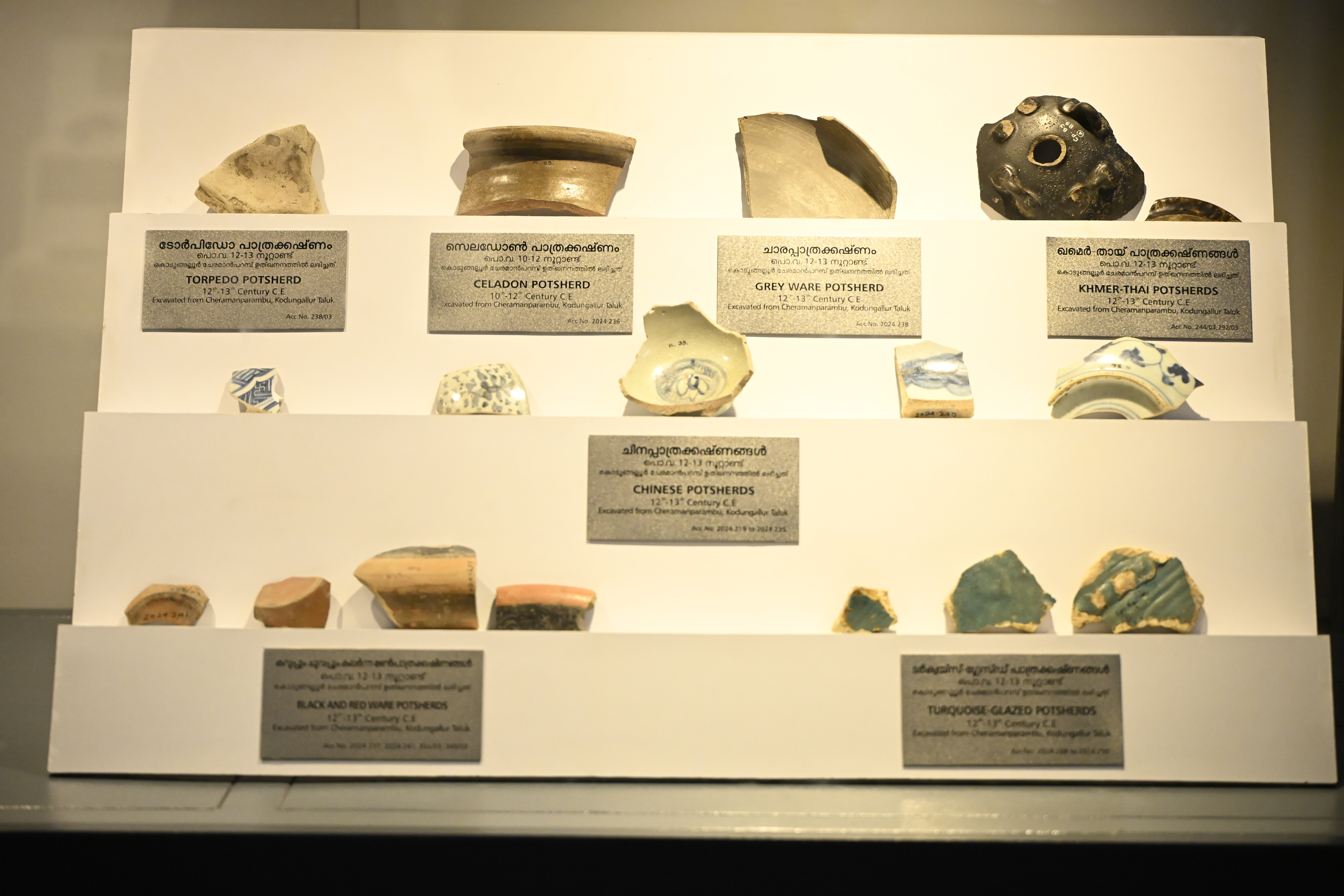
Potsherds, Cheraman Parambu (Shakthan Thampuran Museum, Thrissur).

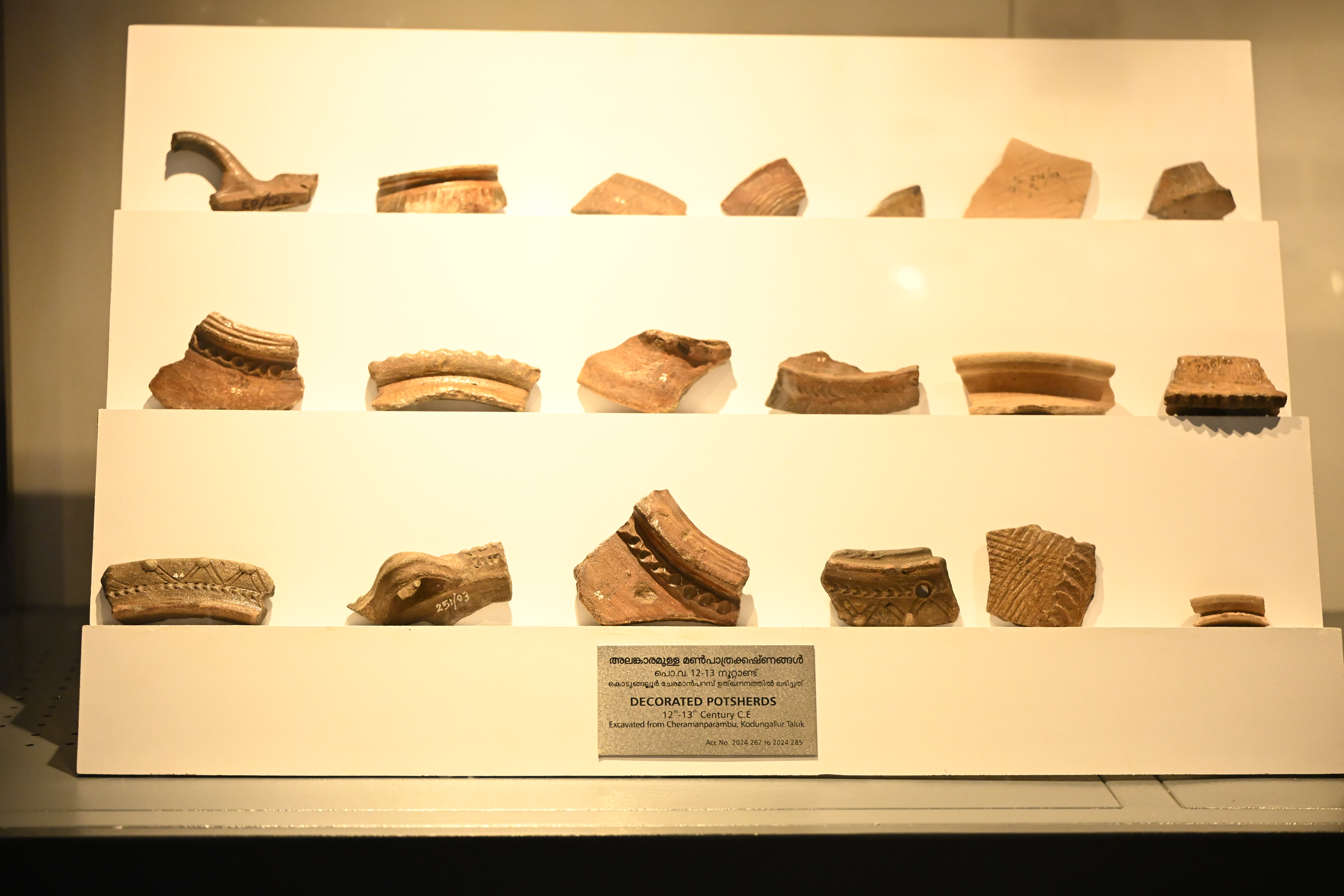
Potsherds, Cheraman Parambu

The lands surrounding the Cheraman Parambu mound were registered under private ownership, and coconuts were planted across the area. Since the mound stood at a higher elevation, the land had to be levelled in preparation for cultivation. During this process, extensive structural remains were uncovered, including walls, building foundations, tanks, wells, and related features. At one location, a square tank measuring about 40 feet on each side was identified. There were also reports that ancient jewellery and other valuable objects had been discovered in the vicinity of the Parambu.

In 1936, the site was declared as a protected monument by the Cochin Department of Archaeology. The site was excavated in 1945-1946 by the Cochin Archaeological Department.

The Archaeology Survey of India, Southern Circle, carried out excavations at Cheraman Parambu in 1968/1970 under the leadership of K. V. Soundara Rajan and K. V. Raman. The occupation was found to date from between the 13th and 16th centuries CE. Predominant among the finds were dull-red pottery of various forms, including jars, and a light cream-coloured stoneware bearing stamped designs such as oblique strokes and criss-cross patterns. A small number of porcelain fragments were also recovered. Other notable finds included rectangular roof tiles with wedge-shaped ends, glass beads, and several iron nails.

The excavations also yielded relics dating from the 8th to the 10th centuries CE. Ancient wells, extensive foundation walls, platforms, and sculptures were uncovered. Stratigraphic analysis also yielded artefacts such as pottery, beads, and tiles.
